= Peter Bogdanovich filmography =

Peter Bogdanovich (1939–2022) was an American film director, screenwriter, producer, actor and film historian whose career spanned over fifty years.

Bogdanovich's directorial work includes The Last Picture Show (1971), What's Up, Doc? (1972), Paper Moon (1973), Saint Jack (1979), They All Laughed (1981), Mask (1985), Texasville (1990), Noises Off (1992), The Thing Called Love (1993), The Cat's Meow (2001), and She's Funny That Way (2014). He also directed numerous films and specials for television, as well as the documentary Directed by John Ford (1971) and the Tom Petty musical documentary Runnin' Down a Dream (2007).

As an actor, he is best known for his portrayal of Dr. Elliot Kupferberg in the series The Sopranos. Additionally, Bogdanovich has amassed a number of unproduced screenplays and projects over the years that were never made. Most of these are now housed in his archive in the Lilly Library at Indiana University Bloomington. As a film historian, Bogdanovich has provided scholarly commentaries and interviews for various classic films, occasionally accompanied by archival material such as audio recordings of himself and the directors when they were still alive.

== Filmography ==
=== Filmmaking credits ===
Film

Year	Title	Director	Writer	Producer	Notes	Ref.
1968	Targets	Yes	Yes	Yes	Story co-written with Polly Platt; Also uncredited editor	
1971	The Last Picture Show	Yes	Yes	No	Co-written with Larry McMurtry	
1971	Directed by John Ford	Yes	Yes	No	Documentary film	
1972	What's Up, Doc?	Yes	Story	Yes		
1973	Paper Moon	Yes	No	Yes		
1974	Daisy Miller	Yes	No	Yes		
1975	At Long Last Love	Yes	Yes	Yes		
1976	Nickelodeon	Yes	Yes	No	Co-written with W. D. Richter	
1979	Saint Jack	Yes	Yes	No	Co-written with Howard Sackler and Paul Theroux	
1981	They All Laughed	Yes	Yes	No	Additional dialogue by Blaine Novak	
1985	Mask	Yes	No	No		
1988	Illegally Yours	Yes	No	Yes		
1990	Texasville	Yes	Yes	Yes		
1992	Noises Off	Yes	No	Executive		
1993	The Thing Called Love	Yes	No	No		
2001	The Cat's Meow	Yes	No	No		
2007	Runnin' Down a Dream	Yes	No	No	Documentary film	
2014	She's Funny That Way	Yes	Yes	No	Original title: Squirrels to the Nuts; Co-written with Louise Stratten	
2018	The Great Buster: A Celebration	Yes	Yes	Yes	Documentary film	

Television

Year	Title	Notes	Ref.
1995	Picture Windows	Episode: "Song of Songs" (S1 E2)	
1995	Fallen Angels	Episode: "A Dime a Dance" (S2 E3)	
1995	Prowler	Unaired pilot	
1996	To Sir, with Love II	Television films	
1997	The Price of Heaven	Television films	
1997	Rescuers: Stories of Courage: Two Women	Television films	
1998	Naked City: A Killer Christmas	Television films	
1999	A Saintly Switch	Television films	
2004	The Mystery of Natalie Wood	Television films	
2004	The Sopranos	Episode: "Sentimental Education" (S5 E6)	
2004	Hustle	Television film	

=== Acting credits ===
Film

Year	Title	Role	Notes	Ref.
1968	Targets	Sammy Michaels		
1968	Voyage to the Planet of Prehistoric Women	Narrator	Voice	
1971	The Last Picture Show	Disc Jockey	Voice cameo	
1977	Opening Night	Himself	Cameo	
1979	Saint Jack	Eddie Schuman		
1981	They All Laughed	Disk Jockey	Voice cameo	
1997	Highball	Frank		
1997	Mr. Jealousy	Howard Poke		
1998	54	Elaine's Patron	Cameo	
1998	Lick the Star	The Principal	Short films	
1999	Claire Makes It Big	Arturo Mulligan	Short films	
1999	Coming Soon	Bartholomew		
2001	Festival in Cannes	Milo		
2003	Kill Bill: Volume 1	Disc Jockey	Voice cameo	
2004	Kill Bill: Volume 2	Disc Jockey	Voice cameo	
2004	The Definition of Insanity	Himself	Cameo	
2006	Infamous	Bennett Cerf		
2007	Dedication	Roger Spade	Cameo	
2007	The Dukes	Lou		
2007	The Fifth Patient	Edward Birani		
2007	Broken English	Iriving Mann		
2007	The Doorman	Peter		
2008	Humboldt County	Professor Hadley		
2010	Abandoned	Markus Bensley		
2010	Queen of the Lot	Pedja Sapir		
2013	Don't Let Me Go	Man		
2013	Cold Turkey	Poppy		
2013	Are You Here	Judge Harlan Plath		
2014	The Tell-Tale Heart	The Old Man		
2014	One Day Since Yesterday: Peter Bogdanovich & the Lost American Film	Himself	Documentary film	
2014	While We're Young	Speaker	Cameo	
2015	Pearly Gates	Marty		
2016	Durant's Never Closes	George		
2016	Between Us	George		
2016	Six LA Love Stories	Duane Crawford		
2018	Los Angeles Overnight	Vedor Ph.D.		
2018	The Other Side of the Wind	Brooks Otterlake	Shot between 1970 and 1976	
2018	The Great Buster: A Celebration	Narrator	Documentary film	
2018	Reborn	Himself	Cameo	
2019	The Creatress	Theo Mencken		
2019	It Chapter Two	Peter – Director	Cameo	
2020	Nightwalkers	Unnamed	Short film	
2023	Willie and Me	Charley	Posthumous release	

Television

Year	Title	Role	Notes	Ref.
1987	Moonlighting	Himself	Episode: "The Straight Poop" (S3 E9)	
1993	Northern Exposure	Himself	Episode: "Rosebud" (S5 E7)	
1995	Cybill	Himself	Episode: "See Jeff Jump, Jump, Jeff, Jump!" (S1 E7)	
1995	Picture Windows	Lucca	Episode: "Song of Songs" (E2)	
1997	Bella Mafia	Vito Giancamo	Television films	
2000	Rated X	Film Professor	Television films	
2000	The Sopranos	Elliot Kupferberg	Episode: "Toodle-Fucking-Oo" (S2 E3)	
2000	The Sopranos	Elliot Kupferberg	Episode: "Big Girls Don't Cry" (S2 E5)	
2000	The Sopranos	Elliot Kupferberg	Episode: "From Where to Eternity" (S2 E9)	
2000	The Sopranos	Elliot Kupferberg	Episode: "House Arrest" (S2 E11)	
2001	The Sopranos	Elliot Kupferberg	Episode: "Employee of the Month" (S3 E4)	
2001	The Sopranos	Elliot Kupferberg	Episode: "He Is Risen" (S3 E8)	
2002	The Sopranos	Elliot Kupferberg	Episode: "The Weight" (S4 E4)	
2002	The Sopranos	Elliot Kupferberg	Episode: "Calling All Cars" (S4 E11)	
2003	Out of Order	Zach	Episode: "Pilot: Part One" (E1)	
2003	Out of Order	Zach	Episode: "Pilot: Part Two" (E2)	
2003	Out of Order	Zach	Episode: "The Art of Loss" (E3)	
2003	Out of Order	Zach	Episode: "Losing My Religion" (E4)	
2003	Out of Order	Zach	Episode: "Follow the Rat" (E5)	
2003	Out of Order	Zach	Episode: "Put Me In Order" (E6)	
2004	8 Simple Rules	Dr. Lohr	Episode: "Daddy's Girl" (S2 E16)	
2004	The Sopranos	Elliot Kupferberg	Episode: "Two Tonys" (S5 E1)	
2004	The Sopranos	Elliot Kupferberg	Episode: "All Happy Families..." (S5 E4)	
2005	Law & Order: Criminal Intent	George Merritt	Episode: "Sex Club" (S4 E14)	
2006	The Sopranos	Elliot Kupferberg	Episode: "Johnny Cakes" (S6 E8)	
2007	The Simpsons	Psychologist	Episode: "Yokel Chords" (S18 E14)	
2007	Dirty Sexy Money	Himself	Episode: "Pilot" (S1 E1)	
2007	The Sopranos	Elliot Kupferberg	Episode: "Stage 5" (S6 E14)	
2007	Law & Order: Criminal Intent	George Merritt	Episode: "Bombshell" (S6 E20)	
2007	The Sopranos	Elliot Kupferberg	Episode: "The Second Coming" (S6 E19)	
2007	The Sopranos	Elliot Kupferberg	Episode: "The Blue Comet" (S6 E20)	
2010	How I Met Your Mother	Himself	Episode: "Robots Versus Wrestlers" (S5 E22)	
2011	Rizzoli & Isles	Arnold Whistler	Episode: "Burning Down the House" (S2 E15)	
2014	The Good Wife	Himself	Episode: "Goliath and David" (S5 E11)	
2016	Documentary Now!	Himself	Episode: "Mr. Runner Up: My Life as an Oscar Bridesmaid, Part 1" (S2 E6)	
2017	Get Shorty	Giustino Moreweather	Episode: "Turnaround" (S1 E9)	
2018	Get Shorty	Giustino Moreweather	Episode: "Selenite" (S2 E3)	
2019	Get Shorty	Giustino Moreweather	Episode: "What To Do When You Land" (S3 E1)	
2019	Get Shorty	Giustino Moreweather	Episode: "Strong Move" (S3 E3)	

Music videos

Year	Title	Artist	Ref.
2012	"Constant Conversations"	Passion Pit	

=== Additional credits ===
Year	Title	Credit	Ref.
1966	The Wild Angels	Assistant to the director and uncredited rewrite of the script	
1968	Voyage to the Planet of Prehistoric Women	Directed additional scenes Under the pseudonym "Derek Thomas"	
1984	The City Girl	Executive producer	
2014	Phantom Halo	Executive producer	
2018	The Other Side of the Wind	Executive producer	

== Unrealized projects ==
Year	Title and description	Ref.
1960s	The Land of Opportunity, a film about a young New York couple who get everything for free	
1960s	A film adaptation of William Keepers Maxwell Jr.'s novel The Folded Leaf	
1960s	Marco and His Brothers, a film co-written with Polly Platt starring Sal Mineo	
1960s	The Criminals, retitled from The Day They Let the Prisoners Out, a World War II film co-written with Polly Platt	
1960s	Johnny and Johnny, retitled to Duck, You Sucker!	
1970s	A film adaptation of John H. Reese's novel The Looters co-written with Polly Platt	
1970s	A film adaptation of an unspecified Louis L'Amour Western novel, to be produced by Howard Hawks	
1970s	The Getaway starring Cybill Shepherd	
1970s	The Long Goodbye starring Robert Mitchum or Lee Marvin	
1970s	The Streets of Laredo, a Western written by Larry McMurtry, who later turned it into a novel, starring John Wayne, James Stewart, Henry Fonda, Ryan O'Neal, Cybill Shepherd, Ellen Burstyn, Cloris Leachman, Ben Johnson and The Clancy Brothers	
1970s	A film adaptation of John Galsworthy's short story "The Apple Tree" written by Gavin Lambert	
1970s	A film adaptation of Calder Willingham's novel Rambling Rose starring Cybill Shepherd, which he planned to make for The Directors Company	
1970s	The Texas Girl, a road movie inspired by Lolita starring Cybill Shepherd and Marcello Mastroianni	
1970s	Bugsy, a biopic written by Howard Sackler about the life of mobster Bugsy Siegel starring Sal Mineo and Cybill Shepherd	
1970s	Down, a "Hitchcockian" noir thriller written by Howard Sackler starring John Ritter and Cybill Shepherd	
1970s	A film adaptation of Dashiell Hammett's short story "The Girl with the Silver Eyes"	
1970s	King of the Gypsies	
1970s	Silver Streak	
1970s	The Authentic Life of Cheyenne Harry, a comedy written by Joseph McBride and Gerald Peary about the early days of Hollywood	
1970s	Heaven Can Wait	
1970s	Dancing, a film written by John Cassavetes starring Cassavetes alongside Peter Falk, Cybill Shepard and Raquel Welch	
1980s	The Return of the Count, a love story starring John Cassavetes and Dorothy Stratten	
1980s	A film adaptation of Norman Mailer's novel The Executioner's Song	
1980s	Twelve's a Crowd, a film starring Keith Carradine and Colleen Camp to be shot in Hollywood	
1980s	I'll Remember April, a drama about a woman with Alzheimer's disease starring Colleen Camp, John Cassavetes and Charles Aznavour to be shot in Paris	
1980s	A remake of the 1945 film noir Detour	
1980s	Brewster's Millions starring John Ritter as Montgomery Brewster	
1980s	The Lady in the Moon, a film in which Larry McMurtry was to share producer, writer and director credit	
1980s	Native Genius, a drama written by Peter and James Kaplan about a man who invents a car that runs on hydrogen fuel cells	
1980s	A film adaptation of Noël Coward's three-act play Private Lives starring Elizabeth Taylor and Richard Burton	
1980s	Whereabouts, a mystery adventure written by Jim Cash, Jack Epps Jr., Johnathan Reynolds and David Freeman starring Rusty Mason	
1980s	Wild About Harry, a comedy from a story co-written by Bogdanovich with Colleen Camp to be directed by Martha Coolidge	
1980s	Honkytonk Sue, a film based on the National Lampoon character written by Larry McMurtry starring Goldie Hawn	
1980s	A film adaptation of David Scott Milton's novel Paradise Road starring Frank Sinatra, James Stewart, Lee Marvin, Charles Aznavour, Dean Martin, Jerry Lewis, Sophia Loren and John Ritter	
1980s	Along the Way, a film adaptation of Michael Brady's two-act play To Gillian on Her 37th Birthday starring Molly Ringwald	
1980s	A film adaptation of Eduardo De Filippo's three-act play Saturday, Sunday, Monday starring Sophia Loren and Marcello Mastroianni	
1980s	The Intimate Writings of Theodor Hammer, a film set in Arizona written by Judith Fein	
1980s	A film adaptation of Robert Graves' novel The Golden Fleece	
1980s	Seven Days to the North Wind, a film adaptation of Robert Graves' novel Seven Days in New Crete	
1980s	A film adaptation of Robert Graves' novel Wife to Mr. Milton	
1990s	Another You	
1990s	Joined at the Hip, a film adaptation of Georges Feydeau's three-act play Un fil à la patte co-written with Adam Shaw starring Catherine Deneuve	
1990s	After the Shuffle, a film adaptation of Georges Feydeau's four-act play La main passe	
1990s	Mushrooms, a film adaptation of Georges Feydeau's three-act play Champignol malgré lui	
1990s	A segment of a six-hour documentary film titled Momentous Events: Russia in the '90s	
1990s	The Dreamers, an unmade Orson Welles film that Bogdanovich agreed to finish	
1990s	Curtain Call	
1990s	Face Facts, a comedy written by Lynn Adams starring Stanley Tucci, Phoebe Cates, Tony Shalhoub and Brooke Adams	
1990s	Wait for Me, a ghost comedy starring Michael Caine, Gena Rowlands, Isabella Rossellini, Peter Falk, Ben Gazzara, Cybill Shepherd, Jerry Lewis and Quentin Tarantino	
2000s	A film adaptation of Sam Kashner's novel Sinatraland written by Christopher Trumbo starring Robert Downey Jr.	
2000s	Blues of the Night, a film written by Evelyn Keyes about her teenage years in Hollywood	
2000s	Vanished, a film adaptation of Cornell Woolridge's short story written by Nick Cassavetes	
2000s	A Map of the City, an English family drama written by Paul Godfrey about what happens to a child after his poor, single mother dies, to be shot in England	
2000s	Star Crossed, a biopic about the love triangle between Jennifer Jones, Robert Walker and David O. Selznick	
2000s	A film adaptation of Tracy Letts' two-act play Killer Joe starring Jeff Bridges	
2000s	The Broken Code, a biopic about research scientist Rosalind Franklin written by David Baxter adapted from Anne Sayre's biography	
2000s	One Lucky Moon, a comedy drama co-written with Parish Rahbar starring Cybill Shepherd, Willie Nelson, Burt Reynolds, Eva Hassmann and Tom Petty	
2010s	A film adaptation of Kurt Andersen's novel Turn of the Century co-written with Parish Rahbar	
2010s	A film adaptation of Larry McMurtry's novel Duane's Depressed starring Jeff Bridges	
2010s	John Ledger, a drama written by Joey Camen starring Tom Sizemore as a car salesman who battles his addiction with sex	
2010s	A TV miniseries adaptation of Edward Ball's novel The Inventor and the Tycoon	
2010s	An untitled action thriller film	
2010s	A limited series based on his novel The Killing of the Unicorn	
2020s	Saint Jack in the Philippines, a limited series based on his film Saint Jack	
2020s	Our Love Is Here to Stay, a biopic co-written with Sam Kashner about George and Ira Gershwin	

Bogdanovich turned down the opportunity to direct Catch-22, A Glimpse of Tiger, The Godfather, a sequel to What's Up, Doc?, The Exorcist, The Way We Were, Chinatown, a sequel to Paper Moon titled Harvest Moon, Dog Day Afternoon then under the title The Boys in the Bank, Rooster Cogburn, Hurricane, Popeye, Gloria then under the title One Summer Night, Scarface, as well as the TV miniseries Lonesome Dove, which had been adapted from the novel from which The Streets of Laredo was based on. He also turned down the role played by Dabney Coleman in Tootsie, and parts in The Electric Horseman and The Big Red One.

== Stage productions ==
Year	Title	Author(s)	Venue	City	Notes	Ref.
1959	The Big Knife	Clifford Odets	Off-Broadway	New York City		
1960	The Big Knife	Clifford Odets	Off-Broadway	New York City		
1961	Camino Reel	Tennessee Williams	Phoenicia Playhouse Community Theatre	Phoenicia		
1961	Ten Little Indians	Agatha Christie	Phoenicia Playhouse Community Theatre	Phoenicia		
1961	Rocket to the Moon	Clifford Odets	Phoenicia Playhouse Community Theatre	Phoenicia		
1964	Once in a Lifetime	Moss Hart and George S. Kaufman	Off-Broadway	New York City		
2004	Sacred Monsters	Himself	Sheridan Opera House	Telluride	One-man stage show	
2005	Sacred Monsters	Himself	Sheridan Opera House	Telluride	One-man stage show	
2006	Sacred Monsters	Himself	Linwood Dunn Theatre	Los Angeles	One-man stage show	

== Audio commentaries, intros, etc. ==
Title	Credit	Found on	Ref.
Targets	Commentary & video introduction	Paramount Widescreen Collection	
The Last Picture Show	1991 commentary with actors Cybill Shepherd, Randy Quaid, Cloris Leachman and Frank Marshall	Criterion laserdisc	
The Last Picture Show	2009 solo commentary	Sony Pictures	
What's Up, Doc?	Commentary	Warner Home Video	
Paper Moon	Commentary	Warner Home Video	
Daisy Miller	Commentary & video introduction	Paramount Widescreen Collection	
Nickelodeon	Commentary	Sony Pictures	
Saint Jack	Commentary		
They All Laughed	Commentary & 2006 interview with filmmaker Wes Anderson	HBO Video	
Mask	Commentary & 2004 conversation	Universal	
The Thing Called Love	Commentary	Paramount Widescreen Collection	
The Cat's Meow	Commentary	Lionsgate Home Entertainment	
"Sentimental Education"	Commentary	HBO Video	
She's Funny That Way	Commentary with co-writer/producer Louise Stratten	Lionsgate Home Entertainment	
A Safe Place	1971 archival video interview	Criterion	
Bringing Up Baby	Commentary	Warner Home Video	
Citizen Kane	Commentary	Warner Home Video	
Clash by Night	Commentary with audio interview excerpts of director Fritz Lang	Warner Home Video	
El Dorado	Commentary	Paramount Centennial Collection	
F for Fake	Video introduction	Criterion	
Five Easy Pieces	2009 interviews from the documentary BBStory	Criterion	
Frances Ha	2013 conversation with filmmaker Noah Baumbach	Criterion	
French Cancan	Video introduction	Criterion	
Fury	Commentary with audio interview excerpts of director Fritz Lang	Warner Home Video	
La Bête Humaine	2004 interview	Criterion	
The Lady Eve	2001 video introduction & 2020 conversation with director Preston Sturges's biographer and son Tom Sturges and other participants	Criterion	
The Lady from Shanghai	Commentary	Columbia Classics	
Land of the Pharaohs	Commentary with audio interview excerpts of director Howard Hawks	Warner Home Video	
The Lodger: A Story of the London Fog	Audio interview excerpts with director Alfred Hitchcock from 1963 and 1972	Criterion	
M	Commentary with audio interview excerpts of director Fritz Lang & 1965 archival audio interview with Lang	Eureka Video	
The Magnificent Ambersons	1978 archival interview with director Orson Welles	Criterion	
Make Way for Tomorrow	2009 interview	Criterion	
The Man Who Shot Liberty Valance	Commentary with audio interview excerpts of director John Ford and co-star James Stewart	Paramount Centennial Collection	
Notorious	2009 interviews from the documentary Once Upon a Time... Notorious	Criterion	
Only Angels Have Wings	1972 archival audio excerpts with director Howard Hawks	Criterion	
Othello	1995 audio commentary with Orson Welles scholar Myron Meisel	Criterion laserdisc	
Red River	2014 interview & 1972 archival audio excerpts with director Howard Hawks	Criterion	
The Rules of the Game	Reading commentary written by film scholar Alexander Sesonske	Criterion	
The Searchers	Commentary	Warner Home Video	
"The Sopranos"	Commentary with Sopranos creator David Chase	HBO Video	
Stagecoach	Video appreciation	Criterion	
Strangers on a Train	Commentary with Psycho screenwriter Joseph Stefano and other participants	Warner Home Video	
The Third Man	Video introduction	Criterion	
To Catch a Thief	Commentary with film historian Laurent Bouzereau	Paramount Collectors Edition	
Trouble in Paradise	Video introduction	Criterion	
