= Centennial Secondary School (Coquitlam) =

Location
- 570 Poirier Street; Coquitlam, British Columbia, V3J 6A8; Canada; 49°15′11″N 122°50′52″W

Information
- School type: Public, high school
- Established: 1966 (original building); 2017 (new building)
- School district: School District 43 Coquitlam
- School number: 4343076
- Principal: Ms. Manjit Rai
- Staff: 135
- Grades: 9-12
- Enrollment: 1550 (2024–25)
- Campus: Open Campus
- Colours: Red; Blue; White
- Mascot: Centaur
- Website: www.sd43.bc.ca/secondary/centennial
- Last updated: 19 July 2018

Centennial Secondary School is a high school located in Coquitlam, British Columbia. Established in 1967, the centennial year of Canadian Confederation, it is part of School District 43 Coquitlam. Centennial has over 1500 students and is structured on a semester system. In addition to academic programs, it offers special programs such as Football, Computer Game Design, Culinary Arts, Automotive Technology, and a Hockey Academy.

== History ==
Centennial Secondary School was built in 1966, and established in 1967. This was a year before the centennial of Canada's founding. It was completed one year after adjacent Vanier Elementary opened in 1965. Its running track was completed soon after on an empty grassy field. An additional activity centre and gymnasium were built on the southeast side of the school in 2003.

In September 2016, some students and faculty started moving into a newer building bearing the Centennial name, built southwest of the original building. Construction ended on the newer building in 2017 and in late 2017 after all staff and students had finished moving into the newer building, the older building began demolition, which was completed in May 2018. The remnants was replaced by a sports field, and an extension on the existing activity centre which became a neighbourhood learning centre.

== Programs and Athletics ==
=== Music Department ===
Centennial's music department offers concert and jazz bands and choirs. The theatre department offers varying programs including Metfest, Centfest, and Musical Theatre classes. The music department works together with the theatre department to put on a major production every year. The 2009 production of "Grease" was well received by the local community and all shows were sold out prior to the production dates; this created a larger following for the theatre department's future productions, most of those fully selling out as well. The music department has also been known to put on different fundraising events to help students pay for things like uniforms and supplies as well as field trips. The fundraising events include a haunted house around Halloween, tree chipping after Christmas, and various food fundraisers.

=== Summer Learning ===
Centennial is one of two secondary schools in the district to offer summer learning credit courses, the other being Gleneagle Secondary. Most core courses are available, especially those required for graduation. Students may take up to two courses with a refundable deposit of $100 each. Courses can be face-to-face or a combination of online and traditional learning (FastTrack).

=== Athletics ===
The school's sports teams include badminton, basketball, cross country running, curling, field hockey, field lacrosse, football, golf, gymnastics, netball, rugby, soccer, swimming, tennis, track & field, volleyball, water polo, and wrestling.

Since the 2009–2010 school year, Centennial (along with Riverside Secondary in Port Coquitlam) has been offering a hockey academy program to boys and girls. The program gives students three hours of course time on ice a week and two hours of off-ice instruction for four credits towards graduation. While hockey programs are common throughout other school districts in North America, this academy represents the first of its kind in the Tri-Cities.

== Building Replacement ==
Centennial Secondary's original school building, constructed in 1967, is currently being replaced with a newer building located on the same site. Once construction is complete, the old building will be demolished, with the exception of one of its gymnasiums. The new building was designed by Graham Hoffart Mathiasen Architects and will have a capacity of 1250 students. The school's design is expected to meet LEED Gold standards, by utilizing features such as environmental conservation, energy efficiency, an emphasis on the use of natural lighting, and natural landscaping. The school will have a teaching kitchen, shops for metal, automotive and carpentry, and a 220-seat theatre. Design features include classrooms with moveable walls, flexible learning spaces for student-teacher collaboration, and an outdoor amphitheatre. The cost of the new school is $49-million and includes the construction of a new Neighbourhood Learning Centre that will house youth programs and post-secondary programs.

The project was initially announced by the province in 2009. Detailed plans for the school replacement were presented to the public on January 17, 2012. Construction of the new school began in late 2013, and is expected to be finished during the 2015–2016 school year. Those expectations were met in 2016.

Several residents from the surrounding residential neighbourhood raised concerns about the proposed building's height, stating that portions of the building at a height of 16 metres would decrease property values, diminished sightlines, and restrict privacy and natural lighting. The project's architect responded by stating that testing concluding that no natural lighting to surrounding buildings would be lost.

== Notable alumni ==
James Moore, former Conservative cabinet minister and Member of Parliament for Port Moody—Westwood—Port Coquitlam, graduated from Centennial in 1994.

Former FA Premier League goalkeeper Craig Forrest attended Centennial School. Forrest appeared in 263 games for Ipswich Town, 30 games for West Ham United, and 3 games for Chelsea. Forrest also earned 56 caps for the Canadian national soccer team, the most of any goalkeeper in team history, and earned the most clean sheets in the country's history. Forrest was elected to Canada's Soccer Hall of Fame in 2007. Current Canadian national soccer team midfielder Jeff Clarke and Canadian women's national soccer player Brittany Timko also both attended Centennial School.

Juno Award-winning rock musician Matthew Good graduated from Centennial School in 1989, and became lead singer for the Matthew Good Band, one of Canada's most successful alternative rock bands in the 1990s. Centennial School was featured in the "Alert Status Red" video, and its cheerleading squad recorded for "Giant". The Matthew Good Band was dissolved in 2002, and Good has since pursued a solo career and established himself as a political activist, blogger, and author of a book of previously published manifestos.

Alex Stieda graduated in 1979, was an MVP on the Varsity Volleyball team and was the first Canadian and North American to earn and wear the Yellow Jersey in the 1986 Tour de France.

Brent Pierce, who graduated from Centennial Secondary in 1987, was on the Greg McAulay team that won the 2000 Briar (Canadian Curling Championships). He then participated at the 2000 Ford World Curling Championships. In 2009, Pierce was at the Briar again as the third on the Sean Geall team

Former National Basketball Association player Lars Hansen played his high school basketball at Centennial School. He was a member of the Seattle SuperSonics 1979 NBA Championship team, and was elected to the Canadian Basketball Hall of Fame in 2008.

Playboy Playmate and actress Dorothy Stratten attended Centennial High School. Stratten was Playmate of the Year for 1980. She appeared in several movies, including Peter Bogdanovich's "They All Laughed", before she was murdered by her estranged husband. Stratten was portrayed twice in biographies of her life, by Jamie Lee Curtis in Death of a Centerfold: The Dorothy Stratten Story, and by Mariel Hemingway in "Star 80".

B.C. Lions wide receiver Lemar Durant graduated from Centennial in 2010. He led the 2009 Centennial Centaurs football team to win the provincial championship in his senior season. Durant was drafted by the Calgary Stampeders in 2015 and won a Grey Cup with the club in 2018 while also being named the game's Most Outstanding Canadian.

Ryan Wedding graduated in 1999. A former Canadian Olympic snowboarder and alleged drug trafficker. He represented Canada at the 2002 Winter Olympics in the men's parallel giant slalom event. After the Olympics, it is alleged he became a transnational drug trafficker, and he is alleged to have later orchestrated the murders of various witnesses. On March 6, 2025, he was added to the FBI Ten Most Wanted Fugitives list. As of January 22, 2026 he is under the custody of the relevant US authorities while his case is under judicial proceedings.

== Movies/TV ==
Centennial High School was used in the filming of an episode of Psych, Season 3 Episode 2, titled "Murder? … Anyone? … Anyone? … Bueller?"

"Stand Against Fear" featuring Sarah Chalke was filmed at Centennial in 1996.

Scenes from Aliens vs. Predator: Requiem and American Pie Presents: The Book of Love were also filmed at Centennial.
