= The Killing of the Unicorn =

1984 book by Peter Bogdanovich

The Killing of the Unicorn: Dorothy Stratten 1960–1980
- Author: Peter Bogdanovich
- Language: English
- Publisher: William Morrow
- Publication date: 1984
- Publication place: United States

The Killing of the Unicorn: Dorothy Stratten 1960–1980 is a book by Peter Bogdanovich detailing the relationship between Bogdanovich and Dorothy Stratten, the making of They All Laughed and Stratten's murder. There is also criticism of Hugh Hefner and Playboy and its treatment of women.

Bogdanovich says he wrote the book "for himself. I wanted to understand what happened to her. I felt I couldn't move forward with my life, creative or otherwise until I did. I also wanted other young women, including my teenage daughters, to know about this web, this trap Dorothy had fallen into." Bogdanovich says the book was meant to be delivered to William Morrow in August 1982 "but new facts kept coming to light and so it was delayed. I did more and more rewriting. In all, I suppose, I wrote the book five times."

While he was writing the book two films about the Stratten murder came out, Star 80 and Death of a Centerfold: The Dorothy Stratten Story.

== Reception ==
A review in People magazine called the book:

[A] sometimes provocative but relentlessly self-serving version of Stratten's life and death ... blames Hefner's hedonistic philosophy for Dorothy's death and just about all of society's ills except the size of the federal deficit ... Hefner is portrayed as an insensitive, petty sexmonger and egomaniac. Bogdanovich insists that a postmidnight interlude in a hot tub between Hef and a reluctant Dorothy irreparably damaged her psyche. Bogdanovich portrays himself as Mr. Sensitive and a goody-goody.

The New York Times wrote "Bogdanovich says perhaps more than he should ... [the book is] part-tribute, part self justification, part accusation." The Chicago Tribune called it "a shabby little shocker".

Filmink magazine called it "fascinating, powerful reading… even if at times you go “too much information! Don’t tell me about you banging her in the hot tub!”"

=== Fallout ===
Private eye Marc Goldstein later sued Bogdanovich for $10 million for being libeled in the book.

The book led to a court case in Britain when the Sun printed extracts from the book despite exclusive publication rights being granted to another newspaper.

In 1985, Hugh Hefner suffered a stroke and blamed it in part on stress caused by Bogdanovich's allegations against him in the book.

The same year, Bogdanovich declared bankruptcy, claiming he owed $6.6 million in debts against assets of $1.5 million. He blamed this mostly on costs of distributing They All Laughed. His interest in the book was assigned to his principal creditor, the First Los Angeles Bank.

Bogdanovich later married Stratten's sister Louise.

Bogdanovich later said he "got paid, you know, not a lot of money" for the book "and it was much reviled upon its appearance. We got one good review from Charles Champlin ... we were in the bestseller list for a couple of weeks; a few weeks, but there was a tremendous sort of groundswell of animosity towards me that was fueled by various sections of the community. And the book was very anti-Playboy and just a lot of enemies came up and decided to kill me."

== Attempted television series ==
In a 2018 interview, Bogdanovich stated that Paramount had asked to option The Killing of the Unicorn, with plans to make a 10-hour series out of it. Bogdanovich worked on the project toward the end of his life as a limited-run "detective series", with Stratten's younger sister Louise. According to Louise, after Bogdanovich's death, his longtime collaborator Frank Marshall was supposedly taking over the project.
