= Illegally Yours =

1988 film by Peter Bogdanovich

- Theatrical poster
- Directed by: Peter Bogdanovich
- Written by: Max Dickens; M.A. Stewart
- Produced by: Peter Bogdanovich; Steve Foley (associate producer)
- Starring: Rob Lowe; Colleen Camp; Kenneth Mars; Kim Myers
- Cinematography: Dante Spinotti
- Edited by: Richard Fields; Ronald Krehel
- Music by: Phil Marshall
- Distributed by: United Artists (USA & Canada); De Laurentiis Entertainment Group (International)
- Release date: May 13, 1988
- Running time: 102 minutes
- Country: United States
- Language: English
- Budget: $13 million
- Box office: $259,019

Illegally Yours is a 1988 American comedy film set in St. Augustine, Florida where a series of comic mishaps take place involving a blackmailer, a corpse, an incriminating audiotape, an innocent woman who accidentally picks up the tape, and a pair of teenage blackmail victims. The film was directed by Peter Bogdanovich with Rob Lowe starring as Richard Dice, the college dropout who came back home to get his act together. The film's theme song was performed by Johnny Cash.

The film was a critical and commercial failure. Bogdanovich himself considered it one of his worst films as a director, besides being "my penance for being so difficult with everybody while shooting Mask three years prior."

== Cast ==
- Rob Lowe as Richard Dice
- Colleen Camp as Molly Gilbert
- Kenneth Mars as Hal B. Keeler
- Louise Straten as Sharon Woolrich
- Harry Carey, Jr. as Wally Finnegan
- Kim Myers as Suzanne Keeler
- Marshall Colt as Donald Cleary
- Rick Jason as Freddie Boneflecker
- Jessica James as Mrs. Evelyn Dice
- Linda MacEwen as Ruth Harrison
- George Morfogen as Judge Norman Meckel
- Marjorie O. Taylor as Honey Bunny
- Ira Heiden as Andrew Dice

== Production ==
Bogdanovich was going to direct Sophia Loren and Marcello Mastrioanni in Saturday, Sunday, Monday but the film was delayed so he did this instead. "I only did it because I needed some money", said Bogdanovich, who had declared bankruptcy in 1985.

The film was a change of pace for Rob Lowe, who was much in demand at the time due to the success of About Last Night. Lowe admired Bogdanovich's films and hoped the movie would do for him what What's Up Doc? did for Ryan O'Neal.

Bogdanovich says he encouraged Lowe to wear glasses like the actor did in real life. Bogdanovich showed Lowe The Awful Truth and Bringing Up Baby to show what he wanted.

Lowe felt the movie needed a name co-star but Bogdanovich insisted he use his old friend and collaborator Colleen Camp. Lowe says Bogdanovich insisted on rewriting the script, which made the actor uneasy since he liked the original script. Part of the rewrites involved adding a character to be played by L. B. Straten.

L.B. Straten was Louise Stratten, sister of Dorothy Stratten who had dated Bogdanovich. Louise Stratten and Bogdanovich would later be married.

Lowe said he went along with the changes because he "loved Peter" although he ultimately felt "every artist can chase his own vision into a blind alley. And on Illegally Yours he did just that."

=== Shooting ===
Filming started in January 1987 and went until April. "There were constant weather problems", Bogdanovich says. "We were shooting in northern Florida under two different weather fronts. There was also pressure to complete the movie in time for summer release--something that became more and more difficult to do."

Pat MacEnulty, who worked on the film, recalled "the crew practically mutinied."

== Reception ==
The film was originally meant to come out on July 31, 1987. However, during a test screening, reportedly half the audience walked out and the release date was pushed back to May 1988.

Associate producer Peggy Robertson said, "We went in knowing the film wasn't ready. Peter knew what was missing and had accommodated for it, but the audience didn't.... Peter tried [to make the July release date] but it boiled down to, 'Do you want it quick or do you want it good?' We just finished filming in April, so I don't think anyone was surprised when it didn't work out." A DEG spokesman said, "It told us a movie was there and the audience we were aiming for (women between 18 and 25) was responding. That's the reason we're taking our time now. It's not just another programmer."

The De Laurentis Group ran into financial troubles and the release date kept being delayed. This affected other films from the producer, as well. "All the films are in limbo until [the group's problems] are resolved", said Bogdanovich. "It takes a lot of time because there's a lot of banks and different people involved, but I'm assured by DEG that it will come out either by them or another distributor... It's been a tough ride for Dino. He's just had a hard run of luck."

"We showed this picture to kids, and they were screaming", he said. "Critics have to say, 'Bogdanovich is doing this in the tradition of screwball comedy' because that's what it is and they're stuck with saying it. But kids just see that [Rob Lowe] is falling down, and there's an excitement about that because they haven't seen it before."

Bogdanovich said he had "high hopes for" the film "but it was re-cut completely by Dino De Laurentiis."

The film was a financial and critical failure. Bogdanovich later called it "awful... I don't even like to mention it."

On Rotten Tomatoes the film received negative reviews from critics.

Variety called it, "an embarrassingly unfunny attempt at screwball comedy, marking a career nadir for producer-director Peter Bogdanovich and his miscast star Rob Lowe."

Filmink called it, "a mess. Makes no sense. Rob Lowe tries. So does Colleen Camp. It’s confusing. Dumb. Has the hallmarks of many Bogdanovich flops, i.e. endless long takes of people yabbering without it being funny."

== Bibliography ==
- Lowe, Rob (2011). Stories I Only Told My Agent.
