= Pieces of Time =

Pieces of Time: Peter Bogdanovich On The Movies
- Author: Peter Bogdanovich
- Language: English
- Publication date: 1973
- Publication place: United States

Pieces of Time: Peter Bogdanovich On The Movies is a 1973 book by Peter Bogdanovich consisting of a collection of writings by Bogdanovich on film, including pieces he had previously written for Esquire.

The title is taken from a phrase American actor James Stewart spoke in an interview with Peter Bogdanovich in 1966, which appears in the book. It is in the chapter Th' Respawnsibility of Bein' J ... Jimmy Stewart, in which Stewart says, "An' that's the thing – that's the great thing about the movies. ...After you learn – and if you're good and Gawd helps ya and you're lucky enough to have a personality that comes across – then what you're doing is ... you're giving people little ... little, tiny pieces of time ... that they never forget."
