= They All Laughed =

1981 film by Peter Bogdanovich

- Theatrical release poster
- Directed by: Peter Bogdanovich
- Written by: Peter Bogdanovich; Blaine Novak
- Produced by: George Morfogen; Blaine Novak
- Starring: Ben Gazzara; Audrey Hepburn; John Ritter; Colleen Camp; Patti Hansen; Dorothy Stratten; George Morfogen; Blaine Novak; Sean Ferrer; Linda MacEwen
- Cinematography: Robby Müller
- Edited by: William C. Carruth; Scott Vickrey
- Production companies: Moon Pictures; Time-Life Films
- Distributed by: Moon Pictures; PSO
- Release dates: September 2, 1981 (Venice Film Festival); November 20, 1981 (New York City)
- Running time: 115 minutes
- Country: United States
- Language: English
- Budget: $8.6 million

They All Laughed is a 1981 American romantic comedy film directed by Peter Bogdanovich and starring Ben Gazzara, Audrey Hepburn, John Ritter, Colleen Camp, Patti Hansen, and Dorothy Stratten. The film was based on a screenplay by Bogdanovich and Blaine Novak. It takes its name from the George and Ira Gershwin song of the same name.

The film is set in New York City, largely filmed outdoors on the streets, and tells the story of three private detectives investigating two beautiful women for infidelity. The detectives eventually wind up romantically pursuing the women, who turn the tables on them. The film is also a candid look at love and sex in New York City in the early 1980s.

In the aftermath of Stratten's murder in 1980, Bogdanovich bought the film's theatrical rights for a late 1981 theatrical release, which eventually led to his bankruptcy in 1985. It was Bogdanovich's last film project for several decades that he pitched himself until his last film She's Funny That Way in 2014, having become a director-for-hire in his succeeding projects.

== Plot ==
The New York–based private investigation firm Odyssey Detective Agency employs three agents: the middle-aged, womanizing John Russo, the younger, hippie-ish Arthur Brodsky, and the nervy and anxious Charles Rutledge. Their cantankerous boss, Leon Leondopolous, tries to keep his bumbling agents in line while carrying on a poorly-disguised affair with his secretary Amy. Odyssey is investigating two separate married women: Angela Niotes, the aged but glamorous wife of a British tycoon, and Dolores Martin, a beautiful blonde. While attempting to follow Angela from the Manhattan heliport, John meets a taxi driver named Deborah Wilson. The two are instantly infatuated, and John makes plans to see Deborah (whom he calls "Sam") later that night. At the same time, Charles falls for Dolores as he spies on her in the lobby of a hotel. Arthur (who juggles a series of passionate romances throughout the film) is worried for each of his co-workers, but assists each of them in growing closer to their objects of affection: he helps John get away from his on-again off-again partner, country singer Christy Miller, and devises a plan for Charles to have a conversation with Dolores at a roller rink. He learns that Dolores is indeed cheating on her husband with Jose, a playboy with whom she plans to elope.

The next morning, John recounts his tryst with Deborah to Leon; he worries that he has become too old for younger women. Meanwhile, Christy, who has figured out what John has done, decides to get back at him by starting a relationship with Charles. The two head to Midtown, where they run into Dolores at an upscale clothing store. Christy later tries to initiate a sexual encounter with Charles, but he is already too infatuated with Dolores to reciprocate. Meanwhile, John and Arthur track Angela and her young son to a toy store. John confesses who he is, but Angela is not surprised, as she knows that her husband is himself cheating on her. An attraction grows between John and Angela; once again Arthur helps his friend by pretending to be John's son. Deborah runs into Angela and John at the latter's apartment; she does not appear to be bothered by John's simultaneous desire for the two women. Meanwhile, Dolores almost kisses Charles at one of Christy's concerts, while Christy herself confesses her attraction to Jose. When Charles follows Dolores back home, she eventually leaves her apartment and kisses him before running away.

Charles spends the night on a bench outside of Dolores' apartment, following her to a courthouse where Christy observes her and Jose enter a judge's chambers. Christy invites most of the other characters to another concert as Deborah and Angela have a secretive conversation. Later, Angela tells John that she is returning to Europe with her husband and son; she has arranged Deborah to take her place and nurse his broken heart. At the concert, Charles is reunited with Dolores, who reveals that she went to the courthouse to obtain a divorce. He proposes marriage to her (which she accepts). Christy introduces Jose, her fiancé, to the concert's audience. The following day, Charles and Dolores as well as Christy and Jose are married in a double wedding. John tearfully sees Angela off, then returns to his cab, where Deborah is waiting.

== Cast ==
- Audrey Hepburn as Angela Niotes
- Ben Gazzara as John Russo
- Patti Hansen as Sam, Deborah Wilson
- John Ritter as Charles Rutledge
- Dorothy Stratten as Dolores Martin
- Blaine Novak as Arthur Brodsky
- Linda MacEwen as Amy Lester
- George Morfogen as Leon Leondopolous
- Colleen Camp as Christy Miller
- Sean Hepburn Ferrer (Audrey's son) as Jose
- Elizabeth Pena as Rita

== Production ==
"The genesis of They All Laughed was that Benny [Gazzara] and I talked a lot about romances and affairs and the battle of the sexes", said Bogdanovich later. "[I wanted] to try to make a personal picture, but not a personal picture like an indie prod. I wanted to hide it, like the old filmmakers in the studio system did. Hide it behind a genre. The genre was private detectives".

The film was financed by a filmmaking division of Time Inc.

"I didn't do any research about detectives", said Bogdanovich. "I never even went into a detective's office, but that didn't matter to me. That's not what it was about, that was just the disguise I hung my hat on."

"Audrey Hepburn's story in the movie is Audrey Hepburn's story in life", said the director. "She was living with a man, her second husband, he was cheating on her, and she basically stayed with him because of the child."

The film was shot on location in New York City during the spring and summer of 1980. Bogdanovich would often write scenes and give them to the actors just before they were shot, to give the film a feeling of freshness.

Country music is prominently featured. According to Bogdanovich, in the first version of the script, the character of Christy was going to be a jazz singer, singing jazz standards, but then:

There was a short, very short, very brief, vogue of country music in New York. About 30 seconds. And so I changed it. I like country music. I fell in love with it on Last Picture Show. In fact, I wrote a couple of country songs. The phrase "One Day Since Yesterday" was something Dorothy said to me in a card. I liked the phrase.

=== Murder of Dorothy Stratten ===
Dorothy Stratten had begun an affair with Bogdanovich during filming. Paul Snider, her estranged husband and manager, hired a private detective to follow her. Stratten then moved in with Bogdanovich, planning to file for divorce. When Snider was certain he had lost his wife and protégé, he murdered her and then committed suicide. These events were depicted in Bob Fosse's 1983 film Star 80 (where Bogdanovich's counterpart was named Aram Nicholas, played by Roger Rees) and the television film Death of a Centerfold: The Dorothy Stratten Story (1981).

Bogdanovich says Frank Sinatra let him have the rights to several of his songs for a cheap price because Sinatra felt sorry for Bogdanovich after Stratten's murder.

== Release ==
Before the film was released, Time shut down its filmmaking division. 20th Century Fox, which retained North American distribution rights, test-marketed the film in Providence, Rhode Island and Minneapolis, but was disappointed with the results and pulled the film's release. Bogdanovich decided to distribute the film himself. His manager later claimed the director spent $5 million, but it made less than $1 million in ticket sales. This contributed to the director declaring bankruptcy in 1985. Bogdanovich:

It was a nightmare. Dorothy was murdered and I went crazy. I decided I would buy the film back from Fox and I lost my shirt distributing it myself which was insanity. Unfortunately, nobody stopped me. So it didn’t get great distribution because you can’t self-distribute. It's impossible. For example, we played 15 weeks at the Music Hall in Beverly Hills. It was a huge success. We got a great theatre in Westwood and it broke all the records, and they pulled it right out because Paramount wanted the theatre for Reds.

Bogdanovich later wrote about the making of the film in the 1984 book The Killing of the Unicorn.

The film premiered at the Venice Film Festival on September 2, 1981, and was later released in theaters in the United States on November 20 of that same year.

The film was released to VHS on January 31, 1995; HBO Home Video released the film to DVD (as a 25th Anniversary Edition) on October 17, 2006. It started streaming on HBO Max in March 2024.

== Reception ==
On the review aggregator website Rotten Tomatoes, 50% of 10 critics' reviews are positive.

== Legacy ==
They All Laughed was the last theatrical film in which Hepburn played a lead role (she later starred in the television film Love Among Thieves and had a cameo role in Steven Spielberg's Always). According to an interview conducted by Wes Anderson in the DVD features for the film, director Bogdanovich claims Hepburn and Gazzara fell in love and had an affair while shooting Bloodline (1979). Though the affair was short-lived, it inspired the characters they each played in They All Laughed.

Along with Heaven's Gate, Cruising, and One from the Heart, They All Laughed generally is regarded as the end of the New Hollywood period, and the director-driven studio films of the 1970s. Since the very public failures of these four films, Hollywood studios rarely allow directors to control the films they finance.

In 2002 the likes of Quentin Tarantino and Wes Anderson praised the film.

"It was a very loving picture", said Bogdanovich in 2011. "It was the happiest time of my life. I look back on it now and it's been like thirty years or so – it was definitely the high point in my life."
