= George Morfogen =

American actor (1933–2019)

- Born: March 30, 1933; The Bronx, New York, U.S.
- Died: March 8, 2019 (aged 85); Manhattan, New York City, U.S.
- Occupation: Actor
- Years active: 1957–2016
- Spouse: Gene Laughorne (m. 1968)

George Morfogen (March 30, 1933 – March 8, 2019) was an American stage, film and TV actor. He is known for playing Bob Rebadow in the HBO show Oz, and for his role as Stanley Bernstein in the original V miniseries.

He was of Greek descent.

== Biography ==
He appeared at the Chelsea Theater Center of Brooklyn and at the off-Broadway Westside Theatre in Heinrich von Kleist's play, The Prince of Homburg. The play was videotaped for the PBS series, Great Performances, and later released as a DVD. A chapter in Davi Napoleon's book, Chelsea on the Edge: The Adventures of an American Theater describes the rehearsal process and the production.

Morfogen was lifelong friends with director Peter Bogdanovich, and was best man for Bogdanovich at his 1962 wedding to Polly Platt. Morfogen acted in five films directed by Bogdanovich: What's Up, Doc? (1972), Daisy Miller (1974), They All Laughed (1981; also producer), Illegally Yours (1988; also co-producer), and She's Funny That Way (2014). He worked off-screen on several other Bogdanovich movies; Morfogen was dialogue coach on At Long Last Love (1975), and associate producer on Saint Jack (1979) and Mask (1985).

In 2001 he reprised his role as Bob in the Off-Broadway premiere of Uncle Bob, by Austin Pendleton, who wrote the role with Morfogen in mind. Gale Harold, followed by Joseph Gordon-Levitt, played the character of Josh, Bob's nephew. The production, which was directed by Courtney Moorehead and produced by Steven Sendor, had 114 performances at The SoHo Playhouse. He was a teacher at HB Studio.

In 2011 Morfogen was named best actor of a drama or comedy at the ninth annual New Hampshire Theatre Awards ceremony. He won for his portrayal of Sigmund Freud in the Petersborough Players' production of Freud's Last Session.

== Personal life and death ==
He died on March 8, 2019, 22 days before his 86th birthday. He was survived by his husband Gene Laughorne. They were partners for 51 years.

== Filmography ==
=== Film ===
George Morfogen film credits
| Year | Title | Role |
|---|---|---|
| 1972 | What's Up, Doc? | Headwaiter |
| 1973 | The Thief Who Came to Dinner | Rivera |
| 1974 | Daisy Miller | Eugenio |
| 1980 | Those Lips, Those Eyes | Sherman Sprat |
| 1980 | Times Square | Don Dowd |
| 1981 | They All Laughed | Leon Leondopolous |
| 1984 | Heartbreakers | Max |
| 1988 | Illegally Yours | Judge Norman Meckel |
| 1993 | Twenty Bucks | Jack Holiday |
| 1996 | The Substance of Fire | Otto the printer |
| 1998 | Charlie Hoboken | Father |
| 2006 | Waltzing Anna | Henry |
| 2008 | The Marconi Bros. | Grandpa Marconi |
| 2014 | She's Funny That Way | Harold Fleet |

=== Television ===
George Morfogen television credits
| Year | Title | Role | Notes |
|---|---|---|---|
| 1976 | Kojak | Charley | 1 episode |
| 1983 | Special Bulletin | Dr. Morse Mansfield | TV movie |
| 1983 | Sadat | Salem | TV miniseries |
| 1983 | Blood Feud | George De Santis | Television film |
| 1983 | V | Stanley Bernstein | 2 episodes |
| 1984 | V: The Final Battle | Stanley Bernstein | 1 episodes |
| 1985 | The Equalizer | Vezay Holden | Episode: "The Distant Fire" |
| 1987 | The Equalizer | Everett Austin | Episode: "The Rehearsal" |
| 1989 | Kojak: Fatal Flaw | Moose | TV movie |
| 1990 | One Life to Live | Judge Anthony Powers | 10 episodes |
| 1991 | Law & Order | Dwight Anderson | Episode: "The Serpent's Tooth" |
| 2000 | Law & Order | Mr. Reyes | Episode: "Vaya Con Dios" |
| 1997–2003 | Oz | Bob Rebadow | 56 episodes |
| 2016 | Law & Order: Special Victims Unit | Mr. Markowitz | Episode: "Collateral Damages" |
