= Directed by John Ford =

1971 film by Peter Bogdanovich

- Directed by: Peter Bogdanovich
- Written by: Peter Bogdanovich
- Produced by: David H. Shepard; James R. Silke; George Stevens, Jr. Frank Marshall
- Starring: Peter Bogdanovich; Harry Carey, Jr. Clint Eastwood; Henry Fonda; John Ford; Walter Hill; Maureen O'Hara; Martin Scorsese; Steven Spielberg; James Stewart; John Wayne
- Narrated by: Orson Welles
- Cinematography: László Kovács; Brick Marquard; David Sammons; Gregory Sandor; Eric Sherman; Patrick Alexander Stewart
- Edited by: Mark Fitzgerald; Richard Patterson
- Music by: Gaylord Carter
- Production company: American Film Institute
- Release date: October 6, 1971
- Running time: 1971: 99 minutes 2006: 108 minutes
- Country: United States
- Language: English

Directed by John Ford is a documentary film directed by Peter Bogdanovich. Originally released in 1971, it covers the life and career of film director John Ford.

== Production ==
Bogdanovich first met John Ford in 1963, on the set of Ford's film Cheyenne Autumn, interviewing the veteran filmmaker for a piece in Esquire magazine, one in a series of profiles of famous directors. Ford, who typically despised interviews, perversely decided to be accommodating after he witnessed a production assistant warning Bogdanovich and his then-wife Polly Platt about Ford's difficult nature. Ford occasionally found himself exasperated by Bogdanovich's questions, but also enjoyed his company, and amused himself by needling the young man and pulling his leg. Bogdanovich's Esquire piece temporarily produced some measure of friction between the two, as Bogdanovich did not remove the profanity from Ford's quotes in his initial draft, to Ford's displeasure. Ford described it as "nauseating". He was also unhappy with the tone of the piece, entitled "The Autumn of John Ford", because he resented the implication that his time as a director was nearing its end. Despite this, Bogdanovich and Ford remained friends. In 1967, Bogdanovich completed an interview book about Ford, which was published in England. Ford affected a lack of interest in the work, describing it as "a caricature" and claiming that he threw his copy away after reading the first three pages, though in reality, he purchased more than 200 copies. The next year, Bogdanovich began working on Directed by John Ford.

Bogdanovich conducted interviews with actors Henry Fonda, James Stewart, and John Wayne, as well as Ford himself. Orson Welles delivered an original narration, which was recorded in a Howard Johnson's while Welles was directing The Other Side of the Wind, during a 20-minute break in filming. Bogdanovich also interviewed Ford in Monument Valley, a location Ford had used in some of his own films, producing footage that Bogdanovich described as "one of the funnier sequences in the picture". Ford, who was partially deaf and who did not enjoy discussing his work, would routinely make interviewers sit on the side of his bad ear, and then indicate that he was unable to understand the questions he was being asked. Whenever his interrogators ultimately succeeded in making themselves understood, he would deliver only monosyllabic responses. Ford's behavior in his interview with Bogdanovich accordingly delivered little useful information, but it pleased Bogdanovich anyway because he felt that it was an accurate depiction of Ford's character.

During production, the American Film Institute exhausted its funding and was unable to purchase the rights to the film clips of Ford's work used in the documentary. As a result, the film could only be shown in non-profit venues, such as free screenings at film festivals or one fundraiser for PBS. For this reason, it was rarely seen after its initial release.

== Revised version ==
Bogdanovich had long been dissatisfied with the initial version of the film, for several reasons. In addition to the rights issues, he felt that some of the film clips used came across as "a little long and lugubrious", and he was unhappy that the film did not go into sufficient depth when exploring certain aspects of Ford's personal life, which were either unknown at the time the film was made or too controversial to include during Ford's lifetime.

The original version of Directed by John Ford was shown at the 1999 Telluride Film Festival, garnering a strong positive reaction, and this success led Bogdanovich to believe that a re-edited version might be a viable option. He delivered a pitch to producer Frank Marshall, an old friend with whom he had first worked on the 1968 film Targets, promising to "use all the good stuff and do some interviews with new people and jazz it up a little bit and make it more commercial, faster and incisive, and also more revealing." Marshall, in turn, brokered a deal with Turner Classic Movies and Warner Home Video.

When re-editing the film, Bogdanovich started with the original set of interviews with Fonda, Ford, Stewart, and Wayne, as well as the Welles narration. To supplement them, he conducted additional interviews with actors Harry Carey Jr., Clint Eastwood and Maureen O'Hara, and directors Martin Scorsese, Steven Spielberg, and Walter Hill. He also recorded some additional commentary of his own.

On 7 November 2006, the revised documentary was aired on the Turner Classic Movies channel, as part of a month-long tribute to Ford.

On 15 September 2009, the revised documentary was released on DVD.

== Critical reception ==
=== 1971 version ===
An unattributed review in Time characterized the initial cut of the film as a "piece of lightweight scholarship", in which Ford's "every blemish is a virtue, and no detail is too trivial to examine." Though dismissive of Bogdanovich's critical analysis within the film, the reviewer was more positive about the interview segments, in which Fonda, Stewart, and Wayne displayed the "terror and awe" of young and callow actors when discussing Ford. Reviewing the film for The New York Times, critic Roger Greenspun praised it as "workmanlike, amusing, [and] instructive," and noted that on several occasions he was "moved literally to tears" while watching it. However, he also expressed disappointment that the film did not place the end of Ford's career into what he felt to be the proper context, ignoring films such as Donovan's Reef and 7 Women, and glossing over the modest critical and box-office reception that characterized the end of Ford's career.

Ford was honored at a high-profile Hollywood event on November 23, 1973, which included a showing of Directed by John Ford. When asked what he had thought of the film, Ford had said that it was "long, and the print was bad".

=== 2006 version ===
In a review published in Variety, Todd McCarthy was largely positive. He praised the interviews with Fonda, Stewart, and Wayne, describing them as "possessing an extraordinary here-and-now immediacy", and found the interview with Ford "hilarious". He was less enthusiastic about some of the newer interviews, which were shot on video, feeling that they lacked the "vibrant look" and "elegant mobility" of the earlier interviews, recorded on film by a dolly-mounted camera. He did, however, single out Lindsay Anderson's 1992 interview with Maureen O'Hara, a deathbed recording of Ford speaking with Katharine Hepburn, and a more honest treatment of Ford's personal life illustrated by scenes from How Green Was My Valley as worthwhile additions to the updated version.

== Bogdanovich and Ford ==
According to Bogdanovich, Ford was instrumental in breaking up a planned film, The Streets of Laredo (after the song of that name), that Bogdanovich would have directed. It was to have starred Fonda, Stewart, and Wayne, but Bogdanovich claims that Ford talked Wayne out of participating, causing the project's collapse. Bogdanovich voiced the belief that the work "would have been my masterpiece," but was unwilling to speak about Ford's motives in acting as he did. The screenplay, written by Larry McMurtry, author of the source novel of Bogdanovich's The Last Picture Show, would become the basis of McMurtry's novel Lonesome Dove.

Bogdanovich later developed a one-man stage show called Sacred Monsters, in which he related anecdotes about his filmmaking career and performed impressions, including one of Ford.

== See also ==
- List of American films of 1971
