= She's Funny That Way (film) =

2014 American film by Peter Bogdanovich

- Theatrical release poster
- Directed by: Peter Bogdanovich
- Written by: Louise Stratten; Peter Bogdanovich
- Produced by: Holly Wiersma; Logan Levy; Louise Stratton; George Drakoulias
- Starring: Owen Wilson; Imogen Poots; Kathryn Hahn; Will Forte; Cybill Shepherd; Austin Pendleton; Joanna Lumley; Richard Lewis; Rhys Ifans; Jennifer Aniston
- Cinematography: Yaron Orbach
- Edited by: Nick Moore; Pax Wassermann
- Music by: Edward Shearmur
- Production companies: Lagniappe Films; Venture Forth; Three Point Capital; Lailaps Pictures; Holly Wiersma Productions
- Distributed by: Lionsgate Premiere (United States); Wild Bunch (Germany)
- Release dates: August 29, 2014 (Venice); August 20, 2015 (Germany); August 21, 2015 (United States)
- Running time: 94 minutes 123 minutes (Director's cut)
- Countries: United States; Germany
- Language: English
- Budget: $10 million
- Box office: $6 million

She's Funny That Way is a 2014 screwball comedy film directed by Peter Bogdanovich and co-written with Louise Stratten. It stars Owen Wilson, Imogen Poots, Kathryn Hahn, Will Forte, Rhys Ifans, and Jennifer Aniston. It marked the first feature film Bogdanovich directed in 13 years since The Cat's Meow. In addition, the film marked Bogdanovich's final non-documentary feature he directed and Richard Lewis' final theatrical film before their deaths in 2022 and 2024 respectively.

It received a limited release in the United States and was released through video on demand on August 21, 2015, by Lionsgate Premiere. The film received mixed reviews from critics.

A director's cut with its originally intended title Squirrels to the Nuts was released in 2025.

== Plot ==
Broadway director Arnold Albertson—under the alias "Derek"—hires "Glo Stick", a call girl whose real name is Izzy Finklestein, despite Arnold being married with two children. Izzy dreams of becoming an actress, and "Derek" offers her $30,000 to quit being a call girl and pursue her true goal. She is not the first escort he has done this for. Lead actor Seth Gilbert sees Arnold kissing Izzy as she leaves his hotel room.

Arnold's wife Delta Simmons is the star of his new play A Grecian Evening. Izzy, keeping her promise to "Derek", shows up to audition for a part in the play as a call girl, unaware that Derek/Arnold is the director. Impressed, playwright Joshua Fleet becomes attracted to Izzy and invites her out to dinner, despite the fact that he is dating Jane Claremont, who happens to be Izzy's therapist. Meanwhile, Judge Pendergast is another client of Izzy's, and also a patient of Jane. He is obsessed with Izzy, and hires private investigator Harold Fleet, who happens to be Joshua's father, to follow her.

After the auditions, everyone ends up at the same Italian restaurant. Harold sees Izzy with his son Joshua. Jane arrives with her client Judge Pendergast—who both see Joshua with Izzy. Jane punches Joshua in the face and storms out of the restaurant, quickly pursued by Judge Pendergast. Izzy sees Arnold and tries to escape out of the bathroom window, but Delta catches her and brings her back into the restaurant. Izzy's cover is almost blown when Seth arrives with a co-worker of Izzy's.

Although Arnold is initially unsure, Izzy is eventually given the role. While shopping, Delta discovers that Arnold has been hiring escorts when Margie, another former escort Arnold helped, thanks him profusely and indiscreetly. Joshua learns about Izzy when Judge Pendergast confronts the two of them while they are on a date; she runs off before he can talk to her. Arnold invites Izzy back to his hotel room to talk. Delta turns to Seth, who has long professed his love for her, for comfort, but finds another call girl hiding in his bathroom. She then storms into Arnold's room, only to find Izzy hiding in his bathroom.

Everyone shows up to the first table read the next day, despite the tension. Delta makes a point of kissing Seth passionately while rehearsing. Izzy's father shows up looking for the men who paid his daughter for sex. Jane shows up to cause a scene and identifies Judge Pendergast, Arnold, and Joshua as Izzy's clients. During the commotion, Seth and Jane catch each other's eye.

The play opens to great acclaim. In an interview some time later, Izzy says that it closed in a week because wives from Long Island are not interested in seeing a play about call girls. Nevertheless, she caught the attention of a man from Hollywood, and has achieved success as a film actress since. She and Joshua broke up; she is now dating Quentin Tarantino. Seth and Jane are still dating. Judge Pendergast was arrested for solicitation. His wife is now dating Harold Fleet. Arnold now works for a charity giving large sums of money to women's causes.

== Cast ==
- Owen Wilson as Arnold Albertson
- Imogen Poots as Isabella "Izzy" Patterson
- Kathryn Hahn as Delta Simmons
- Will Forte as Joshua Fleet
- Rhys Ifans as Seth Gilbert
- Jennifer Aniston as Jane Claremont
- Austin Pendleton as Judge Pendergast
- George Morfogen as Harold Fleet
- Cybill Shepherd as Nettie Patterson
- Richard Lewis as Al Patterson
- Sydney Lucas as Josie Albertson
- Debi Mazar as Vickie, a madam and former prostitute Arnold helped.
- Illeana Douglas as Judy
- Jennifer Esposito as Margie, a former prostitute Arnold helped.
- Tovah Feldshuh as Mrs. Miriam Pendergast
- Joanna Lumley as Vivian Claremont
- John Robinson as Andre
- Ahna O'Reilly as Elizabeth, a former prostitute Arnold helped.
- Lucy Punch as Kandi
- Poppy Delevingne as Macy's Greeter
- John Tormey as Hot Dog Vendor

Cameos

- Tatum O'Neal
- Jake Hoffman
- Graydon Carter
- Quentin Tarantino
- Michael Shannon

== Production ==
=== Development ===
She's Funny That Way originated in the mid-1990s when People reported the film would be going into pre-production, with the title Squirrels to the Nuts and featuring Tatum O'Neal in the leading role. Peter Bogdanovich, who had worked with O'Neal on Paper Moon (1973) and Nickelodeon (1976), was quoted as saying "This movie is my gift to her." The script was co-written with his ex-wife Louise Stratten around 1999 and 2000. Bogdanovich and Stratten, who were in financial distress at the time trying to buy back They All Laughed (1981), decided to write a comedy to uplift their spirits. While writing the script, Bogdanovich was inspired by an incident in Singapore during the time he was filming Saint Jack in 1978, where he was able to talk to many prostitutes after hiring them for his film. He would give them more money than their salary for them to leave the prostitution business. Due to many people misinterpreting it as a children's film, Bogdanovich changed the title from Squirrels to the Nuts to She's Funny That Way. ("Squirrels to the Nuts" is a line used frequently in the film, lifted from the 1946 film Cluny Brown.) Bogdanovich originally wrote the role of Arnold Albertson for John Ritter, but due to his death, he shelved the project. Bogdanovich later became friends with Owen Wilson, introduced to him by Wes Anderson, and he decided to change aspects of the character of Albertson: all of the physical gags intended for Ritter were changed to verbal jokes to suit Wilson. In 2010, Bogdanovich's protégés—Anderson and Noah Baumbach—offered their backing to get the film made, agreeing to serve as executive producers.

=== Casting ===
When the script was originally written, Bogdanovich envisioned John Ritter, Cybill Shepherd and co-writer Louise Stratten in the lead roles. In 2012, when the film was officially announced, Wilson, Brie Larson, and Olivia Wilde were signed on in lead roles. Larson was to play the call girl-turned-ingenue actress and Wilde would play the role of her therapist. Jason Schwartzman was also rumored to be in negotiations to play Wilde's playwright boyfriend. Due to production delays, Wilson is the only actor to remain with the project. In February 2013, it was announced that Jennifer Aniston would replace Wilde in the role of the therapist, the same time Kathryn Hahn, Cybill Shepherd, and Eugene Levy were announced as cast members. Aniston was initially offered the part of Delta Simmons, Arnold Albertson's wife, but she favored the role of the therapist, in which she was cast. Despite the commencement of filming on July 11, 2013, Imogen Poots and Richard Lewis were announced for roles of the ingenue and her father on July 22, with Will Forte taking the role of a playwright two days later. The same week, the casting of Joanna Lumley, Debi Mazar, Rhys Ifans, Lucy Punch, Ahna O'Reilly, and Jake Hoffman was set.

=== Filming ===
Principal photography lasted 29 days, commencing on July 11, 2013, in New York City. Bogdanovich's original version, titled Squirrels to the Nuts lasted 113 minutes. However, he was compelled to change the film (along with its title) in order to get a release, which saw the eventual 94 minute version released to theaters that saw a modified opening and ending, deletions of music (such as the stylings of Frank Sinatra and Tom Petty), and a framing device of an interview that cuts in and out through the film.

=== Music ===
On July 15, 2014, Edward Shearmur was hired to score the music for the film, replacing Stephen Endelman, who had already recorded music for the film by the time of the announcement.

Soundtrack

- "Cheek to Cheek", written by Irving Berlin, performed by Fred Astaire
- "Bill Bailey", arranged by Zoot Sims (as John H. Sims), performed by Zoot Sims
- "Yankee Doodle", written by Richard Shuckburgh (uncredited), arranged by Ben Ashford
- "Coco Beach", written and performed by David N. Wilson
- "Lovers and Friends", performed by Frank & Friends
- "Gabrielle", written by Charlotte Politte, performed by Charlotte Politte Trio
- "Pass the Sauce", written by Marty Wereski (as Martin Wereski), performed by The JL Pasta Band
- "Through the Years", written and performed by Anthony T. Hiebert
- "Steppin' Out With My Baby", written by Irving Berlin, performed by Fred Astaire

== Release ==
She's Funny That Way premiered at the 71st Venice International Film Festival on August 29, 2014. On September 12, it was bought by Clarius Entertainment at the 2014 Toronto International Film Festival. A screening at the Tokyo International Film Festival was scheduled for late October. In January 2015, the film was screened to the Palm Springs International Film Festival.

The film was originally scheduled for a May 1, 2015, release in theaters nationwide, but Clarius Entertainment pulled the film from the schedule. However, on June 2, 2015, Lionsgate Premiere acquired the film after Clarius Entertainment dropped the film for unknown reasons. The film was released in the United States on August 21, 2015, in select theaters and through video on demand.

=== Versions ===
In 2020, a copy of Bogdanovich's original cut of the film, still titled Squirrels to the Nuts, was found on eBay by James Kenney, an English lecturer at City University of New York. In the wake of Bogdanovich's death in January 2022, the cut was shown at New York's Museum of Modern Art beginning on March 28, 2022. A 123-minute Director's Cut of Squirrels to the Nuts restored by Bogdanovich prior to his death was presented by American Cinematheque at Grauman's Egyptian Theatre in Hollywood on February 8, 2025, prior to VOD release.

== Reception ==
Review aggregation website Rotten Tomatoes gives the film an approval rating of 46% based on 98 reviews, with an average rating of 5.30/10. The site's critical consensus states: "She's Funny That Way is an affectionate, talent-filled throwback to screwball comedies of old—which makes it even more frustrating that the laughs are disappointingly few and far between." Metacritic gives the film a weighted average score of 45 out of 100, based on 25 critics, indicating "mixed or average reviews".

Jennifer Aniston was nominated for Jupiter Award for Best International Actress.
