= Peter Bogdanovich =

American film director (1939–2022)

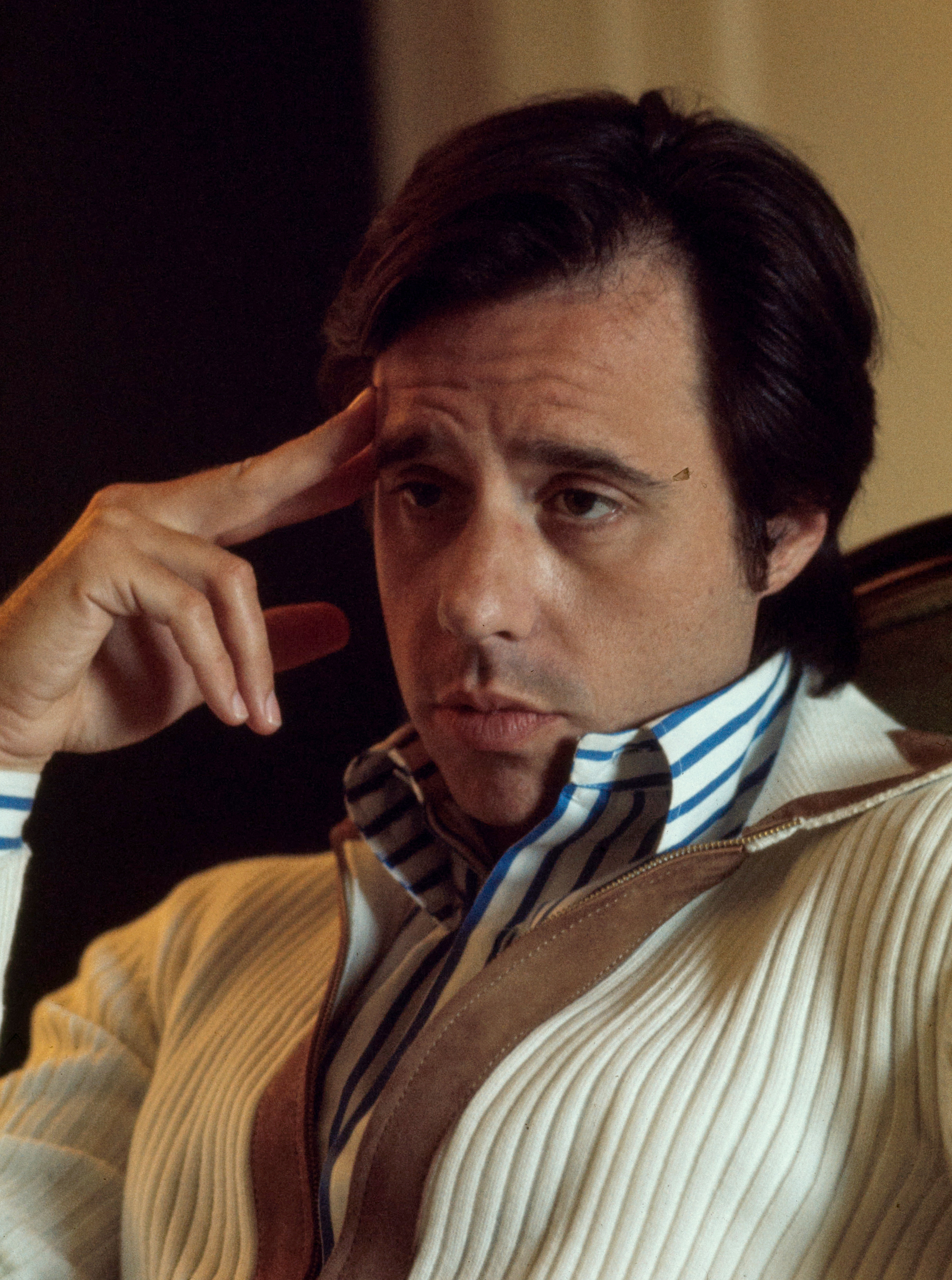
- Bogdanovich in 1973
- Born: July 30, 1939; Kingston, New York, U.S.
- Died: January 6, 2022 (aged 82); Toluca Lake, California, U.S.
- Resting place: Westwood Village Memorial Park Cemetery
- Occupations: Film director; screenwriter; film producer; actor; film critic; film historian
- Years active: 1959–2022
- Spouse(s): Polly Platt (m. 1962; div. 1971) Louise Stratten (m. 1988; div. 2001)
- Partner(s): Cybill Shepherd (1970–1978); Dorothy Stratten (1980)
- Children: 2

Peter Bogdanovich (July 30, 1939 – January 6, 2022) was an American filmmaker, actor, critic, and film historian. He started out his career as a young actor studying under Stella Adler before working as a journalist for Film Culture and Esquire and finally becoming a prominent filmmaker of the New Hollywood movement. He received accolades including a BAFTA Award and Grammy Award, as well as nominations for two Academy Awards and two Golden Globe Awards.

Bogdanovich worked as a film journalist until he was hired to work on Roger Corman's The Wild Angels (1966). His credited feature film debut came with Targets (1968), before his career breakthrough with the drama The Last Picture Show (1971) which earned him Academy Award nominations for Best Director and Best Adapted Screenplay, and the acclaimed films What's Up, Doc? (1972) and Paper Moon (1973). Other films include Saint Jack (1979), They All Laughed (1981), Mask (1985), Noises Off (1992), The Cat's Meow (2001), and She's Funny That Way (2014).

As an actor, Bogdanovich was known for his roles in the HBO series The Sopranos and Orson Welles' last film, The Other Side of the Wind (2018), which he also helped finish.

Bogdanovich directed documentaries such as Directed by John Ford (1971) and The Great Buster: A Celebration (2018). He received a Grammy Award for Best Music Film for directing Runnin' Down a Dream (2007), a documentary about Tom Petty and the Heartbreakers. He also published numerous books, some of which include in-depth interviews with friends Howard Hawks, Alfred Hitchcock, and Orson Welles. Bogdanovich's works have been cited as important influences by many major filmmakers.

== Early life ==
Peter Bogdanovich (Serbian Cyrillic: Петар Богдановић) was born in Kingston, New York, the son of Herma (née Robinson) and Borislav Bogdanovich, a pianist and painter. His father was of Serbian descent and his mother was of Austrian Jewish descent. Bogdanovich was fluent in Serbian, having learned it before English. He had an older brother who died in an accident in 1938, at eighteen months of age, after a pot of boiling soup fell on him, though Bogdanovich did not learn about his brother until he was seven and did not know the circumstances of his death until he was an adult. His parents both arrived in the U.S. in May 1939 on visitors' visas, along with his mother's immediate family, three months before the onset of World War II.

At the age of twelve, Bogdanovich began keeping a record of every film he saw on yellow index cards, complete with reviews; he continued to do so until 1970. He saw up to four hundred films a year. He graduated from New York City's Collegiate School in 1957 and studied acting at the Stella Adler Conservatory.

== Career ==
=== 1960s ===
In the early 1960s, Bogdanovich was known as a film programmer at the Museum of Modern Art in New York City, where he programmed influential retrospectives and wrote monographs for the films of Orson Welles, John Ford, Howard Hawks, and Alfred Hitchcock. Bogdanovich also brought attention to Allan Dwan, a pioneer of American film who had fallen into obscurity by then, in a 1971 retrospective Dwan attended. He also programmed for New Yorker Theater.

Before becoming a director, he wrote for Esquire, The Saturday Evening Post, and Cahiers du Cinéma as a film critic. These articles were collected in Pieces of Time (1973).

In 1966, following the example of Cahiers du Cinéma critics François Truffaut, Jean-Luc Godard, Claude Chabrol, and Éric Rohmer, who had created the Nouvelle Vague ("New Wave") by making their own films, Bogdanovich decided to become a director. Encouraged by director Frank Tashlin, whom he would interview in his book Who the Devil Made It, Bogdanovich headed for Los Angeles with his wife Polly Platt and in so doing, left his rent unpaid.

Intent on breaking into the industry, Bogdanovich would ask publicists for movie premiere and industry party invitations. At one screening, Bogdanovich was viewing a film and director Roger Corman was sitting behind him. The two struck up a conversation when Corman mentioned he liked a cinema piece Bogdanovich wrote for Esquire. Corman offered him a directing job, which Bogdanovich accepted immediately. He worked with Corman on Targets, which starred Boris Karloff, and Voyage to the Planet of Prehistoric Women, under the pseudonym Derek Thomas. Bogdanovich later said of the Corman school of filmmaking, "I went from getting the laundry to directing the picture in three weeks. Altogether, I worked 22 weeks – preproduction, shooting, second unit, cutting, dubbing – I haven't learned as much since."

=== 1970s ===
Returning to journalism, Bogdanovich struck up a lifelong friendship with Orson Welles while interviewing him on the set of Mike Nichols' Catch-22. Bogdanovich played a major role in reviving Welles and his career with his writings on the actor-director, particularly through his rebuttal, in the pages of Esquire, of Pauline Kael's book The Citizen Kane Book: Raising Kane, a 1971 attack on the centrality of Welles' contribution to the film. (Bogdanovich's book-length interview with Welles, This Is Orson Welles, was not released until 1992.) In the early 1970s, when Welles was having financial problems, Bogdanovich let him stay at his Bel Air mansion for a couple of years.

In 1970, Bogdanovich was commissioned by the American Film Institute to direct a documentary about John Ford for their tribute, Directed by John Ford. The resulting film included candid interviews with John Wayne, James Stewart, and Henry Fonda, and was narrated by Orson Welles. Out of circulation for years due to licensing issues, Bogdanovich and TCM released it in 2006, re-edited it to make it "faster and more incisive", with additional interviews with Clint Eastwood, Walter Hill, Harry Carey Jr., Martin Scorsese, Steven Spielberg, and others.

Much of the inspiration that led Bogdanovich to his cinematic creations came from early viewings of the film Citizen Kane. In an interview with Robert K. Elder, author of The Film That Changed My Life, Bogdanovich explains his appreciation of Orson Welles' work:

It's just not like any other movie you know. It's the first modern film: fragmented, not told straight ahead, jumping around. It anticipates everything that's being done now, and which is thought to be so modern. It's all become really decadent now, but it was certainly fresh then.

The 32-year-old Bogdanovich was hailed by critics as a "Wellesian" wunderkind when his best-received film, The Last Picture Show, was released in 1971. The film earned eight Academy Award nominations, including Best Director, and won two statues, for Cloris Leachman and Ben Johnson in the supporting acting categories. Bogdanovich co-wrote the screenplay with Larry McMurtry, and it won the 1971 BAFTA Award for Best Screenplay. Bogdanovich cast the 21-year-old model Cybill Shepherd in a major role in the film and fell in love with her, an affair leading to his divorce from Polly Platt, his longtime artistic collaborator and the mother of his two daughters.

Bogdanovich followed up The Last Picture Show with the screwball comedy What's Up, Doc?, starring Barbra Streisand and Ryan O'Neal. Bogdanovich then formed The Directors Company with Francis Ford Coppola and William Friedkin and co-owned by Paramount Pictures. Paramount allowed the directors to make a minimum of twelve films with a budget of $3 million each. It was through this entity that Bogdanovich's Paper Moon was produced.

Paper Moon, a Depression-era comedy starring Ryan O'Neal that won his 10-year-old daughter Tatum O'Neal an Oscar as Best Supporting Actress, proved the high-water mark of Bogdanovich's career. Forced to share the profits with his fellow directors, Bogdanovich became dissatisfied with the arrangement. The Directors Company subsequently produced only two more pictures, Coppola's The Conversation (1974, which was nominated for Best Picture in 1974 alongside The Godfather Part II), and Bogdanovich's Cybill Shepherd vehicle, Daisy Miller, which had a lackluster critical reception and was a disappointment at the box office. The partners of The Directors Company all went their separate ways after the production of Daisy Miller.

Bogdanovich's next effort, At Long Last Love, was a musical starring Shepherd and Burt Reynolds. Both that and his next film, Nickelodeon, were critical and box-office disasters, severely damaging his standing in the film community. Reflecting upon his recent career, Bogdanovich said in 1976, "I was dumb. I made a lot of mistakes."

In 1975, he sued Universal for breaching a contract to produce and direct Bugsy. He then took a few years off, then returned to directing with a lower-budgeted film, Saint Jack, which was filmed in Singapore and starred Ben Gazzara in the title role. The film earned critical praise, although was neither a box-office hit. The making of this film marked the end of his romantic relationship with Cybill Shepherd.

=== 1980s ===
Bogdanovich's next film was the romantic comedy They All Laughed which featured Dorothy Stratten, a former model and Playboy Playmate of the Month for August 1979 and Playmate of the Year in 1980, who began a romantic relationship with Bogdanovich. He took over distribution of They All Laughed himself. Bogdanovich later blamed this for his filing for bankruptcy in 1985. He declared he had a monthly income of $75,000 and monthly expenses of $200,000.

Shortly after the film finished shooting, Stratten was murdered by her estranged husband Paul Snider, who then killed himself. To cope with the tragedy, Bogdanovich began writing The Killing of the Unicorn, a memoir detailing the relationship between Stratten and himself, the making of They All Laughed and her murder. "I wanted to understand what happened to her," said Bogdanovich, "I felt I couldn't move forward with my life, creative or otherwise until I did." Bogdanovich said the book was meant to be delivered to William Morrow and Company in August 1982, "but new facts kept coming to light and so it was delayed. I did more and more rewriting. In all, I suppose, I wrote the book five times." The book was eventually published in 1984.

Stratten's murder was highly publicized, with Teresa Carpenter's "Death of a Playmate" article even claiming that she was as much a victim of Bogdanovich and Playboy mogul Hugh Hefner as she was Snider's victim. Carpenter's article then served as the basis for Bob Fosse's film Star 80. Bogdanovich opposed the production and refused to allow the film to use his name. He was portrayed as the fictional "Aram Nicholas", and he threatened litigation if he found the character objectionable. Shortly after, Hefner accused Bogdanovich of seducing Stratten's younger sister Louise when she was 13. On December 30, 1988, the 49-year-old Bogdanovich married 20-year-old Louise, sparking a tabloid frenzy.

After Stratten's murder, Bogdanovich said he "didn't go out much", but one day got a call from his friend John Cassavetes who asked him to direct Diahnne Abbott in a scene from his film Love Streams to help get him out of the house. Despite Bogdanovich's contribution to the film, which even he himself admitted was minor, Cassavetes tried to get the Directors Guild to give him a shared credit.

Bogdanovich had wanted to make I'll Remember April with Cassavetes and The Lady in the Moon written with Larry McMurtry, but returned to directing officially with Mask, which was released in 1985 to critical acclaim and strong box office returns. The film was released with a song score by Bob Seger against Bogdanovich's wishes (he favored Bruce Springsteen). A director's cut of the film, slightly longer and with Springsteen's songs, was belatedly released on DVD in 2004.

Bogdanovich directed the comedy Illegally Yours in 1988, starring Rob Lowe. Bogdanovich later disowned the film, saying he had "high hopes for it", but that it had been completely re-cut by Dino De Laurentiis, the film's distributor.

=== 1990s ===
In 1990, Bogdanovich adapted Larry McMurtry's novel Texasville, a sequel to The Last Picture Show, into a film. It is set 32 years after the events of The Last Picture Show, and Jeff Bridges and Cybill Shepherd both reprised their roles as Duane and Jacy. It was a critical and box office disappointment relative to the first film. Bogdanovich often complained that the version of Texasville that was released was not the film he had intended. His cut of Texasville was later released on LaserDisc, and the theatrical cut was released on DVD by MGM in 2005. After the release of Texasville, Bogdanovich revisited The Last Picture Show and produced a modified director's cut for The Criterion Collection which includes seven minutes of previously unseen footage and re-edited scenes.

In 1991, Bogdanovich developed an alternative calendar, titled A Year and a Day: Goddess Engagement Calendar. The calendar consisted of 13 months of 28 days and a bonus day to equal 365 days. Each month was named after a different species of tree. Bogdanovich attributed his inspiration for the calendar to the works of Robert Graves.

Bogdanovich directed two more theatrical films in 1992 and 1993, but neither film recaptured the success of his early career. One, Noises Off, was based on a stage play by Michael Frayn, while another, The Thing Called Love, is better known as one of River Phoenix's last roles before his death. In the mid-90s, Bogdanovich began to work in television, directing films such as To Sir, with Love II. In 1997, he declared bankruptcy again. Drawing from his encyclopedic knowledge of film history, he wrote several critically lauded books, including Who the Devil Made It, featuring archival interviews that Bogdanovich had held with famous Hollywood directors, and Peter Bogdanovich's Movie of the Week, which offered the lifelong cinephile's commentary on 52 of his favorite films.

=== 2000s ===
In 2001, Bogdanovich resurfaced with The Cat's Meow, his return once again to a reworking of the past, this time the alleged killing of director Thomas Ince by William Randolph Hearst. The film was a modest critical success but made little money at the box office. Bogdanovich said that he was told the story of the alleged Ince murder by Welles, who in turn said he heard it from writer Charles Lederer.

In addition to directing some television work, Bogdanovich returned to acting with a recurring guest role on the cable television series The Sopranos, playing Dr. Melfi's psychotherapist, also later directing a fifth-season episode. He had a voice role, as Bart Simpson's therapist's analyst in an episode of The Simpsons, and appeared as himself in the "Robots Versus Wrestlers" episode of How I Met Your Mother. Quentin Tarantino cast Bogdanovich as a disc jockey in Kill Bill: Volume 1 and Kill Bill: Volume 2. "Quentin knows, because he's such a movie buff, that when you hear a disc jockey's voice in my pictures, it's always me, sometimes doing different voices", said Bogdanovich. "So he called me and he said, 'I stole your voice from The Last Picture Show for the rough cut, but I need you to come down and do that voice again for my picture ... '" He hosted The Essentials on Turner Classic Movies, but was replaced in May 2006 by TCM host Robert Osborne and film critic Molly Haskell. Bogdanovich hosted introductions to movies on Criterion Collection DVDs, and had a supporting role in the critically praised mini-series Out of Order.

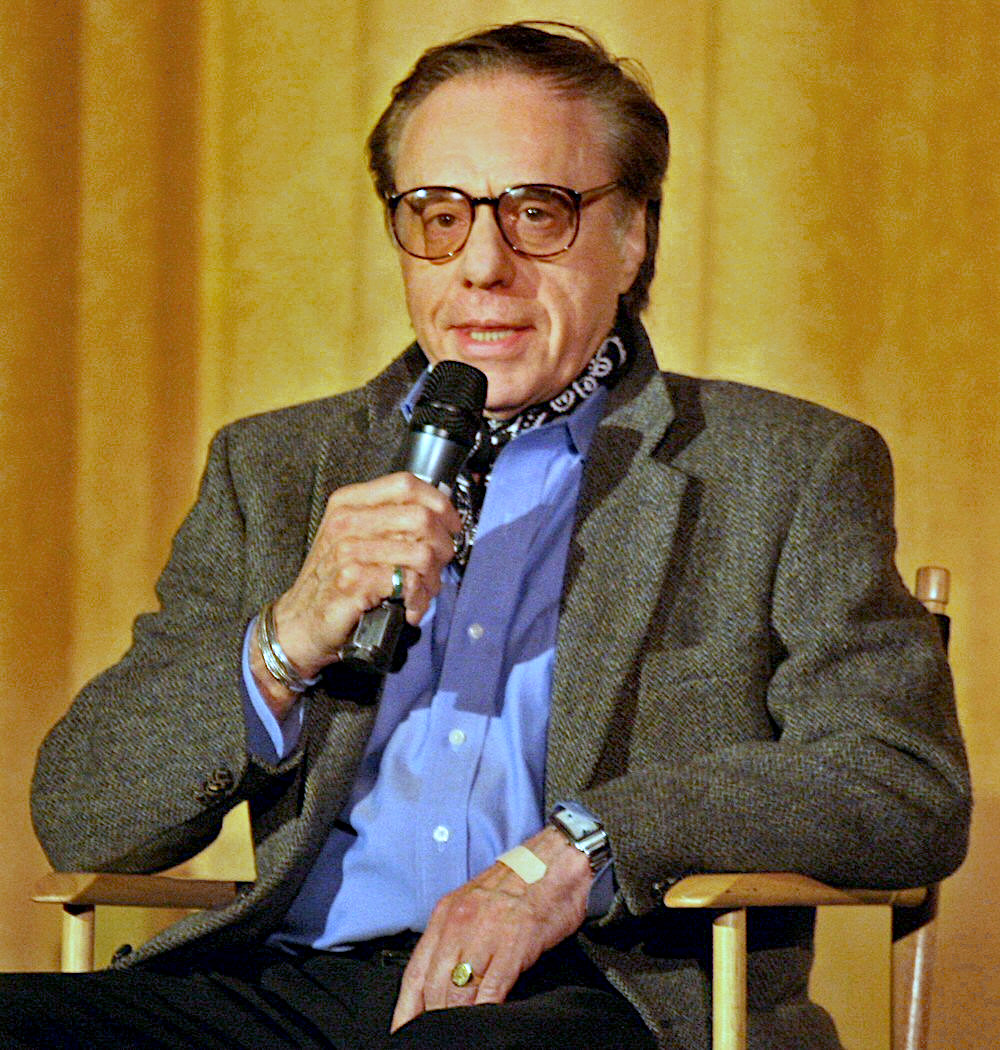
Bogdanovich at the Castro Theatre, 2008

In 2006, Bogdanovich joined forces with ClickStar, where he hosted a classic film channel, Peter Bogdanovich's Golden Age of Movies. Bogdanovich also wrote a blog for the site. In 2003, he appeared in the BBC documentary Easy Riders, Raging Bulls, and in 2006 he appeared in the documentary Wanderlust. The following year, Bogdanovich was presented with an award for outstanding contribution to film preservation by the International Federation of Film Archives (FIAF) at the Toronto International Film Festival.

=== 2010s ===
In 2010, Bogdanovich joined the directing faculty at the School of Filmmaking at the University of North Carolina School of the Arts. On April 17, 2010, he was awarded the Master of Cinema Award at the 12th Annual RiverRun International Film Festival. In 2011, he was given the Auteur Award by the International Press Academy, which is awarded to filmmakers whose singular vision and unique artistic control over the elements of production give a personal and signature style to their films.

In 2012, Bogdanovich made news with an essay in The Hollywood Reporter, published in the aftermath of the Aurora, Colorado, theater shooting, in which he argued against excessive violence in the movies:

Today, there's a general numbing of the audience. There's too much murder and killing. You make people insensitive by showing it all the time. The body count in pictures is huge. It numbs the audience into thinking it's not so terrible. Back in the '70s, I asked Orson Welles what he thought was happening to pictures, and he said, 'We're brutalizing the audience. We're going to end up like the Roman circus, live at the Coliseum.' The respect for human life seems to be eroding.

In 2014, Bogdanovich's last narrative film, She's Funny That Way, was released in theaters and on-demand, albeit not in the version that he intended, as 29 minutes were removed from the release. His director's cut, with the original intended title Squirrels to the Nuts, resurfaced in 2020 and was released digitally in 2025. Bogdanovich directed once more with the documentary, The Great Buster: A Celebration in 2018. In 2018, Orson Welles' long-delayed film The Other Side of the Wind, which was filmed in the 1970s and featured a prominent supporting role by Bogdanovich, who had long hoped to complete it, was released by Netflix to critical acclaim.

One of his final hopes was to direct a personal passion project he had worked on since the 1980s titled Wait for Me which Bogdanovich had described as a "ghost picture", the likes of The Ghost Goes West, that was directly inspired by his relationship with Dorothy Stratten. In a July 2015 interview for Entertainment Weekly, Bogdanovich revealed that Brett Ratner was going to produce the film, and that they were currently in the process of attaching actors. The plot, as described by Bogdanovich, would have followed a washed-up Hollywood director/star (someone like Orson Welles or Charlie Chaplin), who is visited by the ghost of his last wife, who was killed six years earlier in a plane crash.

=== 2020s ===
Bogdanovich collaborated with Turner Classic Movies, and host Ben Mankiewicz, to create a documentary podcast about his life, which premiered in 2020. That same year, a copy of his original cut of She's Funny That Way, originally titled Squirrels to the Nuts, was found on eBay. In the wake of the director's death, the cut was shown at New York's Museum of Modern Art beginning on March 28, 2022.

Weeks before his death, Bogdanovich collaborated with Kim Basinger to create LIT Project 2: Flux, a first of its kind short film made available on the Ethereum blockchain as a non-fungible token. The project was scheduled to be released on January 25, 2022. He also wrote an as-yet unreleased book called Five American Icons featuring long interviews with Arthur Miller, Lauren Bacall, Kirk Douglas, Jack Nicholson and Clint Eastwood, and was working on developing a new screenplay, with the help of author Sam Kashner, titled Our Love Is Here to Stay about composers George and Ira Gershwin. According to Louise Stratten, after they had finished the script, Guillermo del Toro was involved to produce the film at Netflix.

== Death and legacy ==
Bogdanovich died from complications of Parkinson's disease at his home in Toluca Lake, on January 6, 2022, at the age of 82. Since his death, many directors, actors, and other public figures have paid tribute to him, including Martin Scorsese, Francis Ford Coppola, Jennifer Aniston, Barbra Streisand, Cher, William Friedkin, Guillermo del Toro, James Gunn, Ellen Burstyn, Laura Dern, Joe Dante, Bryan Adams, Ben Stiller, Jeff Bridges, Michael Imperioli, Paul Feig and Viola Davis. Peter Bradshaw of The Guardian described him as "a loving cineaste and fearless genius of cinema." The New York Times described Bogdanovich as "[a genius] of the Hollywood system who, with great success and frustration, worked to transform it in the same era."

His work has been cited as an influence by such filmmakers as Quentin Tarantino, David Fincher, Sofia Coppola, Wes Anderson, Noah Baumbach, Richard Linklater, Edgar Wright, Brett Ratner, M. Night Shyamalan, David O. Russell, James Mangold, Jon Watts, Rian Johnson, and the Safdie brothers.

On May 31, 2022, Louise Stratten announced that she was seeking a publisher for Bogdanovich's memoirs, as well as working on putting out episodes of a podcast series Bogdanovich had started called One Handshake Away, where contemporary filmmakers were invited to discuss and listen to archival recordings of classic Hollywood directors whom Bogdanovich had interviewed. Guests include Guillermo del Toro (ep. "Alfred Hitchcock"), Rian Johnson (ep. "Orson Welles"), Quentin Tarantino (ep. "Don Siegel"), and Ken Burns (ep. "John Ford"). The episodes eventually aired in February 2024, two years after Bogdanovich's death, through Audacy. Del Toro contributed three additional interviews with Greta Gerwig (ep. "Howard Hawks"), Julie Delpy (ep. "Fritz Lang") and Allison Anders (ep. "Raoul Walsh").

== Frequent collaborators ==
=== Cast ===
Work Actor	1968	1971	1972	1973	1974	1975	1976	1979	1981	1985	1988	1990	1992	1993	2001	2014	—N/a
Work Actor	Targets	The Last Picture Show	What's Up, Doc?	Paper Moon	Daisy Miller	At Long Last Love	Nickelodeon	Saint Jack	They All Laughed	Mask	Illegally Yours	Texasville	Noises Off	The Thing Called Love	The Cat's Meow	She's Funny That Way	Total
Earl Poole Ball									X mark		X mark	X mark		X mark			4
Timothy Bottoms		X mark										X mark					2
Eileen Brennan		X mark			X mark	X mark						X mark					4
Jeff Bridges		X mark										X mark					2
Jeffrey Byron						X mark	X mark										2
Colleen Camp									X mark		X mark					X mark	3
Harry Carey Jr.							X mark			X mark	X mark						3
Duilio Del Prete					X mark	X mark											2
Liam Dunn			X mark			X mark											2
Denholm Elliott								X mark					X mark				2
Ben Gazzara								X mark	X mark								2
Burton Gilliam				X mark		X mark											2
James Harrell				X mark								X mark					2
John Hillerman		X mark	X mark	X mark		X mark											4
Madeline Kahn			X mark	X mark		X mark											3
Cloris Leachman		X mark			X mark							X mark					3
Joanna Lumley															X mark	X mark	2
Kenneth Mars			X mark								X mark						2
Frank Marshall	X mark	X mark					X mark										3
Micole Mercurio										X mark				X mark			2
George Morfogen					X mark				X mark		X mark					X mark	4
Mildred Natwick					X mark	X mark											2
Ryan O'Neal			X mark	X mark			X mark										3
Tatum O'Neal				X mark			X mark									X mark	3
Austin Pendleton			X mark													X mark	2
Arthur Peterson	X mark					X mark											2
Burt Reynolds						X mark	X mark										2
John Ritter							X mark		X mark				X mark				3
Cybill Shepherd		X mark			X mark	X mark						X mark				X mark	5
Randy Quaid		X mark	X mark	X mark								X mark					4
M. Emmet Walsh			X mark			X mark	X mark										3
Noble Willingham		X mark		X mark													2

=== Crew ===
Cinematographer László Kovács worked with Bogdanovich on several of his films, those of which are Targets, the documentary Directed by John Ford, What's Up, Doc?, Paper Moon, At Long Last Love, Nickelodeon and Mask. Robby Müller however, shot only two films for Bogdanovich, Saint Jack and They All Laughed back-to-back. Editors who have collaborated with Bogdanovich include Verna Fields (What's Up, Doc?, Paper Moon and Daisy Miller), William C. Carruth (Nickelodeon, Saint Jack and They All Laughed) and Richard Fields (Illegally Yours and Texasville). Polly Platt, Bogdanovich's former wife, served as production designer and also as costume designer (uncredited) on Targets, The Last Picture Show, What's Up, Doc? and Paper Moon. Filmmaker Frank Marshall operated in several crew positions throughout Bogdanovich's filmography, such as location manager on The Last Picture Show and What's Up, Doc?, associate producer on Paper Moon and Daisy Miller, and producer on At Long Last Love, Nickelodeon, and Noises Off (also serving as second unit director on the last project).

== Filmography ==
Theatrical films
Year	Title	Distributor
1968	Targets	Paramount Pictures
1971	The Last Picture Show	Columbia Pictures
1972	What's Up, Doc?	Warner Bros.
1973	Paper Moon	Paramount Pictures
1974	Daisy Miller	Paramount Pictures
1975	At Long Last Love	20th Century Fox
1976	Nickelodeon	Columbia Pictures / EMI Films
1979	Saint Jack	New World Pictures
1981	They All Laughed	Moon Pictures / PSO
1985	Mask	Universal Pictures
1988	Illegally Yours	United Artists / De Laurentiis Entertainment Group
1990	Texasville	Columbia Pictures
1992	Noises Off	Buena Vista Pictures Distribution
1993	The Thing Called Love	Paramount Pictures
2001	The Cat's Meow	Swipe Films / Lions Gate Films
2014	She's Funny That Way	Lionsgate Premiere / Wild Bunch

Television films
Year	Title	Distributor
1996	To Sir, with Love II	CBS
1997	The Price of Heaven	CBS
1997	Rescuers: Stories of Courage: Two Women	Showtime
1998	Naked City: A Killer Christmas	Showtime
1999	A Saintly Switch	ABC
2004	The Mystery of Natalie Wood	ABC
2004	Hustle	ESPN

== Bibliography ==
- 1961: The Cinema of Orson Welles. New York: Museum of Modern Art Film Library. OCLC 982198898.
- 1962: The Cinema of Howard Hawks. New York: Museum of Modern Art Film Library. OCLC 868410545.
- 1963: The Cinema of Alfred Hitchcock. New York: Museum of Modern Art Film Library. OCLC 937577000.
- 1967: John Ford. London: Studio Vista. OCLC 868409009. Expanded edition: Berkeley: University of California, 1978. ISBN 9780520034983.
- 1967: Fritz Lang in America. London: Studio Vista. OCLC 469498600; New York: Praeger. OCLC 841184600.
- 1970: Allan Dwan: The Last Pioneer. Inglaterra: Studio Vista. OCLC 777766501.
- 1973: Pieces of Time. New York: Arbor House. OCLC 982199356. Expanded edition, 1985: Pieces of Time: Peter Bogdanovich on the Movies, 1961–1985. ISBN 9780877956969.
- 1974: Movies: Conversations with Peter Bogdanovich. Editor: Paul McCluskey. New York: Harcourt Brace Jovanovich. ISBN 978-0153187353
- 1984: The Killing of the Unicorn: Dorothy Stratten 1960–1980. William Morrow and Company. ISBN 0-688-01611-1.
- 1991: A Year and a Day Engagement Calendar 1992: A Desk Diary Adapted From the Works of Robert Graves. New York: Overlook Books. ISBN 978-0879514297.
- 1992: This Is Orson Welles. HarperPerennial. ISBN 0-06-092439-X.
- 1995: A Moment with Miss Gish. Santa Barbara: Santa Teresa Press. OCLC 34316185.
- 1997: Who the Devil Made It: Conversations with Legendary Film Directors. New York: Alfred A. Knopf. ISBN 0-679-44706-7.
- 1999: The Best American Movie Writing 1999. Editor. New York: St. Martin's Griffin. ISBN 978-0312244934.
- 1999: Peter Bogdanovich's Movie of the Week. New York: Ballantine Books. ISBN 9780345432056.
- 2004: Who the Hell's in It: Conversations with Hollywood's Legendary Actors. New York: Alfred A. Knopf. ISBN 0-375-40010-9.
- 2026: But What I Really Want to Do Is Direct. New York: HarperCollins. ISBN 978-0063443617. (upcoming)

== Audio commentaries ==
Bogdanovich appeared in dozens of film documentaries and featurettes, and recorded many home video audio commentaries for his own films and others.

- M (1931) – with others, and Fritz Lang interview excerpts
- Fury (1936) – with Lang interview excerpts
- Bringing Up Baby (1938)
- The Rules of the Game (1939) – reads; written by film scholar Alexander Sesonske
- Citizen Kane (1941)
- The Lady from Shanghai (1947)
- Wagon Master (1950) – with Harry Carey Jr., and John Ford interview excerpts
- Strangers on a Train (1951) – with others
- Othello (1951) – with Welles scholar Myron Meise
- Clash by Night (1952) – with Lang interview excerpts
- Land of the Pharaohs (1955) – with Howard Hawks interview excerpts
- To Catch a Thief (1955) – with Laurent Bouzereau
- The Searchers (1956)
- The Man Who Shot Liberty Valance (1962) – with John Ford and James Stewart interview excerpts
- El Dorado (1966)
- Targets (1968)
- The Last Picture Show (1971) – one solo, one with others
- What's Up, Doc? (1972)
- Paper Moon (1973)
- Saint Jack (1979)
- Daisy Miller (1974)
- The Killing of a Chinese Bookie (1976) – on selected scenes only
- They All Laughed (1981)
- The Sopranos: "Sentimental Education" (2004)

== Awards and honors ==
=== Awards and nominations ===
Year	Award	Category	Nominated work	Result
1972	Academy Awards	Best Director	The Last Picture Show	Nominated
1972	Academy Awards	Best Screenplay – Based on Material from Another Medium	The Last Picture Show	Nominated
1973	BAFTA Film Awards	Best Direction	The Last Picture Show	Nominated
1973	BAFTA Film Awards	Best Screenplay	The Last Picture Show	Won (Note: Tied with Paddy Chayefsky for The Hospital.)
1972	Directors Guild of America Awards	Outstanding Directorial Achievement in Motion Pictures	The Last Picture Show	Nominated
1972	Golden Globe Awards	Best Director – Motion Picture	The Last Picture Show	Nominated
1974	Golden Globe Awards	Best Director – Motion Picture	Paper Moon	Nominated

Accolades earned by Bogdanovich's theatrical features
Year	Feature	Academy Awards		BAFTAs		Golden Globes	
Year	Feature	Nominations	Wins	Nominations	Wins	Nominations	Wins
1971	The Last Picture Show	8	2	6	3	6	1
1972	What's Up, Doc?					1	
1973	Paper Moon	4	1			6	1
1974	Daisy Miller	1					
1979	Saint Jack			1			
1985	Mask	1	1	1		2	
Total		13	4	8	3	15	2

Directed Academy Award performances
Under Bogdanovich's direction, these actors have received Academy Award wins and nominations for their performances in their respective roles.

Year	Performer	Film	Result
Academy Award for Best Supporting Actor
1971	Jeff Bridges	The Last Picture Show	Nominated
1971	Ben Johnson	The Last Picture Show	Won
Academy Award for Best Supporting Actress
1971	Ellen Burstyn	The Last Picture Show	Nominated
1971	Cloris Leachman	The Last Picture Show	Won
1973	Madeline Kahn	Paper Moon	Nominated
1973	Tatum O'Neal	Paper Moon	Won

=== Honors ===
- Commander of the Order of Saint James of the Sword, Portugal (13 May 1999)
