= Dorothy Stratten =

Canadian Playmate and actress (1960–1980)

- Stratten in 1979
- Born: Dorothy Ruth Hoogstraten; February 28, 1960; Vancouver, British Columbia, Canada
- Died: August 14, 1980 (aged 20); Los Angeles, California, U.S.
- Cause of death: Murder (gunshot wound)
- Resting place: Westwood Village Memorial Park Cemetery
- Occupations: Model; actress
- Spouse: Paul Snider (m. 1979; sep. 1980)

Playboy centerfold appearance
- August 1979
- Preceded by: Dorothy Mays
- Succeeded by: Vicki McCarty

Playboy Playmate of the Year
- 1980
- Preceded by: Monique St. Pierre
- Succeeded by: Terri Welles

Dorothy Ruth Hoogstraten (February 28, 1960 – August 14, 1980), known professionally as Dorothy Stratten, was a Canadian model and actress, primarily known for her appearances as a Playboy Playmate. Stratten was selected as Playmate of the Month for August 1979 and was later named as 1980's Playmate of the Year, and appeared in three comedy films and in several episodes of television shows broadcast on American networks. Stratten was murdered shortly after co-starring in the movie They All Laughed, at the age of 20, by her estranged husband and manager Paul Snider, whom she was in the process of divorcing and breaking business ties with. Snider committed suicide immediately after murdering Stratten.

Stratten's death inspired two movies, a book, and several songs: the TV movie Death of a Centerfold: The Dorothy Stratten Story (1981), the theatrical motion picture Star 80 (1983), and the book The Killing of the Unicorn (1984).

== Life and career ==
Dorothy Stratten was born in Grace Maternity Hospital in Vancouver, British Columbia, Canada, on February 28, 1960, to Simon and Nelly Hoogstraten, who had emigrated from the Netherlands. In 1961, her brother John Arthur was born; her sister Louise followed in May 1968.

In 1977, Stratten was attending Centennial High School in Coquitlam. Centennial classmates remember Dorothy as "sweet and kind." One friend, Leslie Buchanan, recalls: "The crowd that Dorothy hung out with were party people. They weren't the sports crowd, just kind of a very cool group." Concurrently, she was working part-time at a local Dairy Queen, where she met 26-year-old Vancouver-area club promoter and pimp Paul Snider, who began dating her. Snider later had a photographer take professional nude photos of Stratten which were sent to Playboy magazine in the summer of 1978. She was under the age of 19 (the legal age of majority in British Columbia), so Snider forged her mother’s signature on the model release form.

In August 1978, Stratten moved to Los Angeles, California, United States, where she was chosen as a finalist for the 25th Anniversary Great Playmate Hunt. Snider joined her in October, and they married in June the following year. With her surname shortened from Hoogstraten to Stratten, she became Playboy's Miss August 1979 and began working as a bunny at the Playboy Club in Century City, Los Angeles. Hugh Hefner had high hopes that Stratten could have meaningful crossover success as an actress. She featured in episodes of the television series Buck Rogers and Fantasy Island in 1979. Also that year, she had small roles in the films Americathon, the roller disco comedy Skatetown, U.S.A., and a lead role in the exploitation film Autumn Born, all released in 1979.

Hefner was told by Playboy employees that Stratten should sever ties with Snider. In a documentary about Stratten, Hefner says that he tried to warn Stratten about Snider but that he was in a tough position. Rosanne Katon and other friends also warned Stratten about Snider's behavior.

=== March 1980 – July 1980 ===
On March 22, 1980, Stratten flew to New York City to begin work on what became her last film project, They All Laughed (1981), a romantic comedy being directed by Peter Bogdanovich. This would be Stratten's fifth movie in a career that had only begun the year before and represented her first substantial role in a big-budget picture, playing the unhappily-married love interest of John Ritter, one of the film's stars. (Note: Coincidentally, Ritter had played a lead role in Stratten's first movie, the comedy Americathon (1979), although the two had no scenes together.) Bogdanovich, who also wrote the screenplay, said in an interview that he had based the backstory of Stratten's character on what he had learned about her marriage to Snider. Stratten and Bogdanovich began an affair during the production.

Stratten had spent the first two and a half months of 1980 completing her Playmate of the Year shoot and making her previous movie, Galaxina, in southern California. With all her work close to home, Snider assumed the role of his wife's chauffeur, as well as her ersatz manager and acting coach. However, Snider's near-constant presence, as well as his criticism of and almost daily arguments with his wife, caused Stratten so much stress that her co-workers at Playboy and the Galaxina set took notice of the tension in the relationship. As the spring of 1980 approached, Snider insisted on accompanying his wife to New York for the shoot for They All Laughed, but Stratten recognized the problems he could cause on set and wanted the freedom to pursue her relationship with Bogdanovich. Stratten convinced Snider to remain in Los Angeles after explaining that the director had decided to close the set of his new film to all but the cast and immediate crew. Stratten and Bogdanovich consummated their affair on the day after her arrival in New York.

In April, Stratten briefly returned to California to prepare for her upcoming introduction as the new Playmate of the Year and follow-on publicity tour. With several months of filming left to be completed in New York, this was the last time that she would live with Snider in their Los Angeles–area home.

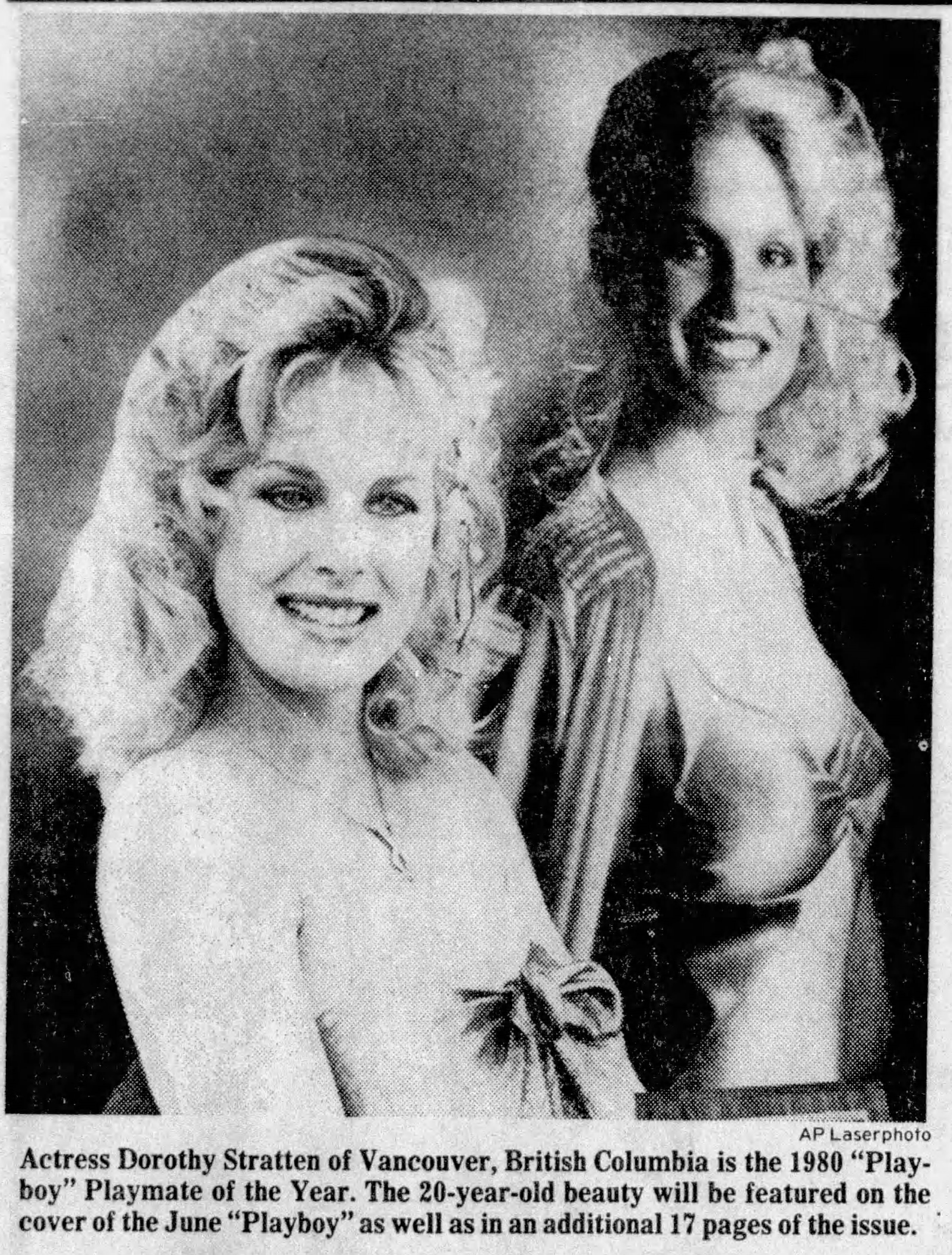
Newspaper clipping, April 30, 1980

On Wednesday, April 30, at a luncheon held on the grounds of the Playboy Mansion, Stratten was presented to the assembled entertainment press as the 1980 Playmate of the Year. In his introductory remarks, Hefner noted that Stratten was from Canada and had received $200,000 in cash and gifts in addition to the title. In a fleeting comment, he also acknowledged the effect that Stratten's charming combination of beauty, intelligence, and sensitivity had on many who knew her when he said, "...and she is something rather special. They always are, but Dorothy is really quite unique." After taking the lectern, Stratten thanked Mario Casilli, the photographer who shot both her Playmate of the Month and Year pictorials, several Playboy executives, and finally Hefner, whom she declared "has made me probably the happiest girl in the world today." Later that evening, Stratten appeared as a guest on NBC's The Tonight Show Starring Johnny Carson.

The next day, Stratten began a two-week promotional tour in Canada. Having no events scheduled over the first weekend, she flew to New York on a whim to surprise Bogdanovich. Increasingly conflicted about her marriage, Stratten wrote to Snider from Canada asking for more freedom in their relationship. With his wife beyond his immediate control and fearing the worst, Snider telephoned from Los Angeles in response and flew into a rage when Stratten answered. Stratten's tour was arranged to end in her hometown of Vancouver so Stratten might relax for a few days with family before returning to New York. However, Snider appeared in Vancouver at the last minute and coerced her into spending some of her brief vacation making personal appearances at several local nightclubs. Since Snider knew many of the club owners, he personally negotiated and collected Stratten's appearance fees and then pocketed the entire sum when she returned to New York. During this time, it was reported that Stratten and Snider had a particularly heated argument. At some point during the fight, Stratten offered to give up her acting career and suggested the couple permanently return to Canada; however, Snider rebuffed his wife's attempt to save their marriage.

In the days and weeks after Snider returned to Los Angeles, he found it increasingly difficult to get in touch with Stratten. In late June, just a few weeks after their first wedding anniversary, Snider received another letter from Stratten, this one announcing that they were now physically and financially separated. Snider had several responses to the second letter; he emptied the couple's joint bank account, he had a brief affair with an old girlfriend, and, now convinced that Stratten was having an affair of her own with Bogdanovich, hired a private detective to gather evidence of his wife's infidelity.

As a foreign national living in the U.S. without a green card that would allow him to hold a job and having no other source of regular income, Snider relied on Stratten, now through her business manager, to pay the monthly household bills. Little was left over for extravagances, such as the expenses incurred by a private detective working a case 3,000 miles from home. Therefore, over the summer of 1980, Snider began selling Stratten's Playmate of the Year prizes at a loss for quick cash, the most notable example being a Jaguar sportscar that Playboy had valued at $26,000.

By mid-July, principal photography on They All Laughed was completed and the New York production wrapped. On Wednesday, July 30, Stratten and Bogdanovich returned to Los Angeles after having spent a ten-day holiday together in England. Stratten's official Los Angeles residence was now at the address of a newly rented Beverly Hills apartment, but in actuality she had quietly moved into Bogdanovich's mansion in Bel Air.

=== August 1980 ===
On the night of July 31, 1980, Snider, by now aware that his estranged wife was back in Los Angeles and living with Bogdanovich, hid among the shadows just outside the director's estate carrying a borrowed handgun, intending to shoot anyone who appeared at the entrance to the property. After several hours of inactivity, Snider grew impatient and left, drove up into the hills overlooking the city and, he admitted later to a friend, had thoughts of suicide.

At approximately noon on Friday, August 8, Stratten and Snider saw each other for the first time in nearly three months at Snider's (and Stratten's former) house in West Los Angeles. After having already persuaded Stratten to pose for Playboy and then marry him, Snider was supremely confident before the meeting that he would convince his wife to take him back. But his hopes of a reconciliation were quickly dashed when Stratten admitted that she had fallen in love with Bogdanovich and wanted to finalize their separation. A dejected Snider agreed to meet Stratten one more time the following week to discuss a monetary settlement. Later that afternoon, less than a week before Stratten's murder, Snider had to return the borrowed gun to its owner. Over the next five days, he would become obsessed with getting another.

On August 9, the day after his meeting with Stratten, Snider and the private detective he had hired went to a local gun store. After being told that the store could not sell him a firearm because of his Canadian citizenship, Snider asked the private detective to buy the gun Snider wanted for him; the detective refused. When Snider saw the private detective again the following day, he tried to convince the man to buy him a machine gun for "home protection", but the detective talked him out of the idea. The next day, August 11, Snider drove out into the San Fernando Valley to look at a gun he had found for sale in a newspaper. He got lost, however, and eventually gave up and went home before finding the owner's address.

== Murder ==
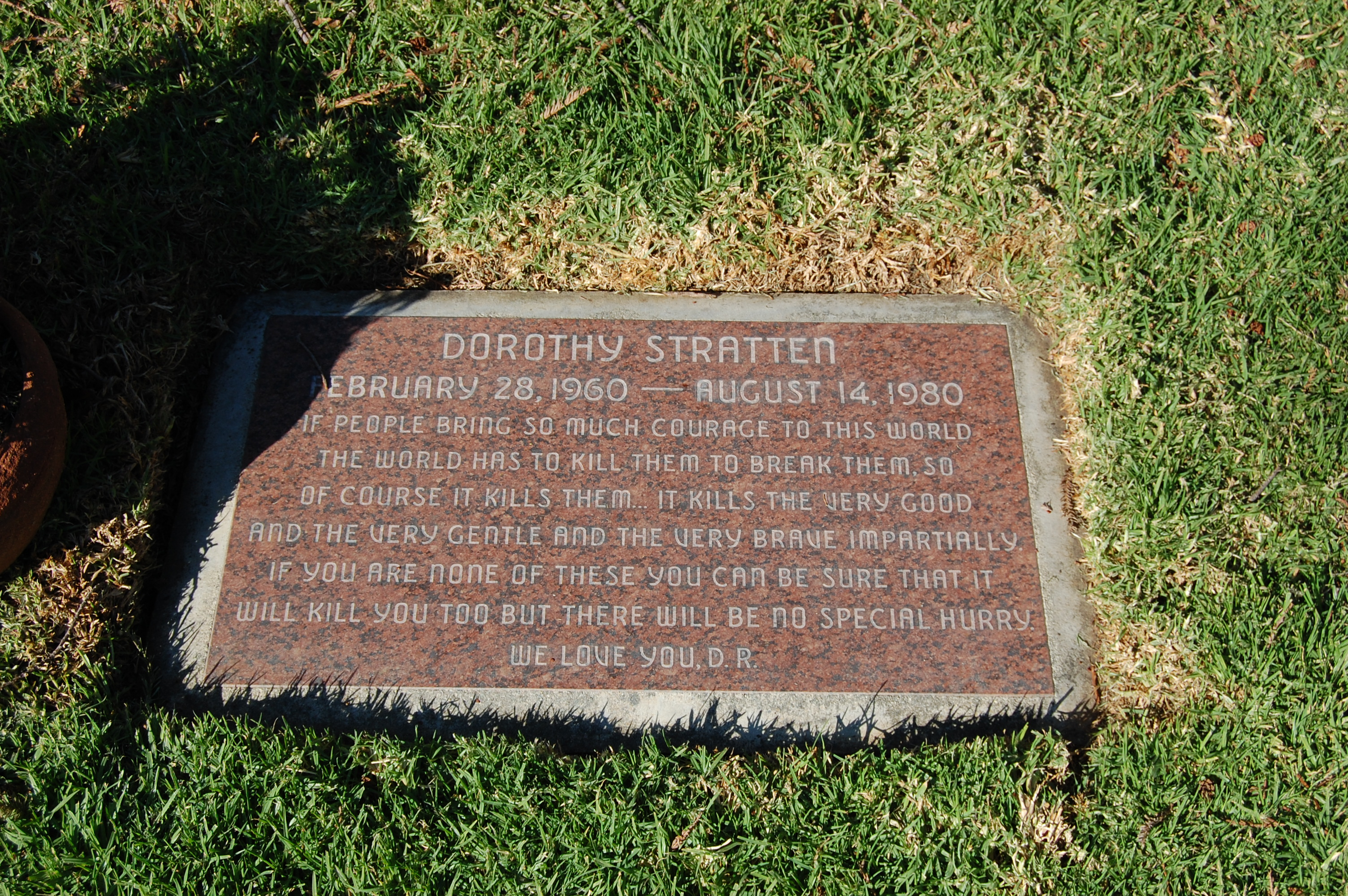
Dorothy Stratten's grave

On August 13, 1980 – the second anniversary of Stratten's first arrival in Los Angeles – Snider bought a used 12-gauge, pump-action shotgun from a private seller he found in a local classified ad. Later that evening in a conversation with friends, Snider described how he had purchased a gun that day and finished his story by declaring that he was "going to take up hunting." Snider casually brought up the subject of Playmates who had unexpectedly died; in particular, he spoke of Claudia Jennings, an actress and former Playmate of the Year who had been killed in a car accident the year before. Snider made several morbid remarks to his companions related to the problems at Playboy magazine caused by Jennings' death, including a comment about how the editors would pull nude photos of a dead Playmate from the next issue if there was time.

Stratten arrived for her meeting with Snider at his rented West Los Angeles house at approximately noon on Thursday, August 14. She had spent the morning conferring with her business manager, and one of the topics the pair discussed was the amount of the property settlement Stratten would offer her estranged husband that afternoon. The police later found $1,100 in cash among Stratten's belongings in the house, which she had apparently brought for Snider as a down payment. Towards the end of her morning meeting, Stratten's business manager made an observation: that his young client could avoid spending any more time with Snider by handing off the remaining separation and divorce negotiations to her lawyer. Stratten replied that the process would go easier if she dealt with Snider personally, explaining that he was being nice about everything and finally adding, "I'd like to remain his friend."

Snider's two roommates had left in the morning, so the couple was alone when Stratten stepped into the house that she had shared with her husband until just a few months earlier. By all appearances, Stratten had spent some time in the living room, where her purse was found lying open, before she and Snider went into his bedroom.

By 8:00 that evening, both of the roommates had returned to the house. They saw Stratten's car parked out front and noted that Snider's bedroom door was closed. Assuming that the couple had reconciled and wanted their privacy, the roommates spent the next several hours watching television in the living room.

Alerted by Snider's private detective who phoned expressing concern after not hearing from Snider all day, the roommates entered the bedroom shortly after 11:00 P.M. and discovered the bodies of Stratten and Snider. Each had been killed by a single blast from Snider's shotgun. Both bodies were nude. According to the police timeline and from the forensic evidence collected at the crime scene, Snider had shot Stratten that afternoon within an hour of her arrival at the house, then committed suicide approximately one hour after the murder.

Some time after midnight in the early morning of August 15, the private detective telephoned the Playboy Mansion and told Hefner that Stratten had been murdered. Hefner then called Bogdanovich. After collapsing at the news, Bogdanovich was sedated. Stratten's mother was told of her daughter's death at her Vancouver-area home later that morning by an officer of the Royal Canadian Mounted Police.

Stratten's body was cremated, and her remains were interred at the Westwood Village Memorial Park cemetery in Los Angeles. The epitaph on Stratten's grave marker includes a passage, chosen by Bogdanovich, from Chapter 34 of the Ernest Hemingway novel A Farewell to Arms. Three years after the murder, the author's granddaughter, Mariel Hemingway, played Stratten in Star 80, the Bob Fosse biopic about the doomed Playmate and her husband. Bogdanovich was interred next to her remains following his death in 2022.

== Filmography ==
=== Film ===
Year	Title	Role	Notes
1979	Americathon	Stage escort dressed as Playboy Bunny	uncredited, film debut
1979	Skatetown, U.S.A.	Girl at the snack bar	
1979	Autumn Born	Tara Dawson	
1980	Galaxina	Galaxina	
1981	They All Laughed	Dolores Martin	released posthumously

=== Television ===
Year	Title	Role	Notes
1979	Playboy's Roller-Disco & Pajama Party	Herself	
1979	Fantasy Island	Mickey	episode: "The Victim/The Mermaid"
1979	Buck Rogers in the 25th Century	Miss Cosmos	episode: "Cruise Ship to the Stars"
1980	The Tonight Show	herself	episode: "04/18/1980"

== Aftermath of Stratten's murder ==
=== Bogdanovich and They All Laughed ===
In August 1981, a year after Stratten's death, her final film, the romantic comedy They All Laughed, which was written and directed by Bogdanovich, had its U.S. release. After a disappointing limited run in a handful of theaters in the southwest, the upper midwest, and the northeast, the picture was quietly withdrawn.

Upset that what would be his only project with Stratten did not have a nationwide release, and determined that her last screen performance have a chance to be seen by a broader audience, Bogdanovich bought the theatrical rights to the picture. Out of his own pocket, he paid for a re-release of They All Laughed in nearly a dozen large markets across North America beginning in late 1981 and rolling into the following year. Despite generally favorable reviews and strong attendance in some theaters, Bogdanovich ultimately sank more than five million dollars, his entire net worth at the time, into the project to properly promote and distribute the movie and rescue Stratten's film legacy.

Bogdanovich declared bankruptcy in 1985. In the process, he lost his Los Angeles home where Stratten had lived for the last few weeks of her life.

In the years since its inauspicious debut, They All Laughed has been recognized by filmmakers, critics, and others as being one of Bogdanovich's best pictures. One Day Since Yesterday, a documentary about the making and cultural importance of Bogdanovich's romantic comedy, which includes interviews with the director and his remembrances of Stratten, premiered in 2014.

=== The Killing of the Unicorn ===
In August 1984, four years after Stratten's death, the publisher William Morrow released a book by Bogdanovich titled The Killing of the Unicorn: Dorothy Stratten 1960–1980.

The Killing of the Unicorn is, by turns, a biography of Stratten, a memoir of Bogdanovich's affair with the married Playmate who was half his age, and a scathing, feminist attack on Hefner, his Playboy philosophy, and the hedonistic sexual mores he celebrated in his magazine and practiced at his mansion, and the entire Playboy organization. By far the most controversial part of the book is the director's claim that Hefner had sexually assaulted a then eighteen-year-old Stratten in August 1978. According to Bogdanovich's allegation the assault occurred while the two were alone in a secluded area of the Playboy Mansion at the end of Stratten's first day of posing for the magazine's photographer. (Bogdanovich chose to use the word "seduced" to describe Hefner's behavior in the book; however, he originally used the word "raped" in the drafts of his manuscript. Bogdanovich and the publisher made the change after being threatened with a lawsuit by Hefner and his lawyers.)

Among the other allegations that Bogdanovich made in his book, the most significant are: 1) That Stratten had not married Snider out of love, but rather used her marriage as an excuse to block the advances of Hefner who, Bogdanovich claimed, pursued Stratten as a sexual partner after the purported assault, 2) That Stratten loathed nude modeling and dealing with Playboy in general, and only tolerated the humiliating work in order to promote her acting career, and 3) That Hefner was responsible, in part, for enabling Snider's killing rage when he was banned from entering the Playboy Mansion just days before the murder. Bogdanovich's underlying assertion for the last charge is that Snider was banned because Hefner hated the man. In his defense, Hefner explained that the purpose of the ban was to encourage Stratten and Bogdanovich to appear at the mansion as a couple.

Nearly every review of The Killing of the Unicorn in the U.S. press was negative. While few objected to Bogdanovich's attacks on Hefner and Playboy, many were skeptical of his newfound feminism, pointing out, for example, that he "seemed oblivious to his own sexist susceptibility to 'the whore/Madonna complex' in his view of women." The review that appeared in the Chicago Tribune, for instance, had its tone concisely summarized in the blunt headline that led off the piece, "Shabby little shocker." Film critic Roger Ebert, writing for the crosstown Chicago Sun-Times, managed to express empathy for Bogdanovich and the tragedy of Stratten's death, but was no less critical, stating that he could understand why Bogdanovich felt the need to write the book, "but I wish he hadn't published it."

In an article that appeared shortly after the murder, Hefner, who was 33 years older than Stratten, used the word "friendship" to describe his relationship with her and was said to see himself as a "father figure" to the Playmate. The image that Hefner presented to the public as a supportive, benevolent, paternal figure to Stratten was emphasized the following spring when Playboy published her biography in its May 1981 issue. It was reported that Hefner had personally supervised the editing of the article.

In 1985, when asked again about his relationship with Stratten after the release of The Killing of the Unicorn, Hefner did concede to a crucial detail that lay at the heart of Bogdanovich's allegation. Namely, Hefner admitted that several weeks after Stratten first arrived in Los Angeles, the two had taken a nude soak in the Jacuzzi on the Playboy Mansion grounds, the place where Bogdanovich claimed the sexual assault had occurred. In the same interview, while allowing that they had "hugged" in the Jacuzzi, Hefner denied having forced himself on Stratten. Hefner also denied, despite his reputation, that he had ever so much as made a pass at her, suggesting that his sexual interest in Stratten had ended in the Jacuzzi after learning that she expected to become engaged to her boyfriend. (This conversation would have occurred approximately two months before Hefner first met Snider.)

In 2022, Stefan Tetenbaum, Hefner's valet between 1978 and 1981, alleged on the A&E documentary series Secrets of Playboy that he and a security guard had witnessed Hefner raping Stratten in the mansion grotto before the guard told Tetenbaum to keep quiet on the incident.

== Legacy ==
Stratten's murder was depicted in two films. In the made-for-television Death of a Centerfold: The Dorothy Stratten Story (1981), Jamie Lee Curtis portrayed Stratten and Bruce Weitz played Paul Snider. Bob Fosse's feature film Star 80 (1983) starred Mariel Hemingway as Stratten and Eric Roberts as Snider.

In 1983, film critic Vincent Canby wrote "Miss Stratten possessed a charming screen presence and might possibly have become a first-rate comedienne with time and work".

In December 1988, at age 49, Bogdanovich married Stratten's sister, Louise, who was 20. Bogdanovich had paid for Louise's private schooling and modeling classes following Stratten's death. They divorced in 2001 after being married for 13 years.

Singer-songwriter Bryan Adams, along with co-writer Jim Valance, wrote the song "The Best Was Yet to Come" as the closing track for Adams' 1983 LP Cuts Like a Knife as a dedication to Dorothy Stratten. Adams also co-wrote with Lindsay Mitchell of the Canadian band Prism the track "Cover Girl" for their greatest hits collection All the Best From Prism (1980), which had not appeared on any prior album.

Bush's song "Dead Meat" is written in her memory. "Californication" by the Red Hot Chili Peppers makes reference to her.

Actress Nicola Peltz portrays Stratten in the 2022 Hulu miniseries Welcome to Chippendales.

== See also ==
- List of people in Playboy 1970–1979
- List of people in Playboy 1980–1989

== Notes ==
Candy Loving	Lee Ann Michelle	Denise McConnell	Missy Cleveland	Michele Drake	Louann Fernald
Dorothy Mays	Dorothy Stratten	Vicki McCarty	Ursula Buchfellner	Sylvie Garant	Candace Collins
