= Star 80 =

1983 film by Bob Fosse

- Theatrical release poster
- Directed by: Bob Fosse
- Written by: Bob Fosse
- Based on: "Death of a Playmate" by Teresa Carpenter
- Produced by: Wolfgang Glattes; Kenneth Utt
- Starring: Mariel Hemingway; Eric Roberts; Cliff Robertson; Carroll Baker; Roger Rees; David Clennon
- Cinematography: Sven Nykvist
- Edited by: Alan Heim
- Music by: Ralph Burns
- Production company: The Ladd Company
- Distributed by: Warner Bros.
- Release date: November 10, 1983
- Running time: 103 minutes
- Country: United States
- Language: English
- Box office: $6.4 million

Star 80 is a 1983 American biographical crime drama film written and directed by Bob Fosse, and starring Mariel Hemingway, Eric Roberts, Cliff Robertson, Carroll Baker, Roger Rees, and David Clennon. It was adapted from the Pulitzer Prize-winning Village Voice article "Death of a Playmate" by Teresa Carpenter, about Canadian Playboy model Dorothy Stratten, who died in a murder–suicide committed by her husband, Paul Snider, in 1980. The film chronicles Stratten's relationship with Snider, their move to Los Angeles, her success as a Playboy model, the dissolution of their relationship, and her murder. Its title is taken from one of Snider's vanity license plates.

Star 80 was filmed on location in Vancouver and Los Angeles; the death scene was filmed in the same house in which the real murder–suicide took place. Warner Bros. released Star 80 in the United States on November 10, 1983. It received mixed reviews from critics, with Roberts' and Hemingway's performances receiving some acclaim, though numerous critics found the film exploitative and criticized its graphic violence. The film marked Fosse's final directorial feature before his death in 1987.

In the years since its original release, Star 80 has received a favorable critical reappraisal. American screenwriter Josh Olson cites it as "one of the most unpleasant films to ever come out of Hollywood."

== Plot ==
Dorothy Stratten lies dead as her husband Paul Snider rants to himself about the events that led up to the present moment. The story, told through a series of flashbacks, has a linear narrative but is interspersed by Paul's rants as well as by documentary-style interviews with some of the characters.

Paul, a brash small-time con artist and pimp, first meets 17-year-old Dorothy two years earlier while she works at a Dairy Queen in her native Vancouver, British Columbia. He woos Dorothy with attention and flattery and a romance develops, much to the displeasure of her mother. Working under the delusion that he is Dorothy's only path to realization, Paul attempts to run her life, uncovering a possessive streak in the process, and insists on being her personal manager. He convinces her to pose nude in Polaroid photographs until she sheds her initial timidity, then hires two professional photographers to take pictures of her.

These pictures make their way to Playboy magazine founder and publisher Hugh Hefner who invites Dorothy to Los Angeles for a photo shoot. When Dorothy's mother refuses to sign the parental consent form, Paul forges her signature. Hefner makes Dorothy Playmate of the Month for the August 1979 issue, provides lodging for her and gives her a job as a Bunny at the local Playboy Club.

Despite his constant infidelities, Paul is plagued by jealousy and feelings of inadequacy. He proposes marriage to Dorothy over the phone, flies to Los Angeles and alienates everyone in the Playboy Mansion with his uncouth and nervously sycophantic demeanor. Against the advice of Hefner and his associates, however, Dorothy proceeds with the marriage. They share a rented house in Rancho Park with another couple and enjoy a large social entourage, but Dorothy becomes increasingly disenchanted by Paul's possessiveness and tacky sleaze.

Dorothy is named 1980's Playmate of the Year and starts an acting career thanks to Hefner's contacts. Paul, on the other hand, feels deeply insecure after losing money on failed business ventures and being eclipsed by his wife's success. Still adamant to remain influential on her life, Paul pesters her with constant phone calls that interrupt her filming sessions, and becomes a fixture at the Playboy Mansion despite lacking a formal invitation from Hefner. He also uses Dorothy's money to purchase a Mercedes with a vanity license plate that reads "Star 80".

Famous film director Aram Nicholas first discovers Dorothy among the skaters at a Playboy Mansion roller disco party. At Hefner's recommendation, he casts her in his next picture, to be filmed in New York City. Paul appears to welcome this development, but his jealousy escalates and he hires a private detective to follow Dorothy in New York. The realization that the Playboy Mansion's doors are now closed for him compounds Paul's erratic obsession, unnerving his housemates in the process.

Noticing Dorothy's unhappiness with the marriage, Aram convinces her to leave Paul and they begin an affair. The private detective discovers this and advises Paul to sue Aram for enticement, in effect conflating the marriage with Paul's purported "management" of Dorothy even though the latter was only a verbal contract.

Broke, dejected and increasingly volatile, Paul correctly surmises Aram's influence on Dorothy's shift in decisions and mannerisms, but fails to accept that his marriage is effectively over. Upon her return to Los Angeles, Dorothy admits the affair, but promises Paul financial support. She agrees to meet Paul personally again to discuss divorce proceedings, despite Aram's advice to use an intermediary. Paul subsequently purchases a shotgun.

Dorothy and Paul meet at the Rancho Park house. Despite his pleas, she declares that their marriage and business ties are over, offers him half of her savings and tries to console him. Paul perceives her attitude as condescending and becomes enraged. A chaotic and reproachful interaction ensues, which culminates in Paul raping Dorothy, shooting her in the head with the shotgun and violating her corpse on a sex contraption of his own design. Paul then turns the gun on himself, and ominously proclaims his future fame before pulling the trigger.

== Cast ==
- Mariel Hemingway as Dorothy Stratten
- Eric Roberts as Paul Snider
- Cliff Robertson as Hugh Hefner
- Carroll Baker as Dorothy's mother (Note: Unnamed in the film, based on Nelly Hoogstraten.)
- Roger Rees as Aram Nicholas (Note: Based on Peter Bogdanovich.)
- David Clennon as Martin "Geb" Geber (Note: Based on Dr. Stephen Cushner.)
- Josh Mostel as private detective
- Lisa Gordon as Eileen, Dorothy's sister (Note: Based on Louise Hoogstraten.)
- Sidney Miller as Harlan
- Keith Hefner as photographer
- Tina Willson as Bobo Weller (Note: Based on Terri Welles.)
- Shelly Ingram as Betty
- Cis Rundle as Meg Davis
- Kathryn Witt as Robin, Marvin's girlfriend (Note: Based on Patti Laurman.)
- Jordan Christopher as Peter Rose
- James Luisi as Roy
- Neva Patterson as Playboy executive
- Keenen Ivory Wayans as club comedian
- Stuart Damon as Vince Roberts
- Ernest Thompson as Phil Wass
- Budd Friedman as emcee
- Deborah Geffner as Billie
- Terence Kelly as Charlie
- Dean Hajum as Dorothy's brother George (Note: Based on John Arthur Hoogstraten.)
- Stanley Kamel as Nick
- Liz Sheridan as makeup woman
- Robert Picardo as interviewer
- Gwen Welles as Leann (uncredited)

== Production ==
=== Development ===
The idea for the project began when Bob Fosse's friend Paddy Chayefsky recommended a Pulitzer Prize-winning article about Stratten written by Teresa Carpenter that had appeared in The Village Voice. In May 1981, it was announced that Fosse was developing a screenplay, originally titled The Dorothy Stratten Story. Fosse wrote the screenplay in a nonlinear narrative fashion, employing flashbacks and flashforwards, which he felt helped dramatize the series of events. The film was dedicated to Chayefsky who died shortly after Fosse announced the film.

Director Peter Bogdanovich, Stratten's boyfriend at the time of her murder, expressed opposition to the project, arguing that Fosse "didn't know the true story." Fosse acknowledged this statement to be true but countered that the film was about Snider. Bogdanovich refused to allow his name to be used in the film and threatened to sue if he found the character of Aram Nicholas to be objectionable. He provided his opinions of the film in his 1984 biography of Stratten, The Killing of the Unicorn: Dorothy Stratten, 1960–1980, criticizing the final film's depiction of Stratten as well as her murder, but he did not pursue legal action.

Star 80 is the second film based on the murder of Stratten, preceded by the 1981 television film Death of a Centerfold: The Dorothy Stratten Story, with Jamie Lee Curtis as Stratten and Bruce Weitz as Snider.

=== Casting ===
Mariel Hemingway believed she was ideal for the part and campaigned for it vigorously with letters, telephone messages and visits to Fosse's home. She eventually won the role after four auditions, and her casting was announced in March 1982. Some in the media reported that Hemingway had undergone breast augmentation surgery to secure the part. In the 2020 documentary Skin: A History of Nudity in the Movies, Hemingway admits she underwent a breast-enlargement procedure before being cast, but says, "I did it for me. I wouldn't have done that because of a movie." Nude photographs of Hemingway posing as Stratten appeared in the January 1984 issue of Playboy magazine.

According to Fosse, he had to persuade Eric Roberts to play the role of Paul Snider, a character whom Roberts considered unlikeable. Roberts recalled: "It didn’t grab me right away. It felt very black and white. But it said ‘Bob Fosse’ on it, and that was enough." After a series of auditions, Roberts was officially offered the role. In order to help prepare Roberts for the role, Fosse spent approximately three months walking Roberts through various real-life locations connected to the story, including the Vancouver Dairy Queen where Snider first met Stratten, her childhood home, and the Playboy Mansion.

Early media speculation suggested that Harry Dean Stanton might be cast as Playboy publisher Hugh Hefner, but Cliff Robertson was reported to be researching the role by visiting the Playboy Mansion. The film marked Carroll Baker's first Hollywood production since her 1967 return from Europe. In accordance with the Stratten family's wishes, Stratten's mother is never mentioned by name in the film, and the names of her sister and brother were changed.

=== Pre-production ===
Pre-production began in Stratten's hometown of Vancouver in January 1982, followed by rehearsals held in a church on Highland Avenue in Los Angeles. Roberts described Fosse's approach as meticulous: "He knew exactly what he was going to shoot. Every move, every piece of furniture, everything." Hemingway recalled that the rehearsals lasted approximately six weeks.

Fosse made extensive scouting trips to Vancouver in a fifteen-passenger van large enough to house the head of each department, including cinematography Sven Nykvist.

=== Filming ===
Principal photography began on July 6, 1982, in Vancouver and continued for four months, including four weeks in Vancouver and 12 weeks in Los Angeles. The film features numerous locations connected to Stratton's early life, including the Dairy Queen where she was employed, a strip club frequented by Snider, the Blue Horizon Hotel, and the Pacific National Exhibition fairgrounds. Some interior sequences were filmed at Panorama Studios in West Vancouver.

After Hefner refused to allow filming at his Los Angeles estate, an unoccupied mansion in Pasadena was renovated to resemble Hefner's mansion. The film's party scenes show actual Playboy models. Additional studio filming occurred at Zoetrope Studios in Hollywood. According to biographer Sam Wasson, Fosse's intense obsession with detail left him "a bottomless wound of insatiability" and full of "debilitating dread" throughout the shoot.

Filming of the murder–suicide scene took place on location inside the actual apartment where the crime occurred. According to Roberts, the night before he was scheduled to film the scene, Fosse had him spend the night in the apartment: "I didn’t want to go," said Roberts. "I told him, ‘I don’t want it.’ And he said, ‘No, you’re going to spend the night with it. Come on.'That was Bob. He wanted you to feel what it was." Roberts was encouraged by Fosse to remain in character on set.

Filming was completed by November 1982, three days ahead of schedule.

== Release ==
The film opened in 16 theaters in major U.S. cities on November 10, 1983. Warner Bros. Pictures planned to release the film to more theaters for the Christmas season and to give it a wide release in time for the next Academy Awards ceremony. The film's release expanded to a peak of 502 theaters in early 1984.

The film was screened out of competition at the 34th Berlin International Film Festival, where Fosse was nominated for the Golden Bear award .

=== Home media ===
Warner Home Video released Star 80 on VHS in 1984. A DVD edition was released by Warner Home Entertainment in 1998. The Warner Archive Collection reissued the film on DVD on February 24, 2015.

== Reception ==
=== Box office ===
Star 80 grossed $233,313 during its opening weekend. Eventually, the film grossed $6,472,990 in the United States.

=== Critical response ===
Critical reception to Star 80 was mixed, with some critics accusing the film of glorifying violence, exploiting Stratten's murder, and portraying Snider in a "sympathetic" manner. According Fosse biographer Sam Wasson, "Even the hippest crowds in New York fled the theater in abject speechlessness." On the review aggregator website Rotten Tomatoes, 81% of 16 critics' reviews are positive, with an average rating of 7.4/10. Metacritic, which uses a weighted average, assigned the film a score of 63 out of 100, based on 13 critics, indicating "generally favorable" reviews.

Gary Arnold of The Washington Post noted that the film has "some genuine stylistic luster, but it lacks sufficient dramatic justification for indulging a morbid interest in a dreadful case history." Sheila Benson of the Los Angeles Times felt that the film's screenplay focused too heavily on Snider, who "becomes someone you watch with horrified fascination," concluding that the film "doesn't rise enough beyond its tragic subject to draw conclusions that are there to be had. It substitutes irony for insight. But what may be the greatest irony is that to get the role of a girl whose life ended among desperate people obsessed with surface and image, Mariel Hemingway underwent breast augmentation to play the role of Dorothy Stratten." David Elliott of USA Today similarly described the film as a "biopsy of sleaze," summarizing: "As Star 80 turns to bloody sludge, it doesn't offer insight, or even prompt much pity. We just want to take a bath."

Pauline Kael was repulsed by the film, describing it as being "about the degradation of everything and everybody" and a work "nauseated by itself." Marjorie Baumgarten of The Austin Chronicle panned the film, writing: "The movie is so unpleasant that it even dashes all hope for achieving the status of a wonderfully trashy movie that can be enjoyed despite one’s better instincts... Stratten’s death and the violation of her corpse becomes a tragedy of lost promise that one suspects would be considered less tragic if she were an anonymous and average-looking murdered wife."

Gene Siskel of the Chicago Tribune placed the film on his list of the 10 best films of 1983, but acknowledged that the film was very unpleasant. Chicago Sun-Times critic Roger Ebert awarded the film four out of four stars and deemed it an "important movie," adding: "Dorothy’s triumphs are all stained with our knowledge of what will happen. Every time she smiles, it’s poignant. We know Paul will go berserk and kill her, and so we can see from the beginning that he’s unbalanced. Fosse knows his material is relentlessly depressing, and so he doesn’t try for moments of relief." Appearing with Siskel on an October 1986 edition of The Late Show Starring Joan Rivers, Ebert said that Roberts should have been nominated for an Academy Award for his work on Star 80. Ebert coined the phrase "Star 80 syndrome" after claiming that Gary Oldman's performance as Sid Vicious in Sid and Nancy (1986) was snubbed for the same reason as was Roberts': "Hollywood will not nominate an actor for portraying a creep, no matter how good the performance is." Joseph Gelmis of Newsday awarded the film a three out of four star-rating, calling it a "handsome production" and "squalid variation on the Cinderella story," though he cited Roberts's performance as a "chief weakness... [the film] lacks a performance by a player to match Fosse's virtuoso performance as a director."

=== Modern appraisal ===
In the years since its initial release, critical appraisal of Star 80 has become more favorable. Owen Gleiberman cites it as "the greatest modern American film that has never truly been recognized," adding that "what raised the critics’ ire was precisely what made the film visionary."

Screenwriter Josh Olson, writing for Trailers from Hell, described it as "one of the most unpleasant films to ever come out of Hollywood... made even more unbearable by the heartbreakingly sweet presence of Mariel Hemingway," adding that Fosse "directs in a cold-blooded style suitable for a horror film."

Filmmakers Quentin Tarantino and Roger Avary devoted an episode of their podcast, The Video Archives Podcast, to Star 80, with both singling out Eric Roberts's performance and calling its failure to receive an Academy Award nomination as one of the greatest snubs of the 80s.

Filmmaker and Austin Film Society founder Richard Linklater is also a noted fan and, while introducing it at a 35mm screening of it in 2014, praised Bob Fosse for "capturing a living Hell" in the film.

=== Accolades ===
Award/association	Year	Category	Recipient(s)	Result	Ref.
Berlin International Film Festival	1984	Golden Bear	Bob Fosse	Nominated	
Boston Society of Film Critics Awards	1984	Best Actor	Eric Roberts	Won	
Golden Globe Awards	1984	Best Actor in a Motion Picture – Drama	Eric Roberts	Nominated	
New York Film Critics Circle Awards	1984	Best Actor	Eric Roberts	3rd Place	

== See also ==
- Death of a Centerfold, a 1981 television film starring Jamie Lee Curtis

== Sources ==
- Bogdanovich, Peter (1984). The Killing of the Unicorn: Dorothy Stratten (1960–1980). New York City, New York: William Morrow and Company. ISBN 978-0-688-01611-1.
- Epting, Chris (2003). James Dean Died Here: The Locations of America's Pop Culture Landmarks. Santa Monica, California: Santa Monica Press. ISBN 978-1-891-66131-0.
