= Death of a Centerfold =

1981 television film by Gabrielle Beaumont

- DVD cover
- Also known as: Death of a Centerfold: The Dorothy Stratten Story
- Genre: Biography; Drama
- Written by: Donald E. Stewart
- Directed by: Gabrielle Beaumont
- Starring: Jamie Lee Curtis; Bruce Weitz; Robert Reed
- Theme music composer: Roger Webb
- Country of origin: United States
- Original language: English

Production
- Executive producer: Larry Wilcox
- Producers: Paul Pompian; Tim King
- Cinematography: Emil Oster
- Editor: Morton Tubor
- Running time: 96 minutes
- Production companies: Wilcox Productions; MGM Television

Original release
- Network: NBC
- Release: November 1, 1981

Death of a Centerfold: The Dorothy Stratten Story is a 1981 American biographical drama television film, optioned by Larry Wilcox and his company Wilcox Productions. Wilcox signed the paperwork at midnight and beat out Hugh Hefner and Metro-Goldwyn-Mayer. Later, Wilcox developed the story and pitched it to MGM, where he had a production development deal and subsequently to NBC. MGM and Wilcox then hired director Gabrielle Beaumont. It is a dramatization of the life and the murder of Playboy Playmate of the Year Dorothy Stratten, played by Jamie Lee Curtis. The film aired on November 1, 1981. Two years later, the same story was developed by director Bob Fosse in his film Star 80, starring Mariel Hemingway and Eric Roberts.

== Plot ==
The film depicts the life and times of model, actress, and 1980 Playboy Playmate of the year Dorothy Stratten, who was killed at age 20 in a murder–suicide committed by her estranged husband Paul Snider.

== Cast ==
- Jamie Lee Curtis as Dorothy Stratten
- Bruce Weitz as Paul Snider
- Robert Reed as David Palmer
- Mitchell Ryan as Hugh Hefner
- Bibi Besch as Hilda Flushing
- Tracy Reed as Mindy
- Gloria Gifford as Jean
- Hugh Gillin as Max Halloran
- Luca Bercovici as "Pooch"
- Kale Browne as Sidney
- Mark Withers as Billy Compton
- Robert Clotworthy as Floyd

== Production ==
The TV production was optioned and owned by Larry Wilcox of CHiPs fame, and he negotiated a deal with MGM and NBC for the story to become a movie of the week. At the family's insistence, the names and relationships of her mother and sister were altered.

== Reception ==
The New York Times critic John J. O'Connor praised the film, writing: "the movie works remarkably well in building a dramatic momentum. Jamie Lee Curtis's Dorothy is a thoroughly understandable, if not sympathetic figure. And Bruce Weitz is extraordinary". People magazine also praised the film, writing: "Jamie Lee Curtis is just right as Stratten, and Bruce Weitz is a standout as her ex". Film critic Leonard Maltin described the film as "exploitative".

Death of a Centerfold: The Dorothy Stratten Story finished 27th in the Nielsen ratings. When the film was broadcast a second time on NBC in July 1983, it fared better by finishing fourth in the ratings.

== Home media ==
The film was first issued on VHS on September 1, 1998. It was later released on January 25, 2010, on DVD.

== See also ==
- Star 80 (1983), starring Mariel Hemingway
