= List of film director and actor collaborations =

Some film directors and actors have collaborated numerous times and have become noteworthy for their partnerships. Note: In some instances, the body of work is too extensive to list all the films on which they worked together.

The list is in alphabetical order by the last name of the director.

== List of director pages having tables of frequent collaborators ==
- Woody Allen
- Pedro Almodóvar
- Robert Altman
- Wes Anderson
- Paul Thomas Anderson
- Peter Bogdanovich
- Tim Burton
- John Carpenter
- Coen brothers
- Guillermo del Toro
- David Fincher
- Mike Flanagan
- John Ford
- Luca Guadagnino
- Christopher Guest
- James Gunn
- Rian Johnson
- Yorgos Lanthimos
- David Lean
- Mike Leigh
- David Lynch
- Shane Meadows
- David Michôd
- Ryan Murphy
- Christopher Nolan
- Powell and Pressburger
- Russo brothers
- Preston Sturges
- Quentin Tarantino
- Matthew Vaughn
- Denis Villeneuve
- The Wachowskis
- Joss Whedon

== List of collaborations (A-C) ==
Director	Actor	Films	Ref.
J. J. Abrams	Simon Pegg	Mission: Impossible III (2006), Star Trek (2009), Star Trek Into Darkness (2013), Star Wars: The Force Awakens (2015)	
Ben Affleck	Titus Welliver	Gone Baby Gone (2007), The Town (2010), Argo (2012), Live by Night (2016)	
Woody Allen	Diane Keaton	Men of Crisis: The Harvey Wallinger Story (1971, short), Sleeper (1973), Love and Death (1975), Annie Hall (1977), Interiors (1978), Manhattan (1979), Radio Days (1987), Manhattan Murder Mystery (1993)	
Pedro Almodóvar	Antonio Banderas	Labyrinth of Passion (1982), Matador (1986), Law of Desire (1987), Women on the Verge of a Nervous Breakdown (1988), Tie Me Up! Tie Me Down! (1990), The Skin I Live In (2011), I'm So Excited (2013), Pain and Glory (2019)	
Pedro Almodóvar	Penélope Cruz	Live Flesh (1997), All About My Mother (1999), Volver (2006), Broken Embraces (2009), I'm So Excited (2013), Pain and Glory (2019), Parallel Mothers (2021)	
Robert Altman	David Arkin	MASH (1970), The Long Goodbye (1973), Nashville (1975), Popeye (1980)	
Robert Altman	René Auberjonois	Brewster McCloud (1970), MASH (1970), McCabe & Mrs. Miller (1971), Images (1972), The Player (1992)	
Robert Altman	Karen Black	Nashville (1975), Come Back to the 5 & Dime, Jimmy Dean, Jimmy Dean (1982), The Player (1992, cameo as herself)	
Robert Altman	Carol Burnett	A Wedding (1978), Health (1980), The Laundromat (1985, TV)	
Robert Altman	Keith Carradine	McCabe & Mrs. Miller (1971), Thieves Like Us (1974), Nashville (1975)	
Robert Altman	Geraldine Chaplin	Nashville (1975), Buffalo Bill and the Indians, or Sitting Bull's History Lesson (1976), A Wedding (1978)	
Robert Altman	Paul Dooley	A Wedding (1978), A Perfect Couple (1979), Health (1980), Popeye (1980), O.C. and Stiggs (1985), The Player (1992, cameo as himself)	
Robert Altman	Robert Duvall	Countdown (1967), MASH (1970), The Gingerbread Man (1998)	
Robert Altman	Shelley Duvall	Brewster McCloud (1970), McCabe & Mrs. Miller (1971), Thieves Like Us (1974), Nashville (1975), Buffalo Bill and the Indians, or Sitting Bull's History Lesson (1976), 3 Women (1977), Popeye (1980)	
Robert Altman	Corey Fischer	MASH (1970), Brewster McCloud (1970), McCabe & Mrs. Miller (1971)	
Robert Altman	Henry Gibson	The Long Goodbye (1973), Nashville (1975), A Perfect Couple (1979), Health (1980)	
Robert Altman	Jeff Goldblum	California Split (1974), Nashville (1975), Beyond Therapy (1987), The Player (1992, cameo as himself)	
Robert Altman	Elliott Gould	MASH (1970), The Long Goodbye (1973), California Split (1974), Nashville (1975, cameo as himself), The Player (1992, cameo as himself)	
Robert Altman	Richard E. Grant	The Player (1992), Prêt-à-Porter (1994), Gosford Park (2001)	
Robert Altman	Sally Kellerman	MASH (1970), Brewster McCloud (1970), Prêt-à-Porter (1994)	
Robert Altman	Lyle Lovett	The Player (1992), Short Cuts (1993), Prêt-à-Porter (1994), Cookie's Fortune (1999)	
Robert Altman	Belita Moreno	3 Women (1977), A Wedding (1978), A Perfect Couple (1979)	
Robert Altman	Michael Murphy	Countdown (1967), That Cold Day in the Park (1969), MASH (1970), Brewster McCloud (1970), McCabe & Mrs. Miller (1971), Nashville (1975), Tanner '88 (1988, TV), Tanner on Tanner (2004, TV)	
Robert Altman	Craig Richard Nelson	3 Women (1977), A Wedding (1978), Quintet (1979)	
Robert Altman	Bert Remsen	Brewster McCloud (1970), McCabe & Mrs. Miller (1971), Thieves Like Us (1974), California Split (1974), Nashville (1975), Buffalo Bill and the Indians, or Sitting Bull's History Lesson (1976), A Wedding (1978)	
Robert Altman	Tim Robbins	The Player (1992), Short Cuts (1993), Prêt-à-Porter (1994)	
Robert Altman	John Schuck	MASH (1970), Brewster McCloud (1970), McCabe & Mrs. Miller (1971), Thieves Like Us (1974)	
Robert Altman	Lily Tomlin	Nashville (1975), The Player (1992), Short Cuts (1993), A Prairie Home Companion (2006)	
Paul Thomas Anderson	Philip Seymour Hoffman	Hard Eight (1996), Boogie Nights (1997), Magnolia (1999), Punch-Drunk Love (2002), The Master (2012)	
Paul W. S. Anderson	Milla Jovovich	Resident Evil (2002), Resident Evil: Afterlife (2010), The Three Musketeers (2011), Resident Evil: Retribution (2012), Resident Evil: The Final Chapter (2016), Monster Hunter (2020), In the Lost Lands (2025)	
Wes Anderson	Bill Murray	10 different films from 1998 to 2025.	
Wes Anderson	Luke Wilson	Bottle Rocket (1996), Rushmore (1998), The Royal Tenenbaums (2001)	
Wes Anderson	Owen Wilson	Bottle Rocket (1996), Rushmore (1998), The Royal Tenenbaums (2001), The Life Aquatic with Steve Zissou (2004), The Darjeeling Limited (2007), Fantastic Mr. Fox (2009), The Grand Budapest Hotel (2014), The French Dispatch (2021)	
Wes Anderson	Stephen Park	The French Dispatch (2021), Asteroid City (2023), The Phoenician Scheme (2025)	
Wes Anderson	Jeffrey Wright	The French Dispatch (2021), Asteroid City (2023), The Phoenician Scheme (2025)	
Wes Anderson	Willem Dafoe	The Life Aquatic with Steve Zissou (2004), Fantastic Mr. Fox (2009), The Grand Budapest Hotel (2014), The French Dispatch (2021), Asteroid City (2023), The Phoenician Scheme (2025)	
Wes Anderson	Larry Pine	The Royal Tenenbaums (2001), The Darjeeling Limited (2007), Fantastic Mr. Fox (2009), The Grand Budapest Hotel (2014), The French Dispatch (2021)	
Wes Anderson	Wallace Wolodarsky	The Royal Tenenbaums (2001), The Darjeeling Limited (2007), Fantastic Mr. Fox (2009), The Grand Budapest Hotel (2014), The French Dispatch (2021)	
Wes Anderson	Edward Norton	Moonrise Kingdom (2012), The Grand Budapest Hotel (2014), Isle of Dogs (2018), The French Dispatch (2021), Asteroid City (2023)	
Wes Anderson	Fisher Stevens	Moonrise Kingdom (2012), The Grand Budapest Hotel (2014), Isle of Dogs (2018), The French Dispatch (2021), Asteroid City (2023)	
Wes Anderson	Tilda Swinton	Moonrise Kingdom (2012), The Grand Budapest Hotel (2014), Isle of Dogs (2018), The French Dispatch (2021), Asteroid City (2023)	
Michelangelo Antonioni	Monica Vitti	Il Grido (1957), L'Avventura (1960), La Notte (1961), L'Eclisse (1962), Red Desert (1964), The Mystery of Oberwald (1980)	
Judd Apatow	Iris Apatow	Knocked Up (2007), Funny People (2009), This Is 40 (2012), The Bubble (2022)	
Judd Apatow	Maude Apatow	The 40-Year-Old Virgin (2005, scene deleted), Knocked Up (2007), Funny People (2009), This Is 40 (2012), The King of Staten Island (2020)	
Judd Apatow	Bill Hader	Knocked Up (2007), This Is 40 (2012), Trainwreck (2015)	
Judd Apatow	Jonah Hill	The 40-Year-Old Virgin (2005), Knocked Up (2007), Funny People (2009)	
Judd Apatow	Seth Rogen	Freaks and Geeks (1999-2000), The 40-Year-Old Virgin (2005), Knocked Up (2007), Funny People (2009)	
Judd Apatow	Leslie Mann	The 40-Year-Old Virgin (2005), Knocked Up (2007), Funny People (2009), This Is 40 (2012), The Bubble (2022)	
Judd Apatow	Paul Rudd	The 40-Year-Old Virgin (2005), Knocked Up (2007), This Is 40 (2012)	
Darren Aronofsky	Mark Margolis	Pi (1998), Requiem for a Dream (2000), The Fountain (2006), The Wrestler (2008), Black Swan (2010), Noah (2014)	
Richard Attenborough	Anthony Hopkins	Young Winston (1972), A Bridge Too Far (1977), Magic (1978), Chaplin (1992), Shadowlands (1993)	
John G. Avildsen	Pat Morita	The Karate Kid (1984), The Karate Kid Part II (1986), The Karate Kid Part III (1989), Inferno (1999)	
David Ayer	David Harbour	End of Watch (2012), Suicide Squad (2016), A Working Man (2025)	
Sean Baker	Karren Karagulian	Take Out (2004), Prince of Broadway (2008), Starlet (2012), Tangerine (2015), The Florida Project (2017), Red Rocket (2021), Anora (2024)	
Noah Baumbach	Adam Driver	Frances Ha (2012), While We're Young (2014), The Meyerowitz Stories (2017), Marriage Story (2019), White Noise (2022)	
Noah Baumbach	Carlos Jacott	Kicking and Screaming (1995), Mr. Jealousy (1997), The Meyerowitz Stories (2017), Marriage Story (2019), White Noise (2022)	
Noah Baumbach	Ben Stiller	Greenberg (2010), While We're Young (2014), The Meyerowitz Stories (2017)	
Michael Bay	Steve Buscemi	Armageddon (1998), The Island (2005), Transformers: The Last Knight (2017)	
Michael Bay	Megan Fox	Bad Boys II (2003, uncredited extra), Transformers (2007), Transformers: Revenge of the Fallen (2009)	
Michael Bay	Peter Stormare	Armageddon (1998), Bad Boys II (2003), The Island (2005)	
Michael Bay	Mark Wahlberg	Pain & Gain (2013), Transformers: Age of Extinction (2014), Transformers: The Last Knight (2017)	
Ingmar Bergman	Bibi Andersson	Smiles of a Summer Night (1955), The Seventh Seal (1957), Wild Strawberries (1957), Brink of Life (1958), The Magician (1958), Persona (1966), The Passion of Anna (1969), The Touch (1971), Scenes from a Marriage (1973, TV)	
Ingmar Bergman	Harriet Andersson	10 different films between 1953 and 1986.	
Ingmar Bergman	Erland Josephson	13 different films between 1946 and 1984.	
Ingmar Bergman	Gunnel Lindblom	The Seventh Seal (1957), Wild Strawberries (1957), The Venetian (1958, TV), Rabies (1958, TV), The Virgin Spring (1960), Winter Light (1962), The Silence (1963), Scenes from a Marriage (1973, TV)	
Ingmar Bergman	Ingrid Thulin	Wild Strawberries (1957), Brink of Life (1958), The Magician (1958), Winter Light (1962), The Silence (1963), Hour of the Wolf (1968), The Rite (1969, TV), Cries and Whispers (1972), After the Rehearsal (1984)	
Ingmar Bergman	Max von Sydow	12 different films between 1957 and 1971.	
Ingmar Bergman	Liv Ullmann	10 different films between 1966 and 2003.	
Luc Besson	Jean Reno	Le Dernier Combat (1983), Subway (1985), The Big Blue (1988), La Femme Nikita (1990), Léon: The Professional (1994)	
Kathryn Bigelow	Tom Sizemore	Blue Steel (1990), Point Break (1991, uncredited cameo), Strange Days (1995)	
Shane Black	Robert Downey Jr.	Kiss Kiss Bang Bang (2005), Iron Man 3 (2013), The Nice Guys (2016, uncredited cameo)	
Peter Bogdanovich	Eileen Brennan	The Last Picture Show (1971), Daisy Miller (1974), At Long Last Love (1975), Texasville (1990)	
Peter Bogdanovich	Colleen Camp	They All Laughed (1981), Illegally Yours (1988), She's Funny That Way (2014)	
Peter Bogdanovich	Harry Carey Jr.	Nickelodeon (1976), Mask (1985), Illegally Yours (1988)	
Peter Bogdanovich	John Hillerman	The Last Picture Show (1971), What's Up, Doc? (1972), Paper Moon (1973), At Long Last Love (1975)	
Peter Bogdanovich	Madeline Kahn	What's Up, Doc? (1972), Paper Moon (1973), At Long Last Love (1975)	
Peter Bogdanovich	Cloris Leachman	The Last Picture Show (1971), Daisy Miller (1974), Texasville (1990)	
Peter Bogdanovich	George Morfogen	Daisy Miller (1974), They All Laughed (1981), Illegally Yours (1988), She's Funny That Way (2014)	
Peter Bogdanovich	Ryan O'Neal	What's Up, Doc? (1972), Paper Moon (1973), Nickelodeon (1976)	
Peter Bogdanovich	Tatum O'Neal	Paper Moon (1973), Nickelodeon (1976), She's Funny That Way (2014)	
Peter Bogdanovich	John Ritter	Nickelodeon (1976), They All Laughed (1981), Noises Off (1992)	
Peter Bogdanovich	Cybill Shepherd	The Last Picture Show (1971), Daisy Miller (1974), At Long Last Love (1975)Texasville (1990), She's Funny That Way (2014)	
Peter Bogdanovich	Randy Quaid	The Last Picture Show (1971), What's Up, Doc? (1972), Paper Moon (1973), Texasville (1990)	
Peter Bogdanovich	M. Emmet Walsh	What's Up, Doc? (1972), At Long Last Love (1975), Nickelodeon (1976)	
Bong Joon Ho	Song Kang-ho	Memories of Murder (2003), The Host (2006), Snowpiercer (2013), Parasite (2019)	
Danny Boyle	Robert Carlyle	Trainspotting (1996), The Beach (2000), 28 Weeks Later (2007, opening scene only), T2 Trainspotting (2017), Yesterday (2019, uncredited)	
Danny Boyle	Ewan McGregor	Shallow Grave (1994), Trainspotting (1996), A Life Less Ordinary (1997), T2 Trainspotting (2017)	
Kenneth Branagh	Brian Blessed	Henry V (1989), Much Ado About Nothing (1993), Hamlet (1996), As You Like It (2006)	
Kenneth Branagh	Richard Briers	Henry V (1989), Peter's Friends (1992), Much Ado About Nothing (1993), Mary Shelley's Frankenstein (1994), In the Bleak Midwinter (1995), Hamlet (1996), Love's Labour's Lost (2000), As You Like It (2006), Murder on the Orient Express (2017)	
Kenneth Branagh	Judi Dench	Henry V (1989), Hamlet (1996), Murder on the Orient Express (2017), All Is True (2018), Artemis Fowl (2020), Belfast (2021)	
Kenneth Branagh	Gerard Horan	Much Ado About Nothing (1993), Mary Shelley's Frankenstein (1994), In the Bleak Midwinter (1995), As You Like It (2006), All Is True (2018), Artemis Fowl (2020), Belfast (2021)	
Kenneth Branagh	Derek Jacobi	Henry V (1989), Hamlet (1996), Cinderella (2015), Murder on the Orient Express (2017)	
Kenneth Branagh	Emma Thompson	Henry V (1989), Dead Again (1991), Peter's Friends (1992), Much Ado About Nothing (1993)	
James L. Brooks	Albert Brooks	Broadcast News (1987), I'll Do Anything (1994), Ella McCay (2025)	
James L. Brooks	Jack Nicholson	Terms of Endearment (1983), Broadcast News (1987, cameo), As Good as It Gets (1997), How Do You Know (2010)	
Tod Browning	Lon Chaney	10 different films between 1919 and 1929.	
Tim Burton	Helena Bonham Carter	Planet of the Apes (2001), Big Fish (2003), Charlie and the Chocolate Factory (2005), Corpse Bride (2005), Sweeney Todd: The Demon Barber of Fleet Street (2007), Alice in Wonderland (2010), Dark Shadows (2012)	
Tim Burton	Johnny Depp	Edward Scissorhands (1990), Ed Wood (1994), Sleepy Hollow (1999), Corpse Bride (2005), Charlie and the Chocolate Factory (2005), Sweeney Todd: The Demon Barber of Fleet Street (2007), Alice in Wonderland (2010), Dark Shadows (2012)	
Tim Burton	Danny DeVito	Batman Returns (1992), Mars Attacks! (1996), Big Fish (2003), Dumbo (2019), Beetlejuice Beetlejuice (2024)	
Tim Burton	Christopher Lee	Sleepy Hollow (1999), Charlie and the Chocolate Factory (2005), Corpse Bride (2005), Alice in Wonderland (2010), Dark Shadows (2012)	
Tim Burton	Michael Keaton	Beetlejuice (1988), Batman (1989), Batman Returns (1992), Dumbo (2019), Beetlejuice Beetlejuice (2024)	
Tim Burton	Michael Gough	Batman (1989), Batman Returns (1992), Sleepy Hollow (1999), Corpse Bride (2005), Alice in Wonderland (2010)	
Tim Burton	Eva Green	Dark Shadows (2012), Big Eyes (2014), Miss Peregrine's Home for Peculiar Children (2016), Wednesday (2022-, season three)	
Tim Burton	Jeffrey Jones	Beetlejuice (1988), Ed Wood (1994), Sleepy Hollow (1999)	
Tim Burton	Martin Landau	Ed Wood (1994), Sleepy Hollow (1999), Frankenweenie (2012)	
Tim Burton	Lisa Marie	Ed Wood (1994), Mars Attacks! (1996), Sleepy Hollow (1999), Planet of the Apes (2001)	
Tim Burton	Catherine O'Hara	Beetlejuice (1988), Frankenweenie (2012), Beetlejuice Beetlejuice (2024)	
Tim Burton	Deep Roy	Big Fish (2003), Charlie and the Chocolate Factory (2005), Corpse Bride (2005)	
Tim Burton	Winona Ryder	Beetlejuice (1988), Edward Scissorhands (1990), Frankenweenie (2012), Beetlejuice Beetlejuice (2024)	
Tim Burton	Glenn Shadix	Beetlejuice (1988), Planet of the Apes (2001), Stainboy (2000–2001)	
James Cameron	Bill Paxton	The Terminator (1984), Aliens (1986), True Lies (1994), Titanic (1997), Ghosts of the Abyss (2003, cameo)	
James Cameron	Arnold Schwarzenegger	The Terminator (1984), Terminator 2: Judgment Day (1991), True Lies (1994), T2-3D: Battle Across Time (1996)	
James Cameron	Michael Biehn	The Terminator (1984), Aliens (1986), The Abyss (1989), Terminator 2: Judgment Day (1991, special edition only)	
James Cameron	Jenette Goldstein	Aliens (1986), Terminator 2: Judgment Day (1991), Titanic (1997)	
James Cameron	Lance Henriksen	Piranha II: The Spawning (1982), The Terminator (1984), Aliens (1986)	
James Cameron	Sigourney Weaver	Aliens (1986), Avatar (2009), Avatar: The Way of Water (2022), Avatar: Fire and Ash (2025)	
James Cameron	Kate Winslet	Titanic (1997), Avatar: The Way of Water (2022), Avatar: Fire and Ash (2025)	
Martin Campbell	Eva Green	Casino Royale (2006), Dirty Angels (2024), Just Play Dead (2026)	
Jane Campion	Genevieve Lemon	Sweetie (1989), The Piano (1993), Holy Smoke! (1999), The Power of the Dog (2021)	
Guillaume Canet	Marion Cotillard	Little White Lies (2010), Blood Ties (2013), Rock'n Roll (2017), Asterix & Obelix: The Middle Kingdom (2023), Karma (2026)	
Leos Carax	Denis Lavant	Boy Meets Girl (1984), Mauvais Sang (1986), Mister Lonely (2007), Tokyo! (2008), Holy Motors (2012)	
John Carpenter	Adrienne Barbeau	Someone's Watching Me! (1978, TV), The Fog (1980), Escape from New York (1981), The Thing (1982, voice only)	
John Carpenter	Robert Carradine	Body Bags (1993, TV, segment "The Morgue"), Escape from L.A. (1996), Ghosts of Mars (2001)	
John Carpenter	Nick Castle	Dark Star (1974), Halloween (1978), Escape from New York (1981), Escape from L.A. (1996)	
John Carpenter	Charles Cyphers	Assault on Precinct 13 (1976), Halloween (1978), Someone's Watching Me! (1978, TV), Elvis (1979, TV), The Fog (1980), Escape from New York (1981)	
John Carpenter	Jamie Lee Curtis	Halloween (1978), The Fog (1980), Escape from New York (1981, uncredited voice only)	
John Carpenter	George Buck Flower	The Fog (1980), Escape from New York (1981), Christine (1984), Prince of Darkness (1987), They Live (1988), Village of the Damned (1995), Body Bags (1993, TV, segment "The Morgue")	
John Carpenter	Peter Jason	Prince of Darkness (1987), They Live (1988), Body Bags (1993, TV, segment "The Morgue"), In the Mouth of Madness (1994), Village of the Damned (1995), Escape from L.A. (1996), Ghosts of Mars (2001)	
John Carpenter	Nancy Kyes	Assault on Precinct 13 (1976), Halloween (1978), The Fog (1980)	
John Carpenter	Al Leong	Big Trouble in Little China (1986), They Live (1988, uncredited), Escape from L.A. (1996)	
John Carpenter	Robert Phalen	Halloween (1978), Someone's Watching Me! (1978, TV), Starman (1984)	
John Carpenter	Donald Pleasence	Halloween (1978), Escape from New York (1981), Prince of Darkness (1987)	
John Carpenter	Kurt Russell	Elvis (1979, TV), Escape from New York (1981), The Thing (1982), Big Trouble in Little China (1986), Escape from L.A. (1996)	
Claude Chabrol	Stéphane Audran	23 different films between 1959 and 1992.	
Claude Chabrol	Jean-Pierre Cassel	The Breach (1970), The Twist (1976), Hell (1994), La Cérémonie (1995)	
Claude Chabrol	Isabelle Huppert	Story of Women (1988), Madame Bovary (1991), La Cérémonie (1995), The Swindle (1997), Merci pour le Chocolat (2000), Comedy of Power (2006)	
Charlie Chaplin	Edna Purviance	37 different collaborations between 1915 and 1952.	
Larry Charles	Sacha Baron Cohen	Borat (2006), Brüno (2009), The Dictator (2012)	
Jon M. Chu	Michelle Yeoh	Crazy Rich Asians (2018), Wicked (2024), Wicked: For Good (2025)	
Michael Cimino	Mickey Rourke	Heaven's Gate (1981), Year of the Dragon (1985), Desperate Hours (1990)	
George Clooney	Matt Damon	Confessions of a Dangerous Mind (2002, cameo), The Monuments Men (2014), Suburbicon (2017)	
Coen brothers	Michael Badalucco	Miller's Crossing (1990), O Brother, Where Art Thou? (2000), The Man Who Wasn't There (2001)	
Coen brothers	Josh Brolin	No Country for Old Men (2007), True Grit (2010), Hail, Caesar! (2016)	
Coen brothers	Steve Buscemi	Miller's Crossing (1990), Barton Fink (1991), The Hudsucker Proxy (1994), Fargo (1996), The Big Lebowski (1998), Paris, je t'aime (2006, segment: "Tuileries")	
Coen brothers	Bruce Campbell	Blood Simple (1984, promo trailer only), The Hudsucker Proxy (1994), Fargo (1996, soap opera excerpt), Intolerable Cruelty (2003), The Ladykillers (2004)	
Coen brothers	George Clooney	O Brother, Where Art Thou? (2000), Intolerable Cruelty (2003), Burn After Reading (2008), Hail, Caesar! (2016)	
Coen brothers	John Goodman	Raising Arizona (1987), Barton Fink (1991), The Hudsucker Proxy (1994), The Big Lebowski (1998), O Brother, Where Art Thou? (2000), Inside Llewyn Davis (2013)	
Coen brothers	Holly Hunter	Blood Simple (1984, voice cameo), Raising Arizona (1987), O Brother, Where Art Thou? (2000)	
Coen brothers	Richard Jenkins	The Man Who Wasn't There (2001), Intolerable Cruelty (2003), Burn After Reading (2008)	
Coen brothers	Warren Keith	Raising Arizona (1987), Fargo (1996), The Big Lebowski (1998), A Serious Man (2009, voice only)	
Coen brothers	Frances McDormand	10 different films from 1984 to the present.	
Coen brothers	Jon Polito	Miller's Crossing (1990), Barton Fink (1991), The Hudsucker Proxy (1994), The Big Lebowski (1998), The Man Who Wasn't There (2001)	
Coen brothers	Stephen Root	O Brother, Where Art Thou? (2000), The Ladykillers (2004), No Country for Old Men (2007), The Ballad of Buster Scruggs (2018)	
Coen brothers	J. K. Simmons	The Ladykillers (2004), Burn After Reading (2008), True Grit (2010, voice cameo)	
Coen brothers	John Turturro	Miller's Crossing (1990), Barton Fink (1991), The Big Lebowski (1998), O Brother, Where Art Thou? (2000)	
Jaume Collet-Serra	Liam Neeson	Unknown (2011), Non-Stop (2014), The Commuter (2018)	
Chris Columbus	Pierce Brosnan	Mrs. Doubtfire (1993), Percy Jackson & the Olympians: The Lightning Thief (2010), The Thursday Murder Club (2025)	
Chris Columbus	Macaulay Culkin	Home Alone (1990), Only the Lonely (1991, cameo), Home Alone 2: Lost in New York (1992)	
Chris Columbus	Kieran Culkin	Home Alone (1990), Only the Lonely (1991, cameo), Home Alone 2: Lost in New York (1992)	
Chris Columbus	Fiona Shaw	Harry Potter and the Philosopher's Stone (2001), Harry Potter and the Chamber of Secrets (2002), Pixels (2015)	
Chris Columbus	Robin Williams	Mrs. Doubtfire (1993), Nine Months (1995, cameo), Bicentennial Man (1999)	
Francis Ford Coppola	Robert Duvall	The Rain People (1969), The Godfather (1972), The Godfather Part II (1974), The Conversation (1974, uncredited), Apocalypse Now (1979)	
Francis Ford Coppola	Diane Keaton	The Godfather (1972), The Godfather Part II (1974), The Godfather Part III (1990)	
Francis Ford Coppola	Al Pacino	The Godfather (1972), The Godfather Part II (1974), The Godfather Part III (1990)	
Francis Ford Coppola	James Caan	The Rain People (1969), The Godfather (1972), The Godfather Part II (1974), Gardens of Stone (1987)	
Francis Ford Coppola	John Cazale	The Godfather (1972), The Godfather Part II (1974), The Conversation (1974)	
Francis Ford Coppola	Laurence Fishburne	Apocalypse Now (1979), Rumble Fish (1983), The Cotton Club (1984), Gardens of Stone (1987), Megalopolis (2024)	
Francis Ford Coppola	Nicolas Cage	Rumble Fish (1983), The Cotton Club (1984), Peggy Sue Got Married (1986)	
Francis Ford Coppola	Frederic Forrest	The Conversation (1974), Apocalypse Now (1979), One from the Heart (1982), Tucker: The Man and His Dream (1988)	
Francis Ford Coppola	Allen Garfield	The Conversation (1974), One from the Heart (1981), The Cotton Club (1984)	
Francis Ford Coppola	Diane Lane	The Outsiders (1983), Rumble Fish (1983), The Cotton Club (1984), Jack (1996)	
Francis Ford Coppola	Dean Stockwell	Gardens of Stone (1987), Tucker: The Man and His Dream (1988), The Rainmaker (1997)	
Francis Ford Coppola	Abe Vigoda	The Godfather (1972), The Godfather Part II (1974), The Conversation (1974, scene deleted)	
Francis Ford Coppola	Tom Waits	One from the Heart (1981, uncredited), The Outsiders (1983), Rumble Fish (1983), The Cotton Club (1984), Bram Stoker's Dracula (1992), Twixt (2011)	
Francis Ford Coppola	Italia Coppola	The Godfather (1972, uncredited), The Godfather Part II (1974, uncredited), One from the Heart (1981)	
Francis Ford Coppola	Gian-Carlo Coppola	The Godfather (1972, uncredited), The Conversation (1974, uncredited), Apocalypse Now (1979, redux and final cut versions only), Rumble Fish (1983)	
Sofia Coppola	Kirsten Dunst	The Virgin Suicides (1999), Marie Antoinette (2006), The Bling Ring (2013, cameo as herself), The Beguiled (2017)	
Sofia Coppola	Bill Murray	Lost in Translation (2003), A Very Murray Christmas (2015), On the Rocks (2020)	
Ryan Coogler	Michael B. Jordan	Fruitvale Station (2013), Creed (2015), Black Panther (2018), Black Panther: Wakanda Forever (2022), Sinners (2025)	
Scott Cooper	Christian Bale	Out of the Furnace (2013), Hostiles (2017), The Pale Blue Eye (2022)	
Brady Corbet	Stacy Martin	The Childhood of a Leader (2015), Vox Lux (2018), The Brutalist (2024)	
Wes Craven	Heather Langenkamp	A Nightmare on Elm Street (1984), Shocker (1989, cameo), Wes Craven's New Nightmare (1994)	
Destin Daniel Cretton	Brie Larson	Short Term 12 (2013), The Glass Castle (2017), Just Mercy (2019), Shang-Chi and the Legend of the Ten Rings (2021, cameo)	
David Cronenberg	Viggo Mortensen	A History of Violence (2005), Eastern Promises (2007), A Dangerous Method (2011), Crimes of the Future (2022)	
Cameron Crowe	Eric Stoltz	Say Anything...(1989), Singles (1992), Jerry Maguire (1996)	
George Cukor	Katharine Hepburn	10 different films between 1932 and 1979.	
Richard Curtis	Bill Nighy	Love Actually (2003), The Boat That Rocked (2009), About Time (2013), Red Nose Day Actually (2017, TV)	

== List of collaborations (D-F) ==
Director	Actor	Films	Ref.
Nia DaCosta	Tessa Thompson	Little Woods (2018), The Marvels (2023, cameo), Hedda (2025)	
Brian De Palma	Nancy Allen	Carrie (1976), Home Movies (1979), Dressed to Kill (1980), Blow Out (1981)	
Brian De Palma	Steven Bauer	Scarface (1983), Body Double (1984, uncredited cameo), Raising Cain (1992)	
Brian De Palma	Robert De Niro	Greetings (1968), The Wedding Party (1969), Hi, Mom! (1970), The Untouchables (1987)	
Brian De Palma	Charles Durning	Hi, Mom! (1970), Sisters (1972), The Fury (1978), Scarface (1983, voice only)	
Brian De Palma	William Finley	Woton's Wake (1962, short), Murder à la Mod (1968), The Wedding Party (1969), Sisters (1972), Phantom of the Paradise (1974), The Fury (1978), Dressed to Kill (1980), The Black Dahlia (2006)	
Brian De Palma	Dennis Franz	The Fury (1978), Dressed to Kill (1980), Blow Out (1981), Scarface (1983, uncredited voice), Body Double (1984)	
Brian De Palma	Gerrit Graham	Greetings (1968), Hi, Mom! (1970), Phantom of the Paradise (1974), Home Movies (1979)	
Brian De Palma	Amy Irving	Carrie (1976), The Fury (1978), Casualties of War (1989, uncredited voice)	
Brian De Palma	John Lithgow	Obsession (1976), Blow Out (1981), Raising Cain (1992)	
Guillermo del Toro	Burn Gorman	Pacific Rim (2013), Crimson Peak (2015), Guillermo del Toro's Pinocchio (2022), Frankenstein (2025)	
Guillermo del Toro	Doug Jones	Mimic (1997), Hellboy (2004), Pan's Labyrinth (2006), Hellboy II: The Golden Army (2008), Crimson Peak (2015), The Shape of Water (2017)	
Guillermo del Toro	Ron Perlman	Cronos (1992), Blade II (2002), Hellboy (2004), Hellboy II: The Golden Army (2008), Pacific Rim (2013), Nightmare Alley (2021), Guillermo del Toro's Pinocchio (2022)	
Jonathan Demme	Ted Levine	The Silence of the Lambs (1991), The Truth About Charlie (2002), The Manchurian Candidate (2004)	
Jonathan Demme	Charles Napier	10 different films between 1977 and 2004.	
Jonathan Demme	Jason Robards	Melvin and Howard (1980), Philadelphia (1993), Beloved (1998)	
Arnaud Desplechin	Marion Cotillard	My Sex Life... or How I Got into an Argument (1996), Ismael's Ghosts (2016), Brother and Sister (2022)	
Richard Donner	Ned Beatty	Superman (1978), The Toy (1982), Superman II: The Richard Donner Cut (2006)	
Richard Donner	Mel Gibson	Lethal Weapon (1987), Lethal Weapon 2 (1989), Lethal Weapon 3 (1992), Maverick (1994), Conspiracy Theory (1997), Lethal Weapon 4 (1998)	
Richard Donner	Danny Glover	Lethal Weapon (1987), Lethal Weapon 2 (1989), Lethal Weapon 3 (1992), Maverick (1994, uncredited cameo), Lethal Weapon 4 (1998)	
Richard Donner	Steve Kahan	Lethal Weapon (1987), Lethal Weapon 2 (1989), Tales from the Crypt (1989, episode "Dig That Cat... He's Real Gone"), Lethal Weapon 3 (1992), Maverick (1994), Assassins (1995), Conspiracy Theory (1997), Lethal Weapon 4 (1998)	
Richard Donner	Margot Kidder	Superman (1978), Maverick (1994, cameo), Superman II: The Richard Donner Cut (2006)	
Richard Donner	Mary Ellen Trainor	The Goonies (1985), Lethal Weapon (1987), Scrooged (1988), Lethal Weapon 2 (1989), Lethal Weapon 3 (1992), Lethal Weapon 4 (1998)	
Clint Eastwood	Morgan Freeman	Unforgiven (1992), Million Dollar Baby (2004), Invictus (2009)	
Clint Eastwood	Alison Eastwood	Bronco Billy (1980, uncredited), Absolute Power (1997, uncredited), Midnight in the Garden of Good and Evil (1997), The Mule (2018)	
Clint Eastwood	Francesca Eastwood	True Crime (1999), Jersey Boys (2014), Juror No. 2 (2024)	
Clint Eastwood	Kyle Eastwood	The Outlaw Josey Wales (1976, uncredited), Bronco Billy (1980, uncredited), Honkytonk Man (1982), The Rookie (1990), The Bridges of Madison County (1995), J. Edgar (2011)	
Clint Eastwood	Scott Eastwood	Flags of Our Fathers (2006), Gran Torino (2008), Invictus (2009)	
Clint Eastwood	Geoffrey Lewis	High Plains Drifter (1973), Bronco Billy (1980), Midnight in the Garden of Good and Evil (1997)	
Clint Eastwood	Sondra Locke	The Outlaw Josey Wales (1976), The Gauntlet (1977), Bronco Billy (1980), Sudden Impact (1983), Amazing Stories (1985, episode "Vanessa in the Garden")	
Clint Eastwood	Doug McGrath	The Outlaw Josey Wales (1976), The Gauntlet (1977), Bronco Billy (1980), Pale Rider (1985)	
Clint Eastwood	Bill McKinney	The Outlaw Josey Wales (1976), The Gauntlet (1977), Bronco Billy (1980)	
Robert Eggers	Willem Dafoe	The Lighthouse (2019), The Northman (2022), Nosferatu (2024), Werwulf (2026)	
Robert Eggers	Ralph Ineson	The Witch (2015), The Northman (2022), Nosferatu (2024), Werwulf (2026)	
Roland Emmerich	Joey King	White House Down (2013), Stonewall (2015), Independence Day: Resurgence (2016)	
Farrelly brothers	Jim Carrey	Dumb and Dumber (1994), Me, Myself & Irene (2000), Dumb and Dumber To (2014)	
Farrelly brothers	Chris Elliott	Kingpin (1996), Me, Myself & Irene (2000), Osmosis Jones (2001)	
Farrelly brothers	Richard Jenkins	There's Something About Mary (1998, uncredited), Me, Myself & Irene (2000), Hall Pass (2011)	
Farrelly brothers	Bill Murray	Kingpin (1996), Osmosis Jones (2001), Dumb and Dumber To (2014, cameo), The Greatest Beer Run Ever (2022, Peter only)	
Farrelly brothers	Ben Stiller	There's Something About Mary (1998), The Heartbreak Kid (2007), Dear Santa (2024, uncredited, Bobby only)	
Jon Favreau	Leslie Bibb	Iron Man (2008), Iron Man 2 (2010), About a Boy (2014, Pilot)	
Jon Favreau	Robert Downey Jr.	Iron Man (2008), Iron Man 2 (2010), Chef (2014)	
Jon Favreau	Scarlett Johansson	Iron Man 2 (2010), Chef (2014), The Jungle Book (2016)	
Jon Favreau	Sam Rockwell	Made (2001), Iron Man 2 (2010), Cowboys & Aliens (2011)	
Federico Fellini	Marcello Mastroianni	La Dolce Vita (1960), 8½ (1963), Roma (1972), La città delle donne (1980), Ginger e Fred (1986), Intervista (1987)	
Federico Fellini	Giulietta Masina	Luci del varietà (1950), Lo sceicco bianco (1952), La strada (1954), Il bidone (1955), Le notti di Cabiria (1957), Juliet of the Spirits (1965), Ginger e Fred (1986)	
Paul Feig	Melissa McCarthy	Bridesmaids (2011), The Heat (2013), Spy (2015), Ghostbusters (2016)	
David Fincher	Holt McCallany	Alien 3 (1992), Fight Club (1999), The Further Mis-Adventures of Cliff Booth (2026)	
David Fincher	Brad Pitt	Seven (1995), Fight Club (1999), The Curious Case of Benjamin Button (2008), The Further Mis-Adventures of Cliff Booth (2026)	
Mike Flanagan	Annalise Basso	Oculus (2013), Ouija: Origin of Evil (2016), The Life of Chuck (2024)	
Mike Flanagan	Justin Gordon	Absentia (2011), Oculus (2013), Before I Wake (2016)	
Mike Flanagan	Bruce Greenwood	Gerald's Game (2017), Doctor Sleep (2019), The Fall of the House of Usher (2023, TV)	
Mike Flanagan	Carla Gugino	Gerald's Game (2017), The Haunting of Hill House (2018, TV), Midnight Mass (2021, TV), The Fall of the House of Usher (2023, TV), The Life of Chuck (2024, voice only), Carrie (2026, episode "First Period"), The Exorcist: Martyrs (2027)	
Mike Flanagan	Rahul Kohli	Midnight Mass (2021, TV), The Midnight Club (2022, TV), The Fall of the House of Usher (2023, TV), The Life of Chuck (2024), Carrie (2026, TV), The Exorcist: Martyrs (2027)	
Mike Flanagan	Robert Longstreet	Doctor Sleep (2019), Midnight Mass (2021, TV), The Midnight Club (2022, TV), The Fall of the House of Usher (2023, TV), The Exorcist: Martyrs (2027)	
Mike Flanagan	Carl Lumbly	Doctor Sleep (2019), The Fall of the House of Usher (2023, TV), The Life of Chuck (2024), The Exorcist: Martyrs (2027)	
Mike Flanagan	Samantha Sloyan	Hush (2016), The Haunting of Hill House (2018, TV), Midnight Mass (2021, TV), The Midnight Club (2022, TV), The Fall of the House of Usher (2023, TV), The Life of Chuck (2024), Carrie (2026, TV), The Exorcist: Martyrs (2027)	
Mike Flanagan	Kate Siegel	11 different collaborations from 2013 to the present.	
Mike Flanagan	Henry Thomas	Ouija: Origin of Evil (2016), Gerald's Game (2017), Doctor Sleep (2019), The Haunting of Bly Manor (2020, TV), Midnight Mass (2021, TV), The Fall of the House of Usher (2023, TV)	
Mike Flanagan	Michael Trucco	Hush (2016), The Fall of the House of Usher (2023, TV), The Life of Chuck (2024), Carrie (2026, TV)	
Ruben Fleischer	Jesse Eisenberg	Zombieland (2009), 30 Minutes Or Less (2011), Zombieland: Double Tap (2019), Now You See Me: Now You Don't (2025)	
Ruben Fleischer	Woody Harrelson	Zombieland (2009), Venom (2018, cameo), Zombieland: Double Tap (2019), Now You See Me: Now You Don't (2025)	
Ruben Fleischer	Emma Stone	Zombieland (2009), Gangster Squad (2013), Zombieland: Double Tap (2019)	
Stephen Frears	Steve Coogan	Philomena (2013), The Lost King (2022), Brian and Maggie (2025, TV)	
Stephen Frears	Judi Dench	Saigon: Year of the Cat (1983, TV), Mrs Henderson Presents (2005), Philomena (2013), Victoria & Abdul (2017)	
Stephen Frears	Michael Sheen	Mary Reilly (1996), The Deal (2003, TV), The Queen (2006), Quiz (2020, TV)	
Antoine Fuqua	Ethan Hawke	Training Day (2001), Brooklyn's Finest (2009), The Magnificent Seven (2016), The Guilty (2021)	
Antoine Fuqua	Denzel Washington	Training Day (2001), The Equalizer (2014), The Magnificent Seven (2016), The Equalizer 2 (2018), The Equalizer 3 (2023)	

== List of collaborations (G-I) ==
Director	Actor	Films	Ref.
Alex Garland	Sonoya Mizuno	Ex Machina (2014), Annihilation (2018), Men (2022), Civil War (2024), Elden Ring (2028)	
Terry Gilliam	John Cleese	Monty Python and the Holy Grail (1975), Monty Python's Life of Brian (1979, opening scene only), Time Bandits (1981)	
Terry Gilliam	Eric Idle	Monty Python and the Holy Grail (1975), Monty Python's The Meaning of Life (1983, The Crimson Permanent Assurance), The Adventures of Baron Munchausen (1988)	
Terry Gilliam	Terry Jones	Monty Python and the Holy Grail (1975), Jabberwocky (1977), Monty Python's Life of Brian (1979, opening scene only), Monty Python's The Meaning of Life (1983, The Crimson Permanent Assurance)	
Terry Gilliam	Michael Palin	Monty Python and the Holy Grail (1975), Jabberwocky (1977), Monty Python's Life of Brian (1979, opening scene only), Time Bandits (1981), Monty Python's The Meaning of Life (1983, The Crimson Permanent Assurance), Brazil (1985)	
Terry Gilliam	Jonathan Pryce	Brazil (1985), The Adventures of Baron Munchausen (1988), The Brothers Grimm (2005), The Man Who Killed Don Quixote (2018)	
Terry Gilliam	Katherine Helmond	Time Bandits (1981), Brazil (1985), Fear and Loathing in Las Vegas (1998)	
Terry Gilliam	Charles McKeown	Time Bandits (1981), Brazil (1985), The Adventures of Baron Munchausen (1988), The Imaginarium of Doctor Parnassus (2009)	
Terry Gilliam	Derrick O'Connor	Jabberwocky (1977), Time Bandits (1981), Brazil (1985)	
Terry Gilliam	Peter Stormare	The Brothers Grimm (2005), The Imaginarium of Doctor Parnassus (2009), The Zero Theorem (2013)	
Jean-Luc Godard	Anna Karina	A Woman Is a Woman (1961), Vivre sa vie (1962), Le petit soldat (1963), Bande à part (1964), Alphaville (1965), Pierrot le Fou (1965), Made in U.S.A. (1966), The Oldest Profession (1967, segment: "Anticipation")	
James Gray	Joaquin Phoenix	The Yards (2000), We Own the Night (2007), Two Lovers (2008), The Immigrant (2013)	
Paul Greengrass	Matt Damon	The Bourne Supremacy (2004), The Bourne Ultimatum (2007), Green Zone (2010), Jason Bourne (2016)	
D. W. Griffith	Lillian Gish	The Birth of a Nation (1915), Intolerance (1916), True Heart Susie (1919), Broken Blossoms (1919), Way Down East (1920), Orphans of the Storm (1921, incomplete)	
Luca Guadagnino	Fabrizia Sacchi	The Protagonists (1999), Melissa P. (2005), Suspiria (2018)	
Luca Guadagnino	Chloë Sevigny	We Are Who We Are (2020, TV), Bones and All (2022), After the Hunt (2025)	
Luca Guadagnino	Michael Stuhlbarg	Call Me by Your Name (2017), Salvatore: Shoemaker of Dreams (2020), After the Hunt (2025)	
Luca Guadagnino	Tilda Swinton	The Protagonists (1999), I Am Love (2009), A Bigger Splash (2015), Suspiria (2018)	
James Gunn	Sean Gunn	10 different collaborations between 2008 and 2025.	
James Gunn	Bradley Cooper	Guardians of the Galaxy (2014), Guardians of the Galaxy Vol. 2 (2017), The Guardians of the Galaxy Holiday Special (2022, TV), Guardians of the Galaxy Vol. 3 (2023), Superman (2025)	
James Gunn	Michael Rooker	10 different collaborations between 2006 and 2025.	
James Gunn	Nathan Fillion	10 different collaborations between 2006 and 2025.	
James Gunn	Pom Klementieff	Guardians of the Galaxy Vol. 2 (2017), The Suicide Squad (2021, uncredited), The Guardians of the Galaxy Holiday Special (2022, TV), Guardians of the Galaxy Vol. 3 (2023), Superman (2025, voice only)	
James Gunn	Michelle Gunn	Super (2010), Movie 43 (2013, Segment: "Beezel"), The Guardians of the Galaxy Holiday Special (2022)	
James Gunn	Sylvester Stallone	Guardians of the Galaxy Vol. 2 (2017), The Suicide Squad (2021), Guardians of the Galaxy Vol. 3 (2023)	
James Gunn	Gregg Henry	Slither (2006), Super (2010), Guardians of the Galaxy (2014), Guardians of the Galaxy Vol. 2 (2017), Guardians of the Galaxy Vol. 3 (2023), Creature Commandos (2024-)	
James Gunn	Steve Agee	Super (2010), Guardians of the Galaxy Vol. 2 (2017), The Suicide Squad (2021),Peacemaker (2022-2025), Creature Commandos (2024-)	
James Gunn	Maria Bakalova	The Guardians of the Galaxy Holiday Special (2022), Guardians of the Galaxy Vol. 3 (2023), Creature Commandos (2024-)	
James Gunn	Stephen Blackehart	11 different collaborations from 1997 to the present.	
James Gunn	Linda Cardellini	Super (2010), Creature Commandos (2024-), Guardians of the Galaxy Vol. 3 (2023)	
James Gunn	John Cena	The Suicide Squad (2021), Peacemaker (2022-2025), Superman (2025)	
James Gunn	Jennifer Holland	Guardians of the Galaxy Vol. 2 (2017), The Suicide Squad (2021), Superman (2025, uncredited voice)	
James Gunn	Mikaela Hoover	James Gunn's PG Porn (2008-2009), Super (2010), Guardians of the Galaxy (2014), The Suicide Squad (2021), Guardians of the Galaxy Vol. 3 (2023), Superman (2025), Man of Tomorrow (2027)	
James Gunn	Michael Rosenbaum	James Gunn's PG Porn (2008-2009), Guardians of the Galaxy Vol. 2 (2017), Superman (2025)	
James Gunn	Lloyd Kaufman	Troma's Edge (2000, episode: "The Debut"), Slither (2006), Super (2010), Guardians of the Galaxy (2014, cameo), Guardians of the Galaxy Vol. 2 (2017, uncredited cameo), The Suicide Squad (2021, uncredited cameo), Guardians of the Galaxy Vol. 3 (2023, voice cameo only), Superman (2025, uncredited cameo)	
Tsui Hark	Jet Li	Once Upon a Time in China (1991), Once Upon a Time in China II (1992), The Master (1992), Once Upon a Time in China III (1993), Flying Swords of Dragon Gate (2011)	
Renny Harlin	Samuel L. Jackson	The Long Kiss Goodnight (1996), Deep Blue Sea (1999), Cleaner (2007), The Beast (2026)	
Howard Hawks	Cary Grant	Bringing Up Baby (1938), Only Angels Have Wings (1939), His Girl Friday (1940), I Was a Male War Bride (1949), Monkey Business (1952)	
Todd Haynes	Julianne Moore	Safe (1995), Far from Heaven (2002), I'm Not There (2007), Wonderstruck (2017), May December (2023)	
Werner Herzog	Brad Dourif	Scream of Stone (1991), The Wild Blue Yonder (2005), Bad Lieutenant: Port of Call New Orleans (2009), My Son, My Son, What Have Ye Done? (2009)	
Werner Herzog	Klaus Kinski	Aguirre, the Wrath of God (1972), Nosferatu the Vampyre (1979), Woyzeck (1979), Fitzcarraldo (1982), Cobra Verde (1987)	
George Roy Hill	Paul Newman	Butch Cassidy and the Sundance Kid (1969), The Sting (1973), Slap Shot (1977)	
George Roy Hill	Robert Redford	Butch Cassidy and the Sundance Kid (1969), The Sting (1973), The Great Waldo Pepper (1975)	
Nicole Holofcener	Catherine Keener	Walking and Talking (1996), Lovely & Amazing (2001), Friends with Money (2006)	
Hong Sang-soo	Kim Min-hee	13 films from 2015 to present.	
Ron Howard	Tom Hanks	Splash (1984), Apollo 13 (1995), The Da Vinci Code (2006), Angels & Demons (2009), Inferno (2016)	
Ron Howard	Paul Bettany	A Beautiful Mind (2001), The Da Vinci Code (2006), Solo: A Star Wars Story (2018)	
Ron Howard	Jennifer Connelly	A Beautiful Mind (2001), The Dilemma (2011), Jim Henson Idea Man (2024)	
Ron Howard	Rance Howard	15 films from 1977 to 2011.	
Ron Howard	Michael Keaton	Night Shift (1982), Gung Ho (1986), The Paper (1994)	
Ron Howard	Clint Howard	17 films from 1977 to 2018.	
Ron Howard	Bryce Dallas Howard	Parenthood (1989), Apollo 13 (1995), How the Grinch Stole Christmas (2000), A Beautiful Mind (2001)	
James Ivory	Helena Bonham Carter	A Room with a View (1985), Maurice (1987, cameo), Howards End (1992)	
James Ivory	Simon Callow	A Room with a View (1985), Maurice (1987), Mr. & Mrs. Bridge (1990), Howards End (1992, cameo)	
James Ivory	Peter Cellier	A Room with a View (1985), Howards End (1992), The Remains of the Day (1993)	
James Ivory	Anthony Hopkins	Howards End (1992), The Remains of the Day (1993), Surviving Picasso (1996), The City of Your Final Destination (2009)	
James Ivory	Shashi Kapoor	The Householder (1963), Shakespeare Wallah (1965), Bombay Talkie (1970), Heat and Dust (1983)	

== List of collaborations (J-L) ==
Director	Actor	Films	Ref.
Peter Jackson	Jed Brophy	Braindead (1992), Heavenly Creatures (1994), The Lord of the Rings: The Fellowship of the Ring (2001), The Lord of the Rings: The Two Towers (2002), The Lord of the Rings: The Return of the King (2003), King Kong (2005), The Hobbit: An Unexpected Journey (2012), The Hobbit: The Desolation of Smaug (2013), The Hobbit: The Battle of the Five Armies (2014)	
Peter Jackson	Andy Serkis	The Lord of the Rings: The Fellowship of the Ring (2001), The Lord of the Rings: The Two Towers (2002), The Lord of the Rings: The Return of the King (2003), King Kong (2005), The Hobbit: An Unexpected Journey (2012)	
Jim Jarmusch	Roberto Benigni	Down by Law (1986), Night on Earth (1991), Coffee and Cigarettes (2003, segment "Strange to Meet You")	
Jim Jarmusch	Adam Driver	Paterson (2016), The Dead Don't Die (2019), Father Mother Sister Brother (2025)	
Jim Jarmusch	John Hurt	Dead Man (1995), The Limits of Control (2009), Only Lovers Left Alive (2013)	
Jim Jarmusch	John Lurie	Permanent Vacation (1980), Stranger Than Paradise (1984), Down by Law (1986),	
Jim Jarmusch	Bill Murray	Coffee and Cigarettes (2003, segment "Delirum"), Broken Flowers (2005), The Limits of Control (2009), The Dead Don't Die (2019)	
Jim Jarmusch	Iggy Pop	Coffee and Cigarettes: Somewhere in California (1993, short), Dead Man (1995), The Dead Don't Die (2019)	
Jim Jarmusch	Tilda Swinton	Broken Flowers (2005), The Limits of Control (2009), Only Lovers Left Alive (2013), The Dead Don't Die (2019)	
Jim Jarmusch	Tom Waits	Down by Law (1986), Mystery Train (1989), Coffee and Cigarettes: Somewhere in California (1993, short), The Dead Don't Die (2019), Father Mother Sister Brother (2025)	
Patty Jenkins	Chris Pine	Wonder Woman (2017), I Am the Night (2019, 2 episodes), Wonder Woman 1984 (2020)	
Anders Thomas Jensen	Mads Mikkelsen	Flickering Lights (2000), The Green Butchers (2003), Adam's Apples (2005), Men & Chicken (2015), Riders of Justice (2020), The Last Viking (2025)	
Rian Johnson	Joseph Gordon-Levitt	Brick (2005), The Brothers Bloom (2008), Looper (2012), Star Wars: The Last Jedi (2017), Knives Out (2019), Glass Onion (2022), Wake Up Dead Man (2025)	
Rian Johnson	Noah Segan	Brick (2005), The Brothers Bloom (2008), Looper (2012), Star Wars: The Last Jedi (2017), Knives Out (2019), Glass Onion (2022), Wake Up Dead Man (2025)	
Neil Jordan	Brendan Gleeson	Michael Collins (1996), The Butcher Boy (1997), Breakfast on Pluto (2005)	
Neil Jordan	Ian Hart	Michael Collins (1996), The Butcher Boy (1997), The End of the Affair (1999), Breakfast on Pluto (2005), Marlowe (2022)	
Neil Jordan	Liam Neeson	High Spirits (1988), Michael Collins (1996), Breakfast on Pluto (2005), Marlowe (2022)	
Neil Jordan	Stephen Rea	11 different films between 1982 and 2022.	
Neil Jordan	Gerard McSorley	Angel (1982), Michael Collins (1996), The Butcher Boy (1997)	
Jake Kasdan	Jack Black	Orange County (2002), Jumanji: Welcome to the Jungle (2017), Jumanji: The Next Level (2019), Jumanji: Open World (2026)	
Jake Kasdan	Colin Hanks	Orange County (2002), Jumanji: Welcome to the Jungle (2017), Jumanji: The Next Level (2019)	
Jake Kasdan	Dwayne Johnson	Jumanji: Welcome to the Jungle (2017), Jumanji: The Next Level (2019), Red One (2024), Jumanji: Open World (2026)	
Paul King	Sally Hawkins	Paddington (2014), Paddington 2 (2017), Wonka (2023)	
Kogonada	Haley Lu Richardson	Columbus (2017), After Yang (2021), Zi (2026)	
Stanley Kubrick	Philip Stone	A Clockwork Orange (1971), Barry Lyndon (1975), The Shining (1980)	
Stanley Kubrick	Joe Turkel	The Killing (1956), Paths of Glory (1957), The Shining (1980)	
Akira Kurosawa	Toshiro Mifune	16 different films between 1948 and 1965.	
Ringo Lam	Jean-Claude Van Damme	Maximum Risk (1996), Replicant (2001), In Hell (2003)	
Ringo Lam	Chow Yun-fat	City on Fire (1987), Prison on Fire (1987), The Eighth Happiness (1988), Wild Search (1989), Prison on Fire II (1991), Full Contact (1992)	
John Landis	Don Ameche	Trading Places (1983), Coming to America (1988, cameo), Oscar (1991)	
John Landis	Dan Aykroyd	The Blues Brothers (1980), Twilight Zone: The Movie (1983, opening segment only), Trading Places (1983), Into the Night (1985), Spies Like Us (1985), Blues Brothers 2000 (1998), Susan's Plan (1998)	
John Landis	Tim Curry	Oscar (1991), Psych (2007, episode "American Duos"), Burke & Hare (2010),	
John Landis	Eddie Murphy	Trading Places (1983), Coming to America (1988), Beverly Hills Cop III (1994)	
John Landis	Frank Oz	The Blues Brothers (1980), An American Werewolf in London (1981), Trading Places (1983), Spies Like Us (1985), Innocent Blood (1992), Blues Brothers 2000 (1998)	
John Landis	Joey Travolta	Oscar (1991), Beverly Hills Cop III (1994), Susan's Plan (1998)	
Yorgos Lanthimos	Emma Stone	The Favourite (2018), Poor Things (2023), Kinds of Kindness (2024), Bugonia (2025)	
Ang Lee	Sihung Lung	Pushing Hands (1991), The Wedding Banquet (1993), Eat Drink Man Woman (1994), Crouching Tiger, Hidden Dragon (2000)	
Spike Lee	Denzel Washington	Mo' Better Blues (1990), Malcolm X (1992), He Got Game (1998), Inside Man (2006), Highest 2 Lowest (2025)	
Spike Lee	Rosie Perez	Do the Right Thing (1989), All the Invisible Children (2005, Segment: "Jesus Children of America"), Highest 2 Lowest (2025, cameo only)	
Spike Lee	Nicholas Turturro	Do the Right Thing (1989), Mo' Better Blues (1990), Jungle Fever (1991), Malcolm X (1992), BlacKkKlansman (2018), Highest 2 Lowest (2025)	
Spike Lee	Samuel L. Jackson	School Daze (1988), Do the Right Thing (1989), Mo' Better Blues (1990), Jungle Fever (1991), Chi-Raq (2015)	
Spike Lee	Joie Lee	11 collaborations from 1986 to 2019.	
Spike Lee	John Turturro	Do the Right Thing (1989), Mo' Better Blues (1990), Jungle Fever (1991), Clockers (1995), Girl 6 (1996), He Got Game (1998), Summer of Sam (1999, voice only), She Hate Me (2004), Miracle at St. Anna (2008)	
Spike Lee	Bill Nunn	School Daze (1988), Do the Right Thing (1989), Mo' Better Blues (1990), He Got Game (1998)	
Spike Lee	Wesley Snipes	Mo' Better Blues (1990), Jungle Fever (1991), Chi-Raq (2015)	
Spike Lee	Isiah Whitlock Jr.	25th Hour (2002), She Hate Me (2004), Red Hook Summer (2012), Chi-Raq (2015), BlacKkKlansman (2018), Da 5 Bloods (2020)	
Spike Lee	Ossie Davis	School Daze (1988), Do the Right Thing (1989), Jungle Fever (1991), Malcolm X (1992, voice)	
Spike Lee	Giancarlo Esposito	School Daze (1988), Do the Right Thing (1989), Mo' Better Blues (1990), Jungle Fever (1991), Malcolm X (1992)	
Spike Lee	Delroy Lindo	Malcolm X (1992), Crooklyn (1994), Clockers (1995), Miracle at St. Anna (2008), Da 5 Bloods (2020)	
Spike Lee	John Leguizamo	John Leguizamo: Freak (1998, comedy special), Summer of Sam (1999), Miracle at St. Anna (2008)	
Spike Lee	Roger Guenveur Smith	School Daze (1988), Do the Right Thing (1989), Malcolm X (1992), He Got Game (1998), Summer of Sam (1999), Chi-Raq (2015)	
Spike Lee	Michael Imperioli	Jungle Fever (1991), Malcolm X (1992), Clockers (1995), Girl 6 (1996), Summer of Sam (1999)	
Mike Leigh	Jim Broadbent	Life Is Sweet (1990), Topsy-Turvy (1999), Vera Drake (2004), Another Year (2010)	
Mike Leigh	Sally Hawkins	All or Nothing (2002), Vera Drake (2004), Happy-Go-Lucky (2008)	
Mike Leigh	Lesley Manville	Too Much of a Good Thing (1979, radio play), BBC2 Playhouse (1980, episode: Grown-Ups), High Hopes (1988), Secrets & Lies (1996), Topsy-Turvy (1999), All or Nothing (2002), Vera Drake (2004), Another Year (2010), Mr. Turner (2014)	
David Leitch	Eddie Marsan	Atomic Blonde (2017), Deadpool 2 (2018), Hobbs & Shaw (2019)	
David Leitch	Ryan Reynolds	Deadpool 2 (2018), Hobbs & Shaw (2019), Bullet Train (2022, cameo)	
Louis Leterrier	Jason Statham	The Transporter (2002), Transporter 2 (2005), Fast X (2023)	
Barry Levinson	Robert De Niro	Sleepers (1996), Wag the Dog (1997), What Just Happened (2008), The Wizard of Lies (2017, TV), The Alto Knights (2025)	
Barry Levinson	Dustin Hoffman	Rain Man (1988), Sleepers (1996), Wag the Dog (1997), Sphere (1998)	
Barry Levinson	Al Pacino	The Humbling (2014), You Don't Know Jack (2010, TV), Paterno (2018, TV)	
Barry Levinson	Robin Williams	Good Morning, Vietnam (1987), Toys (1992), Man of the Year (2006)	
Barry Levinson	Bruce Willis	Bandits (2001), What Just Happened (2008), Rock the Kasbah (2015)	
Shawn Levy	Ryan Reynolds	Free Guy (2021), The Adam Project (2022), Deadpool & Wolverine (2024)	
Shawn Levy	Owen Wilson	Night at the Museum (2006), Night at the Museum: Battle of the Smithsonian (2009), The Internship (2013), Night at the Museum: Secret of the Tomb (2014)	
Justin Lin	Tyrese Gibson	Annapolis (2006), Fast Five (2011), Fast & Furious 6 (2013), F9 (2021)	
Justin Lin	Sung Kang	Better Luck Tomorrow (2002), The Fast and the Furious: Tokyo Drift (2006), Finishing the Game (2007), Fast & Furious (2009), Fast Five (2011), Fast & Furious 6 (2013), F9 (2021)	
Richard Linklater	Ethan Hawke	Before Sunrise (1995), The Newton Boys (1998), Waking Life (2001, cameo), Before Sunset (2004), Fast Food Nation (2006), Before Midnight (2013), Boyhood (2014), Blue Moon (2025)	
Richard Linklater	Glen Powell	Everybody Wants Some!! (2016), Apollo 10 1/2: A Space Age Childhood (2022), Hit Man (2023)	
Richard Linklater	Matthew McConaughey	Dazed and Confused (1993), The Newton Boys (1998), Bernie (2011)	
Richard Linklater	Jack Black	School of Rock (2003), Bernie (2011), Apollo 10 1/2: A Space Age Childhood (2022)	
Kenneth Lonergan	Matthew Broderick	You Can Count on Me (2000), Margaret (2011), Manchester by the Sea (2016)	
Nick Love	Danny Dyer	Goodbye Charlie Bright (2001), The Football Factory (2004), The Business (2005), Outlaw (2007), Marching Powder (2025)	
David Lowery	Casey Affleck	Ain't Them Bodies Saints (2013), A Ghost Story (2017), The Old Man & the Gun (2018)	
Baz Luhrmann	Nicole Kidman	Moulin Rouge! (2001), No. 5 the Film (2004, short), Australia (2008)	
Baz Luhrmann	David Wenham	Moulin Rouge! (2001), Australia (2008), Elvis (2022)	
Sidney Lumet	Harry Andrews	The Hill (1965), The Deadly Affair (1967), The Sea Gull (1968), Equus (1977)	
Sidney Lumet	Martin Balsam	12 Angry Men (1957), Kraft Television Theatre (1958, episode Dog in a Bush Tunnel), NBC Sunday Showcase (1959, episode Sacco-Vanzetti Story), The Anderson Tapes (1971), Murder on the Orient Express (1974)	
Sidney Lumet	Sean Connery	The Hill (1965), The Anderson Tapes (1971), The Offence (1973), Murder on the Orient Express (1974), Family Business (1989)	
Sidney Lumet	Henry Fonda	12 Angry Men (1957), Stage Struck (1958), Fail Safe (1964)	
Sidney Lumet	Lance Henriksen	Serpico (1973), Dog Day Afternoon (1975), Prince of the City (1981)	
Sidney Lumet	James Mason	NBC Sunday Showcase (1960, episode John Brown's Raid), Playhouse 90 (1960, episode The Hiding Place), The Deadly Affair (1967), The Sea Gull (1968), Child's Play (1972), The Verdict (1982)	
Sidney Lumet	Jack Warden	12 Angry Men (1957), That Kind of Woman (1960), Bye Bye Braverman (1968), The Verdict (1982), Guilty as Sin (1993)	
David Lynch	Michael J. Anderson	Twin Peaks (1990–91), Industrial Symphony No. 1 (1990, concert film), Twin Peaks: Fire Walk with Me (1992), Mulholland Drive (2001)	
David Lynch	Frances Bay	Blue Velvet (1986), Twin Peaks (1990-91), Wild at Heart (1990), Twin Peaks: Fire Walk with Me (1992)	
David Lynch	Scott Coffey	Wild at Heart (1990), Lost Highway (1997), Mulholland Drive (2001), Rabbits (2002, web series), Inland Empire (2006), Twin Peaks: The Return (2017)	
David Lynch	Laura Dern	Blue Velvet (1986), Wild at Heart (1990), Industrial Symphony No. 1 (1990, concert film), Inland Empire (2006), Twin Peaks: The Return (2017)	
David Lynch	Sherilyn Fenn	Twin Peaks (1990–91), Wild at Heart (1990), Twin Peaks: The Return (2017)	
David Lynch	David Patrick Kelly	Twin Peaks (1990–91), Wild at Heart (1990), Twin Peaks: The Return (2017)	
David Lynch	Freddie Jones	The Elephant Man (1980), Dune (1984), Wild at Heart (1990), On the Air (1992, TV),Hotel Room (1993, episode "Tricks")	
David Lynch	Laura Harring	Mulholland Drive (2001), Rabbits (2002, web series), Inland Empire (2006)	
David Lynch	Sheryl Lee	Wild at Heart (1990), Twin Peaks (1990-91), Twin Peaks: Fire Walk with Me (1992), Twin Peaks: The Return (2017)	
David Lynch	Kyle MacLachlan	Dune (1984), Blue Velvet (1986), Twin Peaks (1990–91), Twin Peaks: Fire Walk with Me (1992), Twin Peaks: The Return (2017)	
David Lynch	Everett McGill	Dune (1984), Twin Peaks (1990-91), The Straight Story (1999), Twin Peaks: The Return (2017)	
David Lynch	Jack Nance	Eraserhead (1977), Dune (1984), Blue Velvet (1986), The Cowboy and the Frenchman (1988, short), Wild at Heart (1990), Twin Peaks (1990-91), Twin Peaks: Fire Walk with Me (1992, scene deleted), Lost Highway (1997)	
David Lynch	Harry Dean Stanton	The Cowboy and the Frenchman (1988, short), Wild at Heart (1990), Twin Peaks: Fire Walk with Me (1992), Hotel Room (1993, episode "Tricks"), The Straight Story (1999), Rabbits (2002, web series), Inland Empire (2006), Twin Peaks: The Return (2017)	
David Lynch	Naomi Watts	Mulholland Drive (2001), Rabbits (2002, web series), Inland Empire (2006), Twin Peaks: The Return (2017)	
David Lynch	Grace Zabriskie	Twin Peaks (1990–91), Wild at Heart (1990), Twin Peaks: Fire Walk with Me (1992), Inland Empire (2006), Twin Peaks: The Return (2017)	

== List of collaborations (M-O) ==
Director	Actor	Films	Ref.
John Madden	Judi Dench	Mrs Brown (1997), Shakespeare in Love (1998), The Best Exotic Marigold Hotel (2012), The Second Best Exotic Marigold Hotel (2015)	
John Madden	Tom Wilkinson	Shakespeare in Love (1998), The Debt (2010), The Best Exotic Marigold Hotel (2012)	
Anthony Mann	James Stewart	Winchester '73 (1950), Bend of the River (1952), The Glenn Miller Story (1953), The Naked Spur (1953), Thunder Bay (1953), The Far Country (1954), The Man from Laramie (1955), Strategic Air Command (1955)	
Martin McDonagh	Colin Farrell	In Bruges (2008), Seven Psychopaths (2012), The Banshees of Inisherin (2022)	
Martin McDonagh	Sam Rockwell	Seven Psychopaths (2012), Three Billboards Outside Ebbing, Missouri (2017), Wild Horse Nine (2026)	
Martin McDonagh	Željko Ivanek	In Bruges (2008), Seven Psychopaths (2012), Three Billboards Outside Ebbing, Missouri (2017)	
Martin McDonagh	Brendan Gleeson	Six Shooter (2004, short), In Bruges (2008), The Banshees of Inisherin (2022)	
Adam McKay	Steve Carell	Anchorman: The Legend of Ron Burgundy (2004), Wake Up, Ron Burgundy: The Lost Movie (2004), Anchorman 2: The Legend Continues (2013), The Big Short (2015), Vice (2018)	
Adam McKay	Will Ferrell	Anchorman: The Legend of Ron Burgundy (2004), Wake Up, Ron Burgundy: The Lost Movie (2004), Talladega Nights: The Ballad of Ricky Bobby (2006), Step Brothers (2008), Funny or Die Presents (2010, TV), The Other Guys (2010), Anchorman 2: The Legend Continues (2013)	
Adam McKay	Seth Rogen	Anchorman: The Legend of Ron Burgundy (2004), Wake Up, Ron Burgundy: The Lost Movie (2004), Step Brothers (2008, cameo)	
Christopher McQuarrie	Tom Cruise	Jack Reacher (2012), Mission: Impossible – Rogue Nation (2015), Mission: Impossible – Fallout (2018), Mission: Impossible – Dead Reckoning Part One (2023), Mission: Impossible – The Final Reckoning (2025)	
Steve McQueen	Michael Fassbender	Hunger (2008), Shame (2011), 12 Years a Slave (2013)	
Terrence Malick	Cate Blanchett	Knight of Cups (2015), Voyage of Time (2016, voice only), Song to Song (2017)	
James Mangold	Hugh Jackman	Kate & Leopold (2001), The Wolverine (2013), Logan (2017)	
Michael Mann	Jamie Foxx	Ali (2001), Collateral (2004), Miami Vice (2006)	
Michael Mann	Bruce McGill	The Insider (1999), Ali (2001), Collateral (2004)	
Sam Mendes	Daniel Craig	Road to Perdition (2002), Skyfall (2012), Spectre (2015)	
Phil Lord and Christopher Miller	Jonah Hill	The Lego Movie (2014), 21 Jump Street (2012), 22 Jump Street (2014)	
Phil Lord and Christopher Miller	Channing Tatum	The Lego Movie (2014), 21 Jump Street (2012), 22 Jump Street (2014)	
Anthony Minghella	Jude Law	The Talented Mr. Ripley (1999), Cold Mountain (2003), Breaking and Entering (2006)	
Jeff Nichols	Michael Shannon	Take Shelter (2011), Mud (2012), Midnight Special (2016), Loving (2016), The Bikeriders (2023)	
Mike Nichols	Annette Bening	Postcards from the Edge (1990), Regarding Henry (1991), What Planet Are You From? (2000)	
Mike Nichols	Jack Nicholson	Carnal Knowledge (1971), The Fortune (1975), Heartburn (1986), Wolf (1994)	
Mike Nichols	Meryl Streep	Silkwood (1983), Heartburn (1986), Postcards from the Edge (1990), Angels in America (2003, TV)	
Mike Nichols	Emma Thompson	Primary Colors (1998), Wit (2001, TV), Angels in America (2003, TV)	
Christopher Nolan	Christian Bale	Batman Begins (2005), The Prestige (2006), The Dark Knight (2008), The Dark Knight Rises (2012)	
Christopher Nolan	Michael Caine	Batman Begins (2005), The Prestige (2006), The Dark Knight (2008), Inception (2010), The Dark Knight Rises (2012), Interstellar (2014), Dunkirk (2017, uncredited voice), Tenet (2020)	
Christopher Nolan	Cillian Murphy	Batman Begins (2005), The Dark Knight (2008), Inception (2010), The Dark Knight Rises (2012), Dunkirk (2017), Oppenheimer (2023)	
Christopher Nolan	Tom Hardy	Inception (2010), The Dark Knight Rises (2012), Dunkirk (2017)	
Christopher Nolan	Gary Oldman	Batman Begins (2005), The Dark Knight (2008), The Dark Knight Rises (2012), Oppenheimer (2023)	
Christopher Nolan	Kenneth Branagh	Dunkirk (2017), Tenet (2020), Oppenheimer (2023)	
Christopher Nolan	Matt Damon	Interstellar (2014), Oppenheimer (2023), The Odyssey (2026)	
Christopher Nolan	Anne Hathaway	The Dark Knight Rises (2012), Interstellar (2014), The Odyssey (2026)	
Christopher Nolan	John Nolan	Following (1998), Batman Begins (2005), The Dark Knight Rises (2012), Dunkirk (2017)	
Yasujiro Ozu	Setsuko Hara	Late Spring (1949), Early Summer (1951), Tokyo Story (1953), Tokyo Twilight (1957), Late Autumn (1960), The End of Summer (1961)	
Yasujiro Ozu	Daisuke Katō	Bloody Spear at Mount Fuji (1955), Early Spring (1956), The End of Summer (1961), An Autumn Afternoon (1962), Radishes and Carrots (1965)	
Yasujiro Ozu	Seiji Miyaguchi	Early Summer (1951), Early Spring (1956), Tokyo Twilight (1957)	
Yasujiro Ozu	Chishū Ryū	52 different films between 1928 and 1962	

== List of collaborations (P-R) ==
Director	Actor	Films	Ref.
Wolfgang Petersen	Jürgen Prochnow	Die Konsequenz (1977, TV), Das Boot (1981), Air Force One (1997)	
Todd Phillips	Bradley Cooper	The Hangover (2009), The Hangover Part II (2011), The Hangover Part III (2013), War Dogs (2016)	
Todd Phillips	Juliette Lewis	Old School (2003), Starsky & Hutch (2004), Due Date (2010)	
Todd Phillips	Zach Galifianakis	The Hangover (2009), Due Date (2010), The Hangover Part II (2011), The Hangover Part III (2013)	
Roman Polanski	Emmanuelle Seigner	Frantic (1988), Bitter Moon (1992), The Ninth Gate (1999), Venus in Fur (2013), Based on a True Story (2017), An Officer and a Spy (2019)	
Sydney Pollack	Dabney Coleman	The Slender Thread (1965), This Property Is Condemned (1966), The Scalphunters (1969), Tootsie (1982)	
Sydney Pollack	Robert Redford	This Property Is Condemned (1966), Jeremiah Johnson (1972), The Way We Were (1973), Three Days of the Condor (1975), The Electric Horseman (1979), Out of Africa (1985), Havana (1990)	
Sam Raimi	Bruce Campbell	14 different films from 1977 to the present.	
Sam Raimi	Ted Raimi	14 different films from 1976 to the present.	
Sam Raimi	Dan Hicks	Evil Dead II (1987), Darkman (1990), Army of Darkness (1992), Spider-Man 2 (2004), Oz the Great and Powerful (2013)	
Sam Raimi	J. K. Simmons	For Love of the Game (1999), The Gift (2000), Spider-Man (2002), Spider-Man 2 (2004), Spider-Man 3 (2007), The Black Ghiandola (2017, short)	
Sam Raimi	Scott Spiegel	20 different films from 1975 to present.	
Sam Raimi	Emma Raimi	Spider-Man 3 (2007), Drag Me to Hell (2009), Oz: The Great and Powerful (2013), Send Help (2026)	
Sam Raimi	Bridget Hoffman	Crimewave (1985), Darkman (1990, voice only), Army of Darkness (1992, uncredited), Drag Me to Hell (2009), Doctor Strange in the Multiverse of Madness (2022, voice only)	
Sam Raimi	Chelcie Ross	A Simple Plan (1998), The Gift (2000), Drag Me to Hell (2009)	
Sam Raimi	Timothy Patrick Quill	10 different films from 1976 to 2013.	
Sam Raimi	Ellen Sandweiss	Within the Woods (1979, short), The Evil Dead (1981), Oz: The Great and Powerful (2013)	
Sam Raimi	James Franco	Spider-Man (2002), Spider-Man 2 (2004), Spider-Man 3 (2007), Oz: The Great and Powerful (2013)	
Sam Raimi	Rosemary Harris	The Gift (2000), Spider-Man (2002), Spider-Man 2 (2004), Spider-Man 3 (2007)	
Harold Ramis	Eugene Levy	National Lampoon's Vacation (1983), Club Paradise (1986), Multiplicity (1996)	
Brett Ratner	Ken Leung	Rush Hour (1998), The Family Man (2000), Red Dragon (2002), X-Men: The Last Stand (2006)	
Brett Ratner	Chris Tucker	Money Talks (1997), Rush Hour (1998), Rush Hour 2 (2001), Rush Hour 3 (2007)	
Matt Reeves	Andy Serkis	Dawn of the Planet of the Apes (2014), War for the Planet of the Apes (2017), The Batman (2022), The Batman: Part II (2028)	
Nicolas Winding Refn	Mads Mikkelsen	Pusher (1996), Bleeder (1999), Pusher II (2004), Valhalla Rising (2009)	
Kelly Reichardt	Michelle Williams	Wendy and Lucy (2008), Meek's Cutoff (2010), Certain Women (2016), Showing Up (2022)	
Carl Reiner	Steve Martin	The Jerk (1979), Dead Men Don't Wear Plaid (1982), The Man with Two Brains (1983), All of Me (1984)	
Rob Reiner	Kathy Bates	Misery (1990), North (1994), Rumor Has It (2005, uncredited)	
Rob Reiner	Billy Crystal	This Is Spinal Tap (1984), The Princess Bride (1987), When Harry Met Sally... (1989), I Am Your Child (1997, Documentary, Cameo)	
Rob Reiner	Christopher Guest	This Is Spinal Tap (1984), The Princess Bride (1987), A Few Good Men (1992), Spinal Tap II: The End Continues (2025)	
Rob Reiner	Jordan Lund	The American President (1995), Ghosts of Mississippi (1996), Alex & Emma (2003), Rumor Has It (2005), The Bucket List (2007)	
Rob Reiner	Maud Winchester	A Few Good Men (1992), North (1994), The American President (1995)	
Rob Reiner	Jake Reiner	Flipped (2010), Being Charlie (2015), Shock and Awe (2017)	
Rob Reiner	Bruno Kirby	Likely Stories: Vol. 1 (1981, segment: "Tommy Rispoli: A Man and His Music"), This Is Spinal Tap (1984), When Harry Met Sally... (1989)	
Jason Reitman	J. K. Simmons	10 different collaborations between 2005 and 2024.	
Ivan Reitman	Eugene Levy	Foxy Lady (1971), Cannibal Girls (1973), Ghostbusters II (1989, scene deleted)	
Ivan Reitman	Bill Murray	Meatballs (1979), Stripes (1981), Ghostbusters (1984), Ghostbusters II (1989)	
Ivan Reitman	Harold Ramis	Stripes (1981), Ghostbusters (1984), Ghostbusters II (1989)	
Ivan Reitman	Arnold Schwarzenegger	Twins (1988), Kindergarten Cop (1990), Dave (1993, cameo as himself), Junior (1994)	
Ivan Reitman	Sigourney Weaver	Ghostbusters (1984), Ghostbusters II (1989), Dave (1993)	
Guy Ritchie	Henry Cavill	The Man from U.N.C.L.E. (2015), The Ministry of Ungentlemanly Warfare (2024), In the Grey (2026)	
Guy Ritchie	Eiza González	The Ministry of Ungentlemanly Warfare (2024), Fountain of Youth (2025), In the Grey (2026)	
Guy Ritchie	Hugh Grant	The Man from U.N.C.L.E. (2015), The Gentlemen (2019), Operation Fortune: Ruse de Guerre (2023), The Ministry of Ungentlemanly Warfare (2024)	
Guy Ritchie	Vinnie Jones	Lock, Stock and Two Smoking Barrels (1998), Snatch (2000), The Gentlemen (2024, TV), Viva La Madness (2026)	
Guy Ritchie	Jude Law	Sherlock Holmes (2009), Sherlock Holmes: A Game of Shadows (2011), King Arthur: Legend of the Sword (2017)	
Guy Ritchie	Eddie Marsan	Sherlock Holmes (2009), Sherlock Holmes: A Game of Shadows (2011), The Gentlemen (2019), Wrath of Man (2021), Operation Fortune: Ruse de Guerre (2023)	
Guy Ritchie	Babs Olusanmokun	Wrath of Man (2021), The Ministry of Ungentlemanly Warfare (2024), Viva La Madness (2026)	
Guy Ritchie	Jason Statham	Lock, Stock and Two Smoking Barrels (1998), Snatch (2000), Revolver (2005), Wrath of Man (2021), Operation Fortune: Ruse de Guerre (2023), Viva La Madness (2026)	
Guy Ritchie	Mark Strong	Revolver (2005), RocknRolla (2008), Sherlock Holmes (2009)	
Guy Ritchie	Jason Wong	The Gentlemen (2019), Wrath of Man (2021), Guy Ritchie's The Covenant (2023), In the Grey (2026)	
Guy Ritchie	Tom Wu	Revolver (2005), King Arthur: Legend of the Sword (2017), The Gentlemen (2019)	
Tim Robbins	Susan Sarandon	Bob Roberts (1992), Dead Man Walking (1995), Cradle Will Rock (1999)	
Robert Rodriguez	Jessica Alba	Sin City (2005), Machete (2010), Spy Kids: All the Time in the World (2011), Machete Kills (2013), Sin City: A Dame to Kill For (2014)	
Robert Rodriguez	Antonio Banderas	Desperado (1995), Four Rooms (1995, Segment: "The Misbehavers"), Spy Kids (2001), Spy Kids 2: The Island of Lost Dreams (2002), Spy Kids 3-D: Game Over (2003), Once Upon a Time in Mexico (2003), Machete Kills (2013)	
Robert Rodriguez	Steve Buscemi	From Dusk till Dawn (1996), Spy Kids 2: The Island of Lost Dreams (2002), Spy Kids 3-D: Game Over (2003)	
Robert Rodriguez	George Clooney	From Dusk till Dawn (1996), Spy Kids (2001), Spy Kids 3-D: Game Over (2003)	
Robert Rodriguez	Jeff Fahey	Planet Terror (2007), Machete (2010), Alita: Battle Angel (2019), Hypnotic (2023)	
Robert Rodriguez	Carlos Gallardo	El Mariachi (1992), Desperado (1995), Planet Terror (2007), Red 11 (2019)	
Robert Rodriguez	Carla Gugino	Spy Kids (2001), Spy Kids 2: The Island of Lost Dreams (2002), Spy Kids 3-D: Game Over (2003), Sin City (2005)	
Robert Rodriguez	Salma Hayek	Roadracers (1994, TV), Desperado (1995), Four Rooms (1995, Segment: "The Misbehavers"), From Dusk till Dawn (1996), The Faculty (1998), Spy Kids 2: The Island of Lost Dreams (2002), Spy Kids 3-D: Game Over (2003), Once Upon a Time in Mexico (2003)	
Robert Rodriguez	Christopher McDonald	The Faculty (1998), Spy Kids 2: The Island of Lost Dreams (2002), We Can Be Heroes (2020)	
Robert Rodriguez	Cheech Marin	Desperado (1995), From Dusk till Dawn (1996), Spy Kids (2001), Spy Kids 2: The Island of Lost Dreams (2002), Spy Kids 3-D: Game Over (2003), Once Upon a Time in Mexico (2003), Grindhouse (2007, "Machete" trailer only), Machete (2010)	
Robert Rodriguez	Robert Patrick	The Faculty (1998), Spy Kids (2001), From Dusk till Dawn: The Series (2014, episode "Blood Runs Thick")	
Robert Rodriguez	Alexa PenaVega	Spy Kids (2001), Spy Kids 2: The Island of Lost Dreams (2002), Spy Kids 3-D: Game Over (2003), Spy Kids: All the Time in the World (2011), Machete Kills (2013), Sin City: A Dame to Kill For (2014)	
Robert Rodriguez	Michelle Rodriguez	Machete (2010), Machete Kills (2013), Alita: Battle Angel (2019, uncredited cameo)	
Robert Rodriguez	Mickey Rourke	Once Upon a Time in Mexico (2003), Sin City (2005), Sin City: A Dame to Kill For (2014)	
Robert Rodriguez	Daryl Sabara	Spy Kids (2001), Spy Kids 2: The Island of Lost Dreams (2002), Spy Kids 3-D: Game Over (2003), Machete (2010), Spy Kids: All the Time in the World (2011)	
Robert Rodriguez	Tom Savini	From Dusk till Dawn (1996), Planet Terror (2007), Machete (2010), Machete Kills (2013)	
Robert Rodriguez	Quentin Tarantino	Desperado (1995), From Dusk till Dawn (1996), Planet Terror (2007)	
Robert Rodriguez	Danny Trejo	12 different collaborations between 1995 and 2014.	
Robert Rodriguez	Patricia Vonne	Desperado (1995), Four Rooms (1995, Segment: "The Misbehavers"), Spy Kids (2001), Sin City (2005), Sin City: A Dame to Kill For (2014), Spy Kids: Armageddon (2023)	
Robert Rodriguez	Bruce Willis	Sin City (2005), Planet Terror (2007), The Black Mamba (2011, short), Sin City: A Dame to Kill For (2014)	
Robert Rodriguez	Elijah Wood	The Faculty (1998), Spy Kids 3-D: Game Over (2003), Sin City (2005)	
Eli Roth	Lorenza Izzo	The Green Inferno (2013), Knock Knock (2015), The House with a Clock in Its Walls (2018)	
David O. Russell	Christian Bale	The Fighter (2010), American Hustle (2013), Amsterdam (2022), Madden (2026)	
David O. Russell	Bradley Cooper	Silver Linings Playbook (2012), American Hustle (2013), Joy (2015)	
David O. Russell	Jennifer Lawrence	Silver Linings Playbook (2012), American Hustle (2013), Joy (2015)	
David O. Russell	Paul Herman	Silver Linings Playbook (2012), American Hustle (2013), Joy (2015)	
David O. Russell	Robert De Niro	Silver Linings Playbook (2012), American Hustle (2013), Joy (2015), Amsterdam (2022)	
David O. Russell	Mark Wahlberg	Three Kings (1999), I Heart Huckabees (2004), The Fighter (2010)	
Russo brothers	Tom Holland	Avengers: Infinity War (2018), Avengers: Endgame (2019), Cherry (2021), Avengers: Doomsday (2026)	
Russo brothers	Chris Evans	Captain America: The Winter Soldier (2014), Captain America: Civil War (2016), Avengers: Infinity War (2018), Avengers: Endgame (2019), The Gray Man (2022), Avengers: Doomsday (2026)	
Russo brothers	Chris Pratt	Avengers: Infinity War (2018), Avengers: Endgame (2019), The Electric State (2025)	
Russo brothers	Anthony Mackie	Captain America: The Winter Soldier (2014), Captain America: Civil War (2016), Avengers: Infinity War (2018), Avengers: Endgame (2019), The Electric State (2025), Avengers: Doomsday (2026), Avengers: Secret Wars (2027)	

== List of collaborations (S-U) ==
Director	Actor	Films	Ref.
Julian Schnabel	Willem Dafoe	Basquiat (1996), Miral (2010), At Eternity's Gate (2018)	
Paul Schrader	Willem Dafoe	Light Sleeper (1992), Affliction (1997), Auto Focus (2002), The Walker (2007), Adam Resurrected (2008), Dog Eat Dog (2016), The Card Counter (2021)	
Joel Schumacher	Colin Farrell	Tigerland (2000), Phone Booth (2002), Veronica Guerin (2003)	
Joel Schumacher	Kiefer Sutherland	The Lost Boys (1987), Flatliners (1990), A Time to Kill (1996), Phone Booth (2002), Twelve (2010, voice only)	
Martin Scorsese	Robert De Niro	11 different films from 1973 to 2023.	
Martin Scorsese	Leonardo DiCaprio	Gangs of New York (2002), The Aviator (2004), The Departed (2006), Shutter Island (2010), The Wolf of Wall Street (2013), The Audition (2015, short), Killers of the Flower Moon (2023), What Happens at Night (TBA)	
Martin Scorsese	Harvey Keitel	Who's That Knocking at My Door (1967), Mean Streets (1973), Alice Doesn't Live Here Anymore (1974), Taxi Driver (1976), The Last Temptation of Christ (1988), The Irishman (2019)	
Martin Scorsese	Joe Pesci	Raging Bull (1980), Goodfellas (1990), Casino (1995), The Irishman (2019)	
Martin Scorsese	Frank Vincent	Raging Bull (1980), Goodfellas (1990), Casino (1995)	
Ridley Scott	Russell Crowe	Gladiator (2000), A Good Year (2006), American Gangster (2007), Body of Lies (2008), Robin Hood (2010)	
Ridley Scott	Michael Fassbender	Prometheus (2012), The Counselor (2013), Alien: Covenant (2017)	
Ridley Scott	Željko Ivanek	White Squall (1996), Hannibal (2001), Black Hawk Down (2001), The Last Duel (2021)	
Ridley Scott	Guy Pearce	Prometheus (2012), Alien: Covenant (2017), The Dog Stars (2026)	
Ridley Scott	Sigourney Weaver	Alien (1979), 1492: Conquest of Paradise (1992), Exodus: Gods and Kings (2014)	
Ridley Scott	Benedict Wong	Prometheus (2012), The Martian (2015), The Dog Stars (2026)	
Tony Scott	James Gandolfini	The Last Boy Scout (1991), True Romance (1993), Crimson Tide (1995), The Taking of Pelham 123 (2009), Unstoppable (2010)	
Tony Scott	Val Kilmer	Top Gun (1986), True Romance (1993), Déjà Vu (2006)	
Tony Scott	Christopher Walken	True Romance (1993), Man on Fire (2004), Domino (2005)	
Tony Scott	Denzel Washington	Crimson Tide (1995), Man on Fire (2004), Déjà Vu (2006), The Taking of Pelham 123 (2009), Unstoppable (2010)	
M. Night Shyamalan	Bruce Willis	The Sixth Sense (1999), Unbreakable (2000), Split (2016, uncredited cameo), Glass (2019)	
Jim Sheridan	Daniel Day-Lewis	My Left Foot (1989), In the Name of the Father (1993), The Boxer (1997)	
Bryan Singer	Nicholas Hoult	Jack the Giant Slayer (2013), X-Men: Days of Future Past (2014), X-Men: Apocalypse (2016)	
Bryan Singer	Ian McKellen	Apt Pupil (1998), X-Men (2000), X2 (2003), X-Men: Days of Future Past (2014)	
Bryan Singer	James Marsden	X-Men (2000), X2 (2003), Superman Returns (2006), X-Men: Days of Future Past (2014)	
John Singleton	Tyrese Gibson	Baby Boy (2001), 2 Fast 2 Furious (2003), Four Brothers (2005)	
John Singleton	Regina King	Boyz n the Hood (1991), Poetic Justice (1993), Higher Learning (1995)	
Zack Snyder	Carla Gugino	Watchmen (2009), Sucker Punch (2011), Man of Steel (2013, voice only), Batman v Superman: Dawn of Justice (2016, voice only), Zack Snyder's Justice League (2021, voice only)	
Zack Snyder	Ray Fisher	Batman v Superman: Dawn of Justice (2016, cameo), Zack Snyder's Justice League (2021, voice only), Rebel Moon: Part One – A Child of Fire (2023), Rebel Moon – Part Two: The Scargiver (2024)	
Zack Snyder	Jena Malone	Sucker Punch (2011), Batman v Superman: Dawn of Justice (2016, Ultimate Edition only), Rebel Moon: Part One – A Child of Fire (2023)	
Zack Snyder	Stuart Martin	Rebel Moon: Part One – A Child of Fire (2023), Rebel Moon – Part Two: The Scargiver (2024), Twilight of the Gods (2024, 2 episodes), The Last Photograph (2026)	
Zack Snyder	Malcolm Scott	Watchmen (2009), Sucker Punch (2011), Man of Steel (2013)	
Steven Soderbergh	George Clooney	Out of Sight (1998), Ocean's Eleven (2001), Solaris (2002), Ocean's Twelve (2004), The Good German (2006), Ocean's Thirteen (2007)	
Steven Soderbergh	Matt Damon	Ocean's Eleven (2001), Ocean's Twelve (2004), Ocean's Thirteen (2007), Che (2008), The Informant! (2009), Contagion (2011), Behind the Candelabra (2013, TV), Unsane (2018, Cameo), No Sudden Move (2021, uncredited cameo)	
Steven Soderbergh	Channing Tatum	Haywire (2011), Magic Mike (2012), Side Effects (2013), Logan Lucky (2017), Magic Mike's Last Dance (2023)	
Steven Soderbergh	Don Cheadle	Out of Sight (1998), Traffic (2000), Ocean's Eleven (2001), Ocean's Twelve (2004), Ocean's Thirteen (2007), No Sudden Move (2021)	
Steven Soderbergh	Benicio del Toro	Traffic (2000), Che (2008), No Sudden Move (2021)	
Steven Soderbergh	Michael Douglas	Traffic (2000), Haywire (2011), Behind the Candelabra (2013, TV)	
Steven Soderbergh	Albert Finney	Erin Brokovich (2000), Traffic (2000), Ocean's Twelve (2004)	
Steven Soderbergh	Elliott Gould	Ocean's Eleven (2001), Ocean's Twelve (2004), Ocean's Thirteen (2007), Contagion (2011)	
Steven Soderbergh	Topher Grace	Traffic (2000), Ocean's Eleven (2001), Ocean's Twelve (2004)	
Steven Soderbergh	Luis Guzmán	Out of Sight (1998), The Limey (1999), Traffic (2000)	
Steven Soderbergh	Eddie Jemison	Schizopolis (1996, uncredited), Ocean's Eleven (2001), Ocean's Twelve (2004), Ocean's Thirteen (2007), The Informant! (2009), Behind the Candelabra (2013, TV)	
Steven Soderbergh	Brad Pitt	Ocean's Eleven (2001), Full Frontal (2002), Ocean's Twelve (2004), Ocean's Thirteen (2007)	
Steven Soderbergh	Julia Roberts	Erin Brokovich (2000), Ocean's Eleven (2001), Full Frontal (2002), Ocean's Twelve (2004)	
Steven Soderbergh	Catherine Zeta-Jones	Traffic (2000), Ocean's Twelve (2004), Side Effects (2013)	
Steven Spielberg	Tom Hanks	Saving Private Ryan (1998), Catch Me If You Can (2002), The Terminal (2004), A Timeless Call (2008, short, cameo only), Bridge of Spies (2015), The Post (2017)	
Steven Spielberg	Richard Dreyfuss	Jaws (1975), Close Encounters of the Third Kind (1977), Always (1989)	
Steven Spielberg	Mark Rylance	Bridge of Spies (2015), The BFG (2016), Ready Player One (2018)	
Steven Spielberg	Geno Silva	1941 (1979), The Lost World: Jurassic Park (1997), Amistad (1997)	
Steven Spielberg	Mark Ivanir	Schindler's List (1993), The Terminal (2004), The Adventures of Tintin (2011, voice only)	
Steven Spielberg	Sasha Spielberg	The Terminal (2004), Munich (2005), Indiana Jones and the Kingdom of the Crystal Skull (2008), The Post (2017)	
Steven Spielberg	Harrison Ford	Raiders of the Lost Ark (1981), E.T. the Extra-Terrestrial (1982, scene deleted), Indiana Jones and the Temple of Doom (1984), Indiana Jones and the Last Crusade (1989), Indiana Jones and the Kingdom of the Crystal Skull (2008)	
Oliver Stone	Willem Dafoe	Platoon (1986), Born on the Fourth of July (1989), White Lies (2026)	
Oliver Stone	Michael Douglas	Wall Street (1987), Wall Street: Money Never Sleeps (2010), White Lies (2026)	
Oliver Stone	Tommy Lee Jones	JFK (1991), Heaven & Earth (1993), Natural Born Killers (1994)	
Oliver Stone	John C. McGinley	Platoon (1986), Wall Street (1987), Talk Radio (1988), Born on the Fourth of July (1989), Nixon (1995), World Trade Center (2006, uncredited)	
Oliver Stone	Charlie Sheen	Platoon (1986), Wall Street (1987), Wall Street: Money Never Sleeps (2010)	
Oliver Stone	Frank Whaley	Born on the Fourth of July (1989), The Doors (1991), JFK (1991), World Trade Center (2006)	
Oliver Stone	Michael Wincott	Talk Radio (1988), Born on the Fourth of July (1989), The Doors (1991)	
Oliver Stone	James Woods	Salvador (1986), Nixon (1995), Any Given Sunday (1999)	
Quentin Tarantino	Samuel L. Jackson	Pulp Fiction (1994), Jackie Brown (1997), Kill Bill: Volume 2 (2004), Inglourious Basterds (2009, uncredited voice), Django Unchained (2012), The Hateful Eight (2015)	
Quentin Tarantino	Tim Roth	Reservoir Dogs (1992), Pulp Fiction (1994), Four Rooms (1995), The Hateful Eight (2015), Once Upon a Time in Hollywood (2019, scene deleted)	
Quentin Tarantino	Michael Madsen	Reservoir Dogs (1992), Kill Bill: Volume 1 (2003), Kill Bill: Volume 2 (2004), The Hateful Eight (2015), Once Upon a Time in Hollywood (2019)	
Quentin Tarantino	Harvey Keitel	Reservoir Dogs (1992), Pulp Fiction (1994), Inglourious Basterds (2009, uncredited voice)	
Quentin Tarantino	Uma Thurman	Pulp Fiction (1994), Kill Bill: Volume 1 (2003), Kill Bill: Volume 2 (2004)	
Quentin Tarantino	Zoë Bell	Kill Bill: Volume 1 (2003, stunt work), Kill Bill: Volume 2 (2004, stunt work), Death Proof (2007), Inglourious Basterds (2009, stunt work), Django Unchained (2012), The Hateful Eight (2015), Once Upon a Time in Hollywood (2019)	
Quentin Tarantino	Michael Bowen	Jackie Brown (1997), Kill Bill: Volume 1 (2003), Django Unchained (2012)	
Quentin Tarantino	Kurt Russell	Death Proof (2007), The Hateful Eight (2015), Once Upon a Time in Hollywood (2019)	
Quentin Tarantino	Bruce Dern	Django Unchained (2012), The Hateful Eight (2015), Once Upon a Time in Hollywood (2019)	
Quentin Tarantino	Walton Goggins	Django Unchained (2012), The Hateful Eight (2015), Once Upon a Time in Hollywood (2019)	
Quentin Tarantino	Michael Parks	Kill Bill: Volume 1 (2003), Kill Bill: Volume 2 (2004), Death Proof (2007), Django Unchained (2012)	
Quentin Tarantino	James Parks	Kill Bill: Volume 1 (2003), Death Proof (2007), Django Unchained (2012), The Hateful Eight (2015)	
Rawson Marshall Thurber	Dwayne Johnson	Central Intelligence (2016), Skyscraper (2018), Red Notice (2021)	
Joachim Trier	Renate Reinsve	Oslo, 31 August (2011), The Worst Person in the World (2021), Sentimental Value (2025)	
François Truffaut	Jean-Pierre Léaud	The 400 Blows (1959), Antoine and Colette (1962, short), Stolen Kisses (1968), Bed and Board (1970), Two English Girls (1971), Day for Night (1973), Love on the Run (1979)	

== List of collaborations (V-Z) ==
Director	Actor	Films	Ref.
Gus Van Sant	Casey Affleck	To Die For (1995), Good Will Hunting (1997), Gerry (2002)	
Gus Van Sant	Matt Damon	Good Will Hunting (1997), Finding Forrester (2000), Gerry (2002), Promised Land (2012)	
Gus Van Sant	Udo Kier	My Own Private Idaho (1991), Even Cowgirls Get the Blues (1993), Don't Worry, He Won't Get Far on Foot (2018)	
Gus Van Sant	Keanu Reeves	My Own Private Idaho (1991), Even Cowgirls Get the Blues (1993), My Own Private River (2011)	
Matthew Vaughn	Jason Flemyng	Layer Cake (2004), Stardust (2007), Kick-Ass (2010), X-Men: First Class (2011)	
Matthew Vaughn	Dexter Fletcher	Layer Cake (2004), Stardust (2007), Kick-Ass (2010)	
Matthew Vaughn	Corey Johnson	Kick-Ass (2010), X-Men: First Class (2011), Kingsman: The Secret Service (2014)	
Matthew Vaughn	Mark Strong	Stardust (2007), Kick-Ass (2010), Kingsman: The Secret Service (2014), Kingsman: The Golden Circle (2017)	
Gore Verbinski	Johnny Depp	Pirates of the Caribbean: The Curse of the Black Pearl (2003), Pirates of the Caribbean: Dead Man's Chest (2006), Pirates of the Caribbean: At World's End (2007), Rango (2011), The Lone Ranger (2013)	
Denis Villeneuve	Dave Bautista	Blade Runner 2049 (2017), Dune (2021), Dune: Part Two (2024)	
Denis Villeneuve	Josh Brolin	Sicario (2015), Dune (2021), Dune: Part Two (2024), Dune: Part Three (2026)	
Denis Villeneuve	David Dastmalchian	Prisoners (2013), Blade Runner 2049 (2017), Dune (2021)	
Josef von Sternberg	Marlene Dietrich	The Blue Angel (1930), Morocco (1930), Dishonored (1931), Shanghai Express (1932), Blonde Venus (1932), The Scarlet Empress (1934), The Devil is a Woman (1935)	
Lars von Trier	Willem Dafoe	Manderlay (2005), Antichrist (2009), Nymphomaniac (2013)	
Lars von Trier	Udo Kier	Epidemic (1987), Europa (1991), Breaking the Waves (1996), Dancer in the Dark (2000), Dogville (2003), Manderlay (2005), Melancholia (2011), Nymphomaniac (2013)	
The Wachowskis	Bae Doona	Speed Racer (2008), Cloud Atlas (2012), Sense8 (2015–17)	
The Wachowskis	Kick Gurry	Speed Racer (2008), Jupiter Ascending (2015), Sense8 (2015–17)	
The Wachowskis	Joe Pantoliano	Bound (1996), The Matrix (1999), Sense8 (2015–17)	
The Wachowskis	Hugo Weaving	The Matrix (1999), The Matrix Reloaded (2003), The Matrix Revolutions (2003), Enter the Matrix (2003, video game), Cloud Atlas (2012)	
Taika Waititi	Rachel House	Eagle vs Shark (2007), Boy (2010), Hunt for the Wilderpeople (2016), Thor: Ragnarok (2017), Our Flag Means Death (2022-2023), Next Goal Wins (2023), Time Bandits (2024, TV)	
Taika Waititi	Luke Hemsworth	Thor: Ragnarok (2017), Thor: Love and Thunder (2022), Next Goal Wins (2023)	
Taika Waititi	Sam Neill	Hunt for the Wilderpeople (2016), Thor: Ragnarok (2017), Thor: Love and Thunder (2022)	
James Wan	Patrick Wilson	Insidious (2010), The Conjuring (2013), Insidious: Chapter 2 (2013), The Conjuring 2 (2016), Aquaman (2018), Aquaman and the Lost Kingdom (2023)	
Joss Whedon	Nathan Fillion	Buffy the Vampire Slayer (2003, episode "Chosen"), Firefly (2001–02), Serenity (2005), Dr. Horrible's Sing-Along Blog (2008)	
Adam Wingard	Dan Stevens	The Guest (2014), Godzilla x Kong: The New Empire (2024), Onslaught (2026)	
John Woo	Tony Leung Chiu-wai	Bullet in the Head (1990), Hard Boiled (1992), Red Cliff (2008)	
John Woo	Leslie Cheung	A Better Tomorrow (1986), A Better Tomorrow II (1987), Once a Thief (1991)	
John Woo	Shing Fui-On	The Young Dragons (1974), A Better Tomorrow (1986), A Better Tomorrow II (1987), Just Heroes (1989), The Killer (1989)	
John Woo	Dean Shek	The Young Dragons (1974), Laughing Times (1980), A Better Tomorrow II (1987)	
John Woo	Kenneth Tsang	A Better Tomorrow (1986), A Better Tomorrow II (1987), The Killer (1989), Once a Thief (1991)	
John Woo	Chow Yun-Fat	A Better Tomorrow (1986), A Better Tomorrow II (1987), The Killer (1989), Once a Thief (1991), Hard Boiled (1992)	
Edgar Wright	Simon Pegg	Spaced (1999-2001), Shaun of the Dead (2004), Hot Fuzz (2007), Grindhouse (Don't fake trailer, 2007), The World's End (2013)	
Edgar Wright	Nick Frost	Spaced (1999-2001), Shaun of the Dead (2004), Hot Fuzz (2007), Grindhouse (Don't fake trailer, 2007), The World's End (2013)	
Edgar Wright	Martin Freeman	Shaun of the Dead (2004), Hot Fuzz (2007), The World's End (2013)	
Edgar Wright	Bill Nighy	Shaun of the Dead (2004), Hot Fuzz (2007), The World's End (2013)	
Edgar Wright	Rafe Spall	Shaun of the Dead (2004), Hot Fuzz (2007), Grindhouse (Don't fake trailer, 2007), The World's End (2013)	
Joe Wright	Keira Knightley	Pride & Prejudice (2005), Atonement (2007), Anna Karenina (2012)	
Joe Wright	Tom Hollander	Pride & Prejudice (2005), The Soloist (2009), Hanna (2011)	
David Yates	Jim Broadbent	The Young Visiters (2003, TV), Harry Potter and the Half-Blood Prince (2009), Harry Potter and the Deathly Hallows – Part 2 (2011), The Legend of Tarzan (2016)	
Corey Yuen	Jet Li	Fong Sai-yuk (1993), Fong Sai-yuk II (1993), The Bodyguard from Beijing (1994), The New Legend of Shaolin (1994), My Father Is a Hero (1995)	
Robert Zemeckis	Tom Hanks	Forrest Gump (1994), Cast Away (2000), The Polar Express (2004), Pinocchio (2022), Here (2024)	
Robert Zemeckis	Christopher Lloyd	Amazing Stories (1985, episode "Go to the Head of the Class"), Back to the Future (1985), Who Framed Roger Rabbit (1988), Back to the Future Part II (1989), Back to the Future Part III (1990)	
Robert Zemeckis	Marc McClure	I Wanna Hold Your Hand (1978), Used Cars (1980), Back to the Future (1985), Back to the Future Part II (1989, scene deleted), Back to the Future Part III (1990)	
Robert Zemeckis	Wendie Jo Sperber	I Wanna Hold Your Hand (1978), Used Cars (1980), Back to the Future (1985), Back to the Future Part III (1990)	
Robert Zemeckis	Robin Wright	Forrest Gump (1994), Beowulf (2007), A Christmas Carol (2009), Here (2024)	
Robert Zemeckis	Leslie Zemeckis	The Polar Express (2004), Beowulf (2007), A Christmas Carol (2009), Welcome to Marwen (2018), Here (2024)	
Edward Zwick	Denzel Washington	Glory (1989), Courage Under Fire (1996), The Siege (1998)	

== See also ==
- Martin Scorsese and Robert De Niro
- Martin Scorsese and Leonardo DiCaprio
