= The Affairs of Dobie Gillis =

1953 film by Don Weis

- Theatrical release poster
- Directed by: Don Weis
- Screenplay by: Max Shulman
- Based on: The Many Loves of Dobie Gillis; 1951 short stories by Max Shulman
- Produced by: Arthur M. Loew Jr.
- Starring: Debbie Reynolds; Bobby Van; Barbara Ruick; Bob Fosse; Hanley Stafford; Hans Conried
- Cinematography: William C. Mellor
- Edited by: Conrad A. Nervig
- Music by: Musical Direction/Supervision; Jeff Alexander; Choreography; Alex Romero
- Production company: Metro-Goldwyn-Mayer
- Distributed by: Loew's Inc.
- Release date: 14 August 1953 (US)
- Running time: 72 minutes
- Country: United States
- Language: English
- Box office: $577,000

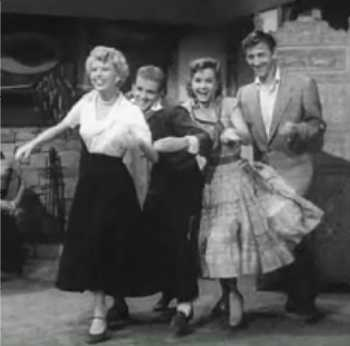
L-R: Barbara Ruick, Bob Fosse, Debbie Reynolds, and Bobby Van

The Affairs of Dobie Gillis is a 1953 American comedy musical film directed by Don Weis. The film is based on the short stories by Max Shulman collected as The Many Loves of Dobie Gillis (also the title of the later television series). Bobby Van played Gillis in this musical version, co-starring with Debbie Reynolds and Bob Fosse.

The Affairs of Dobie Gillis was filmed in black and white, MGM's first non-color musical film in years. It was Fosse's technical screen debut, as it was his second film but the first to be released.

== Plot ==
At Grainbelt University, a Midwestern university, freshmen Dobie Gillis (Bobby Van) and Charlie Trask (Bob Fosse) court students Pansy Hammer (Debbie Reynolds) and Lorna Ellingboe (Barbara Ruick). They attend the same courses because Lorna is pursuing Dobie, who is pursuing Pansy, and Charlie is pursuing Lorna. Pansy is studious, and is encouraged by her father George (Hanley Stafford) to "learn learn learn" and "work work work," while Dobie, Charlie and Lorna only want to have fun.

Pansy's father can't stand Dobie and does everything in his power to keep them apart. Dobie and Pansy manage to blow up the chemistry lab, but Dobie is spared expulsion because the officious English professor Pomfritt (Hans Conried) is misled to believe that the feckless Gillis is a literary genius.

Pansy is sent to a school in New York after the chemistry lab incident. With the help of Charlie and Lorna, Dobie figures out a way of getting Pansy back to Grainbelt.

== Cast ==
- Bobby Van as Dobie Gillis, a freshman
- Debbie Reynolds as Pansy Hammer
- Bob Fosse as Charlie Trask, a freshman
- Barbara Ruick as Lorna
- Hans Conried as Prof. Pomfritt
- Hanley Stafford as George Hammer, Pansy's father
- Lurene Tuttle as Mrs. Eleanor Hammer
- Charles Lane as Chemistry Professor Obispo
- Archer MacDonald as Harry Dorcas
- Kathleen Freeman as 'Happy Stella' Kowalski
- Almira Sessions as Aunt Naomi
- Charles Halton as Dean (Granbelt University)

== Production ==
Carleton Carpenter was tentatively cast in the film, along with Reynolds, Van and Ruick, after MGM bought Shulman's stories. The original plan was to turn the film into a series, along the lines of the Andy Hardy and Dr. Kildare movie franchise, if the film was successful.

== Release ==
The film was Bob Fosse's second feature production, after Give a Girl a Break, though The Affairs of Dobie Gillis was the first to be released, receiving a theatrical release in August 1953; Give a Girl a Break released in December later that same year.

=== Box office ===
According to MGM records the film earned $423,000 in the US and Canada and $154,000 elsewhere, resulting in a loss of $131,000.

=== Critical reaction ===
At the time of release, Barbara Wilson of the Philadelphia Inquirer called the film "agreeable" and cited Van's "rubber-legged grace, reminiscent of Ray Bolger. The Los Angeles Times's John Scott called it a "lightweight, lightheaded comedy," and said the Max Shulman screenplay "is, shall we say, charitably, innocuous,"

Win Fanning, writing for the Pittsburgh Post-Gazette, called the film "a small musical" that was "hung on the weakest imaginable plot," and said that it was "an insignificant piece of fluff" that was "hardly up to the standards of its principals, all of whom seem entirely too attractive and talented to be bothering with such nonsense." But the review credited the actors and director with nevertheless pulling off "a presentable entertainment."

== Legacy ==
Bob Fosse's biographers have dismissed the film, his movie acting debut, as "a minor-league comedy with a few old songs thrown in" and as "a movie destined to achieve a Zenlike oblivion."

In his book Big Deal: Bob Fosse and Dance in the American Musical, author Kevin Winkler observes that in the "You Can't Do Wrong Doin' Right" number, choreographed by Alex Romero, Fosse displays the explosive style for which he later became known. He observes that while Bobby Van tap dances as well as Fosse in that number, Van "dances only with his feet while Fosse dances with his whole body." However, in her book The Movie Musical!, film historian Jeanine Basinger writes that while the film comes close to accomplishing the "Fosse style," his "herky-jerky movements and weirdly twisted body positions were overshadowed by the emerging stardom of perky Debbie Reynolds and hot-tapping Bobby Van."

Fosse was disillusioned by his experience making Dobie Gillis and Give a Girl a Break, which was filmed earlier but released after Dobie Gillis. Noting that his screen time was far less in Dobie than in the other film, Fosse later remarked, "My parts were getting smaller. I knew what that meant."

== Songs ==
- "You Can't Do Wrong Doin' Right"
  - Written by Al Rinker and Floyd Huddleston
  - Performed by Barbara Ruick, Bob Fosse, Debbie Reynolds and Bobby Van
- "I'm Thru with Love"
  - Music by Matty Malneck and Fud Livingston
  - Lyrics by Gus Kahn
  - Performed by Bobby Van
- "All I Do Is Dream of You"
  - Music by Nacio Herb Brown
  - Lyrics by Arthur Freed
  - Performed by Debbie Reynolds and Bobby Van
  - Played during the opening credits and often throughout the picture
- "Believe Me, If All Those Endearing Young Charms"
  - Traditional Irish folk song, with lyrics by Thomas Moore
  - Performed by Debbie Reynolds and Barbara Ruick
- "Red River Valley (song)"
  - Traditional
  - Played by the band during the square dance
