= Apache War Smoke =

1952 film by Harold F. Kress

- Film poster
- Directed by: Harold F. Kress
- Written by: Jerry Davis
- Based on: "Stage Station" by Ernest Haycox
- Produced by: Hayes Goetz
- Starring: Gilbert Roland; Glenda Farrell; Robert Horton
- Cinematography: John Alton
- Edited by: Newell P. Kimlin
- Music by: Alberto Colombo
- Production company: Metro-Goldwyn-Mayer
- Distributed by: Metro-Goldwyn-Mayer
- Release date: September 25, 1952
- Running time: 67 minutes
- Country: United States
- Language: English
- Budget: $382,000
- Box office: $797,000

Apache War Smoke is a 1952 American Western film directed by Harold F. Kress and starring Gilbert Roland, Glenda Farrell and Robert Horton. The film is based on the 1939 short story "Stage Station" by Ernest Haycox. It was released by MGM on September 25, 1952.

== Plot ==
Tom Herrera, the head of a stagecoach station in New Mexico, prepares to defend against an attack by an Apache party seeking revenge for the killing of several Indians by an outlaw. When a stagecoach arrives at the station with passengers Nancy Dekker, Cyril R. Snowden, Lorraine Sayburn and Fanny Webson, they are stranded at the station with Tom and his outlaw father Peso Herrera, the most wanted outlaw in the country. Peso wants the gold contained in the casket of the stagecoach. Tom, knowing his father's intentions, seizes his guns as a precaution. As the Apaches begin their attack, suspicion is immediately cast on Peso as the reason for it. Tom and Fanny defend Peso when others in the station suggest that they offer him to the Indians to quickly end the conflict. Tom wins the argument and Peso remains in the station.

However, with the help of Fanny, who gives her guns to Peso, he robs Tom and the others and demands that they surrender the gold. Tom shoots the gun from his father's hand. Despite the robbery attempt, Tom continues to believe that his father is not responsible for the Indian attack. A fierce battle begins with the Indians and those trapped inside the station. During the fighting, an Indian emissary tries to negotiate, but Tom again refuses to surrender his father and the fighting resumes. During the battle, Peso slugs Pike Curtis, the real killer, and gives him to the Indians. With all doubt about his father removed, Tom stays behind with Nancy while the stagecoach leaves for San Francisco. Later, Madre informs Tom that the gold is not safe because the young boy assigned to guard it is another of Peso's sons.

== Cast ==
- Gilbert Roland as Peso Herrera
- Glenda Farrell as Fanny Webson
- Robert Horton as Tom Herrera
- Robert Blake as Luis Herrera
- Barbara Ruick as Nancy Dekker
- Gene Lockhart as Cyril R. Snowden
- Harry Morgan as Ed Cotten
- Patricia Tiernan as Lorraine Sayburn
- Hank Worden as Amber
- Douglass Dumbrille as Major Dekker
- Iron Eyes Cody as Apache (uncredited)

== Production ==
The film is based on the 1939 short story "Stage Station" by Ernest Haycox.

Some of the scenes in Apache War Smoke were culled from the 1942 MGM film Apache Trail, which was also based on a short story by Haycox. Many of the film's exteriors were shot on location in Soledad Canyon near Santa Clarita, California.

== Box office ==
According to MGM records, the film earned $577,000 in the U.S. and Canada and $220,000 elsewhere, returning a profit of $121,000.
