= Alex Romero (choreographer) =

American dancer and choreographer (1913–2007)

- Born: Alejandro Bernardo Quiroga; August 20, 1913; San Antonio, Texas, US
- Died: September 8, 2007 (aged 94); Woodland Hills, California, US
- Occupation(s): Choreographer, dancer
- Years active: 1929–1980s
- Spouse: Frances Driscoll (married 1936–1997)

Alejandro Bernardo Quiroga, better known as Alex Romero (August 20, 1913 – September 8, 2007) was an American dancer and choreographer who was noted for directing Elvis Presley's dancing in the movie Jailhouse Rock and for working with noted dancers and choreographers at Metro-Goldwyn-Mayer (MGM) during the 1940s and 1950s.

In addition to choreographing Jailhouse Rock, Romero worked with performers and choreographers who included Gene Kelly, Hermes Pan, Stanley Donen, Fred Astaire, and Michael Kidd in films that included On the Town and An American in Paris, in which he also performed during ballet sequences. He also staged dances as in the films Easter Parade, Seven Brides for Seven Brothers and Kiss Me Kate and television shows.

Romero has been called "the last link to the Golden Age of movie musicals."

== Early life ==
Romero's parents were General don Miguel Quiroga Cantu and Soledad Chapa Quiroga, who had 22 sons and a daughter. His father, a general in the Mexican Army, was a confidante of Mexico's president Victoriano Huerta, and was a member of Mexico's political elite. Romero's mother fled across the border after her husband was killed in the Battle of Monterrey during the Mexican Revolution. Soledad Quiroga fled first to Laredo, Texas and then to San Antonio, where Alejandro was born on August 20, 1913. Six of Romero's siblings eventually joined the family in San Antonio. Alejandro was known as Alex from an early age.

== Career ==
=== Early dance career ===
The family moved in 1921 to Los Angeles, where his older brother Carlos was working as a dancer in silent films. Carlos and his siblings began a Spanish dance act, "The Romeros", and Alex joined them in 1929. Their dance act played on vaudeville circuits. The act went overseas in the 1930s and played at the 1936 Olympics in Berlin. In one 1938 incident in Poland, Romero was almost shot by a German officer who believed him to be Jewish.

In 1941, after working in a print shop, Romero registered with Central Casting and was hired as a dancer by Warner Brothers' dance director LeRoy Prinz. He also appeared in the 1943 film The Heat's On, which starred Mae West, and Follow the Boys a 1944 film with George Raft and Vera Zorina.

In 1944, Romero was recruited by Jack Cole to join the dance department that he had just established at Columbia Pictures. He and the studio dance troupe performed in a number of Columbia films, including Eadie Was a Lady and The Thrill of Brazil, both with Ann Miller. In 1947, during a technicians' strike Cole and his dancers left Columbia to create a nightclub act.

=== Film choreography ===
Romero left Cole's troupe in 1947 and shortly afterwards was hired by Metro-Goldwyn-Mayer dance director Robert Alton as an assistant choreographer. His first film assignment was with Gene Kelly, who was creating a dance routine to the music of Slaughter on Tenth Avenue that he would perform with Vera-Ellen for the film Words and Music. Romero also choreographed the "Thou Swell" dance performed by June Allyson and the Blackburn Twins in that film.

Romero also worked as assistant choreographer in Easter Parade and in On the Town, in which he appeared as one of the two sailors dancing with Kelly in the Day in New York ballet. He worked again with Kelly as assistant choreographer of An American in Paris, and appeared as a G.I. in the ballet sequence.

Romero's first assignment as a choreographer was in the 1950 film The Red Danube, directed by George Sidney, in which he worked with Janet Leigh, a non-dancer, in one of her earliest film roles. He then was an assistant to Alton in Annie Get Your Gun, and worked with Judy Garland on the "I'm An Indian Too" number, performing as well as choreographing. As choreographer of the 1953 film The Affairs of Dobie Gillis he choreographed dance numbers performed by Bob Fosse in his first film role.

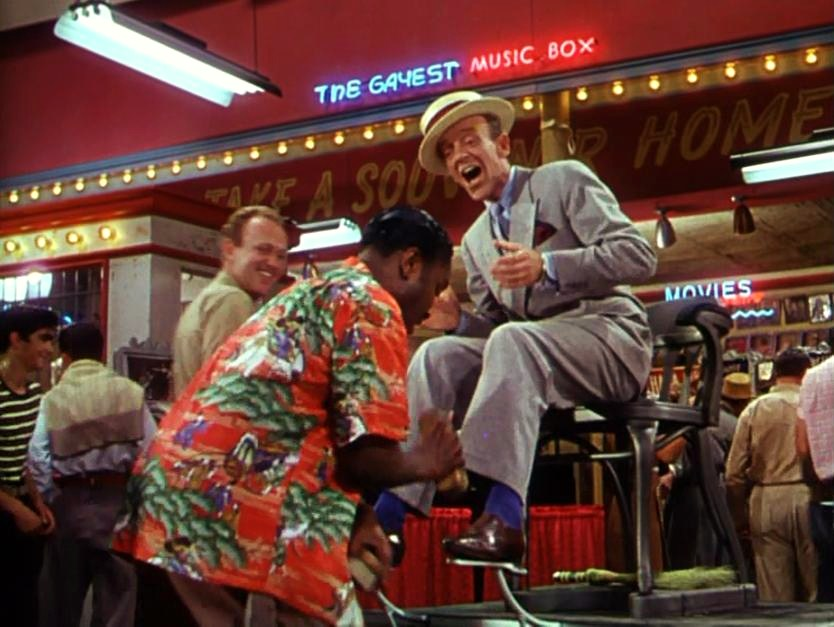
Shoeshiner Leroy Daniels with Fred Astaire in The Band Wagon

Romero assisted Hermes Pan in the film version of Kiss Me Kate, and went on to work with Michael Kidd in choreographing the 1953 film The Band Wagon, starring Fred Astaire. It was Romero's idea to hire for the film Leroy Daniels, a non-actor who was working as a shoeshiner in Los Angeles and noted for his rhythmic work. Daniels performed with Astaire in the "Shine on Your Shoes" number, set in a penny arcade, and subsequently went into show business full-time.

After working as assistant choreographer to Kidd on Seven Brides for Seven Brothers, Romero was choreographer of his first big-budget film Love Me or Leave Me, starring Doris Day and James Cagney. He also was the choreographer for the 1955 film I'll Cry Tomorrow.

In 1956 he was choreographer of the Broadway musical Happy Hunting, which starred Ethel Merman. It was his only Broadway credit.

==== Jailhouse Rock ====
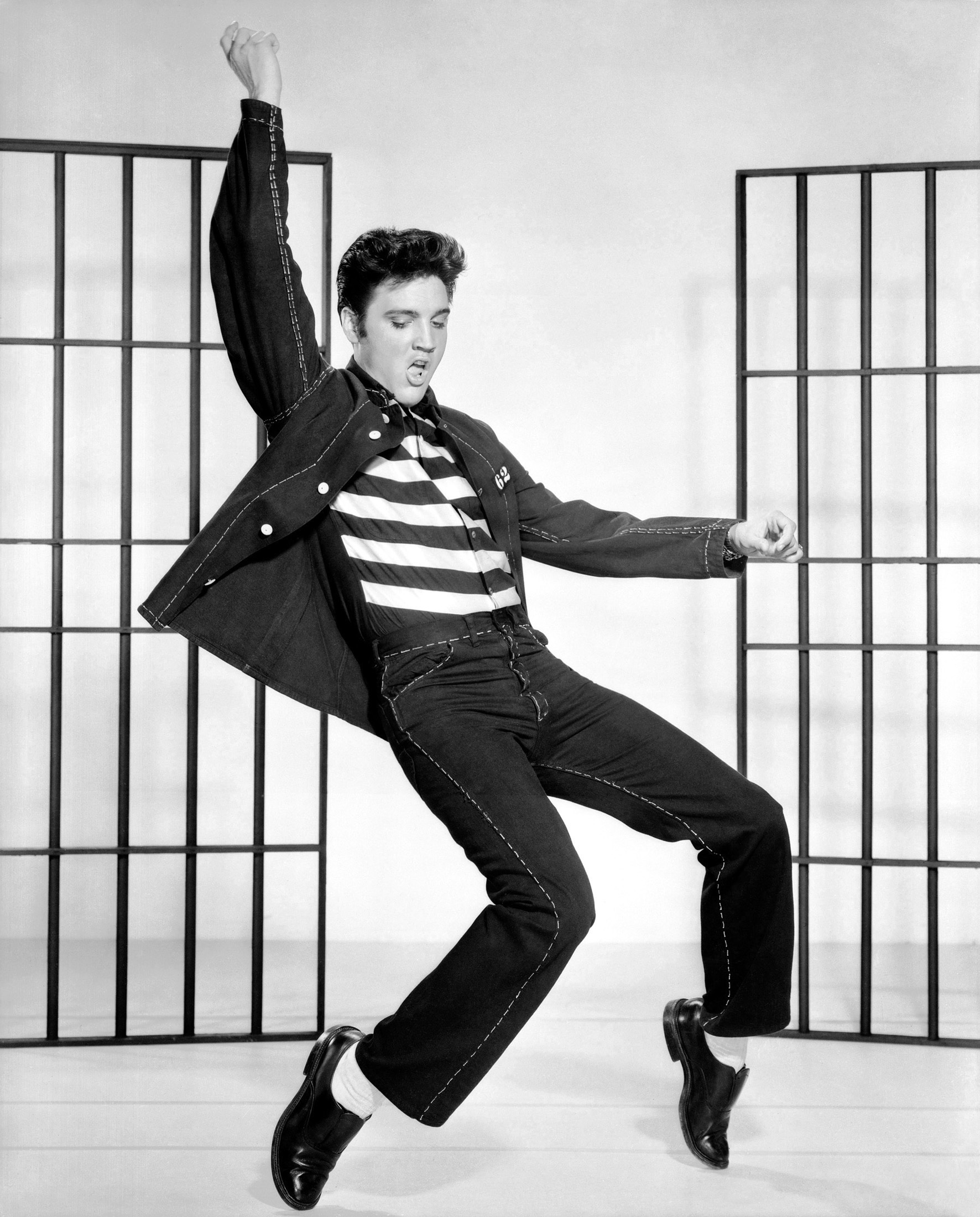
Romero choreographed Elvis Presley's Jailhouse Rock dance.

When Romero was assigned by MGM production executive Pandro S. Berman to work on a new Elvis Presley film in 1957, Presley, a non-dancer, was wary. He said that he "didn't want anyone making a Hollywood boy out of me." Romero won over his confidence, and was helped by Russ Tamblyn, who worked with Presley on his leg movement.

The "Jailhouse Rock" number, which shows Presley dancing with other inmates, was Presley's first choreographed dance number. Rather than give him "slick dancing steps", Romero later said that he "chose steps that were foreign to him, but that were also like him, so he could pick them up."

Romero worked with Presley on the "Jailhouse Rock" number that was the climax of the film, but due to an oversight received no screen credit for his work. Berman sent Romero a letter of apology that was published in Variety. Romero's biographer Mark Knowles says that the "Jailhouse Rock" is "seen by many as a groundbreaking sequence in the history of film dancing, a transitional number propelling the film musical into the modern era."

He went on to choreograph three other Presley films: Clambake (1967), Double Trouble, (1967) and Speedway (1968).

=== Later career ===
After Jailhouse Rock, Romero was choreographer of Tom Thumb (1958) which starred Russ Tamblyn. As film musicals waned, Romero worked as choreographer on non-musical films with dance sequences such as The George Raft Story (1961), as well as television shows, including The Eddie Fisher Show. He choreographed burlesque numbers for Joanne Woodward in The Stripper (1963). He also staged nightclub acts for Howard Keel, Bobby Short and other performers.

In 1976 he returned to MGM to stage a dance number with Gene Kelly and Fred Astaire in That's Entertainment Part II. He danced with Kelly in a 1978 television special, "An American in Pasadena". He also performed in the 1981 film Pennies From Heaven, and worked on television shows and films throughout the 1980s. His last work was for Tracey Ullman's Show.

== Personal life ==
Romero married Frances Driscoll in 1936. She died in 1997. He moved to the Motion Picture and Television Fund home in 2003 and died there on September 8, 2007.
