= Barbara Ruick =

American actress and singer (1932–1974)

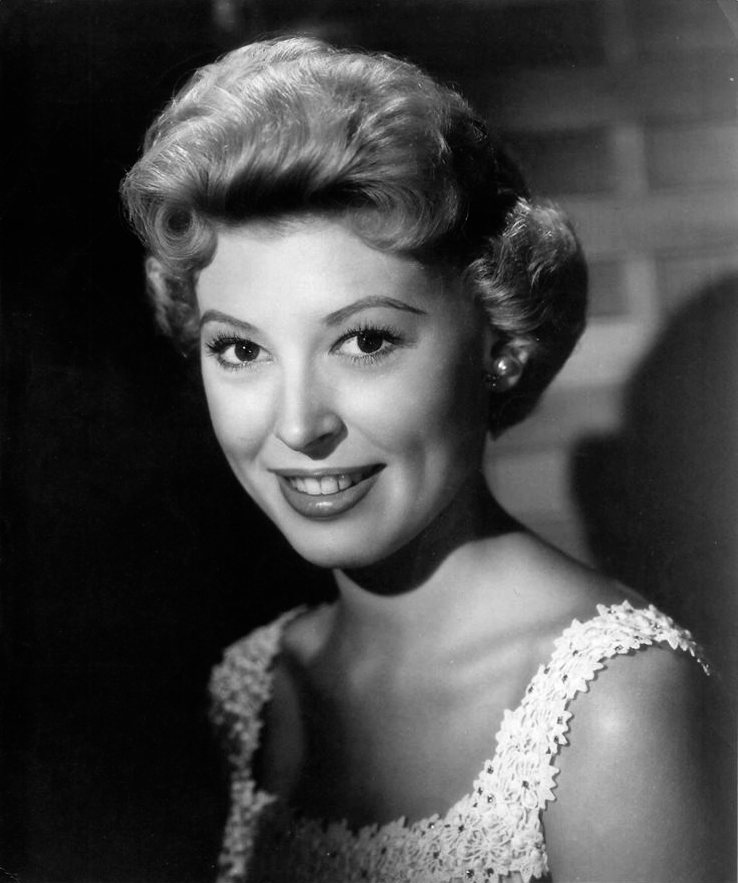
- Ruick, c. 1950s
- Born: December 23, 1932; Pasadena, California, U.S.
- Died: March 3, 1974 (aged 41); Reno, Nevada, U.S.
- Occupations: Actress, singer
- Spouses: Frank Howren (m. 1949; ann. 1949); Robert Horton (m. 1953; div. 1956); John Williams (m. 1956)
- Children: 3, including Joseph
- Parents: Melville Ruick (father); Lurene Tuttle (mother)
- Relatives: Ethan Gruska and Bobby Gruska (grandchildren); Jay Gruska (son-in-law)

Barbara Ruick (December 23, 1932 – March 3, 1974) was an American actress and singer.

== Early years ==
Ruick was born on December 23, 1932, in Pasadena, California, a suburb of Los Angeles. Her parents, Lurene Tuttle and Melville Ruick, were actors. and grew up acting out scenes with dolls, employing her mother as an audience.

Ruick attended North Hollywood High School. She did little acting in high school but joined a school band at the age of 14. Ruick sang with the band at dances and benefits.

== Career ==
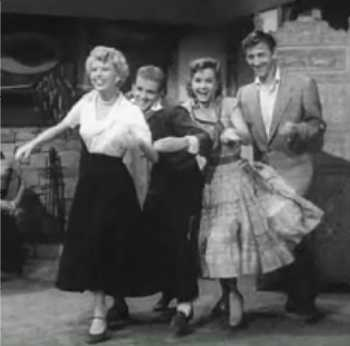
L-R: Ruick with Bob Fosse, Debbie Reynolds and Bobby Van in The Affairs of Dobie Gillis (1953)

Early in her career, Ruick sang in clubs and acted in Little Theater productions. She achieved success in radio, then signed as a contract player with Metro-Goldwyn-Mayer. She was heard in the original radio version of Dragnet. She also recorded several songs for MGM Records. In the 1950s, Ruick starred as Kay in the first LP recording of the songs from George Gershwin and Ira Gershwin's 1926 Broadway musical Oh, Kay!. This studio cast recording was released by Columbia Records and conducted by Lehman Engel.

She landed a job on Hollywood Screen Test, a talent show which aired on ABC from 1948 to 1953. Ruick appeared on the Kraft Television Theatre, soap operas, and The College Bowl (1950), which was hosted by Chico Marx. She also performed for fifteen weeks on The Jerry Colonna Show. In 1955, she was a regular on The Johnny Carson Show.

She made guest appearances on The Millionaire (1957), The Public Defender (1954), The Brothers Brannagan (1960), The 20th Century Fox Hour (1956), and Climax Mystery Theater (1955).

In 1951, Ruick was signed by MGM for a role in the film Invitation (1952). She had bit parts in her first four films, one of them being The Band Wagon (1953), and then graduated to supporting roles. Her best remembered roles both came from Rodgers and Hammerstein. She played Carrie Pipperidge in the film version of Carousel (1956) and Esmerelda, one of the wicked stepsisters, in the 1965 TV version of Rodgers and Hammerstein's Cinderella.

She released several singles of her singing on the MGM label in 1952 and 1953, including some with arrangements by Nelson Riddle.

== Personal life ==
Ruick married actor Robert Horton in 1953. She had co-starred with Horton in the movie Apache War Smoke the previous year. The couple separated just prior to their second wedding anniversary in 1955 and divorced in 1956, just after he accompanied her to the world premiere of Carousel. She then married composer John Williams, who later became famous for Star Wars and many other films. Williams dedicated his First Violin Concerto to her memory (notes to DGG recording 289 471 326–2). During her marriage to Williams, Ruick appeared in few motion pictures. They had three children together, one of whom, Joseph Williams, is lead singer in the rock band Toto.

== Death ==
Ruick died in Reno, Nevada, aged 41, while playing a small role on location in Robert Altman's California Split. She was found dead the afternoon of March 3, 1974, in her hotel room, where her body had been lying for 10 to 12 hours. She had complained of nausea and a headache the previous night. The coroner found that her death was caused by a ruptured berry (saccular) aneurysm and intracerebral hemorrhage. She was interred at the Columbarium of Blessedness, Forest Lawn Memorial Park, Glendale, California.

== Filmography ==
Year	Title	Role	Notes
1952	Invitation	Sarah	
1952	Scaramouche	Amoureause	Uncredited
1952	You for Me	Ann Elcott	
1952	Fearless Fagan	Second Nurse	
1952	Apache War Smoke	Nancy Dekker	
1952	Above and Beyond	Mary Malone	
1953	Confidentially Connie	Barbara	
1953	I Love Melvin	Studio Guide	
1953	The Band Wagon	Passenger on Train	Uncredited
1953	The Affairs of Dobie Gillis	Lorna Ellingboe	
1956	Carousel	Carrie Pipperidge	
1956	The Star of Bethlehem	Narrator	Reissue version
1974	California Split	Reno Barmaid	Posthmous release; final film role
