= Too Much of a Good Thing (radio play) =

Too Much of a Good Thing is a radio play, recorded entirely on location, as if it were a film, by Mike Leigh. Liane Aukin, the 'midwife' of the project, a BBC radio producer, knew Leigh through her brother David, the general manager at Hampstead Theatre. She had initially asked Leigh to revive Abigail's Party on the radio, but he preferred to supply an original piece. Ronald Mason, the head of radio drama, was enthusiastic and allocated £5000.

Leigh rehearsed the play for three weeks with the three actors - Lesley Manville, Philip Davis and Eric Allan. In the fourth week they went out and 'shot' the radio play as if it were a film. It was completed in May 1979. Ronald Mason was pleased with the result, but Ian McIntyre, controller of Radio 3, censored the broadcast, claiming the play was 'boring' and 'not good enough'. The play was finally broadcast in July 1992.

The critic Michael Coveney has described the radio play as "probably the least-known example of Leigh's best work, a script of unremitting black and greasy grottiness." A fat girl, Pamela, (Lesley Manville), who works in an estate agents and lives with her equally fat, widowed father, Mr Payne (Eric Allan), in Barking, east London, loses her virginity to her driving instructor, Graham (Phil Davis). "Above all it's the realism that is so startling, the actors really are in situ, and not skilfully turning pages in front of a microphone..the fifteen minute seduction scene was done, for almost absolute real, with Manville and Davis stripping down naked by night in an Islington bedroom wired for sound, and Leigh lurking outside with his sound recordists in the van...Manville recalls that the foreplay was enacted, on the take, right up to the moment of penetration, when it was decided that Davis would grab a little cushion which he placed between the two of them so he could, as Manville says, 'do the thrusting and carry on'."
