= Coffee and Cigarettes: Somewhere in California =

1993 short film directed Jim Jarmusch

Coffee and Cigarettes: Somewhere in California is a 1993 black-and-white short film directed by writer/director Jim Jarmusch shot in Northern California. The film consists primarily of a conversation between musicians Tom Waits and Iggy Pop in a coffee shop. The film would later be included as the third segment (which explains why it is sometimes referred to as "Coffee and Cigarettes III") in the feature-length Coffee and Cigarettes released in 2003. The film won the Golden Palm at the 1993 Cannes Film Festival as best "Short Film".

== Summary ==
Tom Waits arrives to meet Iggy Pop waiting for him in an empty diner, stating he was late because he had to perform surgery before coming there. Iggy meekly enjoys Tom's presence, while Tom seems to struggle with being aloof. Once in a while things loosen up and the two occasionally bond. They connect when talking about having quit cigarettes, and each lights one up to celebrate this fact. When Iggy casually mentions Tom's music isn't on the jukebox, Tom gets defensive saying maybe Iggy would be happier if they went some place more "mainstream" like Taco Bell or the International House of Pancakes. But then they both break down again and admit they both drink the coffee at IHOP. Iggy then recommends a drummer he thinks Tom would like to work with, when Tom gets offended by thinking Iggy is implying his music is not good enough as it is. Iggy finds an excuse to leave, and as he does Tom starts to miss him and tries to get him to stay. When finally alone, Tom cheers himself up by noticing Iggy Pop doesn't have any songs on the jukebox either.

== Production ==
Jim Jarmusch recalls the shooting process thus:

Tom was exhausted. We had just shot a video the day before for "I Don't Wanna Grow Up" and he had been doing a lot of press. He was kind of in a surly mood as he is sometimes, but he's also very warm. He came in late that morning - I had given him the script the night before - and I was with Iggy. Tom threw the script down on the table and said, "Well, you know, you said this was going to be funny, Jim. Maybe you better just circle the jokes 'cause I don't see them". He looked at poor Iggy and said, "What do you think Iggy?" Iggy said, "I think I'm gonna go get some coffee and let you guys talk." So I calmed Tom down. I knew it was just early in the morning and Tom was in a bad mood. His attitude changed completely, but I wanted him to keep some of that paranoid surliness in the script. We worked with that and kept it in his character. If he had been in a really good mood, I don't think the film would have been as funny."
