= California Split =

1974 film by Robert Altman

- Promotional poster
- Directed by: Robert Altman
- Written by: Joseph Walsh
- Produced by: Joseph Walsh; Robert Altman
- Starring: George Segal; Elliott Gould
- Cinematography: Paul Lohmann
- Edited by: O. Nicholas Brown; Lou Lombardo
- Production companies: Spelling-Goldberg Productions; Won World
- Distributed by: Columbia Pictures
- Release date: August 7, 1974
- Running time: 108 minutes
- Country: United States
- Language: English
- Box office: $5 million (US/Canada) (rentals)

California Split is a 1974 American comedy-drama film directed by Robert Altman and starring Elliott Gould and George Segal as a pair of gamblers. It was the first non-Cinerama film to use eight-track stereo sound.

== Plot ==
In Los Angeles, a friendship blossoms between Bill Denny and Charlie Waters, fueled by their shared passion for gambling. The connection solidifies after a card player, whose winnings they have acquired, subjects them to a violent assault and robbery. Charlie, a wisecracking joker residing with two prostitutes, emerges as a seasoned gambler perpetually seeking the next big score. His wagers span poker, horse racing, boxing, and any opportunity offering odds.

Initially, Bill is not as deeply entrenched in the gambling world. By day, he dabbles in work at a magazine, sidestepping his boss. Nevertheless, he is well on his way to succumbing to a full-fledged gaming addiction. As the two men traverse Charlie's home, Bill's office, seedy bars, card rooms, and various sports venues, Bill succumbs to the allure of the gambling lifestyle. To fuel his burgeoning habit, he plunges into debt with Sparkie, his bookie, and resorts to pawning possessions, including his car, to finance a bus trip to Reno.

During their journey, Charlie identifies the assailant who mugged them at the film's outset. Seizing the opportunity for retribution, he confronts and robs the offender. On the road to Reno, Bill and Charlie pool their resources to stake Bill in a high-stakes poker game, featuring former world champion Amarillo Slim as one of the players, portraying himself. Bill emerges victorious, pocketing $18,000, and is convinced of his hot streak.

Emboldened, he transitions to blackjack, roulette, and finally craps, accumulating more wealth with each game. However, an anti-climatic, yet profitable outcome at the craps table leaves Bill emotionally drained and indifferent. Despite Charlie's enthusiasm to continue gambling at other casinos, Bill, after splitting their winnings ($82,000), declares his intention to quit and return home. Although Charlie struggles to comprehend Bill's decision, he recognizes his friend's sincerity, and they part ways.

== Cast ==
- George Segal as Bill Denny
- Elliott Gould as Charlie Waters
- Ann Prentiss as Barbara Miller
- Gwen Welles as Susan Peters
- Edward Walsh as Lew
- Joseph Walsh as Sparkie
- Bert Remsen as Helen Brown
- Jeff Goldblum as Lloyd Harris
- Barbara Ruick as Reno Barmaid

== Production ==
=== Development ===
Joseph Walsh had been an actor for over 20 years. Frustrated with the progress of his career and the sorts of roles he had been playing, he wrote a screenplay about his own gambling addiction in 1971. "I knew so much about gambling," he said. "And nobody writes gambling well... I was writing for all the gamblers of the world, people who are going to turn out and watch the movie and say, 'Oh, God, this man is in our heart and soul'," said Walsh later.

=== Steven Spielberg ===
Walsh was friends with then up-and-coming filmmaker Steven Spielberg and they worked on the script for nine months. Spielberg was fascinated by the characters and would react to Walsh's script, offering suggestions. At the time the screenplay was called Slide and the two men had a deal to make it at MGM with Walsh as producer and Steve McQueen in the starring role. However, the studio began making unrealistic demands, like having the script be an exact number of pages (in a movie script, 1 page = 1 minute), and wanting the whole story to be set at the Circus Circus casino in Las Vegas because MGM owned it.

A month away from filming, the studio experienced a shake-up at the executive level and with it came a new set of changes. MGM wanted the story to be a mafia-related “sting” concept with Dean Martin as one of the two main characters. Walsh would no longer be the producer. He and Spielberg left MGM and took the script to Universal Pictures where they had an agreement with Richard D. Zanuck and David Brown. Zanuck and Brown then hired Spielberg to direct The Sugarland Express, leaving Walsh and his film stranded.

=== Robert Altman ===
Walsh's agent, Guy McElwaine, contacted Altman's agent George Litto to give the script to Altman, who loved it. The new studio chief of Columbia Pictures was a former agent who knew Walsh's agent and green-lit the screenplay to be produced on the writer's terms.

Walsh was a novice and unaware of Altman's reputation for taking liberties with the screenplays for his movies. Walsh was very protective of his script and argued with Altman numerous times about certain aspects. Walsh remembers, “You know, he actually stormed out of the room many times on me during the picture, during these conversations, but he would always come back and listen as I got to know him more...”

Altman eventually financed the film by forming a production company with Aaron Spelling and Leonard Goldberg, Won World Productions.

=== Casting ===
George Segal was cast early on and Walsh considered long-time friend Elliott Gould, but saw other actors, such as Peter Falk and Robert De Niro. He kept coming back to Gould and finally the actor called him up and convinced him that he was right for the role. Walsh recalls, “because Elliott lived his gambling, he came out of the box just like in a horse race when a great horse comes out of the box. The first day of shooting, he was there as that character...After seven days, George Segal came to me and said, ‘This guy’s [Gould] unbelievable. He’s an octopus. He is absolutely strangling me to death. I don’t even know what to do.’ The man was pleading for his life.” Walsh told Segal not to try to keep up with Gould because he had actually lived the life of his character in the film and to continue acting the way he had been doing so far.

=== Filming ===
Filming started in January 1974, and the filming took place mostly in Los Angeles, with two weeks' location filming in Reno, Nevada.

California Split was the first feature film to use the experimental eight-track sound system, one that allowed eight separate audio channels to be recorded, and helped develop Altman’s trademark of overlapping dialogue. To this end, he gave the supporting actors and extras significant emphasis on the soundtrack. A number of the extras were members of Synanon, an organization for ex-addicts. Altman also used champion poker player Amarillo Slim in the movie "to add drama to the poker game for the actors and crew. He elevated the game to a very high professional level."

He had originally considered Haskell Wexler to be the director of photography on the film, but went with newcomer Paul Lohmann instead. Walsh remembers that Altman defended the choice by saying, "They could create a look together, and he might get into conflict with Haskell or other people about making it a little prettier than it should be."

Altman ended up making the film in Pomona at Fairplex Park, in Los Angeles, and in Reno, Nevada, with the latter location being very effective in keeping everyone in the gambling spirit of the movie. Altman said in an interview, "Everybody was involved in that atmosphere, and there was a sense of reality because one minute you were downstairs in the Mapes casino losing money and winning money, and then a minute later you were upstairs on the set filming a crap game."

While on location in Reno, Nevada, actress Barbara Ruick, who played a friendly Reno poker room bartender, died at the age of 41, of a cerebral hemorrhage sleeping in her hotel room. Her husband, famed film composer John Williams, was left a widower with their three children. California Split was dedicated to her.

The ending of the film was different from originally scripted.

== Reception ==
=== Critical ===
Roger Ebert, in his review for the Chicago Sun-Times, wrote, "At the end of California Split we realize that Altman has made a lot more than a comedy about gambling; he's taken us into an American nightmare, and all the people we met along the way felt genuine and looked real." Lauding the film as "a great movie and [...] a great experience, too," he awarded it four out of four stars. Vincent Canby in The New York Times called it "a fascinating and vivid movie, not quite comparable to any other movie that I can immediately think of." He praised the film for being "dense with fine, idiosyncratic detail, a lot of which is supplied by Mr. Gould and Mr. Segal as well as by members of the excellent supporting cast." He put it on his year-end unranked list of the best films of 1974. Gene Siskel liked most of the film and awarded three out of four stars, but disliked the ending for "events too pat and a moral that's banal." A review by Arthur D. Murphy in Variety reported that "the film is technically and physically handsome, all the more so for being mostly location work, but lacks a cohesive and reinforced sense of story direction. The stars have done better comedy before." Charles Champlin of the Los Angeles Times was negative, writing that "for the most part, 'California Split' seems one very long and very loud actors workshop improv, done in card parlors and casinos instead of on a bare stage. The garbled, stomped-on, incomprehensible dialogue which was annoying in the early stages of 'McCabe and Mrs. Miller' here seems so self-indulgently and needlessly overdone as to give a whole new dimension to the splitting headache." Gary Arnold of The Washington Post called it "a slight but cheerful and beguiling episodic comedy."

Penelope Gilliatt of The New Yorker wrote in a positive review, "It is sometimes very funny, in a mood of not caring whether you find it so or not ... Altman again shows that he has a mysterious feeling for the low-toned energy of American humor. His films have a supple genius for the awkward in speech." John Simon said of California Split, "In Altman's 111 minutes we haven't the time to go mad, only to be thoroughly exasperated". Stanley Kauffmann of The New Republic wrote of California Split, "The film ambles along trying to set up an adult Huck and Tom story escape from 'straight' life, and it has some amusing scenes, but it fails: the two men are insufficiently interesting. And it tells us zero about the gambling compulsion".

On Rotten Tomatoes, the film holds a rating of 88% from 32 reviews and an average rating of 7.5/10. The consensus summarizes: "Aimless yet amiable, California Split is minor but rewarding Altman, elevated by the chemistry between leads Elliott Gould and George Segal." In a retrospective review New York Magazine's Vulture.com praised it as the greatest film about gambling ever made.

=== Box office ===
The film reportedly grossed over five million dollars at the box office despite the studio pulling it early from theaters. Altman said of the reaction to his movies, “I just have to hope that the film I do falls in with the mass audience and they will go see it. But one reason I have problems is that they don’t advertise the films I make because they don’t know where to put them...They don’t quite know where it is, so consequently, they try to advertise it as a different film. And it still doesn’t succeed.”

== Accolades ==
It was nominated for a Best Comedy (Written Directly for the Screen) Writers Guild of America award a year later.

== Home media and alternate cuts ==
The film was released on DVD in 2004, but music rights problems forced Sony/Columbia to exclude almost three minutes of footage and make several soundtrack changes. The DVD is already out of print. In 2020, the original cut of the film with its soundtrack restored was released on Amazon Prime Video.

== Planned sequel ==
In 2021, Walsh completed the screenplay for a sequel entitled Lunch with Bill & Charlie, with a concept inspired by the 1981 film My Dinner with Andre. The film would have reunited Segal and Gould as their characters from the original film, but, upon Segal's death, Walsh instead posted the screenplay online and released a tribute video to Segal with Gould.
