= Reginald Pollack =

American painter

Reginald Murray Pollack
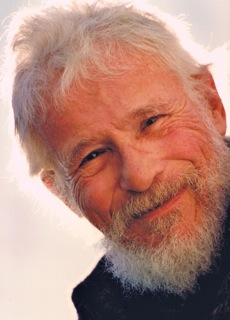
- Born: June 29, 1924; Middle Village, Long Island, New York.
- Died: December 6, 2001 (aged 77); Palm Springs, California.
- Occupation: Painter

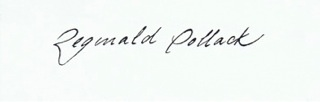
Reginald Pollack Logo

Reginald Murray Pollack (July 29, 1924 – December 6, 2001) was an American painter known for metaphorical and theme based works of art. He was also a veteran of World War II having served in the Pacific Theater of Operations.

== Early life ==
Pollack was born to Hungarian immigrants in Middle Village, Long Island, New York, on July 29, 1924. He graduated from the High School of Music and Art in New York City. Pollack had an identical twin brother Merrill, who was an editor and writer with positions at the Saturday Evening Post, Simon and Schuster and Viking Press. Another brother, Louis Pollack, established the Peridot Gallery on Madison Avenue in New York. Pollack and his brothers were routinely taken by their father, who was a tailor at Lord and Taylor, to the Metropolitan Museum of Art. There, they taught themselves to sketch. After serving in the U.S. Armed Forces Pollack using the GI bill traveled to Paris to study art. There he married his first wife Hanna Ben Dov, also an artist. He also married his second wife, Naomi Newman, an opera singer while living in Paris. This second marriage produced two daughters, Jane and Maia. His third wife was Kerstin Birgitta Binns, who he married in 1974. In 1971, Pollack wrote The Magician and the Child, dedicated to Kerstin Birgitta. Currently, she is the curator of the Reginald Pollack Collection.

== Professional career ==
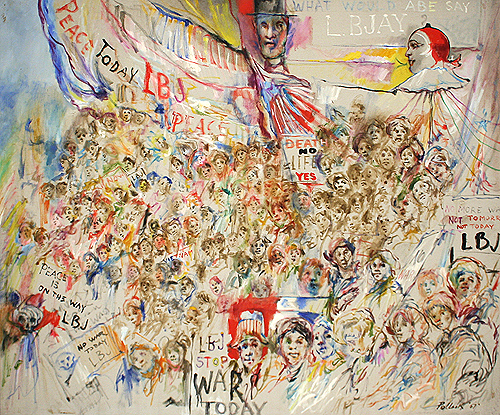
Peace March- Reginald Pollack from the Collection of the Lowe Art Museum

Pollack was a founding member of Galerie Huit, the first gallerie in Paris operated by Americans; there were 12 of them, all World War II Veterans. While in Paris he studied at the Academie de la Grande Chaumiere, (1948–1952). Pollack said the tutelage of the Parisian artists he came in contact with through the art school made him realize his "responsibility to civilization". Pollack spent 14 years in Paris, living next-door to Constantin Brâncuși who became his mentor for eight years. The history of Galerie Huit is a remarkable and significant one in the recent history of American art." The artists represented at Galerie Huit were: Rodney P. Abrahamson, Oscar Chelimsky, Carmen D'Avino, Sydney Geist, Burt Hasen, Al Held, Raymond Hendler, Herbert Katzman, Paul Keene, Jonah Kinigstein, Jules Olitski, George Ortman, Marianna Pineda, Jack Robinowitz, Haywood Bill Rivers, Robert L. Rosenwald, Shinkichi Tajiri, Harold Tovish, Hugh Townley and Hugh Weiss.

During World War II, where he served in the 87th Mountain Division participating in the invasion of Kiska in the Aleutians and also in the South Pacific, propelled him to produce and illustrate O is for Overkill with his twin brother Merrill. Both were WW II combat veterans. In May 2011 the Lowe Art Museum at the University of Miami chose Pollack's Peace March, to pay honor to his art and political activism. Art critic Alexis Gray wrote:" Reginald Murray Pollack, who studied at New York City's High School of Music and Art before serving in the U.S. Army Air Force during World War II, was described by his twin brother in a June 1977 Esquire article as "a fine artist, humanist, poetically inclined anti-Vietnam war peace marcher, participant, with other artists, in an antiwar coalition, occasional user of pot and sympathizer with hippies and yippies and most youthful rebels." The same year Peace March was completed, Reginald Pollack's career was highlighted in the Star Trek episode "Requiem for Methuselah." In it, the fictional character Mr. Flint, an immortal human from Earth who lived under several aliases over a span of six thousand years, acquires a painting by Pollack that is prominently displayed in his castle on Holberg 917G. In a key scene at Flint's residence, during which Spock explains to a host of dignitaries the significance of Western art since the Italian Renaissance, the Starfleet first officer likens Pollack's career to that of Leonardo da Vinci. Pollack's work is now represented in the Metropolitan Museum of Art, Stanford University, and the New Orleans Museum of Art."

Upon his move back to the United States in 1960 Pollack became an art instructor and Visiting Critic of Art at Yale University. Pollack became interested in philosophy and helped establish the Jungian encounter movement in California, developing art as therapy. It was at his time that he met his third wife, Kerstin Birgitta and his art became more metaphysical. The year of their marriage he wrote a morality play "The War of the Angels", performed at the National Cathedral. In 1977, Penn State University held a Pollack painting exhibition and during the University's annual arts festival.

Pollack died in Palm Springs, California in 2001
