= 46th Academy Awards =

- Date: April 2, 1974
- Site: Dorothy Chandler Pavilion; Los Angeles, California
- Hosted by: Burt Reynolds, Diana Ross, John Huston and David Niven
- Produced by: Jack Haley Jr.
- Directed by: Marty Pasetta

Highlights
- Best Picture: The Sting
- Most awards: The Sting (7)
- Most nominations: The Exorcist and The Sting (10)

TV in the United States
- Network: NBC
- Duration: 3 hours, 23 minutes
- Ratings: 44.7 million

The 46th Academy Awards were presented on Tuesday, April 2, 1974, at the Dorothy Chandler Pavilion in Los Angeles, California. The ceremonies were presided over by Burt Reynolds, Diana Ross, John Huston, and David Niven.

The Sting won seven awards, including Best Picture and Best Director for George Roy Hill. The Exorcist and The Way We Were were the only other films to win multiple awards. Marvin Hamlisch won three awards, making him the third person to achieve this feat and, to date, the only person who has won three Oscars in one year without winning Best Picture. It is the most recent ceremony in which the three highest-grossing films of the year were nominated for Best Picture (The Exorcist, The Sting and American Graffiti).

== Winners and nominees ==
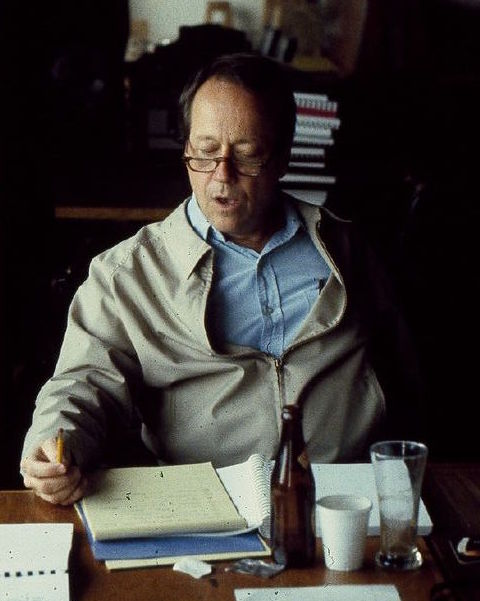
George Roy Hill, Best Director winner

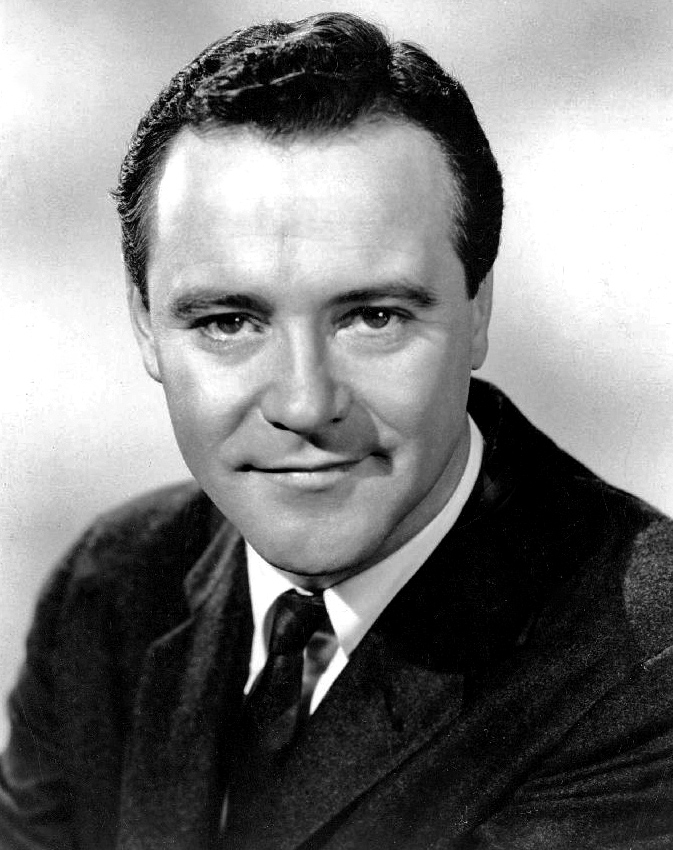
Jack Lemmon, Best Actor winner

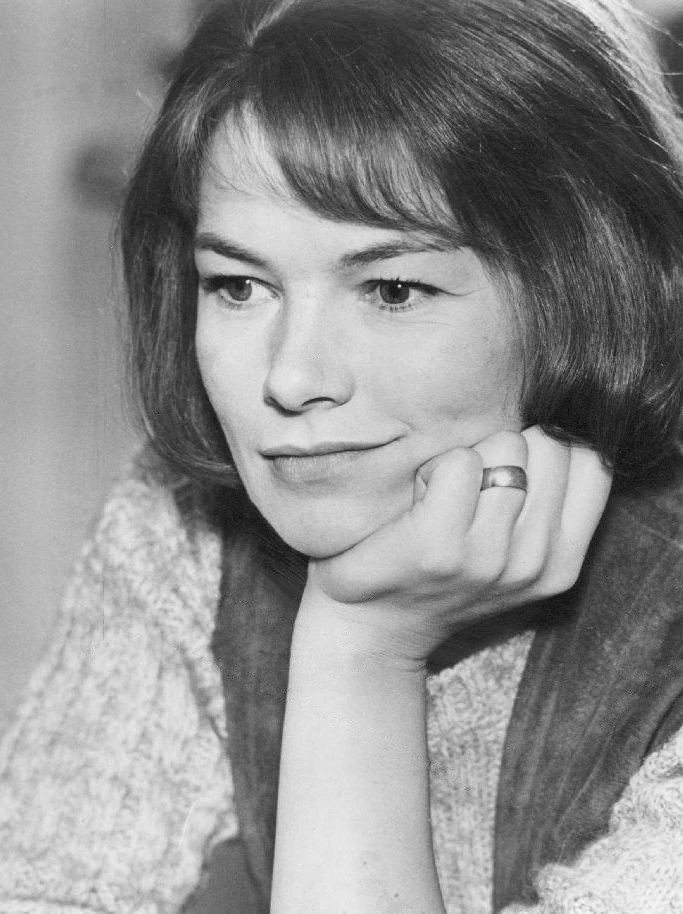
Glenda Jackson, Best Actress winner

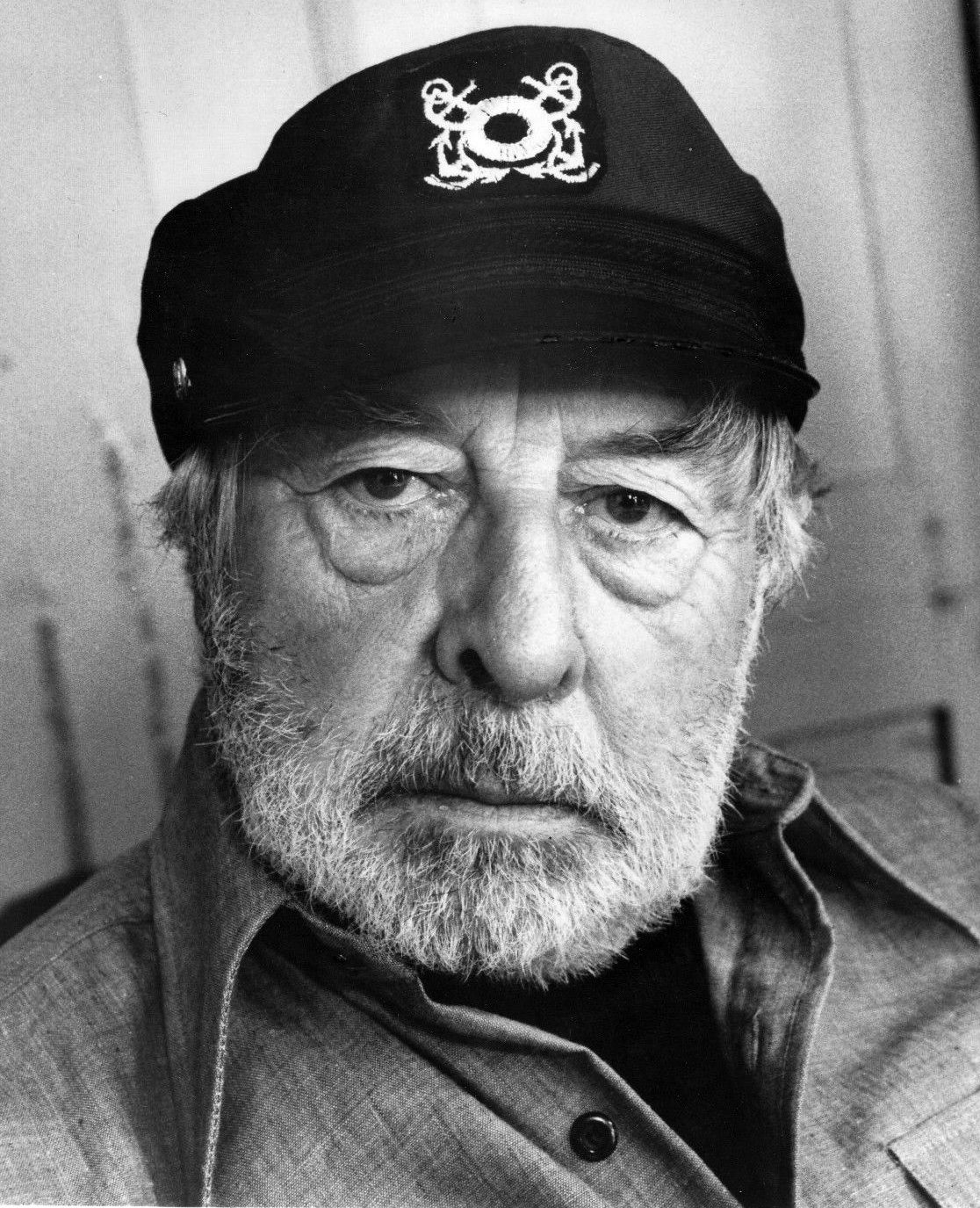
John Houseman, Best Supporting Actor winner

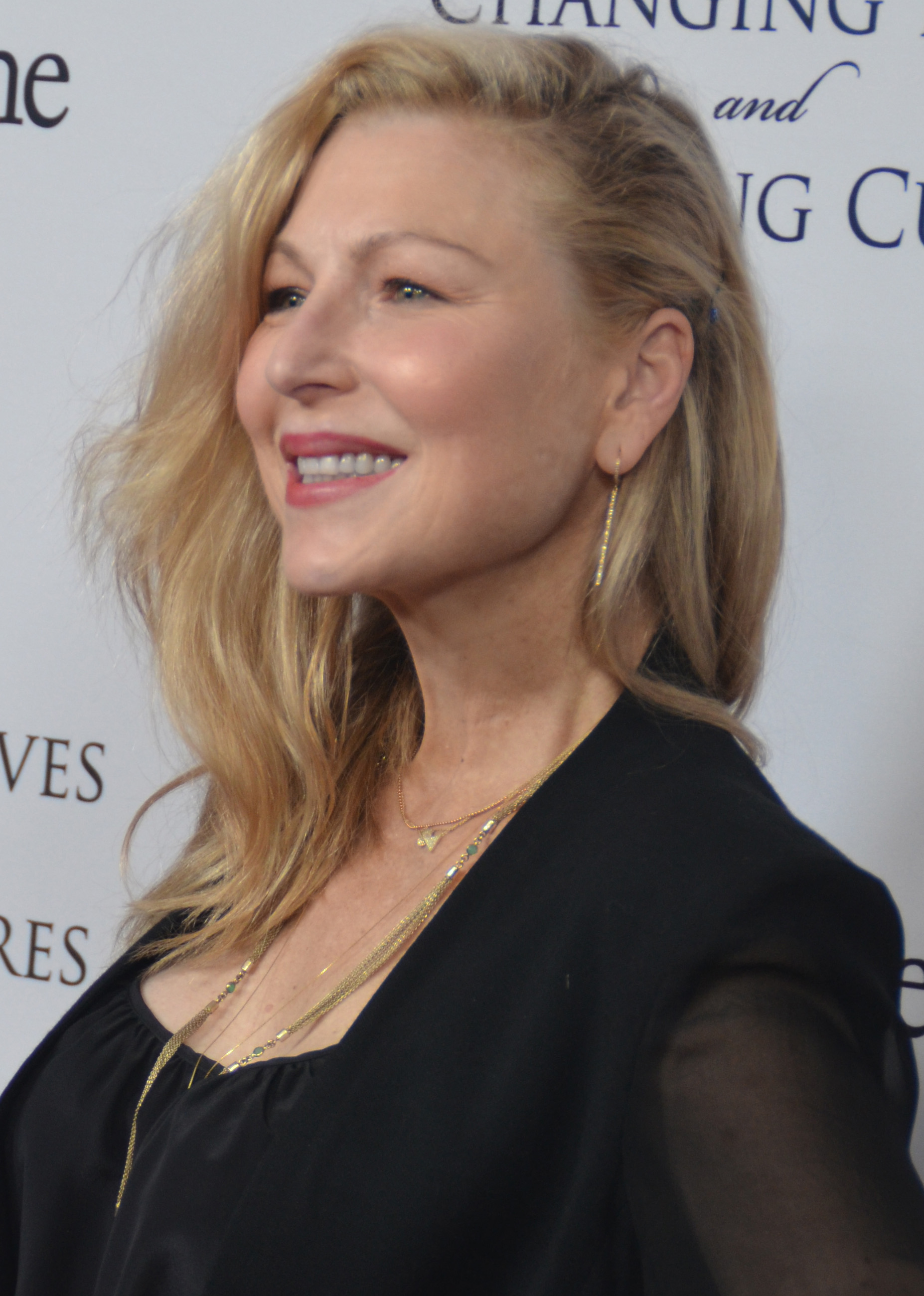
Tatum O'Neal, Best Supporting Actress winner

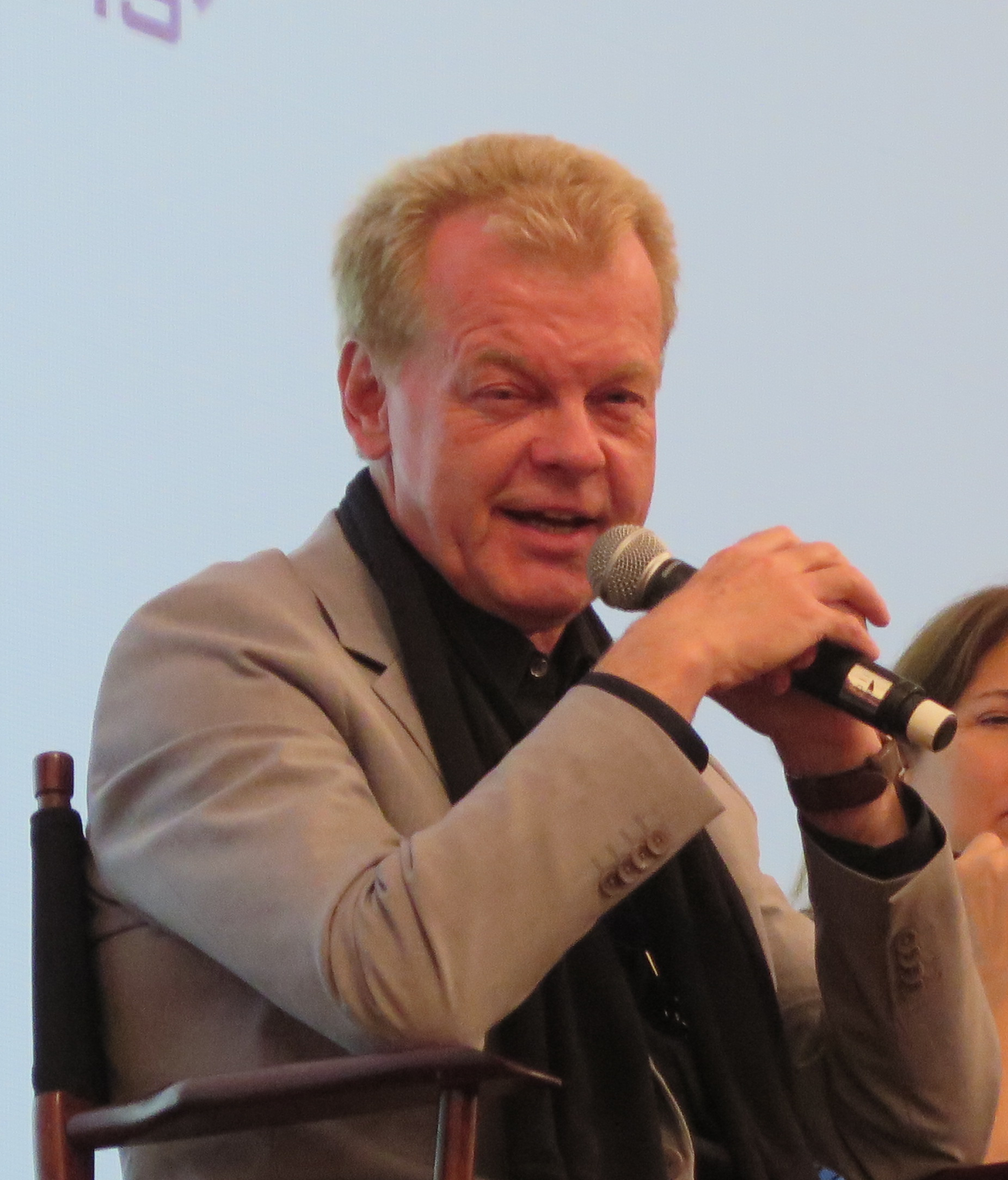
David S. Ward, Best Original Screenplay Winner

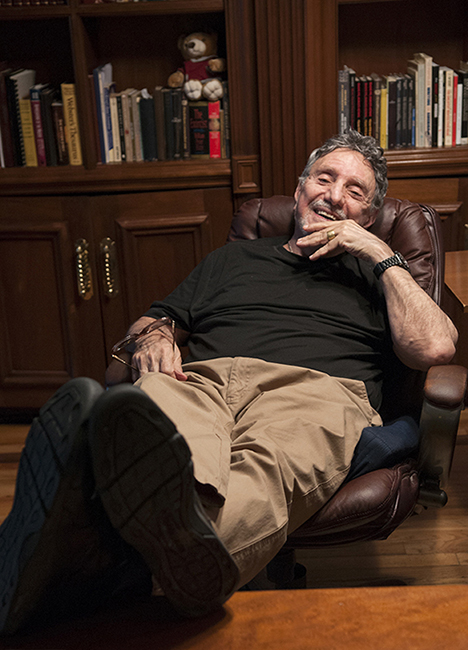
William Peter Blatty, Best Adapted Screenplay Winner

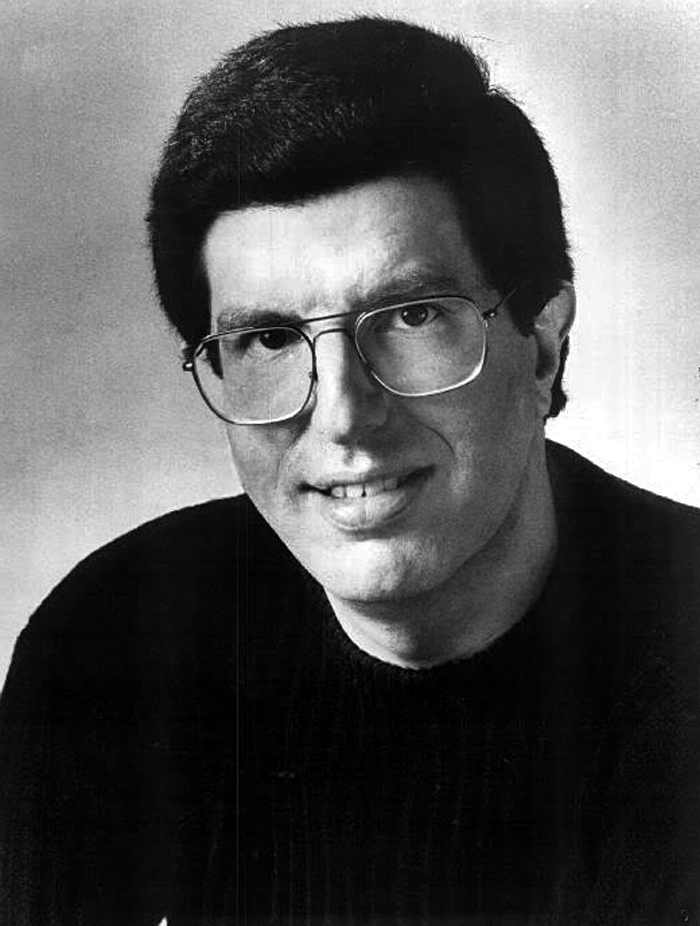
Marvin Hamlisch, Best Original Score winner, Adapted Score winner & Best Original Song co-winner

Nominations announced on February 19, 1974. Winners are listed first and highlighted in boldface.

**Best Picture**: **The Sting – Tony Bill, Julia Phillips and Michael Phillips, producers**; American Graffiti – Francis Ford Coppola, producer; Gary Kurtz, co-producer; Cries and Whispers – Ingmar Bergman, producer; The Exorcist – William Peter Blatty, producer; A Touch of Class – Melvin Frank, producer	**Best Directing**: **George Roy Hill – The Sting**; George Lucas – American Graffiti; Ingmar Bergman – Cries and Whispers; William Friedkin – The Exorcist; Bernardo Bertolucci – Last Tango in Paris
**Best Actor**: **Jack Lemmon – Save the Tiger as Harry Stoner**; Marlon Brando – Last Tango in Paris as Paul; Jack Nicholson – The Last Detail as Billy "Badass" Buddusky; Al Pacino – Serpico as Frank Serpico; Robert Redford – The Sting as Johnny Hooker	**Best Actress**: **Glenda Jackson – A Touch of Class as Vicki Allessio**; Ellen Burstyn – The Exorcist as Chris MacNeil; Marsha Mason – Cinderella Liberty as Maggie Paul; Barbra Streisand – The Way We Were as Katie Morosky; Joanne Woodward – Summer Wishes, Winter Dreams as Rita Pritchett-Walden
**Best Actor in a Supporting Role**: **John Houseman – The Paper Chase as Professor Charles W. Kingsfield Jr.**; Vincent Gardenia – Bang the Drum Slowly as Dutch; Jack Gilford – Save the Tiger as Phil; Jason Miller – The Exorcist as Damien Karras; Randy Quaid – The Last Detail as Larry Meadows	**Best Actress in a Supporting Role**: **Tatum O'Neal – Paper Moon as Addie Loggins**; Linda Blair – The Exorcist as Regan MacNeil; Candy Clark – American Graffiti as Debbie Dunham; Madeline Kahn – Paper Moon as Trixie Delight; Sylvia Sidney – Summer Wishes, Winter Dreams as Mrs. Pritchett
**Best Writing (Story and Screenplay -- Based on Factual Material or Material Not Previously Published or Produced)**: **The Sting – David S. Ward**; American Graffiti – George Lucas, Gloria Katz and Willard Huyck; Cries and Whispers – Ingmar Bergman; Save the Tiger – Steve Shagan; A Touch of Class – Melvin Frank and Jack Rose	**Best Writing (Screenplay -- Based on Material from Another Medium)**: **The Exorcist – William Peter Blatty based on his novel**; The Last Detail – Robert Towne based on the novel by Darryl Ponicsan; The Paper Chase – James Bridges based on the novel by John Jay Osborn Jr.; Paper Moon – Alvin Sargent based on the novel Addie Pray by Joe David Brown; Serpico – Waldo Salt and Norman Wexler based on the book by Peter Maas
**Best Foreign Language Film**: **Day for Night – France**; The House on Chelouche Street – Israel; L'Invitation – Switzerland; The Pedestrian – Germany (West); Turkish Delight – Netherlands	**Best Documentary (Feature)**: **The Great American Cowboy – Kieth Merrill**; Always a New Beginning – John D. Goodell; Battle of Berlin (Schlacht um Berlin) – Bengt von zur Mühlen; Journey to the Outer Limits – Alexander Grasshoff; Walls of Fire – Herbert Kline and Edmund Penney
**Best Documentary (Short Subject)**: **Princeton: A Search for Answers – Julian Krainin and DeWitt L. Sage Jr.**; Background – Carmen D'Avino; Christo's Valley Curtain – Albert Maysles and David Maysles; Four Stones for Kanemitsu – Terry Sanders and June Wayne; Paisti ag obair – Louis Marcus	**Best Short Subject (Live Action)**: **The Bolero – Allan Miller and William Fertik**; Clockmaker – Richard Gayer; Life Times Nine – Pen Densham and John Watson
**Best Short Subject (Animated)**: **Frank Film – Frank Mouris**; The Legend of John Henry – Nick Bosustow and David Adams; Pulcinella – Emanuele Luzzati and Guilo Gianini	**Best Music (Original Dramatic Score)**: **The Way We Were – Marvin Hamlisch**; Cinderella Liberty – John Williams; The Day of the Dolphin – Georges Delerue; Papillon – Jerry Goldsmith; A Touch of Class – John Cameron
**Best Music (Scoring: Original Song Score and Adaptation -or- Scoring: Adaptation)**: **The Sting – Adapted by Marvin Hamlisch**; Jesus Christ Superstar – Adapted by André Previn, Herbert W. Spencer and Andrew Lloyd Webber; Tom Sawyer – Song Score by Richard M. Sherman and Robert B. Sherman; Adapted by John Williams	**Best Music (Song)**: **"The Way We Were" — The Way We Were • Music by Marvin Hamlisch • Lyrics by Alan and Marilyn Bergman**; "All That Love Went to Waste" — A Touch of Class • Music by George Barrie • Lyrics by Sammy Cahn; "Live and Let Die" — Live and Let Die • Music and Lyrics by Paul McCartney and Linda McCartney; "Love" — Robin Hood • Music by George Bruns • Lyrics by Floyd Huddleston; "(You're So) Nice to Be Around" — Cinderella Liberty • Music by John Williams • Lyrics by Paul Williams
**Best Sound**: **The Exorcist – Robert Knudson and Chris Newman**; The Day of the Dolphin – Richard Portman and Larry Jost; The Paper Chase – Donald O. Mitchell and Larry Jost; Paper Moon – Richard Portman and Les Fresholtz; The Sting – Ronald Pierce and Robert R. Bertrand	**Best Art Direction**: **The Sting – Art Direction: Henry Bumstead; Set Decoration: James W. Payne**; Brother Sun, Sister Moon – Art Direction: Lorenzo Mongiardino and Gianni Quaranta; Set Decoration: Carmelo Patrono; The Exorcist – Art Direction: Bill Malley; Set Decoration: Jerry Wunderlich; Tom Sawyer – Art Direction: Philip Jefferies; Set Decoration: Robert De Vestel; The Way We Were – Art Direction: Stephen B. Grimes; Set Decoration: William Kiernan (posthumous nomination)
**Best Cinematography**: **Cries and Whispers – Sven Nykvist**; The Exorcist – Owen Roizman; Jonathan Livingston Seagull – Jack Couffer; The Sting – Robert Surtees; The Way We Were – Harry Stradling Jr.	**Best Costume Design**: **The Sting – Edith Head**; Cries and Whispers – Marik Vos; Ludwig – Piero Tosi; Tom Sawyer – Donfeld; The Way We Were – Dorothy Jeakins and Moss Mabry
**Best Film Editing**: **The Sting — William H. Reynolds**; American Graffiti — Verna Fields and Marcia Lucas; The Day of the Jackal — Ralph Kemplen; The Exorcist – Jordan Leondopoulos, Bud S. Smith, Evan A. Lottman and Norman Gay; Jonathan Livingston Seagull — Frank P. Keller and James Galloway

=== Honorary Awards ===
- To Henri Langlois for his devotion to the art of film, his massive contributions in preserving its past and his unswerving faith in its future.
- To Groucho Marx in recognition of his brilliant creativity and for the unequalled achievements of the Marx Brothers in the art of motion picture comedy.

=== Jean Hersholt Humanitarian Award ===
- Lew Wasserman

=== Irving G. Thalberg Memorial Award ===
- Lawrence Weingarten

== Streaking incident ==
Opel streaking during the Academy Awards ceremony in 1974, with host David Niven

During the awards ceremony a streaker named Robert Opel ran across the stage naked while flashing a peace sign with his hand. In response, host David Niven jokingly quipped, "Isn't it fascinating to think that probably the only laugh that man will ever get in his life is by stripping off and showing his shortcomings?" Terrence O'Flaherty, a columnist from San Francisco, responded by saying that "there's only one trouble with streaking—the wrong people usually do it. The ones who should have removed their clothes were Cher Bono, Twiggy and Elizabeth Taylor".

The incident would be referenced 50 years later during the 96th Academy Awards in 2024; host Jimmy Kimmel brought up the streaker and asked the audience, "can you imagine a naked man at the Oscars today?" Eventually, a "nude" John Cena, holding the award envelope for Best Costume Design over his crotch, emerged from backstage.

== Multiple nominations and awards ==
Films that received multiple nominations
Nominations	Film
10	The Exorcist
10	The Sting
6	The Way We Were
5	American Graffiti
5	Cries and Whispers
5	A Touch of Class
4	Paper Moon
3	Cinderella Liberty
3	The Last Detail
3	The Paper Chase
3	Save the Tiger
3	Tom Sawyer
2	The Day of the Dolphin
2	Jonathan Livingston Seagull
2	Last Tango in Paris
2	Serpico
2	Summer Wishes, Winter Dreams

Films that received multiple awards
Awards	Film
7	The Sting
2	The Exorcist
2	The Way We Were

== Presenters and performers ==
The following individuals, listed in order of appearance, presented awards or performed musical numbers:

=== Presenters ===
Name	Role
Hank Simms	Announcer for the 46th Academy Awards
Walter Mirisch (AMPAS President)	Gave opening remarks welcoming guests to the awards ceremony
Linda Blair; Billy Dee Williams	Presenters of the Short Subjects Awards
James Caan; Raquel Welch	Presenters of the Documentary Awards
Jack Valenti	Presenter of the Honorary Award to Henri Langlois (with Gene Kelly serving as his English-language interpreter)
Candice Bergen; Marcel Marceau	Presenters of the award for Best Sound
Richard Benjamin; Paula Prentiss	Presenters of the award for Best Film Editing
Alfred Hitchcock	Presenter of the Jean Hersholt Humanitarian Award to Lew Wasserman
Sylvia Sidney; Paul Winfield	Presenters of the award for Best Art Direction
Peter Falk; Twiggy	Presenters of the award for Best Costume Design
Peter Lawford; Cicely Tyson	Presenters of the award for Best Cinematography
Yul Brynner	Presenter of the award for Best Foreign Language Film
Donald O'Connor; Debbie Reynolds	Presenters of the award for Best Original Song and/or Adaptation Score
Cher; Henry Mancini	Presenters of the award for Best Original Dramatic Score
Marsha Mason; Neil Simon	Presenters of the award for Best Story and Screenplay Based on Factual Material or Material Not Previously Produced or Published
Angie Dickinson; Jason Miller	Presenters of the award for Best Screenplay Based on Material from Another Medium
Ann-Margret; Burt Bacharach	Presenters of the award for Best Song
Ernest Borgnine; Cybill Shepherd	Presenters of the award for Best Supporting Actor
Charles Bronson; Jill Ireland	Presenters of the award for Best Supporting Actress
Shirley MacLaine; Walter Matthau	Presenters of the award for Best Director
Katharine Hepburn	Presenter of the Irving G. Thalberg Memorial Award
Jack Lemmon	Presenter of the Honorary Award to Groucho Marx
Susan Hayward; Charlton Heston	Presenters of the award for Best Actress
Liza Minnelli; Gregory Peck	Presenters of the award for Best Actor
Elizabeth Taylor	Presenter of the award for Best Picture

=== Performers ===
Name	Role	Performed
Henry Mancini	Musical arranger and Conductor	Orchestral
Liza Minnelli	Performer	"Oscar"
Academy Awards Chorus	Performers	"Thank You Very Much" from Scrooge during the Academy Awards' 45th Anniversary montage
Dyan Cannon	Performer	"All the Love That Went to Waste" from A Touch of Class
Connie Stevens	Performer	"Live and Let Die" from Live and Let Die
Jodie Foster and Johnny Whitaker	Performers	"Love" from Robin Hood
Peggy Lee	Performer	"The Way We Were" from The Way We Were
Telly Savalas	Performer	"You're So Nice to Be Around" from Cinderella Liberty
Academy Awards Orchestra	Performers	“Hooray for Hollywood” (orchestral) during the closing credits

== See also ==
- 31st Golden Globe Awards
- 1973 in film
- 16th Grammy Awards
- 25th Primetime Emmy Awards
- 26th Primetime Emmy Awards
- 27th British Academy Film Awards
- 28th Tony Awards
