= Paper Moon =

Paper Moon may refer to:

== Film and television ==
- Paper Moon (film), a 1973 American film directed by Peter Bogdanovich based on the novel Addie Pray
- Paper Moon (American TV series), a 1974 American TV series
- "Paper Moon" (Supernatural), a 2014 episode of the television series Supernatural

== Literature ==
- Addie Pray, a 1971 novel by Joe David Brown later retitled Paper Moon
- The Paper Moon (La Luna di Carta), a 2005 novel by Andrea Camilleri

== Music ==
- Paper Moon (band), a Canadian indie rock band
- Papermoon (duo), an Austrian guitar and vocals duo
- Paper Moon (album), by the Dave Brubeck Quartet, 1981
- "Papermoon" (song), by Tommy heavenly6, 2008
- "Paper Moon", a Greek song, "Hartino to Fengaraki", by Manos Hadjidakis
- "Papermoon", a song by Our Lady Peace from Burn Burn, 2009
- Paper Moon (album), by Japanese singer Junko Ohashi.

== Other ==
- Paper Moon (photography), a photography studio prop especially popular in the early 20th century.
- Paper Moon (lantern), a lantern made of thin, brightly colored paper.

== See also ==
- "It's Only a Paper Moon", a 1933 jazz standard
- "It's Only a Paper Moon" (Star Trek: Deep Space Nine), a television episode
