= Galerie Huit =

Art collective and gallery

- Formation: 1950
- Dissolved: 1954
- Purpose: Cooperative Gallery space
- Location: 8, rue Saint-Julien-le-Pauvre, Paris, France

Galerie Huit was an art collective and gallery established by American artists in Paris in 1950. During the mid-twentieth century American artists traveled and lived in Paris to study and make art. Many of the male American artists were able to finance excursions to France because of the Servicemen's Readjustment Act of 1944 (the G.I. Bill). The city provided access to modern art as well as African art. Led by Haywood Rivers, American artists in Paris at that time united to create a cooperative gallery space to show their work.

The Galerie Huit was located at 8 rue Saint-Julien-le-Pauvre in the 5th arrondissement. It existed from 1950 through 1954 according to a catalogue for the Reina Sofia Museum, other sources state that exhibitions were held from 1950 through 1952. The space was donated by artist Robert Rosenwald after he left Paris. Artists took turns to attend to gallery visitors. Joe Downing and Al Held held their first solo exhibition at Galerie Huit. The Galerie Huit's community of artists did not mix with the Parisian art scene, despite the Galerie's central location. Picasso had visited the Galerie.

Artists associated with the gallery include:

- Oscar Chelimsky
- Carmen D'Avino
- Sam Francis
- Sidney Geist
- Simon Hantaï
- Al Held
- Raymond Hendler
- Shirley Jaffe
- Herbert Katzman
- Paul F. Keene Jr.
- Jonah Kinigstein
- Jules Olitski
- George Earl Ortman
- Marianna Pineda
- Reginald Pollack
- Haywood Rivers
- Rodney P. Abrahamson
- Shinkichi Tajiri (cofounder)
- Harold Tovish
- Hugh Weiss

In 2002 the Studio 18 Gallery in New York City held an exhibition entitled Galerie Huit: American Artists in Paris 1950-1952 featuring Galerie Huit artists. In 2018 the Reina Sofia Museum in Madrid, Spain held an exhibition entitled Lost, Loose and Loved: Foreign Artists in Paris 1944-1968 that featured several of the Galerie Huit artists.
