= William Malley =

William Malley may refer to:

- Bill Malley, American production designer and art director
- William C. Malley (c. 1868–1908), American football player and coach
