= Josephine Bond Hebron =

African-American traveler and businesswoman

Josephine (Josie) Bond Hebron (November 22, 1894 – February 1982) was a traveler, businesswoman, and writer/publisher who was African-American. She was the cousin of composer and pianist Carl Rossini Diton and sister of composer and pianist John Harvey Hebron, Marian Anderson's accompanist and piano teacher.

After starting a funeral home in Philadelphia with her husband, Paul Farwell Keene Sr., Hebron co-founded the National Association of Negro Business and Professional Women's Clubs, Incorporated (NANBPWC, Inc.).

In 1939 Hebron wrote and published the Directory of Negro business and professional women of Philadelphia and vicinity.

Hebron and Keene had two sons and two daughters, including artist Paul F. Keene Jr.
