= Kings Go Forth =

1958 film by Delmer Daves

- 1958 theatrical poster
- Directed by: Delmer Daves
- Written by: Joe David Brown (novel); Merle Miller
- Produced by: Frank Ross
- Starring: Frank Sinatra; Tony Curtis; Natalie Wood
- Cinematography: Daniel L. Fapp
- Edited by: William B. Murphy
- Music by: Elmer Bernstein
- Distributed by: United Artists
- Release dates: June 14, 1958 (Premiere); June 28, 1958
- Running time: 109 minutes
- Country: United States
- Language: English
- Box office: $2.8 million

Kings Go Forth is a 1958 American black-and-white World War II film starring Frank Sinatra, Tony Curtis, and Natalie Wood. The screenplay was written by Merle Miller from the 1956 novel of the same name by Joe David Brown, and the film was directed by Delmer Daves. The plot involves friends of different backgrounds manning an observation post in Southern France who fall in love with the same French girl. She proves to be of American Mulatto ancestry. Themes of racism and miscegenation provide the conflict elements between the leading characters, something that was out of the ordinary for films of the time, while the setting during the so-called Champagne Campaign remains unique.

== Plot ==
In the final year of World War II, units of the United States Army are in the foothills of the Alps between France and Italy, trying to dislodge a unit of German soldiers from a supply post in the middle of a small village. 1st Lt. Sam Loggins is in charge of an artillery observation unit that has just lost its radioman. A truckload of fresh young soldiers arrives, one of whom, Corporal Britt Harris admits to radio training and experience—Harris is immediately appointed the unit's radioman by Loggins.

Harris is a ladies man and a schemer, acquiring girlfriends, food, and other luxury items. He is the son of a wealthy textile mill owner in New Jersey; in order to avoid criminal charges of trying to bribe a member of the local Draft Board, Harris "volunteered" for combat duty in Europe. He shows bravery while rescuing a group of men trapped in a minefield and while attacking a German bunker single-handed, but Loggins still has his reservations about him.

The Colonel grants Loggins and his unit leave in the seaside town of Nice. While walking by himself on a quay, Loggins is attracted to Monique Blair (Natalie Wood). They go to dinner, and she explains she was born to American parents, but has lived in France since she was a small child. Loggins asks her to meet him in the same cafe the next week. He waits, but Monique doesn't show, and he walks out despondent, only to be asked to have a drink by an older American woman who has apparently been waiting for him. It is Monique's mother, who was checking him out. She takes him to her palatial home to join Monique. The two spend a great deal of time together after that. One night he tells her he loves her, and Monique finally reveals to him that she is afraid to get involved with a US soldier because her now-dead father was a Negro, and she has seen the general bigotry all American soldiers seem to have. Loggins is confused and leaves, not sure about his feelings.

After a week of anguished consideration, Loggins decides to put aside the former prejudices he would have had about Monique's parentage and goes to see her. She and her mother are delighted to see him. Loggins invites Monique to go out on a date with him. They end up going to a smoky jazz cafe, where they are surprised to see Harris play a fantastic jazz solo on a trumpet, to the acclaim of the entire French crowd. Harris joins Loggins and Monique at their table, and Loggins is left on the sidelines as Harris and Monique are immediately drawn to each other. Harris and Monique dance closely late into the night. After Loggins takes Monique home, she asks Loggins to tell Harris about her Negro father.

Back on surveillance duty of a town where the Germans have set up, Loggins does so, and it doesn't seem to bother Harris. Then the Germans begin shelling their observation position. After three days of shelling, Loggins suggests to Harris that they should infiltrate the village on a covert mission to observe from a church tower in the middle of town; Loggins goes in to see the Colonel who says he will pass the idea up to Headquarters.

The next weekend, Loggins and Harris return to Nice to visit Monique. Once again, Loggins is forced to the sidelines as the handsome and smooth-talking Harris takes over. Loggins returns to his hotel room alone. Harris and Monique stay out most of the night. When Harris returns to the hotel, he tells Loggins he has asked Monique to marry him, and she has said yes. Loggins is shattered, but he puts on a brave face. He tells Harris about the paperwork he will need to fill out to get the army's permission to marry. When they return to their unit, Harris immediately asks for the marriage permission form. Two months pass, and Harris still hasn't received an answer from the army on his request to marry. On his way to report to the Colonel, while talking to Corporal Lindsay, Loggins finds out that Harris had only picked up the paperwork three weeks earlier, and had still not submitted it. In fact, Harris had told the corporal that the whole thing was a gag. Loggins is furious when he hears this.

Thereafter, the Colonel tells Loggins that Headquarters has approved the covert operation of Loggins with Harris as his radioman. Loggins asks for a few hours leave for both of them to take care of some personal matters in Nice, to which the Colonel agrees.

Loggins and Harris go to the Blair mansion, and Loggins forces Harris to admit to Monique that Harris is not going to marry her. Monique runs away in tears. Harris tries to explain himself to Loggins ("it was a kick"), and Loggins punches him. Loggins then goes out to find Monique. It turns out she had tried to drown herself, but is saved by a fisherman.

Back at the Army base, Loggins and Harris prepare for their mission. Soon after leaving, Loggins tells Harris he is going to kill him. Harris responds that reaction "works both ways".

On the mission, they encounter and kill a German soldier together. The duo establish themselves in the church tower, call in and report their observations, especially that a hidden section of the village contains an enormous German artillery/ammo dump. Loggins sends an order back to the base to begin a bombardment that will certainly destroy most of the village. They leave the tower, and are soon discovered by a German patrol. Harris is shot by the Germans and dies after Loggins drags him out of the line of fire, but Loggins is pinned down. The German officers, panicking at the thought of American soldiers in the village, order an immediate evacuation. Hearing this, Loggins grabs the radio and tells the American artillery to begin firing. Shells fall on the village and the ammo dump, and everything blows up.

The movie ends with Loggins relating how he was found under the rubble still alive by US troops, and brought to a hospital, where his right arm was amputated. He had got two letters from Monique. In one of them she says that she has learned that Harris was killed. She also tells Loggins that her mother has died. When Loggins is finally released from the hospital after many months, he decides to go to Nice to visit Monique one last time before returning to the States. He finds that she is now heading up a school for war orphans. She invites Loggins to come into one of the classrooms. As a tribute to Loggins and all the American soldiers who fought to free France, the children sing a song of appreciation. During the singing, Monique and Loggins look earnestly at each other.

== Cast ==
- Frank Sinatra as 1st Lt. Sam Loggins
- Tony Curtis as Sgt. Britt Harris
- Natalie Wood as Monique Blair
- Leora Dana as Mrs. Blair
- Karl Swenson as The Colonel
- Ann Codee as Mme. Brieux
- Eddie Ryder as Cpl. Lindsay (as Edward Ryder)
- Jacques Berthe as Jean-François Dauvah, Boy

== Release ==
The film had its premiere on June 14, 1958, in Monaco.

== Music ==
The music was written by Elmer Bernstein. It includes Frank Sinatra's song Monique, with lyrics by Sammy Cahn.

== Reception ==
At the US box office, Kings Go Forth was a moderate hit that was moderately well received by critics.
