= Paper Moon (American TV series) =

- Starring: Christopher Connelly; Jodie Foster
- Opening theme: "It's Only a Paper Moon"
- Composers: Harold Arlen, Yip Harburg, and Billy Rose
- Country of origin: United States
- Original language: English
- No. of seasons: 1
- No. of episodes: 13

Production
- Executive producer: Anthony Wilson
- Producer: Robert Stambler
- Running time: ca. 25 minutes
- Production companies: The Directors Company; Paramount Television

Original release
- Network: ABC
- Release: September 12 – December 19, 1974

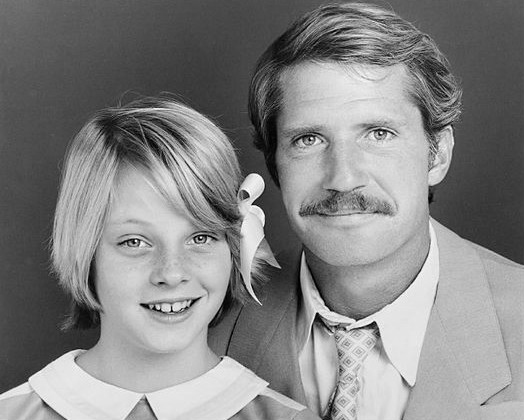
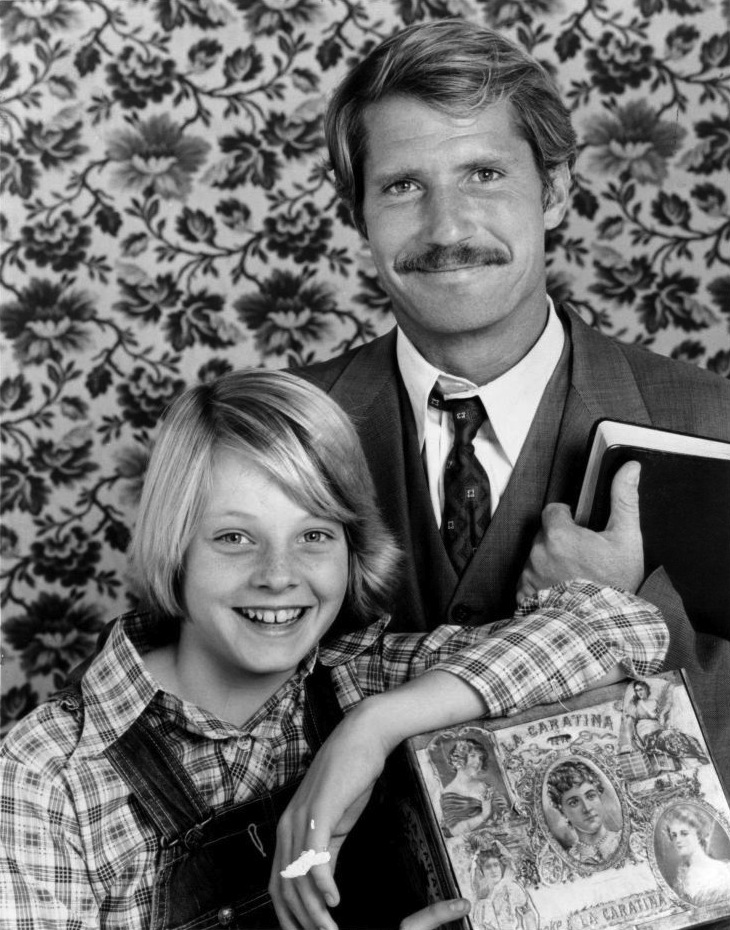
Jodie Foster and Christopher Connelly in publicity photos for Paper Moon

Paper Moon is an American sitcom which aired for one season on ABC in 1974. The series starred Christopher Connelly and Jodie Foster.

== Premise ==
Moses "Moze" Pray is a con man and traveling Bible salesman who roams the Midwestern United States in his 1931 Ford Model A roadster during the Great Depression of the 1930s, flim-flamming people with his gold-embossed Bibles. Tagging along with him is Adelaide "Addie" Loggins, a precocious 11-year-old girl who is convinced that Moze is her father – although he denies it – and calls herself "Addie Pray." Usually only a step ahead of the law, they always are working one fast-buck scheme or another, although they never have much money. They get on one another's nerves but have a strong bond, and it often is up to Addie to bail Moze out.

== Cast ==
- Christopher Connelly as Moses "Moze" Pray
- Jodie Foster as Adelaide "Addie" Loggins ("Addie Pray")

== Production ==
A gentle comedy, Paper Moon was based on the successful 1973 movie of the same title, which in turn was based on Addie Pray, a 1971 novel by Joe David Brown which was retitled Paper Moon after the release of the movie. The series was filmed on location in Kansas. For its theme song, it used an authentic 1933 recording of "It's Only a Paper Moon," composed by Harold Arlen with lyrics by Yip Harburg and Billy Rose.

The Directors Company and Paramount Television produced Paper Moon. Anthony Wilson was the television show's executive producer and Robert Stambler produced it. Episode directors included James Frawley, Herschel Daugherty, Alex March, Jerry Paris, and Jack Shea.

Paper Moon was Jodie Foster's last appearance as a regular in a television series for nearly 50 years. Her next regular role in a television series did not come until 2024, when she portrayed Police Chief Liz Danvers in True Detective: Night Country.

== Broadcast history ==
Paper Moon premiered in the United States on September 12, 1974, on ABC. It suffered from low ratings and ran for only 13 episodes, the last of which aired on December 19, 1974. Reruns of the show then were broadcast in its regular time slot until January 2, 1975. It aired at 8:30 p.m. on Thursday throughout its run.

In the United Kingdom, Paper Moon premiered on September 24, 1974. It aired on BBC2 on Tuesdays at 9:00 pm. In Canada, Paper Moon aired on CBC.

== Episodes ==
No.	Title	Directed by	Written by	Original release date
1	"Settling"	James Frawley	Alvin Sargent	September 12, 1974
Moze prefers the traveling life, but Addie is tired of life on the run, so she talks Moze into using his "special method" to get $1,000 that they can use to buy a house she has fallen in love with and settle down. Guest stars: Harry Geldard, Scotty Philip, and Ed Mullaney.
2	"Second Prize"	Donald Wrye	Carol Sobieski	September 19, 1974
The pilot episode for Paper Moon. Needing money for car repairs, Moze enters Addie in a Shirley Temple talent contest — and makes sure that she will win second prize.
3	"Imposter"	James Frawley	Carol Sobieski	September 26, 1974
Moze tries to pass off Addie as the long-missing granddaughter of a tough and reclusive millionaire so that the man will give Addie all the advantages due his granddaughter, but the plan falls apart when Moze meets his match. Guest stars: Jeff Corey, David Huddleston, Don Clippinger, and Henry Wolf.
4	"Manly Arts"	Jerry Paris	George Kirgo	October 3, 1974
Angry with Moze for losing all their money to a pool hustler, Addie enters him in a local boxing match with a prize of $100 after he brags about his boxing prowess.
5	"Birthday"	Jack Shea	Alvin Sargent	October 10, 1974
Addie tells Moze that on her upcoming birthday she would like to "celebrate big" — by placing a telephone call to President Franklin D. Roosevelt.
6	"Long Division"	Jack Shea	Pamela Herbert Chais	October 17, 1974
A silver-tongued, college-educated drifter promises to teach Addie long division in exchange for Moze teaching him the confidence business – and before long the man begins to drive Moze and Addie apart. Guest stars: Lawrence Pressman and Mary Jane Hampton.
7	"Gimme That Old Time Relation"	Herschel Daugherty	Mary Kay Place & Linda Bloodworth	October 24, 1974
Also known as "Old Time Relatives." Inspired by both love and the sight of collection plates laden with money, Moze decides that he and Addie will join two sisters – one of them an old friend – who run tent revivals. Guest stars: Nellie Bellflower and P.J. Johnson.
8	"Harvest"	Alex March	Bill Stratton	October 31, 1974
Moze is conned into serving as the advance man for Buffalo Tillman's Harvesting Crews, a wheat-harvesting company which he is told will arrive the next day.
9	"Bonnie and Clyde"	James Frawley	Juanita Bartlett	November 7, 1974
Ignoring Addie's warning, Moze cons townspeople into believing that he works as an advance man for Bonnie and Clyde — and then Bonnie and Clyde unexpectedly arrive. Guest stars: Robert F. Lyons and Linda Haynes.
10	"Visions of Las Vegas"	James Frawley	Robert Foster	November 14, 1974
Moze and Addie attend the funeral of Indiana Harry, the man who taught Moze the con business. Moze gives a moving eulogy that brings tears to Harry's eyes – because Harry is alive and still running cons.
11	"Who Is M.P. Sellers?"	James Frawley	Howard Rayfiel	November 28, 1974
Addie has her heart set on learning her father's identity when she and Moze arrive in Ophelia, Kansas, where she was born – and she tries to prove Moze is her father.
12	"Green Goods"	Jerry Paris	E.V. Cunningham	December 12, 1974
Moze and Addie are excited that they have quintupled their cash on hand when a cheerful bootlegger's widow falls easily for Moze's Bible con and pays him in gold certificates – but then the woman arouses Addie's suspicions.
13	"Day Off"	James Frawley & Herb Wallerstein	Benjamin Palestrina	December 19, 1974
Addie begins to question the way of life she and Moze lead, and while Moze is busy, she takes time off to think about life and meets a remarkable teacher at the local schoolhouse.

- Other guest stars: Nellie Bellflower, Lucille Benson, Lynn Carlin, Jeff Donnell, Ronnie Claire Edwards, Bert Freed, Burton Gilliam, Dabbs Greer, Jacques Hampton, Rick Hurst, Kay E. Kuter, Jon Lormer, Strother Martin, Vern Porter, Peggy Rea, and Anthony Zerbe.
