= The Bolero =

1973 film

- Directed by: Allan Miller; William Fertik
- Produced by: Allan Miller; William Fertik
- Starring: Zubin Mehta
- Cinematography: Michael A. Jones
- Edited by: Sarah Stein
- Music by: Los Angeles Philharmonic Orchestra
- Distributed by: Pyramid Films
- Release date: 1973
- Running time: 26 minutes
- Country: United States
- Language: English

The Bolero is a 1973 American short documentary film directed by Allan Miller and William Fertik. It won an Oscar at the 46th Academy Awards in 1974 for Best Short Subject.

== Film content ==
The film captures the behind-the-scenes preparations of the musicians from the Los Angeles Philharmonic Orchestra as they get ready to showcase Maurice Ravel's orchestral masterpiece, Boléro. Some musicians share their thoughts while adjusting their chairs and music stands. Conductor Zubin Mehta also provides insights, and the film conveys the atmosphere of the rehearsals. The pinnacle of the documentary is the breathtaking performance of Boléro by the talented musicians.

== Cast ==
- Zubin Mehta, conductor
- Ernest Fleischmann, executive director L.A. Philharmonic
- Anne Diener Giles, flute
- Michele Zukovsky, clarinet
- Merritt Buxbaum, E flat clarinet
- Alan Goodman, bassoon
- Robert DiVall, trumpet
- Franklin Stokes, saxophone
- Henry Sigismonti, French horn
- H. Dennis Smith, trombone
- Miles Zentner, piccolo
- Los Angeles Philharmonic Orchestra

== Availability ==
The Bolero was released on DVD by First Run Features alongside In Search of Cezanne, another documentary short, this time about French pre-cubist artist Paul Cézanne, on May 22, 2007.

== See also ==
- Boléro
- Allegro Non Troppo - 1976 animated film that also famously used The Bolero
