= Daisy Miller (film) =

1974 film by Peter Bogdanovich

- Theatrical release poster
- Directed by: Peter Bogdanovich
- Screenplay by: Frederic Raphael
- Based on: Daisy Miller by Henry James
- Produced by: Peter Bogdanovich
- Starring: Cybill Shepherd; Barry Brown; Cloris Leachman; Mildred Natwick; Eileen Brennan
- Cinematography: Alberto Spagnoli
- Edited by: Verna Fields
- Music by: Angelo Francesco Lavagnino
- Production companies: The Directors Company; Copa de Oro
- Distributed by: Paramount Pictures
- Release date: May 22, 1974
- Running time: 91 minutes
- Country: United States
- Language: English
- Budget: $2.2 million

Daisy Miller is a 1974 American drama film produced and directed by Peter Bogdanovich, and starring Cybill Shepherd in the title role. The screenplay by Frederic Raphael is based on the 1878 novella by Henry James. The lavish period costumes and sets were done by Ferdinando Scarfiotti, Mariolina Bono and John Furniss.

Bogdanovich later said he wished he had not made the film, claiming "It's a good picture, there's nothing wrong with it", but said "I knew when we were making it that it wasn't commercial" and "if I had been smart about things... I would not have done something so completely uncommercial." He says the film's financial failure "threw the studio's confidence in me, that I would do a picture like that instead of thinking only in terms of box office" and "helped fuck up the next two pictures... they came out not the way I wanted."

== Synopsis ==
Daisy Miller is a beautiful, flirtatious, nouveau riche young American visiting a Swiss spa with her nervously timid, talkative mother and spoiled, xenophobic younger brother Randolph. There she meets upper class expatriate American, Frederick Winterbourne, who is warned about her reckless ways with men by his dowager aunt Mrs. Costello.

When the two are reunited in Rome, Winterbourne tries to convince Daisy that her keeping company with suave Italian Mr. Giovanelli, who has no status among the locals, will destroy her reputation with the expatriates, including socialite Mrs. Walker, who is offended by her behavior and vocal about her disapproval. Daisy is too carelessly naive to take either of them seriously.

Winterbourne is torn between his feelings for Daisy and his respect for social customs, and he is unable to tell how she really feels about him beneath her facade of willful abandon. When he meets her and Giovanelli in the Colosseum one night, he decides such behavior makes him unable to love her and lets her know it. Winterbourne warns her against the malaria, against which she has failed to take precautions. She becomes ill, and dies a few days later. At her funeral, Giovanelli tells Winterbourne that she was the most "innocent". Winterbourne wonders whether his ignorance of American customs may have contributed to her fate.

== Main cast ==
- Cybill Shepherd as Daisy Miller
- Barry Brown as Frederick Winterbourne
- Cloris Leachman as Mrs. Ezra B. Miller
- Mildred Natwick as Mrs. Costello
- Eileen Brennan as Mrs. Walker
- James McMurtry as Randolph C. Miller
- Duilio Del Prete as Mr. Giovanelli
- Nicholas Jones as Charles
- George Morfogen as Eugeno

== Production notes ==
=== Development ===
Peter Bogdanovich had a production deal with The Directors Company at Paramount Studios under which he could make whatever film he wanted provided it was under a certain budget. This company was the idea of Charles Bluhdorn, chairman of Gulf and Western, who owned Paramount at the time. Peter Bart, then working at Paramount, remembers:

Bogdanovich called me soon after completing Paper Moon to tell me he was going to introduce me to a filmmaker whose work the company should next foster. He appeared a day later in the presence of Orson Welles, corpulent and glowering, who, at the time, was neither young nor promising... Bogdanovich felt Welles had one more Citizen Kane in him; the other directors disagreed, as did I. Welles and Bogdanovich had formed a bond, however, and during their lengthy conversations, Welles had spoken glowingly of a novel by Henry James called Daisy Miller, which he felt was a romantic classic. Bogdanovich, who was making a habit at the time of falling in love, heard Welles' comments in the context of a potential film. My instinct was that he was simply urging Bogdanovich to read the novel; an erudite man, Welles' literary recommendations were definitely worth listening to. To my surprise, however, Bogdanovich instantly started prepping a movie based on Daisy Miller to star his girlfriend Cybill Shepherd -- an idea that did not stir much enthusiasm within the Directors' Company. At the time, I recall telling myself, this company won't be around for long. The prediction proved to be correct.

Bogdanovich's other partners in the Directors Company were Francis Ford Coppola and William Friedkin. Friedkin later wrote that Coppola "remained neutral" on the idea of making Daisy Miller but Friedkin was opposed. "I told Peter he shouldn't make it for our company. We had promised Bludhorn "commercial" films." However Bogdanovich went ahead anyway. Friedkin later said he was encouraged to do this by Frank Yablans of Paramount, who never liked the idea of the Directors Company and wanted it to fail.

Bogdanovich later recalled:

I thought that it would not be a very commercial picture, but I thought we'd made three in a row; what's wrong with making one that wasn't so commercial? This is not a good way to think. [LAUGH] Howard Hawks had warned me, "Peter, make pictures that make money", is what he said. It seems fairly obvious, but I should have listened to him... My partners, [Francis Ford] Coppola and [William] Friedkin, were annoyed that I made it 'cause they saw it as a vanity production from my girlfriend. I thought it was rather a touching story. In retrospect, I should have probably done Rambling Rose which was a possibility at that time.

=== Casting ===
Bogdanovich later said he asked Orson Welles to direct Cybill Shepherd and Bogdanovich in the lead roles but Welles refused:

He encouraged me to do it which maybe was a double-edged sword but anyway Barry Brown was so right for the part that it was scary. But it was also a problem because he just wasn't very personable and the part needed somebody with a little more personality, but y'know, he was the part, he sure was Winterbourne. Poor Barry. He killed himself really, with booze... He had a kind of intelligence and he was a very bright kid but he was so self-destructive. But he was very much like Winterbourne, he was definitely "winter born."

=== Shooting ===
The film started shooting on 20 August 1973. Production took place on location in Rome and Vevey in the canton of Vaud in Switzerland. Larry McMurtry's son had a support role. During the shoot, Rex Reed visited the set and wrote a hostile piece on the director and star.

Bogdanovich said later "I remember watching dailies of Daisy Miller in Rome or Switzerland and thinking to myself, saying out loud 'This is beautiful, but I don't know who's going to want to see it.' And boy, was I right. Don't forget, this was before the Merchant Ivory (Merchant Ivory Productions)."

Bogdanovich later recalls his partners at the Directors Company were not happy with the film:

They thought it was a kind of a vanity production to show Cybill off. If I'd wanted to do that I would have done something else. That was a pretty difficult role, and I thought she was awfully good in it. What some people didn't realize is that that was the way a girl like that would have been in 1875. She was from New York, she was a provincial girl. If you read the story that's what she is. If you read the original novel we hardly added anything. The movie is exactly the book. I added one sequence that I wrote that Freddy Raphael had nothing to do with. In fact Freddy Raphael had nothing to do with that script, it was so funny. There's two things he wrote. One idea was the little miniature painter and the other thing was having that scene play in the baths...Everything else was the book and I couldn't use his script cause it was really way over the top. Anyway, that's another story. We went to arbitration in England cause Freddy's English and so they were a little partial to him. They said I could have billing but it would have to say "Additional Dialogue by", and I said I'm not going to give myself that.

When the film was completed Bogdanovich recalls showing it to studio executives:

Yablans, the new head of the studio came over to me and I said "What do you think?" He said "It's all right." I said "Is that all you have to say?" "Well what do you want me to say?" I said "It's just all right?" He said "It's fine, it's good but you are Babe Ruth and you just bunted." From a commercial point of view, he was right. It was not a picture that was ever going to be a big hit unless you released it today. It got very good notices. People remember it as having gotten bad notices but the truth is that Paper Moon got fairly mixed notices. The New York Times didn't like it, Time didn't like it. On the other hand The New York Times raved about Daisy Miller, but it was just not a commercial picture in its day plus at that point Paramount changed hands, Barry Diller came in, Frank was out, it fell between the cracks, and nobody really pushed it. I like the picture. I think it was pretty daring.

== Reception ==
Variety described the film as "a dud" and added "Cybill Shepherd is miscast in the title role. Frederic Raphael's adaptation of the Henry James story doesn't play. The period production by Peter Bogdanovich is handsome. But his direction and concept seem uncertain and fumbled. Supporting performances by Mildred Natwick, Eileen Brennan and Cloris Leachman are, respectively, excellent, outstanding, and good."

The New York Times said the movie "works amazingly well." It congratulated Shepherd for [catching] "the gaiety and the directness of Daisy, the spontaneity of a spoiled but very likable person. She also manages to be thoughtless without playing dumb or dizzy, and to convey that mixture of recklessness and innocence that bewildered the other Jamesian characters." Bogdanovich was praised for providing "a sensitive glimpse of the hypocrisies and contradictions of the past—without one whiff of nostalgia." (Vincent Canby later named it one of the 11 best films of the year.)

TV Guide rated it one out of a possible four stars and calls it "truly a dud in spite of handsome sets and an intelligent writing job. James is, to say the least, hard to adapt for the screen, but this job becomes hopeless because of Shepherd's shallow performance."

Time Out London wrote "Bogdanovich's nervous essay in the troubled waters of Henry James, where American innocence and naiveté are in perpetual conflict with European decadence and charm, reveals him to be less an interpreter of James than a translator of him into the brusquer world of Howard Hawks. The violence done James in this is forgivable—indeed, Cybill Shepherd's transformation of Daisy into a Hawks heroine is strangely successful—but as a result there is no real social conflict in the film, and it becomes just a period variant on The Last Picture Show, without the vigour of that film or the irony of the original James novel."

Henry Hathaway admired Bogdanovich's films but thought his casting Shepherd in Daisy Miller was "bad judgment".

Daisy Miller holds a 67% rating on Rotten Tomatoes, based on 15 reviews. On Metacritic, it has a score of 48%, based on reviews from 7 critics, indicating "mixed or average reviews".

=== Legacy ===
The original edition of The New York Times Guide to the Best 1,000 Movies Ever Made, published in 1999, included the film.

Filmink magazine argued, "If it had come along in the 1990s, I think it would have been a hit on that studio indie circuit that wasn’t really around in the 1970s for English language films. Failed to launch two new stars: Barry Brown and Duilio Del Prete."

Quentin Tarantino later said, "the film starts off a little bizarre. The tone at the beginning is a little off putting. You’re not quite sure if it works. But the film gains power as it progresses, and builds to a gut punch ending...[the film] is very funny, yet it leaves the viewer remarkably sad as you watch the final credits fade up...The movie plays like the entertaining and breezy classic adaptations that came out of Hollywood in the thirties and forties...Peter tackles the material in a similar way that you can imagine Howard Hawks dealing with the assignment in the forties."

== Home video ==
The film was released on DVD by Paramount. Later on, a Blu-ray by Kino Lorber was released on May 21, 2024.

== Accolades ==
The film was nominated for the Academy Award for Best Costume Design but lost to The Great Gatsby.

== See also ==
- List of American films of 1974
- Merchant-Ivory
