= Joe David Brown =

American journalist (1915–1976)

Joe David Brown (May 12, 1915 – April 22, 1976) was an American novelist and journalist from Birmingham, Alabama. He drew memorably from his own life to compose his fiction - his grandfather's role as a minister, his own knowledge of confidence games from his work as a reporter, his World War II experiences, and his residence on journalistic assignment in India. He is particularly remembered for the title character of his novel Addie Pray, the young "Mistress of the Con Game" during the Great Depression in the Deep South; it was adapted into the film Paper Moon.

== Biography ==
Brown was born in Birmingham, the son of William Samuel Brown, a newspaper publisher, and Lucille Lokey Brown. At age 20, he became a police reporter for the Birmingham Post and in the same year (1935) married Mildred Harbour, with whom he had two sons, David (named Joe David Brown after his father and also a journalist) and Ted. At age 21, Brown became city editor of the Dothan Eagle. From 1935 to 1939, he worked for newspapers in Atlanta, Georgia; Chattanooga, Tennessee; and St. Louis, Missouri.

In 1939, he began working for the New York Daily News, but his time there was interrupted in 1942 by World War II, in which he served in the U.S. Army with the 460th Parachute Field Artillery Battalion (460th PFAB). Brown was one of the first men to parachute into Southern France, in August 1944. He received a battlefield commission as second lieutenant and was awarded the Purple Heart and Croix de Guerre with Palm.

His first marriage ended in 1943 while he was still in the service. In 1945, while recovering from combat injuries, he met and married his second wife, Frances O'Reilly, with whom he had one daughter, Gilbreth. Brown returned to the Daily News, then from 1949 to 1957 was a foreign correspondent for Time and Life, serving in New Delhi, India; Paris, France; London; and Moscow. In 1957, he became a freelance writer. In the '60s, he returned to work for Time as a contributing editor; he also edited several books for Time-Life.

== Filmed novels ==
Three of Brown's better-known novels became the basis of movies. Stars in My Crown (1947), based on his childhood experiences with his minister grandfather, was made into a movie by the same name in 1949. Kings Go Forth was made into a movie in 1958. His final novel, Addie Pray (1971), the story of 11-year-old con artist Addie and her older partner Long Boy, was made into the movie Paper Moon (1973), starring Ryan O'Neal and his daughter Tatum; the film then served as the basis for a TV series of the same name, starring Jodie Foster. Brown's other, earlier novels are less known. The Freeholder (1949) is about an indentured servant's quest for freedom in the American South. Kings Go Forth (1956) draws upon Brown's military experiences (and also was made into a movie released in 1958), and Glimpse of a Stranger (1968) highlights the contrast between the cultures of India and the United States.

Brown died on April 26, 1976, at his home in Georgia.

== Works ==
Novels

- Stars In My Crown (1947)
- The Freeholder (1949)
- Kings Go Forth (1956)
- Glimpse of a Stranger (1968)
- Addie Pray (aka Paper Moon) (1971)

Short stories

- "Grandpa and the Miracle Grindstone" (1956; Curtis Publishing Company)

as Editor

- India (1961)
- The Hippies (1967)
- Can Christianity Survive? (1967)
- Sex in the 60s (1968)
