= Marianna Pineda =

American sculptor

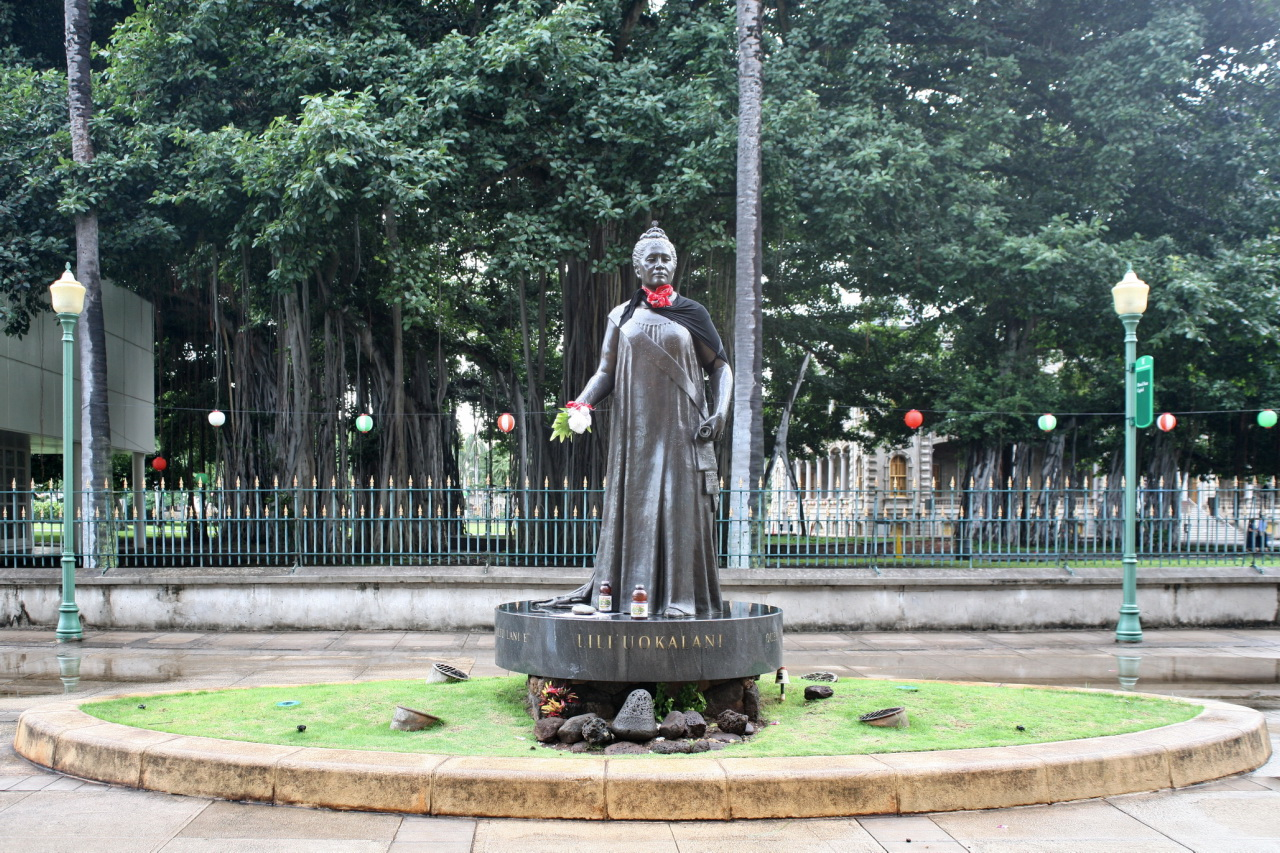
- "Queen Lili'uokalani,"on the south side of the Hawai’i State Capitol, bronze, 1980.
- Born: Marianna Packard; March 10, 1925; Evanston, Illinois, U.S.
- Died: November 24, 1996 (aged 71); Boston, Massachusetts, U.S.
- Other name: Marianna Tovish
- Education: Cranbrook Academy of Art; Bennington College; University of California, Berkeley; Columbia University
- Notable work: Queen Lili'uokalani, The Accusative
- Style: Figurative
- Movement: Realism
- Spouse: Harold Tovish (m. 1946)
- Awards: Gold Medals, National Academy of Design (1987, 1988); Gold Medals/Prizes, National Sculpture Society, 1986, 1988, 1991; Prize, 62nd American Exhibition of Painting and Sculpture, 1957

Marianna Pineda (née Marianna Packard; 1925–1996) was an American sculptor, who worked in a stylized realist tradition.

The female figure was typically her subject matter, often in a striking or expressive pose. Major work included an eight-foot bronze statue of the Hawaiian Queen Lili’uokalani, for a site between the Hawaii State Capitol and Iolani Palace, which she used as the subject matter of Search for the Queen, a 1996 documentary she produced on the life of her subject and the sculpture-making process. Other significant work includes the figure of a seated woman in The Accusative, for a site in the Honolulu, Hawaii offices of the Commission on the Status of Women.

== Biography ==
Marianna Packard was born in 1925, in Evanston, Illinois. Born with the surname Packard, Pineda renamed herself after watching Frederico Garcia Lorca's play about Mariana Pineda, the 19th century liberal heroine executed for helping her revolutionary lover escape execution.

She made her first plasticine torso by eight years old, was teaching a summer camp art class by age 15, as well as taking drawing lessons on the weekend. She attributed her early interest in sculpture to the many she saw at multiple World's Fair visits, as well as on travels with her mother to Greece and Egypt, both places where sculpture dominates.

She studied with Carl Milles in the summer of 1942 at the Cranbrook Academy of Art; with Simon Moselsio, 1942–1943 at Bennington College; with Raymond Puccinelli from 1943 to 1945 at the University of California, Berkeley; with Oronzio Maldarelli from 1945 to 1946 at Columbia University; and with Ossip Zadkine in Paris from 1949 to 1950.

== Personal life ==
Pineda developed her sense of adventure by traveling with her mother in the U.S., Europe, the Middle East, and to such far-flung places as Galapagos, the Marquesans, Polynesia and New Guinea. It was on trips to Greece and Egypt where Pineda first became entranced by sculpture, and not only became a sculptor herself, but also married sculptor Harold Tovish.

Marianna Pineda died November 24, 1996, of pancreatic cancer at her home in Boston.

== Public collections ==
- Addison Gallery of American Art at Phillips Academy
- Boston Conservatory Music at Berklee
- Boston Public Library
- Williams College
- Boston University
- Bowdoin College
- Dartmouth College
- DeCordova Museum and Sculpture Park
- Fogg Art Museum at Harvard University
- Hawaii State Capitol, State of Hawaii
- Museum of Modern Art (MoMA)
- Museum of Fine Arts, Boston
- Muscarelle Museum of Art
- Munson-Williams-Proctor Arts Institute
- National Academy of Design, 1983, 84, 85, 87, 88, 90, 91, 92, 93, 94,
- Radcliffe College
- Muscarelle Museum of Art
- Wadsworth Athenaeum
- Walker Art Center

=== Commissions ===
- Twirling, bronze figure group, East Boston Housing for Elderly.
- The Spirit of Lili'uokalani, bronze, Hawaii State Capitol.

== Solo exhibitions ==
Slaughter Gallery, San Francisco, 1951, Walker Art Center, Minneapolis, 1952, Currier Gallery, Manchester, NH, 1954, De Cordova Museum, Lincoln, MA, 1954, Premier Gallery, Minneapolis, 1963, Swetzoff Gallery, Boston, 1953, 56, 64, Honolulu Academy Art, 1970, Alpha Gallery, Boston, 1972, Newton College, MA, 1972, Bumpus Gallery, Duxbury, MA, 1972, Contemporary Art Center, Honolulu, 1982, Hanalei Palace, Kona, HI 1982, Lyman House Museum, Hilo, HI, 1982, Pine Manor College, MA, 1984, Rotenberg Gallery, Boston, 1990, 93, 94, College of William and Mary, 1992, Wiggins Gallery, Boston Public Library, 1993.

== Awards and memberships ==
Pineda became a member of the Sculptors Guild, in 1952, and the National Sculpture Society in 1985. She was also a member of the National Academy of Design: In 1982 she was elected an Associate, and in 1990 she was elected an Academician.

She was awarded a gold medal by the National Academy of Design in 1987 and 1988. She was similarly awarded gold medals and prizes in 1986, 1988 and 1991 by the National Sculpture Society. The Art Institute of Chicago also awarded her a prize at the 62nd American Exhibition of Painting and Sculpture in 1957.

== Publications ==
- Faxon, Alicia and Sylvia Moore. Pilgrims and Pioneers: New England Women in the Arts. New York City, New York: Midmarch Arts Press, 1987. ISBN 978-0960247660
- Hills, Patricia. Marianna Pineda: Sculpture 1949 to 1969. Boston, MA: Alabaster Press, 1996. ISBN 0965431509
- Watson-Jones, VA. Contemporary American Women Sculptors. Oryx Press, 1986. ISBN 978-0897741392
- Rubenstein, Charlotte S. American Women Sculptors: A History of Women Working in Three Dimensions. Boston, MA: G.K. Hall, 1990. ISBN 978-0816187324
- Kitaj, Karma. Women Who Could...and Did: Lives of 26 Exemplary Artists and Scientists. Chestnut Hill, MA: Huckle Hill Press, 2002. (Print) ISBN 978-0971595729 / (Audiobook) 2015. ASIN: B00SXIUVD2
- Doherty, Maggie (2020). The Equivalents: A Story of Art, Female Friendship, and Liberation in the 1960s. Vintage. ISBN 9780525434603.
