= Always a New Beginning =

1974 film

- Directed by: John D. Goodell
- Produced by: John D. Goodell
- Narrated by: James Lawless
- Production company: Goodell Motion Pictures
- Distributed by: The Beginning Corporation
- Release date: March 1974
- Running time: 90 minutes
- Country: United States
- Language: English
- Budget: $400,000

Always a New Beginning is a 1974 American documentary film directed by John D. Goodell, about the founding and operation of The Institutes for the Achievement of Human Potential. It was nominated for an Academy Award for Best Documentary Feature.
