= Raymond Hendler =

American artist (1923–1998)

- Born: 1923; Philadelphia, Pennsylvania
- Died: 1998 (aged 74–75); East Hampton, New York
- Known for: Painter, educator
- Spouse: Mary Rood Hendler

Raymond Hendler (1923–1998) was an American artist known for his action painting.

== Biography ==
Hendler was born in 1923 in Philadelphia, Pennsylvania. He studied at the Philadelphia College of Art and went on to serve in the United States Army He also studied at the Pennsylvania Academy of the Fine Arts and the Tyler School of Art and Architecture. He traveled to Paris around in 1949 under the Servicemen's Readjustment Act of 1944 (the G.I. Bill). There he studied at the Academie de la Grand Chaumiere and was a founding member of the Galerie Huit.

He located in New York City in the early 1950s where he was a member of the New York Artists' Club. In the late 1960s Hendler moved to Minneapolis where he taught at the Minneapolis School of Art. For a time he served as head of the painting department. He retired in 1984. In 1963, Hendler received the Longview Foundation Purchase Award, juried by Willem de Kooning, Thomas B. Hess, Philip Guston, Harold Rosenberg, and David Smith.

Hendler died in 1998 in East Hampton, New York.

His work is in the collection of the Walker Art Center, and the Minneapolis Institute of Art.
