= Herbert Katzman =

American artist

- Born: January 8, 1923; Chicago, Illinois
- Died: October 15, 2004 (aged 81); New York, New York
- Known for: Painter
- Movement: Expressionism
- Website: herbert-katzman-museum.com

Herbert Katzman (1923–2004) was an American artist known for his Expressionist paintings.

== Biography ==
Katzman was born on January 8, 1923, in Chicago, Illinois. He attended the School of the Art Institute of Chicago before joining the United States Navy, serving during World War II. After the war he traveled to Paris where he was able to study Expressionist paintings. There he exhibited at the Galerie Huit.

Katzman settled in New York City in the 1950s. In 1952 his work was included in the MoMA exhibition Fifteen Americans. His work was included in the Whitney Museum annual exhibitions from 1951 through 1957. He was represented by the art dealer Terry Dintenfass. Katzman taught at the School of Visual Arts. In 1968 he received a Guggenheim Fellowship. In 2000 he received a Lee Krasner Award from the Pollock-Krasner Foundation.

Katzman died on October 15, 2004, in New York City.

In 2010 the Museum of the City of New York held a retrospective of his cityscapes entitled Glorious Sky: Herbert Katzman's New York.

His work is in the collection of the Dallas Museum of Art, the Smithsonian American Art Museum, the Whitney Museum of American Art, and the Yale University Art Gallery.
