= Oscar Chelimsky =

American abstract painter

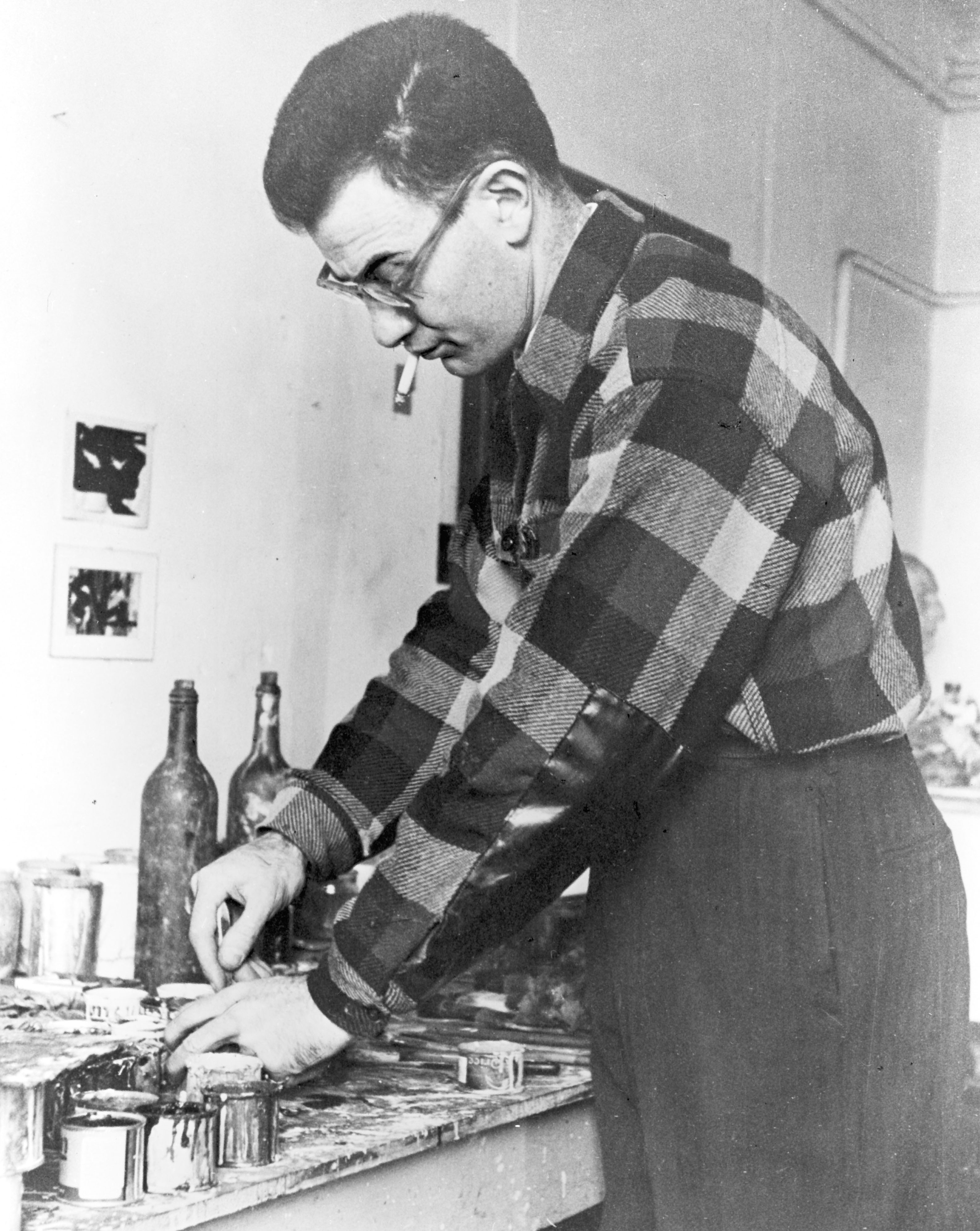
- Chelimsky in Paris, 1948
- Born: 5 January 1923; New York City
- Died: 9 January 2010 (aged 87); Shaker Heights, Ohio
- Education: Cooper Union; Art Students League of New York; Académie de la Grande Chaumière
- Occupations: Painter; painter
- Movement: Abstract expressionism; Lyrical abstraction

Oscar Chelimsky (January 5, 1923 - January 9, 2010) was an American painter of the lyrical abstractionist movement. He lived and exhibited in France from 1947 to 1970.

== Early life and education ==
Oscar Chelimsky was born in New York, where his father Max Chelimsky and his mother Bertha had established themselves after immigrating from Russia. He attended Cooper Union, the Art Students League of New York from 1939 to 1943, and the Hans Hoffmann School of Art in 1946 and 1947.

Chelimsky arrived in France in 1947, supported by a G.I. Bill grant. After a brief stay in Fontainebleau, he moved to Paris and enrolled in the Académie de la Grande Chaumière.

== Career ==
Between 1949 and 1950, Chelimsky moved into a vacant studio that he had discovered by chance on Impasse Ronsin, home to Constantin Brâncuși's social circle. However, he had to leave after a year when the studio was demolished.

In 1950, Chelimsky was one of the founding members of Galerie Huit, a co-operative gallery founded by young American artists to display their work. Chelimsky and his wife Eleanor Chelimsky spent their summers from 1954 to 1970 in Saint-Maurice-d'Ibie alongside the sculptor Étienne Hajdú and were visited there by their friends Stanley William Hayter and Helen Phillips (from nearby Alba-la-Romaine) and the poet Jacques Dupin.

Oscar and Eleanor Chelimsky returned to the United States in 1970 where he taught painting at the Maryland College of Art and Design until his retirement in 1991.

== Illness and death ==
Chelimsky was diagnosed with Parkinson's disease in 2005 and died in 2010 in Shaker Heights, Ohio.

== Exhibitions ==
- 1945: Chelimsky, Galerie Neuf, Manhattan, New York.
- 1953: Chelimsky, peintures, Marcel Fiorini, gravures sur bois, galerie Jeanne Bucher, Paris.
- 1955: 5 amerikanen in Europa (L. Alcopley, Oscar Chelimsky, Paul Fontaine, John H. Levee, B. Parker), Stedelijk museum, Amsterdam, January-February 1955 (catalogue).
- 1956: Peintures de Chelimsky, galerie Jeanne Bucher, Paris.
- 1956: Junge amerikanische kunst, Kunstmuseum, Düsseldorf (catalogue).
- 1958: Centre for Fine Arts, Brussels, January-February 1958 (catalogue, preface by Jacques Dupin).
- 1958: 4 artistes américains de Paris (Oscar Chelimsky, Harold B. Cousins, John Levee, Helen Phillips): Centre américain de Paris, Paris, April-May 1958 (catalogue).
- 1959: Peintures récentes de Chelimsky, galerie Jeanne Bucher, Paris.
- 1962: Chelimsky, The big open form, galerie Jeanne Bucher, October-November 1962 (catalogue, preface by Jérome Mellquist).
- 1963: 18ème Salon des Réalités Nouvelles, Musée d'Art Moderne, Paris (catalogue).
- 1965: Inform and Interpret, The American Federation of Arts, New York, October 1965.
- 1968: Chelimsky, The bright open form, galerie Jeanne Bucher, Paris.
- 1970: Chelimsky, Fine Arts Building, The Catholic University of America, Washington, October-November 1970.
- 1985: Chelimsky, The Salvin Gallery, Washington, 1985 (catalogue).
- 2012: Les américains à Paris, galerie Artemper, Paris, Octobre 2012.
- 2016: 5 G.I. à Paris, galerie Artemper, Paris, September-November 2016. (Note: alongside, notably, fr:Theodore Appleby, Don Fink, Sam Francis, Stanley William Hayter, John Franklin Koenig, John Levee, Jean-Paul Riopelle, Mark Tobey)

== Public collections ==
- Paris, Musée national d'art moderne, Paris
- Beauvais, Musée départemental de l'Oise: Big Open Form no. 78, Brown Arch, 1965, 130 x 160 cm; Big Open Form no. 85, through 1960, 130 x 1.62 cm; Big Open Form no. 86, through 1960, 114 x 1.45 cm
- New York, Solomon R. Guggenheim Museum

== Bibliography ==
- Stahly, François (1960). "Pariser Kunstchronik". Werk (in German). No. 5.
- Capdevilla, Elisa (April 2016). "Les Américains dans les cités d'artistes de Montparnasse (1945-1965) : une nouvelle bohème ? L'exemple des artistes américains à l'impasse Ronsin". Circé. Histoires, Cultures & Sociétés (in French) (8).
- Capdevilla, Elisa (2017). Des Américains à Paris, Artistes et bohèmes dans la France de l'après-guerre. Paris: Armand Colin. ISBN 978-2-200-61852-0.
- Chelimsky, Oscar; Rochette, Stéphane (2023). Oscar Chelimsky. De Paris à Saint-Maurice-d'Ibie followed by Quelques souvenirs sur Brancusi. Urau: Walkyrie Éditions. ISBN 978-2-9553979-7-8.

== Filmography ==
- d'Avino, Carmen. Vernissage of American Artists, Paris, 1950 (film). Transferred to video by Mathew White and RD White in 2002 (20 minutes).
