= Background (1973 film) =

1973 film

- Directed by: Carmen D'Avino
- Produced by: Carmen D'Avino
- Release date: 1973
- Running time: 19 minutes
- Country: United States
- Language: English

Background is a 1973 American self-portrait short documentary film directed by Carmen D'Avino. It was nominated for an Academy Award for Best Documentary Short. The film was preserved by the Academy Film Archive in 2012.

== See also ==
- List of American films of 1973
