= Paul F. Keene Jr. =

American artist and teacher (1920–2009)

Paul Farwell Keene Jr.
- photo of Keene at the Tyler School of Art in the 1940s. Photo by John W. Mosley
- Born: August 24, 1920; Philadelphia, Pennsylvania
- Died: November 26, 2009 (aged 89); Warrington, Pennsylvania
- Education: Philadelphia Museum School of Art, Tyler School of Art and Architecture, Académie Julian
- Known for: painter, printmaker, educator
- Spouse: Laura Mitchell

Paul Farwell Keene Jr. (24 August 1920 – 26 November 2009) was a Philadelphia-area artist and teacher whose work helped raise the visibility of Black American artists. As a self-described "abstract realist," his story reflects both the accomplishments and the difficulties of African American artists in the 20th century.

== Personal life ==
Keene was born on August 24, 1920, in Philadelphia, Pennsylvania. He was the son of Paul F. Keene Sr and Josephine Bond Hebron, co-founder of the National Association of Negro Business and Professional Women's Clubs, Incorporated. In 1944, he married Laura Mitchell, the great-great-granddaughter of abolitionist John Pierre Burr. They resided in Warrington, Pennsylvania with their son and daughter.

Keene earned three degrees (B.F.A., B.Sc.Ed., and M.F.A.), and was also a member of the Omega Psi Phi fraternity.

== Biography ==
During World War II, Keene served with the Tuskegee Airmen in the 332nd Fighter Group and attained the rank of lieutenant. Keene attended the Philadelphia Museum School of Art, the Tyler School of Art and Architecture, and the Académie Julian. He studied at the Academie Julian in Paris under the G.I. Bill. While in Paris, Keene was a founding member of Galerie Huit, a collective gallery for American artists. Keene exhibited with Picasso and Leger at the Salon de Mai and through Whitney Fellowships directed courses at the Centre D'Art, Port-au-Prince, Haiti between 1952 and 1954.

In 1952 Keene located to Haiti where he studied and taught under a John Hay Whitney fellowship. In 1954 he returned to the United States. He taught at Temple University’s Tyler School of Art, as well as the Philadelphia College of Art, where he taught until 1968. From 1968 through 1985 Keene taught at the Bucks County Community College, where he helped to establish a new art department.

In 1966 Keene painted a mural at the HBCU Johnson C. Smith University in Charlotte, North Carolina. In 1971 Keene created a relief installation for the Fifty Ninth Street Baptist Church in Philadelphia. He had a two-decade-long association with the Brandywine Workshop and was the recipient of their Van Der Zee Award in 1990.

Keene died on November 26, 2009, in Warrington, Pennsylvania.

His works are in collections at the Philadelphia Museum of Art, the Pennsylvania Academy of the Fine Arts, the African American Museum in Philadelphia, the Hampton University Museum in Virginia, the James A. Michener Art Museum., the British Museum in London, the James E. Lewis Museum of Art at Morgan State University in Baltimore, the Nigerian National Museum, the Pennsylvania State Museum in Harrisburg, the Dallas Museum of Art, and the Tucson Museum of Art, among others.

Keene's work was also included in the 2015 exhibition We Speak: Black Artists in Philadelphia, 1920s-1970s at the Woodmere Art Museum.

Paul F. Keene Jr, The Cliff Dwellers, 1950, Michael Rosenfeld Gallery, N.Y
