= The Directors Company =

American film production company

The Directors Company was a short-lived film production company formed by Francis Ford Coppola, Peter Bogdanovich, and William Friedkin in the early 1970s in association with Paramount Pictures. The directors were allowed to make any film they wished provided they kept within a certain budget.

== History ==
According to Friedkin, the idea for the Directors Company came from Charles Bludhorn, chairman of the Gulf and Western Corporation, which owned Paramount. Friedkin, Coppola and Bogdanovich were all coming off hit films and Bludhorn wanted to work with them. Friedkin says Bludhorn made the deal with the directors without informing Paramount's Frank Yablans, who was strongly opposed to the idea of the company.

Nonetheless in 1972 Yablans announced the Directors Company would make three films, each under $3 million – Paper Moon (Bogdanovich), The Conversation (Coppola) and The Bunker Hill Boys (Friedkin); he also said the company aimed to make 12 pictures in all and would possibly move into television. A board of directors consisting of three Paramount executives and three company directors would pass judgement on the films. Bogdanovich:

I thought it was a great idea... The money we could make was limited to a certain amount, which I thought was perfectly good, but Friedkin felt he wanted more money, and more money for the budget. Our deal was, we could make any picture we wanted, as long as it was three million or under, which was a lot of money in those days. We could also produce a movie for someone else if it wasn’t more than $1.5 million. We didn’t even have to show them a script! It was a great deal, and I wish I could get one like it again. That kind of freedom is worth gold, I think. It was a shame.

Peter Bart, a vice-president of Paramount at the time, was given the job of supervising the Directors Company. Each filmmaker was allowed to have a protege who could make a film for the company; Bogdanovich chose Orson Welles, who suggested the younger director make Daisy Miller. Bogdanovich later said that he wanted to help King Vidor make a movie about James Murray, star of The Crowd. According to William Friedkin, the company had the opportunity to make Star Wars when Coppola brought them the script, but neither Friedkin or Bogdanovich were enthusiastic about it, so they passed.

The Directors Company got off to a strong start with the release of Paper Moon, which was a critical and commercial success. It was followed by The Conversation, which was a major critical success. It performed moderately well at the box office, but was not as financially successful as Paper Moon. Daisy Miller flopped at the box office and Friedkin did not end up making any movies for the company.

Friedkin later said he was proud to be associated with Paper Moon but did not like The Conversation, thinking it was a rip-off of Blow Up. He also says he was strongly opposed to Bogdanovich making Daisy Miller, thinking it was not commercial enough, and felt Yablans encouraged the director to make it in part to end the company.

The financial failure of Daisy Miller and internal fighting over The Conversation ended the Directors Company. Friedkin says another reason was because of tensions created because of the adversarial position he took against Bogdanovich over Daisy Miller. Bart later wrote in 2004 that:

The chief problem with the Directors' Company... was that it was never really a company. The three filmmakers involved in its founding... relished the basic precepts of the enterprise, but, as true '70s mavericks, resisted serious involvement in its operation... Which was a shame because, had the company survived, these three (and other) filmmakers had much to gain from it. All three of the founding filmmakers went on to display rather arcane choices in material for their next films. All could have benefited from a collegial give and take with their peers. Further, the basic structure of the company was valid -- perhaps ahead of its time. It made sense for a studio to assign a portion of its filmmaking program to directors who would function with a high degree of autonomy. It also made sense to extend them a substantial piece of the gross receipts in return for a commitment to tight budgets. Indeed, several efforts to emulate this business plan have been advanced (most recently with a group that included Steven Soderbergh). Nothing, however, has ever taken shape.

== Filmography ==
- Paper Moon (1973)
- The Conversation (1974)
- Daisy Miller (1974)
