= Haywood Rivers =

American artist (1922–2001)

- Born: May 8, 1922; Morven, North Carolina, U.S.
- Died: December 27, 2001 (aged 79)
- Other name: Bill Rivers
- Education: Art Students League of New York, Ecole du Louvre

Haywood "Bill" Rivers (May 8, 1922 – December 27, 2001) was an African American contemporary artist and gallerist.

== Biography ==
Haywood Rivers was born in Morven, North Carolina on May 8, 1922. He attended classes the Art Students League of New York, from 1946 to 1949; and then continued his training at the Ecole du Louvre in Paris, from 1949 to 1952.

With funding from the Rosenwald Fund in 1948, Rivers opened Galerie Huit, an exhibition space for American artists in Paris, which he managed along with his partners Al Held and Jules Olitski, for five years. Some of the gallery's exhibitors included Edward Clark (artist), Herbert Gentry, and Paul Keene. Rivers' early works demonstrate his familiarity with French modernists and their tendencies toward figural simplification, planarity, and non-illusionism; however, when he returned to the United States, he adopted a non-objectivist approach to painting and was strongly influenced by the styles of African American artists, Jacob Lawrence and Horace Pippin. Certain elements remained steadfast in Rivers' work, such as his heavy and vigorous application of pigment onto the canvas, formidable displays of color, and themes from his youth in North Carolina

Rivers was featured in several solo exhibitions at various art venues including the Baltimore Museum of Art in 1948, the Artist House in New York in 1973, and the Anne Weber Gallery in Georgetown, Maine in 1983. His work also was shown in many group exhibitions, among them: "Contemporary American Black Artists at the Hudson River Museum in Yonkers, New York; Afro-American Artists" New York and Boston" at the Boston Museum of Fine Arts; "Black Artists: Two Generations" at the Newark Museum, "Black Artist/South" at the Huntsville Museum of Art in Huntsville, Alabama, "Artists Invite Artists" at The New Museum in New York, New York.

Rivers received awards and honors to recognize his talent: Gretchen H. Hutzler Award, 1948, Baltimore Museum Annual Prize, 1948; Julius Rosenwald Fellowship, 194; and John Hay Whitney Fellowship, 1952. His paintings were part of two major public collections as well, the Baltimore Museum of Art and the Centre Pompidou.
