= Harold Tovish =

American sculptor

- Born: July 31, 1921; New York City, New York
- Died: January 4, 2008 (aged 86); Albuquerque, New Mexico
- Known for: Sculpture

Harold Tovish (July 31, 1921 – January 4, 2008) was an American sculptor who worked in bronze, wood, and synthetic media. He was famous for exacting standards, and even refused to complete many of the sculptures he began. Tovish focused on the human form as the primary vehicle for exploring metaphysical existence.

== Life ==
Tovish was born in New York City to a Russian refugee father. His father died during the Great Depression and his destitute mother placed his older sisters in foster care and sent young Tovish to the Hebrew Orphan Asylum of New York. He took drawing classes that were sponsored by the Works Progress Administration (WPA). Around age 16, Tovish finished his first sculpture, which then set the direction of his career. He received a scholarship and studied at the Columbia University School of the Arts where he studied with Oronzio Maldarelli. At Columbia, he also met Marianna Pineda. He earned his degree in 1943.

Tovish was in Minneapolis-St Paul for a number of years around 1950, probably with the University of MN art department. (He and Marianna were family friends.)

Tovish was sent to Europe by the United States Army during World War II. Upon returning in 1946, he married Pineda. He traveled to Paris with Ossip Zadkine, as well as Florence to study sculpture and drawing. After living in Europe for three years, the couple established residence and a studio in Boston in 1957.

Tovish was artist-in-residence at the American Academy in Rome in 1965. In 1967, he received a Guggenheim Fellowship. Tovish taught at the School of the Museum of Fine Arts, was a fellow at the Center for Advanced Visual Studies at the Massachusetts Institute of Technology. Tovish was College of Fine Arts professor at Boston University from 1971 until his retirement in 1983.

After his wife died in 1996, Tovish completed no works. He died of complications of a stroke one year after moving out of Boston to a retirement home in Albuquerque, New Mexico.

== Works ==
The early work of Tovish focused on the horror he witnessed as a soldier during World War II. In the early 1950s, he became concerned with the destructive consequences of science and technology, portraying humankind confronted with the machinery of "progress".

Hilton Kramer described Tovish's 28 sculptures and 20 drawings that were exhibited at the Solomon R. Guggenheim Museum as "tedious, banal, and egregiously secondhand ... the work of a provincial artist – no doublt adept in technique, but woefully deficient in ideas or imagination."

According to his daughter, Nina, Tovish "held himself to an extremely high standard and was ruthless about it" and as a consequence "he didn't leave behind a great body of work. He threw out 99 percent of everything he made." He also requested that family members destroy all of his unfinished works upon his death.

A retrospective display of six bronze sculptures organized by the DeCordova Museum and Sculpture Park of the artist's face and head showed a range of styles, including cubism and surrealism, as well as what was described as "contemporary biomorphic abstraction".

=== Collections ===
- The Museum of Modern Art
- The Art Institute of Chicago
- Walker Art Center
