= Jonah Kinigstein =

American artist (1923–2025)

- Born: June 26, 1923; New York City, U.S.
- Died: December 6, 2025 (aged 102)
- Education: Cooper Union
- Known for: Painter, cartoonist
- Movement: Expressionism
- Spouse: Eileen Muken
- Children: 2

Jonah Kinigstein (June 26, 1923 – December 6, 2025) was an American artist known for his Expressionist paintings.

== Early life and education ==
Kinigstein was born in Brooklyn, New York City, on June 26, 1923. His parents were Jewish immigrants from Russia and Poland. As a teenager, he would use chalk to make sidewalk art. At times he worked with his father, a house painter.

After high school, he attended Cooper Union. Before he graduated, he was drafted into the army during World War II, where he served in a photo topography unit.

== Art career ==
After being discharged from the army, he moved to Paris, where he attended the Académie de la Grande Chaumière, and Accademia di Belle Arti di Roma. He exhibited at the Galerie Huit.

He later moved back to Manhattan. The rise of abstract expressionism and the loss in popularity in figurative art prevented Kinigstein from being able to paint for a living. He worked in commercial art, where he designed Bloomingdale's first collectible shopping bag in 1961. He also began drawing political cartoons criticizing abstract expressionism and the figures in the art world promoting it.

Kinigstein continued to paint for himself. He dubbed his style "figurative expressionism", and his painting frequently depict distorted figures in front of surreal backgrounds. At age 99, he continued to paint for two or three hours a day in his home.

Kinigstein's work is in the collection of the Museum of Modern Art, the Smithsonian American Art Museum, and the Whitney Museum of American Art.

== Personal life and death ==
Kinigstein was married twice and had two children. His second wife is Eileen Muken. He turned 100 in June 2023, and died on December 6, 2025, at the age of 102.

== Awards ==
Kinigstein was the recipient of a Fulbright Fellowship as well as a Louis Comfort Tiffany Foundation award.

== Publications ==
In 2014, a book of his cartoons entitled The Emperor's New Clothes: The Tower of Babel in the "Art" World was published by Fantagraphics Underground.

In 2022, Unrepentant Artist: The Paintings of Jonah Kinigstein was published.
