= Bill Malley =

American production designer (1934–2023)

- Born: September 23, 1931
- Other name: William O'Keefe Malley
- Occupations: Production designer Art director
- Years active: 1971–1998

Bill Malley (born September 23, 1931) is an American production designer and art director. He was nominated for an Academy Award in the category Best Art Direction for the film The Exorcist.

== Selected filmography ==
- The Exorcist (1973)
- The Fury (1978)
- The Ninth Configuration (1980)
- Mommie Dearest (1981)
- The Star Chamber (1983)
- Vision Quest (1985)
- Dr. Giggles (1992)
