= Addie Pray =

1971 novel by Joe David Brown

- Author: Joe David Brown
- Language: English
- Genre: Fiction
- Publisher: Simon & Schuster
- Publication date: June 1, 1971
- Publication place: United States
- Media type: Print (hardcover)
- Pages: 313 pp
- ISBN: 978-0671209629

Addie Pray is a 1971 novel by Joe David Brown. It was adapted for the 1973 film Paper Moon, directed by Peter Bogdanovich. After the film's release, the novel was retitled Paper Moon.

The 1974 ABC situation comedy Paper Moon, which aired from September 1974 to January 1975, was based on the 1973 movie and the characters created for Addie Pray.

== Synopsis ==
The novel is narrated by Addie, an orphaned girl, who travels with confidence man Moses "Long Boy" Pray in the early 1930s, during the Great Depression. Addie states at the beginning of the novel that Long Boy may or may not be her father; she says that her late mother was the "wildest" girl in her town, and that Long Boy is one of her three possible fathers. Their characters are established in Alabama, and the storyline then carries them to other Southern states around Memphis.

In the second part of the novel, Addie and Moses meet an older conman who teaches them class and sophistication. They then begin dropping fake letters, promising big yields in a silver mine, in order to draw in greedy victims.

In the last third of the novel, Addie is more directly involved in a scam, posing as the long-lost granddaughter of a supposedly wealthy old woman.

== Editions ==
- Addie Pray, Simon & Schuster, 1971. ISBN 978-0-671-20962-9
- Paper Moon: A Novel, Thunder's Mouth Press, 2002. ISBN 978-1-56858-230-6
