= Carmen D'Avino =

American animator

Carmen D’Avino
- Born: 31 October 1918; Woodbury, Connecticut, United States
- Died: 30 November 2004 (aged 86); Ogdensburg, New York, United States
- Known for: Animation, Painting, Sculpture.
- Spouse(s): Elsie Forte and Helena Elfving Children: Anthony Carmen D'Avino (1943)

Carmen D'Avino (October 31, 1918 – November 30, 2004) was an artist and early creator of animated short films. His films received two Academy Award nominations and were regularly screened at the Cinema 16 film society.

== Biography ==
=== Early years ===
D'Avino stated that as a teenager in Connecticut, he traded his vintage hunting rifle for a Kodak movie camera and began experimenting.

Beginning in the late 1930s with his studies at the Art Students League in New York City, and influenced by his teachers Robert Brackman and Andre l'Hote, D'Avino gravitated toward films and painting. His work with film led to his World War II assignment as a combat photographer with the Fourth Infantry Division of the US Army that climaxed with his filming the Normandy Invasion and the Liberation of Paris.

D'Avino remained in Paris after the war and was the first American to use the GI Bill to study abroad. He enrolled at the École nationale supérieure des Beaux-Arts in Paris.

While studying oil painting, D'Avino was stimulated by film shorts, especially Alain Resnais's 1948 film Van Gogh, which he saw in cine-clubs in Paris. He began to experiment with film, documenting the experiences of postwar France.

D'Avino met his future wife, Helena Elfving of Finland in 1947, and in 1948, after an extended tour hitchhiking together across Italy, he followed her to India where she had accepted the position of tutor to the son of the newly posted French Ambassador to India.

D'Avino had hoped to continue his art studies in India under the GI Bill, but was unable to find a suitable school. His time in India proved to be extremely educational, nonetheless. Henri Cartier-Bresson became one of his companions, and their conversations about photography were both enlivened and enlightening. D'Avino also had the opportunity to meet and discuss film with Jean Renoir who was in Delhi to film The River. Their conversations centered on the future possibilities of short films.

He continued his painting and exhibited twice, once in Delhi and once in Bombay. The contrast of strong colors found in D'Avino's work comes out of his time spent in India. He was influenced by Indian miniature paintings, most of all from their ornamental elements and areas covered in pure colors. The same style is apparent in his film animations of the 1960s and 1970s. The contrast of colors remains always lively in his films, where red, orange and yellow details are presented together as a contrast with the cold colors, green and blue. After a stay in India of 18 months, D'Avino returned to Paris.

In the spring of 1950, the sculptor Robert Rosenwald left his small studio at number 8, rue St. Julian le Pauvre, located directly across the street from one of the oldest churches in Paris, and diagonally across the Seine from the towers of Notre Dame, and turned it over to his friend Haywood "Bill" Rivers. Rivers in turn invited a number of his artist friends to join him in turning the studio into a gallery, the only gallery in Paris run by Americans essentially to show the work of U.S. painters, though some others were also shown. The opening of the gallery created considerable excitement and was reported both in the English language press as well as in a number of French papers. Even Pablo Picasso is said to have stopped by to see what was going on. In its slightly more than two years of existence more than 50 painters and sculptors exhibited at Galerie Huit, including Carmen D'Avino, Shinkichi Tajiri, Harold Tovish, Oscar Chelimsky, Sydney Geist, Al Held, Burt Hasan, George Earl Ortman, Raymond Hendler, Robert Rosenwald.

D'Avino continued his art studies by enrolling at the Academie de la Grand Chaumiere, and in 1951 returned to North America, and eventually to New York City. He bought himself a 16 mm Pathe camera and made a short film called Sunday Afternoon, which won first prize in a competition sponsored by the Creative Film Foundation. The honor of receiving a Creative Film Award was significantly enhanced when Salvador Dalí presented it to D'Avino, who was now embarking on a career in film that would last the rest of his life.

=== Mid-career ===
D'Avino's film making flourished during the personally, politically, and artistically liberating years of the 1960s. His films were shown and awarded honors at film festivals in New York, San Francisco, Montevideo, Uruguay; London, England; Oberhausen, Germany; Annecy, France; Mamaia, Rumania; Kraków, Poland; Edinburgh, Scotland; and Melbourne, Australia. In 1963 his short film Stone Sonata was awarded the Special Jury Award at Annecy International Animation Festival in France.

His 1963 animated short film Pianissimo was selected to open the first night of performances at the first international film festival of New York's newly constructed Lincoln Center in 1963. Pianissimo was nominated for an Academy Award for Best Animated Short Subject, in 1964. Also in 1964 D'avino received the Ford Foundation Grant for $10,000. D'Avino received an Academy nomination for Best Documentary Short for his film Background in 1974. In 1983, when Lincoln Center's film festival celebrated its 20th anniversary, D'Avino was honored once more when the festival again began with his film, Pianissimo.

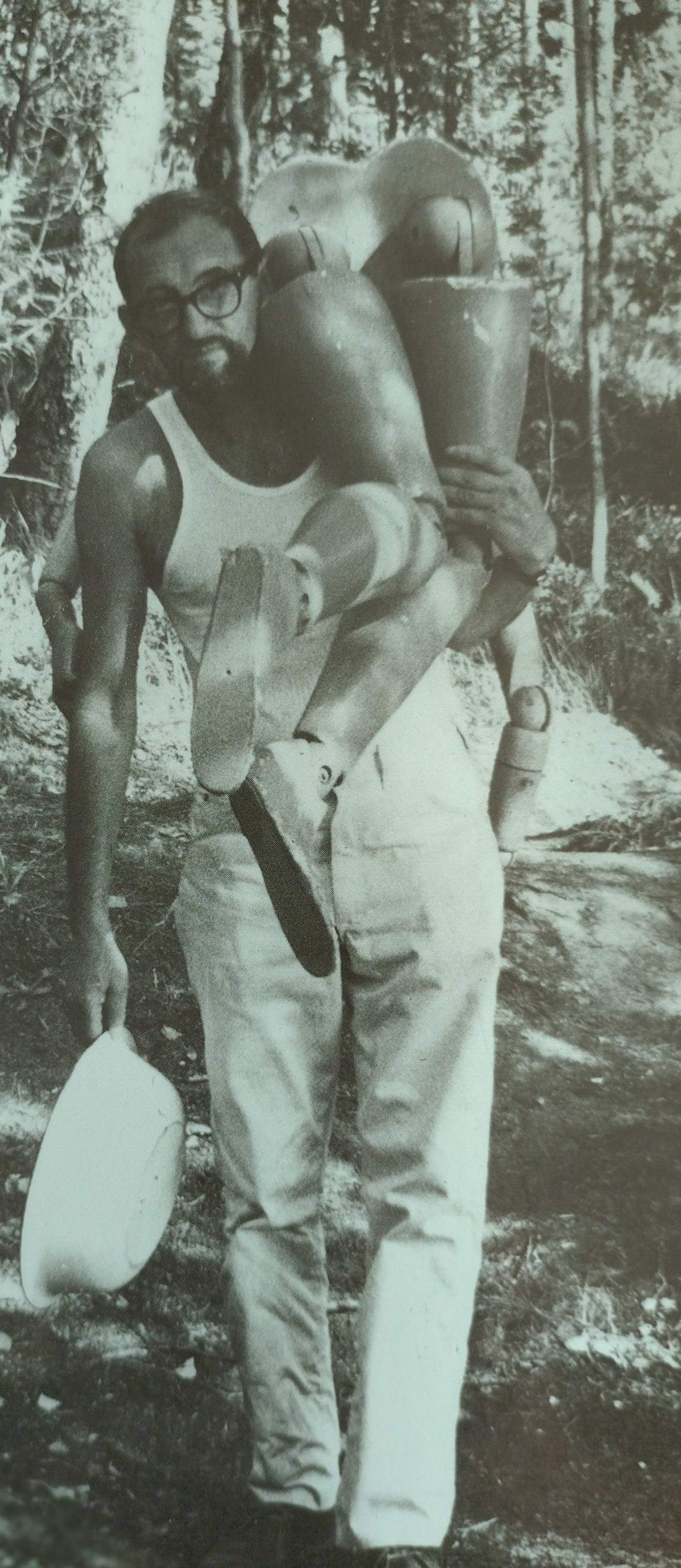
Carmen D'Avino carrying a mannequin during the making of A Finnish Fable (1965).

Avino's 1965 film A Finnish Fable mixes pixilated live-action with stop-motion and object animation. The film was shot outdoors and starred a mannequin. In 2011 Finnish experimental film maker Niina Suominen honored the legacy of Carmen D'Avino with her film A Finnish Fable 2011. The film was also shot outdoors and featured a male mannequin.

D'Avino's body of work includes films for corporations including IBM, Time-Life, and the New York Stock Exchange. He completed a series of short, fully animated films for the Children's Television Workshop including Happy, Freak , Funny, Library, Flower, and Hydrant alongside the trailer for the 1974 French film Going Places.

=== Later years ===
As he grew older, D'Avino challenged himself by working in new and, to him, yet untried materials. The sculptures in wood gave way to carvings of stone blocks weighing many tons. Marble led to limestone and then to granite.

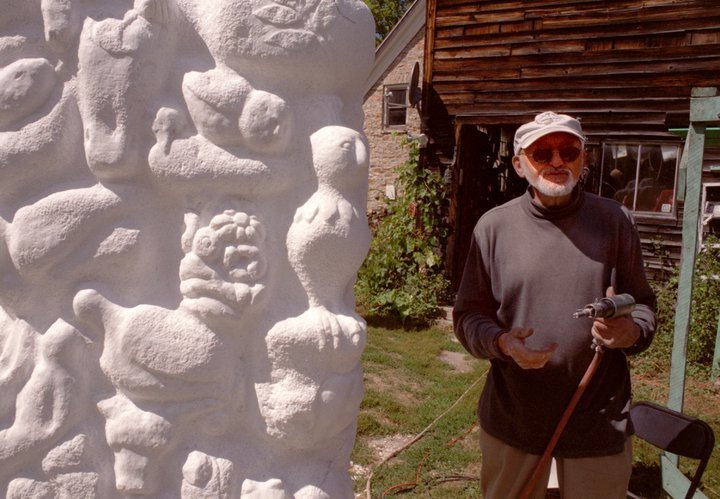
D'Avino standing next to his sculpture, "St. Francis", in Hammond, New York.

When in his 80s he began to produce films on his newly acquired Apple computer and he marveled at the relative ease and affordability that today's film makers enjoyed: "When I think of all the images I didn't record because I couldn't afford the film, and see how cheaply it can be accomplished today, I am amazed and somewhat saddened that it came too late for me. I know, though, that some young person will use this new medium in a unique and exciting way."

D'Avino creates whimsy through his use of materials, including the grain of the wood and vivid colors, which result in intricate designs and rich textures.

D'Avino’s work involves a physical process of creating sculptures, which includes chopping, cutting, carving, filing, and sanding wood. This manual labor is central to his production of sculptures, paintings, and films. He describes the act of creating as the primary element of his work, viewing the creative process as a sustaining practice.

D'Avino believed all you need is food, work and love. "To keep busy is a marvelous answer to some dull existence. Life is a great adventure no matter what you do. Life is a joy".

D'Avinos wife Helena D'Avino wrote a book Carmen - kohtaloni (Carmen - My Destiny) about their life together. The book was published by Siirtolaisuusinstituutti (The Institute of Migration) in Finnish in Turku in 1998.

Several of D'Avino's films have been preserved by the Academy Film Archive, including Pianissimo (1963), The Room (1959), and A Trip (1960), in 2007, and Background (1973), in 2012.

== Interviews ==
Conversations with the Artist, 1997–2004 Karen Nadder Lago
