= Oronzio Maldarelli =

American sculptor (1892–1963)

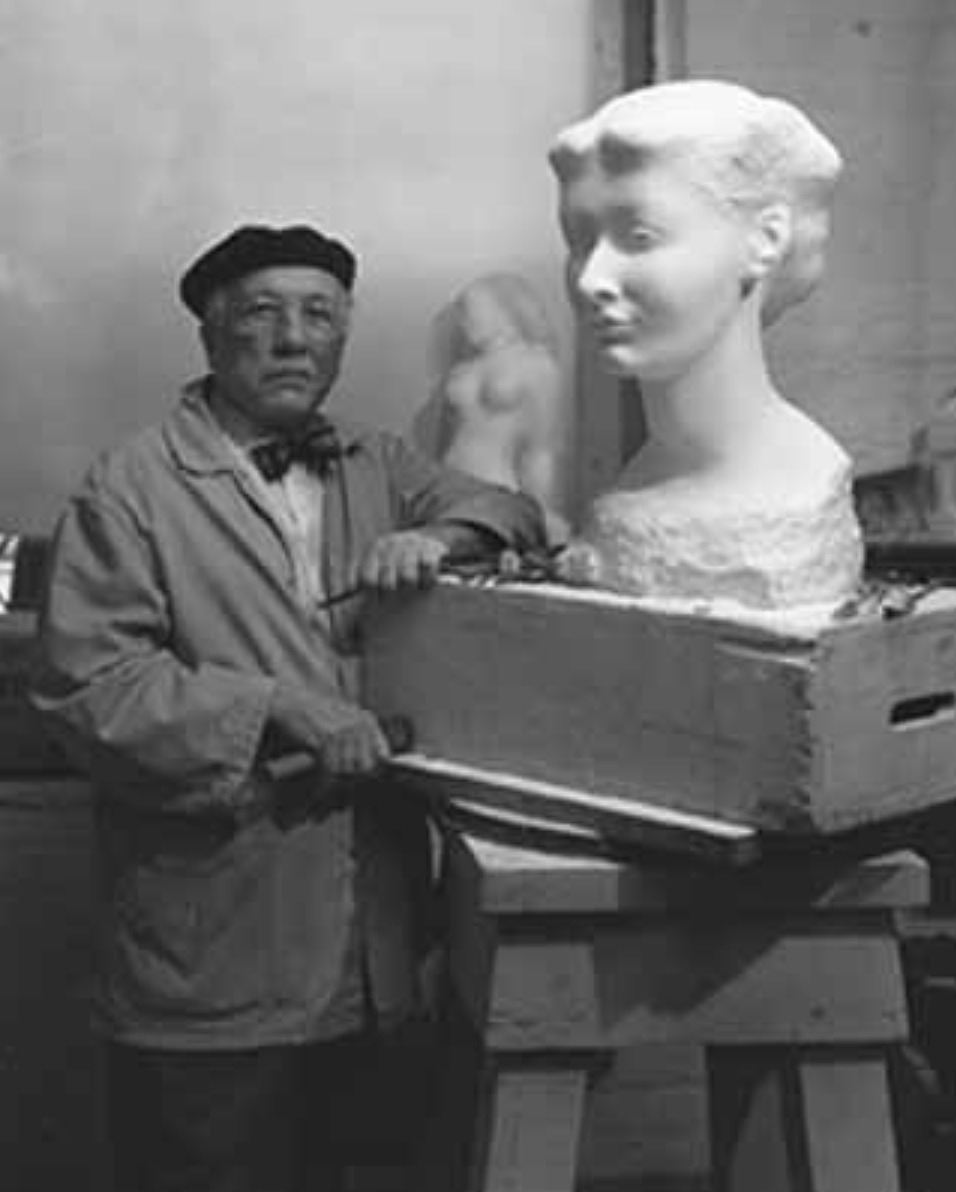
- Born: September 9, 1892; Naples, Italy
- Died: January 4, 1963 (aged 70); New York City, U.S.
- Other name: Oronzie Maldarelli
- Education: National Academy of Design, Beaux-Arts Institute of Design
- Occupations: Sculptor, painter, educator
- Spouse: Matilda Schreiber (m. 1925–)

Oronzio Maldarelli (1892 – 1963) was an Italian-born American sculptor, painter, and educator. He taught at Sarah Lawrence College and Columbia University. Like many other sculptors of his day, Maldarelli produced both architectural and funerary sculpture.

== Education ==
Oronzio Maldarelli was born on September 9, 1892, in Naples, Italy. He immigrated in 1901 to the United States with his parents, Michael Maldarelli, a goldsmith, and mother, Louisa Rizzo Maldarelli. In 1925, he married Matilda Schreiber in Yonkers, New York.

His early career was studying jewelry design. About 1906, he began taking modeling lessons at the Cooper Union. He later study at the National Academy of Design, with Leon Kroll, Ivan Olinsky, and Hermon Atkins MacNeil. In 1912, he entered the Beaux-Arts Institute of Design, where he studied under Jo Davidson, Elie Nadelman, and John Gregory.

== Career ==
Maldarelli's classical training allowed him to obtain commissions for both garden decorations and architectural sculpture. However as he grew older his work became more and more abstracted, though it would remain basically figurative. In 1929, he had a solo exhibition of his pastel works at Grand Central Art Galleries in New York City.

He taught at both Sarah Lawrence College and Columbia University. One known student, Mario Cooper, would go on to considerable fame as an illustrator and also would teach at Columbia.

While working at Columbia University in early 1950, Maldarelli met and taught a young Canadian police officer named John Reginald Abbott, a member of the Royal Canadian Mounted Police. Abbott had received authorization and funding to study sculpture in New York City in order to develop a new system of criminal identification for the Royal Canadian Mounted Police that relied on sculpted composites of suspected criminals.

He was a member of the National Sculpture Society, the Architectural League of New York, and the National Academy of Design. He was awarded the Widener Gold Medal from the Pennsylvania Academy of Fine Arts.

Maldarelli died at the age of 70 on January 4, 1963, in New York City from a heart attack.

== Collections ==
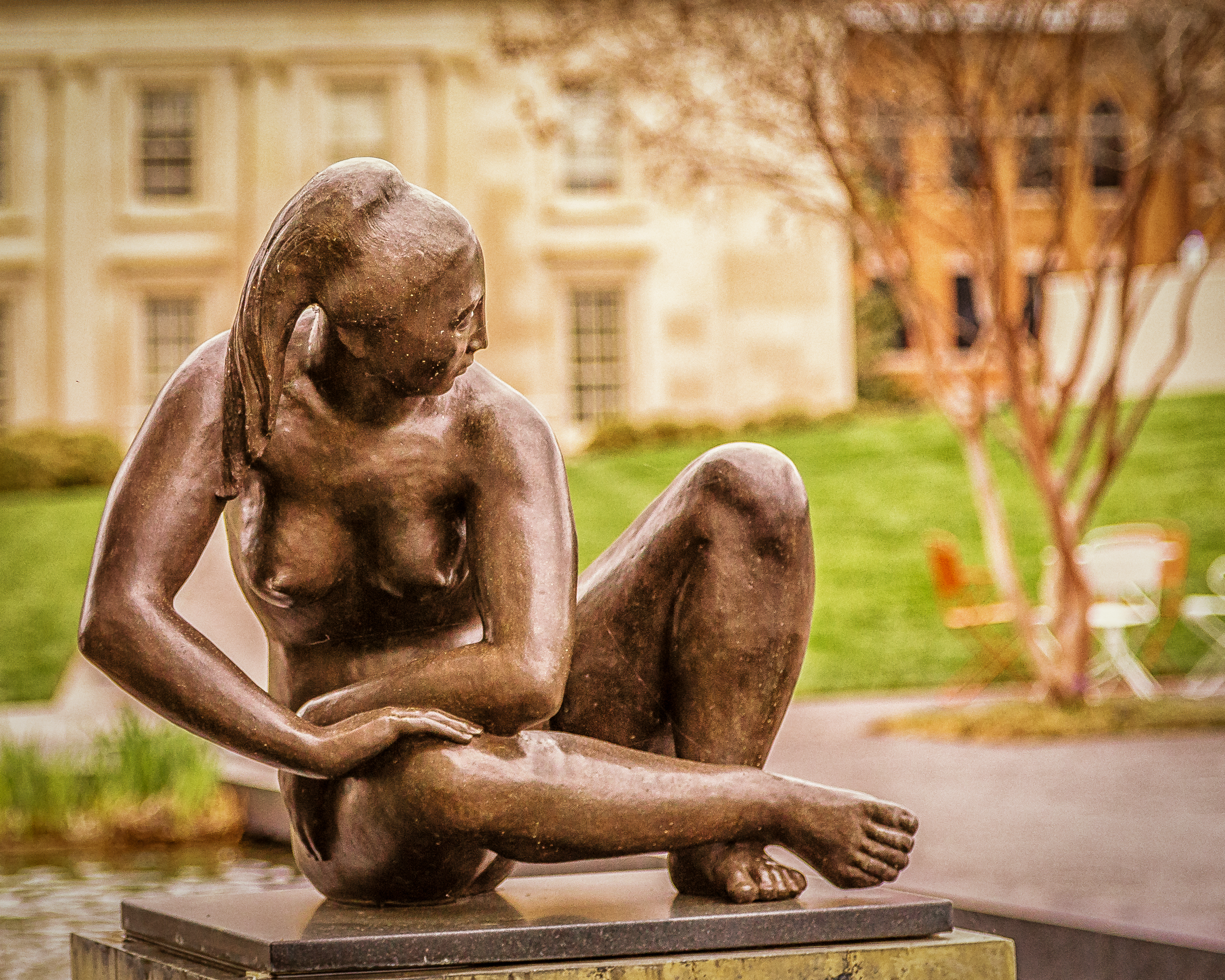
Bianca No. 2, 1951, by Oronzio Maldarelli, displayed at the Virginia Museum of Fine Arts, Richmond, Virginia.

- St Louis Art Museum, St Louis, Missouri
- Fogg Art Museum, Harvard University, Cambridge, Massachusetts
- Smithsonian American Art Museum, Washington, D.C.
- Smithsonian Institution's Hirshhorn Museum and Sculpture Garden, Washington, D.C.
- Whitney Museum of American Art, New York City
- Pennsylvania Academy of Fine Arts, Philadelphia, Pennsylvania
- Virginia Museum of Fine Arts, Richmond, Virginia
- Metropolitan Museum of Art, New York City
- Art Institute of Chicago, Chicago, Illinois
- Newark Museum, Newark, New Jersey
- St. Patrick's Cathedral, New York City
