= Ryan and Tatum: The O'Neals =

2011 American TV series

- Ryan and Tatum O'Neal
- Genre: Reality; Docudrama; Miniseries
- Starring: Ryan O'Neal; Tatum O'Neal; Redmond O'Neal
- Country of origin: United States
- Original language: English
- No. of seasons: 1
- No. of episodes: 8

Production
- Executive producers: Ryan O'Neal; Tatum O'Neal; R. Greg Johnston
- Production locations: Los Angeles, California, Washington, D.C.

Original release
- Network: OWN: Oprah Winfrey Network
- Release: June 19 – August 14, 2011

Ryan and Tatum: The O'Neals is an American reality television show aired between June and August 2011 on the OWN: Oprah Winfrey Network. The series focused on actors Ryan and Tatum O'Neal and a reconciliation process the two began in an effort to redevelop their father/daughter relationship after twenty-five years.

== Synopsis ==
Described by OWN as a "docu-series", the eight-episode series began with Tatum moving back to Los Angeles after twenty-five years of living in New York City with the desire to reconcile her estranged relationship with her father, Ryan. Ryan, who has lived in the same home for forty years, is trying to rebuild his life after the death of his longtime partner Farrah Fawcett.

The show also includes Fawcett and Ryan's son, Redmond O'Neal, who lives with his father. Ryan's other sons, Patrick and Griffin O'Neal, are not featured in the show because of an estranged relationship with their father prior to and during filming, although Griffin is heard speaking to Tatum on the telephone in the first episode. Additionally, there is very little mention of Tatum's ex-husband, John McEnroe; however, one of their three children, Sean, lives in Los Angeles and has a relationship with Ryan. John McEnroe stated on The Wendy Williams Show that he hoped his adult children do not participate in the series. He stated, “two of them won’t and I think that none of them agreed to be on it.” McEnroe felt, “I think this (the show) is an accident waiting to happen”.

To coincide with the series, Tatum also released a memoir, Found: A Daughter's Journey Home. The memoir chronicles her family, her childhood, her struggles with substance abuse, and her reconciliation with her father.

In September 2011, it was reported that the reconciliation did not take and it was only for show and not in life. Ryan blamed Oprah Winfrey for further distancing him from Tatum, alluding to Oprah's lack of support by stating, "we're further apart now than we were when we started the show. So thanks, Oprah, for all your help." Representatives of Ryan stated the quotes were taken out of context and he and Tatum were still working on strengthening their relationship. However, Ryan told Access Hollywood that he did not foresee a second season, adding, "did I open up? I tried. Does Tatum like me any better? No. So what's the point?"

== Episodes ==
No.	Title	Original release date
1	"A Home Coming"	June 19, 2011
For the series premiere, Tatum moves from New York City to Los Angeles.
2	"He Said, She Said"	June 26, 2011
Tatum talks Ryan into seeing a therapist to deal with his anger issues. Meanwhile, Tatum sees a therapist too.
3	"It's Only a Paper Moon"	July 10, 2011
Ryan and Tatum attend a screening of their film Paper Moon.
4	"Sobering News"	July 17, 2011
Ryan's therapist suggests joint sessions with Tatum to better understand her struggles with sobriety.
5	"For the Love of Farrah"	July 24, 2011
Ryan and Tatum participate in ceremonies honoring Farrah Fawcett.
6	"At a Crossroad"	July 31, 2011
After the ceremonies for Farrah, Ryan and Tatum do not speak.
7	"A Page Turner"	August 7, 2011
The two participate in emotional therapy sessions and Ryan gives his thoughts about Tatum's book.
8	"To Begin Again"	August 14, 2011
In the season finale, Ryan and Tatum are at an impasse.

== Production ==
The show was produced by the OWN network, and aired on Sundays at 10/9c. Eight episodes were produced to begin season one and the series was not renewed.
