= Tatum O'Neal =

American actress (born 1963)

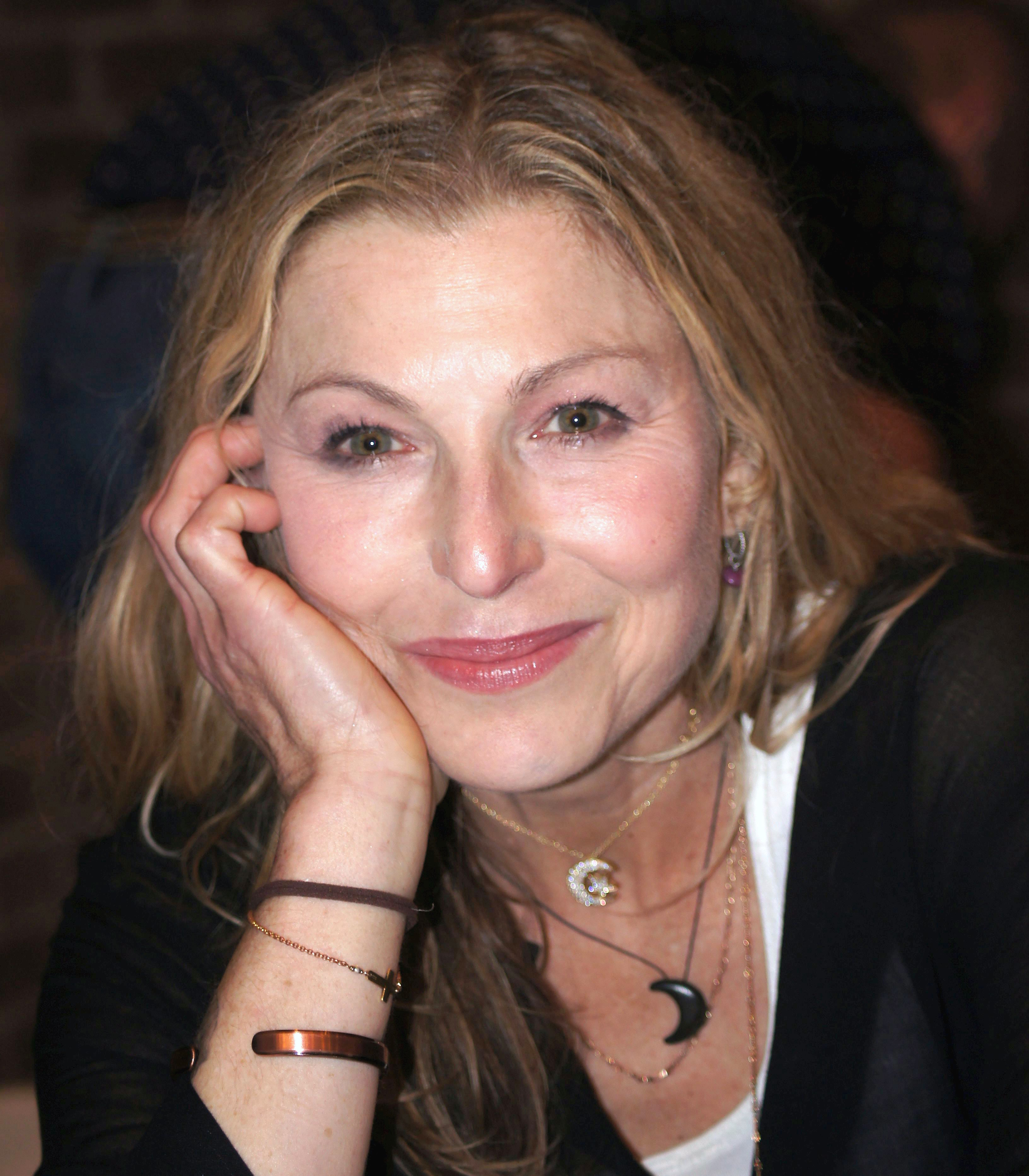
- O'Neal in 2019
- Born: Tatum Beatrice O'Neal; November 5, 1963 (age 62); Los Angeles, California, U.S.
- Occupation: Actress
- Years active: 1973–present
- Spouse: John McEnroe (m. 1986; div. 1994)
- Children: 3
- Parent(s): Ryan O'Neal; Joanna Moore
- Relatives: Griffin O'Neal (brother); Patrick O'Neal (half-brother); Redmond O'Neal (half-brother)
- Awards: Academy Award for Best Supporting Actress; Paper Moon (1973)

Tatum Beatrice O'Neal (born November 5, 1963) is an American actress. At age ten, she became the youngest person ever to win a competitive Academy Award, for her performance as Addie Loggins in Paper Moon co-starring her father, Ryan O'Neal. She later starred in the films The Bad News Bears, Nickelodeon, and Little Darlings, and appeared in guest roles in the television series Sex and the City, 8 Simple Rules, and Law & Order: Criminal Intent.

== Family background ==
O'Neal was born in the Westwood area of Los Angeles, California, to actors Ryan O'Neal and Joanna Moore. Her brother, Griffin, was born in 1964. In 1967, her parents divorced and her father quickly married actress Leigh Taylor-Young, together having Tatum's half-brother, Patrick. The two divorced in 1973. Tatum has another half-brother, Redmond, from Ryan O'Neal's relationship with actress Farrah Fawcett. O'Neal's mother died of lung cancer at age 63, after a career in which she appeared in such movies as Walk on the Wild Side and Follow That Dream. Her paternal ancestry is Irish, English, and Ashkenazi Jewish.

== Career ==
=== Young career ===
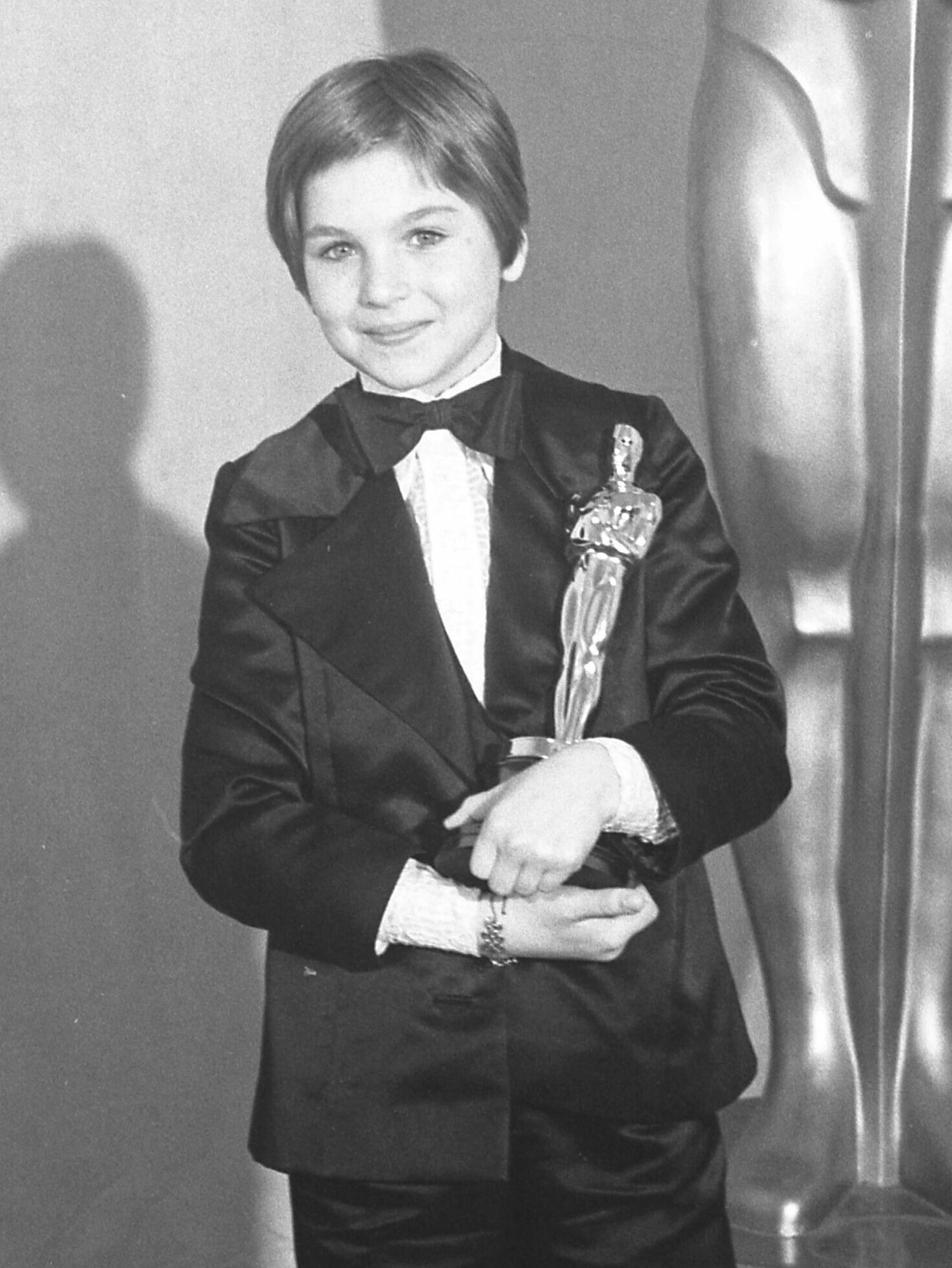
O'Neal in 1974, winning the Academy Award for Best Supporting Actress for Paper Moon

On April 2, 1974, at age ten, Tatum O'Neal won the Academy Award for Best Supporting Actress and the Golden Globe Award for New Star of the Year – Actress for her performance in Paper Moon, released in May 1973. The youngest ever to win a competitive Academy Award, she turned nine years old during filming in autumn 1972. O'Neal played the role of Addie Loggins, a child con artist being tutored by a Depression-era grifter played by her father. In her 2010 appearance on RuPaul's Drag Race, O'Neal stated that her father had not attended the Academy Awards ceremony with her due to his busy schedule.

O'Neal starred in films such as The Bad News Bears (1976) with Walter Matthau, International Velvet (1978) with Christopher Plummer and Anthony Hopkins, and Little Darlings (1980) with Kristy McNichol, and co-starred in Nickelodeon (1976) with her father and in Circle of Two (1980) with Richard Burton.

She was cast in Split Image but had to be let go during filming because she was too young (seventeen) for night scenes and was replaced by Karen Allen. She appeared as the title character in the Faerie Tale Theatre episode "Goldilocks and the Three Bears" (1984).

=== Later career ===
O'Neal appeared in only five films during the next 15 years, one of them being Basquiat (1993) as Cynthia Kruger.

In the early 2000s, O'Neal returned to acting with guest appearances in Sex and the City, 8 Simple Rules for Dating My Teenage Daughter, and Law & Order: Criminal Intent. In 2005, O'Neal began a recurring role as Maggie Gavin in the firehouse drama series Rescue Me, portraying the unbalanced and lively sister of Tommy Gavin, played by Denis Leary.

In January 2006, she participated in the second season of ABC's reality series Dancing with the Stars with professional partner Nick Kosovich. They were eliminated in the second round. She went on to do commentary for the series on Entertainment Tonight.

From 2006 to 2007, she portrayed the vindictive and psychotic Blythe Hunter in the MyNetworkTV drama Wicked Wicked Games. She appears opposite Nashawn Kearse and Vanessa Williams in the film My Brother (2007).

In 2008, she appeared in the Lifetime original film Fab Five: The Texas Cheerleader Scandal. The film is based on a true story which took place at McKinney North High School in Texas. She portrayed the mother of the main character, Brooke Tippit, and became close friends with Ashley Benson, the actress who played her character's daughter, whom she mentored in acting.

In 2021, O'Neal appeared in the film Not to Forget, which aimed to raise awareness and funds for the fight against Alzheimer's disease. The movie, directed by Valerio Zanoli, stars Karen Grassle and five Academy Award winners: O'Neal, Cloris Leachman, Louis Gossett Jr., George Chakiris, and Olympia Dukakis.

== Personal life ==
=== Relationships and family ===
In her 2004 autobiography, Tatum O'Neal recalled an "awkward" kiss with 17-year-old singer Michael Jackson when she was 12, adding that he often spoke about sex. Reports beginning in 1977 speculated that the two were dating, which Jackson appeared to confirm in 1978. In his 1988 memoir Moonwalk, Jackson described O'Neal as his "first love." In the 2003 documentary Living with Michael Jackson, Jackson claimed that O'Neal had tried to seduce him, but that he was frightened by the idea of sex. O'Neal strongly denied those claims, explaining that Jackson had a "very vivid imagination."

O'Neal's relationship with tennis player John McEnroe began in 1984 and she moved into his Central Park West apartment in New York City. They married in 1986. The couple have three children. They separated in November 1992 and were divorced in 1994. Following the divorce, O'Neal's drug problems reemerged and she developed an addiction to heroin. As a result, McEnroe obtained custody of the children in 1998.

In 2011, Tatum and her father began to restore their relationship after 25 years. Their reunion and reconciliation process was captured in the short-lived Oprah Winfrey Network series Ryan and Tatum: The O'Neals. In 2015, she said she had begun dating women, while choosing not to identify herself as homosexual, bisexual or heterosexual, saying, "I'm not one or the other."

=== Drug arrest ===
On June 1, 2008, O'Neal was arrested for buying crack cocaine near her Manhattan apartment building. When police searched her, they allegedly found two bags of drugs—one of crack cocaine, one of powder cocaine—and an unused crack pipe. She was charged with a misdemeanor criminal possession of a controlled substance. Authorities released her without bail. On July 2, 2008, O'Neal pleaded guilty to disorderly conduct in connection with the arrest and agreed to spend two half-day sessions in a drug treatment program.

=== Stroke ===
In May 2020, O'Neal suffered a massive stroke caused by a prescription drug overdose. She was discovered unconscious by a friend, and the stroke left her in a coma for a month and a half. When she reawakened, she could not speak. She has since struggled to relearn everything.

=== Autobiographies ===
In her 2004 autobiography, A Paper Life, O'Neal alleged that she was molested by her father's drug dealer when she was 12. She also alleges physical and emotional abuse by her father, much of which she attributed to drug use. She also detailed her heroin addiction and its effects on her relationship with her children. Her father denied the allegations. In a prepared statement, Ryan O'Neal said: "It is a sad day when malicious lies are told in order to become a 'bestseller.'"

In 2011, O'Neal wrote a new collection of memoirs, Found: A Daughter's Journey Home, which dealt with her tempestuous relationship with her father, volatile marriage to McEnroe, and recent drug arrest.

== Published works ==
- Tatum O'Neal (2005). A Paper Life. William Morrow Paperbacks. ISBN 0-06-054097-4.
- Tatum O'Neal; Hilary Liftin (2011). Found: A Daughter's Journey Home – An Inspiring Hollywood Memoir of Recovery and Hard-Won Insights. William Morrow Paperbacks. ISBN 978-0062066565.

== Filmography ==
=== Film ===
| Year | Title | Role | Notes |
|---|---|---|---|
| 1973 | Paper Moon | Addie Loggins | Academy Award for Best Supporting Actress; David di Donatello Award for Best Foreign Actress (tied with Barbra Streisand for The Way We Were); Golden Globe Award for New Star Of The Year – Actress; Nominated – Golden Globe Award for Best Actress – Motion Picture Musical or Comedy |
| 1976 | The Bad News Bears | Amanda Whurlitzer | |
| 1976 | Nickelodeon | Alice Forsyte | |
| 1978 | International Velvet | Sarah Brown | |
| 1980 | Circle of Two | Sarah Norton | |
| 1980 | Little Darlings | Ferris Whitney | |
| 1982 | Prisoners | Christie | Unreleased |
| 1985 | Certain Fury | Scarlet | |
| 1992 | Little Noises | Stella | |
| 1996 | Basquiat | Cynthia Kruger | |
| 2002 | The Scoundrel's Wife | Camille Picou | US video title: The Home Front; San Diego Film Festival Award for Best Actress |
| 2003 | The Technical Writer | Slim | |
| 2006 | My Brother | Erica | |
| 2008 | Saving Grace B. Jones | Grace B. Jones | |
| 2010 | The Runaways | Marie Harmon | |
| 2010 | Last Will | Hayden Emery | |
| 2012 | This Is 40 | Realtor | Cameo |
| 2013 | Mr. Sophistication | Kim Waters | |
| 2015 | Sweet Lorraine | Lorraine Bebee | |
| 2015 | She's Funny That Way | Waitress | Cameo |
| 2017 | Rock Paper Dead | Dr. Evelyn Bauer | |
| 2018 | God's Not Dead: A Light in Darkness | Barbara Solomon | |
| 2019 | The Assent | Dr. Hawkins | |
| 2020 | Troubled Waters | Kim Waters | |
| 2021 | Not to Forget | Doctor | |

=== Television ===
| Year | Title | Role | Notes |
|---|---|---|---|
| 1984 | Faerie Tale Theatre | Goldilocks | Episode: "Goldilocks and the Three Bears" |
| 1989 | CBS Schoolbreak Special | Kim | Episode: "15 and Getting Straight" |
| 1993 | Woman on the Run: The Lawrencia Bembenek Story | Laurie Bembenek | TV movie |
| 2003 | Sex and the City | Kyra | Episode: "A Woman's Right to Shoes" |
| 2004 | 8 Simple Rules | Ms. McKenna | Episode: "Opposites Attract: Part 3: Night of the Locust" |
| 2004 | Law & Order: Criminal Intent | Kelly Garnett | Episode: "Semi-Detached" |
| 2005 | Ultimate Film Fanatic | Judge | |
| 2005–2011 | Rescue Me | Maggie | Recurring role (Seasons 2–3, 5–7), Main role (Season 4); 39 episodes |
| 2006 | Dancing with the Stars | Herself | 5 episodes |
| 2006 | Wicked Wicked Games | Blythe Hunter | 51 episodes |
| 2008 | Fab Five: The Texas Cheerleader Scandal | Lorene Tippit | TV movie |
| 2010 | RuPaul's Drag Race | Herself | Episode: "The Diva Awards" |
| 2011 | Ryan and Tatum: The O'Neals | Herself | |
| 2015 | Hell's Kitchen | Herself | Episode: "6 Chefs Compete" |
| 2017 | Criminal Minds | Miranda White | Episode: "Assistance Is Futile" |
| 2018 | Runaway Romance | Veronica Adson | TV movie |

== See also ==
- List of oldest and youngest Academy Award winners and nominees
