= Ryan O'Neal =

American actor (1941–2023)

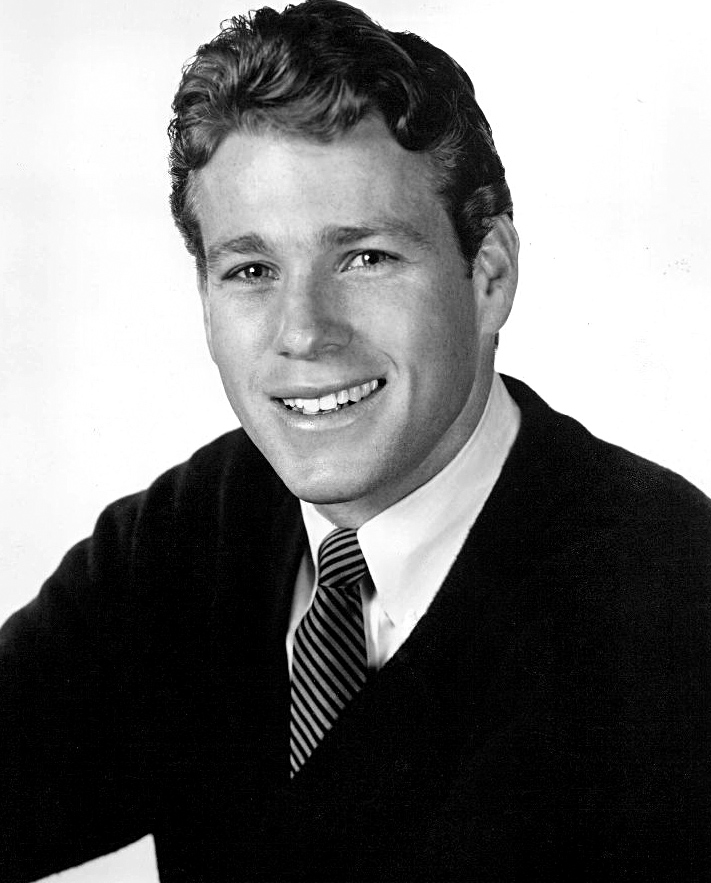
- O'Neal in 1968
- Born: Charles Patrick Ryan O'Neal; April 20, 1941; Los Angeles, California, U.S.
- Died: December 8, 2023 (aged 82); Santa Monica, California, U.S.
- Resting place: Pierce Brothers Westwood Village Memorial Park and Mortuary
- Occupations: Actor; boxer
- Years active: 1960–2017
- Spouses: Joanna Moore (m. 1963; div. 1967); Leigh Taylor-Young (m. 1967; div. 1974)
- Partner: Farrah Fawcett (1979–1997; 2001–2009, her death)
- Children: 4, including Tatum, Griffin, and Patrick
- Father: Charles O'Neal
- Website: ryanoneal.com

Charles Patrick Ryan O'Neal (April 20, 1941 – December 8, 2023) was an American actor. Born in Los Angeles, he trained as an amateur boxer before beginning a career in acting in 1960.

In 1964, he landed the role of Rodney Harrington on the ABC nighttime soap opera Peyton Place. It was an instant hit and boosted O'Neal's career. He later found success in films, most notably in the romantic drama Love Story (1970), for which he was nominated for the Academy Award for Best Actor and the Golden Globe Award for Best Actor – Motion Picture Drama; Peter Bogdanovich's What's Up, Doc? (1972); Paper Moon (1973), which earned him a nomination for the Golden Globe Award for Best Actor – Motion Picture Musical or Comedy; Stanley Kubrick's Barry Lyndon (1975), in which he portrayed the title character; Richard Attenborough's A Bridge Too Far (1977); and Walter Hill's The Driver (1978).

From 2006 to 2017, he had a recurring role in the Fox television series Bones as Max, the father of the show's eponymous protagonist.

== Early life and education ==
O'Neal was born in Los Angeles, on April 20, 1941, the elder son of actress Patricia (née O'Callaghan) and novelist/screenwriter Charles O'Neal. (Note: A minority of sources give O'Neal's full name as simply Patrick Ryan O'Neal.) His father was of Irish and English descent, while his mother was of paternal Irish and maternal Jewish ancestry. His only sibling, younger brother, Kevin O'Neal (1945–2023), was also an actor as well as a screenwriter.

O'Neal attended University High School in Los Angeles, and trained there to become a Golden Gloves boxer. During the late 1950s, his father had a job writing on a television series called Citizen Soldier, and moved the family to Munich, where O'Neal attended Munich American High School.

== Career ==
=== 1960–1969: Television roles ===
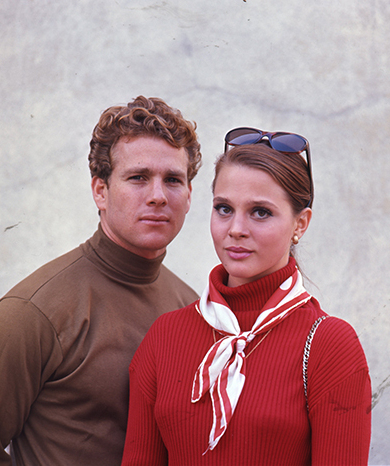
O'Neal and Leigh Taylor-Young in a Peyton Place publicity photo in 1967

While struggling academically at a Munich high school in the late 1950s, O'Neal was assisted by his mother in securing work as an extra and stuntman on the television series Tales of the Vikings, which was filming in Germany at the time. O'Neal worked on it as an extra and stuntman and became interested in acting. O'Neal returned to the U.S. and tried to make it as an actor. He made his first television appearance guest starring on The Many Loves of Dobie Gillis episode "The Hunger Strike" in 1960. He followed this with guest slots on The Untouchables, General Electric Theater, The DuPont Show with June Allyson, Laramie, Two Faces West, Westinghouse Playhouse (several episodes), Bachelor Father, My Three Sons, Leave It to Beaver episode "Wally Goes Steady" in 1961, and The Virginian. He was under contract to Universal but they let it lapse. From 1962 to 1963, O'Neal was a regular on NBC's Empire, a modern-day western, where he played "Tal Garrett" in support of Richard Egan. It ran for 33 episodes. In 1963, the series was revived as Redigo, but O'Neal turned down the chance to reprise his role. When the series ended, O'Neal went back to guest-starring on shows such as Perry Mason and Wagon Train.

In 1964 he was cast as Rodney Harrington in the prime time serial drama Peyton Place. O'Neal said he got the role because "the studio was looking for a young Doug McClure". The series was a big success, making national names of its cast, including O'Neal. Several were offered movie roles, including Mia Farrow, Rosemary's Baby (1968), and Barbara Parkins, Valley of the Dolls (1967), and O'Neal was keen to do films. During the series' run O'Neal appeared in a pilot for a proposed series, European Eye (1968). He was also signed to ABC for a recording contract. O'Neal's first lead in a feature came with The Big Bounce (1969), based on an Elmore Leonard novel. In 1969, he appeared in a TV version of Under the Yum Yum Tree (1963).

=== 1970–1980: Film stardom ===
In 1970, O'Neal played an Olympic athlete in The Games. The film had been co-written by Erich Segal, who recommended O'Neal for the lead in the romantic drama Love Story (1970), based on Segal's novel and script. A number of actors had turned down the role including Beau Bridges and Jon Voight before it was offered to O'Neal. His fee was $25,000; he said he had an offer that paid five times as much to appear in a Jerry Lewis film, but O'Neal knew that Love Story was the better prospect and selected that instead. Paramount Pictures studio head, Robert Evans, who was married to the film's female lead, Ali MacGraw, said they tested 14 other actors but no one compared to O'Neal; he said the part was "a Cary Grant role – a handsome leading man with lots of emotion." "I hope the young people like it", O'Neal said before the film came out. "I don't want to go back to TV. I don't want to go back to those NAB conventions." Love Story turned out to be a box office phenomenon, making O'Neal a star and earning him nominations for the Academy Award for Best Actor and the Golden Globe Award for Best Actor – Motion Picture Drama, although O'Neal was bitter that he was never given a percentage of the profits, unlike co-star Ali MacGraw.

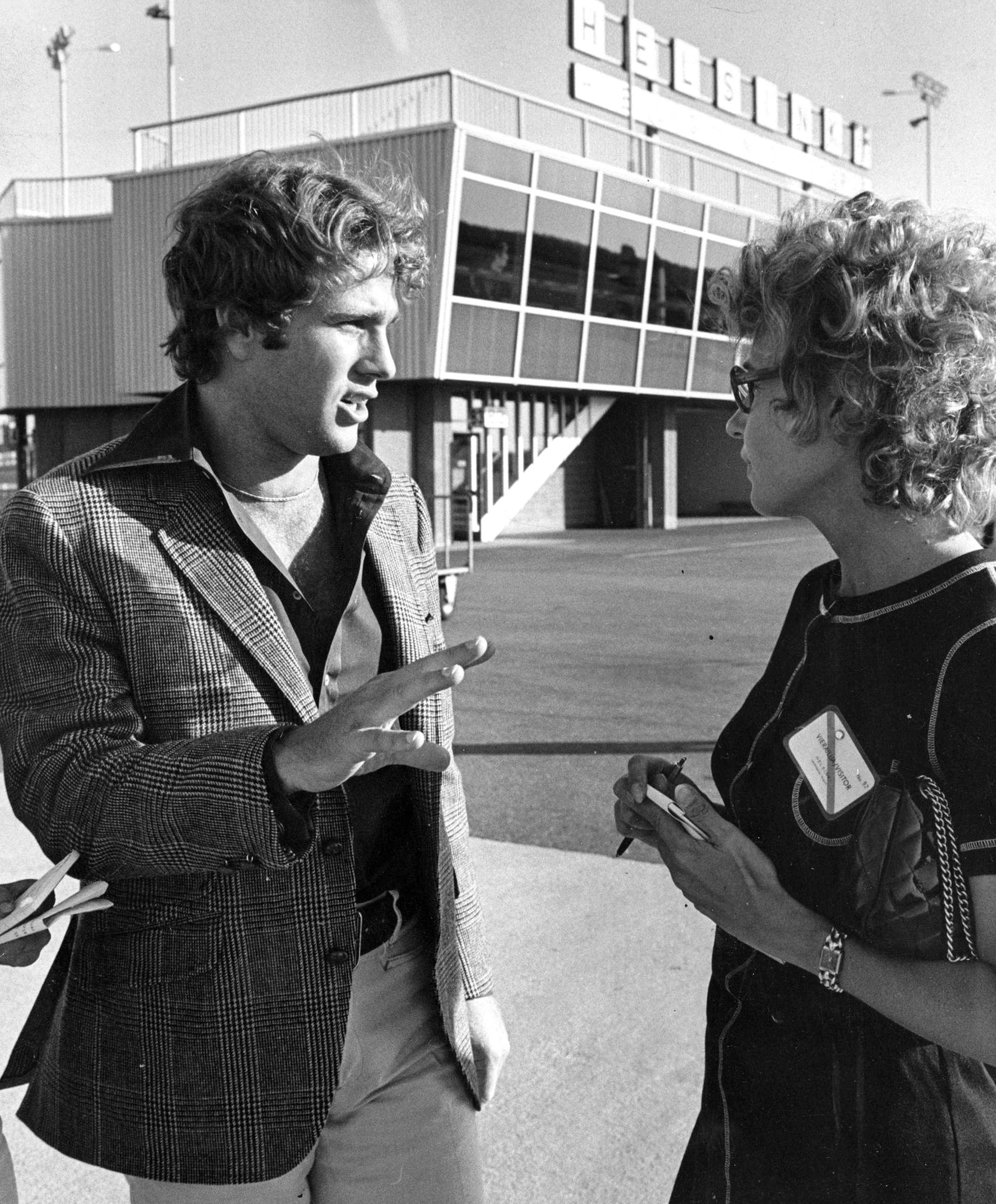
O'Neal in Finland, 1970

In between the film's production and release, O'Neal appeared in a TV movie written by Eric Ambler, Love Hate Love (1971), which received good ratings. He also made a Western, Wild Rovers (1971) with William Holden for director Blake Edwards. Wild Rovers, badly cut by MGM, was considerably less popular than Love Story. O'Neal was going to make another film for MGM, Deadly Honeymoon (1974), from a novel by Lawrence Block. However, O'Neal pulled out. Peter Bogdanovich later said MGM head Jim Aubrey was "cruel" to O'Neal.

Director Nic Roeg wanted O'Neal to appear opposite Julie Christie in an adaptation of Out of Africa that was never made. Instead, O'Neal starred in the screwball comedy What's Up, Doc? (1972) for Bogdanovich and opposite Barbra Streisand. The film was the third-highest-grossing film of 1972 and led to his receiving an offer to star in a movie for Stanley Kubrick, Barry Lyndon. While that film was in pre-production, O'Neal played a jewel thief in The Thief Who Came to Dinner (1972) opposite Jacqueline Bisset and Warren Oates. Then he was reunited with Bogdanovich for Paper Moon (1973) in which he starred opposite his daughter Tatum O'Neal. His performance in the film earned him a nomination for the Golden Globe Award for Best Actor – Motion Picture Musical or Comedy, and he was voted by exhibitors as the second-most-popular star of 1973 in the United States, behind Clint Eastwood.

O'Neal spent over a year making Barry Lyndon (1975) for Kubrick. The resulting film, despite being nominated for seven Academy Awards, was considered a commercial disappointment and had a mixed critical reception; it won O'Neal a Harvard Lampoon Award for the Worst Actor of 1975. Reflecting in 1985, O'Neal said the film was "all right but he [Kubrick] completely changed the picture during the year he spent editing it". The film's reputation has risen in recent years but O'Neal said his career never recovered from the film's reception.

O'Neal had been originally meant to star in Bogdanovich's musical At Long Last Love but was replaced by Burt Reynolds. However he made the screwball comedy Nickelodeon (1976) with Reynolds, Bogdanovich and Tatum O'Neal, for a fee of $750,000. The film flopped at the box office. O'Neal followed this with a small role in the all-star war film A Bridge Too Far (1977), playing General James Gavin. O'Neal's performance as a hardened general was much criticised, although O'Neal was only a year older than Gavin at the time of the events in the film. "Can I help it if I photograph like I'm 16 and they gave me a helmet that was too big for my head?" he later said. "At least I did my own parachute jump." The film was the 6th most popular movie of 1977.

O'Neal initially turned down a reported $3 million to star in Oliver's Story (1978), a sequel to Love Story. Instead he appeared in the car-chase film The Driver (1978), directed by Walter Hill, who had written The Thief Who Came to Dinner. This was a box office disappointment in the U.S. but, like A Bridge Too Far, did better overseas. Hill later said he "was so pleased with Ryan in the movie and I was very disappointed that people didn't particularly give him any credit for what he did. To me, he's the best he's ever been. I cannot imagine another actor." O'Neal was meant to follow this with The Champ (1979), directed by Franco Zeffirelli, but decided to pull out after Zeffirelli refused to cast O'Neal's son Griffin opposite him. Instead he agreed to make Oliver's Story after all once the script was rewritten. However the film was a flop at the box office.

"What I have to do now, seriously, is win a few hearts as an actor," he said in 1978. "The way Cary Grant did. I know I've got a lot of winning to do. But I'm young enough. I'll get there..." Around this time, O'Neal was meant to star in The Bodyguard, from a Lawrence Kasdan script, opposite Diana Ross for director John Boorman. However the film fell over when Ross pulled out, and it would not be made until 1992, with Kevin Costner in O'Neal's old role and Whitney Houston in Ross' place. There was some talk he would appear in a film directed by Michelangelo Antonioni, Suffer or Die, but this did not happen.

O'Neal instead played a boxer in a comedy, The Main Event, reuniting him with Streisand. He received a fee of $1 million plus a percentage of the profits. The Main Event was a sizeable hit at the box office. Also in 1979, he produced a documentary, The Contender, about a boxer he managed.

A 1980 profile of O'Neal described him:

Unlike most stars of the post-Hoffman era he is very handsome, especially when moustached: he has blond curly hair and a toothpaste smile: he seems to lead an interesting life. What is on screen is, er, less interesting, but still agreeable. Maybe he would really come on if he had the apprenticeship of the stars of the 30s: for he is, to underline the point, a throwback to that era. There are no nervous tics, solemnity is at bag; his is an easy, genial presence, and thank heaven for it!

=== 1981–1987: Career fluctuations ===
O'Neal was looking next to act in the lead role in the film version of The Thorn Birds to be directed by Arthur Hiller, but the book ended up being adapted as a miniseries. Instead O'Neal made a British-financed thriller, Green Ice (1981), for the most money he had ever received up front. The movie had a troublesome production (the original director quit during filming) and flopped at the box office. He had a cameo in Circle of Two, a film his daughter made with Richard Burton. O'Neal said Burton told him during filming he was "five years away from winning acceptance as a serious actor". "On the other hand", O'Neal added, "my agent, Sue Mengers says I'm right on the threshold. Split the difference, that's two and a half years. One good picture, that's all I need...."

However, in the early 1980s he focused on comedies. He received $2 million for the lead in So Fine. This was followed by Partners (1982), a farce written by Francis Veber in which O'Neal played a straight cop who goes undercover as one half of a gay couple. He then played a film director loosely based on Peter Bogdanovich in Irreconcilable Differences (1984); he received no upfront fee but got a percentage of the profits. It was a minor box office success. A 1984 profile called him "the Billy Martin of Hollywood, whether it's his love affair with Farrah Fawcett ... his precocious actor daughter Tatum or fisticuffs with his son Griffin. He just can't seem to stay out of the news." O'Neal said he felt more like Rocky Marciano, "wondering why guys are always picking fights with me. If I'm in a good picture, they'll like me. If I'm not they'll hate me. Hey I'm mad too when I don't make good pictures."

O'Neal said too many of the roles he had played were "off the beaten path for [him]". In particular he regretted doing The Thief Who Came to Dinner, A Bridge Too Far, The Driver, So Fine, Partners, and Green Ice. He blamed this in part on having to pay alimony and child support. He also said agent Sue Mengers encouraged him to constantly work. "If I could get a good director to choose me for a picture, I was okay", he said. "But they stopped calling me in the mid-70s.... I made a whole bunch of pictures that didn't make any money and people lost interest in me.... Directors take me reluctantly. I feel I'm lucky to be here in the first place and they know it too. I'm a glamour boy, a Hollywood product. I have a TV background and they can point to the silly movies I've made." In 1985, O'Neal tried something different, playing an L.A. Herald Examiner sportswriter and sports columnist who also gambles far too much in Fever Pitch (1985), the final movie for director Richard Brooks. Even less conventional was Tough Guys Don't Dance (1987) for director Norman Mailer. Both movies flopped at the box office, and received poor reviews.

=== 1988–2017: Later roles ===
O'Neal had a supporting part in a Liza Minnelli TV special Sam Found Out: A Triple Play (1988), and also supported in the romantic comedy Chances Are (1989). He returned to TV opposite his then-partner Farrah Fawcett in Small Sacrifices (1989). He and Fawcett made a short-lived CBS series, Good Sports (1991), which lasted 15 episodes. O'Neal co starred with Katharine Hepburn in the TV movie The Man Upstairs (1992) and had a cameo in Fawcett's Man of the House (1995). He had a good role in Faithful (1996) with Cher. It was directed by Paul Mazursky who later said of O'Neal:

He's sweet as sugar, and he's volatile. He's got some of that Irish stuff in him, and he can blow up a bit. One day he was doing a scene, and I said, "Bring it down a little bit," and Ryan said, "I quit! You can't say 'Bring it down' to me that loud!" I said, "If you quit, I'm going to break your nose." He started to cry. He's sort of a big baby at times, but he's a good guy, and he's very talented. He's had a strange career, but he was a monster star.

O'Neal had a supporting role in Hacks (1997) and the lead in An Alan Smithee Film: Burn Hollywood Burn (1998). He had the third lead in Zero Effect (1999) and was top billed in The List (2000). He had a semi-recurring role in Bull (2001) and supporting parts in Epoch (2001), People I Know (2002) with Al Pacino, Gentleman B. (2002), and Malibu's Most Wanted (2003). O'Neal had a regular part on the TV series Miss Match (2003) with Alicia Silverstone, which ran for 18 episodes. Around this time he guest starred on shows such as Desperate Housewives and 90210. In 2009 he said that he "made a tremendous amount of money on real estate".

O'Neal was a recurring character on Fox's Bones from seasons 2 to 12, with his final episode airing in February 2017. In 2011, Ryan and Tatum attempted to restore their broken father/daughter relationship after 25 years. Their reunion and reconciliation process was captured in the Oprah Winfrey Network series Ryan and Tatum: The O'Neals, which O'Neal produced. It ran only nine episodes, and he later said that it left their relationship in a worse state than before. O'Neal could be seen in Slumber Party Slaughter (2012) and Knight of Cups (2015) in a small role.

In 2016, O'Neal reunited with Love Story co-star Ali MacGraw in a staging of A. R. Gurney's play Love Letters. In February 2021, O'Neal and MacGraw were honored with stars on the Hollywood Walk of Fame, nearly 50 years after the release of Love Story.

== Personal life ==
=== Relationships ===
O'Neal married his first wife, actress Joanna Moore, in 1963. They had two children before separating in 1966. Moore eventually lost custody of their children to O'Neal as a result of her alcoholism and drug addiction.

His second marriage was to actress and his Peyton Place co-star Leigh Taylor-Young, with whom he had a son. They remained friends after divorcing in 1973. "I could speak to parts of Ryan like temper and volatility and reactivity, but I deeply know his goodness", Taylor-Young said.

O'Neal was in a relationship with actress Farrah Fawcett from 1979 to 1997. The relationship was tumultuous due to his infidelity and volatile behavior. O'Neal and Fawcett reunited in 2001 and were together until her death in 2009.

"I got married at 21, and I was not a real mature 21," said O'Neal. "My first child was born when I was 22. I was a man's man; I didn't discover women until I was married, and then it was too late." He had romances with Ursula Andress, Bianca Jagger, Anouk Aimée, Jacqueline Bisset, Barbra Streisand, Joan Collins, Diana Ross, and Anjelica Huston. According to his daughter Tatum O'Neal, he also had an affair with Melanie Griffith. In her 2014 memoir, Anjelica Huston claimed that O'Neal physically abused her.

=== Children ===
O'Neal had four children, including Tatum O'Neal and Griffin O'Neal with Moore, Patrick O'Neal with Taylor-Young.

For several years, O'Neal was estranged from his three elder children. "I'm a hopeless father. I don't know why. I don't think I was supposed to be a father. Just look around at my work—they're either in jail or they should be," he told Vanity Fair. In her autobiography, A Paper Life, Tatum wrote that she had suffered physical and emotional abuse as a result of her father's drug abuse. Griffin O'Neal also suggested their family's problems stemmed from Ryan. "My father gave me cocaine when I was 11 and insisted I take it," he said. Griffin added, "He was a very abusive, narcissistic psychopath. He gets so mad he can't control anything he's doing."

In 2007, O'Neal was arrested for shooting at Griffin, which he claimed was in self-defense; the charges were dropped. O'Neal refused to allow Griffin to attend Fawcett's funeral in 2009. At Fawcett's funeral, he initially did not recognize his daughter:"I had just put the casket in the hearse and I was watching it drive away when a beautiful blonde woman comes up and embraces me. I said to her, 'You have a drink on you? You have a car?' She said, 'Daddy, it's me--Tatum!' I was just trying to be funny with a strange Swedish woman, and it's my daughter. It's so sick."

In 2011, Tatum published a book with her father and appeared with him on the TV show Ryan and Tatum: the O'Neals. In August of that year, O'Neal, Tatum, and Patrick attended Redmond's court appearance on firearms and drug charges.

== Illness and death ==
In 2001, O'Neal was diagnosed with chronic myelogenous leukemia (CML). After struggling with leukemia, O'Neal was frequently seen at Fawcett's side when she was battling cancer. He told People magazine, "It's a love story. I just don't know how to play this one. I won't know this world without her. Cancer is an insidious enemy." In April 2012, O'Neal stated he had been diagnosed with stage 4 prostate cancer. He later stated it was stage 2.

O'Neal died at Saint John's Health Center in Santa Monica, California, on December 8, 2023, at the age of 82. His cause of death was congestive heart failure, with cardiomyopathy listed as a contributing factor. O'Neal was interred next to Fawcett at Pierce Brothers Westwood Village Memorial Park and Mortuary.

== Filmography ==
=== Film ===
Year	Title	Role	Notes
1969	The Big Bounce	Jack Ryan	
1970	The Games	Scott Reynolds	
1970	Love Story	Oliver Barrett IV	
1971	Wild Rovers	Frank Post	
1972	What's Up, Doc?	Dr. Howard Bannister	
1973	The Thief Who Came to Dinner	Webster McGee	
1973	Paper Moon	Moses Pray	
1975	Barry Lyndon	Barry Lyndon	
1976	Nickelodeon	Leo Harrigan	
1977	A Bridge Too Far	Brigadier General James M. Gavin	
1978	The Driver	The Driver	
1978	Oliver's Story	Oliver Barrett IV	
1979	The Main Event	Eddie 'Kid Natural' Scanlon	
1981	So Fine	Bobby Fine	
1981	Circle of Two	Theatre patron	Uncredited
1981	Green Ice	Joseph Wiley	
1982	Partners	Sgt. Benson	
1984	Irreconcilable Differences	Albert Brodsky	
1985	Fever Pitch	Steve Taggart	
1987	Tough Guys Don't Dance	Tim Madden	
1989	Chances Are	Philip Train	
1995	Man of the House	Man with Kite	Uncredited
1996	Faithful	Jack Connor	
1997	Hacks	Dr. Applefield	Alternate titles: Sink or Swim and The Big Twist
1997	An Alan Smithee Film: Burn Hollywood Burn	James Edmunds	
1998	Zero Effect	Gregory Stark	
1999	Coming Soon	Dick	
2000	The List	Richard Miller	
2001	Epoch	Dr. Allan Lysander	
2002	People I Know	Cary Launer	
2003	Gentleman B.	Phil (Bank manager)	Alternate title: The Gentleman Bandit
2003	Malibu's Most Wanted	Bill Gluckman	
2012	Slumber Party Slaughter	William O'Toole	Slasher film
2015	Knight of Cups	Ryan	
2015	Unity	Narrator	

=== Television ===
Year	Title	Role	Notes
1960	The Many Loves of Dobie Gillis	Herm	Episode: "The Hunger Strike"
1960	The Untouchables	Bellhop (uncredited)	Episode: "Jack 'Legs' Diamonds"
1960	General Electric Theater	Art Anderson	Episode: "The Playoff"
1961	The DuPont Show with June Allyson	Cadet Wade Farrell	Episode: "Without Fear"
1961	Bachelor Father	Marty Braden	Episode: "Bentley and the Great Debate"
1961	Laramie	Johnny Jacobs	Episode: "Bitter Glory"
1961	Leave It to Beaver	Tom Henderson	Episode: "Wally Goes Steady"
1962	My Three Sons	Chug Williams	Episode: "Chug and Robbie"
1962–1963	Empire	Tal Garrett	31 episodes
1963	The Virginian	Ben Anders	Episode: "It Takes a Big Man"
1964	Perry Mason	John Carew	Episode: "The Case of the Bountiful Beauty"
1964	Wagon Train	Paul Phillips	Episode: "The Nancy Styles Story"
1964–1969	Peyton Place	Rodney Harrington	501 episodes
1971	Love Hate Love	Russ Emery	Television film
1989	Small Sacrifices	Lew Lewiston	Television film
1991	Good Sports	Bobby Tannen	15 episodes
1992	The Man Upstairs	Mooney Polaski	Television film
1992	1775	Jeremy Proctor	Unsold TV pilot
1995	The Larry Sanders Show	Himself	2 episodes
2000–2001	Bull	Robert Roberts, Jr.	6 episodes
2001	Epoch	Allen Lynsdar	Television film
2003	Miss Match	Jerry Fox	18 episodes
2005	Desperate Housewives	Rodney Scavo	Episode: "Your Fault"
2010	90210	Spence Montgomery	3 episodes
2006–2017	Bones	Max Keenan	24 episodes

== Awards and nominations ==
Year	Award	Film	Category	Result
1971	Academy Awards	Love Story	Best Actor	Nominated
1971	Golden Globe Awards	Love Story	Best Actor in a Motion Picture – Drama	Nominated
1971	David di Donatello Awards	Love Story	Best Foreign Actor	Won
1974	Golden Globe Awards	Paper Moon	Best Actor in a Motion Picture – Musical or Comedy	Nominated
1988	Golden Raspberry Awards	Tough Guys Don't Dance	Worst Actor	Nominated
1990	Golden Raspberry Awards	–	Worst Actor of the 1980s	Nominated
1998	Golden Raspberry Awards	An Alan Smithee Film: Burn Hollywood Burn	Worst Actor	Nominated
2005	Golden Raspberry Awards	–	Worst Razzie Loser of Our First 25 Years	Nominated
2021	Hollywood Walk of Fame	–	Motion pictures	Inducted

== Amateur boxing record ==
Based on various sources.

Amateur boxing record
Result	Record	Opponent	Method	Date	Round	Time	Event	Location
Win	12-4	(United States) Frankie Lohman	KO	1959	1			Munich, West Germany
Loss	11-4	(United States) Tony Foramero	PTS	1957	3		Golden Gloves Tournament	Los Angeles
Win	11-3	(United States) Stevie Rouse	KO	1957	1		Golden Gloves Tournament (Finals)	Los Angeles
Win	10-3	(United States) Chuck Newell	PTS	1957	3		Golden Gloves Tournament (Semi-finals)	Los Angeles
Win	9-3	(United States) Alvin "Allen" Walker	KO	1957	1			Los Angeles
Win	8-3	(United States) Samuel Roland	Foul	1956	1			Hollywood, Florida
Win	7-3	(United States) Leonard Wallace	KO	1956	1			Los Angeles
Win	6-3	(United States) Eugene Liebert	KO	1956	1			Los Angeles
Win	5-3	(United States) Felix Morse	KO	1956	2			Los Angeles
Win	4-3	(United States) George Shay	PTS	1956	3			Hollywood, California
Win	3-3	(United States) Edmund Dowe	PTS	1956	3			Los Angeles
Win	2–3	(United States) Victor Fellsen	KO	1956	1			Los Angeles
Loss	1–3	(United States) Dal Stewart	PTS	1956	3			Los Angeles
Loss	1–2	(United States) George Shay	PTS	1956	3		Golden Gloves Tournament	Los Angeles
Win	1-1	(United States) J. Cecil Gray	PTS	1956	3		Golden Gloves Tournament	Los Angeles
Loss	0–1	(United States) J. Cecil Gray	PTS	1956	3			Los Angeles
