= Love Hate Love =

1971 American television film

- Based on: Love Hate Love by Lenard Kaufman
- Screenplay by: Eric Ambler
- Directed by: George McCowan
- Starring: Ryan O'Neal; Lesley Ann Warren; Peter Haskell
- Music by: Lyn Murray
- Country of origin: United States
- Original language: English

Production
- Executive producer: Aaron Spelling
- Producer: Joan Harrison
- Running time: 71 mins
- Production company: Aaron Spelling Productions

Original release
- Network: ABC
- Release: February 9, 1971

Love Hate Love is a 1971 American made-for-television drama film starring Ryan O'Neal.

== Premise ==
A model, Sheila, has been seeing the wealthy Leo Price, while her boyfriend, engineer Russ, has been away. Sheila breaks up with Russ. However, when Sheila sees Leo beat up Russ, she becomes aware of his dangerous temper. She decides to marry Russ instead.

Leo becomes obsessed with Sheila and tries to track her down.

== Cast ==
- Ryan O'Neal as Russ Emery
- Lesley Ann Warren as Sheila Blunden
- Peter Haskell as Leo Price
- Henry Jones as Tom Blunden
- Jack Mullaney as Eddie
- Jeff Donnell as Mary Blunden
- Stanley Adams as Wally
- Shannon Farnon as Karen Roche
- Ryan MacDonald as Lieutenant Hank Robins
- Fred Holliday as Patrolman
- Mark Tapscott as Deputy Sheriff
- Charlene Polite as Secretary

== Production ==
Ryan O'Neal made the film immediately after Love Story. Filming began in April 1970 in Lancaster, California.

== Reception ==
The film's release was held back to take advantage of the success of Love Story. The Los Angeles Times called the film "for the most part, improbably developed...O'Neal... is the main strength of this movie."

The movie was the seventh highest rating show of the week in the US, with a rating of 26.8. It was ABC's most popular show of the week. It was repeated in June and rated 20.7 one of the top ten shows in the country that week.
