= Pale Blood =

1990 film by V.V. Dachin-Hsu and Takashi Matsuoka

- Directed by: V. V. Dachin Hsu; Michael W. Leighton
- Written by: V. V. Dachin Hsu; Takashi Matsuoka
- Produced by: Omar Kaczmarczyk; Michael W. Leighton
- Starring: George Chakiris; Wings Hauser; Pamela Ludwig
- Cinematography: Gerry Lively
- Edited by: Michael Kewley; Stewart Schill
- Music by: Jan A. P. Kaczmarek
- Production company: Noble Entertainment Group
- Distributed by: Noble Entertainment Group
- Release date: January 22, 1992 (U.S.)
- Running time: 93 minutes
- Countries: United States; Hong Kong
- Language: English

Pale Blood is a 1990 direct-to-video vampire film directed by V. V. Dachin Hsu and Michael W. Leighton, written by Hsu and Takashi Matsuoka, produced by Omar Kaczmarczyk and Leighton, and starring George Chakiris, Wings Hauser, and Pamela Ludwig. It features music and performance by the punk rock band Agent Orange.

== Plot ==
Michael Fury (Chakiris) arrives in Los Angeles to investigate a series of mysterious high-profile murders where the victims have been completely drained of blood. Aiding him in his quest is Lori (Ludwig), a junior member at an investigative firm who is obsessed with the occult. Unbeknownst to her, Fury is himself a vampire. Yet, unbeknownst to Fury, Lori has been keeping a little surprise hidden too.

== Cast ==
- George Chakiris as Michael Fury
- Wings Hauser as Van Vandameer
- Pamela Ludwig as Lori
- Diana Frank as Jenny
- Darcy DeMoss as Cherry
- Earl Garnes as Harker
- Frazer Smith as Frazer Kelly
- Michael Palm as Lead Singer In Band
- Agent Orange as Band
- Steven Bramble as Lori's Date
- Randy Almazon, Frank Barajas, Sheryl Bence, Wanda Blunt, Den Daniel Jr., Sybil Danning, Marc Leighton, Michaele Leighton, Michael Shane Leighton, Michael Rosen, Rita M. Saiz, Lindsay Santos and Tom Sidell as People of the Night

== Release ==
It was released by Noble Entertainment Group in October 1990, and was also known as A Marca do Vampiro in Brazil. Pale Blood was released on VHS by IMV in Germany in 1990, and by RCA/Columbia Pictures Home Video and SVS in the United States on January 22, 1992. During the week of February 9, 1992, the film was the third best-selling LaserDisc title in the United States.

Vinegar Syndrome released Pale Blood in April 2020 on Blu-ray and DVD. As of March 2025, the Vinegar Syndrome release is out of print.

== Reception ==
The film received a B− score from Entertainment Weekly, with critic Michael Sauter praising the film for doing "something new with the vampire genre." TV Guide said, "Pale Blood positively aches to do something original with the lore of the undead. But the film never overcomes a serious anemia of good ideas and ways to handle them.

In his book Creature Features: The Science Fiction, Fantasy, and Horror Movie Guide, John Stanley praised the film as an "offbeat, stylized vampire thriller with clever twists and a bravura performance by Wings Hauser."

Brian Carnell of the Kalamazoo Gazette gave the film a middling review, critiquing Chakiris's performance as an "imitation" of Bela Lugosi's Dracula, and commented that the film would have functioned better as a short film.

=== Accolades ===
The film received a Saturn Award nomination for Best Genre Video Release.

== Sources ==
- Stanley, John (2000). Creature Features: The Science Fiction, Fantasy, and Horror Movie Guide. New York City, New York: Berkley Boulevard Books. ISBN 978-0-425-17517-0.
