= The Escape Artist (film) =

1982 film by Caleb Deschanel

- Theatrical release poster
- Directed by: Caleb Deschanel
- Screenplay by: Melissa Mathison; Stephen Zito
- Based on: The Escape Artist by David Wagoner
- Produced by: Doug Claybourne; Buck Houghton; Francis Ford Coppola
- Starring: Griffin O'Neal; Raúl Juliá; Teri Garr; Joan Hackett; Gabriel Dell; Desiderio Arnaz
- Cinematography: Stephen H. Burum
- Edited by: Arthur Schmidt
- Music by: Georges Delerue
- Production companies: Orion Pictures; Zoetrope Studios
- Distributed by: Warner Bros.
- Release dates: May 7, 1982 (USA Film Festival); May 28, 1982 (United States)
- Running time: 94 minutes
- Country: United States
- Language: English
- Box office: $143,369

The Escape Artist is a 1982 film starring Griffin O'Neal and Raúl Juliá. It was based on a book by David Wagoner, and was the feature film directorial debut of Caleb Deschanel. It was the final film of Joan Hackett, Desi Arnaz, and Gabriel Dell, and the film debut of Harry Anderson. It was also the final film performance of Jackie Coogan, though one film he had shot earlier (The Prey, which was shot in 1979) was not released until 1983, as well as the final performance of Arnaz before his death in 1986.

== Plot ==
Young and self-confident Danny Masters is the teen-aged son of the late Harry Masters, the "greatest escape artist except for Houdini". Danny himself is an accomplished magician and escape artist. He leaves home to join Uncle Burke and Aunt Sibyl in their magic/mentalist act; Sibyl welcomes him, but Burke is unenthusiastic.

Danny soon finds himself embroiled with Stu Quiñones, corrupt son of Mayor Leon Quiñones. The quest for a missing wallet (pick-pocketed by Danny) leads to the comeuppance of the crooked mayor, and separately of his vindictive and out-of-control son. Along the way, Danny comes to terms with the death of his father, the circumstances of which he did not previously know.

== Cast ==
- Raúl Juliá as Stu Quiñones
- Griffin O'Neal as Danny Masters
- Desi Arnaz as Mayor Leon Quiñones
- Teri Garr as Arlene
- Joan Hackett as Aunt Sibyl
- Gabriel Dell as Uncle Burke
- John P. Ryan as Vernon
- Elizabeth Daily as Sandra
- M. Emmet Walsh as Fritz
- Jackie Coogan as Magic Shop Owner
- Hal Williams as Cop At Mayor's Office
- Helen Page Camp as Neighbor
- David Clennon as Newspaper Editor
- Huntz Hall as Turnkey
- Harry Anderson as Harry Masters
- Isabel Cooley as Secretary
- Carlin Glynn as Treasurer's Secretary
- Margaret Ladd as Reporter
- Garry Marshall as Drummer
- Doug McGrath as The Photographer
- Richard Bradford as Sam City Treasurer (uncredited)

== Production notes ==
This film was shot in 1980, but remained unreleased for two years as it underwent extensive re-editing. The cast includes two members of the 1930s troupe the Dead End Kids: Gabriel Dell and Huntz Hall.

== Reception ==
The film received mixed to poor reviews, with critics generally praising the performances, but finding the script elements unfocused. Vincent Canby of the New York Times noted that the finished film "represents a lot more talent than is ever demonstrated on the screen."
