= George Chakiris =

American actor and dancer (born 1932)

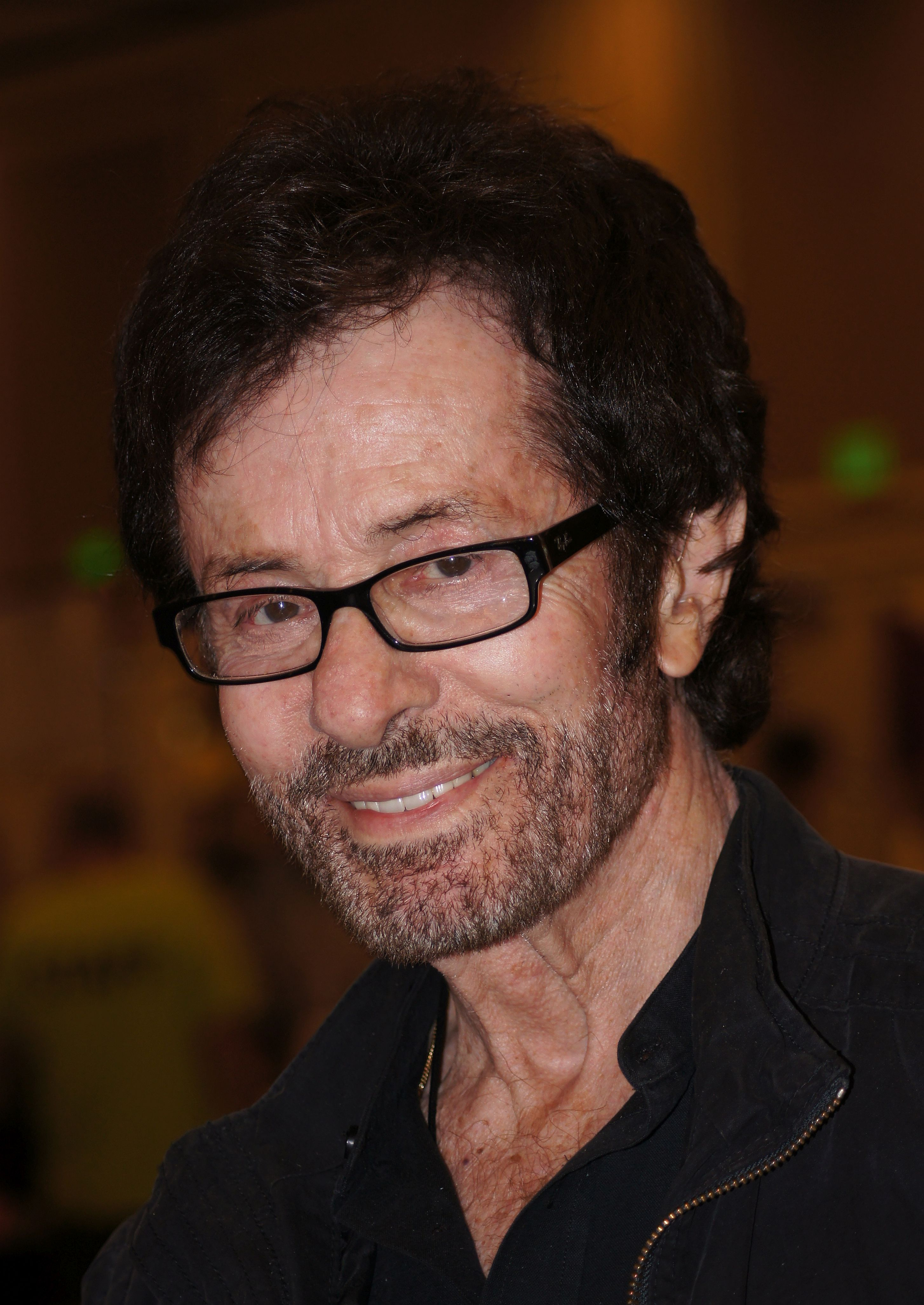
- Chakiris in 2019
- Born: September 16, 1932 (age 94); Norwood, Ohio, U.S.
- Other name: George Kerris
- Occupations: Actor, dancer
- Years active: 1947–1996, 2021
- Website: georgechakiris.com

George Chakiris (born September 16, 1932) is an American actor and dancer. He is best known for his appearance in the 1961 film version of West Side Story as Bernardo, the leader of the Sharks gang, for which he won both the Academy Award for Best Supporting Actor and the Golden Globe Award for Best Supporting Actor – Motion Picture.

== Life and career ==
=== Early life ===
Chakiris was born on September 16, 1932, in Norwood, Ohio, to Stelianos (Steve) and Zoe (née Anastasiadou) Chakiris, Greek immigrants from Turkey. He is one of eight siblings.

His family moved to Long Beach, California, in 1944. He attended Jefferson Junior High school and was graduated in 1950 from Woodrow Wilson Classical High School, both in Long Beach.

Chakiris attended one year at Long Beach City College, but wanted to pursue a career in dance, so he dropped out and moved to Hollywood. He worked in the advertising department of May Company California, a department store, and studied dance at night.

=== Early films ===
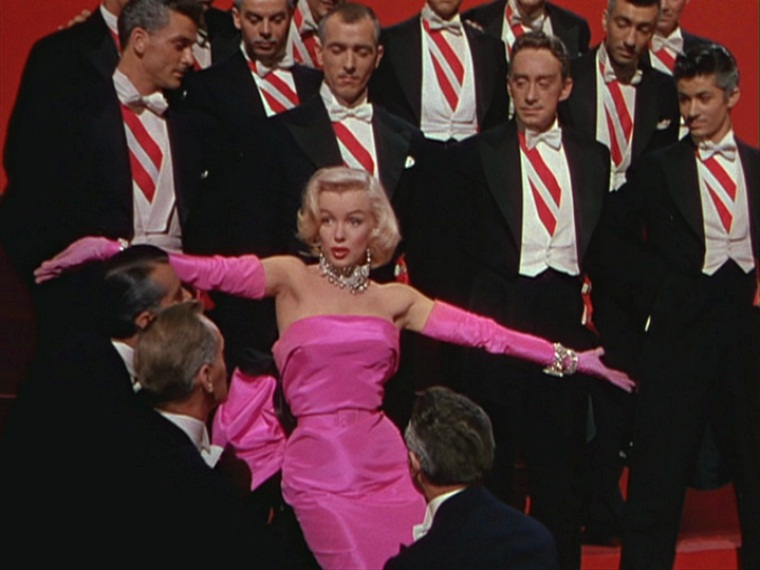
Marilyn Monroe performing "Diamonds Are a Girl's Best Friend" in Gentlemen Prefer Blondes (1953). George Chakiris is on the right (uncredited).

Chakiris made his film debut at age 15 in 1947 in the chorus of Song of Love.

For several years he appeared in small roles, usually as a dancer or a member of the chorus in various musical films, including The Great Caruso (1951), Stars and Stripes Forever (1952), Call Me Madam (1953), Second Chance (1953), and The 5,000 Fingers of Dr. T. (1953). He was a dancer in Marilyn Monroe's "Diamonds Are a Girl's Best Friend" number in Gentlemen Prefer Blondes (1953), and he appeared in Give a Girl a Break (1953) and White Christmas (1954).

He can be seen in the wedding dance in the MGM musical film Brigadoon (1954), and appeared in There's No Business Like Show Business (1954).

=== Paramount ===
Chakiris appeared uncredited as a dancer in White Christmas (1954), and his big break came when he appeared in a close-up with Rosemary Clooney while she sang "Love, You Didn't Do Right by Me". A publicity photo of this generated a great deal of fan mail, and Paramount signed him to a movie contract. "I got lucky with the close-up with Rosemary," said Chakiris.

Chakiris appeared in The Country Girl (1954) and The Girl Rush (1955), dancing with Rosalind Russell in the latter. He received a positive review from Hedda Hopper.

MGM borrowed him for Meet Me in Las Vegas (1956), and he danced in Las Vegas.

Chakiris had a small non-dancing part in Under Fire (1957).

=== West Side Story ===
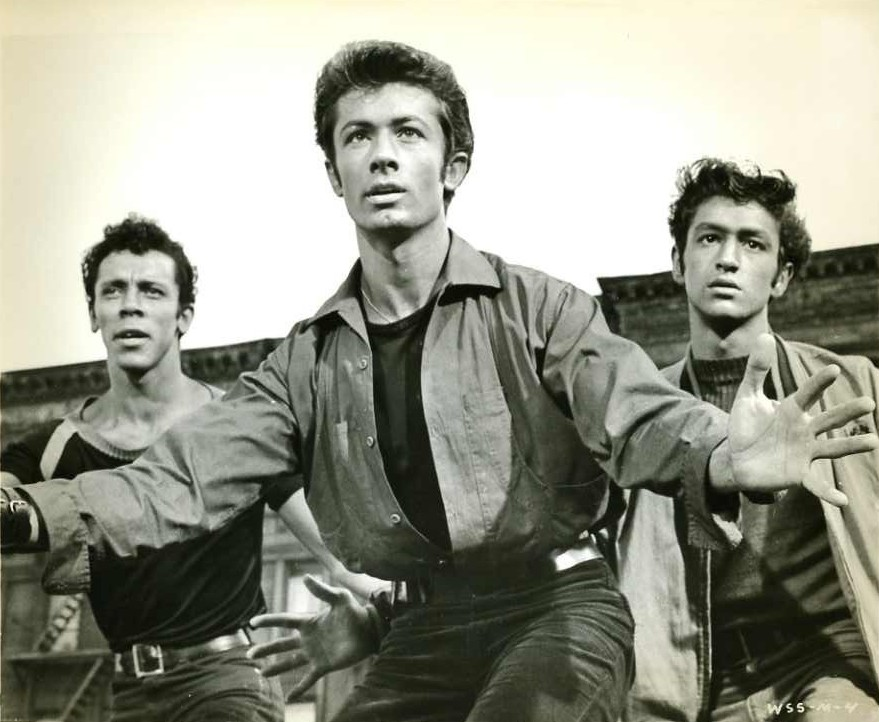
Chakiris in West Side Story (1961)

About 1958, frustrated with the progress of his career, Chakiris left Hollywood for New York. The stage musical West Side Story had been running for a year on Broadway, and Chakiris auditioned for Jerome Robbins. He was cast in the London production as Riff, leader of the Jets. The musical launched on the West End in late 1958, and Chakiris received excellent reviews, playing it for almost 22 months.

The Mirisch Brothers bought the film rights to West Side Story and screen-tested Chakiris. They thought his dark complexion made him more suited to the role of Bernardo, leader of the Sharks, and cast Russ Tamblyn as Riff. Filming took seven months.

The film adaptation of West Side Story (1961) was hugely successful, and Chakiris won the Academy Award for Best Supporting Actor for his performance. This led to a long-term contract with the Mirisch Company.

=== After West Side Story ===
Chakiris played the lead role in Two and Two Make Six (1962), directed by Freddie Francis. He starred as a doctor in the film Diamond Head (1963), opposite Charlton Heston and Yvette Mimieux.

In the early 1960s, he embarked on a career as a pop singer, resulting in a couple of minor hits. In 1960, he recorded a single with producer Joe Meek. He would have two charting albums, George-Chakiris and Memories Are Made of This, they would peak at No. 28 and 45 in the US respectively.

In May 1962 Chakiris's fee was reported to be $100,000 per movie. His first new film for the Mirisches was Flight from Ashiya (1964), shot in Japan with Yul Brynner and Richard Widmark. The Mirisches reunited Chakiris with Brynner in Kings of the Sun (1963), an epic about the Mayans, which was a box-office flop. Chakiris went to Italy to make Bebo's Girl (1964) with Claudia Cardinale. He acted in 633 Squadron (1964), a war movie with Cliff Robertson, the last movie he made for the Mirisches. Chakiris later said he made a mistake with his Hollywood films by looking at the "potential" of them instead of the quality of the roles.

=== Europe ===
Chakiris played a Greek terrorist in Cyprus in a British film, The High Bright Sun (1965), with Dirk Bogarde. He next appeared in several French productions: he co-starred with Brigitte Bardot in The Mona Lisa Has Been Stolen (1965), was part of the ensemble cast of Is Paris Burning? (1966) and co-starred with Catherine Deneuve, Françoise Dorléac and Gene Kelly in Jacques Demy's musical film The Young Girls of Rochefort (1967). Around this time, his manager cancelled his contract with Capitol Records.

However, Chakiris enjoyed his time in Europe, saying he had time to "experiment and refine [his] craft." He also performed a nightclub act at Caesars Palace in Las Vegas, his first stage work since West Side Story. The show was successful and led to Chakiris receiving an offer to appear with Jose Ferrer in a TV production of Kismet (1967). He appeared in The Day the Hot Line Got Hot (1968) in France, and The Big Cube (1969) with Lana Turner in America. He made Sharon Vestida de Rojo (Sharon Dressed in Red) (1970) in Spain.

Filmink argued Chakiris "probably spent too much time in Europe. He definitely should have done more musicals – it’s amazing that he became famous in one but didn’t do any apart from Rochefort."

=== 1970s and 1980s ===
In 1969, Chakiris did a stage production of The Corn Is Green in Chicago with Eileen Herlie. He enjoyed the experience and it revived his confidence as an actor. He said all the films he made after West Side Story had been "a waste of time...it was difficult to take them seriously...It was my fault and no one else's."

Chakiris accepted a dramatic role on TV's Medical Center to change his image.

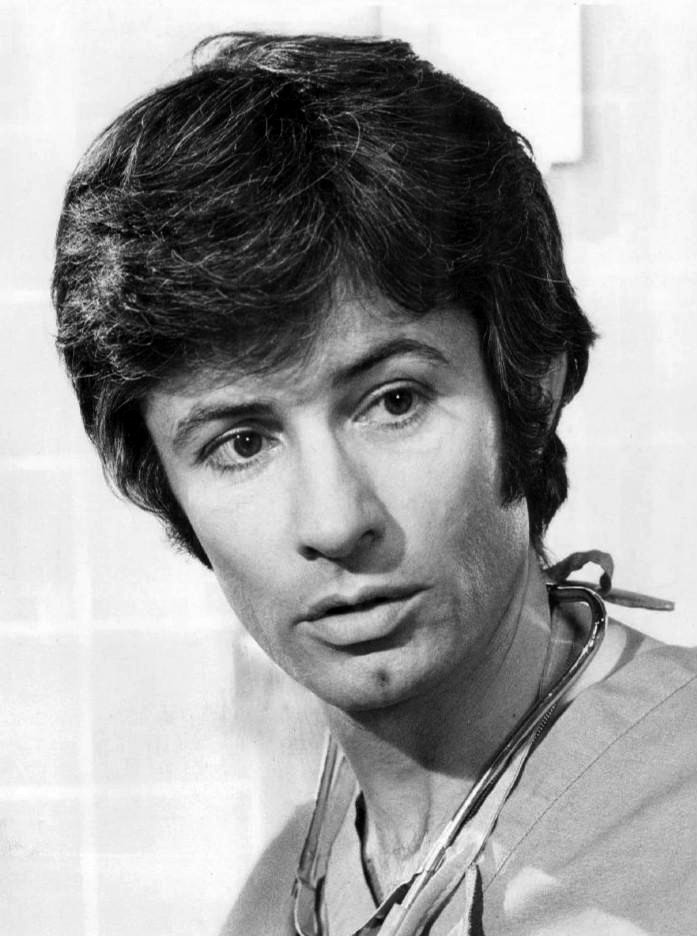
Chakiris as Alex Solkin in Medical Center, 1970

He starred in the first national tour of the Stephen Sondheim musical Company, in the role of Bobby, from 1971-1972.

Chakiris worked heavily on TV in the 1970s and 1980s in Britain and the U.S., guest-starring on Hawaii Five-O, Police Surgeon, Thriller, Notorious Woman, Wonder Woman, Fantasy Island, CHiPs, Matt Houston, Scarecrow and Mrs. King, Poor Little Rich Girls, Hell Town and Murder, She Wrote.

He appeared in the final episode (March 22, 1974) of The Partridge Family as an old high school boyfriend to Shirley Partridge (Shirley Jones). Their kiss goodbye was the final scene in the program's run. He also starred in the Terry Marcel film Why Not Stay for Breakfast? (1979).

Chakiris appeared in several episodes of Dallas and had a role on Santa Barbara.

=== Later career ===
Chakiris was top-billed in the vampire film Pale Blood (1990). On TV, he had a recurring role on the series Superboy as Professor Peterson from 1988 to 1990, and guest-starred on Human Target and the miniseries The Girls of Lido.

On stage, he starred in a Long Beach Civic Light Opera production of The King and I in 1995.

In 1992 Chakiris toured the UK in David Henry Wang's stage drama M Butterfly, loosely based on the real-life controversial - and alleged 'honey trap' - relationship between French diplomatic Bernard Boursicot and male Chinese opera singer Shi Pei Pu, which resulted in a trial in 1986. Chakiris later was said to have viewed it as his most fulfilling role since West Side Story.

On March 23, 1998, on the 70th Academy Awards telecast, he appeared in the "Oscar's Family Album" segment, a historic gathering of 70 actors who have received both competitive and honorary awards seated onstage together.

He has given occasional television interviews since then, but is mostly retired. His hobby of making sterling silver jewelry has turned into a new occupation, working as a jewelry designer for his own brand, George Chakiris Collections, consisting of handmade original sterling silver jewelry.

In 2012, he presented a musical about veganism titled Loving the Silent Tears.

In 2021, Chakiris appeared in the film Not to Forget (2021), which aims to raise awareness and funds for the fight against Alzheimer's disease. The movie, directed by Valerio Zanoli, stars Karen Grassle and five Academy Award winners: George Chakiris, Cloris Leachman, Louis Gossett Jr., Tatum O'Neal, and Olympia Dukakis.

== Filmography ==
Year	Title	Role	Notes
1947	Song of Love	Choir boy	As George Kerris
1951	The Great Caruso	Dancer	Uncredited
1952	Stars and Stripes Forever	Ballroom dancer	Uncredited
1953	Call Me Madam	Dancer in 'The Ocarina' Number	
1953	The 5,000 Fingers of Dr. T.	Dancer	As George Kerris
1953	Gentlemen Prefer Blondes	Dancer ("Diamonds Are A Girl's Best Friend")	Uncredited
1953	Second Chance	Background Observer in Dance Sequence	Uncredited
1953	Give a Girl a Break	Dancer	Uncredited
1954	Brigadoon	Specialty dancer	Uncredited
1954	White Christmas	Dancer in 'Mandy' and 'Love' numbers	Uncredited
1954	The Country Girl	Dancer with pick	Uncredited
1954	There's No Business Like Show Business	Dancer	Uncredited
1955	The Girl Rush	Chorus boy, 'Hillbilly Heart' number	Uncredited
1956	Meet Me in Las Vegas	Young groom	As George Kerris
1957	Under Fire	Pvt. Steiner	Uncredited
1961	West Side Story	Bernardo	Academy Award for Best Supporting Actor; Golden Globe Award for Best Supporting Actor – Motion Picture
1962	Two and Two Make Six	Larry Curado	
1962	Diamond Head	Dr. Dean Kahanna	
1963	Kings of the Sun	Balam	
1964	La ragazza di Bube	Bebo	English: Bebo's Girl
1964	Flight from Ashiya	2nd Lt. John Gregg	
1964	633 Squadron	Lt. Erik Bergman	
1965	The High Bright Sun	Haghios	
1966	On a volé la Joconde	Vincent	English: The Mona Lisa Has Been Stolen
1966	Is Paris Burning?	GI in tank	
1967	Les Demoiselles de Rochefort	Étienne	English: The Young Girls of Rochefort
1968	Le Rouble à Deux Faces	Eric Ericson	US title: The Day the Hot Line Got Hot
1969	The Big Cube	Johnny Allen	
1969	Sharon Vestida de Rojo	Robert Bowman	English: Sharon Dressed in Red
1979	Why Not Stay for Breakfast?	George Clark	
1982	Jekyll and Hyde... Together Again	Himself	
1990	Pale Blood	Michael Fury	
2021	Rita Moreno: Just a Girl Who Decided to Go for It	Himself	Documentary about Rita Moreno, his costar in West Side Story (1961)
2021	Not to Forget	Bank Manager	
2025	George Chakiris - Dancing to Success	Himself	Short

== Selected television appearances ==
Year	Title	Role	Notes
1956	Ford Star Jubilee		Episode: "You're the Top"
1962-1968	The Ed Sullivan Show	Bernardo/Singer	2 episodes
1968	The Carol Burnett Show		Episode 18 (January 22, 1968)
1969	The Jackie Gleason Show	Mousey the Dip	Episode: "Mousey the Dip"
1970–1975	Medical Center	Alex Solkin	3 episodes
1972	Hawaii Five-O	Chris Lahani	Episode: "Death Is a Company Policy"
1974	The Partridge Family	Capt. Chuck "Cuddles" Corwin	Episode: ". . . - - - . . . (S.O.S.)"
1974	Thriller	Robert Stone	Episode: "Kiss Me and Die"
1974	Notorious Woman	Frédéric Chopin	4 episodes
1978	The New Adventures of Wonder Woman	Carlo Indrezzano	Episode: "Death in Disguise"
1978-1982	Fantasy Island	Pierre/Captain Claude Dumont	2 episodes
1983	CHiPs	Bernard DeJardine	Episode: "Fox Trap"
1983-1984	Matt Houston	Brett Cole/Clark Sawyer	2 episodes
1984	One Life to Live		Unknown episodes
1984	Poor Little Rich Girls	Prince Rudolph	Episode: "The Gentleman Caller"
1984	Nihon no omokage	Lafcadio Hearn	Japanese miniseries ja:日本の面影
1984	Scarecrow and Mrs. King	Angelo Spinelli	Episode: "Lost and Found"
1985	Hell Town	Ric Montenez	Episode: "Let My Jennie Go"
1985-1986	Dallas	Nicholas	14 episodes
1988	Santa Barbara	Daniel Espinoza	3 episodes
1989	Murder, She Wrote	Eric Bowman	Episode: "Weave a Tangled Web"
1989–1990	Superboy	Professor Peterson	9 episodes
1992	Human Target	Robillard	Episode: "Chances Are"
1995	The Girls of Lido	Saskia	French Miniseries
1996	Last of the Summer Wine	Max Bernard	Episode: "Extra! Extra!"
