= Not to Forget =

2021 American drama film

- Directed by: Valerio Zanoli
- Written by: Valerio Zanoli
- Produced by: Valerio Zanoli
- Starring: Karen Grassle; Tate Dewey; Kevin Hardesty; Louis Gossett Jr. Tatum O'Neal; George Chakiris; Cloris Leachman; Olympia Dukakis
- Cinematography: Massimo Zeri
- Music by: Marco Del Bene
- Distributed by: Vertical Entertainment
- Release date: November 26, 2021
- Running time: 84 minutes
- Country: United States
- Language: English

Not to Forget is a 2021 American drama film written and directed by Valerio Zanoli and starring Karen Grassle, Tate Dewey, Kevin Hardesty, Louis Gossett Jr., Tatum O'Neal, George Chakiris, Cloris Leachman and Olympia Dukakis, the latter two in their final film appearances.

== Plot ==
A scamming self-centered millennial is forced to take care of his grandmother, who has Alzheimer's.

== Cast ==
- Karen Grassle as Melody
- Tate Dewey as Chris
- Kevin Hardesty as Joe
- Louis Gossett Jr. as Pastor John Robinson
- Eben French Mastin as George
- Taylor Hook as Kim
- Jared Egusa as Jerry
- Olympia Dukakis as Judge
- Tatum O'Neal as Doctor
- Cloris Leachman as Donna
- George Chakiris as Bank Manager
- Clark Davis as District Attorney
- Susan Dudley as Hairdresser
- Jessa Deluca as Hospital Worker
- Pedro Lucero as Security Guard
- Daniel Hall Kuhn as Hospital Guard

== Release ==
The film was released in theaters on November 26, 2021.

== Reception ==
On the review aggregator website Rotten Tomatoes, 55% of 11 critics' reviews are positive, with an average rating of 6.5/10.

Bob Bloom of the Journal & Courier awarded the film two and a half stars out of four and wrote, "Not to Forget follows a familiar path as it intermingles its faith-based message with a look at the ravages and emotional toll of Alzheimer's disease."

Tara McNamara of Common Sense Media awarded the film two stars out of five.

Alan Ng of Film Threat rated the film a 7 out of 10 and wrote, "With the proper expectations set, Not to Forget delivers on its promise of light family drama."
