= Nickelodeon (film) =

1976 film by Peter Bogdanovich

- Theatrical release poster
- Directed by: Peter Bogdanovich
- Written by: Peter Bogdanovich; W.D. Richter
- Produced by: Robert Chartoff; Frank Marshall; Irwin Winkler
- Starring: Ryan O'Neal; Burt Reynolds; Tatum O'Neal; Brian Keith; Stella Stevens; John Ritter
- Cinematography: László Kovács
- Edited by: William C. Carruth
- Music by: Richard Hazard
- Production companies: Columbia Pictures; British Lion Films; EMI Films; Chartoff-Winkler Productions
- Distributed by: Columbia Pictures (United States); EMI Distribution (United Kingdom)
- Release date: December 21, 1976
- Running time: 122 minutes 125 minutes (director's cut)
- Countries: United States; United Kingdom
- Language: English
- Budget: $8 million

Nickelodeon is a 1976 comedy film directed by Peter Bogdanovich, and stars Ryan O'Neal, Burt Reynolds and Tatum O'Neal. According to Bogdanovich, the film was based on true stories told to him by silent film directors Allan Dwan and Raoul Walsh. It was entered into the 27th Berlin International Film Festival.

== Plot ==
In 1914, Leo Harrigan goes from being a lawyer to a writer and then to a film director while having problems, such as being hopelessly smitten with Kathleen Cooke.

While directing a scene of his friend Buck rising in a balloon, Kathleen gets trapped in a rope and is hoisted in a most undignified manner. They keep filming, including the balloon crashing onto a moving train. As the footage is excellent, they incorporate it into the film and rewrite the story to fit. Kathleen therefore accidentally becomes the leading lady.

Due to Kathleen's life being saved by Buck in the balloon, they are now engaged. After shooting a scene where they get married, they drive off to really wed.

When they go to a small town nickelodeon, they are surprised to see a film Tuttle's Muddle which is a spliced version of the ten films which they have made to date. Their attitude changes when the audience follow them, recognising them as the stars of the film. The group are offered a contract by Atlantic Pictures who are relocating to the Pacific and they all head to Hollywood.

Leo moves from New Jersey to California to keep one step ahead of the Motion Picture Patents Company, which is out to destroy any non-authorized equipment violating the Edison Trust. Leo finally settles in with other filmmakers in Hollywoodland, California, and makes a series of dramatic, romantic, and comedic shorts as throwaways.

While initially believing movies are just a brief flickering kind of entertainment, Leo and the crew are profoundly affected when they go to see the 1915 world premiere of D. W. Griffith's The Birth of a Nation, which transforms the motion picture industry. The film gets a standing ovation and Leo is left feeling inadequate. After the film, they re-encounter Cobb who speaks to camera enthusing about what the cinema can bring. He wants Leo to make a film about the war, getting "what war?" in response.

== Cast ==
- Ryan O'Neal as Leo Harrigan
- Burt Reynolds as Buck Greenway
- Tatum O'Neal as Alice Forsyte
- Jane Hitchcock as Kathleen Cooke
- Brian Keith as H.H. Cobb
- Stella Stevens as Marty Reeves
- John Ritter as Franklin Frank
- Brion James as Bailiff
- Sidney Armus as Judge
- Joe Warfield as Defence Attorney
- Lorenzo Music as Mullins
- Jeffrey Byron as Steve
- Priscilla Pointer as Mabel
- Philip Bruns as Duncan
- Frank Marshall as Dinsdale's Assistant
- Harry Carey, Jr. as Dobie
- James Best as Jim
- George Gaynes as Reginald Kingsley
- M. Emmet Walsh as 'Father' Logan
- Miriam Byrd-Nethery as Aunt Lula
- Les Josephson as Nickelodeon Bouncer
- Griffin O'Neal as Boy On A Bicycle
- Hamilton Camp as Blacker
- Elaine Partnow as Movie Fanatic

== Production ==
=== Screenplay ===
In his memoirs, Irwin Winkler says he wanted to make a movie about the silent film era. He took the idea to W.D. Richter, with whom he had worked a number of times, and Richter agreed to write the project on "spec" for the producers (Winkler's producing partner was Bob Chartoff). Richter's final script was called Starlight Parade, and attracted interest from United Artists and Columbia. David Begelman at Columbia suggested Peter Bogdanovich as director.

Winkler later stated:

He made David come to his office and wait until the receptionist said: 'Mr. Bogdanovich will see you now.' As soon as we came inside, we were very haughtily told that he thought the script was a piece of [garbage]. I'd been around long enough to know that I should take that as a bad sign. I remember coming out of the meeting, saying, 'David, why should we make the movie with someone who hates our script?' And all David said was, 'Hey, he's a genius.' ... What he filmed had nothing to do with the original script. I know it meant a lot to Peter to have all of the authentic stories about the silent period in the film, but Rick's script, authentic or not, was terrific. It was just a great drama. By the time Peter was done with it, it was authentic, but it wasn't dramatic anymore. Peter hadn't really experienced any failure yet — we hired him before At Long Last Love had come out - so he was easily the most arrogant person I'd ever met in the business, before or since. When we shot the picture, he actually directed some of the scenes on horseback. When I asked him why he was on horseback, he said: "Because that's the way John Ford did it"'.

Bogdanovich has an alternative version:

I should have never gotten involved, I should have done it myself. I'd been planning to do a big picture about the silent era, largely based on the interviews with Dwan, Walsh and McCarey. I was preparing it and I got a call from my agent and she said they're preparing a movie called Starlight Parade, there's another director involved but they want you. I said, "Well, I don't really want to do their script, I'll have to rewrite it completely". "They'll let you rewrite it, whatever you want." Basically I rewrote the whole damn thing and never used any of Starlight Parade. The trouble was, again, the picture had a balance between comedy and drama and it was a comedy-drama, no question about it, and I had wanted to do it in black and white. It was very important to do it in black and white and Columbia, the studio, wouldn't let me. I had a big fight about that and they cancelled the picture. Then Barry Spikings at British-Lion came in and funded some of the picture, threw in a few million dollars. It ended up being a Columbia-British Lion picture and but when it was all done it was a difficult picture.

The movie's title was eventually changed to Nickelodeon.

=== Casting ===
Bogdanovich said his original choices for the leads were Jeff Bridges, John Ritter, Cybill Shepherd and Orson Welles. However, Columbia Pictures head David Begelman refused and Burt Reynolds and Ryan O'Neal were cast in the leads. He also refused to let Bogdanovich's then-girlfriend Shepherd in the female lead out of fear of a public backlash against her, following the poor box office performance of Daisy Miller and At Long Last Love. Shepherd's friend, model Jane Hitchcock, was cast on her recommendation. Brian Keith played the part Bogdanovich wanted Welles to play. (He later said he was going to play it at one stage).) Of Bogdanovich's original picks for the leads, only Ritter was cast, in a smaller role, as cameraman Franklin Frank, in what would be the first of three collaborations between him and Bogdanovich (the other two being 1981's They All Laughed and 1992's Noises Off.)

"The character I play ... is a sort of a Gary Cooper with a little Buster Keaton thrown in", said Reynolds. "I do a lot of pratfalls and fall into things. He's a very shy, sweet, and likeable character. This is a first for me. The part that I would normally play is being played by Ryan O'Neal. He's a fast talking guy trying to become a big success. Peter wrote the film for Ryan O'Neal and me; he sees me [in real life] as that shy guy".

Tatum O'Neal, who had won an Oscar appearing in Bogdanovich's Paper Moon alongside her father, joined the supporting cast.

The fees for Reynolds and O'Neal were around $750,000, and Tatum O'Neal was $350,000. This caused the budget to increase and Columbia cancelled the film.

"This film is not over and done with", said Richter in November 1975. "What it comes down to is a power struggle over the budget. Columbia wants an enormous hunk cut out of it and I think if we can cut if they will make the film. By its very nature it is an expensive project. Why the studio brought this to is another question. Maybe it is the beginning of an attempt to start cutting back stars' prices. I think it is criminal to have to shorten the film just to pay a kings ransom to stars. You end up in debt before you begin".

Extra finance was obtained by British Lion and it was announced that filming would proceed. "We have worked out 99% of the problems and expect to work out 100% of the creative differences", said David Begelman in December 1975.

Columbia provided $6 million, British Lion $2 million. The director's fee was $700,000, $500,000 of which was held as a completion guarantee. (The movie would later transfer from British Lion to EMI).)

Bogdanovich later said the film "didn't have to cost half as much as it did. The producers insisted it be bigger and I fought but I finally had to accept what they wanted".

=== Shooting ===
"The whole idea was to capture the era, since obviously the original films were shot in black and white", Bogdanovich says. "My cinematographer, Laszlo Kovacs, carefully lit everything to accommodate black-and-white, which is why the lighting looks so good. We used a lot of the techniques of the silent era, irising in and out of scenes. There are no opticals at all in the film. But all the studio wanted was another broad comedy like What's Up, Doc?"

During filming, Burt Reynolds collapsed on set one day. Doctors could not figure out what was wrong with him and the film had to be postponed for two weeks while he recovered. The film went over schedule and over budget and Bogdanovich had to forfeit his $500,000.

"I just had a smaller picture in mind", said the director later. "Both Burt Reynolds and Ryan were good in it, and Jane Hitchcock was good but she didn't have any threat about her".

Ryan O'Neal had made two pictures previously with Bogdanovich but said Nickelodeon was a "terrible experience" and that Bogdanovich "began no longer using writers ... Orson Welles quit one week before he was to appear in the film ... Bogdanovich rewrote what originally was a tough little script about Hollywood into a farcical series of precious little jokes. I tried to get out of the picture. I told him, 'Peter we had a good script but you changed it. You're locked up there in your house. You've got to get out and regain the gritty edge you showed in Last Picture Show. But he never did".

Reynolds and his stunt man Hal Needham had an unhappy experience making the film. They later made the film Hooper which featured a pretentious film director based on Bogdanovich.

=== Post-production ===
Winkler says when he saw a rough cut of the final film he thought it was "atrocious ... for Peter to blame the movie's failure on the casting and not being in black-and-white is a really terrible excuse for a guy who simply screwed up a really terrific script."

== Reception ==
For the Los Angeles premiere, all guests (and some critics) paid five cents (a nickel five-cent coin) to see the movie in honor of the film and early Hollywood ticket prices. However, the movie was unsuccessful at the box office, and was Bogdanovich's third flop in a row, after Daisy Miller and At Long Last Love (the latter of which was also an attempt to revive an older style of film making).

Bogdanovich reminisced in 2004:

The previews were edgy and the studio wanted me to take most of the drama out, play it more comedy and turn it more into a What's Up Doc?, which it really wasn't. So that threw it off and it got fucked up. Again, the picture came out not at all the way I wanted. I tried to recut that one and I couldn't get back to it. There's about five minutes I'd like to put back that really makes a difference, some heavy stuff where you find out that Ryan O'Neal has an affair with Stella Stevens, it becomes very clear, and you see that John Ritter knows it, all that stuff. It was just much heavier and darker. So the picture got screwed up and that's why I took three years off and went away.

Bogdanovich blamed the studio for poor marketing.

I couldn't seem to get anything across to them. I felt like I was talking into a void. When you've had a few successes you can say the stupidest things in the world and people will think it's clever. When you've had a few flops, you can say something perfectly reasonable and they look at you as if they had no idea what you are talking about.

As for Richter;

After it became clear the picture was a failure, the most amazing thing happened: I got more job offers than ever before in my life. People seemed so mad at Peter that they were eager to make excuses for me and help me out. And they all wanted to hear about working with him.

After making the film, Bogdanovich felt he had compromised so much he took three years off directing, before returning with Saint Jack (1979).

Among contemporary reviews from critics, Roger Ebert gave the film two stars out of four and called it "a curiously flat movie. It functions like clockwork and it looks right, but it doesn't feel like much. The laughs are telegraphed, the actors are lifeless (with the exception of Burt Reynolds), and the movie does an abrupt turnabout, from comedy to elegy, about two-thirds of the way through". Richard Eder of The New York Times called the film "two hours and two minutes of impersonations. Some of them are very good impersonations—deft and funny—but they lack a life to string them together". Arthur D. Murphy of Variety called it "an okay comedy-drama about the early days of motion pictures. Recreating a cultural era in terms of some of its artistic forms and cliches emerges as an uneven dramatic device though it sometimes works". Gene Siskel of the Chicago Tribune gave the film two stars out of four and wrote that it "really bogs down with incessantly inept pratfall comedy" and "is successful only when it captures the innocence of the period".

Kevin Thomas of the Los Angeles Times wrote: "In the first part of the film O'Neal, Reynolds and Miss Hitchcock often seem merely silly as they carry on like the exaggerated characters in their own movies. Alas, the effect is to make the latter portion of the movie unduly static and drawn out in comparison to its frenetic beginning. However, the more aware one is of what Bogdanovich is trying to do and the more knowledgeable one is about the era he is trying to evoke, the more enjoyable the movie. Indeed, Nickelodeon is most affecting for the cineaste, and its culminating tribute to D. W. Griffith as the screen's first great artist brings tears to the eyes."

Gary Arnold of The Washington Post wrote that, while Bogdanovich's new film was not quite a disaster on par with his previous flop At Long Last Love, "this elaborate, rambling and ultimately tedious period comedy about the pioneering years of the movie business in Hollywood does not lack for crippling deficiencies, miscalculations and self-indulgences".

Critic John Simon called the film "a sanity test: anyone who catches himself laughing at any of it at this late date should seriously consider committing himself to the nearest mental hospital even though in his case a cure is hardly to be hoped for".

Filmink magazine argued that "even different casting would have fixed other issues with the film… it’s overlong running time, the fact that it spans years, all the endless zappy talk that isn’t particularly witty (a hallmark of Bogdanovich written dialogue), characters falling in love at the drop of a hat (ditto)".

As of December 2025, the film holds a rating of 14% on the review aggregator Rotten Tomatoes based on 14 reviews, with an average rating of 5.2/10.

== Alternative versions ==
The 2009 DVD release includes a 125-minute "Director's Cut" in black and white. "There's nothing to distract you", said Bogdanovich, "Ryan's blond hair and blue eyes don't distract you, and you focus on the action in an easier way. That's why the funniest movies ever made were silent comedies—Buster Keaton, Harold Lloyd, Charlie Chaplin. It focuses the attention in a different way, and color is distracting for that sort of thing".
