= Karen Grassle =

American actress (born 1942)

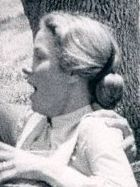
- Karen Grassle in Little House on the Prairie
- Born: February 25, 1942 (age 84); Berkeley, California, U.S.
- Education: University of California, Berkeley (BA); London Academy of Music and Dramatic Art
- Occupations: Actress; author
- Years active: 1966–present
- Known for: Little House on the Prairie; Cymbeline; Harry's War; Wyatt Earp; Not to Forget

Karen Grassle (/ɡræsli/ GRASS-lee; born February 25, 1942) is an American actress, known for her role as Caroline Ingalls in the NBC television drama series Little House on the Prairie.

== Early life ==
Karen Grassle was born in northern California and moved to Ventura with her family when she was 5 years old. As a child, she studied at a dance academy and acted in school plays. She graduated from Ventura High School in 1959. She attended H. Sophie Newcomb Memorial College (Tulane University, 1959–60) and then transferred to the University of California, Berkeley. She graduated with BA degrees in 1965 in English and in Dramatic Art. She received a Fulbright Fellowship to the London Academy of Music and Dramatic Art in London.

== Career ==
After summers at the Stanford Contemporary Workshop playing leads and two summers at the Colorado Shakespeare Festival playing classical roles, her first professional engagement was a season at the Front Street Theatre, Memphis, Tennessee upon return from London. While living in New York City, she worked at resident and stock theatres throughout the country, also appearing on PBS in original works and on networks in three soap operas. She made her Broadway debut in the short-lived 1968 play The Gingham Dog. Grassle played in Butterflies Are Free on Broadway (as stand-by with Gloria Swanson, Rosemary Murphy, etc.) as well as at the Elitch Theatre in Denver, Colorado, in June 1972, along with Maureen O'Sullivan and Brandon deWilde, who was killed before leaving town after the performances ended. Grassle starred in the Shakespeare in the Park production of Cymbeline with Christopher Walken, Sam Waterston, and William Devane.

Grassle auditioned for the role of the mother, Caroline Ingalls, in the Little House on the Prairie TV series and won the part. The series ran for nine seasons, from 1974 to 1983. After making the pilot for Little House on the Prairie, Grassle appeared in one episode of Gunsmoke titled "The Wiving" as Fran, one of several saloon girls kidnapped. Subsequently, she acted in the features Harry's War, a 1981 American film where she played Kathy, the wife of Edward Herrmann's title character, and Wyatt Earp, a 1994 film starring Kevin Costner. On television, she starred in and co-wrote the NBC-TV film Battered. Other TV movies include Cocaine: One Man's Seduction, Crisis in MidAir, and Between the Darkness and the Dawn. In episodic TV, she starred in Hotel, Love Boat, and Murder She Wrote (twice). She also appeared on Hollywood Squares and numerous talk shows such as Dinah, Merv Griffin, Mike Douglas, and John Davidson. During this period, she lobbied for federal funding for shelters for battered women and appeared in many events to support the Equal Rights Amendment. (Performance of the Year award.)

After the series ended, she moved to Santa Fe, New Mexico, and became co-founder and artistic director of Santa Fe's Resource Theater Company. Later she moved to Louisville, Kentucky, where she performed with the company of actors at Actors Theatre of Louisville.

Settling in the San Francisco Bay Area in 2006, Grassle appeared in plays at San Francisco Playhouse, "The Ride Down Mt. Morgan;" "Cabaret." (Outstanding Achievement Award, 2008;) TheatreWorks; Aurora Theatre and out of town in five productions of "Driving Miss Daisy" at Manitoba Theatre Center, etc. Independent films "Lasso" (2017), "Not to Forget" (2019). Grassle continues to perform in productions in San Francisco, Berkeley, and Palo Alto as well as tours and productions such as Driving Miss Daisy in the starring role of Miss Daisy at the Manitoba Theatre Centre in Winnipeg, Manitoba, Canada, in a co-production with Rubicon Theatre and at the Riverside Center for the Performing Arts in Fredericksburg, Virginia. In 2008, she was awarded a prize for her performance in Cabaret at the San Francisco Playhouse. Over the years, she has appeared in commercials such as the promotional face for Premier Bathrooms, a supplier of bathing products for the elderly and infirm.

In 2021, Grassle starred in the film Not to Forget (2021) together with Academy Award winners Cloris Leachman, Louis Gossett Jr., Tatum O'Neal, George Chakiris and Olympia Dukakis. The film, directed by Valerio Zanoli, aimed to raise awareness and funds for the fight against Alzheimer's disease.

== Personal life ==
Grassle's memoir Bright Lights, Prairie Dust: Reflections on Life, Loss, and Love from Little House's Ma was published November 16, 2021 by She Writes Press. At the date of publication Grassle resided in the San Francisco Bay Area with her son Zach Radford.

The book detailed her struggles with alcoholism, as well as the troubled relationship she had with her former co-star, Michael Landon. Grassle accused Landon of making derogatory remarks about her while on the set of Little House, often with other members of the cast and crew present and laughing at the comments. Grassle also claimed that her relationship with Landon became strained after she sought a raise, which he refused to give her.

Grassle subsequently "mended fences" with Landon prior to his death in 1991 from pancreatic cancer.

== Filmography ==
Film and television roles
Year	Title	Role	Notes
1974–82	Little House on the Prairie	Caroline Ingalls	182 episodes
1974	Gunsmoke	Fran	Episode: "The Wiving"
1977	Emily, Emily	Terry	TV film
1978	The President's Mistress	Donna Morton	TV film
1978	Battered	Susannah Hawks	Also writer
1979	Crisis in Mid-air	Betsy Culver	TV film
1979	The Little House Years	Caroline Ingalls	TV special of Little House on the Prairie
1981	Harry's War	Kathy	Feature film
1981	The Love Boat	Paula	Episode: "Maid for Each Other/Lost and Found/Then There Were Two"
1983	Cocaine: One Man's Seduction	Barbara Gant	TV film
1983	Hotel	Susan Walker	Episode: "Christmas"
1984	Little House: The Last Farewell	Caroline Ingalls	TV film
1985	Between the Darkness and the Dawn	Ellen Foster Holland	TV film
1987	Murder, She Wrote	Christine Stoneham	Episode: "Murder in a Minor Key"
1988	Murder, She Wrote	Fay Hewitt	Episode: "Harbinger of Death"
1994	Wyatt Earp	Mrs. Sutherland	Feature film
2012	Tales of Everyday Magic	Aunt Dorothy	Feature film
2012	My Greatest Teacher	Aunt Dorothy	Feature film
2017	Lasso	Lillian	Feature film
2017	Where's Roman?	Mysterious Woman	Short film
2021	Not to Forget	Melody	Feature film

== Awards and nominations ==
Year	Award	Category	Work	Result	Ref.
1975	Western Heritage Awards	Fictional Television Drama	Little House on the Prairie	Won	
1976	TP de Oro, Spain	Best Foreign Actress (Mejor Actriz Extranjera)	Little House on the Prairie	Nominated	
1977	TP de Oro, Spain	Best Foreign Actress (Mejor Actriz Extranjera)	Little House on the Prairie	Won	

== Book ==
- Grassle, Karen (2021). Bright Lights, Prairie Dust: Reflections on Life, Loss, and Love from Little House's Ma. She Writes Press. ISBN 978-1-647-42313-1.
