= Joanna Moore =

American actress (1934–1997)

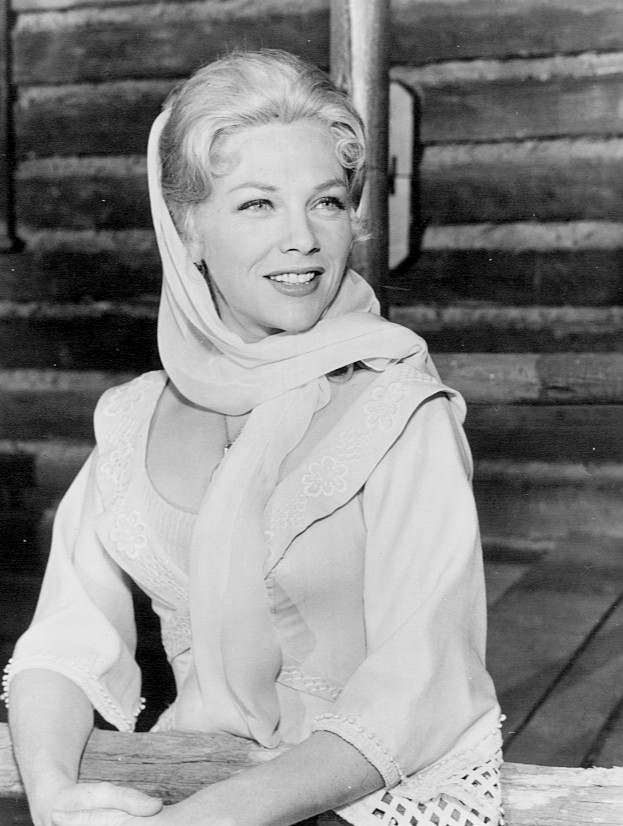
- Moore in 1964
- Born: Dorothy Joanne Cook; November 10, 1934; Americus, Georgia, U.S.
- Died: November 22, 1997 (aged 63); Indian Wells, California, U.S.
- Resting place: Oak Grove Cemetery, Americus, Georgia, U.S.
- Other name: Joanna Cook Moore
- Education: Agnes Scott College
- Occupation: Actress
- Years active: 1957–1986
- Known for: Touch of Evil; Monster on the Campus; Walk on the Wild Side; Ride a Crooked Trail; Follow That Dream
- Spouses: Willis Moore (m. 1951; div. 1952); Don Oreck (m. 1956; div. 1957) Ryan O'Neal (m. 1963; div. 1967) Gary L. Reeves (m. 1975; div. 1977)
- Children: Tatum O'Neal; Griffin O'Neal

Joanna Moore (born Dorothy Joanne Cook; November 10, 1934 – November 22, 1997) was an American film and television actress, who, between 1956 and 1976, appeared in 17 feature films and guest-starred in nearly a hundred television series episodes. After 1976, personal problems derailed her career and she landed only two minor film roles.

From 1963 to 1967, she was married to actor Ryan O'Neal, with whom she had two children, Griffin O'Neal and Tatum O'Neal.

Moore's career hit its peak in the 1960s. During that time, she guest-starred in several popular shows, including Alfred Hitchcock Presents, Perry Mason, The Fugitive, Bewitched and The Real McCoys. One of her recurring roles was as Sheriff Andy Taylor's love interest, Peggy "Peg" McMillan in four episodes of The Andy Griffith Show, from 1962 to 1963. Moore was a guest star in such television Westerns as The Rifleman, Wagon Train (S1E2 & S7E25), Gunsmoke (title character in three episodes: S5E21's "Coleen So Green", S5E39's "Cherry Red" and S10E34's "Honey Pot"), The Rebel, The High Chaparral, The Wild Wild West and The Virginian. By the 1970s, her career began to wane because of her drug and alcohol addictions. Moore made her final onscreen appearance in 1986, and died of lung cancer in 1997.

== Early life ==
Moore was born as Dorothy Joanne Cook in Americus, Georgia. She was the elder of two daughters, born to parents Dorothy Martha (née English) and Henry Anderson Cook III. In 1941, when she was a child, her parents and younger sister were involved in a fatal car accident: her mother and sister died immediately, while her father died from his injuries a year later. Moore was then adopted by Don Carrison, a wealthy local family and changed her name from Dorothy to Joanna.

== Career ==
=== 1950s ===
Moore made her television debut in the November 8, 1956 episode of Lux Video Theatre. The following year, she made her film debut in the 1957 crime drama Appointment with a Shadow. Later that year, she appeared in episodes of Goodyear Theatre and Harbormaster, along with another film, Slim Carter. In 1958, she had a small role in the film noir classic Touch of Evil with Orson Welles, Charlton Heston, Janet Leigh and Marlene Dietrich, followed by more substantial roles in the horror film Monster on the Campus and the Western Ride a Crooked Trail.

From 1958 to 1959, Moore landed guest spots on television, including Westinghouse Studio One, Suspicion, The Rough Riders, Bourbon Street Beat, Bat Masterson, The Real McCoys, Maverick, The Rifleman and Riverboat. She made a guest appearance on Perry Mason as the title character in the 1958 episode "The Case of the Terrified Typist".

=== 1960s ===
During the 1960s, Moore continued her career guest-starring on numerous television shows in addition to film appearances. From 1960 to 1961, she guest-starred on Five Fingers, The Rebel, Hong Kong, The Untouchables, 77 Sunset Strip, Going My Way and Empire.

In 1962, Moore appeared as Miss Precious in Walk on the Wild Side with Jane Fonda, Barbara Stanwyck and Capucine, followed by the musical Follow That Dream with Elvis Presley. That same year, Moore appeared in four episodes of The Andy Griffith Show as Peggy "Peg" McMillan, Sheriff Taylor's love interest, and guest-starred on the Route 66 episode "There I Am – There I Always Am". In 1963, she co-starred in Son of Flubber and was cast in The Man from Galveston, intended as the pilot for Temple Houston. Also that year, she made a second guest appearance on Perry Mason as Grace Olney in "The Case of the Reluctant Model". In 1964, she guest-starred on Bob Hope Presents the Chrysler Theatre.

From 1965 to 1967, Moore guest starred on The Man from U.N.C.L.E., The Rogues, My Three Sons, Peyton Place (starring Moore's then-husband, Ryan O'Neal), Daniel Boone, Cowboy in Africa and Iron Horse. In 1967, Moore appeared as Daphne Harper, a snob and former college beauty queen chum of Darrin's, in the "Charlie Harper, Winner" episode of Bewitched. During the time, Moore also had an uncredited role as Angie, the widow of Jesse Cole, in Nevada Smith starring Steve McQueen.

Throughout the 1950s and 1960s, Moore also made multiple appearances on The Millionaire, The Andy Griffith Show, The United States Steel Hour, Route 66, Wagon Train, Alfred Hitchcock Presents (and The Alfred Hitchcock Hour), Hawaiian Eye, Alcoa Premiere, Gunsmoke, The Fugitive, The Virginian, The High Chaparral and The F.B.I.

=== 1970s and 1980s ===
During the early and mid 1970s, Moore continued with guest roles on Nanny and the Professor, The Governor & J.J. and McCloud. In 1973, she appeared in the television adaptation of the 1954 film Three Coins in the Fountain, also starring Yvonne Craig and Cynthia Pepper. In 1974, she appeared on The Waltons in the episode entitled "The Departure". In 1975, she co-starred in the feature film The Hindenburg. The next year, she guest-starred on Petrocelli and The Blue Knight and made two appearances on Bronk.

By the late 1970s, Moore's career had begun to wane owing to personal problems. Her only two on-screen appearances after 1976 were in a supporting role in the 1980 television film Scout's Honor starring Gary Coleman and a bit part in the 1986 Australian film Run, Chrissie, Run!

== Personal life and health ==
=== Hearing loss ===
In the early 1960s, Moore became deaf as a result of otosclerosis, which her doctor said resulted from a deposit of calcium in her middle ear. Moore said that she had to read lips to understand what people were saying. An operation restored her hearing in 1962.

=== Marriages and children ===
On April 3, 1963, Moore married her third husband, actor Ryan O'Neal. Their children, Tatum and Griffin O'Neal, became child actors. Moore and O'Neal's marriage was tempestuous, and the couple separated in early 1966. In February 1967, their divorce became final. Her daughter, Tatum, who later married tennis champion John McEnroe, became an Academy Award-winning actress at age 10 for her supporting role in Paper Moon, and was one of the highest-paid child stars of the era.

In February 1975, she married roofing contractor Gary L. Reeves.

=== Drug and alcohol addiction ===
In 1970, Moore checked into the Camarillo State Hospital for psychiatric treatment. The next year, she was arrested for drunk driving after getting into a fight while she and her children were visiting O'Neal's Malibu home. After her arrest, she lost custody of her children. Her daughter, Tatum, later revealed that at the time she was being assaulted by Moore's 15-year-old live-in boyfriend.

By the late 1970s, she was being supported financially by Tatum, who was in the custody of her former husband. Despite treatment, Moore continued to struggle with alcoholism and drug addiction. As a result, she was arrested five times for DUI during the 1980s.

== Death ==
A long-time smoker, Moore was diagnosed with lung cancer in 1996. She died from the illness on November 22, 1997, at age 63. Her daughter Tatum was by her side at the time of her death. Moore's ashes were taken to her hometown of Americus, Georgia, and buried at Oak Grove Cemetery.

== Filmography ==
Film
Year	Title	Role	Notes
1957	Appointment with a Shadow	Penny Spencer	Alternative title: If I Should Die
1957	Slim Carter	Charlene Carroll	
1958	Flood Tide	Barbara Brooks	
1958	Touch of Evil	Marcia Linnekar	
1958	Ride a Crooked Trail	Little Brandy	
1958	Monster on the Campus	Madeline Howard	
1959	The Last Angry Man	Alice Taggart	
1962	Walk on the Wild Side	Miss Precious	
1962	Follow That Dream	Alicia Claypoole	
1963	Son of Flubber	Desiree de la Roche	
1963	The Man from Galveston	Rita Dillard	
1966	Nevada Smith	Angie Coe, Saloon Girl & Widow of Jesse Coe	Uncredited
1968	Countdown	Mickey Stegler	
1968	Never a Dull Moment	Melanie Smooth	
1972	J.C.	Miriam Wages	Alternative title: Iron Horsemen
1975	The Hindenburg	Mrs. Channing	
1986	Run, Chrissie, Run!	Cricket coach	Alternative title: Moving Targets, (final film role)

Television
Year	Title	Role	Notes
1956	Lux Video Theatre	Stephanie	Season 7 Episode 8: "Jezebel"
1957	Goodyear Theater	Alice Bowles	Season 1 Episode 2: "Lost and Found"
1958	Bachelor Father	Diana Webster	Season 2 Episode 2: "Parent's Night"
1958	Alfred Hitchcock Presents	Judy Archer	Season 3 Episode 33: "Post-Mortem"
1958	Kraft Television Theatre	Paula Carter	Season 11 Episode 43: "Death for Sale"
1958	Perry Mason	Patricia Taylor	Season 1 Episode 38: "The Case of the Terrified Typist"
1959	Alfred Hitchcock Presents	Virginia Pond	Season 4 Episode 36: "Invitation to an Accident"
1959	Alfred Hitchcock Presents	Cindy Rainey	Season 5 Episode 5: "No Pain"
1959	Maverick	Linda	Season 3 Episode 8: "The Lass with the Poisonous Air"
1959	The Rifleman	Eleanor Claremont	Season 2 Episode 4: "Obituary"
1960	Tales of Wells Fargo	Arlene Howell	Season 4 Episode 18: "The Easterner"
1960	Gunsmoke	Colleen Tawny	Season 5 Episode 29: "Colleen So Green"
1960	Gunsmoke	Cherry O'Dell	Season 5 Episode 39: "Cherry Red"
1960	Adventures in Paradise	Ricky	Season 1 Episode 21: "The Siege of Troy"
1961	The Brothers Brannagan	Amanda Barnes	Season 1 Episode 38: "A Matter of Millions"
1961	The Untouchables	Althea	Season 2 Episode 28: "The Nero Rankin Story"
1961	Follow the Sun	Constance	Season 1 Episode 14: "The Far Side of Nowhere"
1961	Route 66	Trinket	Season 1 Episode 26: "A Skill for Hunting"
1962	Alfred Hitchcock Presents	Louise Towers	Season 7 Episode 31: "Most Likely to Succeed"
1962	Ripcord	Jill Kelly	Season 2 Episode 3: "Chute to Kill"
1962	The Dick Powell Show	Jeanne Lauring	Season 1 Episode 19: "Squadron"
1962	Route 66	Lola	Season 2 Episode 28: "There I Am - There I Always Am"
1962	The Andy Griffith Show	Peggy 'Peg' McMillan	Season 3 Episode 2: "Andy's Rich Girlfriend" Season 3 Episode 4: "Andy and Opie - Bachelors" Season 3 Episode 6: "Barney Mends a Broken Heart" Season 3 Episode 10: "Opie's Rival"
1963	Going My Way	Gerry	Season 1 Episode 17: "Don't Forget to Say Goodbye"
1963	The Dakotas	Doll Harvey	Season 1 Episode 10: "Justice at Eagle's Nest"
1963	Perry Mason	Grace Olney	Season 7 Episode 6: "The Case of the Reluctant Model"
1964	The Fugitive	Helen Simmons	Season 1 Episode 27: "Never Stop Running"
1964	The Lieutenant	Julie Havener	Season 1 Episode 18: "Interlude"
1964	The Alfred Hitchcock Hour	Danielle	Season 2 Episode 28: "Who Needs an Enemy?"
1964	The Greatest Show on Earth	Denny Greenleaf	Season 1 Episode 29: "There Are No Problems, Only Opportunities"
1965	The Alfred Hitchcock Hour	Madeleine	Season 3 Episode 12: "Crimson Witness"
1965	The Fugitive	Joan Mitchell	Season 3 Episode 3: "Crack in a Crystal Ball"
1965	The Man from U.N.C.L.E.	Fran Parsons	Season 1 Episode 15: "The Deadly Decoy Affair"
1965	The Wild Wild West	Linda Medford	Season 1 Episode 15: "The Night of the Fatal Trap"
1965	Gunsmoke	Honey Dare	Season 10 Episode 34: "Honey Pot"
1966	The Fugitive	Ruth Bianchi	Season 4 Episode 10: "Nobody Loses All the Time"
1966	Run for Your Life	Kay Mills	Season 2 Episode 10: "The Man Who Had No Enemies"
1966	The Felony Squad	Betty Reilly	Season 1 Episode 16: "Miss Reilly's Revenge"
1967	Bewitched	Daphne Harper	Season 3 Episode 25: "Charlie Harper, Winner"
1967	T.H.E. Cat	Valerie Evans	Season 1 Episode 20: "Design for Death"
1967	The Virginian	Carol Fisk	Season 6 Episode 11: "To Bear Witness"
1968	The F.B.I.	Paula Gilbert	Season 3 Episode 26: "The Tunnel"
1969	Judd, for the Defense	Barbara Townsend	Season 2 Episode 24: "Visitation"
1969	The High Chaparral	Charlene "Charly" Converse	Season 3 Episode 9: "Lady Fair"
1970	The Name of the Game	Emily	Season 3 Episode 2: "A Love to Remember"
1970	The Most Deadly Game	Paula Winton	Season 1 Episode 8: "Nightbirds"
1974	Police Story	Lisa Roberts	Season 2 Episode 10: "Explosion"
1974	The Waltons	Laura Sue Champion	Season 3 Episode 12: "The Departure"
1975	Kung Fu	Lula Morgan	Season 3 Episode 20: "The Brothers Caine"
1976	Petrocelli	Kay Willis	Season 2 Episode 20: "Death Ride"
1980	Scout's Honor	Ms. Odom	Television film
