= Patrick O'Neal (sportscaster) =

American sportscaster (born 1967)

- Born: September 14, 1967 (age 58); Santa Monica, California, U.S.
- Occupations: Sports reporter, studio host, TV play-by-play commentator
- Years active: 1989–present
- Children: 2
- Parent(s): Ryan O'Neal; Leigh Taylor-Young
- Relatives: Tatum O'Neal (half-sister); Griffin O'Neal (half-brother); Redmond O'Neal (Half-brother)

Patrick O'Neal (born September 14, 1967) is an American sportscaster and occasional actor.

== Life ==
O'Neal is the son of actor Ryan O'Neal and actress Leigh Taylor-Young. He is the half-brother of Griffin O'Neal, Tatum O'Neal, and Redmond O'Neal. His paternal ancestry is Irish, English, and Ashkenazi Jewish.

He has two daughters from his relationship with actress Rebecca De Mornay.

== Broadcast career ==
Most of his appearances come during pregame and postgame shows of the Los Angeles Angels and Los Angeles Kings. He also provides game breaks for Fox College Football. He was previously a studio host for Fox College Football and provided in-game highlights for Fox NFL Sunday.

On August 21 and August 28, 2005, he was the studio host of Fox Saturday Baseball when regular host Jeanne Zelasko was on maternity leave, and he was a sideline reporter for two NFL on Fox games during the 2005 NFL season. He was also the dugout reporter for Games 3 and 5 of the 2005 National League Championship Series and Game 5 of the 2005 American League Championship Series. For one season, he was the in-game highlights host for Fox NFL Sunday before being succeeded by Joel Klatt.

Since 2021, O'Neal has been the secondary TV play-by-play commentator for the Los Angeles Angels alongside Mark Gubicza when Matt Vasgersian is not available. When Vasgersian is broadcasting for the Angels, O'Neal works as sideline reporter or studio host for the team's pre-game/post-game show.

== Filmography ==
- Fever Pitch (1985) – Dancer at 'The Brewery' Nightclub
- China Beach (1989) – C.O.
- Daughter of the Streets (1990, TV movie) – Alex
- Die Hard 2 (1990) – Cpl. Telford (Blue Light Team)
- Beverly Hills, 90210 (1990) – George Sudaris
- Pensacola: Wings of Gold (1998) – Hondo
- A Table for One (1999) – Brad
- Just for the Time Being (2000) – Billy Fischer
- Pacific Blue (2000) – Thomas J. Craiden
- Lost in the Pershing Point Hotel (2000) – Angry Bartender
- The Right Temptation (2000) – Carl
- Wild Hogs (2007) – Family Dad
