= Griffin O'Neal =

American actor (born 1964)

- Born: Griffin Patrick O'Neal; October 28, 1964 (age 62); Los Angeles, California, U.S.
- Occupation: Actor
- Years active: 1976–1992
- Spouses: Rima Uranga (m. 1989; div. 1991) JoAnna Berry (m. 2008)
- Children: 4
- Parent(s): Ryan O'Neal; Joanna Moore
- Relatives: Tatum O'Neal (sister); Patrick O'Neal (half-brother)

Griffin Patrick O'Neal (born October 28, 1964) is an American actor. He has appeared in films such as The Escape Artist, April Fool's Day, The Wraith, Assault of the Killer Bimbos, and Ghoulies III.

== Early life and career ==
Griffin O'Neal was born in Los Angeles to actor Ryan O'Neal and his first wife, actress Joanna Moore (born Dorothy Joanne Cook). Griffin has an older sister, Tatum O'Neal, and two younger half brothers, Patrick O'Neal and Redmond O'Neal. Griffin's grandfather was novelist and screenwriter Charles "Blackie" O'Neal. His paternal ancestry is Irish, English, and Ashkenazi Jewish.

Early in his childhood, O'Neal and his sister lived with their mother in squalid conditions. Their mother struggled with drug and alcohol addiction while they were in her care. She eventually lost custody of them.

Griffin O'Neal appeared in 11 movies between 1976 and 1992. Several of these were TV movies or films released directly to video. Film critic Vincent Canby of the New York Times wrote in 1982 that Griffin O'Neal "shares with his sister a natural screen presence." Likewise, film critic Leonard Maltin wrote that Griffin O'Neal has a "pleasing screen presence".

O'Neal was cast in Francis Ford Coppola's 1987 film Gardens of Stone, but he asked to be replaced after he caused a boating accident that killed Coppola's elder son Gian-Carlo.

== Personal life ==
Griffin left Los Angeles in 2007 and moved to a small town near the Mexico border.

=== Marriages ===
O'Neal married his first wife Rima Uranga in 1989; they divorced in 1991. They have a daughter together. He has been married to Joanna Berry since 2008 and has three children.

=== Substance abuse and relationship with Ryan O'Neal ===
O'Neal was estranged from his father Ryan O'Neal. They had a volatile relationship since his childhood. O'Neal's struggle with addiction began when he was 9 years old. He told People magazine, "My life has been a reign of drug and alcohol degradation. I had to self-medicate my entire life because there was pain everywhere. There were drugs everywhere in my family all day, every day." He claims that his family's problems stemmed from his father, who gave him cocaine at the age of 11. "He was a very abusive, narcissistic psychopath. He gets so mad he can't control anything he's doing," O'Neal said.

In 1983, O'Neal reported to authorities that his father punched out two of his front teeth, but he decided not to press charges.

In 2007, Ryan O'Neal was arrested for assault after shooting at Griffin during a dispute. Prosecutors decided not to file charges. "The last time I saw my dad, he shot at me because I was trying to help his son [Redmond] get sober, so I haven't talked to him in nine years," he told People in 2015.

O'Neal was banned by his father from attending the funeral services for Farrah Fawcett, the mother of his half-brother Redmond O'Neal, in 2009.

O'Neal was reportedly three years sober in 2015.

=== Legal problems ===
In 1986, Griffin O'Neal had a boating accident in Annapolis, Maryland, that took the life of film producer Gian-Carlo Coppola. O'Neal, who was piloting the boat, tried to pass between two other boats, unaware that they were connected by a towline. O'Neal barely had time to duck, but Coppola was struck by the towline and killed. O'Neal was convicted of negligently operating a boat, and later received an 18-day jail sentence for not completing community service. He was released after 15 days. In 1987, Francis Ford Coppola sued O'Neal and seven others for negligence.

O'Neal was arrested multiple times for driving under the influence. He pleaded no contest to a drunk driving charge in 1989. He also pleaded no contest in 1992 to charges that he shot at his estranged girlfriend's unoccupied car.

In August 2011, O'Neal collided with another car while driving. He was sentenced to 16 months in prison for driving under the influence of drugs in connection with that incident.

In January 2012, O'Neal was arrested for domestic battery after he pushed his wife out of the way in an attempt to drink and drive.

== Filmography ==
Year	Title	Role	Notes
1976	Nickelodeon	Bicycle Boy	
1982	The Escape Artist	Danny Masters	
1983	Hadley's Rebellion	Hadley Hickman	
1986	The Children of Times Square	Rick	TV movie
1986	April Fool's Day	Skip	
1986	The Wraith	Oggie Fisher	
1988	Assault of the Killer Bimbos	Troy	
1989	Night Children	Blade	
1989	Jesse Hawkes	Cpl. Stevens	Episode: "The Centurians"
1990	Return to Justice	Bo Johnson	
1991	Ghoulies Go to College	Blane	Alternate title: Ghoulies III
1992	Soulmates	Brian	

== Bibliography ==
- Holmstrom, John. The Moving Picture Boy: An International Encyclopaedia from 1895 to 1995. Norwich, Michael Russell, 1996, p. 350-351.
