= Get to Know Your Rabbit =

1972 film by Brian De Palma

- Theatrical release poster
- Directed by: Brian De Palma
- Written by: Jordan Crittenden
- Produced by: Steven Bernhardt; Paul Gaer
- Starring: Tom Smothers; John Astin; Katharine Ross; Orson Welles
- Cinematography: John A. Alonzo
- Edited by: Frank J. Urioste; Peter Colbert
- Music by: Jack Elliott; Allyn Ferguson
- Production companies: Acrobatic Motion Works; West
- Distributed by: Warner Bros.
- Release date: June 7, 1972 (Los Angeles)
- Running time: 92 minutes
- Country: United States
- Language: English

Get to Know Your Rabbit is a 1972 American comedy film written by Jordan Crittenden and directed by Brian De Palma.

== Plot ==
Corporate executive Donald Beeman, fed up with the rat race, impulsively quits his job and takes to the road as a traveling tap dancing magician under the tutelage of Mr. Delasandro. His former boss Paul Turnbull, determined to convince him to return to his nine-to-five existence, chases after him as he performs his routine in seedy nightclubs and honky tonks, but instead the two create Tap Dancing Magicians, a course for pressured businessmen. When their little venture becomes one of the most successful corporations in the world, Donald ironically finds himself feeling the same way he did when he originally quit his job.

== Cast ==
- Tom Smothers as Donald Beeman
- John Astin as Paul Turnbull
- Katharine Ross as Terrific-Looking Girl
- Orson Welles as Mr. Delasandro
- Susanne Zenor as Paula
- Samantha Jones as Susan
- Allen Garfield as Vic
- Hope Summers as Mrs. Beeman
- Charles Lane as Mr. Beeman
- Jack Collins as Mr. Reese
- Larry D. Mann as Mr. Seager
- Jessica Myerson as Mrs. Reese
- M. Emmet Walsh as Mr. Wendel
- Helen Page Camp as Mrs. Wendel
- Pearl Shear as Flo
- Robert Ball as Mr. Weber
- George Ives as Mr. Morris
- Anne Randall as Stewardess
- Bob Einstein as Police Officer
- King Moody as TV Reporter
- Judy Marcione as Mrs. Parsons
- Timothy Carey as Cop (uncredited)

== Production ==
Brian De Palma achieved success with his 1968 underground comedy Greetings and was hired by Warner Bros. to direct Get to Know Your Rabbit in 1970 after he had directed a follow-up to Greetings called Hi, Mom!. While very much a studio picture, Get to Know Your Rabbit was in line with De Palma's previous films, which were mainly comedies.

Much of the film's comedy is rooted in the traditional British absurdist sense of humor associated with Monty Python and The Goon Show. Jordan Crittenden's screenplay is filled with oddball characters and bizarre situations, such as Miss Simmons, a bomber who is put on hold when she phones to announce that her device will explode in six minutes and a beautiful young woman (Katharine Ross) who confesses to Donald that her crush on the paperboy prompted her to prostitute herself in order to afford a newspaper subscription.

Warner Bros. and star Tommy Smothers felt uneasy about De Palma's direction because of his limited experience. According to De Palma, Smothers so disliked the film that he disappeared for several shooting days and refused to return for retakes. Unhappy with De Palma's cut of the film, the studio asked Peter Nelson, credited onscreen as executive producer, to recut it and direct a new sequence, but the film was not released for several years. Uncertain as to how to market the film, the studio did little to promote it and the film quickly disappeared from theaters. The experience gave De Palma a distaste for the studio system, and he would not work for a major studio again for several years. After the production of Get to Know Your Rabbit, De Palma would turn his focus to themes of suspense and obsession with a horror film called Sisters. These themes would recur in many of his subsequent films.

== Reception ==
Vincent Canby of The New York Times called De Palma "a very funny filmmaker. He's most funny, so far, anyway, when he's most anarchic, and Get to Know Your Rabbit, though somewhat inhibited by conventional form, has enough hilarious loose ends and sidetracks to liberate the film from its form." Arthur D. Murphy of Variety wrote, "Jordan Crittenden's original screenplay has some good ideas in it, but the implementation is mostly gross and heavy. Many sequences exist to make weak sidebar points, thereby dragging down the main story thrust which itself is weighted with concerted slapstick." Charles Champlin of the Los Angeles Times stated that despite the bad advance buzz, the film "turns out to be a very, very nice little comedy which I hope stays around long enough for the good word to multiply. It is a truly zany comedy, full of surprises and invention, and the happiest surprise is that, although the pace falters once or twice, the tone never does. And the tone is of a kind of optimistic irreverence, grownup but innocent, pointed but not savage." Gene Siskel of the Chicago Tribune gave the film 3 stars out of 4 and reported finding it "a most leisurely and charming comedy." Gary Arnold of The Washington Post wrote, "Smothers and De Palma seem to have vastly overrated the satiric or merely humorous potential of their material, an inept 'original' screenplay by Jordan Crittenden. If the movie is any indication, the script was short on funny situations, credible characters and conflicts, bright dialogue, continuity and common sense. De Palma's shaky direction aggravates the weaknesses."

== See also ==
- List of American films of 1972
