= Lisle Wilson =

American actor (1943–2010)

- Born: Lisle Astor Wilson Jr. September 2, 1943; Brooklyn, New York, U.S.
- Died: March 14, 2010 (aged 66); Huntington Beach, California, U.S.
- Occupation: Actor
- Years active: 1970–1992

Lisle Astor Wilson Jr. (September 2, 1943 – March 14, 2010) was an American actor known for playing Leonard Taylor on the ABC sitcom That's My Mama which ran from 1974 to 1975. His film roles included appearances in Brian De Palma's horror film Sisters (1972) and The Incredible Melting Man (1977). He was also recognized for his guest appearances on television programs such as Lou Grant, The White Shadow, and Falcon Crest.

Wilson died on March 14, 2010, at the age of 66.

== Filmography ==
Year	Title	Role	Notes
1970	Cotton Comes to Harlem	4th Black Beret	
1971	Mississippi Summer	Willy	
1972	Sisters	Phillip Woode	
1977	The Incredible Melting Man	Dr. Loring	
1986	Just Between Friends	Newswriter	
