= Hi, Mom =

Hi, Mom may refer to:

- Hi Mom, a (1957–1960) local morning children's television show which aired on WRCA-TV (WNBC) in New York City, starring Shari Lewis
- Hi, Mom!, 1970 American film
- Hi, Mom (2021 film), 2021 Chinese film

== See also ==
- "Hello Mom", 1971 single by the Mercey Brothers
