= Gerrit Graham =

American stage, television and film actor (1948–2026)

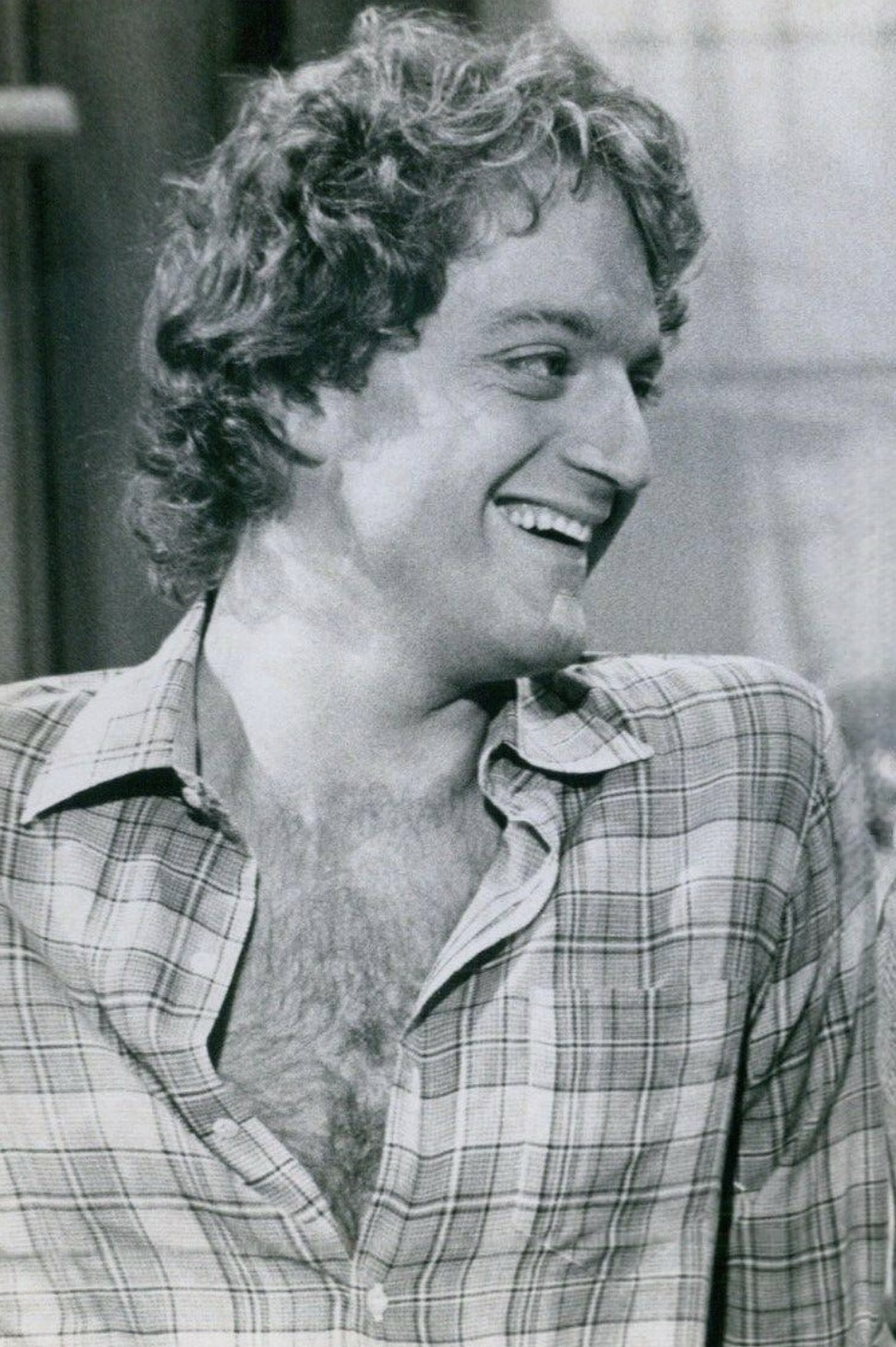
- Graham in Just Friends, 1979
- Born: November 27, 1948; New York City, U.S.
- Died: September 15, 2026 (aged 77); Rhinebeck, New York, U.S.
- Education: Columbia University
- Occupations: Actor, songwriter, screenwriter
- Years active: 1968–2012
- Spouse: Deborah Cooper (m. 1982)
- Children: 2

Gerrit Graham (November 27, 1948 – September 15, 2026) was an American stage, television and film actor, as well as a scriptwriter and songwriter. He was best known for his appearances in multiple films by Brian De Palma as well as appearances in two Star Trek series. He starred in Used Cars with Kurt Russell and voiced Franklin Sherman on The Critic.

== Early life and education ==
Gerrit Graham was born in New York City on November 27, 1948, to parents John and Janet Graham. The family went on to live in Missouri and Michigan before settling in Chicago.

Graham attended, but did not graduate from Columbia University. At Columbia, he was the head of Columbia Players, the college theater company. His future co-worker, Brian De Palma, was also a former manager of the student group during his undergraduate years.

== Career ==
=== Actor ===
==== Film ====
Graham appeared in films such as Used Cars, TerrorVision, National Lampoon's Class Reunion, Child's Play 2 and Greetings, where he worked with Brian De Palma for the first time. He again worked with De Palma on Hi, Mom! and Home Movies, as well as Phantom of the Paradise, where he played flamboyant glam-rocker Beef. Sheila Benson of the Los Angeles Times remarked that Graham and Jon Lovitz were the only actors in Last Resort who were "exempt from the bad-accent stigma."

==== Television ====
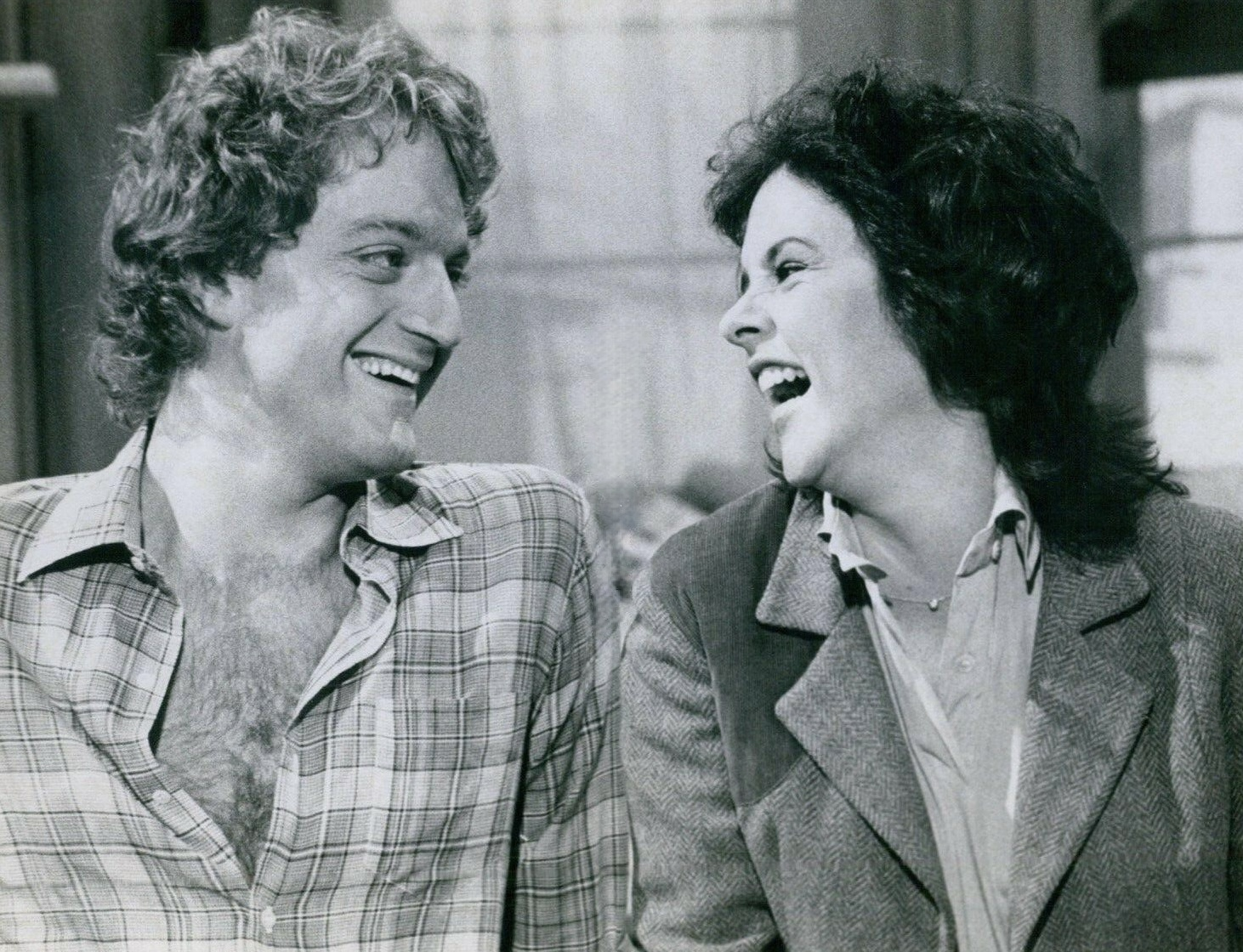
Gerrit Graham and Stockard Channing in Just Friends, 1979

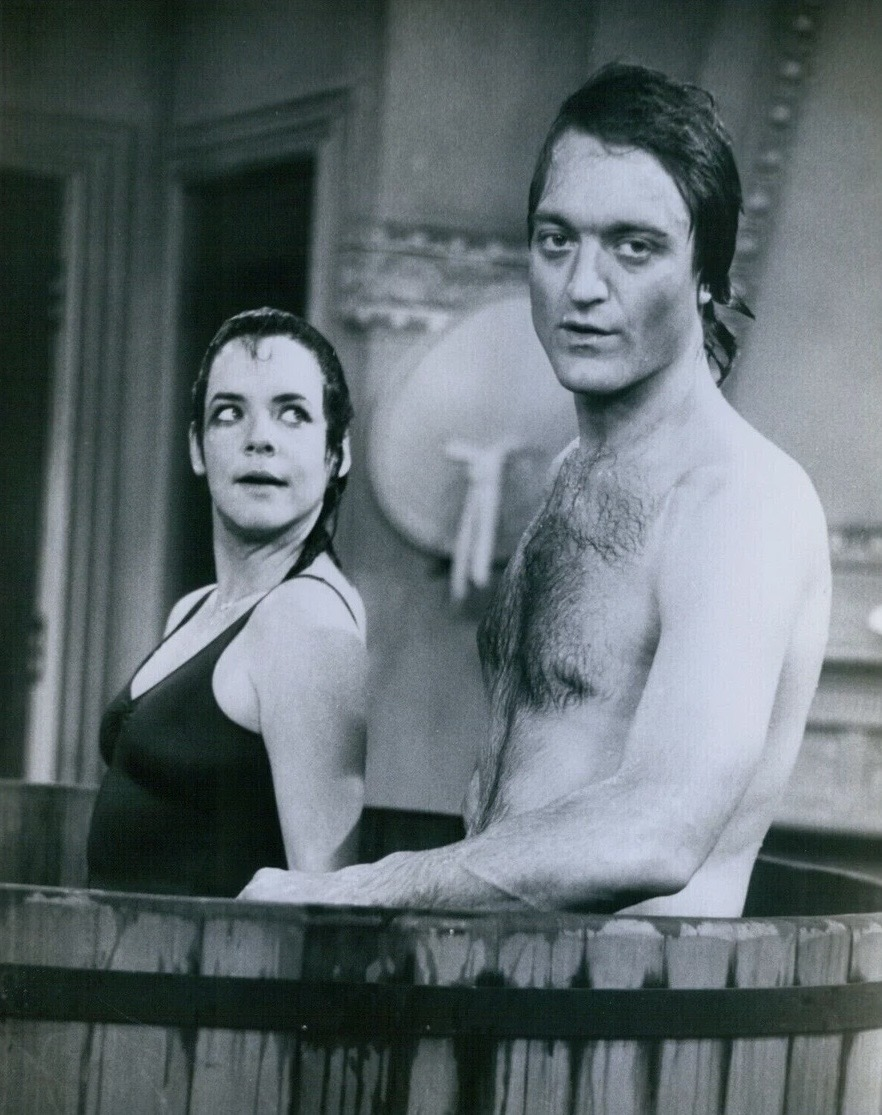
Stockard Channing and Gerrit Graham in Just Friends, 1979

Graham was in the television special Super Vision (1976). He was in Just Friends as Leonard Scribner. Graham in was in six episodes of the twelfth season of the prime time soap opera Dallas as Fred Hughes. He was the voice of Franklin Sherman in the animated series The Critic as well as a recurring role as Dr. Norman Pankow on the sitcom Parker Lewis Can't Lose.

He portrayed two different characters within the Star Trek franchise: the alien hunter of Tosk on Star Trek: Deep Space Nine and a member of the Q Continuum who adopts the name Quinn in the Star Trek: Voyager episode "Death Wish". He was once considered, along with René Auberjonois and Andrew Robinson, for the role of Odo, which went to Auberjonois. Robinson was later cast as Elim Garak.

==== Stage ====
Graham was a stage performer who was in the touring company The Second City. His performances in the 1986 improvisational show Sills & Company and the 1987 play Bouncers by John Godber were positively reviewed by the New York Times. Julio Martinez of Variety called Graham "eerily evocative" of Allard Lowenstein in Dreams Die Hard in 1995. Frank Rizzo of Variety wrote that Graham had "some of the best lines" in his performance as Father Charles Dunbar in The God Committee in 2004. He also played Julian in Communicating Doors in 1998.

=== Writer ===
Graham wrote the teleplays for the episodes "Still Life" and "Opening Day" of the 1980s version of The Twilight Zone. He did not write "Welcome to Winfield", the only episode in which he appeared as a member of the cast. Graham worked as a writer on The Little Mermaid. Along with his brother, Sam, and Chris Hubbell, he co-wrote the Disney film The Prince and the Pauper.

=== Musician ===
Graham was a longtime friend and songwriting collaborator of Bob Weir, guitarist and vocalist of the Grateful Dead. The two met in the 1970s and began writing together in the early 1980s. Their collaboration produced "Victim or the Crime", for which Weir supplied the initial chorus and Graham developed the lyrics. The song was recorded by the Grateful Dead for their 1989 album Built to Last and became part of the band's concert repertoire.

He also contributed lyrics to Weir's side project Bobby and the Midnites, including "(I Want to Live in) America" and "City Girls", both released in 1984. Following the Grateful Dead's dissolution in 1995, he continued collaborating with Weir through RatDog. In a 1999 interview with The New Yorker, Graham explained that he had accumulated a collection of unused lyrics while waiting for the Grateful Dead to record another album. He subsequently developed several songs with Weir for RatDog, including "Two Djinn", which he identified as his favorite of their collaborations.

Graham received songwriting credits on four tracks from RatDog's 2000 studio album Evening Moods: "Bury Me Standing", "Odessa", "Two Djinn" and "Even So". His contributions were primarily lyrical, with the music developed by Weir and other members of RatDog.

The collaboration continued into the 2000s, with Graham providing lyrics for additional RatDog compositions, including "Money for Gasoline" and "Just Like Mama Said". Graham co-wrote the song "Hard Times of America" with David Kraai, which was released on Kraai's album Back to When on June 12, 2026.

== Personal life and death ==
Graham married Deborah Cooper in 1982. They had two children together, Jack and Henry. He died of complications from lung disease on September 15, 2026, at the age of 77.

== Filmography ==
=== Film ===
Year	Title	Role	Notes
1968	Greetings	Lloyd Clay	
1970	Hi, Mom!	Gerrit Wood	
1972	Beware! The Blob	Joe, Ape-Suited Party Guest	
1974	Phantom of the Paradise	Beef	
1976	Tunnel Vision	Freddie	
1976	Bobbie Jo and the Outlaw	Ray "Magic Ray"	
1976	Special Delivery	Swivot	
1976	Cannonball!	Perman Waters	
1977	Demon Seed	Walter Gabler	
1978	Pretty Baby	"Highpockets"	
1979	Old Boyfriends	Sam, The Fisherman	
1979	Home Movies	James Byrd	
1980	Used Cars	Jeff	
1982	Soup for One	Brian	
1982	National Lampoon's Class Reunion	Bob Spinnaker	
1983	The Creature Wasn't Nice	Rodzinski	
1985	The Annihilators	Ray Track	
1985	The Man with One Red Shoe	Carson	
1986	TerrorVision	Stan	
1986	Chopping Mall	Nessler, The Technician	
1986	Last Resort	Curt	
1986	Ratboy	Billy Morrison	
1987	It's Alive III: Island of the Alive	Ralston	
1987	Walker	Norvell Walker	
1987	The Search for Animal Chin	Skateboard Manufacturer	
1989	Big Man on Campus	Stanley Hoyle	
1989	Police Academy 6: City Under Siege	"Ace"	
1989	C.H.U.D. II: Bud the C.H.U.D.	Bud Oliver / Bud the C.H.U.D.	
1989	Martians Go Home	Stan Garrett	
1989	The Little Mermaid	Additional voices	Uncredited
1990	Night of the Cyclone	Lieutenant John France	
1990	Child's Play 2	Phil Simpson	
1992	Frozen Assets	Lewis Crandall	
1992	Sidekicks	Mr. Mapes	
1993	This Boy's Life	Mr. Howard	
1993	Philadelphia Experiment II	Dr. William Mailer / Friedrich Mahler	
1994	My Girl 2	Dr. Sam Helburn	
1995	Stuart Saves His Family	Male Diner	Uncredited
1995	The Break	Bill Cowens	
1996	Magic in the Mirror: Fowl Play	Bloom	
1998	One True Thing	Oliver Most	
2005	Building Girl	Mr. Minard	
2007	Chaotic Ana	Mr. Halcón	
2008	Stick It in Detroit	Captain John Willoughby	
2012	Cove Road	The Hitchhiker	

=== Television ===
Year	Title	Role	Notes
1974	The Rookies	Eric	Episode: "Prelude to Vengeance"
1974	Harry O	Charles Dillon	Episode: "Accounts Balanced"
1975	The Hatfields and the McCoys	Calvin McCoy	Made-for-TV movie directed by Clyde Ware
1975	Baretta	Rick Parrish	Episode: "The 5½ Pound Junkie"
1975	Strange New World	Daniel	Made-for-TV movie Robert Butler
1975	Medical Story	Dr. David Lessing	Episode: "The Right to Die"
1976	Super Vision	Self	Television special directed by Harold Ramis; Segment: "2"; uncredited
1976	Dynasty	Carver Blackwood	Made-for-TV movie directed by Lee Philips
1976	Starsky & Hutch	Nick Manning	Episode: "Nightmare"
1977	Future Cop	Cliff Yancey	Episode: "The Mad Mad Bomber"
1977	Dog and Cat	Mick	Episode: "A Duck Is a Duck"
1978	Laverne & Shirley	Nathan	Episode: "The Dance Studio"
1979	Just Friends	Leonard Scribner	13 episodes
1982	New Wave Theatre	Man on Stage	Episode #1.2; uncredited
1983	The A-Team	Brother Stephen	Episode: "Children of Jamestown"
1983	Likely Stories, Vol. 2	Soap Opera Guy	Made-for-TV movie directed by David Jablin
1983	The Dukes of Hazzard	Baldwin	Episode: "A Baby for the Dukes"; uncredited
1984	Whiz Kids	Jerry Bingers	Episode: "Watch Out!"
1984	The Ratings Game	Parker Braithwaite	Made-for-TV movie directed by Danny DeVito
1986	The Twilight Zone	Griffin St. George	Segment: "Welcome to Winfield"
1986	Fame	Mister Wacky	Episode: "Mister Wacky's World"
1986–87	Sidekicks	Phil Krawcheck	2 episodes
1987	St. Elsewhere	Mr. Gillette	Episode: "Cold War"
1987	Throb	George	Episode: "Genius"
1987	Sledge Hammer!	Prosecuting Attorney	Episode: "Jagged Sledge"
1987	Rags to Riches	Guest	Episode: "Vegas Rock"
1988	Miami Vice	Calvin Teal	Episode: "The Cows of October"
1988	My Two Dads	Carlton Crow	Episode: "The Family in Question"
1988–89	Dallas	Fred Hughes	6 episodes
1989	Dear John	Gary	Episode: "For a Friend"
1989	Tales from the Crypt	Theodore Carne	Episode: "The Man Who Was Death"
1989	The Young Riders	J.D. Marcus	Episode: "Ten-Cent Hero"
1989	The Nutt House	Eric – Safety Inspector	Episode: "A Night at the Reunion"
1990	Sugar and Spice	Cliff	Episode: "The Truck Stops Here"
1990	China Beach	Captain Soubra	Episode: "The Gift"
1990	Parenthood	Ed Lambkin	Episode: "My Dad Can Beat Up Your BMW"
1990–92	Parker Lewis Can't Lose	Dr. Norman Pankow	Recurring role
1991	The Wonder Years	Dr. Tucker	Episode: "Courage"
1991	Stat	Dr. Gus Rivers	2 episodes
1991	Reasonable Doubts	Patrick Pierce	Episode: "Dicky's Got the Blues"
1991	Davis Rules	Howard Buckley	Episode: "They're Writing Songs of Love, But Nun for Me"
1992	A Different World	Henry Krum	Episode: "Bedroom at the Top"
1992	TV's Bloopers & Practical Jokes	Photographer	Episode: "Sherman Hemsley/Melissa Reeves"
1992	The New WKRP in Cincinnati	P.J. Bartman	Episode: "Sex, Lies & Videotape"
1992	Likely Suspects	Billy Burrows	Episode: "The Cheese Stands Alone"
1992	Civil Wars	Whit Buffum	Episode: "Below the Beltway"
1992	Seinfeld	Clown	Episode: "The Opera"; uncredited
1992	Fievel's American Tails	Cat Roger Waul (voice)	Recurring role; 10 episodes
1992	Family Matters	Landlord	Episode: "The Oddest Couple"
1993	Star Trek: Deep Space Nine	The Hunter	Episode: "Captive Pursuit"
1993	Love Matters	Phillips	Episode: "Vegas Rock"
1993	Moon Over Miami	Tommy Fender	Episode: "In a Safe Place"
1993–95	The Pink Panther	Various	Voice; 39 episodes
1994	Babylon 5	Lord Kiro	Episode: "Signs and Portents"
1994	Shake, Rattle and Rock!	Lipsky	Made-for-TV movie directed by Allan Arkush
1994	Diagnosis: Murder	Joseph Boland	Episode: "My Four Husbands"
1994–95	The Critic	Franklin Sherman (voice)	Recurring role; 23 episodes
1995	Lois & Clark: The New Adventures of Superman	Munch	Episode: "The Eyes Have It"
1995	Family Reunion: A Relative Nightmare	Mark McKenna Sr.	Made-for-TV movie directed by Neal Israel
1995	The Wasp Woman	Arthur	Made-for-TV movie directed by Jim Wynorski
1995	The Tick	Milo (voice)	Episode: "Armless But Not Harmless"
1995	The Larry Sanders Show	Kevin	Episode: "0.409"
1995	National Lampoon's Favorite Deadly Sins	The Devil	Made-for-TV movie directed by David Jablin and Denis Leary
1995	Dumb and Dumber	Various (voices)	2 episodes
1995–96	Gargoyles	Guardian (voice)	4 episodes
1996	Weird Science	Dr. Victor Frankenstein	Episode: "Searching for Boris Karloff"
1996	Star Trek: Voyager	Q/Quinn	Episode: "Death Wish"
1996–97	Bruno the Kid	Additional voices	3 episodes
1998	The Love Letter	Warren Whitcomb	Made-for-TV movie directed by Dan Curtis
1998–2000	Law & Order	Mr. Hutchins / Alan Bruder	2 episodes
1999–2000	Now and Again	Roger Bender	Recurring role; 22 episodes
2005	Third Watch	Charles Benjamin	Episode: "Welcome Home"
2009	Au Pair 3: Adventure in Paradise	Rupert	Made-for-TV movie directed by Mark Griffiths
