= Tina Hirsch =

American film editor

- Born: 1943 (age 82–83)
- Occupation: Film editor

Tina Hirsch (born 1943)—also known as Bettina Kugel Hirsch, Bettina Hirsch, and Bettina Kugel—is an American film editor and an adjunct professor of editing at the University of Southern California.

Tina Hirsch began to edit films in the late 1960s, serving as an assistant editor on Woodstock (1970) and Hi, Mom! (1970). She edited several films for New World Pictures including Death Race 2000 (1975) and Eat My Dust! (1976). She advanced to editing major studio films, including the sequels More American Graffiti (1979) and Airplane II: The Sequel (1982). In the '80s, she was a regular editor for New World Pictures alumnus Joe Dante's films, including the "It's a Good Life" sequence in Twilight Zone: The Movie (1983) as well as Gremlins (1984) and Explorers (1985). Hirsch would later direct Munchies (1987) for New World's founder Roger Corman, one of the many low-budget movies that were imitative of Dante's Gremlins.

Hirsch edited episodes of the television series The West Wing ("A Proportional Response", 1999, and "What Kind of Day Has It Been", 2000), for which she was nominated for an Emmy for "Outstanding Single Camera Picture Editing for a Series" and for which she also won an Eddie Award from the American Cinema Editors. In 2005, she was nominated for a second Emmy for editing the television miniseries Back When We Were Grownups (2004).

She has been elected to membership in the American Cinema Editors, and she was the first female president of the honorary society. Hirsch currently serves on the board of ACE, and has done so for more than two decades.

Since 2003, Hirsch has spent her time working as an adjunct professor of editing at USC film school.

== Selected filmography ==
Editor
Year	Film	Director	Notes	Other notes
1969	Utterly Without Redeeming Social Value	Charles Hirsch		
1974	Macon County Line	Richard Compton	First collaboration with Richard Compton	
1974	Big Bad Mama	Steve Carver		
1975	Death Race 2000	Paul Bartel		
1976	Eat My Dust!	Charles B. Griffith		
1977	The Ransom	Richard Compton	Second collaboration with Richard Compton	
1978	The Driver	Walter Hill		
1979	More American Graffiti	Bill L. Norton		
1981	Heartbeeps	Allan Arkush	First collaboration with Allan Arkush	
1982	Airplane II: The Sequel	Ken Finkleman		
1983	Independence Day	Robert Mandel		
1983	Twilight Zone: The Movie	Joe Dante	First collaboration with Joe Dante	"It's a Good Life" segment
1984	Gremlins	Joe Dante	Second collaboration with Joe Dante	
1985	Explorers	Joe Dante	Third collaboration with Joe Dante	
1991	Delirious	Tom Mankiewicz		
1991	Mystery Date	Jonathan Wacks		
1992	Captain Ron	Thom Eberhardt		
1995	Steal Big Steal Little	Andrew Davis		
1997	Dante's Peak	Roger Donaldson		
2006	The Far Side of Jericho	Tim Hunter		

Editorial department
Year	Film	Director	Role	Notes
1970	Hi, Mom!	Brian De Palma	Assistant editor	Second collaboration with Brian De Palma
1980	Xanadu	Robert Greenwald	Co-editor	
1988	Caddyshack II	Allan Arkush	Additional film editor	Second collaboration with Allan Arkush
1992	Honey, I Blew Up the Kid	Randal Kleiser	Additional film editor	

Actress
Year	Film	Director	Role	Notes
1968	Greetings	Brian De Palma	Tina	First collaboration with Brian De Palma
1970	Hi, Mom!	Brian De Palma	N.I.T. Journal	

Director
Year	Film
1987	Munchies

Script and continuity department
Year	Film	Director	Role
1969	Utterly Without Redeeming Social Value	Charles Hirsch	Script girl
1975	Switchblade Sisters	Jack Hill	Script supervisor

Documentaries

Editor
Year	Film	Director
2013	Four Decades Later	Herself
2021	Emily @ the Edge of Chaos	Wendy Apple

Editorial department
Year	Film	Director	Role
1970	Woodstock	Michael Wadleigh	Assistant editor

Director
Year	Film
2013	Four Decades Later

Producer
Year	Film	Director	Credit
2013	Four Decades Later	Herself	Producer

Shorts

Editor
Year	Film	Director
2009	Redemption	Bruce McAlester

Editorial department
Year	Film	Director	Role
2014	happySADhappy	Rachel Feldman	Consulting editor

Additional crew
Year	Film	Director	Role
2014	Light of the Night	Danny Ramirez	Faculty advisor

Thanks
Year	Film	Director	Role
1991	Snowie and the Seven Dorps	Vincent Cafarelli; Candy Kugel	Thanks
2013	Synthetic	Matt Zunich	Special thanks

TV movies

Editor
Year	Film	Director
1978	Just Me and You	John Erman
1995	OP Center	Lewis Teague
1995	Saved by the Light	Lewis Teague
1998	Labor of Love	Karen Arthur
1998	A Will of Their Own	Karen Arthur
1999	Behind the Mask	Tom McLoughlin
2003	Stealing Sinatra	Ron Underwood
2003	The One	Ron Lagomarsino
2004	Plainsong	Richard Pearce
2004	Back When We Were Grownups	Ron Underwood
2006	In from the Night	Peter Levin
2006	The Year Without a Santa Claus	Ron Underwood
2006	The Valley of Light	Brent Shields

TV series

Editor
Year	Title	Notes
1994	Party of Five	1 episode
1995	OP Center	2 episodes
1998	A Will of Their Own	2 episodes
1999−2001	The West Wing	16 episodes
