= Wilford Leach =

American film director (1928–1988)

- Born: Carson Wilford Leach; August 26, 1928; Petersburg, Virginia, U.S.
- Died: June 18, 1988 (aged 59); Rocky Point, New York, U.S.
- Occupations: Theatre director, film director, screenwriter, academic
- Awards: Drama Desk Awards; Tony Award for Best Direction of a Musical; 1981 The Pirates of Penzance; 1986 The Mystery of Edwin Drood

Carson Wilford Leach (August 26, 1928 – June 18, 1988) was an American theatre director, set designer, film director, screenwriter, and professor.

== Biography ==
Leach was born in Petersburg, Virginia, on August 26, 1928. A performance of Pygmalion he saw as a teenager inspired him to work in theatre. After graduating from the College of William & Mary in 1953, Leach went on to earn both a master's degree and a doctorate from the University of Illinois. Leach began teaching at Sarah Lawrence College in 1958. He also taught at the Yale School of Drama during the years 1978 and 1979.

After moving to New York City, Leach became the artistic director of La MaMa Experimental Theatre Club for much of the 1970s. At La MaMa, he frequently collaborated with John Braswell. They directed the ETC Company, a resident company of La MaMa, in a repertory that included adaptations of Carmilla, Demon, The Only Jealousy of Emer, Renard, and Gertrude, a musical about the title character based loosely on Gertrude Stein.

Leach also directed works for Joseph Papp's Public Theater and the New York Shakespeare Festival, where he directed a production of The Pirates of Penzance in 1980 with Kevin Kline, Linda Ronstadt, Rex Smith, and Patricia Routledge. The production transferred to Broadway with the same cast in January 1981, with Estelle Parsons replacing Routledge. Leach won a Tony Award for Best Direction of a Musical for the Broadway production in 1981. Leach directed a film version of The Pirates of Penzance in 1983 with the same cast, with Angela Lansbury replacing Parsons.

Leach's additional theatre directing credits include two projects that originated at the Public and then transferred to Broadway: The Human Comedy (1984) and The Mystery of Edwin Drood (1986), for which he won his second Tony Award.

While teaching at Sarah Lawrence, Leach met then-students Brian De Palma and Cynthia Munroe. In collaboration with De Palma and Munroe, he produced, directed, and wrote the screenplay for the 1969 film The Wedding Party, whose cast included a young Robert De Niro and Jill Clayburgh. He also directed the films All's Well That Ends Well (1978) with Frances Conroy for television and a straight-to-video version of Coriolanus (1979) with Denzel Washington and Morgan Freeman.

The protagonist of Brian De Palma's film Phantom of the Paradise (1974), Winslow Leach, is named after Wilford Leach.

Leach died at the age of 58 from AIDS-related stomach cancer in Rocky Point, New York.
