= Jennifer Salt =

American actress (born 1944)

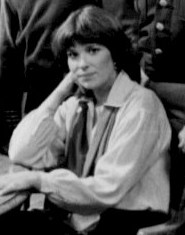
- Salt in 1977
- Born: September 4, 1944 (age 81); Los Angeles, California, U.S.
- Other name: Jenifer Salt
- Education: Sarah Lawrence College
- Occupations: Actress, screenwriter, producer
- Years active: 1968–present
- Spouse: David Greenberg (m. 1976; div. 1980)
- Children: 1
- Father: Waldo Salt

Jennifer Salt (born September 4, 1944) is an American producer, screenwriter, and former actress known for playing Eunice Tate on Soap (1977–1981).

== Life and career ==
Salt was born in Los Angeles, California, to screenwriter Waldo Salt and actress Mary Davenport. She has a younger sister, Deborah. Her stepmother was the writer Eve Merriam. She attended the High School of Performing Arts in New York City, and graduated from Sarah Lawrence College. Salt's father had been blacklisted by Hollywood for most of the 1950s and early 1960s after a run-in with the House Un-American Activities Committee, but managed a triumphant return with the two movies that won him Oscars.

She made several stage appearances, winning a 1971 Theatre World award as Estelle in the play Father's Day, and she portrayed Eunice Tate-Leitner, the snobbish daughter of Chester and Jessica Tate in the television comedy series Soap. An early movie role was in Midnight Cowboy (1969) as Joe Buck's hometown lover, Crazy Annie. While living with actress Margot Kidder in Malibu in the early 1970s, she worked in tandem with American director Brian De Palma in the films The Wedding Party (1969), Hi, Mom! (1970), and Sisters (1972), and appeared with Cornel Wilde and Scott Glenn in the TV film Gargoyles (1972)..

Salt has retired from acting, and pursued a writing career, including episode scripts for Nip/Tuck and other programs. In 1998, she landed her first steady job in her new profession as a low-rung writer on a cable detective drama titled Sins of the City. She is a co-writer of the script for the Julia Roberts film Eat Pray Love (2010) based on Elizabeth Gilbert's best-selling memoir of the same name. She was an executive producer on the American Horror Story anthology series. In 2011, Salt helped work on a pilot for an HBO series based on the memoir Foreign Babes in Beijing written by Rachel DeWoskin.

In 2006, she was nominated for a Writers Guild of America Award for the Nip/Tuck episode "Rhea Reynolds".

== Family ==
Her son, Jonah Greenberg, is a talent agent with CAA Beijing.

== Theater ==
=== Actress ===
Year	Title	Role	Notes
1970	Watercolor	Gloria	
1971	Father's Day	Estelle	Won Theater World award
1981	Hasty Heart		
1982	Diplomacy		

== Filmography ==
=== Actress ===
Year	Title	Role	Notes
1968	Murder a la Mod	a Bird	(credited as Jenifer Salt)
1969	The Wedding Party	Phoebe	
1969	Midnight Cowboy	Annie - Texas	
1970	Hi, Mom!	Judy Bishop	
1970	The Revolutionary	Helen	
1970	Brewster McCloud	Hope	
1972	Play It Again, Sam	Sharon	
1972	Gargoyles	Diana	
1972	Sisters	Grace Collier	aka Blood Sisters
1980	It's My Turn	Maisie	
1985	Out of the Darkness	Ann Zigo	

=== Writer ===
Year	Title	Notes
2003	Tempo	
2010	Eat Pray Love	(Screenplay)

== Television ==
=== Actress ===
Year	Title	Role	Notes
1972	The F.B.I.	Diane	1 episode - "The Franklin Papers"
1972	Gargoyles	Diana Boley	TV movie
1973	Love, American Style		"Love and the Unwedding" segment
1974	The ABC Afternoon Playbreak	Judy Owens	aka ABC Matinee Today
1974	The Great Niagara	Lois	TV movie
1977	All-Star Family Feud Special	Herself	(for Soap)
1978	Family	Susie Robinson	1 episode
1979	$weepstake$		Episode: "Cowboy, Linda and Angie, Mark"
1979	Family Fortune	Herself	2 episodes
1979	The Love Boat	Patricia Lucas	Season 3, episode #5: "My Boyfriend's Back"
1981	Terror Among Us	Connie Paxton	TV movie
1977–1981	Soap	Eunice Tate	63 episodes
1984	Old Friends	Laura King	TV movie
1985	Out of the Darkness	Ann Zigo	TV movie
1986	Magnum, P.I.	Susan Brandis	1 episode - "Find Me a Rainbow"
1981–1986	It's a Living	Deedee	2 episodes
1986	Family Ties	Mrs. Kluger	1 episode - "Be True To Your Preschool"
1987	Deadly Care	Carol	TV movie
1987	Murder, She Wrote	Helen Langley	1 episode - "Indian Giver"
1988	Duet	Cindy	1 episode - "Mommie and Me"
1988	Bustin' Loose	Wanda	1 episode - "The Parent Trap"
1990	Empty Nest	Linda Brody	1 episode - "Take My Mom, Please"
1990	The Marshall Chronicles	Cynthia Brighman	6 episodes
1990	Lifestories	Helen Forchette	1 episode - "Jerry Forchette"

=== Producer ===
Year	Title	Notes
2003–2010	Nip/Tuck	(Producer, Co-Producer, Supervising Producer, Executive Producer)
2010	The Quickening	(Executive Producer)
2011–2022	American Horror Story	(Co-executive Producer)
2020	Ratched	(Executive Producer)

=== Writer ===
Year	Title	Notes
1998	Sins of the City	4 episodes
2000	The Stalking of Laurie Show	TV movie, aka Rivals
2002	A Nero Wolfe Mystery	Episode: "Cop Killer"
2003–2010	Nip/Tuck	19 episodes*
2011–present	American Horror Story	9 episodes
2020	Ratched	2 episodes

(* denotes Writers Guild of America Award nomination)
