= William Finley (actor) =

American actor (1940–2012)

- William Finley
- Born: William Franklin Finley; September 20, 1940; New York City, New York, U.S.
- Died: April 14, 2012 (aged 71); New York City, New York, U.S.
- Education: Columbia University
- Occupation: Actor
- Years active: 1962–2006
- Spouse: Susan Weiser (m. 1975)
- Children: 1

William Franklin Finley (September 20, 1940 – April 14, 2012) was an American actor who appeared in the films The Funhouse, Simon, Silent Rage, Phantom of the Paradise, Sisters and The Wedding Party.

Finley had a long-running friendship and collaboration with director Brian De Palma, beginning with the student films Woton's Wake (1962), The Wedding Party (1966) and Murder à la Mod (1968).

Finley also had roles in three films by director Tobe Hooper, Eaten Alive, The Funhouse and Night Terrors. Under the name W. Franklin Finley, he wrote the screenplay for the film The First Time (1983). He was also the co-author of the book Racewalking (1985).

== Personal life ==
Finley graduated from Columbia University in 1963. He married Susan Weiser in 1975; the couple had one son, Dashiell. The family resided in New York City.

=== Death ===
Finley was diagnosed with an inflamed colon on April 6, 2012. He underwent surgery three days after his admission. He appeared to be doing well after the surgery, but on the morning of April 14, 2012, Finley died aged 71 in New York City. (Note: Some obituaries gave his age as 69.)

== Filmography ==
Year	Title	Role	Notes
1962	Woton's Wake	Woton	Short
1968	Murder à la Mod	Otto	
1969	The Wedding Party	Alistair	Filmed in 1963
1970	Dionysus in '69	Dionysus	
1973	Sisters	Dr. Emil Breton	Credited as Bill Finley
1974	Phantom of the Paradise	Winslow Leach / The Phantom	
1977	Eaten Alive	Roy	
1978	The Fury	Raymond Dunwoodie	
1979	Wise Blood	Man	Uncredited
1980	Simon	Fichandler	
1980	Dressed to Kill	Bobbi	Voice, uncredited
1981	The Funhouse	Marco the Magnificent	
1982	Silent Rage	Dr. Paul Vaughn	
1984	Terror in the Aisles	The Phantom	Archive footage
1985	Double Negative	Milt	Short, credited as Bill Finley
1993	Night Terrors	Dr. Matteson	
2006	The Black Dahlia	George Tilden	Credited as Bill Finley, final film role
