= Sid Conrad =

American actor

- Born: Sid Levington Conrad; August 23, 1923; Otsego, Michigan, U.S.
- Died: April 16, 2010 (aged 86); Williamsburg, Virginia, U.S.
- Occupation: Actor
- Years active: 1969–2009
- Spouse: Sheila Conrad

Sid Levington Conrad (August 23, 1923 – April 16, 2010) was an American television character actor whose career spanned from 1969 to 2009, including occasional feature film roles. His acting credits included more than fifty television shows including JAG, ER, Chicago Hope, Moonlighting, General Hospital, Days of Our Lives, and The Young and the Restless.

Conrad grew up in Otsego, Michigan, and served in the U.S. Army in the European Theater during World War II, including the Battle of the Bulge. He enrolled in Columbia University following World War II, earning both a bachelor's degree and a master's degree in journalism with funding from the G.I. Bill. Conrad also obtained a master's degree in arts administration from the University of California, Los Angeles.

In addition to his television roles, Conrad appeared in regional theater in Alaska, California, Florida and New York City. He appeared in one-man plays, including Spencer Tracy and Will Rogers' USA.

Conrad died in Williamsburg, Virginia, on April 15, 2010, at the age of 86. He was survived by his wife, Sheila; two daughters; and three granddaughters.

== Filmography ==
Year	Title	Role	Notes
1976	King Kong	Petrox Chairman	
1978	A Different Story	Salesman	
1985	The Annihilators	Louie Nace	
1987	Wisdom	Farmer	
1988	Caddyshack II	Naked Man	
1996	The Glimmer Man	Cemetery Priest	
