= Murder a la Mod =

- Grindhouse poster
- Directed by: Brian De Palma
- Written by: Brian De Palma
- Produced by: Ken Burrows
- Starring: Andra Akers; Margo Norton; Jared Martin; William Finley
- Cinematography: Bruce Torbet
- Edited by: Brian De Palma
- Music by: John Herbert McDowell
- Production company: Aries Documentaries
- Distributed by: Aries Documentaries
- Release date: May 1, 1968 (New York City)
- Running time: 80 minutes
- Country: United States
- Language: English
- Budget: $25,000

Murder a la Mod is a 1968 American film directed by Brian De Palma in his first feature film as a director and writer. An experimental, low-budget murder-mystery, it was shot on black-and-white 16 mm film. Following its limited theatrical release, the film was rarely seen until its reissue on DVD in 2006.

In the film, model Karen steals money and jewelry from her friend Tracy, with the intention to offer the stolen items to her fiancé Christopher. She is instead murdered, with her murder recorded in a snuff film. Her re-animated corpse seemingly kills Christopher, though it turns out that the second murder was the result of a miscalculation in a prank.

De Palma retrospectively described the film as "a sophisticated thriller patterned after Psycho ... It has many weaknesses and strengths. It's both good and bad". Later critics have also noted the influence of Michael Powell's Peeping Tom.

== Plot summary ==
In a prologue shown from the point of view of a camera viewfinder, a series of female models in a studio are asked by an off-screen cameraman to undress for a screen test. One model is seemingly stabbed by the unseen man behind the camera.

During an afternoon of shopping in Manhattan's boutiques, Karen, another model, tells her socialite friend Tracy about her fiancé Christopher, a photographer and widower. Tracy visits her bank to withdraw money and jewelry from her safe deposit box, which she places inside a large envelope. Meanwhile, Karen catches sight of Christopher in the street and follows him to his studio, where she discovers he is shooting a sexploitation film featuring a deranged prankster, Otto.

Christopher remorsefully tells Karen that he lied about being a widower, and that he is reluctantly working for the film's producer, Wiley, because he urgently needs money to obtain a divorce from his wife. Karen pleads with Christopher to let her help raise the money. Returning to Tracy's parked car, Karen finds Tracy has gone inside a dress shop, leaving the envelope of valuables under her car seat. Karen impulsively steals the cash from the envelope and hurries back to Christopher's studio, intending to give him the money.

Entering the building, Karen is surprised by Otto, who pretends to stab her with a dummy ice-pick, a prop from Wiley's film, and splashes her with ketchup as a practical joke. After walking inside the studio and cleaning herself up, Karen is then stabbed to death by a genuine assailant wielding a real ice-pick.

The film then shows events from the viewpoints of the three other main characters: Tracy follows Otto, who is wheeling a large trunk apparently containing Karen's corpse to a nearby cemetery; Otto discovers Karen's corpse in the studio and attempts to lure the killer to the cemetery with an empty trunk; while Christopher, who has been spying on Karen and Tracy during their shopping expedition, pursues Otto and Tracy to the cemetery. The killer is revealed to be Christopher, who has secretly filmed his murder of Karen.

After a fight in the cemetery, Christopher and Otto both return separately to the studio. Christopher kills Wiley when he finds him watching the footage of Karen's murder. He then turns and is shocked to see Karen's corpse apparently moving towards him and brandishing an ice-pick, with which she fatally stabs him. Otto, who is then revealed to have been holding up Karen's body as another intended prank, realizes he has mistakenly used the real ice-pick to stab Christopher, and laughs at the irony.

== Cast ==
- Andra Akers as Tracy
- Margo Norton as Karen
- Jared Martin as Chris
- William Finley as Otto
- John Quinn as Mr. Fitzsimmons
- Laura Stevenson as Boutique Girl
- Jack Harrell as Salesman
- Lorenzo Catlett as Policeman
- Melanie Mander as Bird
- Victoria Halboth as Bird
- Ken Burrows as Wiley
- Jenny O'Hara as Soap Opera Actress
- Philip Proctor as Soap Opera Actor
- Jennifer Salt as Bird

== Production ==
Murder a la Mod was shot in New York City over 11 days in 1966 on a budget of $25,000. Locations included the First Calvary Cemetery and Paraphernalia, a Madison Avenue boutique. It was the only film role for Margo Norton (1946−2020), a graduate of Sarah Lawrence College. William Finley (Otto), a frequent actor in Brian De Palma's films, composed and sang the title song.

== Reception ==
During the film's very limited U.S. theatrical release, (Note: Although some sources state the film "played for two weeks in New York City only", it did also have brief runs in Los Angeles and Philadelphia.) it was screened with Paul Bartel's short film The Secret Cinema. Kevin Thomas of the Los Angeles Times said both films were "somewhat sophomoric in tone and crude technically", but "imaginative enough to warrant encouragement to their makers." Thomas felt the first half of Murder a la Mod was "terrible", but that "de Palma then successfully comes to grips with a Rashomon-like technique in presenting the murder from the points of view of everyone involved."

Vincent Canby of the New York Times said the film "has a mind and reality of its own. It's completely logical in its use of cinematic tricks — speeded-up action and slow motion, and slapstick humor that is not funny, juxtaposed with mayhem that is. There is a limit as to just how far this sort of playfulness can be carried."

Variety pronounced the film "technically proficient" and predicted that "its director could have an industry future", but found that "Murder a la Mod ... ends up being unsatisfying". David Nusair of Reel Film Reviews called it "De Palma's first (and worst) feature-length endeavor".

== Home media ==
Murder a la Mod was reissued on DVD by Something Weird Video in 2006. It was subsequently included as a bonus feature on Criterion's Blu-ray edition of De Palma's Blow Out in April 2011. (Note: In Blow Out (1981), Dennis Franz's character is seen watching Murder a la Mod on television.)

== See also ==
- List of American films of 1968
- French New Wave
- New Hollywood
