= The Wedding Party (1969 film) =

1969 film by Brian De Palma, Wilford Leach and Cynthia Munroe

- Theatrical release poster
- Directed by: Brian De Palma; Wilford Leach; Cynthia Munroe
- Written by: Brian De Palma; Wilford Leach; Cynthia Munroe
- Produced by: Brian De Palma; Wilford Leach; Cynthia Munroe
- Starring: Velda Setterfield; Raymond McNally; John Braswell; Charles Pfluger; Jill Clayburgh; William Finley; Robert De Niro
- Cinematography: Peter Powell
- Edited by: Brian De Palma; Wilford Leach; Cynthia Munroe
- Music by: John Herbert McDowell
- Color process: Black and white
- Production company: Ondine Productions
- Distributed by: Ajay Film Company
- Release date: April 9, 1969 (New York City)
- Running time: 92 minutes
- Country: United States
- Language: English
- Budget: $43,000

The Wedding Party is a 1969 American film farce created as a joint effort by Sarah Lawrence College theater professor Wilford Leach and two of his students, protégé Brian De Palma and Cynthia Munroe.

== Plot ==
The film focuses on a soon-to-be groom and his interactions with various relatives of his fiancée and members of the wedding party prior to the ceremony at the family's estate on Shelter Island, New York.

== Cast ==
- Velda Setterfield as Mrs. Fish
- Raymond McNally as Mr. Fish
- John Braswell as Reverend Oldfield
- Charles Pfluger as Charlie
- Jill Clayburgh as Josephine
- William Finley as Alistair
- Jennifer Salt as Phoebe
- Robert De Niro as Cecil

== Production ==
The film was made in 1963. It was bankrolled by Stanley Borden, owner of American Films and Brian De Palma's mentor and employer, who allowed De Palma to produce the film on company time.

== Release ==
The on-screen copyright year is 1966. However, owing to a legal dispute between De Palma and Borden over the rights to the film because Borden thought it was not ready for release, and De Palma insisted on final cut, the film was not released until 1969, after one of its supporting players, Robert De Niro, had begun to draw notice for his work in off-Broadway theatre and De Palma's 1968 release Greetings.

Wilford Leach went on to a successful career as a Tony Award-winning theatre director, while De Palma continued as a well-known film director.

Troma Entertainment later acquired the film's home video rights, heavily exploiting the on-screen appearance of De Niro in its promotional artwork, even though he only had a supporting role. Arrow Video released the film on Blu-ray Disc on December 11, 2018 as part of a collection titled De Niro & De Palma The Early Films, which also included Greetings and Hi, Mom!

== See also ==
- List of American films of 1969
