= Gargoyles (film) =

American television fantasy horror film

- Genre: Horror
- Written by: Stephen and Elinor Karpf
- Directed by: Bill L. Norton
- Starring: Cornel Wilde; Jennifer Salt; Grayson Hall; Bernie Casey
- Music by: Robert Prince
- Country of origin: United States
- Original language: English

Production
- Executive producer: Roger Gimbel
- Producers: Bob Christiansen and Rick Rosenberg
- Production locations: Carlsbad Caverns National Park - 727 Carlsbad Caverns Highway, Carlsbad, New Mexico; Laredo, Texas; Whites City, New Mexico; Guadalupe Mountains, New Mexico
- Cinematography: Earl Rath
- Editor: Frank P. Keller A.C.E.
- Running time: 74 minutes
- Production company: Tomorrow Entertainment

Original release
- Network: CBS
- Release: November 21, 1972

Gargoyles is an American made-for-television fantasy horror film, directed by Bill L. Norton, and originally broadcast Tuesday, November 21, 1972 for the CBS series The New CBS Tuesday Night Movies. It was the first film to feature the make-up work of special effects artist Stan Winston, for which he shared the 1973 Emmy Award for Outstanding Achievement in Makeup.

== Plot ==
Dr. Mercer Boley and his daughter Diana are traveling in Devil's Crossing, New Mexico, for his scientific research. They are shown a skeleton of a large creature with wings and horns at a place called Uncle Willie's Desert Museum. Mercer dismisses it as a hoax assembled from unrelated bones, but Willie insists that he found the bones together as a whole skeleton. While Willie tells them tales of demons from American Indian folklore, an unseen force attacks and burns down the building, killing Willie. The Boleys escape with the horned skull and take it to a motel.

The next morning, they report to the police and return to the site of the fire. There, they find a group of motorcyclists, led by James Reeger, riding around the ruins. The police arrest them on suspicion of causing the fire. That night, two gargoyles invade the motel to retrieve the skull, but one is fatally hit by a truck while the other gets away with the skull. Diana returns to the police station and pleads for the bikers' innocence, but the deputy says only a judge can release them after charges have been filed. She tells Reeger about the dead gargoyle, but he doesn't believe her.

As Diana returns to the motel, more gargoyles arrive to recover the dead one, knocking Mercer unconscious and kidnapping Diana. At the gargoyle's cave, the gargoyle leader tells Diana that they have only been alive for a few weeks after a 500-year incubation, and that humans have repeatedly killed them off in the past, but he vows that they will survive this time. He has several of Mercer's books, apparently also taken from the car, and insists that Diana read to him. Dr. Boley convinces the police chief to release the bikers and search for Diana, and Reeger joins them. Hotel proprietor Mrs. Parks and her helper drive away to get assistance, but the search party later finds her dead and the helper missing.

The gargoyle queen warns the leader that humans are approaching the cave, so he sends his soldiers to battle them. Both sides have casualties. The leader boasts to Mercer that "This is the end of your age, the beginning of mine." The queen appears jealous of the leader's attention to Diana, so she leads Mercer to her and lets them escape. Reeger sacrifices himself to destroy the gargoyle eggs, and Mercer disables the queen's wing with a rock so she cannot fly. Realizing the battle is lost, the leader picks up the queen and flies away with her to create a new nest somewhere.

== Cast ==
- Cornel Wilde as Mercer Boley
- Jennifer Salt as Diana Boley
- Grayson Hall as Mrs. Parks
- Bernie Casey as The Gargoyle
- Scott Glenn as James Reeger
- William Stevens as Police Chief
- John Gruber as Jesse
- Woody Chambliss as Uncle Willie
- Jim Connell as Buddy
- Tim Burns as Ray
- Mickey Alzola
- Greg Walker
- Rock Walker as Gargoyles

Uncredited

- Vic Perrin (opening narration and voice of Gargoyle leader)
