= Allen Garfield =

American actor (1939–2020)

- Garfield in the 1970s
- Born: Allen Goorwitz; November 22, 1939; Newark, New Jersey, U.S.
- Died: April 7, 2020 (aged 80); Woodland Hills, California, U.S.
- Occupation: Actor
- Years active: 1968–2016

Allen Garfield (born Allen Goorwitz; November 22, 1939 – April 7, 2020) was an American film and television actor.

== Early life ==
Garfield was born in Newark, New Jersey, to a Jewish family, the son of Alice (née Lavroff) and Philip Goorwitz. He had one sister, Lois. A 1957 graduate of Weequahic High School, he was a sports reporter and Golden Gloves boxer before becoming an actor. He attended The Actors Studio in New York City, studying with both Lee Strasberg and Elia Kazan, and worked on stage before acting in film.

== Career ==
Garfield appeared in over 100 films and television shows. He is known for having played nervous villains, corrupt businessmen and politicians. In addition he appeared in two art films by German director Wim Wenders, Der Stand der Dinge and Bis ans Ende der Welt. Quentin Tarantino studied with Garfield at the beginning of his career as an actor. Garfield's lead roles included the 1971 film Cry Uncle!, the 1978 film Skateboard with Leif Garrett and the 1982 film Get Crazy. He appeared in the Tales from the Darkside episode "The Deal" (1988).

== Personal life and death ==
For a year after his father's death and in tribute to him, Allen used his family name, Goorwitz, for his screen credits.

When Garfield suffered a stroke before filming his role in The Ninth Gate (1999), director Roman Polanski opted to use Garfield's paralyzed face for his character rather than conceal it or recast the role. Garfield suffered another massive stroke in 2004 and thereafter was a long-term nursing care resident at the Motion Picture & Television Country House and Hospital in Woodland Hills, California, where he died of complications related to COVID-19 and his previous strokes on April 7, 2020, at age 80.

== Filmography ==
| Year | Title | Role | Notes | Ref. |
|---|---|---|---|---|
| 1968 | Orgy Girls '69 | | | |
| 1968 | Greetings | Smut Peddler | | |
| 1969 | Putney Swope | Elias, Jr. | | |
| 1970 | The Good, the Bad and the Beautiful | Moreno | | |
| 1970 | Hi, Mom! | Joe Banner | | |
| 1970 | The Owl and the Pussycat | Dress Shop Proprietor | | |
| 1971 | Roommates | Martin Axborough | | |
| 1971 | Taking Off | Norman | | |
| 1971 | Bananas | Man on Cross | | |
| 1971 | Cry Uncle! | Jake Masters | | |
| 1971 | You've Got to Walk It Like You Talk It or You'll Lose That Beat | Herby Moss | | |
| 1971 | The Organization | Benjy | | |
| 1971 | Believe in Me | Stutter | | |
| 1972 | Top of the Heap | Taxi Driver | | |
| 1972 | The Candidate | Klein | | |
| 1972 | Get to Know Your Rabbit | Vic | | |
| 1973 | Slither | Vincent J. Palmer | | |
| 1973 | Deadhead Miles | Juicy Brucey | Uncredited | |
| 1974 | Busting | Carl Rizzo | | |
| 1974 | The Conversation | Bernie Moran | | |
| 1974 | The Front Page | Kruger | | |
| 1975 | Nashville | Barnett | | |
| 1976 | The Commitment | | | |
| 1976 | Gable and Lombard | Louis B. Mayer | | |
| 1976 | Mother, Jugs, and Speed | Harry Fishbine | | |
| 1976 | Paco | Padre | | |
| 1978 | Skateboard | Manny Bloom | | |
| 1978 | The Brink's Job | Vinnie Costa | | |
| 1979 | Sketches of a Strangler | Jack Garvey | | |
| 1979 | Fyre | Preacher | | |
| 1980 | The Stunt Man | Sam | | |
| 1980 | One Trick Pony | Cal van Damp | | |
| 1981 | Continental Divide | Howard McDermott | | |
| 1982 | One from the Heart | Restaurant Owner | | |
| 1982 | Der Stand der Dinge | Gordon | | |
| 1983 | The Black Stallion Returns | Kurr | | |
| 1983 | Get Crazy | Max Wolfe | | |
| 1984 | Irreconcilable Differences | Phil Hanner | | |
| 1984 | Teachers | Carl Rosenberg | | |
| 1984 | The Cotton Club | Abbadabba Berman | | |
| 1986 | Desert Bloom | Mr. Mosol | | |
| 1986 | Sins | Adam Gore | | |
| 1987 | Beverly Hills Cop II | Harold Lutz | | |
| 1987 | My Best Friend's Birthday | Entertainment Magnate | | |
| 1989 | Night Visitor | Zachary Willard | | |
| 1989 | Let It Ride | Greenberg | | |
| 1990 | Dick Tracy | Reporter #1 | | |
| 1990 | Club Fed | Harrison Farnsworth IV | | |
| 1991 | Until the End of the World | Gebrauchtwagenhändler | | |
| 1992 | Miracle Beach | Magnus O'Leary | | |
| 1992 | Jack and His Friends | Jack | | |
| 1993 | Family Prayers | Cantor | | |
| 1993 | Cyborg 2 | Martin Dunn | | |
| 1994 | The Patriots | Eagleman | | |
| 1995 | Stuart Saves His Family | Maitre D' | | |
| 1995 | Wild Side | Dan Rackman | | |
| 1995 | Destiny Turns on the Radio | Vinnie Vidivici | | |
| 1996 | Diabolique | Leo Katzman | | |
| 1997 | Obsession | Simon Frischmuth | | |
| 1997 | The Elf Who Didn't Believe | Twisp | | |
| 1998 | Get a Job | Mr. Berger / Psychiatrist | | |
| 1999 | The Ninth Gate | Witkin | | |
| 2001 | The Majestic | Leo Kubelsky | | |
| 2002 | White Boy | Mr. Rosen | | |
| 2016 | Chief Zabu | Ben Sydney | Final film role; filmed in 1986 | |

== Television ==
| Year | Title | Role | Notes |
|---|---|---|---|
| 1971 | The Mod Squad | Charles Weaver | Episode: "Welcome to Our City" |
| 1971 | The Young Lawyers | Bernie Yoakum | Episode: "The Whimper of Whipped Dogs" |
| 1971 | Bonanza | Charlie | Episode: "The Iron Butterfly" |
| 1972 | McCloud | Ralphie | Episode: "A Little Plot at Tranquil Valley" |
| 1972 | Search | Marty Zackarian | Episode: "One of Our Probes is Missing" |
| 1972 | Banyon | Henry Spear | Episode: "A Date with Death" |
| 1972 | Love, American Style | Gork | Segment: "Love and the First Kiss" |
| 1973 | The Bob Newhart Show | The Manager | Episode: "Let's Get Away from It Almost" |
| 1973 | Kojak | Mario Portello | Pilot film: "The Marcus-Nelson Murders" |
| 1973 | Adam's Rib | Attinger | Episode: "The Unwritten Law" |
| 1973 | Ironside | Baxter Flynn | Episode: "Double-Edged Corner" |
| 1975 | Rhoda | David Bloom | Episode: "Strained Interlude" |
| 1975 | Gunsmoke | Henry DeCory | Episode: "The Fires of Ignorance" |
| 1975 | Kate McShane | Marty Goodman | Episode: "Accounts Receivable" |
| 1976 | McCoy | J. Carter Sloan | Episode: "In Again, Out Again" |
| 1976 | Serpico | The Professor/Redman | 2 episodes |
| 1980 | Trapper John, M.D. | Brody (as Allen Goorwitz) | Episode: "Warning: I May Be Hazardous to You Health" |
| 1982 | Taxi | Mr. Ratledge (as Allen Goorwitz) | Episode: "Crime and Punishment" |
| 1983 | Lottery! | (as Allen Goorwitz) | Episode: "Being a Winner" |
| 1986 | Sins | Adam Gore (as Allen Goorwitz) | Miniseries |
| 1987 | The Magical World of Disney | Howie | Episode: "You Ruined My Life" |
| 1988 | Tales from the Darkside | Donald/Kingsley Diamond/Michael Rudnick/The Devil | Episode: "The Deal" |
| 1990 | Matlock | Detective Richard Cox | Episode: "The Informer" |
| 1991 | Equal Justice | Sam (uncredited) | Episode: "In Confidence" |
| 1991 | Stat | | Episode: "The Wilding" |
| 1991 | Eddie Dodd | Benny Schaeffer | Episode: "Welcome Home" |
| 1991 | Palace Guard | Sy Hertzog | 4 episode |
| 1992 | Law & Order | Carl Berg | Episode: "Vengeance" |
| 1992 | Citizen Cohn | Abe Feller | TV film |
| 1993 | Jack's Place | Tommy | Episode: "Play It Again, Jack" |
| 1994-1995 | Chicago Hope | Dr. Raymond Kadalski | 4 episodes |
| 1997 | Michael Hayes | Donal Morris | Episode: "The Doctor's Tale" |
| 1998 | Dharma & Greg | Stan Gottlieb | Episode: "Do You Want Fries With That?" |
| 1999 | The Lot | Harry Sylva | 3 episodes |
| 2000 | Sports Night | Chuck "Cut Man" Kimmel | Episode: "The Cut Man Cometh" |
| 2000 | The West Wing | Roger Becker | Episode: "In the Shadow of Two Gunmen: Part II" |
