= Munchies (film) =

1987 comedy horror film

- DVD cover
- Directed by: Bettina Hirsch
- Written by: Lance Smith
- Produced by: Roger Corman
- Starring: Harvey Korman; Charlie Stratton; Nadine Van der Velde
- Music by: Ernest Troost
- Distributed by: New Concorde
- Release date: March 1987
- Running time: 83 minutes
- Country: United States
- Language: English

Munchies is a 1987 comedy horror film starring Harvey Korman, Charlie Stratton, and Nadine Van der Velde. Directed by Tina Hirsch, the film editor for Gremlins, the film features a similar plotline. Munchies was followed by Munchie in 1992.

== Plot ==
Space archaeologist Simon Watterman, discovers a "Munchie" in a cave in Peru. Bringing the specimen back to the United States, Simon's son Paul and his girlfriend Cindy name it Arnold. Cecil Watterman, Simon's evil twin brother and snack food entrepreneur, kidnaps Arnold while Cindy and Paul are making out.

When Arnold is hurt by his kidnappers, it becomes aggressive and attacks Cecil's adopted son. Attempting to kill Arnold, they chop him into quarters, but instead of dying, Arnold multiplies into four new Munchies. The quartet of creatures develop a love of women, attacking people, beer, and junk food in the process.

Eddie is incapacitated by the Munchies as they turn their attention on Cindy and chase her through the Calsnax storage facility, but she hides from them in a shed. The Munchies begin operating the machinery and use it to cut themselves into pieces, multiplying themselves further, but Paul electrifies the assembly line with a cable, turning them to stone. He proceeds to destroy their petrified remains and Cindy reveals herself from hiding, but as they are reunited, a lone Munchie presumed to be Arnold attacks Paul. They are able to fight Arnold off and turn the Munchie to stone by electrocution, but do not destroy it since Paul wants to keep it intact for Simon's evidence.

Cecil, Melvis, and Big Ed are still trapped in the elevator, but they are released by Eddie. Paul discovers the illegal ingredients in Cecil's snacks who tries to bribe him into going along with the scheme but refuses Cecil's offer with a punch to the face. Big Ed arrests both Cecil and Melvis on the spot while Paul and the others depart.

As they return to the house with the Munchie statue, they are greeted by Simon and an enthused Dr. Crowder who offers them $25,000 for the statue, which they accept. Paul admits defeat in their bet and promises he will go to community college, but his father explains that the liquid sample analyzed from the temple was made up of unknown elements to earth and declares he has his new bestseller titled "Machu Picchu: Toxic Waste Dump of the Gods" and that Paul can pursue his comedy career in Los Angeles.

As Dr. Crowder drives off into the desert, ominous dark clouds circle overhead and lightning strikes the stone Munchie in the pickup bed. The voice of Arnold cries out "amigo” as the credits begin to roll, implying that the Munchie has been reanimated once again.

== Cast ==
- Harvey Korman as Cecil Watterman and Simon Watterman
- Charles Stratton as Paul Watterman
- Nadine Van der Velde as Cindy
- Alix Elias as Melvis Macintosh Watterman
- Charlie Phillips as Deputy Eddie
- Hardy Rawls as Sheriff Big Ed
- Jon Stafford as Dude
- Robert Picardo as Bob Marvelle
- Wendy Schaal as Marge Marvelle
- Scott Sherk as Buddy Holly
- Lori Birdsong as Terry
- Traci Huber-Sheridan as Amy
- Paul Bartel as Dr. Crowder
- Ellen Albertini Dow as Little Old Lady
- Jerado De Cordovier as Old Indian
- Roberto A. Jimenez as Ramon
- Chip Heller as Burgerland Manager
- Michael Lee Gogin as Burgerland Employee #1
- Larry Nicholas as Burgerland Employee #2
- Kevin Thompson as Burgerland Employee #3
- Justin Dreyfuss as Dwight
- Jan Kuljis as Biker Chick
- Paul Short as Head Biker
- Steven Bernstein as Dean
- Solly Marx, Janet Lee Orcutt, Carol Rees, and Harry Terzian as stunt drivers
- Helen Kelly as Girl at Dinner
- Carl Thibault as Miniature Golf Patron
- Frank Welker and Fred Newman as the Munchie voices

== Production ==
Tina Hirsch had edited three films for Roger Corman in the 1970s and in the mid-1980s told him that she wanted to direct. Corman wanted to make a Gremlins knock off, which were profitable at the time, and, since Hirsch had edited that film, it seemed a good fit. Munchies was shot over 12 days, followed by three days of filming puppets and inserts.
