= The Annihilators (film) =

1985 film

- Directed by: Charles E. Sellier Jr.
- Written by: Brian Russell
- Produced by: Thomas C. Chapman
- Starring: Jim Antonio; Sid Conrad
- Cinematography: Henning Schellerup
- Edited by: Dan Gross
- Music by: Bob Summers
- Distributed by: New World Pictures
- Release date: 1985
- Language: English

The Annihilators, also known just as Annihilators, is a 1985 American action film directed by Charles E. Sellier Jr. and starring Jim Antonio, Sid Conrad and Gerrit Graham.

== Cast ==
- Jim Antonio as Lieutenant Hawkins
- Sid Conrad as Louie Nace
- Gerrit Graham as Ray Track
- Lawrence Hilton-Jacobs as Garrett Floyd
- Paul Koslo as Roy "Roy Boy" Jagger
- Dennis Redfield as Joe Nace
- Christopher Stone as Bill
- Andy Wood as Woody
- Bruce Evers as Jesse
- Millie Fisher as Marie
- Tom Harper as "Doc"
