= Hi, Mom! =

1970 film by Brian De Palma

- Theatrical release poster
- Directed by: Brian De Palma
- Screenplay by: Brian De Palma
- Story by: Charles Hirsch; Brian De Palma
- Produced by: Charles Hirsch
- Starring: Robert De Niro; Jennifer Salt; Gerrit Graham; Ruth Alda; Allen Garfield
- Cinematography: Robert Elfstrom
- Edited by: Paul Hirsch
- Music by: Eric Kaz
- Production company: West End Films
- Distributed by: Sigma III
- Release date: April 27, 1970
- Running time: 87 minutes
- Country: United States
- Language: English
- Budget: ~$100,000
- Box office: $1.2 million

Hi, Mom! is a 1970 American black comedy film written and directed by Brian De Palma, and is one of Robert De Niro's earliest films. De Niro reprises his role of Jon Rubin from Greetings (1968). In this film, Rubin is a fledgling "adult filmmaker" who has an idea to post cameras at his window and film his neighbors.

== Plot ==
Vietnam veteran and aspiring filmmaker Jon Rubin is hired by producer Joe Banner to make a pornographic film. Rubin, who has been spying on his neighbor Judy Bishop, uses the opportunity to seduce her and secretly film them having sexual intercourse using a camera mounted on his apartment window. The camera tilts during filming, however, spoiling the results, and the displeased Banner withdraws his offer.

Rubin joins an experimental acting troupe headed by another of his neighbors. The troupe mounts a production called Be Black, Baby!. A group of white theater patrons attend a performance by the troupe. First, they are forced to eat soul food. The white audience is also subjected to wearing shoe polish on their faces, while the African American actors sport whiteface and terrorize the people in blackface. The white audience members attempt to escape from the building but are ambushed in the elevator by the troupe. As two of the Black actors rape one of the white audience members, Rubin arrives in the character of an NYPD policeman and arrests members of the white audience under the pretense that they are Black. The sequence concludes with a thoroughly battered and abused audience raving about the show on public television.

Rubin decides to remain in the city and stay with the troupe. He marries Judy and finds work as an insurance salesman. Rubin soon plants a bomb in the building where he lives with Judy, demolishing it. He watches the devastation from the street and speaks to a TV reporter.

== Cast ==
- Robert De Niro as Jon Rubin
- Jennifer Salt as Judy Bishop
- Gerrit Graham as Gerrit Wood
- Ruth Alda as Audience Member
- Allen Garfield as Joe Banner
- Charles Durning as Superintendent
- Lara Parker as Jeannie Mitchell
- Bruce D. Price as Jimmy Mitchell
- Ricky Parker as Ricky Mitchell
- Andy Parker as Andy Mitchell
- Paul Bartel as Uncle Tom Wood
- Bettina Kugel as Journal Member
- Floyd L. Peterson as John Winnicove
- Paul Hirsch as Avery Gunnz

== Production ==
Jennifer Salt and Charles Durning would both work with Brian De Palma on his suspense thriller Sisters (1973). Appearing in a supporting role is Paul Bartel.

== Release ==
According to the 1972 book The Movie Rating Game by Stephen Farber, the film was originally given an X rating by the Motion Picture Association of America (MPAA), but after a few minor trims, it was approved for an R. The main cut occurred during the scene in which Gerrit Wood (Gerrit Graham) paints his entire body for the Be Black, Baby! performance. He hesitated for a moment about painting his penis, but finally finished the job. The actual painting of the penis was deleted to obtain the R.

Hi, Mom! was released on home video by MGM Home Entertainment. Arrow Video released the film on Blu-ray Disc on December 11, 2018 as part of a collection titled De Niro & De Palma The Early Films, which also included The Wedding Party and Greetings. Hi, Mom! was released on Ultra HD Blu-ray on May 19, 2026 by Radiance Films with De Palma’s other 1970 film Dionysus in '69 included as an extra.

=== Critical reception ===
Roger Greenspun of The New York Times wrote that the film "stands out for its wit, its ironic good humor, its multilevel sophistications, its technical ingenuity, its nervousness, and its very special ability to bring the sensibility of the suburbs to the sins of the inner city". Variety stated that the film "is three-fourths of a funny, engaging serio-comedy about a 'peep art' filmmaker and urban guerrilla in New York. Unfortunately, the fourth that fails is the finale which literally and figuratively flops, leaving the audience with a creative promise unfulfilled." Kevin Thomas of the Los Angeles Times wrote, "Satire is a naturally attractive form of expression for young film-makers, but few display the degree of sustained humor, energy and control that De Palma did in Greetings and now even more so in the farther-ranging Hi, Mom! Indeed, his ability to fuse hilarity and anger, spontaneity and discipline, is nothing short of brilliant."

== See also ==
- List of American films of 1970
- List of films featuring surveillance
