= Greetings (1968 film) =

1968 film by Brian De Palma

- Theatrical release poster
- Directed by: Brian De Palma
- Written by: Charles Hirsch; Brian De Palma
- Produced by: Charles Hirsch
- Starring: Robert De Niro; Jonathan Warden; Gerrit Graham; Richard Hamilton; Megan McCormick; Bettina Kugel; Jack Cowley; Jane Lee Salmons; Ashley Oliver; Allen Garfield; Roz Kelly
- Cinematography: Robert Fiore
- Edited by: Brian De Palma
- Music by: Eric Kaz; J. Steven Soles; Artie Traum
- Production company: West End Films
- Distributed by: Sigma III
- Release date: December 15, 1968
- Running time: 88 minutes
- Country: United States
- Language: English
- Budget: $39,000

Greetings is a 1968 American black comedy film co-written and directed by Brian De Palma. A satirical film about men avoiding the Vietnam War draft, it marks Robert De Niro's first major role.

It is the first American film to receive an X rating by the Motion Picture Association of America (MPAA), although it was later given an R rating. However, contrary to some allegations, it was not the first film to receive an X-rating in the United States; the first film to hold an X-rating in the country was in fact French-British film The Girl on a Motorcycle (also known as Naked Under Leather).

De Niro reprised the character of Jon Rubin in the 1970 film Hi, Mom!, also directed by De Palma. The film was entered into the 19th Berlin International Film Festival, where it won a Silver Bear award.

== Plot ==
Three friends, Paul Shaw, Lloyd Clay, and Jon Rubin, explore free love, the John F. Kennedy assassination, the Vietnam War and amateur filmmaking.

== Cast ==
- Robert De Niro as Jon Rubin
- Jonathan Warden as Paul Shaw
- Gerrit Graham as Lloyd Clay
- Richard Hamilton as Pop Artist
- Megan McCormick as Marina
- Bettina Kugel as Tina
- Jack Cowley as Fashion Photographer
- Jane Lee Salmons as Model
- Ashley Oliver as Bronx Secretary
- Melvin Morgulis as Rat Vendor
- Cynthia Peltz as Divorcee
- Peter Maloney as Earl Roberts
- Ruth Alda as Linda
- Ted Lescault as Bookstore Manager
- Mona Feit as Mystic
- M. Dobish as TV Cameraman
- Richard Landis as Ex-G.I.
- Carol Patton as Blonde in Park
- Allen Garfield as Smut Peddler
- Sara-Jo Edlin as Nymphomaniac
- Roz Kelly as Photographer
- Ray Tuttle as TV News Correspondent
- Tisa Chiang as Vietnamese Girl

== Release ==
Arrow Video released the film on Blu-ray Disc on December 11, 2018 as part of a collection titled De Niro & De Palma The Early Films, which also included The Wedding Party and Hi, Mom!

=== Critical reception ===
Greetings holds an 88% rating on Rotten Tomatoes, based on 17 reviews with a mean if 6.1 of a possible 10.

Howard Thompson of The New York Times wrote, "Some of it is amusing, as when one of the lads is coached in the technique of draft-dodging. Most of it is strained and unfunny, with some generous nudity for nudity's sake and a hip sprinkling of four-letter words." Variety wrote that the film "has its sluggish sequences" but "[m]uch of the production has a freshness that is infectious". Kevin Thomas of the Los Angeles Times called it "the funniest film since The Producers—and stylistically is its superior. It has the fresh and uninhibited wit of the best of the student films yet has the grace and control to sustain itself throughout its 88 minutes." Roger Ebert of the Chicago Sun-Times awarded the film three stars out of four, and wrote, "What holds the film together is not its plot (there isn't one) but its attitude, its general instinct for what is funny in our society."

== See also ==
- List of American films of 1968
