= Sisters (1972 film) =

1972 film by Brian De Palma

- Theatrical release poster
- Directed by: Brian De Palma
- Screenplay by: Brian De Palma; Louisa Rose
- Story by: Brian De Palma
- Produced by: Edward R. Pressman
- Starring: Margot Kidder; Jennifer Salt; Charles Durning; Bill Finley; Lisle Wilson
- Cinematography: Gregory Sandor
- Edited by: Paul Hirsch
- Music by: Bernard Herrmann
- Production company: Pressman-Williams Enterprises
- Distributed by: American International Pictures
- Release dates: November 18, 1972 (Filmex); April 18, 1973 (United States)
- Running time: 92 minutes
- Country: United States
- Languages: English; French
- Budget: $500,000
- Box office: $1 million (US/Canada rentals)

Sisters is a 1972 American neo-noir psychological horror film directed by Brian De Palma and starring Margot Kidder, Jennifer Salt, Charles Durning, William Finley, and Lisle Wilson. It follows Dominique Blanchion, the separated conjoined twin of a French-Canadian model, Danielle Breton, who is suspected of having committed a brutal murder witnessed by Grace Collier, a newspaper reporter in Staten Island, New York City.

Co-written by De Palma and Louisa Rose, the screenplay for the film was inspired by the Soviet conjoined twins Masha and Dasha Krivoshlyapova and features narrative and visual references to several films by Alfred Hitchcock. Filmed on location in Staten Island, the film prominently features split-screen compositions (also present in subsequent De Palma films such as Carrie), and was scored by frequent Hitchcock collaborator Bernard Herrmann.

Sisters premiered at Filmex in Los Angeles on November 18, 1972, before being released theatrically on April 18, 1973 by American International Pictures. It was praised by critics, who noted its adept performances and use of homage. It was the first of a series of shocking thrillers for De Palma, and, in the years after its release, became a cult film.

== Plot ==
Advertising manager Philip Woode wins dinner for two at a Manhattan restaurant on a Candid Camera-style television show. Danielle Breton, a young French-Canadian model and aspiring actress who was part of the prank, flirts with Philip and he agrees to take her as his date. After dinner, they retire to her Staten Island apartment to have sex. The next morning, Danielle tells Philip that Dominique, her identical twin sister, has come to celebrate their birthday. At her request, he goes to the drug store to refill a prescription and picks up a birthday cake at a bakery on his way back. When he returns, he is stabbed to death by the crazed Dominique. Before he dies, he tries to alert a neighbor in the apartment across the way by writing "help" in his own blood on a window.

The neighbor, a reporter named Grace Collier, calls the police. Meanwhile, Danielle's ex-husband Emil helps her clean up and hide Philip's body by folding it inside a sofa bed. Grace accompanies the skeptical Detective Kelly and his partner on a search of Danielle's apartment, but Danielle insists that she has been alone since the previous night. Certain that Danielle is hiding the murderer, Grace persuades her editor to let her investigate the story on the basis that the police are ignoring her because Philip was black. She hires Joseph Larch, a private investigator, to gain access to the apartment. He determines that the couch contains Philip's body. He also finds a thick file from the Loisel Institute on the Blanchion Twins, Canada's first conjoined twins. Grace's own investigations uncover that the twins were separated only recently, and that Dominique apparently died during the operation.

As Larch pursues the truck that Emil called to haul the couch away, Grace tails Emil and Danielle to a remote mental hospital. When she is caught, Emil convinces the staff that she is a new patient. He sedates and hypnotizes Grace and places Danielle on the bed beside her, who is revealed to be barren due to an incident that Danielle refuses to talk about. Emil promises to "tell her everything": revelations that play out in a monochrome sequence in which Grace, in her drugged state, hallucinates herself to be Dominique.

Danielle and Dominique were orphaned conjoined twins. As adults, the shy, timid Dominique quickly became a burden to the more outgoing Danielle, who was married to Emil. After several sexual encounters, where Dominique is drugged unconscious against her will by Emil at Danielle's request so that the couple are uninterrupted, Danielle becomes pregnant with his child. Dominique snaps after finding out that her sister is pregnant and stabs her in the stomach to kill her fetus. Emil arranges for a surgeon to separate Dominique from Danielle, the latter of whom is now badly bleeding from the wound that has also left her barren. However, Dominique dies during the procedure, much to Danielle's horror. This causes Danielle to snap and create a split personality representing her sister. Whenever Danielle has a sexual experience, the violent "Dominique" personality takes over. The pills she took kept Dominique at bay.

Emil kisses Danielle passionately to bring forth "Dominique" so he can question her, but she slashes him in the groin with a scalpel and he bleeds to death. Grace awakens to find the sorrowful Danielle tenderly embracing Emil's bloody body and screams in horror. Detective Kelly arrests Danielle, who denies knowledge of the murders and says that her sister is dead. Kelly interviews Grace, who is still under Emil's hypnotic spell, repeating lines that he fed her to deny there was a murder. However, Larch tracks the sofa to a remote railway station in Canada.

== Cast ==
- Margot Kidder as Danielle Breton / Dominique Blanchion
- Jennifer Salt as Grace Collier
- Charles Durning as Joseph Larch
- William Finley (credited as Bill Finley) as Emil Breton
- Lisle Wilson as Phillip Woode
- Barnard Hughes as Arthur McLennen
- Mary Davenport as Mrs. Peyson Collier
- Dolph Sweet as Detective Kelly
- Catherine Gaffigan as Arlene (uncredited)
- Justine Johnston as Elaine D'Anna (uncredited)
- Olympia Dukakis as Louise Wilanski (uncredited)

== Analysis ==
Scholarly discussion of Sisters has centered largely on its prevalent theme of voyeurism as well as a perceived commentary on the women's liberation movement. Film critic and scholar Robin Wood wrote that the film "analyzes the ways in which women are oppressed within patriarchy society on two levels, the professional (Grace) and the psychosexual (Danielle/Dominique)." He adds: "If the monster is defined as that which threatens normality, it follows that the monster of Sisters is Grace as well as Danielle/Dominique–a point the film acknowledges in a cinematic hallucination/flashback sequence wherein Grace becomes Dominique... Simply, one can define the monster of Sisters as women's liberation."

The prominent allusions to works by Alfred Hitchcock have also been noted by critics such as Bruce Kawin, who wrote in 2000:

Sisters... makes intelligent reference to Rope (1948), Rear Window (1954), Psycho (1960), and even The Cabinet of Dr. Caligari (1920). The film ends with a shot of a detective looking through binoculars at what might be called the scene of the crime, intently but fruitlessly watching a couch that no one will ever incriminate themselves with by picking up. From start to finish, Sisters is charged with scenes of looking—from seeing a murder through a window to seeing another person's memories in one's own mind.

== Production ==
=== Development ===
Brian De Palma was inspired to write the screenplay for Sisters after reading an article in Life magazine in 1966 about the lives of the Soviet conjoined twins Masha and Dasha Krivoshlyapova:

At the end of the article there was a picture of the two girls sitting on a couch and the caption said that apart from the fact that they were joined at the hip both girls were physiologically normal, but as they were getting older they were developing psychological problems. One of the twins had a very surly, disturbing look on her face and the other looked perfectly healthy and smiling. And this strong visual image started the whole idea off in my mind.

The script, which De Palma co-wrote with Louisa Rose, features structural elements inspired by Hitchcock, such as killing off a prominent character early into the film, alternating points of view, and the involvement of a third party observer in solving a crime. In writing the exposition of the film which details the twins' history and institutionalization, De Palma was influenced by Roman Polanski's Rosemary's Baby (1968), specifically the scene in which Rosemary is raped and conceives her child.

=== Filming ===
Sisters was shot over a period of eight weeks in New York City in spring 1972, primarily in the borough of Staten Island. The apartment interiors were filmed on a set, with additional exterior photography of the Time-Life Building in Manhattan. The film was shot using Mitchell BNC cameras with Panavision lenses. According to De Palma, the film was lit with a "truly classical style", with scenes sometimes taking 45 minutes to set up. Some sequences were shot on 16 mm film by De Palma himself, such as the scene in which Emil Breton (William Finley) speaks directly to the camera during the finale's hallucination sequence.

=== Visual style ===
The film uses unusual point of view shots and split screen effects to show two events happening simultaneously, as well as long tracking shots, some in excess of six minutes in length. The extended tracking shot in Danielle Breton (Margot Kidder)'s apartment following the murder of Phillip Woode (Lisle Wilson) was influenced by Max Ophüls and directly references Hitchcock's Rope. The theme of voyeurism is represented in the alternating points-of-view and distortions of perspective within the narrative diegesis; De Palma commented: "I really got the idea from watching the Vietnam war on television – watching a war that nobody really knew about except that we watched it every night on the 7 o'clock news. It was really a very voyeuristic war, and I think it says a lot about the way we perceive things. We are very much controlled by the media which present things to us. And those can be manipulated."

In order to accomplish the image of both twins conjoined onscreen in the film's finale (both played by Kidder), De Palma had Kidder photographed seated in two different positions, and then joined the images together via optical editing.

=== Musical score ===
While editing the film in post-production, editor Paul Hirsch and De Palma listened to musical scores by Bernard Herrmann (particularly for Psycho, Marnie, and Vertigo) and played them along with the film's key scenes. This led to De Palma inquiring about Herrmann composing the film's musical score. At the time Herrmann was semi-retired, but admired the screenplay enough to agree to score the film.

== Release ==
Sisters had its world premiere at Filmex in Los Angeles on November 18, 1972. It was released theatrically in the United States by American International Pictures, opening in Los Angeles on April 18, 1973. It would later expand, opening in New York City on September 26, 1973, where it received "rave reviews", and continued to screen into November 9, 1973. It was also selected for the 33rd Venice International Film Festival in 1975.

In the United Kingdom, the film was released under the alternate title Blood Sisters.

=== Home media ===
Sisters was released on VHS and Betamax videocassettes by Warner Home Video in the 1980s, and again in 2000 by Homevision. The film was released on DVD by The Criterion Collection on October 3, 2000 in a new widescreen digital transfer. On July 16, 2018, Criterion announced a Blu-ray release of the film featuring a new 4K transfer which released on October 23, 2018.

== Reception ==
=== Box office ===
The film grossed $1 million in theatrical rentals in the United States and Canada.

=== Critical response ===
==== Contemporaneous ====
The film was met with critical praise; Roger Ebert noted that the film was "made more or less consciously as an homage to Alfred Hitchcock", but said it "has a life of its own" and praised the performances of both Kidder and Jennifer Salt. Vincent Canby of The New York Times called it "a good, substantial horror film" and stated "De Palma reveals himself here to be a first-rate director of more or less conventional material", also noting the film's references to Repulsion (1965) and Psycho (1960). Meanwhile, Variety, while stating it was "a good psychological murder melo-drama", said that "Brian De Palma's direction emphasizes exploitation values which do not fully mask script weakness." The Los Angeles Times's Kevin Thomas praised it as a "witty homage to Hitchcock" and a "low budget but high style scare show," as well as praising the performances and musical score. George McKinnon of The Boston Globe was less laudatory, writing: "It is difficult to determine what De Palma had in mind in this morbid horror film. Did he intend it all as a parody or a straightforward Psycho-type movie? ... If it is to be taken as a tongue-in-cheek romp, it doesn't work and if meant as a horror film it is run-of-the-mill."

The film received honors from the U.S. Film Festival in Dallas, Texas, on April 13, 1973. Kidder also received an award for Best Actress at the Atlanta International Film Festival.

==== Retrospective ====
Critical reassessment of the film in the 21st century has largely been favorable, with critic Robin Wood writing in 2003 that Sisters was "one of the great American films of the '70s," while G. Allen Johnson of the San Francisco Chronicle considers it a key film in Kidder's career. Richard Brody wrote of the film in The New Yorker in 2016:

De Palma weaves his own obsession with movies into the dramatic fabric of Sisters by means of a scene involving a documentary about the twins that Grace views in the offices of Life magazine; this film-within-a-film becomes embedded in her unconscious mind and threatens to warp her consciousness as well. Though De Palma's own images can't rival Hitchcock's in shot-by-shot psychological power, the intricate multiple-perspective split-screen sequences of Sisters offer a dense and elaborate counterpoint that conjures a sense of psychological dislocation and information overload belonging to De Palma's own generation and times.

In 2016, Justin Chang of the Los Angeles Times ranked the film as De Palma's most underrated of the 1970s, writing that "for all its low-budget creakiness, [it] feels fully formed—from its sly opening bit of misdirection to its adroit use of split-screen to its memorably churning Bernard Herrmann score. De Palma's choice of subject matter couldn't have been more appropriate: With this film he effectively conjoined himself to Hitchcock, announcing himself as a skillful mimic with a mischievous side all his own." On the review aggregator website Rotten Tomatoes, 86% of 50 critics' reviews are positive. The website's consensus reads: "Clever yet clearly indebted to the masters of the genre, Sisters offers an early glimpse of De Palma at his stylishly crafty peak." Metacritic, which uses a weighted average, assigned the film a score of 70 out of 100, based on 16 critics, indicating "generally favorable" reviews.

== Remake ==
The film was remade in 2006 under the same title, with Lou Doillon, Stephen Rea, and Chloë Sevigny in the leading roles.

== See also ==
- List of American films of 1972

== Sources ==
- Armstrong, Kent Byron (2003). Slasher Films: An International Filmography, 1960 Through 2001. Jefferson, North Carolina: McFarland & Company. ISBN 978-0-786-41462-8.
- Bliss, Michael (1983). Brian De Palma. Scarecrow Filmmakers Series. Lanham, Maryland: Scarecrow Press. ISBN 978-0-810-81621-3.
- Donahue, Suzanne Mary (1987). American Film Distribution: The Changing Marketplace. Ann Arbor, Michigan: UMI Research Press. ISBN 978-0-835-71776-2.
- Rubinstein, Richard (2003) [1973]. "The Making of 'Sisters': An Interview with Brian De Palma". Interviews: Brian De Palma. Jackson, Mississippi: University Press of Mississippi. pp. 3–14. ISBN 978-1-578-06516-5.
- Wood, Robin (2003). Hollywood from Vietnam to Reagan... and Beyond. New York: Columbia University Press. ISBN 978-0-231-50757-8.
