= Brian De Palma =

American filmmaker (born 1940)

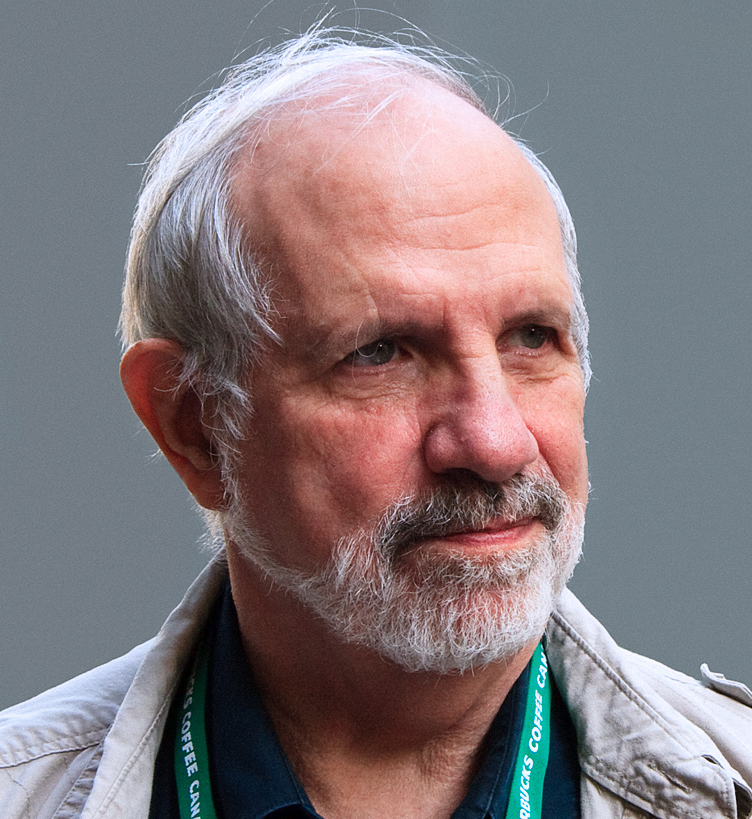
- De Palma in 2009
- Born: Brian Russell De Palma; September 11, 1940 (age 86); Newark, New Jersey, U.S.
- Education: Columbia University; Sarah Lawrence College (MA)
- Occupations: Film director; producer; screenwriter
- Years active: 1960–present
- Works: Full list
- Spouses: Nancy Allen (m. 1979; div. 1984); Gale Anne Hurd (m. 1991; div. 1993); Darnell Gregorio (m. 1995; div. 1997)
- Children: 2, including Piper
- Relatives: Anthony F. DePalma (father)

Brian Russell De Palma ([de ˈpalma]; born September 11, 1940) is an American filmmaker. A major figure of the New Hollywood generation, he is best known for his work in the suspense, crime, and psychological thriller genres in a career spanning more than five decades.

De Palma became enraptured with filmmaking after seeing Citizen Kane (1941) and Vertigo (1958). After enrolling at Columbia University, he enrolled at the newly coed Sarah Lawrence College; once there, influences as various impressed upon De Palma the many styles and themes that would shape his work in the coming decades. Several of his first films (Note: These films are Greetings (1968), Hi, Mom! (1970), Sisters (1972), and Phantom of the Paradise (1974).) have become cult classics. He made his breakthrough with Carrie (1976), which was an adaptation of Stephen King's novel of the same name, and gained him prominence as a young filmmaker. De Palma has since enjoyed commercial success with The Fury (1978), Dressed to Kill (1980), The Untouchables (1987), and Mission: Impossible (1996), and made cult classics such as Scarface (1983), Carlito's Way (1992), and Femme Fatale (2002).

As a young director, De Palma dreamed of being the "American Jean-Luc Godard". His style is allusive: he paid homage to Alfred Hitchcock in Obsession (1976), Dressed to Kill, and Body Double (1984); Blow Out (1981) is based on Michelangelo Antonioni's Blowup (1966); and Scarface, his remake of Howard Hawks' 1932 film, is dedicated to Hawks and Ben Hecht. De Palma's work has been criticized for its violence and sexual content but has also been championed by American critics such as Roger Ebert and Pauline Kael. Carrie has been inducted into the National Film Registry by the Library of Congress. In 2015, he was interviewed about his work in a well-received documentary by Noah Baumbach.

== Early life and education ==
Brian Russell De Palma was born on September 11, 1940, in Newark, New Jersey, the youngest of three boys. His Italian-American parents, Vivienne (née Muti) and Anthony F. DePalma, an orthopedic surgeon, were from Alberona, in the Apulia region of Southern Italy. He has two older brothers, Barton and Bruce. Raised in Philadelphia, Pennsylvania and New Hampshire, De Palma attended various Protestant and Quaker schools, eventually graduating from Friends' Central School. He had a poor relationship with his father, and would secretly follow him to record his adulterous behavior; this would eventually inspire the teenage character in De Palma's Dressed to Kill (1980). When he was in high school, he built computers. He won a regional science-fair prize for his project "An Analog Computer to Solve Differential Equations".

Enrolled at Columbia University as a physics student, De Palma became enraptured with filmmaking after seeing Orson Welles' Citizen Kane (1941) and Alfred Hitchcock's Vertigo (1958). After receiving his undergraduate degree in 1962, De Palma enrolled at the newly coed Sarah Lawrence College as a graduate student in their theater department, earning an M.A. in the discipline in 1964 as one of the first male students in a predominantly female school. Once there, influences as various as drama teacher Wilford Leach, the Maysles brothers, Michelangelo Antonioni, Andy Warhol and Jean-Luc Godard, impressed upon De Palma the many styles and themes that would shape his work in the coming decades.

== Career ==
=== 1963–1976: Rise to prominence ===
An early association with a young Robert De Niro resulted in The Wedding Party. The film, co-written and co-directed with Wilford Leach and producer Cynthia Munroe, had been shot in 1963 but remained unreleased until 1969, when De Palma's star had risen sufficiently in the Greenwich Village filmmaking scene. De Niro was unknown at the time; the credits mistakenly display his name as "Robert Denero". The film is noteworthy for its invocation of silent film techniques and use of the jump-cut. De Palma followed this style with various small films for the NAACP and the Treasury Department.

During the 1960s, De Palma began making a living producing documentaries, notably The Responsive Eye (1966), about The Responsive Eye op-art exhibit curated by William Seitz for MoMA in 1965. In an interview with Joseph Gelmis from 1969, De Palma described the film as "very good and very successful. It's distributed by Pathe Contemporary and makes lots of money. I shot it in four hours, with synched sound. I had two other guys shooting people's reactions to the paintings, and the paintings themselves."

Dionysus in '69 (1969) was De Palma's other major documentary from this period. The film records the Performance Group's performance of Euripides' The Bacchae, starring, amongst others, De Palma regular William Finley. The play is noted for breaking traditional barriers between performers and audience. The film's most striking quality is its extensive use of the split-screen. De Palma recalls that he was "floored" by this performance upon first sight, and in 1973 recounts how he "began to try and figure out a way to capture it on film. I came up with the idea of split-screen, to be able to show the actual audience involvement, to trace the life of the audience and that of the play as they merge in and out of each other."

De Palma's most significant features from this decade are Greetings (1968) and Hi, Mom! (1970). Both films star De Niro and espouse a leftist revolutionary viewpoint in the spirit of the time. Greetings was entered into the 19th Berlin International Film Festival, where it won a Silver Bear award. His other major film from this period is the slasher comedy Murder a la Mod (1968), his feature-length directorial debut. Each of these films experiments with narrative and intertextuality, reflecting De Palma's stated intention to become the "American Godard".

In 1970, De Palma left New York for Hollywood at age thirty to make Get to Know Your Rabbit (1972), starring Orson Welles and Tommy Smothers. Making the film was a crushing experience for De Palma, as Smothers did not like many of De Palma's ideas. Here he made several small, studio and independently released films. Among them were the horror film Sisters (1972), the rock musical Phantom of the Paradise (1974) and Obsession (1976), a variation on theme of Alfred Hitchcock's Vertigo (1958) scored by Hitchcock's frequent collaborator Bernard Herrmann.

=== 1976–1979: Breakthrough and acclaim ===
In November 1976, De Palma released an adaptation of Stephen King's novel Carrie. Though some see the psychic thriller as De Palma's bid for a blockbuster, the project was in fact small, underfunded by United Artists, and well under the cultural radar during the early months of production, as King's novel was not yet a bestseller. De Palma gravitated toward the project and changed crucial plot elements based upon his own predilections. The cast was mostly young and relatively new, though Sissy Spacek and John Travolta had gained attention for previous work in, respectively, film and sitcoms. Carrie became De Palma's first genuine box-office success, garnering Spacek and Piper Laurie Oscar nominations for their performances. Pre-production for the film had coincided with the casting process for George Lucas' Star Wars, and many of the actors cast in De Palma's film had been earmarked as contenders for Lucas' movie, and vice versa. Its suspense sequences are buttressed by teen comedy tropes, and its use of split-screen, split-diopter and slow motion shots tell the story visually rather than through dialogue. As for Lucas' project, De Palma complained in an early viewing of Star Wars that the opening text crawl was poorly written and volunteered to help edit the text to a more concise and engaging form.

The financial and critical success of Carrie allowed De Palma to pursue more personal material. Alfred Bester's novel The Demolished Man had fascinated De Palma since the late 1950s and appealed to his background in mathematics and avant-garde storytelling. Its unconventional unfolding of plot (exemplified in its mathematical layout of dialogue) and its stress on perception have analogs in De Palma's filmmaking. He sought to adapt it numerous times, though the project would carry a substantial price tag, and has yet to appear on-screen (Steven Spielberg's 2002 adaptation of Philip K. Dick's Minority Report bears striking similarities to De Palma's visual style and some of the themes of The Demolished Man). The result of his experience with adapting The Demolished Man was the 1978 science fiction psychic thriller The Fury, starring Kirk Douglas, Carrie Snodgress, John Cassavetes and Amy Irving. The film was admired by Jean-Luc Godard, who featured a clip in his mammoth Histoire(s) du cinéma, and Pauline Kael, who championed both The Fury and De Palma. The film boasted a larger budget than Carrie, though the consensus view at the time was that De Palma was repeating himself, with diminishing returns.

=== 1980–1996: Established career ===
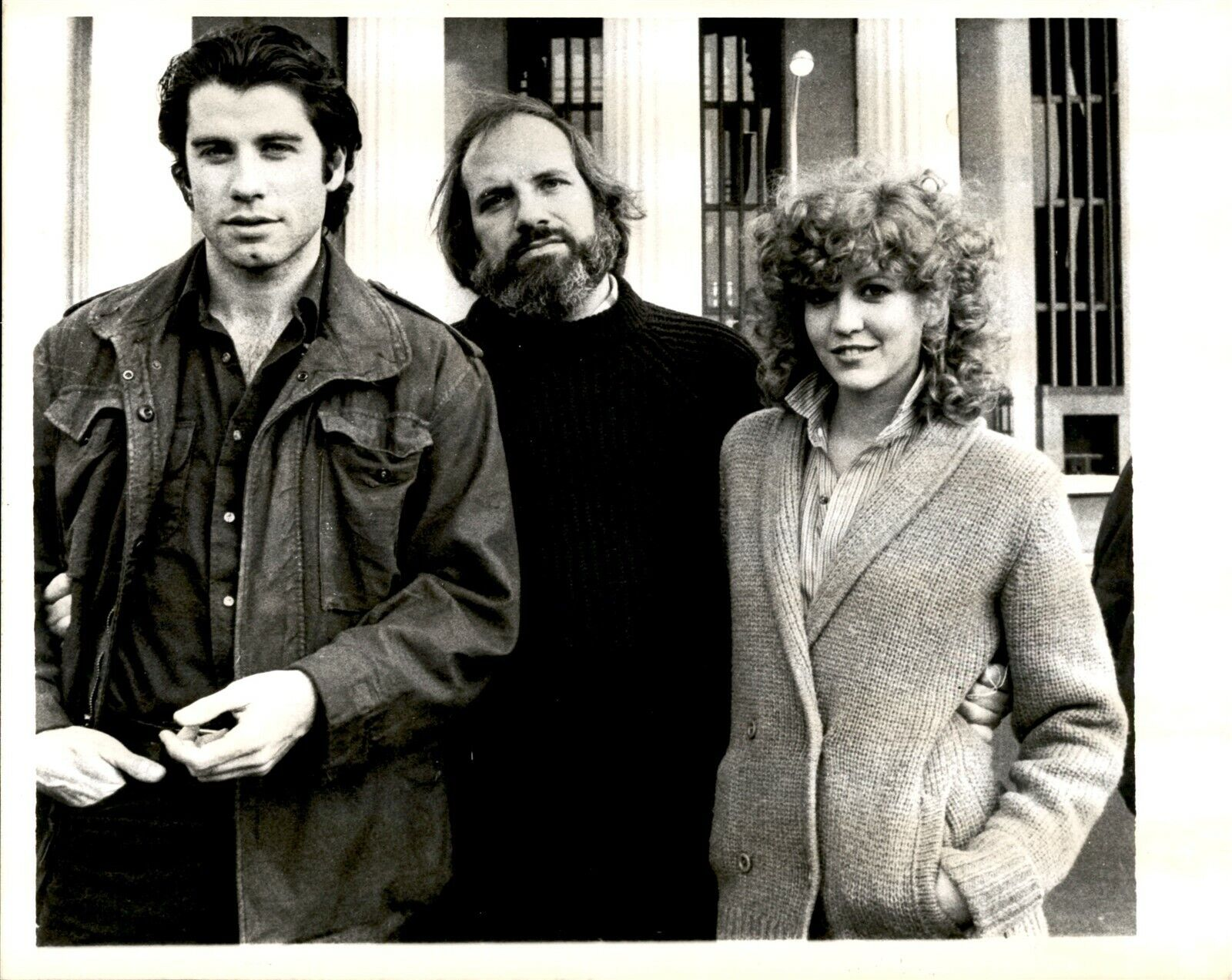
De Palma (center) with John Travolta and Nancy Allen in 1981, promoting Blow Out in Los Angeles

The 1980s were marked by some of De Palma's best known films, including the erotic thriller Dressed to Kill (1980) starring Michael Caine and Angie Dickinson. Although the film received critical acclaim, it caused controversy for its negative depiction of the transgender community. The following year he directed Blow Out (1981), a variation on Michelangelo Antonioni's Blow-Up (1966) and Francis Ford Coppola's The Conversation (1974). Blow Out starred John Travolta, Nancy Allen and John Lithgow and received critical acclaim. Kael wrote: "De Palma has sprung to the place that Robert Altman achieved with films such as McCabe & Mrs. Miller and Nashville and that Francis Ford Coppola reached with The Godfather films—that is, to the place where genre is transcended and what we're moved by is an artist's vision. It's a great movie."

De Palma directed Scarface (1983), a remake of Howard Hawks' 1932 film, starring Al Pacino and Michelle Pfeiffer with a screenplay by Oliver Stone. The film received mixed reviews with its negative depictions of ethnic stereotypes, as well as its violence and profanity. It has since been re-evaluated and is now considered a cult classic. The following year he made another erotic thriller, Body Double (1984), starring Craig Wasson and Melanie Griffith. The film also received mixed reviews but has since had a reassessment and found acclaim. De Palma directed the music video for Bruce Springsteen's single "Dancing in the Dark" the same year.

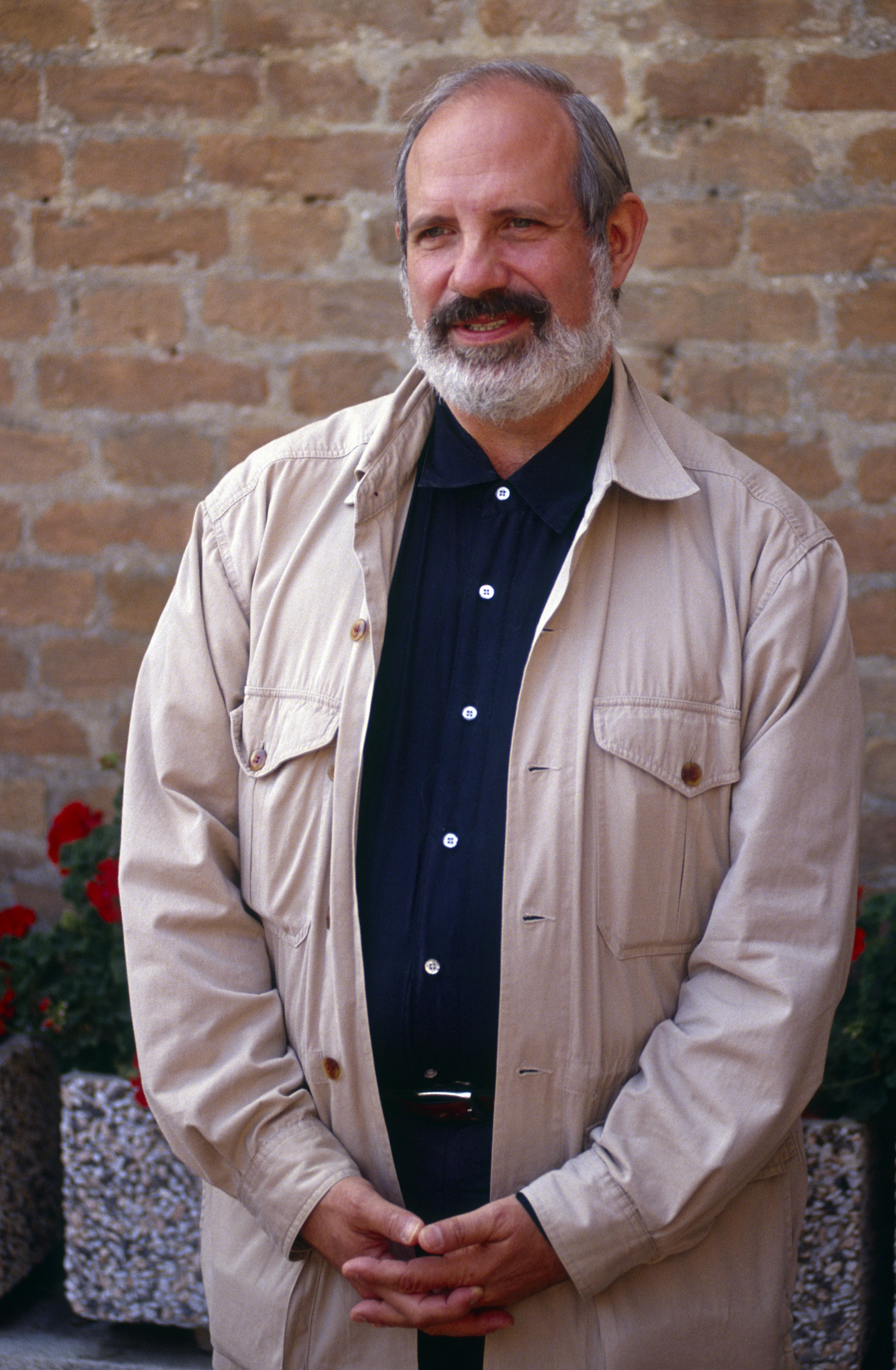
De Palma at the 1991 Venice Film Festival

In 1987, De Palma directed the crime film The Untouchables, loosely based on the book of the same name and adapted by David Mamet. The film stars Kevin Costner, Andy Garcia, Robert De Niro and Sean Connery, the last of whom won the Academy Award for Best Supporting Actor for the film. It received critical acclaim and box-office success. De Palma's Vietnam War film Casualties of War (1989) won critical praise but performed poorly in theatres and The Bonfire of the Vanities (1990) was a notorious failure with both critics and audiences. De Palma then had subsequent successes with Raising Cain (1992) and Carlito's Way (1993). Mission: Impossible (1996) was his highest-grossing film and started a successful franchise.

=== 1997–present: Recent work and career fluctuations ===
De Palma's work after Mission: Impossible has been less well received. His ensuing films Snake Eyes (1998), Mission to Mars (2000), and Femme Fatale (2002) all failed at the box office and received generally poor reviews, though Femme Fatale has since been revived in the eyes of many film critics and became a cult classic. His 2006 adaptation of The Black Dahlia was also unsuccessful and is currently the last movie De Palma has directed with backing from Hollywood.

A political controversy erupted over the portrayal of US soldiers in De Palma's 2007 film Redacted. Loosely based on the 2006 Mahmudiyah killings by American soldiers in Iraq, the film echoes themes that appeared in Casualties of War. Redacted received a limited release in the United States and grossed less than $1 million against a $5 million budget.

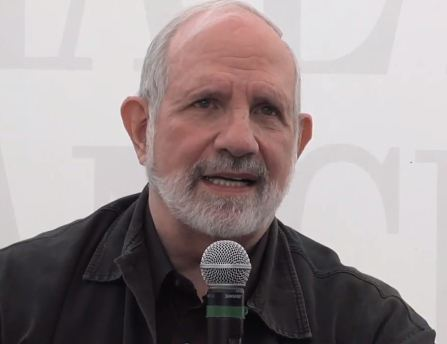
De Palma speaking in 2012

De Palma's output has slowed since the release of Redacted, with subsequent projects often falling into development hell, due mostly to creative differences. In 2012, his film Passion starring Rachel McAdams and Noomi Rapace was selected to compete for the Golden Lion at the 69th Venice International Film Festival but received mixed reviews and was financially unsuccessful.

De Palma's next project was the thriller Domino (2019), released two years after the film began production. It received generally negative reviews and was released direct-to-VOD in the United States, grossing less than half a million dollars internationally. De Palma has also expressed dissatisfaction with both the production of the film and the final result; "I never experienced such a horrible movie set."

In 2018, De Palma published his debut novel in France, Les serpents sont-ils nécessaires? (English translation: Are Snakes Necessary?), co-written with Susan Lehman. It was published in the U.S. in 2020. De Palma and Lehman also wrote a second book, currently unpublished, called Terry, based on one of De Palma's passion projects about a French film production making an adaptation of Thérèse Raquin.

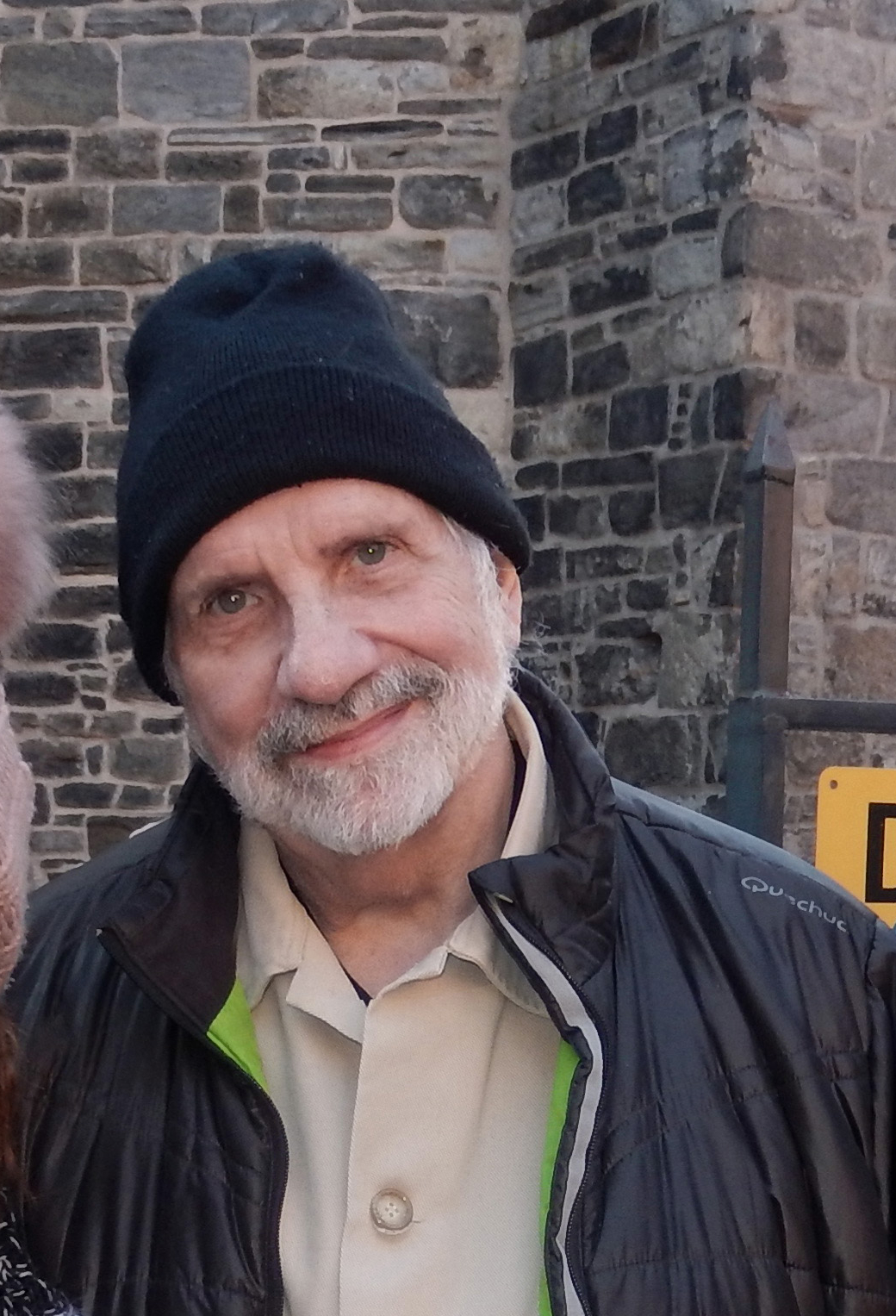
De Palma in 2019

It was announced in 2018 that De Palma would write and direct a horror film titled Predator, inspired by the Harvey Weinstein sexual abuse cases, and would direct Wagner Moura in a film titled Sweet Vengeance, based on two real-life murder cases. Filming on the latter was to have begun in early 2019 in Montevideo. In a 2020 interview with the Associated Press, De Palma confirmed that Predator was retitled Catch and Kill and added that he was to have started filming in August that same year.

In 2024, De Palma revealed to Vulture that he had "one other" undisclosed film he was planning to make, and that he was in the process of trying to cast it. This was later confirmed to be Sweet Vengeance, which he was said to begin work on in 2026.

== Filmmaking style, techniques and trademarks ==
De Palma's films can fall into two categories: his thriller films (Sisters, Body Double, Obsession, Dressed to Kill, Blow Out, Raising Cain) and his mainly commercial films (The Untouchables, Carlito's Way, and Mission: Impossible). He has often produced "De Palma" films one after the other before going on to direct a different genre, but would always return to his familiar territory. Because of the subject matter and graphic violence of some of De Palma's films, such as Dressed to Kill, Scarface, and Body Double, they are often at the center of controversy with the Motion Picture Association of America, film critics and the viewing public.

=== Inspirations ===
De Palma frequently quotes and refers to other directors' work. His early work was inspired by the films of Jean-Luc Godard. Michelangelo Antonioni's Blowup and Francis Ford Coppola's The Conversation plots were used for the basis of Blow Out. The Untouchables' finale shoot out in the train station is a clear borrowing from the Odessa Steps sequence in Sergei Eisenstein's The Battleship Potemkin. The main plot from Rear Window was used for Body Double, while it also used elements of Vertigo. Vertigo was also the basis for Obsession. Dressed to Kill was a note-for-note homage to Hitchcock's Psycho, including such moments as the surprise death of the lead actress and the exposition scene by the psychiatrist at the end.

=== Camera shots ===
Film critics have often noted De Palma's penchant for unusual camera angles and compositions. He often frames characters against the background using a canted angle shot. Split-screen techniques have been used to show two separate events happening simultaneously. To emphasize the dramatic effect of a certain scene De Palma has employed a 360-degree camera pan. Slow sweeping, panning, and tracking shots are often used throughout his films, often through precisely-choreographed long takes lasting for minutes without cutting. Split focus shots, often referred to as "di-opt", are used by De Palma to emphasize the foreground person/object while simultaneously keeping a background person/object in focus. Slow-motion is frequently used in his films to increase suspense.

== Personal life ==
De Palma has been married and divorced three times. His first marriage to actress Nancy Allen, one of his early close collaborators, lasted from 1979 to 1983. He married his second wife, producer Gale Anne Hurd, in 1991 and they divorced in 1993; they had one daughter, Lolita. De Palma was next married to Darnell Gregorio from 1995 to 1997, and with her he had another daughter, actress Piper De Palma. De Palma resides in Manhattan, New York City.

== Reception and legacy ==
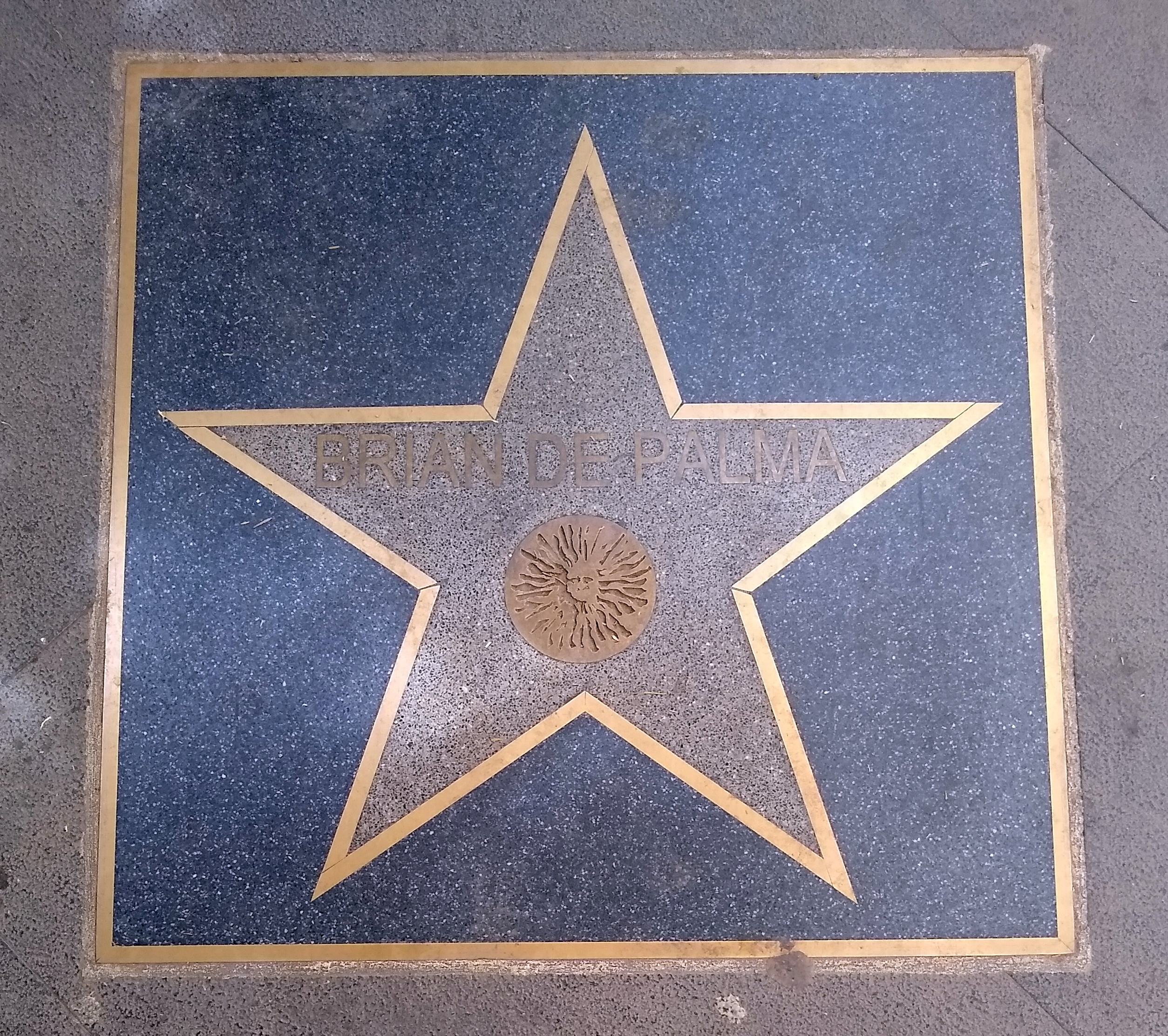
De Palma's star on the Almeria Walk of Fame in Almería, Spain

De Palma is often cited as a major figure of the New Hollywood generation of film directors, a distinct pedigree who either emerged from film schools or are overtly cine-literate. His contemporaries include Martin Scorsese, Paul Schrader, John Milius, George Lucas, Francis Ford Coppola, Steven Spielberg, John Carpenter, and Ridley Scott. His artistry in directing and use of cinematography and suspense in several of his films has often been compared to the work of Alfred Hitchcock. Psychologists have been intrigued by De Palma's fascination with pathology, by the aberrant behavior aroused in characters who find themselves manipulated by others.

De Palma has encouraged and fostered the filmmaking careers of directors such as Mark Romanek and Keith Gordon, the latter of whom collaborated with him twice as an actor, both in 1979's Home Movies and 1980's Dressed to Kill. Filmmakers influenced by De Palma include Terrence Malick, Quentin Tarantino, Ronny Yu, Don Mancini, Nacho Vigalondo, and Jack Thomas Smith. During an interview with De Palma, Tarantino said that Blow Out is one of his all-time favorite films, and that after watching Scarface he knew how to make his own film. John Travolta's performance as Jack Terry in Blow Out even resulted in Tarantino casting him as Vincent Vega in his 1994 film Pulp Fiction, which would go on to reinvigorate Travolta's then-declining career. Tarantino also placed Carrie at number eight in a list of his favorite films.

Critics who frequently admire De Palma's work include Pauline Kael and Roger Ebert. Kael wrote in her review of Blow Out, "At forty, Brian De Palma has more than twenty years of moviemaking behind him, and he has been growing better and better. Each time a new film of his opens, everything he has done before seems to have been preparation for it." In his review of Femme Fatale, Roger Ebert wrote about the director: "De Palma deserves more honor as a director. Consider also these titles: Sisters, Blow Out, The Fury, Dressed to Kill, Carrie, Scarface, Wise Guys, Casualties of War, Carlito's Way, Mission: Impossible. Yes, there are a few failures along the way (Snake Eyes, Mission to Mars, The Bonfire of the Vanities), but look at the range here, and reflect that these movies contain treasure for those who admire the craft as well as the story, who sense the glee with which De Palma manipulates images and characters for the simple joy of being good at it. It's not just that he sometimes works in the style of Hitchcock, but that he has the nerve to."

The influential French film magazine Cahiers du Cinéma has placed five of De Palma's films (Carlito's Way, Mission: Impossible, Snake Eyes, Mission to Mars, and Redacted) on their annual top ten list, with Redacted placing first on the 2008 list. The magazine also listed Carlito's Way as the greatest film of the 1990s.

Julie Salamon has written that critics have accused De Palma of being "a perverse misogynist", to which De Palma has responded with, "I'm always attacked for having an erotic, sexist approach – chopping up women, putting women in peril. I'm making suspense movies! What else is going to happen to them?" His films have also been interpreted as feminist and examined for their perceived queer affinities. In Film Comment's "Queer and Now and Then" column on Femme Fatale, film critic Michael Koresky writes that "De Palma's films radiate an undeniable queer energy" and notes the "intense appeal" De Palma's films have for gay critics. In her book The Erotic Thriller in Contemporary Cinema, Linda Ruth Williams writes that "De Palma understood the cinematic potency of dangerous fucking, perhaps earlier than his feminist detractors". Film scholar James Kenney wrote that De Palma is "in truth, one of cinema’s most complicated feminists."

Robin Wood considered Sisters an overtly feminist film, writing that "one can define the monster of Sisters as women's liberation; adding only that the film follows the time-honored horror film tradition of making the monster emerge as the most sympathetic character and its emotional center." Pauline Kael's review of Casualties of War, "A Wounded Apparition", describes the film as "feminist" and notes that "De Palma was always involved in examining (and sometimes satirizing) victimization, but he was often accused of being a victimizer". Helen Grace, in a piece for Lola, writes that upon seeing Dressed to Kill amidst calls for a boycott from feminist groups Women Against Violence Against Women and Women Against Pornography, that the film "seemed to say more about masculine anxiety than about the fears that women were expressing in relation to the film". De Palma has also expressed contrition for the depiction of a transgender murderer in the film, saying in a 2016 interview "I don't know what the transgender community would think [of the film now]... Obviously I realize that it's not good for their image to be transgender and also be a psychopathic murderer. But I think that [perception] passes with time. We're in a different time." In the same interview, he said he was "glad" that the film had become a "a favorite of the gay community".

David Thomson wrote of De Palma, "There is a self-conscious cunning in De Palma's work, ready to control everything except his own cruelty and indifference." Matt Zoller Seitz objected to this characterisation, writing that there are films from the director which can be seen as "straightforwardly empathetic and/or moralistic".

His life and career in his own words was the subject of the 2015 documentary De Palma, directed by Noah Baumbach and Jake Paltrow.

== Filmography ==
Directed features
Year	Title	Distributor
1968	Murder a la Mod	Aries Documentaries
1968	Greetings	Sigma III
1969	The Wedding Party	Ajay Film Company
1970	Hi, Mom!	Sigma III
1970	Dionysus in '69	Sigma III
1972	Get to Know Your Rabbit	Warner Bros.
1972	Sisters	American International Pictures
1974	Phantom of the Paradise	20th Century Fox
1976	Obsession	Columbia Pictures
1976	Carrie	United Artists
1978	The Fury	20th Century Fox
1979	Home Movies	United Artists
1980	Dressed to Kill	Filmways Pictures
1981	Blow Out	Filmways Pictures
1983	Scarface	Universal Pictures
1984	Body Double	Columbia Pictures
1986	Wise Guys	Metro-Goldwyn-Mayer
1987	The Untouchables	Paramount Pictures
1989	Casualties of War	Columbia Pictures
1990	The Bonfire of the Vanities	Warner Bros.
1992	Raising Cain	Universal Pictures
1993	Carlito's Way	Universal Pictures
1996	Mission: Impossible	Paramount Pictures
1998	Snake Eyes	Paramount Pictures / Buena Vista International
2000	Mission to Mars	Buena Vista Pictures Distribution
2002	Femme Fatale	Warner Bros.
2006	The Black Dahlia	Universal Pictures
2007	Redacted	Magnolia Pictures
2012	Passion	Entertainment One
2019	Domino	Signature Entertainment
TBA	Sweet Vengeance	

== Accolades ==
Year	Title	Academy Awards		BAFTA Awards		Golden Globe Awards	
Year	Title	Nominations	Wins	Nominations	Wins	Nominations	Wins
1974	Phantom of the Paradise	1				1	
1976	Obsession	1					
1976	Carrie	2				1	
1980	Dressed to Kill					1	
1983	Scarface					3	
1984	Body Double					1	
1987	The Untouchables	4	1	4	1	2	1
1989	Casualties of War					1	
1993	Carlito's Way					2	
2006	The Black Dahlia	1					
Total		9	1	4	1	12	1

Directed Academy Award performances
Under De Palma's direction, these actors have received Academy Award nominations (and one win) for their performances in their respective roles.

Year	Performer	Film	Result
Academy Award for Best Actress
1976	Sissy Spacek	Carrie	Nominated
Academy Award for Best Supporting Actor
1987	Sean Connery	The Untouchables	Won
Academy Award for Best Supporting Actress
1976	Piper Laurie	Carrie	Nominated

== Bibliography ==
- Are Snakes Necessary? (2020), co-authored with Susan Lehman
- Ambrose Chapel: A Screenplay (2025)
- Terry (TBA), co-authored with Susan Lehman

== Bibliography ==
- De Palma, Brian; Lehman, Susan (May 16, 2018). Les serpents sont-ils nécessaires? (in French). Translated by Esch, Jean. Paris: Payot & Rivages. ISBN 978-2-7436-4445-1. OCLC 1037152284.
- Thomson, David (October 26, 2010). The New Biographical Dictionary of Film: Fifth Edition, Completely Updated and Expanded (hardcover ed.). Knopf. ISBN 978-0-307-27174-7.
- Salamon, Julie (1991). Devil's Candy: The Bonfire of the Vanities Goes to Hollywood (hardcover ed.). Houghton. ISBN 0-395-56996-6.
- Bliss, Michael (1986). Brian De Palma. Scarecrow.
- Blumenfeld, Samuel, Vachaud, Laurent (2001). Brian De Palma. Calmann-Levy.
- Dworkin, Susan (1984). Double De Palma: A Film Study with Brian De Palma. Newmarket.
