= List of Nancy Allen performances =

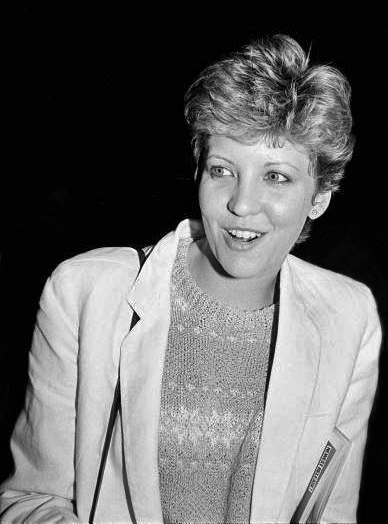
Allen in 1983

Nancy Allen is an American actress who began her career in the early 1970s. She made her feature film debut in a minor role opposite Jack Nicholson in The Last Detail (1973), before being cast as Chris Hargensen in Brian De Palma's film adaptation of Carrie (1976). She subsequently had a starring role in Robert Zemeckis's comedy I Wanna Hold Your Hand (1978), followed by a supporting part in Steven Spielberg's 1941 (1979).

Allen went on to collaborate with De Palma on several other films in the 1980s, including Home Movies (1980), the erotic thriller Dressed to Kill (also 1980; for which she was nominated for a Golden Globe Award), and the neo-noir Blow Out (1981). In 1984, Allen appeared in the science fiction film The Philadelphia Experiment, and later had a starring role in Abel Ferrara's The Gladiator (1986). Allen was subsequently cast by director Paul Verhoeven in the science fiction thriller RoboCop (1987) as Officer Anne Lewis, a role she reprised in the first and second sequels.

Through the 1990s, Allen appeared in several independent films and television productions, including a lead role in the French drama The Patriots (1994), directed by Éric Rochant, and a supporting role in Steven Soderbergh's crime comedy Out of Sight (1998). As a result of this performance, the following year, she appeared in the crime film Kiss Toledo Goodbye, as well as the direct-to-video horror sequel Children of the Corn 666: Isaac's Return. She subsequently had guest-starring roles on the television series The Division and Law & Order: Special Victims Unit in 2002 and 2003, respectively.

== Film ==
Year	Title	Role	Director(s)	Notes	Ref.
1973	The Last Detail	Nancy	Hal Ashby		
1975	Forced Entry	Hitchhiker	Jim Sotos		
1976	Carrie	Christine "Chris" Hargensen	Brian De Palma		
1978	I Wanna Hold Your Hand	Pam Mitchell	Robert Zemeckis		
1979	1941	Donna Stratton	Steven Spielberg		
1980	Home Movies	Kristina	Brian De Palma		
1980	Dressed to Kill	Liz Blake	Brian De Palma		
1981	Blow Out	Sally Bedina	Brian De Palma		
1983	Strange Invaders	Betty Walker	Michael Laughlin		
1984	The Buddy System	Carrie	Glenn Jordan		
1984	Terror in the Aisles	Herself	Andrew J. Kuehn		
1984	The Philadelphia Experiment	Allison Hayes	Stewart Raffill		
1984	Not for Publication	Lois Thorndyke	Paul Bartel		
1986	The Gladiator	Susan Neville	Abel Ferrara	Television film	
1987	Sweet Revenge	Jillian Grey	Mark Sobel		
1987	RoboCop	Officer Anne Lewis	Paul Verhoeven		
1988	Poltergeist III	Patricia "Pat" Wilson-Gardner / Trish Wilson	Gary Sherman		
1989	Limit Up	Casey Falls	Richard Martini		
1990	RoboCop 2	Anne Lewis	Irvin Kershner		
1990	Memories of Murder	Jennifer Gordon/Corey	Robert Lewis	Television film	
1993	RoboCop 3	Anne Lewis	Fred Dekker		
1993	Acting on Impulse	Cathy Thomas	Sam Irvin	Television film	
1994	The Man Who Wouldn't Die	Jessie Gallardo	Bill Condon	Television film	
1994	Les patriotes	Catherine Pelman	Éric Rochant	English: The Patriots	
1997	Against the Law	Maggie Hewitt	Jim Wynorski		
1997	Dusting Cliff 7	Anna Bishop	William H. Molina	Also known as: Last Assassins	
1998	The Pass	Shirley Duprey	Kurt Voss		
1998	Out of Sight	Midge	Steven Soderbergh		
1999	Secret of the Andes	Brenda Willings	Alejandro Azzano		
1999	Kiss Toledo Goodbye	Madge	Lyndon Chubbuck		
1999	Children of the Corn 666: Isaac's Return	Rachel Colby	Kari Skogland	Direct to video	
2001	Circuit	Louise	Dirk Shafer		
2008	My Apocalypse	Linda Savage	Chris LaMont	Filmed in 1997; also known as: Quality Time	
2012	Bound by Flesh	Narrator	Leslie Zemeckis	Documentary	
2020	In Search of Darkness: Part II	Herself	David A. Weiner	Documentary	
2022	In Search of Tomorrow	Herself	David A. Weiner	Documentary	

== Television ==
Year	Title	Role	Notes	Ref.
1983–1984	Another World	Paula James	Unknown episodes	
1984	Faerie Tale Theatre	Princess Elizabeth	Episode: "The Princess and the Pea"	
1994	Touched by an Angel	Megan	Episode: "An Unexpected Snow"	
1995	The Outer Limits	Rachel Rose	Episode: "Valerie 23"	
1995	The Commish	Gina Raposo	Episode: "Brooklyn"	
2002	The Division	Christine Ogden	Episode: "Brave New World"	
2003	Law & Order: Special Victims Unit	Carin Healy	Episode: "Escape"	

== Stage ==
Year	Title	Role	Notes	Ref.
1995–1996	Dial M For Murder	Margot Wendice	Broadway	

== Sources ==
- Bleiler, David (2004). TLA Video & DVD Guide 2005: The Discerning Film Lover's Guide. New York: Macmillan. ISBN 978-0-312-31690-7.
- Bouzereau, Laurent (1988). The DePalma Cut: The Films of America's Most Controversial Director. New York: Dembner Books. ISBN 978-0-942-63704-5.
- Jackson, Kathi (2007). Steven Spielberg: A Biography. Westport, Connecticut: Greenwood Publishing. ISBN 978-0-313-33796-3.
- Kirshner, Jonathan (2012). Hollywood's Last Golden Age: Politics, Society, and the Seventies Film in America. Ithaca, New York: Cornell University Press. ISBN 978-0-801-46584-0.
- Martin, Mick; Porter, Marsha (2003). DVD and Video Guide 2004. New York: Ballantine Books. ISBN 978-0-345-44994-8.
- Quigley, Eileen S. (2007). International Television & Video Almanac. Groton, Massachusetts: Quigley Publishing Company. ISBN 978-0-900-61081-3.
- Quinlan, David (1997). The Film Lover's Companion: An A to Z Guide to 2,000 Stars and the Movies They Made. Seacaucus, New Jersey: Carol Publishing. ISBN 978-0-806-51892-3.
- Rogall, Stefan (2003). Steven Soderbergh und seine Filme (in German). Marburg, Germany: Schüren. ISBN 978-3-894-72340-8.
- Sykes, Brad (2018). Terror in the Desert: Dark Cinema of the American Southwest. Jefferson, North Carolina: McFarland. ISBN 978-1-476-63132-5.
- Weldon, Michael (1996). The Psychotronic Video Guide To Film. New York: Macmillan. ISBN 978-0-312-13149-4.
- Young, R. G., ed. (2000). The Encyclopedia of Fantastic Film: Ali Baba to Zombies. New York: Applause Books. ISBN 978-1-55783-269-6.
