= Blow Out =

1981 film by Brian De Palma

- Theatrical release poster
- Directed by: Brian De Palma
- Written by: Brian De Palma
- Produced by: George Litto
- Starring: John Travolta; Nancy Allen; John Lithgow; Dennis Franz
- Cinematography: Vilmos Zsigmond
- Edited by: Paul Hirsch
- Music by: Pino Donaggio
- Production company: Viscount Associates
- Distributed by: Filmways Pictures
- Release date: July 24, 1981
- Running time: 108 minutes
- Country: United States
- Language: English
- Budget: $18 million
- Box office: $13.8 million

Blow Out is a 1981 American neo-noir mystery thriller film written and directed by Brian De Palma. It stars John Travolta as a sound technician from Philadelphia who, while recording sounds for a low-budget slasher film, unintentionally captures audio evidence of an assassination. Nancy Allen stars as Sally Bedina, a young woman involved in the crime. The supporting cast includes John Lithgow and Dennis Franz.

Inspired by Michelangelo Antonioni's 1966 film Blowup, Blow Out replaces the medium of photography with audio recording. The concept of Blow Out came to De Palma while he was working on the thriller Dressed to Kill (1980). Independently produced and distributed by Filmways Pictures, the film was shot in late 1980 in various Philadelphia locations on a budget of $18 million.

Blow Out opened to little audience interest but mostly positive reviews. The performances of Travolta and Allen, the direction and the visual style were cited as the strongest points. Critics also recognized the stylistic and narrative connection to the work of Alfred Hitchcock, whom De Palma admires, and giallo films. It has developed status as a cult film.

== Plot ==
While in post-production on the low-budget slasher film Co-ed Frenzy, Philadelphia sound technician Jack Terry is instructed by his producer Sam to obtain a more realistic-sounding scream and better wind effects. As he records potential sound effects at a local park, Jack sees a car careen off the road and plunge into a creek. The male driver is killed, but Jack manages to rescue a young woman named Sally Bedina and accompanies her to a hospital. There, a detective interviews Jack about the accident, and Jack asks Sally out for a drink. He learns that Governor George McRyan, a presidential hopeful, was driving the car and that Sally was his escort. An associate of McRyan, Lawrence Henry, persuades Jack to conceal her involvement by smuggling her out of the hospital.

Listening to his recorded audio of the accident, Jack hears a gunshot just before the tire blow-out, suspecting that it was actually an assassination. He learns from a news report that, seemingly coincidentally, a man named Manny Karp filmed the accident with a motion picture camera. When Karp sells stills from his film to a local tabloid, News Today Magazine, Jack splices them together into a crude movie, syncs them with his recorded audio and finds a visible flash and smoke from the fired gun. Though initially reluctant, Sally eventually agrees to help Jack privately investigate the incident. Over a drink, Jack reveals how he left his prior career as part of a government commission to root out police corruption after a wiretap operation he was involved in led to the death of an undercover cop named Freddie Corso.

Unbeknownst to Jack, Sally and Karp are both frequent blackmail co-conspirators, and were hired as part of a larger plot against McRyan. A rival candidate had hired an operative named Burke to hook McRyan with Sally posing as a prostitute, take unflattering pictures of the pair, and publish them to expedite McRyan's withdrawal. However, Burke decided to blow out the tire of McRyan's car with a gunshot, thereby causing the accident. After botching the cover-up of Sally by murdering a look-alike, Burke murders two more look-alike women with piano wire and attributes the deaths to a fictional serial killer, "the Liberty Bell Strangler," so that he can cover up the cover-up when she is successfully murdered.

To help Jack investigate McRyan's murder, Sally steals Karp's film, which, when synced to Jack's audio, clearly reveals the gunshot that precipitated the blow-out. Nevertheless, nobody believes Jack's story and a seemingly widespread conspiracy immediately silences his every move. Local talk-show host Frank Donahue asks to interview Jack on air and release his tapes, to which Jack eventually agrees. Burke follows the development by tapping Jack's phone, calls Sally as Donahue, and asks her to meet him at a train station with the tapes. When Sally tells Jack about Donahue's call, he becomes suspicious. He copies the audio tapes, but is unable to copy the film before Sally's meeting.

Shadowing a wired Sally from a distance, Jack is alarmed to see that his supposed contact is taking her away. Realizing that she is in danger, Jack attempts to warn her, but she and Burke slip out of range and onto a train. Jack manically dashes across the city, attempting to head them off and rescue her, but crashes his Jeep and is incapacitated. By the time he awakens in a parked ambulance, Burke has stolen the film from Sally and thrown it into a river. Still listening in on his earpiece as he races to find them, Jack spots Burke attacking her on a rooftop, startles him and stabs him to death with his own weapon, but Sally is already dead and he cradles her lifeless body in his arms.

Burke's death, combined with the loss of the film, ties up the last loose end. Jack's audio tapes alone are deemed insufficient to prove that a gunshot occurred. Jack obsessively replays the recording of Sally's voice and incorporates her dying scream in Co-ed Frenzy. Ecstatic at having found the perfect scream, Sam replays the audio, forcing Jack to cover his ears.

== Cast ==
- John Travolta as Jack Terry
- Nancy Allen as Sally Bedina
- John Lithgow as Burke
- Dennis Franz as Manny Karp
- Peter Boyden as Sam
- Lori-Nan Engler as Sue
- Curt May as Frank Donahue
- John Aquino as Detective Mackey
- John McMartin as Lawrence Henry
- Robin Sherwood as Betty
- Michael Tearson as Hawker

== Production ==
After completing Dressed to Kill, De Palma was considering several projects, including Act of Vengeance (later produced for HBO starring Charles Bronson and Ellen Burstyn), Flashdance, and a script of his own titled Personal Effects. The story outline for Personal Effects was similar to what would become Blow Out, but set in Canada.

According to screenwriter Bill Mesce Jr., he wrote the first draft of the script after winning a competition in Take One magazine hosted by Brian De Palma, but his version ended up being almost completely changed.

De Palma scripted and filmed Blow Out in his home town of Philadelphia. The film's $18 million budget was high for De Palma, and Filmways spent an additional $9 million to market the film. De Palma considered Al Pacino for the role of Jack Terry, but ultimately chose John Travolta. The actor lobbied De Palma to cast Nancy Allen for the role of Sally Bedina (the three had previously worked together on Carrie). De Palma initially hesitated—he was married to Allen at the time, and did not want her to be known for working only in his pictures—but ultimately agreed. In addition to Travolta and Allen, De Palma filled the film's cast and crew with a number of previous collaborators: Dennis Franz (Dressed to Kill, The Fury); John Lithgow (Obsession); cinematographer Vilmos Zsigmond (Obsession); editor Paul Hirsch (Hi, Mom!, Sisters, Phantom of the Paradise, Obsession, Carrie, The Fury); and composer Pino Donaggio (Carrie, Home Movies, Dressed to Kill).

Seventy percent of the film was shot at night. "Basically I just shot Blow Out straight", replied cinematographer Vilmos Zsigmond, "... By not diffusing and not flashing as much ... That doesn't mean I necessarily like that look but I think it was good for the picture. You see, I like a softer look, a more diffused look." During the editing process, two reels of footage from the Liberty Parade sequence were stolen and never recovered. The scenes were reshot with insurance money at a cost of $750,000. Because Zsigmond was no longer available, László Kovács filmed these reshot sequences.

== Themes and allusions ==
Thematically, Blow Out almost "exclusively concern[s] the mechanics of movie making" with a "total, complete and utter preoccupation with film itself as a medium in which ... style really is content." In numerous scenes, the film depicts the interaction of sound and images, the manner in which the two are joined together, and methods by which they are re-edited, remixed, and rearranged to reveal new truths or the lack of any objective truth. The film uses several of De Palma's trademark techniques: split screen, the split diopter lens, and the elaborate tracking shot.

As with several other De Palma films, Blow Out explores the power of guilt; both Jack and Sally are motivated to help right their past wrongs, both with tragic consequences. De Palma also revisits the theme of voyeurism, a recurring theme in much of his previous work (ex:, Hi, Mom!, Sisters, and Dressed to Kill). Jack exhibits elements of a peeping tom, but one who works with sound instead of image.

Blow Out incorporates allusions to other films and to historical events. Its protagonist's obsessive reconstruction of a sound recording to uncover a possible murder recalls both Michelangelo Antonioni's film Blowup and Francis Ford Coppola's The Conversation. The film alludes to elements of the JFK assassination. It refers to the Zapruder film in showing footage of the car "accident". The film also recalls elements of the Chappaquiddick incident, although De Palma intentionally tried to downplay the similarities.

De Palma quotes two of his projects. At one point in the film, Dennis Franz watches De Palma's film Murder a la Mod on television. Originally, the character was to watch Coppola's Dementia 13, but director Roger Corman demanded too much money for the rights. The premise of the flashback - when Travolta recalls an incident where his work got a police informant killed - was taken from an abandoned project, Prince of the City. This was a passion project by De Palma that he felt had been "stolen" from him. The film was ultimately directed by Sidney Lumet.

== Reception ==
=== Critical response ===
Blow Out opened on July 24, 1981, to positive reviews from critics, including several that were ecstatic. In The New Yorker, Pauline Kael gave the film one of her few unconditional raves:

De Palma has sprung to the place that Robert Altman achieved with films such as McCabe & Mrs. Miller and Nashville and that Francis Ford Coppola reached with The Godfather films—that is, to the place where genre is transcended and what we're moved by is an artist's vision ... it's a great movie. Travolta and Allen are radiant performers.

Roger Ebert's four-star review in the Chicago Sun-Times noted that Blow Out "is inhabited by a real cinematic intelligence. The audience isn't condescended to ... we share the excitement of figuring out how things develop and unfold, when so often the movies only need us as passive witnesses." Both Ebert and fellow critic Gene Siskel recommended it on its original run (and with the former putting it as part of his list of their "Buried Treasures" in a 1986 episode of At the Movies). Review aggregator website Rotten Tomatoes gives the film a rating of 89% based on 61 reviews, with an average grade of 7.90/10. The critical consensus reads, "With a story inspired by Antonioni's Blowup and a style informed by the high-gloss suspense of Hitchcock, De Palma's Blow Out is raw, politically informed, and littered with film references". Metacritic, which uses a weighted average, assigned the film a score of 86 out of 100, based on 15 critics, indicating "universal acclaim". Audiences polled by CinemaScore gave the film an average grade of "B" on an A+ to F scale.

=== Box office ===
The film floundered at the box office, due to negative word of mouth about its bleak ending. Blow Out made $13,747,234 (or $41.1 million in 2025) at the box office. (Note: According to Bouzerau's book, Blow Out returned approximately $8 million at the box office.) It was considered a disappointment, as Filmways had publicly claimed the film would make $60–80 million. Rentals generated $8 million.

=== Legacy ===
The public reputation of Blow Out has grown considerably in the years following its release. As a "movie about making movies", it has earned a natural audience with subsequent generations of cineastes. The filmmaker Quentin Tarantino has consistently praised it, listing it alongside Rio Bravo and Taxi Driver as one of his favorite films. In homage, Tarantino used the music cue "Sally and Jack" from the score by Pino Donaggio within his 2007 film Death Proof.

Noel Murray and Scott Tobias of The A.V. Club put Blow Out at #1 of their list of De Palma's best films, describing it as: "The quintessential De Palma film, this study of a movie craftsman investigating a political cover-up marries suspense, sick humor, sexuality, and leftist cynicism into an endlessly reflective study of art imitating life imitating art."

In April 2011, the film became a part of the Criterion Collection with a DVD and Blu-ray release. Special features include new interviews with Brian De Palma and Nancy Allen. The Criterion release also includes De Palma's first feature-length film Murder a la Mod.

In 2023, Time selected Blow Out as part of their list 100 Best Movies of the Past 10 Decades, praising it as "a film filled with mistrust, one where the ghosts of Chappaquiddick and the Zapruder film lurk in the corners."

=== Accolades ===
Award	Category	Subject	Result	Ref.
National Society of Film Critics Awards	Best Cinematography	Vilmos Zsigmond	Nominated	
Satellite Awards	Best Classic DVD		Nominated	

== See also ==
- 1981 in film
- Audio surveillance
- The Conversation, 1974 film similar in content
- List of American films of 1981
- List of films featuring fictional films
- List of films featuring surveillance
