= Robin Wilson (singer) =

American singer and actress

- Born: United States
- Genres: Pop
- Occupations: Singer, actress
- Instrument: Voice
- Years active: 1966 – 1970s
- Label: A&M

Robin Wilson is a singer and actress active in the late 1960s and mid 1970s. She had a hit in 1968 with "Where Are They Now". In the 1970s she had a recurring role in the television series Hot l Baltimore.

== Background ==
Robin Wilson grew up in Southern California. She also spent time in Columbia, Missouri, where she attended Stephens College for a year.

She would end up having a 1968 hit on the Billboard Easy Listening Top 40 chart with "Where Are They Now".

== Career ==
=== 1960s ===
After her college she returned to California, she came into contact with actress Rhonda Fleming who pointed her in the direction of a leading talent agency. She eventually landed a role in the musical Bye, Bye Birdie which starred George Gobel. The musical played at the Circle Star Theater. Unfortunately for her she was summoned by the theater manager who told her that she had no talent and to get out of the business. This in turn made her decide to go to Hawaii. While there she worked in a number of jobs. One night she walked into a club that was owned by Don Ho, the well-known Hawaiian entertainer. He called her up to sing a song and liked what he heard. As a result of this she was added to his entourage and in 1966, she went with him on his second tour to the United States. With the entourage, touring different cities she garnered attention and impressed both the audiences and critics. While she was in San Francisco, she received a standing ovation and the very manager who told her to leave the business was there. She was to later star in the Broadway comedy Henry Sweet Henry.

It was reported in the February 25, 1967 issue of Cash Box that Robin Wilson was signed to Don Ho's Ho-Brown Productions company. She was also the Los Angeles company's first contracted artist to release an album.

"Where Are They Now"

It was reported by Record World in the magazine's August 31 issue that "Where Are They Now" was selling in St. Louis, getting play on Seattle stations, KJR and KOL and doing well on KISN in Portland. The following week, it was doing well in Seattle. It was reported in the September 7 issue of Record World that it had broken out on radio stations KOL and KJR in Seattle.

It made its debut at no. 36 in the Billboard Easy Listening Top 40 on the week ending September 28, 1968. Spending a total of three weeks on the chart, it reached its peak position of 35 the following week and held that spot for one more week.

The song made its debut at 39 in the Record World Top Non-Rock chart on the week of October 5. It peaked at no. 37 the following week.

Further activities

Her self titled album released on A&M SP 4153 was reviewed in the March 1, 1969 issue of Record World with the reviewer writing, "Gal has a strong voice, a feel for a lyric and loads of persona". The picks were "For Once in My Life," "Soon It's Gonna Rain" and "A House is Not a Home".

Don Ho's performance at New York's Engine Room was reviewed in the May 3, 1969 issue of Cash Box. She sang in duet with Ho on the song "What Now My Love". Her projecting urgency, power and the gentleness of her delivery was noted. The strength and vitality in her solo take of "For Once in My Life" was also noted. She also dueted with Ho on "Born Free" which the reviewer called "soaring".

Wilson came no. 10 in a list of the Top 12 "Most Promising Up and Coming Female Vocalists" in the Cash Box 1969 Dee Jay Poll Winners.

It was reported in the 15 August 1969 issue of the Oakland Tribune that Don Ho and singers would appear at the Circle Star in San Carlos September 6 and 7. The singers were called The Now Generation and consisted of her, Tobi Allen, Vicki Burton, Angel Pablo and the Elsner sisters. Other singers were Brigette, Pam and Paula.

=== 1970s ===
Her single "Better Use Your Head" was reviewed in the January 1 issue of Billboard. A Top 60 Spotlight single, it was given very good chart potential. It was also reviewed in the January 8, 1972 issue of Cash Box. The reviewer said she made it her own and put her all into every note. The MOR and pop potential was noted as well.

There was news of a forthcoming album for Wilson. It was reported by Cash Box in the June 13, 1970 issue that Bones Howe's company Mister Bones Productions had entered into a production deal involving Bob Alcivar. A&M artists Wilson and The Sandpipers were to have albums produced by him. The resulting album was Ain't That Something which included the tracks, "Hands Off the Man", "I Don’t Know How to Love Him", "Love, Don’t Let Me Down", " Sooner Or Later" and "I Can’t Make It Anymore".

She was one of the artists picked to appear at the KMPC Charity Night at the Forum in Los Angeles on October 2, 1971. The event which was headlined by Glen Campbell also included other artists such as Freda Payne, Della Reese, Helen Reddy and Bob Newhart etc.

== Acting ==
Wilson had a role where she played the part of Jackie in the television series Hot l Baltimore. She also had a role as Sylvia in the "Gloria Is Nervous" episode of All in the Family.

== Discography ==
Albums
| Act | Release | Catalogue | Year | Notes |
|---|---|---|---|---|
| Don Ameche Co-Starring Carol Bruce with Neva Small, Louise Lasser, Alice Playten, Milo Boulton and Introducing Robin Wilson | Henry, Sweet Henry (Original Broadway Cast) | ABC Records ABCS-OC-4 | 1967 | |
| Robin Wilson | Robin Wilson | A&M Records SP 4153 | 1968 | |
| Robin Wilson | Ain't That Something | A&M Records SP-4299 | 1970 | |
