= Andrew J. Kuehn =

American film director (1937–2004)

- Born: September 24, 1937; Chicago, Illinois, United States
- Died: January 29, 2004 (aged 66); Laguna Beach, California, United States
- Occupations: Film producer, film director

Andrew J. Kuehn (September 24, 1937 – January 29, 2004) was an American film producer notable for revolutionizing the American film trailer in the early 1960s and for producing and directing featurette films for television such as, Lights, Camera, Annie! Getting in Shape for the "Main Event", and Behind the Scenes: Beyond the Poseidon Adventure as well as documentaries and feature-length motion pictures including D.O.A., Get Bruce, and Terror in the Aisles.

== Early life ==
Andrew J. Kuehn was raised on the South side of Chicago, Illinois. He attended the University of Miami, produced a local radio show and worked as a floor manager for a local sports television show. In 1961, Kuehn started working with National Screen Service, which was the predominant, if not singular, provider of motion picture trailers to Hollywood. At the time, their trailers typically featured a great deal of copy, slowly paced editing, bold graphic treatment of titles and cast information, and a presentational style borrowed from circus pitchmen and carnival barkers.

== Move to Hollywood ==
Tapped by MGM to come to Hollywood, he contributed to the success of such important films such as Doctor Zhivago, and Blowup, and in 1964, Kuehn distributed his independently produced trailer for Night of the Iguana, using stark, high-contrast photography, fast-paced editing and a provocative narration by a young James Earl Jones. His format was so successful, he began producing this new form of trailer with partner Dan Davis.

Kuehn opened the West Coast office of Kaleidoscope Films in 1968 and Kuehn and his company became a major player in the trailer industry for the next three decades. As Hollywood began to produce bigger blockbuster films and invest more money in marketing them, directors like Steven Spielberg, Oliver Stone and Barbra Streisand began to depend on Kuehn and Kaleidoscope for their ability to create the best trailers theater-goers could see. Kuehn alumni include leading trailer makers and marketing creatives.

Kuehn developed trailers for films including the original Jaws, the Indiana Jones trilogy, E.T. the Extra-Terrestrial, Schindler's List, The Lost World: Jurassic Park, The French Connection, The Sting, Funny Girl, Aliens, Top Gun, Back to the Future, JFK, and Witness.

"A trailer is two or three minutes long - about the length of a song - and I think of trailers as songs," said Kuehn, who was noted for his clever writing, use of music and sharp editing. "One of the hardest things to do when looking at a movie is to determine the overall tone, tempo, mood, pacing and rhythm of the trailer. They may not be the same as the tone and rhythms of the picture itself."

In a trade interview, Kuehn said, "A trailer has but one goal: to draw audiences out of their houses and into a theater. To do that you have to set up a sense of urgency. In the process of arriving at that forced pace, we advanced the style of editing. We really pushed the envelope in terms of what audiences would accept."

"Andy was a kaleidoscope, never repetitious, always visually original, and above all, he was a lovely man: fun to be with, fun to work with. Andy understood the rhythms of editing and the important role music plays in telling a story. He never relied on the same creative idea twice. I also treasured that there were so many other dimensions to him as a person that enriched our time together. His passion for his art, his passion for his country, and for life in general, will be very sorely missed." - Barbra Streisand

"...Over the years, they worked on so many of the films that I directed or produced, and I remember not just with ET or Schindler´s list, but also the times when the campaigns may have even been better than some the films I produced, and that´s as much a salute to Andy´s talent as his long list of tremendously successful pictures. Andy did it by building relationship with filmmakers, he did it by setting high standards of creativity, and he did it because he had good taste. And although he´s now no longer in the cutting room, there are so many people who have learned from him and worked with him, that his legacy of coming attractions goes on and on and on." - Steven Spielberg

In 1994, Kuehn was honored by the Cannes Lions with a lifetime achievement award. On the tribute reel dedicated to his career, more than 1000 trailers were credited to Kuehn, including re-releases for Casablanca, his favorite film, and the 1927 silent epic Napoleon.

As well as making trailers, Kuehn co-produced the feature films Coming Apart and D.O.A., directed Flush and produced and directed the documentaries Terror in the Aisles (a thriller- horror anthology hosted by Donald Pleasence and Nancy Allen), Get Bruce and The Great American Songbook (a PBS television study of American popular music, in 2003.

== Legacy ==
Top trailer companies have all been run by former Kaleidoscope creatives, like The Cimarron Group (Chris Arnold), Ant Farm, Aspect Ratio (Mark Trugman), Trailer Park (Benedict Coulter) and Motor Entertainment, run by Greg McClatchy, who previously headed up the film marketing division at 20th Century Fox. Michael Camp headed the trailer department at Paramount Pictures, Tom Kennedy at MGM, Jeff Werner and Vince Arcaro all started their own successful trailer companies and Bob Harper began his career as a messenger at Kaleidoscope before becoming a producer and quickly Vice-Chairman of Fox Filmed Entertainment and, in 2007, Chairman of Regency Entertainment. Top industry film trailer music composer John Everett Beal credits his career success to the thirty-year collaboration with Kuehn and their revolutionary approach of creating original scores using a whole new musical template.

On March 15, 2006, the Andrew J. Kuehn Foundation released Coming Attractions: The History of Movie Trailers, which he inspired, financed and guided through development. As mandated by the Andrew J. Kuehn, Jr. Foundation, "Coming Attractions" is to be freely distributed to film schools, film archives and film-related institutions nationally and worldwide. Produced, written and shot by long-term collaborators of his, "Coming Attractions" features rare archival footage and interviews with the top creative and executive talent in the industry, as well as the insights and discoveries of leading academics, archivists and collectors. The Academy Film Archive houses the Andrew J. Kuehn, Jr. Foundation collection, which includes footage used to make Coming Attractions and the completed documentary.
