= Robert Prince (composer) =

American drummer

- Born: May 10, 1929; New York City, U.S.
- Died: May 4, 2007 (aged 77) Los Angeles, California, U.S.
- Genres: Dance Theatre; Television; Film; Records
- Occupations: Composer, arranger, producer
- Instruments: drums, percussion
- Labels: Columbia, Warner Bros., RCA Victor

Robert Prince (May 10, 1929 – March 4, 2007) was an American composer of music for dance, theater, television, film and records and a graduate of the Juilliard School. In addition to his work as composer and arranger he also performed on vibraphone and timpani.

== Dance and theater ==
Prince is noted for composing the jazz-influenced music for N.Y. Export: Op. Jazz (1958) and Events (1961). These were groundbreaking modern ballets choreographed by Jerome Robbins for his company Ballets USA.

Prince also composed incidental music for the play Oh Dad, Poor Dad, Mamma's Hung You in the Closet and I'm Feelin' So Sad which Robbins directed off-Broadway in 1962. He also composed and arranged music for the musicals Something More! (1964), Half a Sixpence (1965) and The Office (1966). Music for the 1979 theater production of Cause Celebre by Terence Rattigan at the Ahmanson Theater and original score for the Ahmanson’s production of Shakespeare’s Macbeth.

== Film and television ==
Prince composed the music for Francis Ford Coppola's 1966 film You're a Big Boy Now, the George Peppard film Newman's Law (1974), the cult horror film Squirm (1976) and the blaxploitation movie J. D.'s Revenge (1976), and wrote the music for TV movies such as Gargoyles (1972), The Return of Charlie Chan (1973), Scream, Pretty Peggy (1973), The Strange and Deadly Occurrence (1974), Where Have All the People Gone? (1974), The Dead Don't Die (1975) and Snowbeast (1977).

Throughout the 1960s and 1970s he composed music for a variety of dramatic television series including episodes of The Wild Wild West, Dynasty, Mission: Impossible, Banacek, Wonder Woman, The Streets of San Francisco, Kojack,Columbo, Murder, She Wrote, and Rod Serling's Night Gallery. He is also credited with the 1975 Universal Television jingle, which incorporated the first four notes of Esquivel and Wilson's Revue/Universal TV fanfare. Additional scores for TV series included Bionic Woman, Ripleys Believe It or Not, Matlock, Mission: Impossible, Banacek, The Blue Knight, Ironside, McCloud, The Wild Wild West, Mannix, The Gathering I and IIThe Virginian, The Young and the Restless, and Alias Smith and Jones.

== Jazz ==
Prince was also active as a composer, arranger and producer in the jazz and pop field where he went by the name Bob Prince and contributed to several projects for Columbia Records in the 1950s for Paul Desmond, Johnny Mathis, Johnny Hodges, and Wayne Shorter

Commissioned to write “Meet the Band” for Benny Goodman USSR Tour of The Soviet Union in 1962 for a piece “that would introduce each member of the band and then feature the horn sections as units. It was the second number after the theme every night of the tour and invariably got everyone into a good groove.” Liner notes to RCA Records Benny Goodman in Moscow </ref”>

Contracted to the Warner Bros. label in 1959 he released four albums under his own name. Notable among these albums is Saxes Inc. which is arranged for an ensemble of twelve saxophones and rhythm section and features some of the top New York jazz and studio players of the time including Phil Woods, Gene Quill, Al Cohn and Zoot Sims. There is also a guest appearance by Coleman Hawkins.

Prince's two compositions for Jerome Robbins are considered excellent examples of Third stream music, the blending of jazz and classical styles.

== Discography ==
=== As leader ===
- What's New? New Jazz from Teo Macero and Bob Prince – Columbia CL 842 (1956)
- The Bob Prince Quintet: Dancing with Oh Captain! – Harmony HL 7097 (1958)
- N.Y. Export: Op. Jazz from "Ballets U.S.A." and Ballet Music from Leonard Bernstein's "West Side Story" – Warner Bros. – 1240 (1959)
- Orchestral Moods of a Western Sunset – Warner Bros. – 1259 (1959)
- Charleston 1970 – Warner Bros. – 1276 (1959)
- Saxes Inc. – Warner Bros. – 1336 (1959)
- Events and N.Y Export: Op. Jazz – RCA Victor LPM/LSP-2435 (1961)

=== As arranger and sideman ===
- Johnny Mathis with Johnny Mathis – Columbia CL 887 (1956) arranger
- Far Out, Near In with Johnny Eaton – Columbia CL 996 (1956) vibraphone
- Desmond Blue with Paul Desmond – RCA Victor (1962) arranger
