= Jeannie Linero =

American film and television actress

- Born: August 28, 1945
- Died: October 27, 2005 (aged 60)
- Occupation: Actress
- Years active: 1971–1991

Jeannie Linero (August 28, 1945 – October 27, 2005) was an American film and television actress. She was perhaps best known for playing the role of Lucy Mancini in The Godfather (1972) and The Godfather Part III (1990). Her other film credits included roles in Flush (1977) and the remake Heaven Can Wait (1978).

Linero played the role of Suzy Marta Rocket in the short-lived television series Hot L Baltimore. She made guest appearances on such television series as One Day at a Time, Maude, Chico and the Man, Baretta, All in the Family, Laverne & Shirley, Welcome Back, Kotter, Archie Bunker's Place, Mama's Family, and Hill Street Blues.

== Filmography ==
=== Film ===
Year	Title	Role	Notes
1972	The Godfather	Lucy Mancini	
1977	Flush	Lola	
1978	Heaven Can Wait	Lavinia	
1990	The Godfather: Part III	Lucy Mancini	

=== Television ===
Year	Title	Role	Notes
1971–1976	All in the Family	Nurse/The Waitress/Grocery Clerk	3 episodes
1973	Maude	Sally	1 episode
1975	Hot l Baltimore	Suzy Maria Rocket	13 episodes
1975–1976	Chico and the Man	Liz Garcia, RN	4 episodes
1976	One Day at a Time	Marilyn	1 episode
1976	Baretta	Marisa Delgado	1 episode
1976	Mary Hartman, Mary Hartman	Nurse Ola	1 episode
1977	Laverne & Shirley	Estelle	1 episode
1977	All's Fair	Amanda	2 episodes
1978–1983	ABC Afterschool Specials		2 episodes
1978	Welcome Back, Kotter	Impatient Spanish Woman	1 episode
1980	Sanford	The Woman	1 episode
1981	Archie Bunker's Place	Waitress	1 episode
1981	The Magical World of Disney	Painted Lady	1 episode
1983	Mama's Family	Zenada	1 episode
1983–1985	Hill Street Blues	Maria Perez	2 episodes
1984	Blue Thunder	Madame Eva Parada	1 episode
1984	Steambath	Juanita	1 episode
1985	Berrenger's	Ana Morales	7 episodes
1985	Days of Our Lives	Mrs. Ramirez	3 episodes
1986	Hunter	Irena Morales	1 episode
1991	The New Lassie	Sasa Vasquez	1 episode
