= Terra Wellington =

American actress

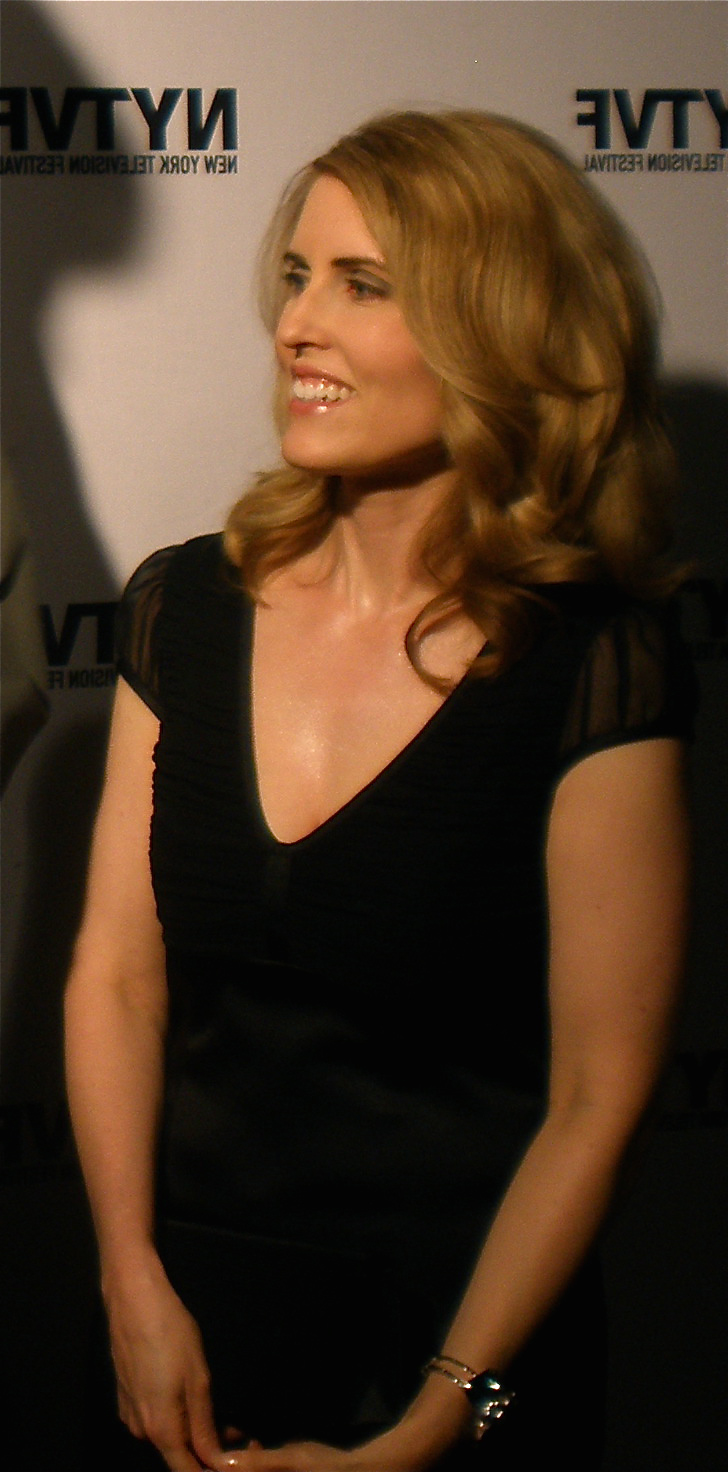
- Wellington at the 2009 New York Television Festival
- Occupations: Actress, Media Personality, Author, Television Host, Environmental Advocate
- Years active: 2004–present
- Website: TerraWellington.com; Terra Wellington IMDb

Terra Wellington is an American actress, writer, and producer. She is also an environmental and wellness advocate, published author, and has been a U.S. columnist and magazine editor.

== Early life ==
Wellington grew up in both the Western U.S. states, principally in Utah and Colorado, and in the Chicago-midwest area in a middle-class family. Her mother worked as a freelance artist and author, though principally raised her children as a full-time homemaker. And her father worked in sales, acted in community theater, and was a celebrated organist and pianist. She learned to play the piano at the age of 5.

Excelling in prose interpretation on the school's speech team, she attended Adlai E. Stevenson High School in Lincolnshire, Illinois, a northern Chicago suburb.

== Career ==
=== Actress ===
Terra’s actor talents have been cultivated through extensive performing and training in Chicago, New York, and Los Angeles. In Los Angeles, she studied Classical acting, the Meisner technique, and spent time at The Second City improvisation center.

Wellington has appeared on the CBS police procedural Criminal Minds and been a series regular in the New York Television Festival's special selection pilot Rx which was a family drama about medical marijuana. She played a supporting role in The Last Days of Toussaint L'Ouverture, an award-winning provocative film that was dedicated to the victims of the 2010 Haiti earthquake. And in 2016 she played the role of Elly's Aunt in "Mississippi Requiem," a black-and-white feature film starring Amy Smart and Topher Grace; the film combined four William Faulkner adapted stories. She also has played the lead in numerous additional independent films.

=== Producer and Writer ===
Wellington is also a feature and television producer and writer, having won and been nominated for awards. She also is a published author.

==== Television and Film ====
Type	Title	Genre	Notes
TV Series	Magnolia Hill	Drama, Fantasy, Thriller	Executive Producer and Writer; Winner "Outstanding Thriller/Horror Series", Catalyst Content Festival (2024) (screenplay); Quarterfinalist - ScreenCraft TV Pilot Script Competition (2023); Quarterfinalist - CineStory TV Retreat and Fellowship Competition (2023), Original Sci-fi/Fantasy Division; PGA Create Finalist (2022)
TV Series	Two Santa Anas	Drama, Fantasy, Sci-fi	Executive Producer and Writer; Official Selection Catalysist Content Festival (Sci-fi/Fantasy category) (2024); Second Rounder in 11th Annual Launch Pad TV Writing Screenplay Competition (2024); Official Selection and Honorable Mention at Big Apple Film Festival and Screenplay Competition (2022)

==== Author ====
Year	Title
2009	The Mom's Guide to Growing Your Family Green: Saving the Earth Begins at Home (St. Martin's Press)
2017	The Reducetarian Solution: How the Surprisingly Simple Act of Reducing the Amount of Meat in Your Diet Can Transform Your Health and the Planet (Chapter Contributor)(TarcherPerigee)

=== Wellness and Eco Spokesperson ===
In 2003, Wellington began appearing on "Good Morning Arizona" on Phoenix, Arizona's KTVK, as well as on KNXV-TV's "Sonoran Living," as a media personality talking about wellness lifestyle topics. This expanded to include dozens of shows across the U.S., including CBS News This Morning, Martha Stewart Living Radio, and the syndicated talk and news program The Daily Buzz.

She was the Wellness Editor for two national women's magazines in 2004–5, REAL and Fit Body. During that time, Terra conducted one of the last media interviews of Actress Wendie Jo Sperber who was known for playing Linda McFly in Back to the Future. Wendie Jo died of cancer in November 2005.

== Charity and campaigning ==
Wellington has been a strong supporter of ocean conservation, the environment, and healthy living campaigns.

== Filmography ==
=== Film ===
Year	Title	Role	Notes
2006	Benjamin Silverstein	Benjamin's Mother	
2007	Trapped	Mrs. Jones	
2007	Sanity Clause	Dana	
2009	Thor's Hammer	Paula	
2009	You and Your Secret	Margaret	
2009	The Last Days of Toussaint L’Ouverture	Mrs. Cafarelli	Film won award of merit at the Accolade Competition
2010	How to Pick Your Shoes	Lilly	
2011	Due	Susan	
2012	Why Me?	Brenda	
2016	Made in America	Liz Wilson	
2017	Pickering Place	Jean Warren	
2018	When Darkness Falls	Laura Quinn	
2018	Mississippi Requiem	Elly's Aunt	
2018	An Adrift Journey	Jessica	
2018	Ismalia	Dr. Davis	
2018	Last Stand	Tara	
2019	The Open Window	Dr. Green	
2019	A Women's Gift	Ivy	
2019	Mouths to Feed	Cecilia Baker	
2019	Three Hundred Days	Lauren	
2020	Afterimages	Ida	

=== Television ===
Year	Title	Role	Notes
2009	Rx	Lauren Greyson	Series Regular. Pilot won best of show for a drama series at the 2009 Accolade Competition; Pilot was special selection at the 2009 New York Television Festival
2011	Criminal Minds	Reporter	Co-star.
