= Last Assassins =

Last Assassins (DC7)
- DVD release
- Directed by: William H. Molina
- Written by: William H. Molina; Charles Philip Moore; Jim Menza; Justin Stanley
- Produced by: Leman Cetiner; Axel Munch; Gunter Heinlein
- Starring: Nancy Allen; Lance Henriksen; Dean Scofield
- Cinematography: William H. Molina
- Edited by: Daniel Loewenthal
- Music by: David Wurst; Eric Wurst
- Distributed by: A-Pix Entertainment
- Release date: April 5, 1997
- Running time: 90 minutes
- Language: English

Last Assassins is the pay-cable, syndication and DVD release title of the 1997 action film Dusting Cliff 7 starring Nancy Allen and Lance Henriksen. The film, which was shot on location in Los Angeles, Vazquez Rocks and Angels Gate Park, was released on DVD in 1998 and repackaged for release in 2010.

The film was originally produced by Silverline Pictures and subsequently distributed internationally by various media distributors.

== Plot ==
The young daughter of a tough, female ex-agent is held ransom for the giving over of a top secret information file which outlines the layout of buried nuclear arms being held as garbage under a government restricted cliff seven in the desert. But to discover this she must go to the area and there, with some unexpected help, encounters the kidnappers in a daring shoot-out finish.

Framed and hunted by a relentless Intelligence force (Lance Henriksen), a female agent (Nancy Allen) with secret nuclear files in her possession must consider a perilous exchange: the stolen documents for her kidnapped daughter.

== Cast ==
- Nancy Allen ... Anna Bishop
- Lance Henriksen ... Colonel Roger McBride
- Scott Lincoln ... Brock Daniels
- Dean Scofield ... Mitch Stevens
- Ashley Buccille ... Carrie Bishop
- Floyd 'Red Crow' Westerman ... Indian Bob Pireegie
- Ron Byron ... Norton
- Carol Crane ... Anna's Mother
- Oliver Darrow ... Oliver Darrow
- Mary Deese ... Angel Martinez
- Kiran Gonsalves ... Assassin #1
- Shashawnee Hall ... Hayes
- Philip Lehl ... Hallman
- Zahn McClarnon ... Indian Louis
- Jim Menza ... Russell
- Dutch Merrick ... Storm Troop Leader (as Steve 'Dutch' Merrick)
- Christopher Landry ... Capt. Belvedere (uncredited)
- Steve Pope ... Concierge

== Reviews ==
VideoHound's Golden Movie Retriever gives the film two bones out of four (May be perfectly delightful for certain tastes. A waste of time for others).

"Dusting Cliff Seven" or "Last Assassins" is one of those films that can entertain for the moments of consumption. But as soon as you think about what you have just seen for a minute, you quickly come to the idea that you have been officially screwed for just 90 minutes. Nevertheless, the film is definitely not a complete failure."

"The camera work on this movie is very good; however, the script is full of holes and seems to be patched together from a variety of movie references. The acting is serviceable, but the continuity is non-existent... If the moviemaker had concentrated more on his script, he could have produced an interesting action adventure. "Dusting Cliff Seven" may go straight to cable."
