= Dinky Hocker =

- ABC Afterschool Special episode
- Episode no.: Season 7 Episode 4
- Based on: Dinky Hocker Shoots Smack by M. E. Kerr
- Original air date: December 12, 1978

"Dinky Hocker" is a 1978 episode of the American television anthology series ABC Afterschool Special, which aired on December 12, 1978. It was based on the 1972 novel Dinky Hocker Shoots Smack by M. E. Kerr.

== Premise ==
The story revolves around its main protagonist, a Los Angeles teen who turns to food as her source of comfort because of the neglect she gets from all circles. That includes her upper-middle-class mother, who is more focused on her charity work at a drug rehabilitation center than on her daughter. Dinky's mother believes that the only way to make Dinky feel better is by feeding her more food, and Dinky feels neglected as a result.

Dinky's desperation to be noticed receives a surprise boost from another teen, P. John, who helps her realize that she needs to be herself. But when her family fails to notice that she wants to change, Dinky takes matters into her own hands.

This ultimately proves effective at a charity event that her mother is involved in. The message gets across to her family, and they finally see that Dinky wants to be accepted as the one thing they failed to notice... a daughter who wants to be loved and not fed with food.

== Comparisons to the novel ==
There were radical changes made to the adaptation of the story. The novel focused more on the observations from a male character, Tucker Woolf, a bookworm who befriends and details the going-ons of the title character and helps her self-esteem while dealing with his own family problems. Tucker's family (his father and journalist mother and an uncle with a drinking problem and an issue with responsibility and commitment) was notably absent from the program. The novel was also more comedic and hinted at some political views, whereas the TV adaptation toned down some of the elements to make it a little more serious, along with the location setting from Brooklyn Heights, New York to Los Angeles.

== Cast ==
- Wendie Jo Sperber as Susan "Dinky" Hocker
- June Lockhart as Helen Hocker
- Alan Oppenheimer as John Hocker
- Jon Walmsley as Tucker Woolf
