= Something More! =

Something More! is a musical with music by Sammy Fain and lyrics by Marilyn Bergman and Alan Bergman. The book by Nate Monaster is based on the 1962 novel Portofino P.T.A. by Gerald Green. Composer Robert Prince contributed some music to a few dance numbers.

== Productions ==
The musical opened on Broadway on October 28, 1964 at the Eugene O'Neill Theatre where it closed on November 21, 1964 after 14 previews and 15 performances. The production was directed by Jule Styne, choreography by Bob Herget, scene/lighting design by Robert Randolph, costume design by Alvin Colt, musical direction by Oscar Kosarin, orchestrations by Ralph Burns, vocal arrangements by Buster Davis, and dance arrangements/orchestrations by Robert Prince.

Cast

The original cast included Arthur Hill (Bill Deems), Barbara Cook (Carol Deems), Joan Copeland (Marchesa Valentina Crespi), Ronny Graham (Monte Checkovitch), Michael Kermoyan (Lepescu), Peg Murray (Mrs. Ferenzi), Rico Froehlich (Joe Santini/Policeman), Victor R. Helou (Tony Santini/Luigi), Paula Kelly (Mrs. Veloz), Jo Jo Smith (Mr. Veloz), Katey O'Brady (Julie/Maria), Hal Linden (Dick), Taylor Reed (The King), Connie Sanchez (The King's Companion), James Lavery (Commandatorre Vermelli), Laurie Franks (Clubwoman) Marilyn Murphy (Gladys), Christopher Man (Tony), Kenny Kealy (Freddy Deems), Neva Small (Suzy Deems), and Eric White (Adam Deems). The ensemble included Joan Bell, Shari Green, Lynn Kollenberg, Mimi Wallace, Bob Bishop, Steve Jacobs, Richard Lyle, Barry Preston, and Bill Starr.

== Musical numbers ==
Act I

- "Something More", Bill Deems
- "Who Fills the Bill", Carol Deems, Suzy Deems, Freddy Deems, Adam Deems, Dick and Committee Members
- "The Straw That Broke the Camel's Back", Bill Deems
- "Better All the Time", Carol Deems
- "Don't Make a Move", Joe Santini and Tony Santini
- "Don't Make a Move (Reprise)", Joe Santini, Tony Santini and Portofino Branch
- "No Questions", Carol Deems
- "Church of My Choice", Monte Checkovitch
- "Jaded, Degraded Am I!", Monte Checkovitch
- "I've Got Nothin' to Do", Carol Deems, Mrs. Ferenzi, Suzy Deems, Freddy Deems and Adam Deems
- "I've Got Nothin' to Do (Reprise)", Mrs. Ferenzi
- "In No Time at All", Marchesa Valentina Crespi
- "The Master of the Greatest Art of All", Lepescu
- "Grazie Per Niente", Monte Checkovitch, Carol Deems, Mr. Veloz, Mrs. Veloz and Guests
- "I Feel Like New Year's Eve", Carol Deems
- "One Long Last Look", Carol Deems

Act 2

- "Ode to a Key", Bill Deems
- "Bravo, Bravo, Novelisto", Bill Deems, Policeman and Luigi
- "Life Is Too Short", Monte Checkovitch and Mrs. Ferenzi
- "Il Lago de Inamoratti", Mr. Veloz, Mrs. Veloz and Ensemble
- "Mineola", Carol Deems
- "Come Sta", Mrs. Ferenzi, Suzy Deems, Freddy Deems, Adam Deems, Maria and Tony
- "Finaletto", Bill Deems and Carol Deems
