= Terror in the Aisles =

1984 film by Andrew J. Kuehn

- Theatrical release poster
- Directed by: Andrew J. Kuehn
- Written by: Margery Doppelt
- Produced by: Andrew J. Kuehn; Stephen Netburn
- Starring: Donald Pleasence; Nancy Allen
- Cinematography: John A. Alonzo
- Music by: John Beal
- Production company: Kaleidoscope Films
- Distributed by: Universal Pictures
- Release date: August 31, 1984 (Limited Release)
- Running time: 84 minutes
- Country: United States
- Language: English
- Box office: $10,004,817

Terror in the Aisles is a 1984 American documentary film about horror films, including slasher films and crime thrillers. The film is directed by Andrew J. Kuehn, and hosted by Donald Pleasence and Nancy Allen. The original music score is composed by John Beal.

== Plot ==
Director Andrew J. Kuehn excerpted brief segments of terror and suspense in a wide variety of horror films and strung them together with added commentary, as well as some enacted narrative, to create a compilation of fright-inducing effects. Halloween actor Donald Pleasence and Dressed to Kill star Nancy Allen provide the commentary on topics such as "sex and terror" (Dressed to Kill, Klute, Ms .45, The Seduction, When a Stranger Calls), loathsome villains (Dracula, Frankenstein, Friday the 13th Part 2, Halloween I & II, Marathon Man, Nighthawks, The Texas Chain Saw Massacre, Vice Squad, Wait Until Dark, What Ever Happened to Baby Jane?), "natural terror" (Alligator, The Birds, The Fly, The Food of the Gods, Frogs, Jaws 1 & 2, Konga, Nightwing), the occult (An American Werewolf in London, Rosemary's Baby, The Exorcist, The Omen, Carrie, The Fog, The Fury, The Howling, Poltergeist, The Shining), cosmic terror (Alien, The Thing, Invasion of the Body Snatchers) and spoofs (Abbott and Costello Meet Frankenstein, Hold That Ghost, The Ghost Breakers, Scared Stiff, Phantom of the Paradise, Saturday the 14th). In one segment of the anthology, legendary filmmaker Alfred Hitchcock presents his concepts of how to create suspense in a clip from Alfred Hitchcock: Men Who Made The Movies. The advertising specifically refers to the movies that the clips are taken from as "terror films" instead of "horror films", and some of the movies used here, such as Marathon Man and Nighthawks, are not considered horror films but were included because their respective villains, Nazi war criminal Dr. Christian Szell (Laurence Olivier) and global terrorist Wulfgar Reinhardt (Rutger Hauer) were considered horrifying. The most recent movie used for the 1984 release was Videodrome, which David Cronenberg brought to theatres in February 1983; the efforts of getting rights to and assembling clips was so extensive that no movies released after that were considered for usage by the documentarians.

== Release ==
The movie was released wide theatrically in the United States by Universal Pictures on October 26, 1984. The movie grossed $10,004,817 at the box office.

== Reception ==
Gene Siskel of the Chicago Tribune gave the movie zero stars out of four, explaining, "Scary movie scenes work best when they're set up by some expository foreplay, which is why this compilation of horrors doesn't really work." Vincent Canby of The New York Times thought the commentary from the hosts was "pretty dumb" and concluded, "Because Terror in the Aisles is composed entirely of climaxes, it has none of its own." Variety called the movie "poorly conceived and executed", adding, "Applying the rapid editing and juxtaposition techniques to a feature-length project results in simply ruining many classic movie sequences rather than preserving them." Kevin Thomas of the Los Angeles Times thought the movie was "often fun" but criticized the "cornball, patently phony audience reaction shots." Richard Combs of The Monthly Film Bulletin called it "The That's Entertainment of horror movies—in other words, its dexterity at pasting together clips from a selection of scaries, old and new, is not matched by a glimmer of the historical awareness, or even filmic appreciation, that would make the exercise worthwhile."

== Home media ==
The movie was released on VHS and CED Videodiscs by MCA Home Video in 1985. On September 13, 2011, the movie was released to digital format as a special feature on the 30th Anniversary Edition Blu-ray of Halloween II (1981). On October 15, 2012, Universal Pictures Home Entertainment released the movie on DVD as part of its Universal Vault Series.

The movie's DVD and Blu-ray release is presented in the same 1.85:1 aspect ratio of its original theatrical release, which also cropped any segments from other movies that were originally produced using the anamorphic process. The number of terror, suspense, horror and thriller movie clips that are featured and shown from in this documentary totaled to seventy-eight clips.

On October 13, 2020, the movie received its own Blu-ray release courtesy of Scream Factory. As with the previous releases, it was presented in its original aspect ratio; unlike the earlier releases, the Blu-ray includes all-new bonus features, including a new interview with Nancy Allen and the alternate broadcast television edit of the movie.

== Archival appearances ==
- Bud Abbott
- Brooke Adams
- Julia Adams
- Ana Alicia
- Alan Arkin
- Susan Backlinie
- Belinda Balaski
- Martin Balsam
- Adrienne Barbeau
- Ralph Bellamy
- Elizabeth Berridge
- Sidney Blackmer
- Nina Blackwood
- Linda Blair
- Wilford Brimley
- Richard Brooker
- Marilyn Burns
- Ellen Burstyn
- Michael Caine
- Veronica Cartwright
- John Cassavetes
- Lon Chaney Jr.
- Lou Costello
- Charles Cioffi
- Joan Crawford
- Richard Crenna
- Jamie Lee Curtis
- Keith David
- Bette Davis
- Brad Davis
- Joan Davis
- Angie Dickinson
- Faye Dunaway
- Griffin Dunne
- Shelley Duvall
- Clint Eastwood
- Morgan Fairchild
- Mia Farrow
- William Finley
- Jane Fonda
- John Gavin
- Jeff Goldblum
- Elliott Gould
- Gerrit Graham
- Cary Grant
- Rosey Grier
- Charles Hallahan
- Gunnar Hansen
- Jessica Harper
- Debbie Harry
- Rutger Hauer
- Wings Hauser
- David Hedison
- Tippi Hedren
- Dustin Hoffman
- Ian Holm
- Season Hubley
- Michael Ironside
- Amy Irving
- Sandy Johnson
- Carol Kane
- Boris Karloff
- Grace Kelly
- Persis Khambatta
- Margot Kidder
- Dana Kimmell
- Adrienne King
- Yaphet Kotto
- Elsa Lanchester
- Stephen Lack
- Martin Landau
- Frank Langella
- Piper Laurie
- Janet Leigh
- Jerry Lewis
- Danny Lloyd
- Lynn Lowry
- Bela Lugosi
- Zoë Tamerlis Lund
- Herbert Marshall
- Dean Martin
- Kevin McCarthy
- Leo McKern
- Vera Miles
- Jason Miller
- Tawny Moyer
- David Naughton
- Kate Nelligan
- Jack Nicholson
- Laurence Olivier
- Heather O'Rourke
- Patricia Owens
- Betsy Palmer
- Gregory Peck
- Anthony Perkins
- Christopher Plummer
- Vincent Price
- Lee Remick
- Kurt Russell
- Roy Scheider
- P. J. Soles
- Sissy Spacek
- Sylvester Stallone
- Harry Dean Stanton
- Amy Steel
- Andrew Stevens
- Catherine Mary Stewart
- Donald Sutherland
- Gary Swanson
- Max von Sydow
- Jessica Tandy
- Rod Taylor
- Robert Walker
- Dee Wallace
- Jessica Walter
- Sigourney Weaver
- Jack Weston
- Billie Whitelaw
- Billy Dee Williams
- James Woods

== Films shown ==
- Dracula (1931)
- Bride of Frankenstein (1935)
- The Ghost Breakers (1940)
- Hold That Ghost (1941)
- The Wolf Man (1941)
- Abbott and Costello Meet Frankenstein (1948)
- Strangers on a Train (1951)
- Scared Stiff (1953)
- Creature from the Black Lagoon (1954)
- This Island Earth (1955)
- To Catch a Thief (1955)
- Tarantula! (1955)
- The Incredible Shrinking Man (1957)
- The Deadly Mantis (1957)
- The Fly (1958)
- Psycho (1960)
- Konga (1961)
- King Kong vs. Godzilla (1962)
- What Ever Happened to Baby Jane? (1962)
- The Birds (1963)
- Wait Until Dark (1967)
- Rosemary's Baby (1968)
- Night of the Living Dead (1968)
- Klute (1971)
- Play Misty for Me (1971)
- Frogs (1972)
- Frenzy (1972)
- Sisters (1972)
- The Thing with Two Heads (1972)
- The Exorcist (1973)
- The Texas Chain Saw Massacre (1974)
- Phantom of the Paradise (1974)
- Bug (1975)
- Jaws (1975)
- Grizzly (1976)
- The Food of the Gods (1976)
- The Omen (1976)
- Marathon Man (1976)
- Carrie (1976)
- Suspiria (1977)
- The Car (1977)
- The Fury (1978)
- Jaws 2 (1978)
- Eyes of Laura Mars (1978)
- Midnight Express (1978)
- Dawn of the Dead (1978, Italy) credited but not in Final Cut
- The Silent Partner (1978)
- Piranha (1978)
- Halloween (1978)
- The Legacy (1978)
- Invasion of the Body Snatchers (1978)
- Alien (1979)
- The Amityville Horror (1979)
- The Brood (1979)
- Prophecy (1979)
- Dracula (1979)
- Nightwing (1979)
- When a Stranger Calls (1979)
- Friday the 13th (1980)
- The Fog (1980)
- The Shining (1980)
- Dressed to Kill (1980)
- Alligator (1980)
- Scanners (1981)
- The Howling (1981)
- The Funhouse (1981)
- Ms .45 (1981)
- Friday the 13th Part 2 (1981)
- The Postman Always Rings Twice (1981)
- An American Werewolf in London (1981)
- Halloween II (1981)
- Nighthawks (1981)
- Saturday the 14th (1981)
- The Seduction (1982)
- Vice Squad (1982)
- Cat People (1982)
- Poltergeist (1982)
- The Thing (1982)
- Alone in the Dark (1982)
- Videodrome (1983)
