= Get Bruce =

- Original film poster
- Directed by: Andrew J. Kuehn
- Produced by: Andrew J. Kuehn
- Starring: Bruce Vilanch; Whoopi Goldberg; Billy Crystal; Bette Midler; Roseanne; Lily Tomlin; Paul Reiser; Nathan Lane; Raquel Welch; Shirley MacLaine; Carol Burnett
- Cinematography: José Louis Mignone
- Edited by: William Flicker, Maureen Nolan
- Music by: Michael Feinstein
- Distributed by: Miramax Films
- Release date: January 24, 1999 (US)
- Running time: 82 minutes
- Country: United States
- Language: English

Get Bruce (sometimes stylized as Get Bruce!) is a 1999 American documentary film starring Bruce Vilanch, Whoopi Goldberg, Robin Williams, Lily Tomlin, Shirley MacLaine, Steven Seagal, Carol Burnett and Michael Douglas. The film is directed by Andrew J. Kuehn.

== Synopsis ==
The film is a tribute to Bruce Vilanch who writes material for celebrities making public appearances, from Oscar hosts and award recipients to Presidents. Vilanch's mother and photos of childhood are shown in the film; in Chicago, he writes for the Tribune and then heads West. Whoopi Goldberg, Billy Crystal, Robin Williams, and Bette Midler talk with him and to the camera about working with Bruce, and we also watch Bruce help others prepare for Liz Taylor's 65th birthday, Bill Clinton's 50th birthday, and an AIDS awards banquet where Vilanch lets his emotions show.

== Appearances ==
Besides Bruce Vilanch, many other personalities appear in the documentary. The film poster highlights the following:

- Whoopi Goldberg
- Billy Crystal
- Bette Midler
- Roseanne
- Lily Tomlin
- Paul Reiser
- Nathan Lane
- Raquel Welch
- Shirley MacLaine
- Carol Burnett

Other personalities in the documentary include: Robin Williams, Michael Feinstein, Florence Henderson, Steven Seagal, Michael Douglas, Danny Harris, Jenifer Lewis, Jeff Margolis, Salma Hayek, Dora Mendoza, Paul Guerro, Michele Lee, George Schlatter, Stephen Pouliot, Susan Futterman, Marc Shaiman, Michael Smith, James Loyce, Don Scotti, Christine Baranski, Tim Curry, Traci Lords, Tom Bergeron, David Copperfield, Margaret Cho, Beverly D'Angelo, Ali MacGraw, Lauren Bacall, Merry Clayton, President Bill Clinton, Hillary Clinton, Ted Danson, Rosie O'Donnell, Patrick Swayze, Elizabeth Taylor, Sigourney Weaver as well as his mother Henne Vilanch and agent Tim Bock.

== Box office ==
The film grossed $43,155 in the domestic market.

== Reception ==
On review aggregator website Rotten Tomatoes, the film holds an approval rating of 71% based on 17 reviews, with an average rating of 6.90/10. On Metacritic, the film holds 61 out of a 100 based on 20 reviews, indicating "generally favorable" reviews.

Stephen Holden of The New York Times called Get Bruce "Endearing, very funny and utterly unpretentious".
