= Peg Murray =

American actress (1924–2020)

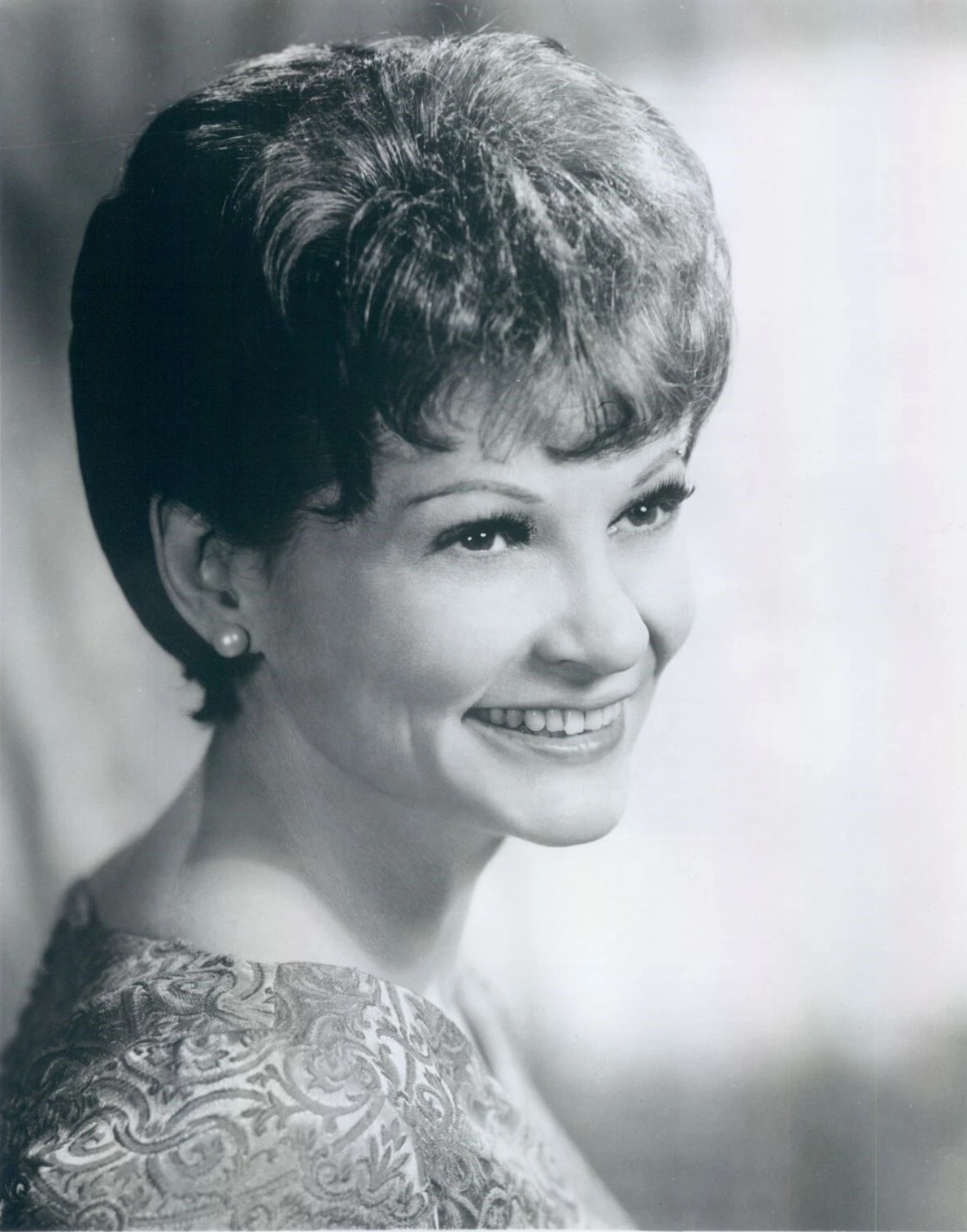
- Murray in 1969
- Born: 14 February 1924; Denver, Colorado, U.S.
- Died: 29 November 2020 (aged 96); New York, U.S.
- Occupation: Actress
- Years active: 1956–1987 (stage)

Margaret L. Murray (February 14, 1924 – November 29, 2020) was an American actress of stage and television. Murray graduated from Case Western Reserve University in Cleveland, then known as Western Reserve College, in 1945.

== Career ==
The Denver, Colorado-born actress, one of three children and the only daughter of John and Helen Murray, won a Tony Award for her performance as the vile "Fräulein Kost" in the original Broadway production of Cabaret (1966). She understudied the role of "Fräulein Schneider", originated by Lotte Lenya, and eventually took over that role full-time when Lenya left the production.

Murray later worked in daytime television, playing the roles of Carrie Johnson Lovett on Love of Life and modeling agent Olga Swenson on All My Children. She also substituted for Constance Ford for several weeks as Ada Hobson on Another World, and starred in the short-lived NBC-TV sitcom Me & Mrs. C. Her film credits included roles in Some of My Best Friends Are... (1971), W.W. and the Dixie Dancekings (1975) and Act of Vengeance (1986).

== Personal life ==
Never married, she was affiliated with the Herstory Writers Group. She lived primarily in New York City and Southold, New York.

Murray died on November 29, 2020, at the age of 96.

== Stage productions ==
- The Great Sebastians (1956)
- Gypsy (1959)
- Blood, Sweat and Stanley Poole (1961)
- She Loves Me (1963)
- Anyone Can Whistle (1964)
- Something More! (1964)
- The Subject Was Roses (1964)
- Cabaret (1966)
- Fiddler on the Roof (1969)
- The Royal Family (1976)
- Cabaret (1987)
