= Flush (film) =

- Directed by: Andrew J. Kuehn
- Produced by: Tom Friedman; Douglas Gardner
- Starring: William Callaway; William Bronder; Jeannie Linero; Pedro Gonzalez Gonzalez; Anthony Palmer; Harvey Solin; Sally Kirkland
- Cinematography: José Louis Mignone
- Edited by: Jeff Werner
- Music by: Mark Snow
- Release date: 1977
- Running time: 90 min.
- Country: United States
- Language: English

Flush is a 1977 American comedy film directed by Andrew J. Kuehn.

== Plot ==
Billionaire William Randolph Hughes has placed several boxes around the American southwest, burying the first box with the instructions, "Each box has instructions to the next," with the promise of his lost fortune at the end. A collection of oddball characters embark on a comedic race to find the boxes and the lost fortune.

== Cast ==
- William Callaway
- William Bronder
- Jeannie Linero
- Pedro Gonzalez Gonzalez
- Harvey Solin
- Sally Kirkland
