= Hot l Baltimore =

1975 American television situation comedy series

- Based on: The Hot l Baltimore by Lanford Wilson
- Developed by: Norman Lear; Rod Parker
- Starring: Richard Masur; Conchata Ferrell; James Cromwell; Al Freeman Jr. Jeannie Linero; Gloria LeRoy; Robin Wilson; Stan Gottlieb; Lee Bergere; Henry Calvert; Charlotte Rae
- Composer: Marvin Hamlisch
- Country of origin: United States
- Original language: English
- No. of seasons: 1
- No. of episodes: 13

Production
- Executive producer: Norman Lear
- Producer: Rod Parker
- Editor: Terry M. Pickford
- Running time: 22 minutes
- Production company: T.A.T. Communications Co.

Original release
- Network: ABC
- Release: January 24 – April 25, 1975

Hot l Baltimore is a 1975 American sitcom created by Norman Lear, adapted from the 1973 off-Broadway play The Hot l Baltimore by Lanford Wilson.

== Premise and run ==
The show takes place in the fictional Hotel Baltimore in Baltimore, Maryland, and draws its title from the cheap establishment's neon marquee which has a burned-out letter "E". The half-hour series premiered January 24, 1975, and was produced by Norman Lear for ABC. It was the first Lear property to air on ABC.

The series had several controversial elements, including two primary characters who were prostitutes, one of whom was an illegal immigrant, and one of the first gay couples to be depicted on an American television series. Because of the subject matter, the show was the first ABC network show to have a warning at its opening, cautioning viewers about mature themes. (All in the Family, also produced by Lear, ran a similar disclaimer when it debuted in 1971 on CBS, but ceased doing so with its second telecast.) The network supported the show and gave it a full publicity campaign, but it failed to win an audience and was canceled after 13 episodes. Its last telecast was June 6, 1975.

This series is notable as the first failure for Lear after a streak of mega-hit TV series, beginning with All in the Family (1971) and continuing with Sanford and Son (1972), Maude (1972), Good Times (1974), and The Jeffersons (1975), the last of which premiered six days before this show. It finished the season in 69th place out of 84 shows with an average 14.7 rating.

== Cast ==
- James Cromwell as Bill Lewis, the hotel's desk clerk
- Richard Masur as Clifford Ainsley, the hotel's young manager
- Conchata Ferrell as April Green, a prostitute who likes Bill
- Jeannie Linero as Suzy Marta Rocket, a prostitute and alien with no legal status
- Al Freeman Jr. as Charles Bingham, a wise, middle-aged man
- Gloria LeRoy as Millie, a daffy waitress
- Robin Wilson as Jackie, a young tomboy runaway
- Stan Gottlieb as Mr. Morse, a grouchy old man
- Lee Bergere as George, a middle-aged gay gentleman
- Henry Calvert as Gordon, George's life partner
- Charlotte Rae as Mrs. Bellotti, an eccentric woman with a never-seen psychotic son

== Episodes ==
No.	Title	Directed by	Written by	Original release date
1	"Suzy's Wedding"	Bob LaHendro	Ron Clark & Rod Parker	January 24, 1975
Suzy announces she is going to marry a Hollywood producer.
2	"Millie's Beau"	Unknown	Rudy De Luca & Barry Levinson	January 31, 1975
Millie's new boyfriend turns out to be one of Suzy's clients. The residents try to figure out a way to tell Millie.
3	"Suzy's New Job"	Bob LaHendro	Woody Kling & David Swift	February 7, 1975
After she loses her job as a dance teacher, Suzy decides to complain to the White House.
4	"The Rent Increase"	Unknown	Barry E. Blitzer & Jack Kaplan	February 14, 1975
Ainsley's mother issues an unexpected rent increase to the tenants. On the verge of being evicted, the residents are moved to protests, with a highly imaginative maneuver by Moose.
5	"George and Gordon"	Burt Brinckerhoff	Woody Kling	February 21, 1975
George and Gordon's latest spat promises to blossom into a hotel-wide fray.
6	"The Date"	Bob LaHendro	Ron Clark	February 28, 1975
Just to prove that he's not afraid of anything, Bill agrees to take April out on a date.
7	"The Deportation of Suzy"	Bob LaHendro	Elias Davis & David Pollock	March 7, 1975
Suzy is threatened with deportation as an undesirable alien.
8	"Mrs. Bellotti's Boyfriend"	Unknown	Charlie Hauck	March 14, 1975
Mrs. Bellotti has fallen deeply in love with Chapman Packer, but her first love is her son Moose, and everything hinges on a very successful meeting of the two men in her life.
9	"Bingham's Con"	Unknown	Jay Sommers	March 21, 1975
Ex-convict Mojo Thompson arrives at the hotel in search of his old buddy Charles Bingham. Mojo soon enthralls the residents with wild tales of his former shenanigans, but in the process he also happens to divulge a few secrets from Charles' past, things Bingham would rather keep dead and buried.
10	"Historic L Baltimore"	Unknown	Douglas Arango & Phil Doran	March 28, 1975
Ainsley's mother has successfully targeted the Hotel Baltimore with the wrecking ball. Hoping to save the building from an untimely demolition, Clifford manages to have it declared a historic landmark. However, the scheme quickly backfires; with the building now more valuable than ever, a Japanese corporation decides to purchase it, but the unlikeliest of residents may prove to be the hotel's ultimate savior.
11	"Ainsley Loves April"	Unknown	Woody Kling	April 4, 1975
An armed gunman invades the hotel lobby and threatens the residents, but is defeated by April. Having witnessed April's heroism, Clifford Ainsley suddenly sees her in a very different light; he falls head over heels in love with her, giving April a rare opportunity to be treated like a queen.
12	"Suzy's Problem"	Unknown	Charlie Hauck	April 11, 1975
Suzy, depressed about turning 30, feels she is wasting her life after contracting a sexually transmitted disease.
13	"Ainsley's Secret"	Unknown	Elias Davis & David Pollock	April 25, 1975
Evie, a woman from Ainsley's past, arrives at the hotel and accuses him of being the father of her child, which he vehemently denies. Ultimately, he agrees to settle the problem with a payoff to Evie. Although he couldn't possibly be the father, the reason he couldn't forms the crux of Ainsley's secret.

== Reception ==
WJZ-TV, then Baltimore's ABC affiliate, opted not to broadcast Hot l Baltimore, stating they were "concerned with the image of our city as shown in the program."
