= Nancy Allen (actress) =

American actress (born 1950)

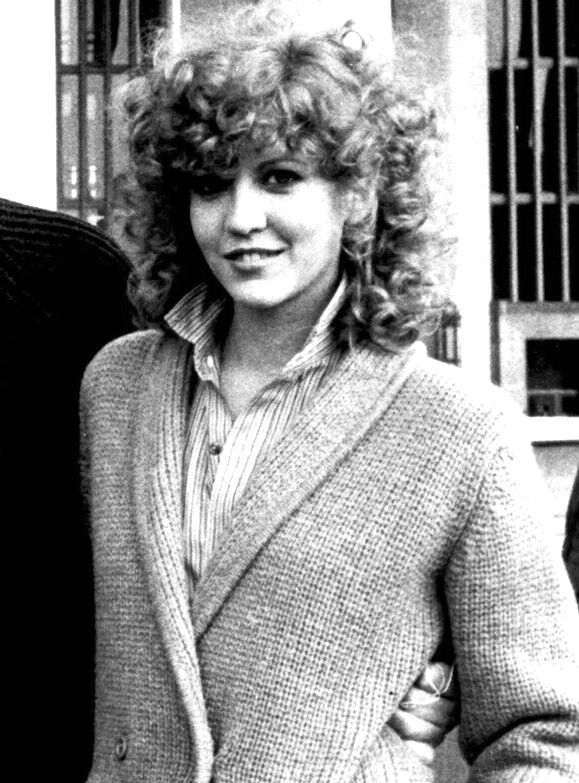
- Allen in 1981
- Born: June 24, 1950 (age 76); The Bronx, New York, U.S.
- Occupation: Actress
- Years active: 1962–2008; 2012–present
- Works: Filmography
- Spouses: Brian De Palma (m. 1979; div. 1984) Craig Shoemaker (m. 1992; div. 1993) Randy Bailey (m. 1998; div. 2007)
- Partner: Michael Paré (1984–1985)
- Relatives: Jim Breuer (first cousin)

Nancy Allen (born June 24, 1950) is an American actress. She came to prominence for her performances in several films directed by Brian De Palma in the 1970s and early 1980s. Her accolades include a Golden Globe Award nomination and three Saturn Award nominations.

Her first major role was as Chris Hargensen in Brian De Palma's film Carrie (1976). She was subsequently cast as the co-lead in the Robert Zemeckis-directed comedy I Wanna Hold Your Hand (1978), followed by a supporting part in Steven Spielberg's 1941 (1979). Her portrayal of a prostitute who witnesses a murder in De Palma's Dressed to Kill (1980) earned her a Golden Globe nomination for New Star of the Year. She then appeared in De Palma's neo-noir film Blow Out (1981), playing a woman implicated in an assassination.

Allen appeared in the science fiction films Strange Invaders (1983) and The Philadelphia Experiment (1984), and Abel Ferrara's television film The Gladiator (1986). Allen garnered mainstream fame playing Anne Lewis in Paul Verhoeven's RoboCop (1987), a role she reprised for RoboCop 2 (1990) and RoboCop 3 (1993). Other credits include Poltergeist III (1988), Limit Up (1990), Les patriotes (1994), and Steven Soderbergh’s Out of Sight (1998).

Allen stepped back from acting in 2008, and became involved in advocacy for cancer patients. In 2010, she was named executive director of the weSPARK Cancer Support Center in Los Angeles.

== Life and career ==
=== 1950–1972: Early life ===
Allen was born on June 24, 1950 in the Bronx borough of New York City, the youngest of three children of Florence (née Breuer) and Eugene Allen, a police lieutenant. Allen was raised on 196th Street in the Pelham Bay section of the Bronx.

Allen was a very shy child, so her mother enrolled her in dance classes when she was four. She attended the Academy of Mount St. Ursula in the Bronx, before the family relocated to Yonkers. Interested in modern dance, she attended the High School of Performing Arts for one year, where she trained for a dancing career. She stated that her experience studying dance "ruined it" for her as it "became all about grades... I discovered that, while I loved to dance, it wasn't my life." She subsequently enrolled at Jose Quintano's School for Young Professionals.

=== 1973–1986: Career beginnings ===
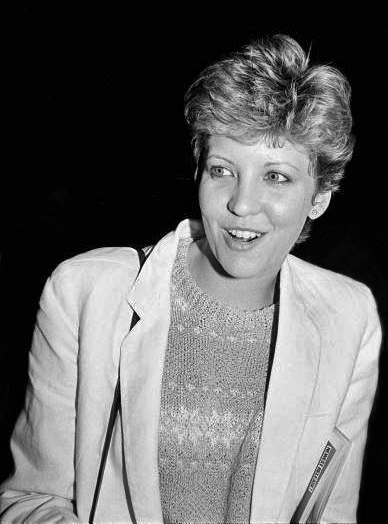
Allen promoting Strange Invaders in 1983

Allen's first major film role was as Nancy, Jack Nicholson's nervous date, in The Last Detail (1973), directed by Hal Ashby. This inspired her to move to Los Angeles to continue her acting career. Initially, Allen struggled to find acting jobs and was told by an agent that, being 25 years old, it "was over for her." However, in November 1975, she auditioned for the role of the spoiled and popular mean girl Christine Hargensen in director Brian De Palma's horror film Carrie (1976), as the title character's chief nemesis. After a protracted casting process (in which Allen was nearly re-cast at the instruction of the producers), she was officially given the role.

Allen next appeared in the role of Pam Mitchell in Steven Spielberg's production of I Wanna Hold Your Hand (1978), which was director Robert Zemeckis's first feature film. She then played Donna Stratton in the Spielberg-directed comedy 1941 (1979).

She married Carrie director Brian De Palma on January 12, 1979, and over the next several years appeared in three more of his films: as Kristina in Home Movies (1980) with Kirk Douglas, followed by her portrayal of prostitute Liz Blake in the thriller Dressed to Kill (1980). For her performance, she was nominated for a Golden Globe for New Star of the Year. She next starred in her last collaboration with De Palma, the neo-noir Blow Out (1981), playing a woman involved in an assassination that is audibly captured by a sound engineer. In filming Blow Out, she had to overcome a lifelong fear of being trapped in a submerging car filling with water.

In 1983, Allen starred as supermarket tabloid reporter Betty Walker in Strange Invaders, written by Bill Condon and co-starring Paul LeMat, Michael Lerner and Oscar winner Louise Fletcher.

She and De Palma divorced in 1984. That same year, two of Allen's films were released, The Buddy System opposite Richard Dreyfuss and Susan Sarandon and The Philadelphia Experiment opposite Michael Paré. For her role in the latter, Allen was nominated for a Saturn Award for Best Actress. Allen began dating Paré after the production. She also hosted the documentary Terror in the Aisles (1984), which presents clips from various horror features, including Dressed to Kill and Carrie. Paul Bartel's Not for Publication and Sweet Revenge, an action caper about white slavery with Gina Gershon and Martin Landau, followed thereafter.

=== 1987–1993: RoboCop and other projects ===
Allen played police officer Anne Lewis in the science fiction/action classic RoboCop (1987). The film, which was the Hollywood debut of Dutch director Paul Verhoeven, did extremely well at the box office. Allen was nominated for another Saturn Award for Best Actress.

After the success of RoboCop, Allen starred in Abel Ferrara's The Gladiator (1987) and as Patricia Wilson-Gardner in Poltergeist III (1988). Allen reprised her role as Officer Lewis in RoboCop 2 (1990). To make her character tougher and more involved in the physical action, she studied martial arts and participated in police training. She recalled the filming of RoboCop 2 as unpleasant, however, and later referred to director Irvin Kershner as a "miserable human being". That same year, Allen top-lined Richard Martini's Limit Up. As commodities trader Casey Falls, Allen showcased her comedic abilities. The lighthearted romp also featured Danitra Vance and blues icon Ray Charles. In 1990, Allen also had the distinction of starring in the first-ever original film made for the Lifetime television network, the highly-rated Memories of Murder.

She married comedian Craig Shoemaker on September 6, 1992. Allen played Officer Lewis a third time in RoboCop 3 (1993) and was nominated for a Saturn Award for Best Supporting Actress. For her third performance as the feisty cop, she worked to soften the usually tough-as-nails demeanor of the character: "You do your job and you become more confident with yourself. Therefore, you don't have to prove yourself to anyone and basically deny your womanhood. (It's) not a dirty word. It's actually an asset. And that's what I wanted to show – to loosen her up in that way." The same year, Allen also appeared with Linda Fiorentino in Acting on Impulse. She and Shoemaker divorced in 1994.

=== 1994–present: Later career; activism ===
Allen has appeared in a number of documentaries about her most famous films, including Dressed to Kill, Carrie, Blow Out, the RoboCop trilogy, and Poltergeist III.

In 1994, she re-teamed with Strange Invaders writer Bill Condon to star as psychic Jessie Gallardo opposite Roger Moore in the movie of the week The Man Who Wouldn't Die. She also had a supporting part in the French drama film Les patriotes (1994). In 1995, she starred in a Broadway production of the play Dial M For Murder by Frederick Knott, which had been the basis for Alfred Hitchcock's film of the same name. It starred John James as Tony Wendice, Nancy Allen as Margot and Roddy McDowall as Inspector Hubbard. It ran from September 26, 1995, to March 10, 1996, and was directed by Edward Hastings. She starred as Linda Savage in Quality Time in 1997, but the film was not released until 2008 due, in part, to post-production and renamed My Apocalypse.

Allen had a small but notable role as Midge in the crime thriller Out of Sight (1998) starring George Clooney and Jennifer Lopez, which was directed by Steven Soderbergh. She also played Rachel Colby in the horror film Children of the Corn 666: Isaac's Return and Madge in the comedy-thriller Kiss Toledo Goodbye with Christopher Walken (both released in 1999). Secret of the Andes, an adventure film starring David Keith and Jerry Stiller, was released in 2000.

Her television guest appearances include roles on Touched by an Angel, The Outer Limits, The Commish, and Law & Order: Special Victims Unit.

In 2008, she decided to shift her focus to providing support for cancer patients and their families. She was inspired to focus her time on the subject after her friend and former co-star Wendie Jo Sperber died of breast cancer in 2005. In December 2010, Allen was named executive director of the weSPARK Cancer Support Center, which was founded by Sperber. Of her work at weSpark, Allen said: "That is what I do. That is what my life is dedicated to. I'm there, I run it. I've created the whole program format and I fundraise. It is my life's work."

== Accolades ==
Year	Award	Category	Nominated work	Result	Ref.
1980	Stinkers Bad Movie Awards	Worst Actress	Dressed to Kill	Nominated	
1981	Golden Globe Award	New Star of the Year in a Motion Picture - Female	Dressed to Kill	Nominated	
1981	Golden Raspberry Award	Worst Actress	Dressed to Kill	Nominated	
1985	Saturn Award	Best Actress	The Philadelphia Experiment	Nominated	
1988	Saturn Award	Best Actress	RoboCop	Nominated	
1994	Saturn Award	Best Supporting Actress	RoboCop 3	Nominated	

== Sources ==
- Abelson, Vicki (February 28, 2017). Nancy Allen on Vicki Abelson's The Road Less Taken. Game Changers (Interview). SoundCloud.
- Bouzereau, Laurent (1988). The De Palma Cut: The Films of America's Most Controversial Director. New York City, New York: Dembner Books. ISBN 978-0-942-63704-5.
- Jackson, Kathi (2007). Steven Spielberg: A Biography. Westport, Connecticut: Greenwood Publishing. ISBN 978-0-313-33796-3.
- Kirshner, Jonathan (2012). Hollywood's Last Golden Age: Politics, Society, and the Seventies Film in America. Ithaca, New York: Cornell University Press. ISBN 978-0-801-46584-0.
- Quigley, Eileen S. (2007). International Television & Video Almanac. Groton, Massachusetts: Quigley Publishing Company. ISBN 978-0-900-61081-3.
- Quinlan, David (1997). The Film Lover's Companion: An A to Z Guide to 2,000 Stars and the Movies They Made. Seacaucus, New Jersey: Carol Publishing. ISBN 978-0-806-51892-3.
- Young, R. G., ed. (2000). The Encyclopedia of Fantastic Film: Ali Baba to Zombies. New York: Applause Books. ISBN 978-1-55783-269-6.
