= The Gladiator (1986 film) =

- VHS cover
- Genre: Action; Drama; Thriller
- Screenplay by: William Bleich
- Story by: William Bleich; Tom Schulman; Jeffrey Walker
- Directed by: Abel Ferrara
- Starring: Ken Wahl; Nancy Allen; Brian Robbins; Robert Culp; Stan Shaw; Rick Dees
- Music by: David Frank
- Country of origin: United States
- Original language: English

Production
- Executive producers: Michael Chase Walker; Jeffrey Walker; Tom Schulman
- Producer: Robert Lovenheim
- Cinematography: James Lemmo
- Editor: Herbert H. Dow
- Running time: 104 minutes
- Production companies: Walker Brothers Productions; New World Pictures

Original release
- Network: ABC
- Release: February 3, 1986

The Gladiator is a vigilante action television film directed by Abel Ferrara and starring Ken Wahl, Nancy Allen and Brian Robbins. Although originally intended for theatrical release, the film was purchased by Showtime Networks and premiered as an ABC Movie of the Week on February 3, 1986.

== Plot ==
A homicidal maniac is on the loose in Los Angeles, killing motorists at random with his "death car". After losing his brother Jeff to the twisted assassin known as "Skull", Rick Benton takes it upon himself to hunt down the reckless drivers that fill the streets at night. Being a master mechanic, Rick spends his time converting his pick-up truck into an armed and dangerous vehicle. He gains the speed and strength to rival other fast cars and individuals. The cops soon find out about the vigilante known only as the "Gladiator" and do all they can to catch him before his citizen's arrests go one step too far.

== Cast ==
- Ken Wahl as Rick Benton / the Gladiator
- Nancy Allen as Susan Neville
- Brian Robbins as Jeff Benton
- Robert Culp as Lieutenant Frank Mason
- Stan Shaw as Joe Barker
- Rosemary Forsyth as Loretta Simpson
- Bart Braverman as Dan
- Rick Dees as Garth Masters
- Michael Young as Reporter
- Garry Goodrow as Cadillac Drunk
- Robert Phalen as Dr. Maxwell
- Linda Thorson as Woman in Class
- Harry Beer as Franklin

== Reception ==
In a review for the website FilmInk, Erin Free writes:

"Despite the fact that it is now largely forgotten (even by Abel Ferrara completists), The Gladiator is a somewhat dour but still gripping urban drama thriller that rises above its drawbacks (that musical score, an occasionally preachy tone on issues of road responsibility) through rich characterisation, imaginative action set-pieces, a winningly gritty sensibility, and strong performances."
