= Wendie Jo Sperber =

American actress (1958–2005)

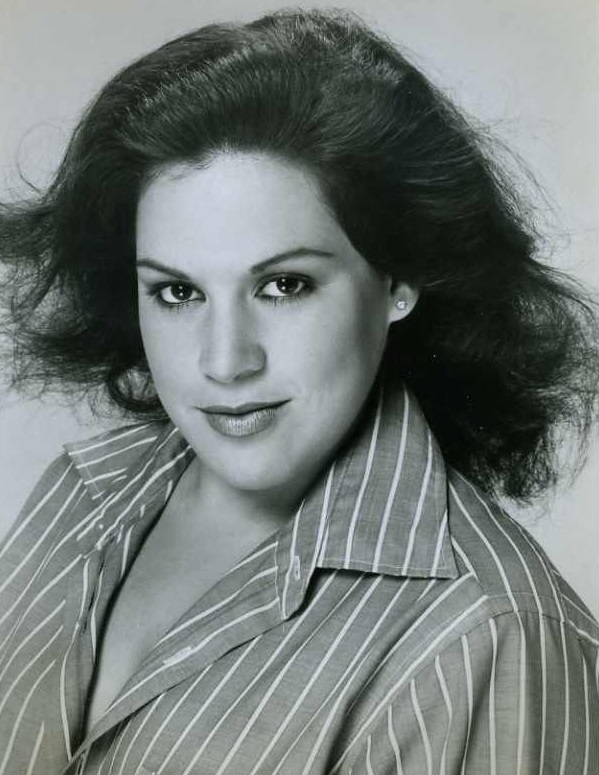
- Sperber in 1981
- Born: September 15, 1958; Hollywood, California, U.S.
- Died: November 29, 2005 (aged 47); Los Angeles, California, U.S.
- Resting place: Mount Sinai Memorial Park
- Occupation: Actress
- Years active: 1978–2005
- Spouse: Richard Velasquez (m. 1983; div. 1994)
- Children: 2

Wendie Jo Sperber (September 15, 1958 – November 29, 2005) was an American actress, known for her performances in the films I Wanna Hold Your Hand (1978), Bachelor Party (1984), and Back to the Future (1985), as well as the television sitcoms Bosom Buddies (1980–1982) and Private Benjamin (1982–1983).

== Early life ==
Sperber was born in Hollywood, Los Angeles, the daughter of Burton Seymour Sperber and Charlene Marie (née Hirshon). She had three siblings: Ellice, Michelle and Richard. Sperber was Jewish.

== Career ==
Sperber began her screen career at age 19 when she was cast in the small role of Kuchinsky in Matthew Robbins' 1978 teen movie Corvette Summer, alongside Mark Hamill and Annie Potts. She next appeared in Robert Zemeckis' period comedy I Wanna Hold Your Hand, as Rosie Petrofsky. (Entertainment Weekly described Rosie as "a screaming Beatlemaniac who, among other things, climbed through elevator shafts").

She played the title role in the television movie Dinky Hocker, an ABC Afterschool Special which dealt with a teenager's attempts to hide her feelings by eating. Sperber's physical comedy is featured in Steven Spielberg's 1941. Zemeckis, who also worked on 1941, brought her back to the big screen in 1980 with a role in his comedy Used Cars, but it was on television that year that Sperber began to receive more serious attention.

She was cast in the role of Amy Cassidy in the series Bosom Buddies, starring Tom Hanks and Peter Scolari. Following the show's cancellation in 1982, Sperber worked for a year on the series Private Benjamin. She then resumed her feature work in the 1984 Tom Hanks theatrical vehicle Bachelor Party, directed by Neal Israel. Israel cast her again in Moving Violations in 1985. That same year, she appeared as Linda McFly in Zemeckis's Back to the Future. She reprised her role as Linda in Back to the Future Part III.

Following Back to the Future, Sperber returned to television and starred in Babes, a comedy about three overweight sisters; but the series was cancelled after one season. In 1994, Sperber was cast in a major supporting part in the CBS television series Hearts Afire. In 1998, she guest starred as April, the cleaning lady and Grace's muse, on the twelfth episode of Will & Grace. Her last work was voicing a character on the animated TV series American Dad (episode titled "Roger 'n' Me") that aired in 2006, after her death.

== Advocacy ==
In addition to her work on TV and movies, Sperber also was the founder of weSPARK Cancer Support Center, an independent organization formed in 2001 to advance and help support individuals and their families fighting various forms of cancer through free emotional support, information and social events/activities. In addition to being the founder, Sperber also served on the board of directors and wrote the quarterly newsletter. According to one of the last known interviews with Sperber by Terra Wellington, the weSPARK organization was her key cause and effort in the last year of her life with her stating "The whole idea of weSPARK's programming was that I didn't want people to walk into a room and have a therapist ask how they feel. I wanted peer support."

== Personal life and death ==
Sperber married producer Richard Velasquez in 1983. They divorced in 1994. They had two children, Preston and Pearl.

In 1997, Sperber was diagnosed with breast cancer, which seemed to go into remission following treatment. She revealed in April 2002 that the cancer had metastasized throughout her body, and by mid-2004 she had undergone experimental brain radiation therapy. She continued to work in television and movies during this period, including episodes of Unhappily Ever After, Home Improvement, Will & Grace, Grounded for Life, and the movies Desperate but Not Serious (1999) and Sorority Boys (2002).

She died from breast cancer on Tuesday, November 29, 2005, aged 47, at her home in Los Angeles, California.

== Filmography ==
Film
Year	Title	Role	Notes
1978	I Wanna Hold Your Hand	Rosie Petrofsky	
1978	Corvette Summer	Kuchinsky	
1978	Grease	Dancer	Uncredited
1979	1941	Maxine Dexheimer	
1980	Used Cars	Nervous Nona	
1983	The First Time	Eileen	
1984	Bachelor Party	Dr. Tina Gassko	
1985	Moving Violations	Joan Pudillo	
1985	Back to the Future	Linda McFly	
1986	Stewardess School	Jolean Winters	
1987	Delta Fever	Claire	
1990	Back to the Future Part III	Linda McFly	
1994	Mr. Write	Roz	
1994	Love Affair	Helen	
1995	Mr. Payback: An Interactive Movie	Woman With Kitten	
1996	Big Packages		
1999	Desperate but Not Serious	Landlady	
2000	Pissed	Wendy	
2002	Sorority Boys	Professor Bendler	
2003	My Dinner with Jimi	Louella	
2010	Take 22: Behind the Scenes of Sequestered	Cece	(final film role)

Television
Year	Title	Role	Notes
1979	ABC Afterschool Special	Susan 'Dinky' Hocker	Episode: Dinky Hocker
1980	The Stockard Channing Show	Wendy Simon	Episode: "Life Begins at 30"
1980–1982	Bosom Buddies	Amy Cassidy	
1981	Knots Landing	Ellie	Episode: "Step One"
1982–1983	Private Benjamin	Pvt. Stacy Kouchalakas	Season 3
1985	Brothers	Connie	Episode: "Life's Too Short to Be Delicate"
1987–1988	Women in Prison	Pam	
1989	Designing Women	Estelle Rhinehart	Episode: "The Women of Atlanta"
1990	The Image	Anita Cox	TV movie
1990	Who's the Boss?	Lori	Episode: "Micelli's Marauders"
1990–1991	Babes	Charlene Gilbert	
1991	Harry and the Hendersons	Leslie Worth	Episode: "George's White Light"
1991	Married... with Children	Sandy Jorgenson	Episode: "I Who Have Nothing"
1992	Parker Lewis Can't Lose	Carol	2 Episodes
1992	Dinosaurs	Wendy Richfield	Episode: "Hungry for Love"
1992–1993	Hearts Afire	Mavis Davis	Season 1
1994	Fortune Hunter	Nadine	Episode: "Triple Cross"
1995	Kirk	Saleswoman	Episode – "S'Wonderbra"
1995	The Return of Hunter	Lucille	TV movie
1997	You Wish	Margo	Episode: "A Real Don Juan"
1998	Murphy Brown	Ann	Episode: "Bad Hair Day"
1999	Will and Grace	April	Episode: "My Fair Maid-y"
1999	Unhappily Ever After	Ms. Snaylops	Episode: "The Artist and the Con Artist"
1999	Maggie	Dr. Scott	Episode: "Don't Quit Your Day Job"
1999	Home Improvement	Sue	Episode: "The Long and Winding Road (Part 1)"
2000	Bette	Penny	Episode: "A Method to Her Madness"
2002	8 Simple Rules	Rachel	4 Episodes
2003	JAG	Landlady	Episode: "Standards of Conduct"
2003	Touched by an Angel	Tricia	Episode: "And a Nightingale Sang"
2005	Grounded for Life	Mrs. Robinson	Episode: "The Letter(s)"
2006	American Dad!	Old Lady/Wendie Jo (Voice)	Episode: "Roger & Me"
