= Secret of the Andes (film) =

- Directed by: Alejandro Azzano
- Written by: Alejandro Azzano; Bernardo Nante
- Starring: Roshan Seth; Camilla Belle; David Keith; Nancy Allen; John Rhys-Davies; Jerry Stiller
- Cinematography: Máximo Munzi
- Edited by: Miguel Pérez
- Music by: Luis Enrique Bacalov
- Production companies: Semana Mágica S.A. Instituto Nacional de Cine y Artes Audiovisuales (INCAA)
- Distributed by: Distribution Company (1999, Argentina); MTI Home Video (VHS, United States)
- Release date: November 14, 1998
- Running time: 101 minutes 95 minutes
- Countries: Argentina; United States
- Languages: English; Spanish

Secret of the Andes (El secreto de los Andes) is a 1998 Argentine-American fantasy adventure film co-written and directed by Alejandro Azzano. It stars Roshan Seth as a powerful shaman, Camilla Belle as a nine-year old young girl with unusual gifts, David Keith as her archaeologist father, Nancy Allen as her mother and John Rhys-Davies as a Catholic priest.

== Synopsis ==
When Diana's behavior causes her to be suspended from her school in New York City, her mother takes her to join her father, an archaeologist working in a village in the Andes. He is looking for the missing half of the golden disc of Huáscar, which legend says can grant eternal life. Diana meets the local shaman and discovers her own mystical powers.

== Cast ==
- Camilla Belle as Diana Willings
- David Keith as Brooks Willings
- Nancy Allen as Brenda Willings
- Roshan Seth as Don Benito
- John Rhys-Davies asFather Claver
- Jerry Stiller as Dr. Goldfisch
- José Luis Alfonzo as Lázaro
- Gianni Lunadei
- Rodrigo Barrena as Sancho Benito
- Betiana Blum as Mama Lola
- Leandro López as Lucho Benito

== Critical response ==
The critical reception was mostly negative in the Argentine press. Adolfo C. Martínez wrote in La Nación, that the "script is so lacking in imagination that it does not withstand the slightest analysis. If those responsible thought that this story contained fascination, magic and suspense, they mistook their purposes. If they conceived it for children, they missed their target, since that audience will undoubtedly achieve an invitation to yawn. If it was thought for the elderly, no one in adulthood can bow to the absurdity that is told on the screen". Juan Villegas, from the El Amante del Cine magazine wrote that "there was an exciting story to be told, but they forgot to shoot it".

== Accolades ==
Secret of the Andes won a silver Remi in the 2000 edition of the WorldFest-Houston International Film Festival. The movie was also nominated to best film in the 1998 edition of the Mar del Plata International Film Festival.
