= The Patriots (French film) =

- Theatrical release poster
- Directed by: Éric Rochant
- Written by: Éric Rochant
- Starring: Yvan Attal
- Cinematography: Pierre Novion
- Edited by: Pascale Fenouillet
- Music by: Gérard Torikian
- Production company: Gaumont
- Distributed by: Gaumont Buena Vista International
- Release date: 1 June 1994
- Running time: 138 minutes
- Country: France
- Language: French
- Budget: $11 million
- Box office: $2.4 million

The Patriots (French: Les patriotes [le patʁiˈjɔt]) is a 1994 French film by director Éric Rochant about a young Frenchman who is recruited by the Israeli secret services and used for missions, first in France and then in the USA. The film was entered into the 1994 Cannes Film Festival.

== Plot ==
Leaving his family in France, young Ariel Brenner goes to Israel and is recruited by the Mossad. After training, he is part of a team sent to Paris to entrap a French nuclear scientist who is working on plans for a power plant in a Middle Eastern country (a fictionalised version of the Osirak site in Iraq). While the scientist's co-operation is secured through blackmail, using a delightful call-girl who Ariel recruits named Marie-Claude, his Arab counterpart refuses, despite Marie-Claude's charms, and is assassinated. To the alarm of their US allies, the Israeli armed forces then bomb the plant out of existence. An American intelligence operative in Washington named Jeremy Pelman (a fictionalised Jonathan Pollard) is sympathetic to the Israeli cause and through Ariel offers to feed them useful information. As a spy he is not very competent, sharing everything with his wife, and when he comes under suspicion from his superiors, tries to defect. The Israelis, to avoid further alarm from their allies, hand him back. Back in Israel, Ariel is on surveillance at the airport when Marie-Claude happens to fly in. He takes her into an office, locks the door and pulls down the blinds.

== Cast ==
- Richard Masur - Jeremy Pelman
- Yvan Attal - Ariel Brenner
- Allen Garfield - Eagleman
- Yossi Banai - Yossi
- Nancy Allen - Catherine Pelman
- Maurice Bénichou - Yuri
- Emmanuelle Devos - Rachel
- Hippolyte Girardot - Daniel
- Moshe Ivgy - Oron
- Sandrine Kiberlain - Marie-Claude
- Bernard Le Coq - Bill Haydon
- Christine Pascal - Laurence
- Jean-François Stévenin - Remy Prieur
- Éva Darlan - Madame Prieur
- Dan Toren - Ran Ostrovitch
- Myriem Roussel - Laurence's friend
