= Memories of Murder (1990 film) =

1990 film by Robert Lewis

- VHS and DVD cover
- Genre: Action; Crime; Thriller
- Teleplay by: John Harrison; Nevin Schreiner
- Story by: John Harrison
- Directed by: Robert Lewis
- Starring: Nancy Allen; Vanity; Robin Thomas
- Theme music composer: Joseph Conlan
- Country of origin: United States
- Original language: English

Production
- Producer: Robert Michael Lewis
- Editor: Brian Q. Kelley
- Running time: 104 minutes
- Production companies: Houston Lady Productions; Viacom Productions

Original release
- Network: Lifetime Television Network
- Release: July 31, 1990

Memories of Murder (also known as Passing through Veils) is a 1990 American action–crime television film starring Nancy Allen, directed by Robert Lewis and written by John Harrison.

Memories of Murder is the first of many original films that would be produced for the Lifetime Television Network, and, due to its popularity, would subsequently be released on VHS and DVD on July 31, 1990. Actress Vanity co-stars. The film was shot in British Columbia.

== Plot ==
Jennifer (Nancy Allen) is a woman who is suffering from amnesia to the extent that she does not even recognize her husband and daughter. Extremely confused and tormented, she desperately seeks to piece together her life and, in doing so, stumbles upon some startling secrets from her shadowy past. She discovers that a female killer connected to her from her earlier life is intent on stalking her and seeking revenge by killing her and her family.

== Cast ==
- Nancy Allen as Jennifer Gordon/Corey
- Vanity as Carmen
- Robin Thomas as Michael
- Nick Benedict as Mr. Bates
- Olivia Brown as Brenda
- Linda Darlow
- Don S. Davis
- Jerome Eden as Store Manager
- Robyn Simons as Amy

== Critical reception ==
Chris Willman of the Los Angeles Times called the film "amazingly pedestrian" in terms of its mystery. Daniel Ruth of the Chicago Sun-Times wrote that he "couldn't keep track" of what was happening in the plot. Ken Tucker of the Entertainment Weekly gave it a "D" grade, saying, "Memories of Murder is full of romance-novel dialogue".
