= I Wanna Hold Your Hand (film) =

1978 film by Robert Zemeckis

- Theatrical release poster
- Directed by: Robert Zemeckis
- Written by: Robert Zemeckis; Bob Gale
- Produced by: Tamara Asseyev; Alexandra Rose
- Starring: Nancy Allen; Bobby Di Cicco; Marc McClure; Susan Kendall Newman; Theresa Saldana; Wendie Jo Sperber
- Cinematography: Donald M. Morgan
- Edited by: Frank Morriss
- Music by: The Beatles
- Distributed by: Universal Pictures
- Release date: April 21, 1978
- Running time: 99 minutes
- Country: United States
- Language: English
- Budget: $2.8 million
- Box office: $1.9 million

I Wanna Hold Your Hand is a 1978 American historical comedy film directed by Robert Zemeckis, written by Zemeckis and Bob Gale, and starring Nancy Allen, Bobby Di Cicco, Marc McClure, Susan Kendall Newman, Theresa Saldana, Eddie Deezen, and Wendie Jo Sperber. Its storyline follows a disparate group of teenagers over the course of one day in New York City as they attempt to gain entry to the Beatles' first live appearance on The Ed Sullivan Show on February 9, 1964. The film also examines the mass hysteria surrounding the event, dubbed "Beatlemania" for the fervency of the group's fans. The film's title is derived from the Beatles' 1963 song of the same name.

The film marked Zemeckis's feature film directorial debut, and was also the first film to be executive-produced by Steven Spielberg. In order to get Universal to finance the low budget film, Spielberg had to promise studio executives that if Zemeckis appeared to be doing a poor job as first time director, he would step in and direct the film himself.

I Wanna Hold Your Hand was released by Universal Pictures on April 21, 1978. Despite positive previews and critical response, the film was not a financial success and was considered a box office flop, unable to recoup its rather modest $2.8 million budget. The film is now regarded as a cult classic.

== Plot ==
In February 1964, the Beatles will make their debut performance on Ed Sullivan's show, which broadcasts out of New York City. In Maplewood, New Jersey, Janis, a folk music devotee, detests the Beatles, unlike her friends Rosie and Pam. Janis's other friend, Grace, wants to rent a limousine, pull up to the Beatles' hotel and get exclusive photos of the band. The girls recruit Larry DuBois, a teen whose father has access to limos. While traveling to New York City, they are joined by Tony, a teen who also hates the Beatles.

On the morning of February 9, the group pulls up at the hotel, which is already surrounded by screaming teenagers. Grace, Rosie, and Pam sneak inside, while Larry, Tony and Janis remain in the limo.

Grace and Rosie sneak into a service elevator, while Pam hides in a basement closet and sees the group leaving to rehearse in the Ed Sullivan Theater. Grace gets off on the 11th floor, while Rosie goes up to the Beatles' rooms. While evading security, she runs into Richard Klaus, a fellow Beatles fan. They are soon caught and tossed from the hotel, after which the two quarrel and go their separate ways. While hiding in a food cart, Pam is taken to the Beatles' room. Seeing their clothes and instruments, she revels in a moment of euphoria. When the Beatles return to the room, Pam hides under John’s bed.

Grace goes to the theater, where a guard says that for fifty dollars he can let her in backstage. Larry asks her to the Valentine's Day dance at school, but she ignores him, still fixated on getting the pictures. To get the money, she decides to take the place of a prostitute who has a client in the hotel. Once in his room, she instead hides and takes photos of the man with the sex worker, planning to blackmail him for the money. He gives Grace $50 and then attacks her, but Larry, who has been getting tipsy in the hotel bar, then appears, knocks out the man and rescues Grace.

In front of the hotel, Janis befriends Peter, a boy with a Beatles hairstyle who is determined to see the show. His dad has three tickets to get in, but refuses to give them to Peter unless he gets a haircut. Janis recruits Tony to steal from Peter's dad. Her plan works out, with Peter, Janis and Tony getting one ticket each. While Janis wants simply to help Peter see the show and be himself, Tony is planning to find a way to stop the TV broadcast.

Meanwhile, a radio DJ is giving out tickets to listeners who can correctly answer trivia questions about the Beatles. After several failed attempts, Rosie makes it to a phone, calls in with the right answer and wins two tickets. Pam gets caught, but is treated kindly by the Beatles' staff and even gets interviewed by the press. Eddie, her fiancé, arrives to pick her up. Realizing she is not ready to get married, Pam leaves him behind and runs to the theater, using a ticket that the Beatles' road manager Neil Aspinall gave her.

Before the Beatles go onstage, Tony grabs a fire axe from a doorway and goes to the theater's roof, climbing the transmitter to sabotage the broadcast. Janis tries to stop Tony, who is dead set in his plan until lightning from a storm knocks him from the transmitter.

Larry parks the limo in the alley behind the theater and Grace reaches the back door. However, a policeman catches Larry, deciding to arrest him for improper parking and driving without a license. Grace runs back and uses the $50 to bribe the cop into letting Larry go. Now without the money to get backstage, she is temporarily disconsolate, but soon accepts Larry's offer to go to the dance.

While leaving the theater, the Beatles take a wrong turn and end up in Larry's limo. As a mob of fans approaches, Larry drives off with the Beatles still in the back seat, and Grace gets to snap her photos.

== Cast ==
- Nancy Allen as Pam Mitchell
- Bobby Di Cicco as Tony Smerko
- Marc McClure as Larry Dubois
- Susan Kendall Newman as Janis Goldman
- Theresa Saldana as Grace Corrigan
- Wendie Jo Sperber as Rosie Petrofsky
- Eddie Deezen as Richard "Ringo" Klaus
- Christian Juttner as Peter Plimpton
- Will Jordan as Ed Sullivan
- Richard Singer as voice of George Harrison
- Read Morgan as Peter's Father
- Claude Earl Jones as Al
- James Houghton as Eddie
- James Hewitson as Neil
- Dick Miller as Sergeant Brenner
- Kristine DeBell as Cindy the hooker
- Mary Hudson as Girl in crowd
- Murray the K as himself
- Leslie Hoffman stunt double for Wendie Jo Sperber

== Production ==
Studio executive Ned Tanen was pitched a script for the film by Bob Gale and Robert Zemeckis, but he reacted aggressively. Tanen accused the two of attempting to produce an antisemitic work. Later Gale and Zemeckis named the antagonist character of the Back to the Future franchise "Biff Tannen" after him.

== Reception ==
I Wanna Hold Your Hand holds a rating of 90% on Rotten Tomatoes based on 29 reviews with an average rating of 6.8/10. The consensus states: "Its slapstick humor and familiar plot don't break any new ground, but I Wanna Hold Your Hand succeeds at recapturing the excitement of a pivotal cultural moment".

Janet Maslin of The New York Times wrote, "The gimmick behind 'I Wanna Hold Your Hand' is the fact that you never actually see the Beatles; the genius of the film is that you never miss them ... the sneakiness with which the neophyte director Robert Zemeckis skirts the issue is positively dazzling. The Beatles are both there and not there, and the paradox hardly even matters. This movie is about the fans and their hysteria, and so it's the shouts that count". Variety wrote that "the film's early development is too slow and the humor initially too broad. But it develops into a lively entertainment with many memorable lines and scenes. The film's biggest problem, the fact that The Beatles can't be shown, is turned into its greatest asset through Zemeckis' creativity". Gene Siskel gave the film three-and-a-half stars out of four and called it "nonstop good fun" and "the perfect summer film". (Years later, while giving a moderately positive review of Tom Hanks's 1996 directorial effort That Thing You Do on his TV review program with Roger Ebert, Siskel would cite I Wanna Hold Your Hand as a better treatment of the same kind of story than Hanks's film.)

Kevin Thomas of the Los Angeles Times described it as "exceedingly broad and boisterous", with "a clever premise, sturdy enough to aspire to American Graffiti's perceptive nostalgia, but the film zeroes in relentlessly at the widest, least discriminating audience possible. The byproduct of aiming so low so steadfastly is a dose of sheer crassness that frequently overpowers the film's buoyant energy and sense of fun". Gary Arnold of The Washington Post called the film "Inconsistent but zestful", adding that "Zemeckis begins building up a head of steam and never entirely loses it, although the episodic script is an up-and-down, hit-and-miss proposition". Scott Meek of The Monthly Film Bulletin wrote that "certain scenes are successful and amusing... but the film rushes so desperately from one joke to the next that it never has more to offer than occasional moments of somewhat lumbering charm". David Thomson called it "inventive and human", praising the premise as "a simple, lovely idea for a crazy group comedy."

Zemeckis later said, "One of the great memories in my life is going to the preview. I didn't know what to expect [but] the audience just went wild. They were laughing and cheering. It was just great. Then we learned a really sad lesson... just because a movie worked with a preview audience didn't mean anyone wanted to go see it".

== Soundtrack ==
The soundtrack features 17 original Beatles recordings:

1. "I Want to Hold Your Hand"
2. "Please Please Me"
3. "I Saw Her Standing There"
4. "Thank You Girl"
5. "Boys"
6. "Twist and Shout"
7. "Misery"
8. "Till There Was You"
9. "Love Me Do [Album version]"
10. "Do You Want to Know a Secret?"
11. "P.S. I Love You"
12. "Please Mister Postman"
13. "From Me to You"
14. "Money (That's What I Want)"
15. "There's a Place"
16. "I Wanna Be Your Man"
17. "She Loves You"

The song "She Loves You" was featured twice toward the end of the film. The first time was during the group's appearance on The Ed Sullivan Show on February 9, 1964. For this sequence, stand-in Beatle lookalikes, dressed in identical attire and holding musical instruments in a similar manner, were seen mimicking the group's performance of the song from that show while being shown on the stage floor, albeit from a distance so as not to see their identities. The actual footage of the Beatles was revealed from the camera operator's point of view. These two elements were combined with reactions from the studio audience to recreate a historic moment in time. The second use of "She Loves You" came during the end credits.

Other songs by the Beatles, published years after their appearance on The Ed Sullivan Show, are referenced as in-jokes throughout the film. They are:

1. "Helter Skelter", mentioned by an aristocratic woman who sojourns at the Beatles' hotel ("Things are all helter skelter!");
2. "Get Back", mentioned by a cop trying to calm a riot against his arrest of a very young Beatles fan ("Get back girls, get back!");
3. "One After 909", "909" being the number of the hotel room of a man who is searching for a hooker in New York;
4. "Norwegian Wood (This Bird Has Flown)", mentioned by a member of the Beatles' staff named Neil (probably a reference to the Beatles' road manager and personal assistant Neil Aspinall) while speaking to a cop after Pam has been discovered lying under John Lennon's bed ("Is that the bird that was under Lennon's bed?", a reference to a widespread interpretation that sees in "Norwegian Wood (This Bird Has Flown)" a confession of adultery). 'Bird' is slang for a young woman.
5. "Girl", once again during the scene in which Pam is discovered: the cop does not get the aforementioned "bird" allusion, and Neil promptly states: "Girl"; to make this reference even clearer, the cop answers: "Girl, girl" (mimicking the chorus of the song). Noticeably, as the dialogue goes on, Neil speaks about an arrangement he made with Brian (a reference to the real Beatles' manager Brian Epstein) concerning how to handle the situation with the press.

== Home media ==
The film was released on VHS and LaserDisc by Warner Home Video in 1989, under license from MCA Home Video. It was released in the United Kingdom on DVD and Blu-ray by Fabulous Films Limited in 2016. In the United States it was released by The Criterion Collection on March 26, 2019, under license from Universal Pictures Home Entertainment.
