= Neva Small =

American actress

- Born: New York City, U.S.
- Occupations: Actress, singer
- Years active: 1963–present
- Known for: Chava in Fiddler on the Roof (1971 film)
- Spouse: Dr. Fred Fenig

Neva Small is an American theatrical, film, and television actress and singer. She made her singing debut at the age of 10 at the New York City Opera, and her Broadway debut the following year. She has numerous acting credits on and Off-Broadway. She is best known for her portrayal of Chava, Tevye's third daughter and the one who marries a Gentile, in the 1971 film Fiddler on the Roof.

== Early life and education ==
Neva Small grew up on Central Park West. Her mother graduated in the first class of harpists at Juilliard in 1938, and played in an all-female orchestra at the Waldorf Astoria.

Small began singing in an extracurricular after-school program, and acted in Hebrew school and in the Jewish Theater for Children, where she was an understudy for Don Scardino. At age 10, she played Beverly Sills's daughter in The Ballad of Baby Doe (1963) at the New York City Opera.

She studied at the LaGuardia High School of Music & Art and Performing Arts. She was accepted at the Juilliard drama school, but deferred her admission for a year in order to act in the 1971 film Fiddler on the Roof. She then studied at New York University's Gallatin School.

== Theatrical career ==
Small made her Broadway debut in the 1964 musical Something More! Other early Broadway stage credits include The Impossible Years (1965–1967), Henry, Sweet Henry (1967), Frank Merriwell (1971), and Something's Afoot (1976).

Her early Off-Broadway performances include Ballad for a Firing Squad (1968) and Show Me Where the Good Times Are (1970). She turned down a part in Godspell to play the title character in F. Jasmine Addams, the first musical staged at Circle in the Square Theatre, in 1971. Based on the novel The Member of the Wedding by Carson McCullers, the one-act play was cancelled after six performances.

She also appeared in Leonard Bernstein's Mass (1971), Yentl the Yeshiva Boy (1974), Styne After Styne (1980), and a revised edition of Blues in the Night that toured the East Coast in the mid-1980s. In 1985–1986 she played in 277 performances of The Golden Land, a Jewish cultural revue, at the Second Avenue Theatre. In 1990, she appeared in Hannah...1939 at the Vineyard Theatre.

== Fiddler on the Roof ==
Small made her film debut as Chava, the third of Tevye's five daughters, in the 1971 film adaptation of the long-running Broadway musical Fiddler on the Roof. Her character leaves the Jewish community to marry a gentile. While Small had wanted to audition for the original Broadway show, she was told by the play's producers that she "wasn't Jewish enough". She screen-tested for the characters of both Hodel and Chava, and won the latter role. Since she was under 18, she required a guardian during the filming; her older sister Gail assumed this role.

== Later work ==
Small has continued to act and sing in musical productions. In 2007 she starred in the one-woman show Neva Small: Not Quite an Ingenue, a theatrical revue based on her musical career, at The Actors' Temple.

Her television credits include Law & Order, Law & Order: Criminal Intent, and The Hijacking of the Achille Lauro.

Small provides "edu-entertainment" for children at Jewish community centers, discussing the background of Sholem Aleichem's stories, Marc Chagall's paintings, and the Russian Jewish experience that inspired the Fiddler on the Roof story and film. She has also performed as a puppeteer.

== Musical recordings ==
In 1966, at a young age, Small recorded four singles for the MGM Records label.

In 2004, Small recorded her first solo album, My Place in the World (Small Penny Enterprises Records). This compilation of melodies that she sang during her stage and film career is noted for including "many generally obscure show tunes." It was followed in 2007 by a second album, "Not Quite an Ingenue."

== Personal life ==
She and her late husband Dr. Frederic Fenig, a dermatologist, have two daughters. They resided in New York City.

== Sources ==
- Dietz, Dan (2016). The Complete Book of 1990s Broadway Musicals. Rowman & Littlefield. ISBN 978-1442272149.
- Dietz, Dan (2012). Off Broadway Musicals, 1910–2007: Casts, Credits, Songs, Critical Reception and Performance Data of More Than 1,800 Shows. McFarland. ISBN 978-0786457311.
- Flinn, Denny Martin (2006). Little Musicals for Little Theatres: A Reference Guide to the Musicals that Don't Need Chandeliers Or Helicopters to Succeed. Hal Leonard Corporation. ISBN 0879103213.
- Hischak, Thomas S. (2001). American Theatre: A Chronicle of Comedy and Drama, 1969-2000. Vol. 4. Oxford University Press. ISBN 0195123476.
- McBride, Jerry L. (2011). Douglas Moore: A Bio-bibliography. A-R Editions, Inc. ISBN 978-0895796660.
- Mordden, Ethan (2015). One More Kiss: The Broadway Musical in the 1970s. St. Martin's Press. ISBN 978-1250103048.
- Ruppli, Michel (1998). The MGM Labels: 1961-1982. Greenwood Publishing Group. ISBN 0313307792.
- Samberg, Joel (2000). Reel Jewish. Jonathan David Publishers. ISBN 0824604245. "chava."
- Sudhalter, Richard M. (2003). Stardust Melody: The Life and Music of Hoagy Carmichael. Oxford University Press. ISBN 0195168984. *Suskind, Steven (2010). Show Tunes: The Songs, Shows, and Careers of Broadway's Major Composers (4th ed.). Oxford University Press. ISBN 978-0199742097.
- Willis, John (1991). John Willis' Theatre World. Vol. 46. Crown Publishers. ISBN 9780517584330.
