= Kiss Toledo Goodbye =

- Directed by: Lyndon Chubbuck
- Written by: Robert Easter
- Starring: Michael Rapaport; Christopher Walken; Christine Taylor; Robert Forster; Nancy Allen
- Cinematography: Frank Byers
- Edited by: Rebecca Ross
- Music by: Phil Marhsall
- Release date: November 22, 1999
- Running time: 96 minutes
- Country: United States
- Language: English

Kiss Toledo Goodbye is a 1999 independent comedy/thriller film directed by Lyndon Chubbuck. It stars Michael Rapaport, Christopher Walken, Robert Forster, Nancy Allen and Christine Taylor. Rapaport plays a young man who suddenly learns that the biological father he knew nothing about is a crime lord. Upon witnessing his father's death, he is expected to join forces with his new "family" and is challenged to prove himself.

== Plot ==
Following the assassination of his crime boss's biological father (Robert Forster), whom he had not even known existed, a young Ohio investment advisor (Michael Rapaport) must impersonate a Mafia Godfather for a few weeks to prevent a gang war.

He tries to keep this new life secret from his real family, especially his very jealous fiancée (Christine Taylor), with the help of his new "family" and his father's chief lieutenant (Christopher Walken). At the same time, he is being pressured by his boss at work to sign off on a due diligence report for a questionable investment, trying to keep his family safe, dodging assassination attempts, and trying to uncover who killed his father.

== Cast ==
- Michael Rapaport as Kevin Gower
- Christopher Walken as Max
- Robert Forster as Sal Fortuna
- Christine Taylor as Deeann Emory
- Jamie Anderson as Wendy
- Nancy Allen as Madge
- Paul Schulze as Nicky
- Paul Ben-Victor as Vince
- Saul Stein as Anthony
- Robert Pine as Oz
- Robert Alan Beuth as Harry

== Reception ==
Nathan Rabin wrote in The A.V. Club, "A ham-fisted comedy that plays like a series of sewn-together outtakes from superior films... Chubbuck presides over Kiss Toledo Goodbye with a leaden comic touch appropriate to his experience directing Baywatch, while displaying all the visual style of a first-time director of amateur porn."
