= Home Movies (film) =

1979 film by Brian De Palma

- Theatrical poster
- Directed by: Brian De Palma
- Screenplay by: Kim Ambler; Dana Edelman; Robert Harders; Stephen Le May; Charlie Loventhal; Gloria Norris
- Story by: Brian De Palma
- Produced by: Gilbert Adler; Brian De Palma; Jack Temchin
- Starring: Nancy Allen; Mary Davenport; Kirk Douglas; Vincent Gardenia; Keith Gordon; Gerrit Graham
- Cinematography: James L. Carter
- Edited by: Corky O'Hara
- Music by: Pino Donaggio
- Distributed by: United Artists
- Release date: August 28, 1979 (UK)
- Running time: 90 minutes
- Country: United States
- Language: English
- Budget: $350,000
- Box office: $89,134 (USA)

Home Movies is a 1979 independent film directed by Brian De Palma and starring Kirk Douglas, Nancy Allen, Vincent Gardenia, Keith Gordon, Theresa Saldana and Gerrit Graham.

De Palma had been teaching film at his alma mater Sarah Lawrence College, and conceived this project as a hands-on training exercise for his students. They were given the primary responsibilities of raising money, arranging the shooting schedule, and editing the film, all under De Palma's supervision. Many of these students, such as Gilbert Adler, Sam Irvin and Charlie Loventhal, went on to long careers of their own, producing and directing films.

== Plot ==
A film instructor known as The Maestro champions a technique called "Star Power"—which teaches students how to avoid the fate of becoming "an extra in your own life," since "the camera never lies." His pupil Dennis Byrd films everything that happens at home, and is presented as a "tragic example of someone who refused to star in his own life." Dennis has a rivalry with his more favored brother James, who runs a 70s-style EST-type summer camp called "Spartanetics", a mother prone to dramatic outbursts, and a philandering father.

== Cast ==
- Kirk Douglas as The Maestro
- Vincent Gardenia as Dr. Byrd
- Mary Davenport as Mrs. Byrd
- Nancy Allen as Kristina
- Keith Gordon as Denis Byrd
- Gerrit Graham as James Byrd
- Theresa Saldana as Judy
- Loretta Tupper as Grandma
- Captain Haggerty as Policeman

== Production ==
Home Movies came about from a film workshop Brian De Palma taught at Sarah Lawrence College, the aim of which was to provide students experience with all aspects of low-budget filmmaking, and demonstrate that commercial success could come from using modest resources. Many of the events that happen to Keith Gordon's character Dennis Byrd were modeled on events from De Palma's own adolescence.

De Palma invested in the film's budget along with other investors such as Steven Spielberg, George Lucas and star Kirk Douglas. The film's crew was made up entirely of Sarah Lawrence students. De Palma initially didn't intend to direct the film, but decided to step into the role as the budget grew in order to maintain order with the initial two month shoot stretching to a year. 20th Century Fox and Orion Pictures both expressed interest in financing the Home Movies, but De Palma declined as he wanted to keep the film non-union in order to ensure his students got hands on experience.

== Release ==
United Artists acquired the theatrical rights to Home Movies in February 1980 with plans to test market the film in major cities before moving to larger markets. Home Movies was released in New York City on May 16, 1980 earning around $12,000 after a one week screening. De Palma blamed the weak opening on United Artists' meager marketing budget which lead to De Palma using $7,500 of his own money to buy newspaper ads to spread awareness while United Artists' executive Nathaniel Kwit said United Artists' was reluctant to open in New York and only did so because De Palma and the film's producers felt the director's loyal following in the city would help boost the film's profile. The failure of Home Movies led to United Artists losing faith in the film no further attempts to theatrically market the film.

== Reception ==
Fernando F. Croce of Slant Magazine awarded the film three stars out of four.
