= Dressed to Kill (1980 film) =

1980 film by Brian De Palma

- Theatrical release poster
- Directed by: Brian De Palma
- Written by: Brian De Palma
- Produced by: George Litto
- Starring: Michael Caine; Angie Dickinson; Nancy Allen
- Cinematography: Ralf D. Bode
- Edited by: Gerald B. Greenberg
- Music by: Pino Donaggio
- Production company: Cinema 77
- Distributed by: Filmways Pictures
- Release date: July 25, 1980
- Running time: 105 minutes
- Country: United States
- Language: English
- Budget: $6.5 million
- Box office: $31.9 million

Dressed to Kill is a 1980 American erotic thriller film written and directed by Brian De Palma, starring Michael Caine, Angie Dickinson, Nancy Allen and Keith Gordon. It depicts the events leading up to the brutal murder of New York City housewife Kate Miller (Dickinson) before following Liz Blake (Allen), a prostitute who witnesses the crime and her attempts to solve it with the help of the victim's son Peter (Gordon).

Like several of De Palma's films, Dressed to Kill is heavily influenced by the works of filmmaker Alfred Hitchcock. The film contains several references to Hitchcock's Psycho (1960). Filming took place in New York City and Philadelphia. Pino Donaggio composed the musical score.

Released by Filmways Pictures in July 1980, Dressed to Kill was a box office success in the United States, grossing over $31 million against a production budget of $6.5 million. The film polarized critics, but has since gained a cult following. Nancy Allen was nominated for the Golden Globe Award for New Star of the Year – Actress, and Angie Dickinson won the Saturn Award for Best Actress.

== Plot ==
Sexually frustrated housewife Kate Miller is attending therapy sessions with New York City psychiatrist Dr. Robert Elliott. During an appointment, Kate attempts to seduce him, but Elliott rejects her advances, stating his unwillingness to jeopardize his happy marriage. Kate has planned to spend the day with her teenage son Peter, an inventor, but he has to cancel as he has reached a critical point in his research for his entry to the city's science fair. Thus, Kate goes alone to a museum where she unexpectedly flirts with mysterious stranger Warren Lockman. Kate and Warren stalk each other through the museum until they finally wind up outside, where Kate joins him in a taxi, where he embraces and pleasures her. They go to his apartment and have sex.

Hours later, Kate awakens and decides to discreetly leave while Warren is asleep. Kate sits at his desk to leave him a note and finds a document from the Health Department indicating that Warren has contracted both syphilis and gonorrhea. Shocked and fear-stricken, she leaves the apartment, but having hastily forgotten her wedding ring on the nightstand, she returns to retrieve it. The elevator doors open on the figure of a tall, blonde woman in dark sunglasses wielding a straight razor, who violently slashes Kate to death in the elevator. Upon discovering the body, Liz Blake, a high-priced call girl, notices the killer in the elevator's convex mirror, and subsequently becomes both the prime suspect and the killer's next target.

Dr. Elliott receives a bizarre message on his answering machine from Bobbi, a transgender patient. Bobbi taunts the psychiatrist for ending their therapy sessions, apparently because Elliott refuses to sign the necessary papers for Bobbi to undergo sex reassignment surgery. Elliott tries to convince Dr. Levy, the patient's new doctor, that Bobbi is endangering herself and others.

Police Detective Marino doubts Liz's story, partly because of her profession, so Liz partners with a revenge-minded Peter to find the killer, using a series of his homemade listening devices and time-lapse cameras to track patients leaving Elliott's office. They catch Bobbi on camera, and soon a tall blonde in sunglasses starts stalking Liz, subsequently making several attempts on her life. Peter thwarts one of them in the New York City Subway by spraying Bobbi with homemade Mace.

The pair scheme to learn Bobbi's birth name by infiltrating Dr. Elliott's office. Liz baits Dr. Elliott by stripping to lingerie and flirting with him, distracting him long enough to briefly exit and look through his appointment book. Peter is watching through the window when a blonde pulls him away. When Liz returns, a razor-wielding blonde confronts her; the blonde outside shoots and wounds the blonde inside, knocking the wig off and revealing the razor-wielding blonde as Dr. Elliott/Bobbi. The blonde who shot Bobbi is actually female police officer Betty Luce, revealing herself to be the blonde who has been trailing Liz.

Elliott is arrested and committed to a mental institution. Dr. Levy later explains to Liz that Elliott wanted to be a woman, but his male side would not allow him to proceed with the operation. Whenever a woman sexually aroused Elliott, Bobbi, representing the unstable, female side of the doctor's personality, became threatened to the point that she finally became murderous. When Dr. Levy realized this through his last conversation with Elliott, he called the police, who went to work and eventually apprehended Elliott. Elliott escapes from the asylum after strangling a nurse, stalks Liz to Peter's house, and slashes her throat. She wakes up screaming and Peter rushes to her side, letting her realize it was merely a nightmare.

== Cast ==
- Michael Caine as Dr. Robert Elliott
- Angie Dickinson as Kate Miller
- Nancy Allen as Liz Blake
- Keith Gordon as Peter Miller
- Dennis Franz as Detective Marino
- David Margulies as Dr. Levy
- Susanna Clemm as
  - Detective Betty Luce
  - Bobbi (uncredited)
  - Elliott's patient (uncredited)
- Ken Baker as Warren Lockman
- Brandon Maggart as Cleveland Sam
- Anneka Di Lorenzo as nurse
- Bill Randolph as chase cabbie
- Samm-Art Williams as subway cop
- Mary Davenport as woman in restaurant

Uncredited

- William Finley as Bobbi's voice
- Mark Margolis as mental patient

== Production ==
=== Development and writing ===
While acknowledging similarities to Alfred Hitchcock films (particularly Psycho), Brian De Palma claimed that he got the idea of the murderer from watching an interview with Nancy Hunt, a transgender woman reporter for the Chicago Tribune, on The Phil Donahue Show. A clip from the interview appears in the film.

=== Casting ===
Sean Connery was considered for Robert Elliott, but because of his previous commitments, Michael Caine ended up accepting the role. Connery would later work with De Palma in The Untouchables (1987).

De Palma originally wanted Liv Ullmann to play Kate Miller, but she declined. He then offered the role to Angie Dickinson, who accepted the part.

Nancy Allen was drawn to Liz's character, when her husband De Palma began developing the script, but kept it to herself, thinking that he would reject her. It was only when she was filming Steven Spielberg's 1941 that she got a telephone call from De Palma telling her to take a look at Liz. She accepted the role immediately. Originally, a "straight and aggressive" character, Liz developed a sense of humor after Allen provided input.

Matt Dillon and Cameron De Palma (Brian De Palma's nephew) were also in contention for the role of Peter Miller. Keith Gordon ended up gaining the part. Paul Mazursky being busy shooting a film prevented him from playing Detective Marino, which was eventually played by Dennis Franz.

Susanna Clemm, who played the policewoman as well as the role of Bobbi, and De Palma "worked out a pair of glasses that had a nose in it that matched Caine's."

=== Filming ===
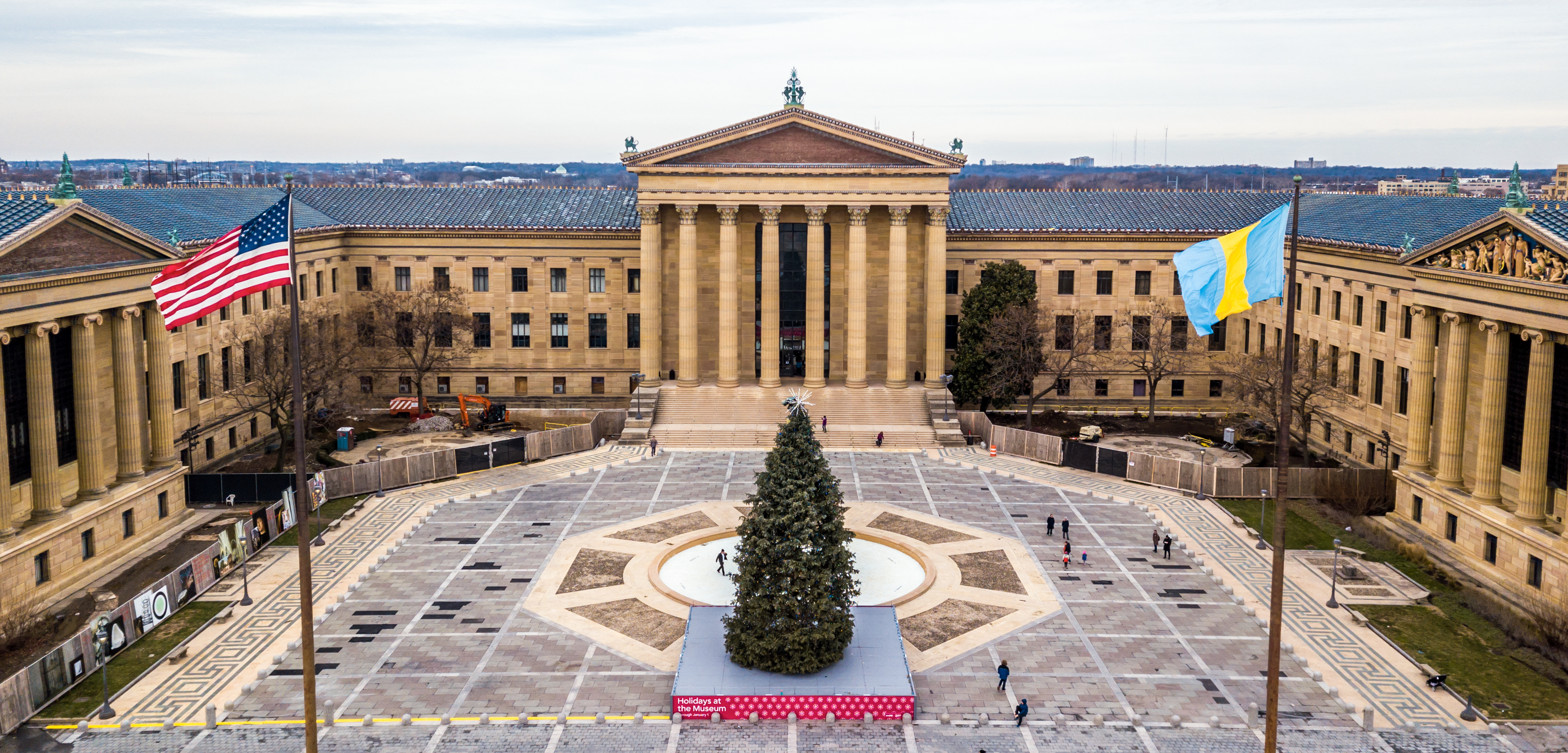
The Philadelphia Museum of Art

Dressed to Kill was shot primarily in New York City, though the art gallery scene was filmed at the Philadelphia Museum of Art. De Palma scouted the Metropolitan Museum of Art, in hopes shooting the museum scene there, but when the museum officials objected to the script, he chose to film it in Philadelphia. The film was shot between October 1979 and January 1980.

The naked body in the opening scene, taking place in a shower, was not that of Dickinson, but of 1977 Penthouse Pet of the Year model Victoria Lynn Johnson.There was a conflict between Dickinson and Ann Roth, the film's costume designer. Roth wanted Dickinson to wear a gray suit in reference to Kim Novak in Vertigo, but Dickinson wanted to wear white, saying that "they're not going to expect blood to go on a white coat." Dickinson eventually won the argument. De Palma has referred to the elevator killing as the best murder scene he has ever done.

Allen got the idea of Liz playing the stock market after she ran across Xaviera Hollander's book The Happy Hooker. During her research, a psychiatrist told her about one of his call girl patients "who came into his office wearing a fur coat with nothing on underneath." That's where Allen got the idea to wear a black garter belt under her coat in the seduction scene.

Originally, during Peter Miller's introductory scene, he was supposed to run around the room, but Gordon managed to convince De Palma that since Peter was up all night, he would not have "that kind of energy." Clemm portrayed Bobbi up until the reveal, at which point Caine portrayed the character in costume.

=== Scoring ===
De Palma settled on Pino Donaggio to score the film, wanting a sensual and erotic score, and emotional, sensuous, feminine, abrasive and disturbing sounds.

=== Censorship ===
Two versions of the film exist in North America, an R-rated version and an unrated version. The unrated version is around 30 seconds longer and shows more pubic hair in the shower scene, more blood in the elevator scene (including a close-up shot of the killer slitting Kate's throat), and more explicit dialogue from Liz Blake during the scene in Elliott's office. These scenes were trimmed when the MPAA originally gave the film an X rating.

== Themes ==
Scott Tobias noticed that "there are doubles everywhere in the film: two women, two gloves, two shower scenes, two blondes following Liz around, split-screens and split diopter shots. And there's no duality that matters more than Dr Elliott and Bobbi, one a clinical therapist who bottles his impulses, the other who springs into action whenever the doctor feels aroused." Pauline Kael pointed out the screen-within-the-screen scene "when the image is divided between Dr. Elliott at his place and Liz at hers; for her, Phil Donahue on the TV is just a background noise, while the doctor, watching the same show, is giving it close attention." J. Hoberman further pointed out how the film is "framed by two reveries imagined in the same bed — one a lascivious daydream, the other a scary nightmare."

== Release ==
=== Box office ===
Dressed to Kill premiered in Los Angeles and New York City on July 25, 1980. The film grossed $3,416,000 in its opening weekend from 591 theatres and improved its gross the following weekend with $3,640,000 from 596 theatres. It grossed a total of $31.9 million at the U.S. box office against a production budget of $6.5 million, and was the 21st highest-grossing film of the year. The film earned theatrical rentals of $15 million in the United States and Canada.

=== Home media ===
As of 2023, the film is owned by Amazon MGM Studios via Metro-Goldwyn-Mayer label (successor to Orion Pictures, who bought Filmways and American International Pictures in 1982). The film saw a 1984 VHS release by Warner Home Video, and later another VHS release by Goodtimes under licence from Orion. In 2001, MGM released the film in a special edition DVD. In September 2011, MGM released both R-rated and unrated versions on DVD and Blu-ray.

The Criterion Collection released separate deluxe Blu-ray and DVD editions of the film on September 8, 2015. On October 25, 2022, Kino Lorber issued the film for the first time in 4K UHD Blu-ray format.

== Reception ==
=== Critical response ===
Dressed to Kill divided critics; some called it a masterpiece, while others dismissed it altogether. David Denby of New York magazine proclaimed the film "the first great American movie of the '80s". Gene Siskel gave it three stars out of four, writing that there were scenes "that are as exciting and as stylish as any ever put on film. Unfortunately, a good chunk of the film is a whodunit, and its mystery is so easy to solve that we merely end up watching the film's visual pyrotechnics at a distance, never getting all that involved." Vincent Canby called the film "witty, romantic," and "very funny, which helps to defuse the effect of the graphically photographed violence. In addition, the film is, in its own inside-out way, peculiarly moral." He placed the movie in his end-of-year Ten Best Films of 1980 list. His review also added that "The performers are excellent, especially Miss Dickinson."

Sheila Benson wrote, "the brilliance of Dressed to Kill is apparent within seconds of its opening gliding shot; it is a sustained work of terror—elegant, sensual, erotic, bloody, a directorial tour de force." In his movie guide, Leonard Maltin gave the film 3 1/2 stars out of four, calling it a "High-tension melodrama", and stating "De Palma works on viewers' emotions, not logic, and maintains a fever pitch from start to finish." He also praised Donaggio's "chilling music score." John Simon, of the National Review, after taking note of the two-page advertisements full of superlatives in The New York Times, wrote "What Dressed to Kill dispenses liberally, however, is sophomoric soft-core pornography, vulgar manipulation of the emotions for mere sensation, salacious but inept dialogue that is a cross between comic-strip Freudianism and sniggering double entendres, and a plot line so full of holes to be at best a dotted line".

Variety lamented its "structural weaknesses". Roger Ebert, too, found its narrative underwhelming, and the plot somewhat implausible. Gary Arnold called the screenplay "remarkably streamlined, in an admittedly contrived, perfunctory way." However, Pauline Kael had praise for its sly dialogue. Ebert also had criticism for its ending, particularly its "it was only a dream!" gimmick.

The performances were praised by Kael, particularly Caine's typically "unself-centered" acting. Though, Variety was more reserved regarding his performance, finding him excellent "until the film's internal logic breaks down." However, they had high praise for Dickinson, referring to her participation in the film as her being "used exceptionally well." Allen was termed "wonderfully offbeat" by Ebert.

The film was noted to be influenced by the works of Alfred Hitchcock (particularly Psycho). Critics variously identified it as a thriller, a slasher, a psychological horror or a suspense comedy. (Note: Attributed to multiple references) It was criticized as pornographic and sexist.

Dressed to Kill holds an 83% "fresh" rating on Rotten Tomatoes based on 60 reviews, with an average rating of 6.80/10. The consensus states, "With arresting visuals and an engrossingly lurid mystery, Dressed to Kill stylishly encapsulates writer-director Brian De Palma's signature strengths." On Metacritic, the film has a score of 74 out of 100 based on 16 reviews, indicating "generally favorable" reviews. The film has gained a cult following since its original release.

=== Controversy ===
The film led to controversy and protests upon its release. When the film was screened, Iowa City National Organization for Women and members of other feminist organizations picketed the film as it was shown on the University of Iowa campus, distributing leaflets against the film, condemning what they saw as a depiction of violence against women as entertainment. During the film's initial release, the activist group Women Against Violence in Pornography and Media distributed a leaflet, arguing that "The distorted image of a psychotic male transvestite makes all sexual minorities appear sick and dangerous." Numerous critics have since placed Dressed to Kill in a lineage of slasher movies that perpetuate the transphobic myth that trans people are mentally ill sexual predators. (Note: Attributed to multiple references) Dressed to Kill was featured in the 2020 documentary Disclosure: Trans Lives on Screen; in a 2020 reappraisal of the film for The Guardian, the critic Scott Tobias referred to De Palma's understanding of trans issues as "disconcertingly retrograde....There's no getting around the ugly association of gender transition with violence, other than to say that it feels thoroughly aestheticized".

In a 2016 interview, De Palma said, "I don't know what the transgender community would think [of the film now]... Obviously I realize that it's not good for their image to be transgender and also be a psychopathic murderer. But I think that [perception] passes with time. We're in a different time." He added that he was "glad" that the film had become "a favorite of the gay community," which he attributed to its "flamboyance".

=== Accolades ===
Award	Category	Nominee	Result	Ref.
Golden Globe	New Star of the Year – Actress	Nancy Allen	Nominated	
Stinkers Bad Movie Award	Worst Actress	Nancy Allen	Nominated	
Golden Raspberry Award	Worst Director	Brian De Palma	Nominated	
Golden Raspberry Award	Worst Actress	Nancy Allen	Nominated	
Golden Raspberry Award	Worst Actor	Michael Caine	Nominated	
Saturn Award	Best Horror Film		Nominated	
Saturn Award	Best Director	Brian De Palma	Nominated	
Saturn Award	Best Actress	Angie Dickinson	Won	
Saturn Award	Best Music	Pino Donaggio	Nominated	
New York Film Critics Circle Award	Best Film		5th place	
New York Film Critics Circle Award	Best Director	Brian De Palma	4th place	

== See also ==
- List of horror films of 1980
- List of American films of 1980
- List of cult films
- Transgender in film and television
- Cruising, William Friedkin's cult 1980 film with similar LGBT themes
- Giallo
