= List of Margot Kidder performances =

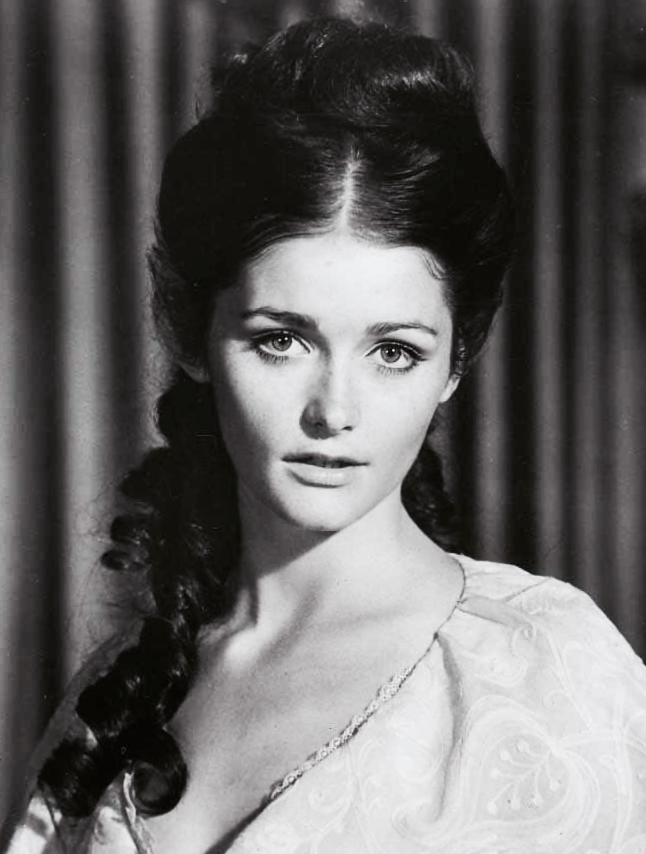
Kidder in Gaily, Gaily (1969)

The filmography of actress Margot Kidder includes over 100 credits in film and television, and spans a total of 50 years. Kidder began her career in her native Canada appearing in small independent films and on Canadian television series, before being cast opposite Beau Bridges in the period comedy Gaily, Gaily (1969). She subsequently starred opposite Gene Wilder in Quackser Fortune Has a Cousin in the Bronx (1970), and in 1972 she had a role in the movie The Bounty Man with Clint Walker, followed by a dual lead role in Brian De Palma's cult thriller film Sisters (1972), and a supporting part in the slasher film Black Christmas (1974). The following year, she co-starred with Robert Redford in the drama The Great Waldo Pepper.

Kidder came to mainstream recognition for her iconic role as Lois Lane in Richard Donner's Superman (1978); she would go on to reprise the role in the film's following three sequels. She garnered additional mainstream recognition for her role as Kathy Lutz in the blockbuster horror film The Amityville Horror (1979).

After a highly publicized nervous breakdown in 1996, Kidder appeared mainly in independent films throughout the 1990s and early-2000s. In 2004, she guest-starred as Bridgette Crosby on the network series Smallville, and also had guest role on the Showtime series The L Word (2006), and the ABC series Brothers & Sisters (2007). In 2014, Kidder won a Daytime Emmy Award for her appearance in R.L. Stine's The Haunting Hour. Kidder died in 2018, with her final film credit while she was still alive being the independent Canadian film The Neighborhood (2017). She appeared posthumously in the film Puppy Swap Love Unleashed and will appear posthumously in Robber's Roost, the latter which is her final film role.

== Film ==
Year	Title	Role	Notes	Ref.
1968	The Best Damn Fiddler from Calabogie to Kaladar	Rosie Prometer		
1969	Gaily, Gaily	Adeline	Alternate title: Chicago, Chicago	
1970	Quackser Fortune Has a Cousin in the Bronx	Zazel Pierce		
1973	Sisters	Danielle Breton / Dominique Blanchion	Alternate title: Blood Sisters	
1974	A Quiet Day in Belfast	Brigit Slattery / Thelma Slattery	Canadian Film Award for Best Actress	
1974	The Gravy Train	Margue	Alternate title: The Dion Brothers	
1974	Black Christmas	Barbara "Barb" Coard	Canadian Film Award for Best Actress	
1975	The Great Waldo Pepper	Maude Stiles		
1975	The Reincarnation of Peter Proud	Marcia Curtis		
1975	92 in the Shade	Miranda		
1978	Shoot the Sun Down	The Woman From England		
1978	Superman	Lois Lane	Saturn Award for Best Actress	
1979	The Amityville Horror	Kathy Lutz	Nominated – Saturn Award for Best Actress	
1979	Mr. Mike's Mondo Video	Herself		
1980	Willie & Phil	Jeannette Sutherland		
1980	Superman II	Lois Lane	Nominated – Saturn Award for Best Actress	
1981	Heartaches	Rita Harris	Genie Award for Best Actress	
1982	Some Kind of Hero	Toni Donovan		
1982	Miss Right	Juliette		
1983	Trenchcoat	Mickey Raymond		
1983	Superman III	Lois Lane		
1985	Little Treasure	Margo		
1986	GoBots: Battle of the Rock Lords	Solitaire	Voice	
1986	Keeping Track	Mickey Tremaine		
1987	Superman IV: The Quest for Peace	Lois Lane		
1989	Mob Story	Dolores		
1990	White Room	Madelaine X		
1991	Delirious	Woman In Washroom	Uncredited cameo	
1992	Aaron Sent Me	Kaitlynn Prescott		
1993	La Florida	Vivy Lamori		
1994	Maverick	Margret Mary	Uncredited	
1994	WindRunner	Sally "Mom" Cima	Television film	
1994	The Pornographer	Irene		
1994	Beanstalk	Dr. Kate Winston		
1994	Henry & Verlin	Mabel		
1995	Young Ivanhoe	Lady Margarite	Television film	
1996	Never Met Picasso	Genna Magnus		
1997	The Planet of Junior Brown	Miss Peebs	Alternate title: Junior's Groove	
1997	Shadow Zone: My Teacher Ate My Homework	Sol		
1997	Silent Cradle	Cindy Wilson	Television film	
1999	Crime in Connecticut: The Story of Alex Kelly	Melanie Kelly	Canadian film	
1999	The Hi-Line	Laura Johnson		
1999	The Clown at Midnight	Ellen Gibby		
1999	The Annihilation of Fish	Mrs. Muldroone		
1999	Nightmare Man	Lillian Hannibal		
2000	Tribulation	Eileen Canboro	Alternate title: Apocalypse III: Tribulation	
2002	Angel Blade	Frida		
2002	Crime and Punishment	Katerina Marmelodov		
2004	Chicks with Sticks	Edith Taymore		
2004	Death 4 Told	Madam Badeau	Scream Awards for Best Actress, (segment "The Psychic")	
2005	The Last Sign	Endora		
2006	Superman II: The Richard Donner Cut	Lois Lane	Archive footage; Re-edited director's cut of Superman II	
2008	Universal Signs	Rose Callahan		
2008	Love at First Kill	Beth		
2008	On the Other Hand, Death	Dorothy Fisher	Television film	
2008	A Single Woman	The Storyteller		
2009	Something Evil Comes	Claudia Brecher	Also known as: Death Among Friends	
2009	Halloween II	Barbara Collier		
2011	Redemption: For Robbing the Dead	Marlys Baptiste		
2011	Three of a Kind	Claire		
2012	HENRi	Dr. Calvin	Short	
2013	Matt's Chance	Mother Mable		
2013	Real Gangsters	Stella Kelly		
2014	The Dependables	Jean Dempsey	Alternate title: Pride of Lions	
2014	The Big Fat Stone	Madge		
2015	No Deposit	Margie Ryan		
2016	The Red Maple Leaf	Amanda Walker		
2017	The Neighborhood	Maggie		
2019	Puppy Swap Love Unleashed	Delilah Higgins	Posthumous release	
TBA	Robber's Roost	The Woman	Posthumous release; final film role	

== Television ==
Year	Title	Role	Notes	Ref.
1969	Wojeck		Episode: "After All, Who's Art Morrison Anyway?"	
1969	Adventures in Rainbow Country	Dr. Janet Rhodes / Sportscar Driver	2 episodes	
1969	McQueen	Jenny	3 episodes	
1969	Corwin	Denny	Episodes "Does Anybody Here Know Denny?, Pts. 1 & 2"	
1970	The Mod Squad	Claire Allen	Episode: "Call Back Yesterday"	
1971	Suddenly Single	Jackie	Television film	
1971–1972	Nichols	Ruth	5 episodes	
1972	The Bounty Man	Mae	Television film	
1972	Banacek	Linda Carsini	Episode: "A Million the Hard Way"	
1972	Harry O	Helen	Episode: "Such Dust as Dreams Are Made On"	
1973	Barnaby Jones	Lori Wright	Episode: "Trial Run for Death"	
1974	The Suicide Club		Television film	
1974	Honky Tonk	Lucy Cotton	Television film	
1975	Baretta	Terry Lake	Episode: "The Secret of Terry Lake"	
1975	Wide World Mystery	Gerry	Episode: "Suicide Club"	
1976	Switch	Andrea Morris	Episode: "The Twelfth Commandment"	
1979	Saturday Night Live	Herself (guest host)	Episode: "Margot Kidder/The Chieftains"	
1982	Bus Stop	Cherie	Television film	
1983	Pygmalion	Eliza Doolittle	Television film	
1984	Louisiana	Virginia Tregan	Television film	
1984	The Glitter Dome	Willie	Television film	
1985	The Hitchhiker	Jane Reynolds	Episode: "Nightshift"	
1985	Picking Up the Pieces	Lynette Harding	Television film	
1986	The Wonderful Wizard of Oz	The Narrator	Full season	
1986	Vanishing Act	Chris Kenyon	Television film	
1987	Shell Game	Dinah / Jennie Jerome	5 episodes	
1987	The Grand Knockout Tournament	Herself	Television special	
1988	Body of Evidence	Carol Dwyer	Television film	
1992	To Catch a Killer	Rachel Grayson	Television film	
1992	Tales from the Crypt	Cynthia	Episode: "Curiosity Killed"	
1992–1993	Street Legal	Charlotte Percy	2 episodes	
1993	Murder, She Wrote	Dr. Ellen Holden	Episode: "Threshold of Fear"	
1993–1995	Captain Planet and the Planeteers	Gaia (voice)	5 episodes	
1994	One Woman's Courage	Stella Jenson	Television film	
1995	Burke's Law	Joy Adams	Episode: "Who Killed the Highest Bidder?"	
1995	Bloodknot	Evelyn	Television film	
1996–1997	Boston Common	"Cookie" de Varen	5 episodes	
1994–1996	Phantom 2040	Rebecca Madison	34 episodes	
1997	The Hunger	Mrs. Sloan	Episode: "The Sloan Men"	
1997	Aaahh!!! Real Monsters	Mistress Helga (voice)	2 episodes	
1997	The Teddy Bears' Scare	Mrs. Jones (voice)	Television film	
1998	Touched by an Angel	Rita	Episode: "Miles to Go Before I Sleep"	
1999	Lifetime Intimate Portrait	Herself		
1999	Psi Factor: Chronicles of the Paranormal	Miss Holton / Marla Cooke	Episode: "School of Thought"	
1999	La Femme Nikita	Roberta Wirth	Episode: "Walk on By"; Nominated – OFTA Television Award for Best Guest Actress in a Cable Series	
2000	Amazon	Morag	3 episodes	
2000	Someone Is Watching	Sally Beckert	Television film	
2000	The Outer Limits	Serena	Episode: "Revival"	
2001	A&E Biography	Herself		
2001	Law & Order: Special Victims Unit	Grace Mayberry	Episode: "Pique"	
2001	Mentors	Queen Elizabeth I	Episode: "Her Grace Under Pressure"	
2001	Earth: Final Conflict	Dr. Josephine Mataros	Episode: "Termination"	
2002	Society's Child	Joan	Television film	
2004	Smallville	Bridgette Crosby	2 episodes	
2004	Mary Higgins Clark's: I'll Be Seeing You	Frances Grolier	Television film	
2005	Robson Arms	Elaine Wainwright	1 season	
2005	The Last Sign	Endora	Television film	
2006	The L Word	Sandy Ziskin	Episode: "Labia Majora"	
2007	Brothers & Sisters	Emily Craft	2 episodes	
2014	R.L. Stine's The Haunting Hour	Mrs. Worthington	Episode: "Mrs. Worthington"; Daytime Emmy Award for Outstanding Performer in Children's Programming	

== Stage ==
Year	Title	Role	Notes	Ref.
1982	Bus Stop	Cherie	Staged at Garrison Theatre, Claremont, California	
2001	The Vagina Monologues		Off-Broadway and touring production	
