= Troy (film) =

2004 film by Wolfgang Petersen

- Theatrical release poster
- Directed by: Wolfgang Petersen
- Screenplay by: David Benioff
- Based on: Iliad and Odyssey by: Homer; Aeneid; by Virgil; Metamorphoses; by Ovid
- Produced by: Wolfgang Petersen; Diana Rathbun; Colin Wilson
- Starring: Brad Pitt; Eric Bana; Orlando Bloom; Diane Kruger; Brian Cox; Sean Bean; Brendan Gleeson; Rose Byrne; Peter O'Toole
- Cinematography: Roger Pratt
- Edited by: Peter Honess
- Music by: James Horner
- Production companies: Warner Bros. Pictures; Radiant Productions; Plan B Entertainment; Helena Productions; Latina Pictures; Nimar Studios
- Distributed by: Warner Bros. Pictures
- Release dates: May 13, 2004 (Cannes); May 14, 2004 (United States)
- Running time: 163 minutes (theatrical); 196 minutes (director's cut)
- Countries: United States; United Kingdom; Mexico; Malta
- Language: English
- Budget: $150–175 million
- Box office: $497.4 million

Troy is a 2004 epic historical action film directed by Wolfgang Petersen and written by David Benioff. Produced by units in Malta, Mexico, and Britain's Shepperton Studios, the film features an ensemble cast led by Brad Pitt, Eric Bana, Orlando Bloom, Diane Kruger, Sean Bean, Brian Cox, Brendan Gleeson, Rose Byrne, and Peter O'Toole. It is loosely based on Homer's Iliad in its narration of the entire story of the decade-long Trojan War—condensed into little more than a couple of weeks, rather than just the quarrel between Achilles and Agamemnon in the ninth year. Achilles leads his Myrmidons along with the rest of the Greek army invading the historic city of Troy, defended by Hector's Trojan army. The end of the film (the sack of Troy) is not taken from the Iliad, but rather from Homer's Odyssey, Virgil's Aeneid and Ovid's Metamorphoses, as the Iliad concludes with Hector's death and funeral.

Troy premiered at Cannes on May 13, 2004 before being released by Warner Bros. Pictures on May 14. The film made over $497 million worldwide, making it the 60th highest-grossing film at the time of its release and Petersen's highest-grossing film. However, it received mixed reviews, with critics praising its entertainment value and the performances of Pitt and Bana while criticizing its story, which was deemed unfaithful to the Iliad. It received a nomination for Best Costume Design at the 77th Academy Awards and was the eighth highest-grossing film of 2004. A director's cut version, with thirty extra minutes of newly added footage, was released on DVD on September 18, 2007.

== Plot ==
In 1184 BC, King Agamemnon unites the Greek kingdoms. Achilles, a mighty warrior, fights for Agamemnon but is sickened by his brutal leadership. Meanwhile, Prince Hector of Troy and his brother Paris forge a peace treaty with Menelaus, King of Sparta. Paris begins an affair with Menelaus's wife, Queen Helen, and he smuggles her aboard his homebound vessel. Angered, Menelaus meets Agamemnon, his elder brother, and asks him to help take Troy. Agamemnon agrees, as conquering Troy would give him control of the Aegean Sea. Agamemnon sends Odysseus, King of Ithaca, to persuade Achilles to join them. Conflicted, Achilles seeks guidance from his mother, Thetis, who tells him that if he remains in Larissa, he will live a peaceful life, while going to Troy will bring him both death and eternal glory. Inspired by the promise of lasting fame, Achilles chooses to join the war.

In Troy, King Priam welcomes Helen when Hector and Paris return home, and decides to prepare for war. The Greeks eventually invade and take the Trojan beach, thanks largely to Achilles and his Myrmidons. Achilles has the temple of Apollo sacked, and claims Briseis — a priestess and the cousin of Paris and Hector — as a prisoner. He is angered when Agamemnon spitefully takes her from him, and decides that he will not aid Agamemnon in the siege.

The Trojan and Greek armies meet outside of Troy. During a parley, Paris offers to personally duel Menelaus in exchange for Helen and the city being spared. Agamemnon, intending to take the city regardless, accepts. Menelaus wounds Paris and almost kills him, but is himself killed by Hector, which violates the pact. In the ensuing battle, Hector kills Ajax the Great and many Greeks die due to Hector's skillful leadership of the Trojan army which forces Agamemnon's army to retreat. Agamemnon gives Briseis to the Greek soldiers for their amusement, but Achilles saves her and they begin to bond. Later that night, Briseis sneaks into Achilles's quarters to kill him; instead, she falls for him and they become lovers. Achilles then resolves to leave Troy, much to the dismay of Patroclus, his cousin and protégé.

Despite Hector's objections, Priam orders a counterattack. In battle, Hector duels a warrior he believes to be Achilles and cuts his throat, but then sees it is Patroclus. Distraught, Hector finishes him off in a coup de grâce, and both armies agree to stop fighting for the day. Achilles is informed of his cousin's death and vows revenge. Wary of Achilles, Hector shows his wife Andromache a secret tunnel. Should he die and Troy fall, he instructs her to take their child and any survivors out of the city to Mount Ida.

The next day, Achilles arrives outside Troy and challenges Hector. The two duel until Hector is killed, and Achilles drags his corpse back to the beach. Priam sneaks into the camp and implores Achilles to return Hector's body for a proper funeral. Ashamed of his actions, Achilles agrees and allows Briseis to return to Troy with Priam, promising a twelve-day truce so that Hector's funeral rites may be held in peace. He also orders Eudorus and the surviving Myrmidons to return home without him.

Agamemnon declares that he will take Troy regardless of the cost. Concerned, Odysseus concocts a plan to infiltrate the city: he has the Greeks build a gigantic wooden horse as a peace offering and abandon the beach, hiding their ships in a nearby cove. Priam orders the horse be brought into the city. That night, Greeks hiding inside the horse emerge and open the city gates for the Greek army, commencing the sack of Troy.

The soldiers of Troy attempt to defend the city but they are overwhelmed and massacred while most of the population is killed or taken as slaves. As the lower city is being sacked, Andromache and Helen guide the Trojans to safety through the tunnel. Paris gives the Sword of Troy to Aeneas, instructing him to protect the survivors and find them a new home. As the Greek army penetrates the palace walls, Glaucus leads the remaining Trojan soldiers in a valiant defense of the palace. Trojans kill many Greeks, but are ultimately overwhelmed and killed. Agamemnon enters the throne room, kills Priam and captures Briseis. She kills Agamemnon with a concealed knife, then Achilles fights his way through the city and reunites with Briseis. Paris, seeking to avenge his brother, shoots an arrow through Achilles' heel and then several more into his body. Achilles bids farewell to Briseis, and watches her flee with Paris before dying.

In the aftermath, Troy is finally taken by the Greeks and a funeral is held for Achilles, where Odysseus personally cremates his body.

== Cast ==
- Brad Pitt as Achilles, Greece's greatest warrior and leader of the Myrmidons; lover of Briseis.
- Eric Bana as Hector, Crown Prince of Troy, commander of the Trojan army and Paris's older brother.
- Orlando Bloom as Paris, Prince of Troy, Helen's lover and Hector's younger brother.
- Diane Kruger as Helen, the wife of Menelaus, former Queen of Sparta who became a Princess of Troy, Paris's lover.
- Brian Cox as Agamemnon, King of the Greeks.
- Sean Bean as Odysseus, King of Ithaca.
- Brendan Gleeson as Menelaus, King of Sparta, the husband of Helen and younger brother of Agamemnon.
- Rose Byrne as Briseis, Princess of Troy, Priestess of the Trojan Temple of Apollo and Hector and Paris' cousin.
- Peter O'Toole as Priam, King of Troy and Hector and Paris's father.
- Garrett Hedlund as Patroclus, Achilles's cousin.
- Saffron Burrows as Andromache, Hector's wife and Crown Princess of Troy.
- Julie Christie as Thetis, Achilles's mother.
- John Shrapnel as Nestor, Agamemnon's advisor.
- Nigel Terry as Archeptolemus, the Trojan high priest.
- James Cosmo as Glaucus, second-in-command of the Trojan armies.
- Julian Glover as Triopas, King of Thessaly.
- Vincent Regan as Eudorus, Achilles's second-in-command of the Myrmidons.
- Trevor Eve as Velior.
- Tyler Mane as Ajax.
- Nathan Jones as Boagrius, Triopas' champion.

== Production ==
Other than the Iliad, screenwriter David Benioff based the film on Homer's Odyssey, Virgil's Aeneid and Ovid's Metamorphoses. Additionally, he took inspiration from The Greek Myths by Robert Graves and Bulfinch's Mythology, as well as critical literature such as the works of Bernard Knox and his introduction to Robert Fagles's translation of the Iliad.

The city of Troy was built on the Mediterranean island of Malta at Fort Ricasoli from April to June 2003. Filming was initially slated to start in Morocco, but the producers chose Mexico after being forced to relocate after the Iraq War started. Other important scenes were shot in Mellieħa, a small town in the north of Malta, and on the small island of Comino. The outer walls of Troy were built and filmed in Cabo San Lucas, Mexico. Film production was disrupted for a period after Hurricane Marty affected filming areas. Pitt also suffered an injury to his Achilles tendon during filming which caused the production to delay for ten weeks. Both the Trojans and Greeks spoke with English accents, though the Trojan characters were portrayed with more refined and upper-class pronunciations than the Greeks. Brad Pitt, portraying Achilles, and Eric Bana, portraying Hector, both adopted British-inflected accents in their roles, reflecting a broader cinematic convention associating British speech with aristocratic or noble characters in historical dramas. Both Pitt and Bana trained for six months to get in shape for their roles.

Terry Gilliam turned down the offer to direct the film, as he "did not understand how you can make a film based on the poem the Iliad without the participation of the Greek gods". Wolfgang Petersen had developed the film for Warner Bros. Pictures, before he chose to direct a planned Batman vs. Superman film instead. Christopher Nolan was then offered to direct Troy, but when Petersen's Batman vs. Superman was canceled, Petersen rejoined Troy, and Nolan was given Batman Begins (2005) as a "consolation prize". Nolan subsequently directed the 2026 film adaptation of Homer's Odyssey.

The role of Briseis was initially offered to Indian actress Aishwarya Rai, but she turned it down because she was not comfortable doing the sex scenes that were included. Keira Knightley also auditioned, but the role eventually went to Rose Byrne. The studio was initially interested in Nicole Kidman for the role of Helen, which eventually went to Diane Kruger. Kruger later said that she felt "like meat" during a screen test for the film.

One of the extras, George Camilleri, is alleged to have died as a result of a set injury during the filming. The movie used Bulgarian extras, including in Mexico, where they were exposed to harsh conditions and were underpaid – they received $12 a day, compared to the Mexican extras, who received $40 a day. After going on a strike, their pay was raised by $10 a day.

== Music ==
Composer Gabriel Yared originally worked on the score for Troy for over a year, having been hired by the director, Wolfgang Petersen. Tanja Carovska provided vocals on various portions of the music, as she later would on composer James Horner's version of the soundtrack. However, the reactions at test screenings which used an incomplete version of the score were negative, and in less than a day Yared was off the project without a chance to fix or change his music. Horner composed a replacement score in about four weeks. He used Carovska's vocals again and also included traditional Eastern Mediterranean music and brass instruments. Horner also collaborated with American singer-songwriter Josh Groban and lyricist Cynthia Weil to write an original song for the film's end credits. The product of this collaboration, "Remember", was performed by Groban with additional vocals by Carovska.

The soundtrack for the film was released on May 11, 2004, through Reprise Records.

== Director's cut ==
The Troy: Director's Cut, also known as the 2007 Version (according to the end credits), was screened at the 57th Berlin International Film Festival on February 17, 2007, and received a limited release in Germany in April 2007. Warner Home Video reportedly spent more than $1 million for the director's cut, which includes "at least 1,000 new cuts" or almost 30 minutes of extra footage (with a new running time of 196 minutes). The DVD was released on September 18, 2007, in the US. The score of the film was changed dramatically, with many of the female vocals being cut. An addition to the music is the use of Danny Elfman's theme for Planet of the Apes during the pivotal fight between Hector and Achilles in front of the Gates of Troy. Josh Groban's song was removed from the end credits as well.

Various shots were recut and extended. For instance, the love scene between Helen and Paris was reframed to include more nudity of Diane Kruger. The love scene between Achilles and Briseis is also extended. Only one scene was removed: the scene where Helen tends to the wound of Paris is taken out. The battle scenes were also extended, depicting more violence and gore, including much more of Ajax's bloody rampage on the Trojans during the initial attack by the Greek army and his duel with Hector. Perhaps most significant was the sack of Troy, barely present in the theatrical cut, but shown more fully here, depicting the Greek soldiers raping women and massacring the soldiers of Troy. Characters were provided more time to develop, specifically Priam and Odysseus, the latter being given a humorous introduction scene. More emphasis is given to the internal conflict in Troy between the priests, who believe in omens and signs from the gods to determine the outcome of the war, and military commanders, who believe in practical battle strategies to achieve victory, mainly between Trevor Eve and James Cosmo. Lastly, bookend scenes were added: the beginning being a soldier's dog finding its dead master and the end including a sequence where the few surviving Trojans escape to Mount Ida.

There are frequent differences between the Iliad and Troy, most notably relating to the final fates of Paris, Helen, Agamemnon, Achilles and Menelaus. In one of the commentary sequences, the film's writer, David Benioff, said that when it came to deciding whether to follow the Iliad or to do what was best for the film, they always did what seemed best for the film. "I think there are maybe two or three lines in the script that quote Homer," Benioff says. "Any more than that wouldn't have been possible."

== Home media ==
Troy was released on DVD and VHS on January 4, 2005. The Director's Cut was released on Blu-ray, HD DVD, and DVD on September 18, 2007.

Arrow Video released a 4K restoration on a limited edition three-disc 4K Blu-ray and remastered Blu-ray on August 17, 2026. Each set contains, for the first time, the original theatrical version, and the Director's Cut in the first two discs, both restored in 4K from the original 35mm camera negative with the addition of Dolby Vision and the film's original lossless DTS-HD MA 5.1. while the third disc is a special features Blu-ray disc featuring most of the legacy extras from each cut's respective previously released home media releases.

== Reception ==
=== Box office ===
Troy grossed $133.4 million in the United States and Canada, and $364 million in other territories, for a worldwide total of $497.4 million, making the film one of the highest grossing films of 2004, alongside The Passion of the Christ, Spider-Man 2 and Shrek 2. When the film was completed, total production costs were approximately $150–175 million, making Troy one of the most expensive films produced at that time. It was screened out of competition at the 2004 Cannes Film Festival.

The film made $46.9 million in its opening weekend, topping the box office, then $23.9 million in its second weekend falling to second.

=== Critical response ===
On Rotten Tomatoes, Troy holds an approval rating of 53% based on 227 reviews, with an average rating of 6.00/10. The site's critics consensus reads: "A brawny, entertaining spectacle, but lacking emotional resonance." On Metacritic, the film has a weighted average score of 56 out of 100, based on 43 critics, indicating "mixed or average reviews". Audiences polled by CinemaScore gave the film an average grade of "B" on an A+ to F scale.

Roger Ebert rated the film two out of four stars, saying: "Pitt is modern, nuanced, introspective; he brings complexity to a role where it is not required." IGN critics Christopher Monfette and Cindy White praised the director's cut as superior to the early version, evaluating it with eight stars out of ten. David Sterritt of Christian Science Monitor gave it a three out of four rating and wrote, "This is hardly an Iliad adaptation for the ages. But if you're hankering for sand, sandals, and swordplay, this could be the movie for you."

Peter O'Toole, who played Priam, spoke negatively of the film during an appearance at the Savannah Film Festival, stating he walked out of the film fifteen minutes into a screening, and criticized the director, slamming him as "a clown". Years later, Brad Pitt expressed disappointment with the film, saying: "I had to do Troy because ... I pulled out of another movie and then had to do something for the studio. So I was put in Troy. It wasn't painful, but I realized that the way that movie was being told was not how I wanted it to be. I made my own mistakes in it. What am I trying to say about Troy? I could not get out of the middle of the frame. It was driving me crazy. I'd become spoiled working with David Fincher. It's no slight on Wolfgang Petersen. Das Boot is one of the all-time great films. But somewhere in it, Troy became a commercial kind of thing. Every shot was like, 'Here's the hero!' There was no mystery."

Some have criticized screenwriter David Benioff, who later became one of the creators of the fantasy TV series Game of Thrones, for taking on too much material by covering the complete and lengthy chronology of the Trojan War. Benioff said he was aware of this challenge, having been quoted addressing this point in an article by actor David Goldsmith in the journal Creative Screenwriting: "The script covers the Trojan War in its entirety, whereas Iliad is only one fragment of it. I didn't want to have little titles saying, 'Flash forward nine years.' It would have made it more faithful to the source material, but it wouldn't have been effective for the movie. I always followed the route that I thought was better for the movie; if that meant that I was cheating on Homer then so be it."

Following the release of Nolan's The Odyssey in 2026, Troy became a major hit on HBO Max and other non-US streaming platforms on Europe and Latin America. It also reached no. 7 at IMDb's "Most Popular Movies" list and became the 13th most popular film at Letterboxd's list as of July 23. In a retrospective review, Polygon Matt Patches said that "It's long, stoic, hyper-saturated, and almost as fascinated by the sculptural perfection of Brad Pitt's abs as François Duquesnoy was with Adonis. [...] The whole thing barrels toward spectacle with conviction, which makes it rewatchable at the very least."

=== Accolades ===
Award	Date of ceremony	Category	Recipient(s)	Result	Ref.
Academy Awards	February 27, 2005	Best Costume Design	Bob Ringwood	Nominated	
ASCAP Film and Television Music Awards	April 27, 2005	Top Box Office Films	James Horner	Won	
Golden Schmoes Awards	2004	Biggest Disappointment of the Year	Troy	Nominated	
Golden Schmoes Awards	2004	Best Action Sequence of the Year	Hector vs. Achilles	Nominated	
Golden Trailer Awards	2004	Best Music	Troy	Nominated	
Golden Trailer Awards	2004	Summer 2004 Blockbuster	"Greatest War"	Nominated	
Harry Awards	2005	Film Which Most Contributed to the Public Understanding and Appreciation of History	Troy	Nominated	
Irish Film & Television Awards	October 30, 2004	Best Supporting Actor – Film	Peter O'Toole	Won	
Japan Academy Film Prize	February 18, 2005	Outstanding Foreign Language Film	Troy	Nominated	
London Film Critics' Circle Film Awards	February 9, 2005	British Supporting Actor of the Year	Brian Cox	Nominated	
Motion Picture Sound Editors	February 26, 2005	Best Sound Editing - Foreign Feature	Martin Cantwell, Wylie Stateman (supervising sound editors/sound designers); James Boyle (sound designer); Harry Barnes (supervising Foley editor); Paul Conway (supervising ADR editor); Matthew Grime, Howard Halsall, Alex Joseph, Sue Lenny, Simon Price, Steve Schwalbe, Nigel Stone (sound effects editors)	Nominated	
MTV Movie Awards	June 4, 2005	Best Male Performance	Brad Pitt	Nominated	
MTV Movie Awards	June 4, 2005	Best Fight	Brad Pitt vs. Eric Bana	Nominated	
Saturn Awards	June 24, 2008	Best DVD or Blu-ray Special Edition Release	Troy: Director's Cut – Ultimate Collector's Edition	Nominated	
Stinkers Bad Movie Awards	2004	Worst Actor	Brad Pitt	Nominated	
Stinkers Bad Movie Awards	2004	Most Annoying Fake Accent (Male)	Brad Pitt	Nominated	
Taurus World Stunt Awards	September 25, 2005	Best Fight	Hector vs. Achilles — Mark Mottram and Buster Reeves	Nominated	
Taurus World Stunt Awards	September 25, 2005	Best Stunt Coordinator and/or 2nd Unit Director	Simon Crane	Nominated	
Teen Choice Awards	August 8, 2004	Choice Movie – Action	Troy	Nominated	
Teen Choice Awards	August 8, 2004	Choice Movie Actor: Drama/Action Adventure	Brad Pitt	Won	
Teen Choice Awards	August 8, 2004	Choice Movie Actor: Drama/Action Adventure	Orlando Bloom	Nominated	
Teen Choice Awards	August 8, 2004	Choice Breakout Movie Actor	Garrett Hedlund	Nominated	
Teen Choice Awards	August 8, 2004	Choice Movie Fight/Action Sequence	Brad Pitt vs. Eric Bana	Nominated	
Visual Effects Society Awards	February 16, 2005	Outstanding Supporting Visual Effects in a Feature Motion Picture	Nick Davis, Chas Jarrett, Jon Thum, and Gary Brozenich	Nominated}	
World Soundtrack Awards	October 15, 2005	Best Original Song	"Remember Me" — James Horner and Cynthia Weil	Nominated	

== See also ==
- The Odyssey, 2026 film directed by Christopher Nolan
- Sword-and-sandal
- Epic film
- Greek mythology in popular culture
- List of films based on poems
- List of historical films
