= Gabriel Walsh =

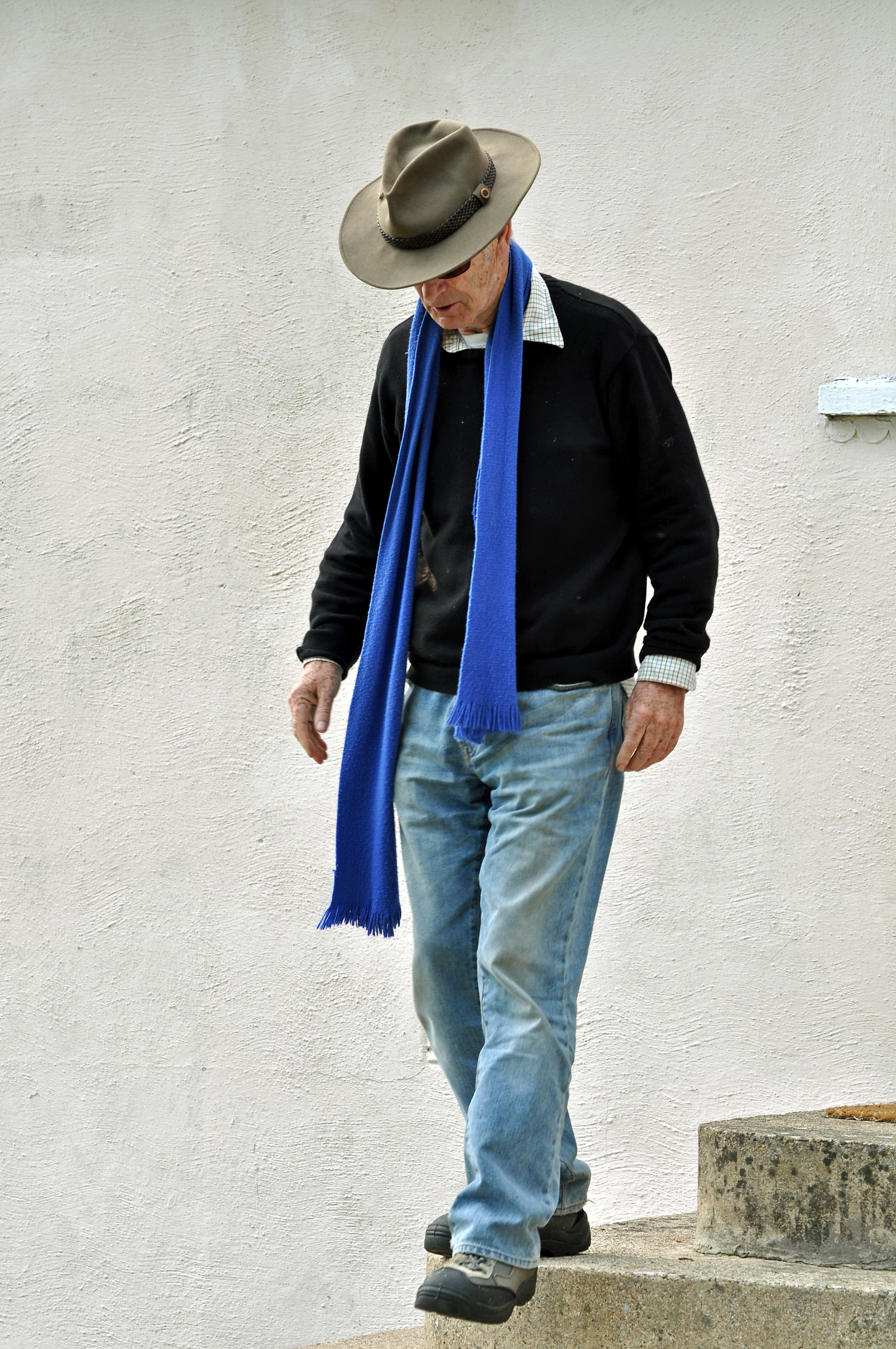
- Walsh in Fermoy, County Cork
- Born: Gabriel Walsh; Dublin, Ireland
- Occupation: Writer

Gabriel Walsh is an Irish writer.

== Early life and education ==
Walsh was born and raised in Dublin. At the age of 15, while employed as a waiter at the Shelbourne Hotel, he encountered the renowned Irish opera singer Margaret Burke-Sheridan (1889–1958). Burke-Sheridan persuaded his family to permit his relocation to the United States for educational purposes. Subsequently, Walsh enrolled at the Lee Strasberg School of Acting in both New York.

== Career ==
Since the 1970s, Walsh has continually wrote screen plays, acted, co-produced, and wrote for the Evening Echo, a newspaper in Cork.

=== Film and TV work ===
Walsh wrote the screenplay for the 1970 film Quackser Fortune Has a Cousin in the Bronx, which starred Gene Wilder and Margot Kidder.The movie received mixed reviews when it was released. However, in 1971, Walsh's screenplay was nominated for Best Comedy Written for the Screen by the Writers Guild of America.

In 2012, Quackser Fortune has a Cousin in the Bronx was listed in the Sunday Times as one of the top 100 Irish movies ever produced.

Walsh appeared in a number of movies, including Night Flowers in 1979, which he wrote and co-produced. The film received the ecumenical award at the Montreal World Film Festival in 1979. Other screen credits include Heaven's Gate in 1981, The Returning in 1983, and a featured role in the TV series Wild Wild West in 1970.

=== Plays ===
Walsh wrote several plays including The Brandy Dancers and Hearts, which was produced by Eric Morris Theatre in Los Angeles.

=== Books ===
In 2012, Walsh's memoir, entitled Maggie's Breakfast, was published by Poolbeg Publishing. Maggie's Breakfast focused on his "life-changing" encounter with Margaret Burke Sheridan. The memoir recounts his upbringing in Dublin in 1940s and 1950s as one of ten children to the moment he departs to New York, barely literate, to live and be educated by his new guardians, Wall Street economists and investors, Emerson and Ruth Houghton Axe. The book's sequel, I Dream Alone, covers Walsh's life at the Axe Castle in Tarrytown and was published in 2013.

== Works ==
- Maggie's Breakfast (Poolbeg Publishing) 25 January 2012 (ISBN 9781842235256)
- I Dream Alone (Poolbeg Publishing) 2013 (ISBN 9781842235393)
