= David Goldsmith (actor) =

American actor (born 1969)

David Goldsmith (born July 19, 1969 in New Brunswick, New Jersey) is an American actor. He featured in the Melrose Place spin-off Models Inc. where he played actress Teresa Hill's boyfriend and would-be manager. He later appeared in Hop, Rush Hour 3 and Beverly Hills Chihuahua.

He also wrote and directed Sally, a 2000 film starring Rachael Leigh Cook.
