= Sally (2000 film) =

- Directed by: David Goldsmith
- Written by: David Goldsmith
- Produced by: Ted Collins
- Starring: Michael Weston; Rachael Leigh Cook; David GoldsmithDavid Goldsmith
- Cinematography: Richard Cronn
- Edited by: Susanne Rostock
- Music by: Miki Navazio
- Release date: July 2000
- Running time: 79 minutes
- Country: United States
- Language: English

Sally is a 2000 American drama film, starring Rachael Leigh Cook, Michael Weston, and Fatmir Haskaj, and written and directed by first time director David Goldsmith, who also appears in the film as Jack.

== Cast ==
- Michael Weston as Bugs (as Michael Rubenstein)
- Rachael Leigh Cook as Beth
- David Goldsmith as Jack
- Fatmir Haskaj as Wheels (as Xander Skye)
- Gerrit Vooren as Worm
- Matt Price as Sam
- Jared Reed as Bird
- Kevin Pinassi as Chatty
- Molly Russell as Nurse Kiels
- Sam Coppola as Dr. Felch
