= The Last Sign =

2005 film by Douglas Law

- Directed by: Douglas Law
- Starring: Andie MacDowell; Samuel Le Bihan
- Release date: 14 September 2005
- Running time: 1h 31min
- Countries: Canada; United Kingdom; France
- Language: English

The Last Sign is a 2005 Canadian-British-French drama film directed by Douglas Law.

== Cast ==
- Andie MacDowell as Kathy MacFarlane
- Samuel Le Bihan as Marc
- Tim Roth as Jeremy MacFarlane
- Margot Kidder as Endora
- Mimi Kuzyk as Isabel
- Tyler Hynes as Frank
- Douglas Law as Douglas Law
