= Country Justice =

1997 American television film

- Written by: Linda Taddeo
- Directed by: Graeme Campbell
- Starring: Rachael Leigh Cook; George C. Scott; Ally Sheedy; Don Diamont
- Music by: James McVay
- Country of origin: United States
- Original language: English

Production
- Producer: Seth Ersoff
- Cinematography: Richard Leiterman
- Editor: Paul Martin Smith
- Running time: 94 minutes

Original release
- Network: CBS
- Release: January 14, 1997

Country Justice (also known as Family Rescue) is a 1997 American made-for-television crime drama film starring Rachael Leigh Cook, George C. Scott, Ally Sheedy and Don Diamont. It is based on a true story of a 1981 West Virginia Court case.

== Plot ==
Emma is a 15-year-old girl who was raised in a West Virginia mining town by her miner grandfather, Clayton Hayes. She wants to know about her mother Angie Baker, who abandoned her when she was a baby. She decides to go visit her mother in Tennessee despite her grandfather's insistence against it, leaving him a note.

When she arrives at the trailer where her mother lives, she is greeted by her mother's partner Ray Wilcox, who is instantly attracted to her. He keeps complimenting her using superficial charm until one night she goes out to dinner with him. He gives her too much champagne before taking her to an abandoned trailer and rapes her.

After the rape, Emma returns home to her grandfather, who threatens to murder Ray, but Emma talked him out of it. Emma soon finds out that she is pregnant and, after contemplation, decides to keep the baby. Some months later, Ray begins stalking her, which causes her to go into labor from shock when she catches him watching her from outside a house window. She gives birth to a son named Matthew Baker and becomes focused on being a good mother. Ray sues for sole custody of their son, easily winning the case due to his age and financial income, but Clayton kidnaps the baby to keep Ray from taking him.

After Clayton becomes a fugitive, the police arrive at Emma's house along with Ray to get the baby. Emma tells them she does not have the baby and, after persistent threats from Ray, they leave. Various friends assist Clayton while on the run, including a minister.

Clayton is forced to come out of hiding and seek a hospital when the baby's health starts to decline, causing him to stop breathing. He is eventually found, and Emma wins the custody fight on appeal and Clayton is granted custody of the baby. Angie finds out about what had happened to Emma and arrived to witness the trial, then reconciled with her family so that she can be close to Emma and help raising Matthew while leaving Ray. Ray tries to talk to Angie, but Clayton sends him away; Ray leaves them alone due to Clayton's threats of retaliations for the family's entire ordeals. At the end of the movie Angie, Clayton, and Emma wind up living together and taking care of Matthew. Emma goes back to school, able to maintain a scarred but peaceful life as a teenage mother.

== Cast ==
- Rachael Leigh Cook as Emma Baker - Daughter of Angie, granddaughter of Clayton, and mother of Matthew. Her father Gene Baker is only briefly mentioned at the beginning of the film and not much is known about him.
- George C. Scott as Clayton Hayes - father of Angie, grandfather of Emma, and great-grandfather of Matthew.
- Ally Sheedy as Angie Baker - Mother of Emma, daughter of Clayton, grandmother of Matthew, and partner of Ray. Her ex-husband Gene Baker is only briefly mentioned at the beginning of the film but not much is known about him.
- Don Diamont as Ray Wilcox - Partner of Angie and father of Matthew and the film's main villain.

== Reception ==
Tony Scott of Variety magazine wrote: "There's a strong, poignant, funny vidpic deep inside "Country Justice," but Taddeo's script doesn't dig up enough of it."
