= Tempo (film) =

2003 film by Eric Styles

- DVD cover
- Directed by: Eric Styles
- Written by: Brad Fraser; Jeremy Lipp; Jennifer Salt
- Starring: Melanie Griffith; Rachael Leigh Cook; Hugh Dancy
- Production company: Universal Pictures
- Distributed by: Universal Studios Home Video
- Release date: 10 June 2003
- Running time: 83 minutes
- Countries: Canada; France; United Kingdom; Luxembourg
- Language: English

Tempo is a 2003 romantic thriller film directed by Eric Styles and starring Melanie Griffith, Rachael Leigh Cook, and Hugh Dancy.

== Premise ==
The film is set primarily in Paris and concentrates on a love triangle that gets increasingly complicated as criminal enterprises go wrong.

== Cast ==
- Melanie Griffith as Sarah James
- Rachael Leigh Cook as Jenny Travile
- Hugh Dancy as Jack Ganzer
- Malcolm McDowell as Walter Shrenger
- Art Malik as George Maldonado
- David La Haye as Bayliss
