= Trenchcoat (film) =

1983 film by Michael Tuchner

- Directed by: Michael Tuchner
- Written by: Jeffrey Price; Peter S. Seaman
- Produced by: Jerry Leider
- Starring: Margot Kidder; Robert Hays; David Suchet; Gila von Weitershausen; Ronald Lacey
- Cinematography: Tonino Delli Colli
- Edited by: Frank J. Urioste
- Music by: Charles Fox
- Production company: Walt Disney Productions (uncredited)
- Distributed by: Buena Vista Distribution
- Release date: March 11, 1983
- Running time: 91 min
- Country: United States
- Language: English
- Budget: $8 million
- Box office: $4,304,286 (US)

Trenchcoat is a 1983 American action comedy film directed by Michael Tuchner and starring Margot Kidder and Robert Hays. It was produced by Walt Disney Productions during an era when they began releasing more adult-oriented films, including Condorman, Never Cry Wolf, and Tron.

The film is set in Malta. A professional writer is working there on her first novel, but she accidentally gets involved in the affairs of plutonium smugglers.

== Synopsis ==
When aspiring mystery writer Mickey Raymond travels to Malta to research her first novel, she finds herself falling in love with Terry, a handsome, mysterious American. She also finds herself falling into a conspiracy of events, apparently fuelled as much by her vivid author's imagination as real-life events. A local police official is seemingly one step behind these events.

Raymond sees it as her odd luck when she becomes embroiled in an international plutonium smuggling ring, and comic chaos ensues. Weary of playing victim, she turns detective to investigate not only the source of her bad luck, but also to find out who the real culprits are. At the end, Terry and Mickey stay together, sealing their relationship with a kiss in the dark.

== Cast ==
- Margot Kidder as Mickey Raymond, the writer
- Robert Hays as Terry Leonard, the spy
- David Suchet as Stagnos, the inspector
- Gila von Weitershausen as Eva Werner
- Daniel Faraldo as Nino Tenucci, Mickey's taxi driver
- Ronald Lacey as Princess Aida
- John Justin as Marquis De Pena
- Leopoldo Trieste as Esteban Ortega
- Jennifer Darling as Laurie
- Kevork Malikyan as the Arab who kidnaps Mickey
- Vic Tablian as Achmed

== Production ==
In February 1981, producer Jerry Leider planned a "$10-million comedy-thriller", using the working title, Malta Wants Me Dead, to be released by EMI. After Leider's association with EMI ended, he brought the project to Disney, encouraged by the company's recent interest in working with independent producers. He gave a copy of the screenplay to Disney production chief Tom Wilhite on the Friday before a holiday weekend, and an agreement was reached the following Tuesday. The $8-million production boasted an international cast and crew representing such countries as the U.S., Canada, England, Italy, Germany, France, and Malta. Trenchcoat marked Leider's first release through Disney, whose distributor, Buena Vista Distribution Company, planned a release for early 1983.

Filming locations included the cities of Valletta, Mdina, and Rabat, and several landmarks, including the Hagar Qim Temples, Verdala Castle, the Grand Master Palace Armoury, St. Paul's Catacombs, the Floriana market, the Gozo ferry, and the Grand Harbour. Eight weeks of photography in Malta would be followed by another week in San Francisco, CA.

With Ronald Lacey as Princess Aida, a 1982 article in Variety noted Trenchcoat may have been the first Disney release to feature an openly homosexual character.

== Release ==
The film was produced by Walt Disney Productions, but was not released under the Disney name, due to its more adult themes. Trenchcoat, Never Cry Wolf, and the international distribution of Dragonslayer are widely regarded as the films that led to the launch of Touchstone Pictures on February 15, 1984. The film was released on March 11, 1983 at movie theatres. It was released by Walt Disney Home Video label on VHS on May 21, 1983 and Buena Vista Home Entertainment label on DVD on January 31, 2012.

== Reception ==
The film was a box office failure, earning only a total of $4,304,286 domestically.

The film has been received negatively. Siskel and Ebert named it one of the "Stinkers of 1983".
