= Corwin (TV series) =

Canadian television series

- Created by: Sandor Stern
- Written by: Sandor Stern
- Directed by: Peter Carter; Daryl Duke; Ronald Weyman
- Starring: John Horton; Alan King; Ruth Springford; Robert Warner
- Country of origin: Canada
- Original language: English
- No. of seasons: 2

Production
- Executive producer: Ronald Weyman
- Running time: 60 minutes

Original release
- Network: CBC Television
- Release: 5 October 1969 – 3 January 1971

Corwin is a Canadian drama television series that aired on CBC Television from 1969 to 1971.

== Premise ==
Psychiatrist Greg Corwin (John Horton) establishes a general practice for the inner city. Other regular characters include Corwin's older assistant Doc James (Alan King), Mrs. Mackie or "Mac" (Ruth Springford) and Sergeant Bromley (Robert Warner).

The debut episode, "Does Anybody Here Know Denny?", guest stars Margot Kidder. Kidder was nominated for the Canadian Film Award for Best Actress in a Non Feature for her performance, and Springford won the Canadian Film Award for Best Supporting Actress in a Non-Feature for the same episode.

== Scheduling ==
Hour-long episodes were broadcast Sundays at 9:00 p.m. (Eastern) from 5 October to 2 November 1969 in the first season, and 22 November 1970 to 3 January 1971 for the second and final season.

The second season's run of Corwin was complicated by its inclusion in the Sunday at Nine timeslot which became a mixture of drama, variety—such as The Hart and Lorne Terrific Hour—and documentaries.

Although Corwin received a significant budget, the series consistency was hampered by the departures of director René Bonnière and writer Sandor Stern.

=== Series 1 (1969) ===
No. overall	No. in series	Title	Directed by	Written by	Original release date
1	1	"Does Anybody Here Know Denny? (Part 1)"	Peter Carter	Sandor Stern	5 October 1969
Dr. Greg Corwin falls for an heiress who seems to have mental health issues. With Margot Kidder.
2	2	"Does Anybody Here Know Denny? (Part 2)"	Peter Carter	Sandor Stern	12 October 1969
Now engaged to Denny, Corwin finds her problems run deeper than he imagined. With Margot Kidder.
3	3	"Apples of Gold in Pictures of Silver"	Daryl Duke	Sandor Stern	19 October 1969
The husband of a critically-ill patient must choose between the death of his wife, and the death of his unborn child.
4	4	"Boxful of Promises"	Ronald Weyman	Sandor Stern	26 October 1969
A wealthy miser lives a hermetic life in a run-down rooming house -- until one of Corwin's patients steals his hidden stash of cash.
5	5	"What Do You See When You Turn Out the Lights?"	Unknown	Sandor Stern	2 November 1969
A patient is frantic when a spiritualist predicts she has six weeks to live.

=== Series 2 (1970/71) ===
No. overall	No. in series	Title	Directed by	Written by	Original release date
6	1	"Who Is The Fat Cat?"	David Peddie	Sandor Stern	22 November 1970
A postman needs leg surgery to survive, but refuses the procedure. With Gordon Pinsent, and Ed Begley (who died several months before this episode was broadcast -- this was his last role).
7	2	"You Gotta Be Close to It All"	Unknown	Sandor Stern	29 November 1970
Corwin hospitalizes a woman with pneumonia, while his office staff looks after her 10-year-old son.
8	3	"How'd You Like To Visit Niagara Falls?"	Unknown	Unknown	6 December 1970
A hypochondriac writer is convinced he has cancer.
9	4	"You Can't Find Yesterday Tomorrow"	Unknown	Unknown	13 December 1970
Dr. Corwin is hospitalized in a hit-and-run incident.
10	5	"'Why' Is A Good Question"	Unknown	Unknown	20 December 1970
A middle-aged man collapses on the street -- cause unknown -- and Corwin and his staff rush to save him.
11	6	"Remember..."	Unknown	Unknown	27 December 1970
12	7	TBA	Unknown	Unknown	3 January 1971
