= Crime and Punishment (2002 Russian film) =

- Theatrical release poster
- Directed by: Menahem Golan
- Written by: Menahem Golan (as Joseph Goldman)
- Based on: Crime and Punishment; 1866 novel by Fyodor Dostoyevsky
- Produced by: Evgeny Afineevsky; Vladislav Dolzhenko; Menahem Golan; Ivan Mendzheritsky; Galina Tuchinsky
- Starring: Crispin Glover; Vanessa Redgrave; John Hurt; Margot Kidder
- Cinematography: Nicholas Josef von Sternberg
- Edited by: Carolle Alain
- Music by: Robert O. Ragland
- Production companies: Crime and Punishment Productions Limited; New Cannon
- Distributed by: Metro-Goldwyn-Mayer
- Release date: June 2002 (Russia)
- Running time: 126 minutes
- Countries: United States; Poland; Russia
- Language: English

Crime and Punishment is a 2002 drama film written and directed by Menahem Golan and starring Crispin Glover and Vanessa Redgrave. It is an adaptation of Fyodor Dostoyevsky's 1866 novel of the same name. The film was filmed in 1993 but not released until 2002.

== Plot ==
Though the story of Crime and Punishment was written and set in the 19th century, this film version takes place in the late 20th century. Rodion Raskolnikov, a student in his twenties who lives in Moscow, has published a paper in which he argues that certain superior individuals can legitimately ignore laws, even those against murder. He acts out this arrogant theory by murdering an old woman, who is a pawnbroker, and her sister, who accidentally witnesses the crime. In the aftermath, Raskolnikov is increasingly tortured by his conscience.

== Cast ==
- Crispin Glover as Rodion Romanovich Raskolnikov
- Vanessa Redgrave as Rodion's mother
- John Hurt as Porfiry, chief investigator
- Margot Kidder as Mrs. Katerina Marmeladova
- John Neville as Marmeladov, Sonia's alcoholic father
- Sophie Ward as Dunia, Rodion's sister
- Patricia Hayes as Alyona Ivanovna, old pawnbroker
- Theodore Bikel as Captain Koch
- Clive Revill as Zamyotov
- Ron Perlman as Dusharo
- Matt Servitto as Razumikhin, Rodion's friend
- Avital Dicker as Sonia Marmeladova, prostitute

== Release ==
The release of the film was restricted by legal matters that left it seized in a bankruptcy lien. It was eventually released in the UK on DVD by Prism Leisure Corporation.
