= Little Treasure =

- Theatrical release poster
- Directed by: Alan Sharp
- Written by: Alan Sharp
- Produced by: Herb Jaffe; Joanna Lancaster; Richard Wagner; Theodore R. Parvin
- Starring: Margot Kidder; Ted Danson; Burt Lancaster
- Cinematography: Álex Phillips Jr
- Edited by: Garth Craven
- Music by: Leo Kottke
- Distributed by: Tri-Star Pictures
- Release date: May 1, 1985
- Running time: 95 minutes
- Country: United States
- Language: English

Little Treasure is a 1985 American action drama film starring Margot Kidder, Ted Danson and Burt Lancaster. The film, written and directed by Alan Sharp, deals with the strained relationship between a bank robber father and his daughter, a stripper.

== Plot ==
Margo, a stripper searching for her estranged, bank robber father in a remote part of Mexico. Along the way, Margo meets an American ex-pat drifter, and together they search for her missing father and eventually his lost, buried fortune.

== Cast ==
- Margot Kidder as Margo
- Ted Danson as Eugene Wilson
- Burt Lancaster as Delbert Teschemacher
- Joseph Hacker as Norman Kane
- Malena Doria as Evangelina
- John Pearce as Joseph
- Gladys Holland as Sadie
- Bill Zuckert as Charlie Parker
- James Hall as Chuck
- Glenda Moore as Kane's Friend
- Rodolfo De Alexandre as Bird Seller
- Lupe Ontiveros as Market Voice #1

== Production ==
Kidder recalled feuding with Lancaster during the production and described Danson as "about as sweet a guy as you’re ever gonna meet. What you see is what you get. He’s lovely."

== Reception ==
Leonard Maltin gave the film one and a half stars.
