= Quackser Fortune Has a Cousin in the Bronx =

1970 American film by Waris Hussein

- American theatrical poster
- Directed by: Waris Hussein
- Written by: Gabriel Walsh
- Produced by: Mel Howard; John H. Cushingham
- Starring: Gene Wilder; Margot Kidder
- Cinematography: Gilbert Taylor
- Edited by: Bill Blunden
- Music by: Michael Dress
- Distributed by: Scotia-Barber (United Kingdom); UMC Pictures (United States)
- Release dates: 13 July 1970 (New York City); 9 June 1972 (Ireland)
- Running time: 90 minutes
- Countries: Ireland; United States
- Language: English
- Budget: $850,000–$900,000

Quackser Fortune Has a Cousin in the Bronx is a 1970 comedy film directed by Waris Hussein, written by Gabriel Walsh, and starring Gene Wilder and Margot Kidder. It focuses on a poor Irish manure collector (Wilder) who falls in love with an American exchange student (Kidder) after she almost runs him over.

== Plot ==
Quackser Fortune earns a living in Dublin by collecting horse manure and selling it to locals for garden fertilizer. Quackser has an affair with Betsy Bourke, a housewife who is one of his customers.

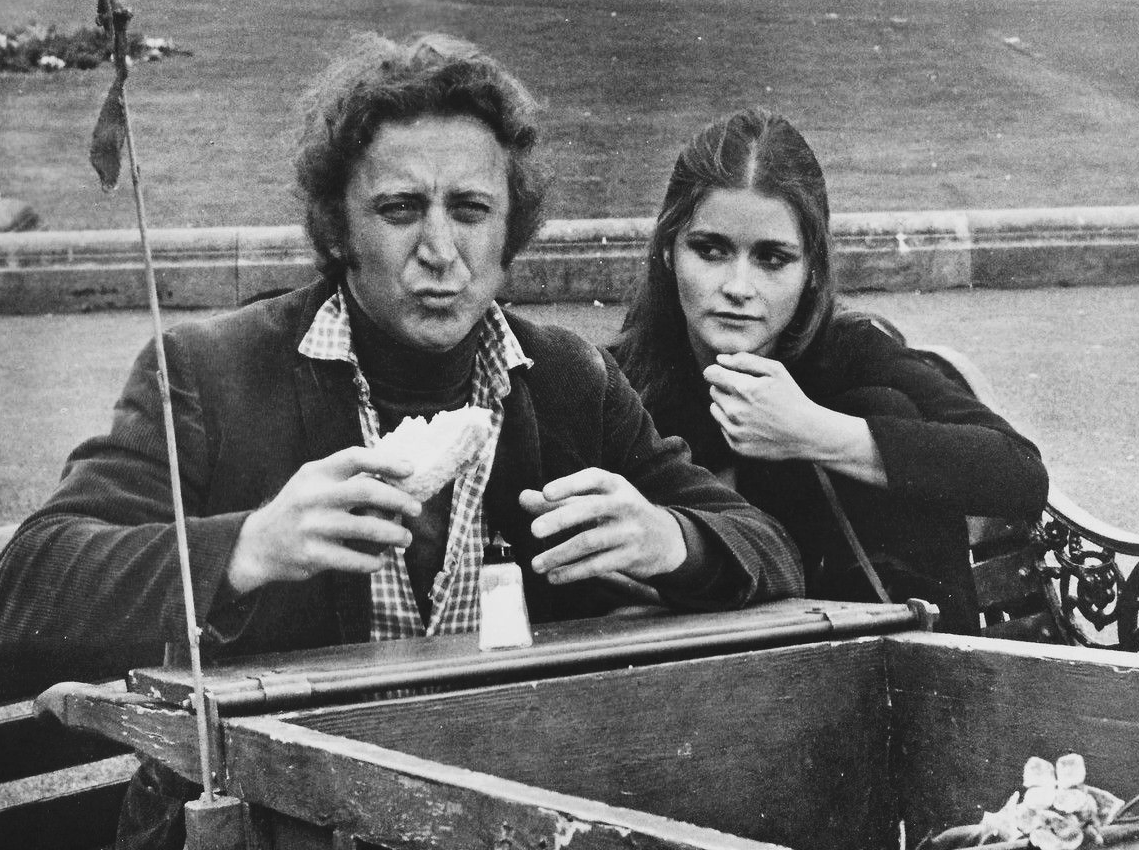
Gene Wilder and Margot Kidder in a scene from the film

One day, Quackser is almost run over by Zazel Pierce, a wealthy American exchange student from Connecticut studying abroad at Trinity College. Quackser takes an immediate liking to Zazel, who helps educate him on Irish history. Zazel invites Quackser to a dress ball held by the college, but upon his arrival, she opts to ignore him, instead associating with her sophisticated classmates. The students' taunting of Quackser results in a fight, during which he escapes with Zazel. The two spent the night at an upscale hotel, where the two have sex before she leaves him for the night.

The following day, Quackser attempts to confront Zazel at her dormitory on the college campus, only to learn she has moved out. He is further dismayed upon learning of a new city ordinance banning horses on the streets of Dublin, which threatens his livelihood collecting and delivering horse manure. In retaliation, Quackser releases his horses into the city streets in order to prevent them from being taken to a slaughterhouse and used as animal glue.

A dejected Quackser spends the evening binge drinking, but his spirits are lifted when he learns that a distant cousin of his who lives in the Bronx, New York City, has died and left him over £200. Upon receiving the money, he uses it to purchase a bus, and begins a new business enterprise giving historical tours of Dublin to tourists.

== Cast ==
- Gene Wilder as Aloysius "Quackser" Fortune
- Margot Kidder as Zazel Pierce
- Eileen Colgan as Betsy Bourke
- Seamus Forde as Mr. Fortune
- May Ollis as Mrs. Fortune
- Liz Davis as Kathleen Fortune
- Caroline Tully as Vera Fortune
- David Kelly as Tom Maguire
- David Davin-Power (uncredited extra)

== Production ==
The film was shot on location in Dublin, with principal photography beginning on 25 August 1969. Filming was completed by November of that year. Part of the film was shot at Dublin's Ardmore Studios. While the budget was initially estimated at $1.2 million, executive producer Mel Howard later stated the film ultimately cost between $850,000 and $900,000 to produce.

== Release ==
UMC Pictures released Quackser Fortune Has a Cousin in the Bronx in the United States on 13 July 1970, premiering it in New York City at the Coronet Theatre. The film had its Los Angeles opening that fall, on 14 October 1970. The film opened in Ireland on 9 June 1972.

=== Home media ===
The film was released on DVD on September 7, 1999. VCI Home Entertainment released the film for the first time on Blu-ray on 11 March 2025.

== Reception ==
=== Critical response ===
Kathleen Carroll of the New York Daily News praised Wilder's performance, and summarized the picture as a "truly disarming film to warm the heart." Joseph Gelmis of Newsday similarly praised Wilder's "superlative tragicomic performance" and added that Kidder is "precisely right" in her role.

Vincent Canby of The New York Times stated that the film is "a well‐meaning, professional Irish comedy, nicely acted, prettily photographed (mostly through the sort of wide angle lenses favored by photographers who contribute to travel brochures), and very likely to set your teeth on edge."

Fergus Linehan of The Irish Times praised the film as "a gentle, sunny and thoroughly enjoyable picture… which does Dublin and Dubliners proud."

=== Accolades ===
The film was nominated for Best Comedy Written Directly for the Screen (WGA Award – Screen) at the Writers Guild of America, awards in 1971.
