= A Quiet Day in Belfast =

- Directed by: Milad Bessada
- Written by: play Andrew Dalrymple screenplay Jack Gray
- Produced by: Milad Bessada
- Starring: Barry Foster; Margot Kidder
- Cinematography: Harry Makin
- Edited by: Simon Dew
- Music by: Greg Adams; Eric N. Robertson
- Production company: Twinbay Media International
- Distributed by: Ambassador Film Distributors
- Release date: 17 May 1974 (Canada)
- Running time: 88 minutes
- Country: Canada
- Language: English

A Quiet Day in Belfast is a 1974 Canadian drama film set in Northern Ireland and starring Barry Foster, Margot Kidder and Sean McCann. British soldiers battle the Provisional Irish Republican Army in early 1970s Belfast. The film was based on a play by Andrew Dalrymple and was filmed in Dublin, in the Republic of Ireland.

== Plot summary ==
Charlie McLarnon, a Protestant Northern Irish dog breeder, has been training and fasting his greyhound "Duke of Donegal" in preparation for a race. On the day of the race he is spied upon, and rumor of the dog's speed quickly spreads.

John Slattery is a middle-aged, single Catholic Northern Irishman who manages a betting shop in Belfast. The shop is owned by Mr. Collins (née Spiegel), an Austrian-Jewish immigrant. John's only employee is Tim Horgan, a naive young man with a speech defect. The shop has a small group of regulars, notably Mrs. McDuatt, a cantankerous widow pensioner. Mr. Collins phones John to tell him he is preparing to sell the shop, and instructs John and Tim to get the shop in order for the buyer's viewing.

John lives at home with his mother and his younger sister Brigit Slattery, who has a British soldier for a boyfriend. The soldier and his comrades are stationed nearby to keep the peace in the neighborhood, armed with tear gas and shields, while local boys regularly hurl rocks and insults at them. When Brigit reveals she and the soldier are engaged to be married, John strongly disapproves.

Peter O'Lurgan, a Catholic serial bomber wanted by the authorities, is a friend of John's and a hero of Tim's. On this day he imposes on John to use the betting shop as a safe house to work on a pair of bombs and enlists Tim's aid in planting them. The betting shop is usually quiet, but on this day a steady stream of punters betting on "Duke of Donegal" forces John to take measures to cover the spread. Meanwhile, Peter arms the two bombs he has built, one timed for twelve minutes and the other for two hours, and instructs Tim to place the twelve-minute bomb in a nearby grocery store. After Tim leaves, Peter discovers Tim has taken the wrong bomb, and disarms the twelve-minute bomb with moments to spare. When Tim returns, Peter makes Tim aware of his mistake, causing him to faint.

Brigit has an identical twin sister, Thelma, who married and emigrated to Canada years ago and has recently returned to visit the family. Brigit and Thelma are reunited and go shopping, buying a pair of identical polka-dot dresses. Thelma wears her dress outside and is kidnapped by three youths who mistake her for Brigit and disapprove of Brigit's engagement to the British soldier. They bind and gag Thelma, drive her to a secret location, tie her to a post and tar and feather her.

Peter resets the timer of the bomb in the betting shop and goes to the grocery store himself to retrieve and reset the two-hour bomb. He leaves the grocery store with the bomb and heads back toward the betting shop. He is swarmed by a group of young boys recently scattered by tear gas from the soldiers. The boys steal the paper bag containing Peter's bomb and pass it around in front of him. The bomb detonates, critically injuring Peter and most of the boys. The explosion attracts John, to whom Peter gives his gun and an urgent warning to disarm the other bomb.

The "Duke of Donegal" has won the race and most of the punters who bet on the dog promptly return to the shop to collect their winnings. Tim is working alone in the shop and is overwhelmed by the customers, with insufficient funds to cover the bets. Just then Mr. Collins and his buyer appear outside. The bomb detonates, killing everyone inside the shop. The shop buyer is also killed and an injured Mr. Collins enters the shop to survey the carnage. The "Duke of Donegal", the lone survivor, runs outside.

Hearing the blast of the second bomb, John hurries toward the shop, holding Peter's gun. On his way there, the three youths stop their car in front of him and dump the tarred and feathered Thelma on the curb. John, mistaking her for Brigit, shoots the three youths. Brigit's soldier fiancé arrives, also mistakes Thelma for Brigit, and assumes John is the one who assaulted her. John is shot by the soldier before he can identify himself and explain the situation. The soldier in turn is shot by a rooftop sniper. The closing camera shot zooms in on a pair of Catholic and Protestant churches, physically close together but divided by ideology, symbolizing the Northern Irish troubles.

== Cast ==
- Barry Foster - John Slattery
- Margot Kidder - Brigit Slattery / Thelma Slattery
- Sean McCann - Peter O'Lurgan
- Leo Leyden - Charlie McLarnon
- Mel Tuck - Tim Horgan
- Joyce Campion - Mrs McDuatt
- Sean Mulcahy - Mike Mahoney
- Emmet Bergin - Jack Jameson
- Donald Reynolds - Boy heckler
- Antony Parr - Mr. Collins
- David Stewart - Major McGinnis
- Gillie Fenwick - Mr. Harrowgate
- Robert McKenna - Harry Doherty
- Syd Brown - Fiddler McGinn
- Gerald Crack - Nigel Godfrey

== Awards ==
Margot Kidder won Best Performance by a Lead Actress at the Canadian Film Awards in 1975. The film was also a nominee for Best Feature Film, but did not win.
