= Pygmalion (1983 film) =

- promotional still
- Genre: Comedy
- Based on: Pygmalion; 1913 play by George Bernard Shaw
- Directed by: Alan Cooke
- Starring: Peter O'Toole; Margot Kidder
- Music by: Cliff Jones
- Country of origin: United States
- Original language: English

Production
- Executive producers: Harold Greenberg; Paul Heller
- Producers: Dan Redler; Margot Kidder; Richard C. Baker
- Editor: Bernie Clayton
- Running time: 107 minutes
- Production companies: 20th Century Fox Television; Astral Film Productions

Original release
- Network: Showtime
- Release: July 14, 1983

Pygmalion is a 1983 American made-for-Showtime comedy film starring and produced by Margot Kidder as Eliza Doolittle and Peter O'Toole as Professor Henry Higgins.

== Cast ==
- Peter O'Toole as Professor Henry Higgins
- Shelagh McLeod as Clara
- Nancy Kerr as Mrs. Eynsford-Hill
- Ron White as Freddie Eynsford-Hill
- Margot Kidder as Eliza Doolittle
- John Standing as Colonel Pickering
