= The Hi-Line =

1999 American film by Ron Judkins

- Directed by: Ron Judkins
- Written by: Ron Judkins
- Produced by: Molly M. Mayeux; Collin Walsh Phillips
- Starring: Rachael Leigh Cook; Ryan Alosio; Margot Kidder; Tantoo Cardinal; Stuart Margolin; Rainer Judd
- Cinematography: Wally Pfister
- Edited by: Charlie Webber
- Music by: Jon Huck
- Distributed by: Creative Light
- Release dates: January 1999 (Sundance); May 5, 2000 (United States)
- Running time: 95 minutes
- Country: United States
- Language: English

The Hi-Line is a 1999 drama film by Ron Judkins which is set in the Hi-Line region of Montana. The film stars Rachael Leigh Cook and Ryan Alosio.

== Plot ==
A headhunter for a Chicago-based retail chain arrives in a small Montana town and contacts a young woman with an offer to interview her for a job. She is still living with what she believes to be her parents. In reality, the headhunter has been sent by a friend, the woman's real father, who is serving a sentence in Joliet Prison. Her father, who wants her to know who her real parents are, is about to die while in prison. Her real mother lives outside of a different Montana town. When her parents split apart, they put the newborn girl up for adoption. She was never told she was adopted, and when she learns the news, she travels to confront her real mother out of anger. The headhunter goes with her, and the two develop a romantic relationship on the way.

== Release ==
The Hi-Line premiered in the Dramatic Competition at the 1999 Sundance Film Festival. It won the Audience Award at the 1999 Austin Film Festival.
