= Rachael Leigh Cook =

American actress and model (born 1979)

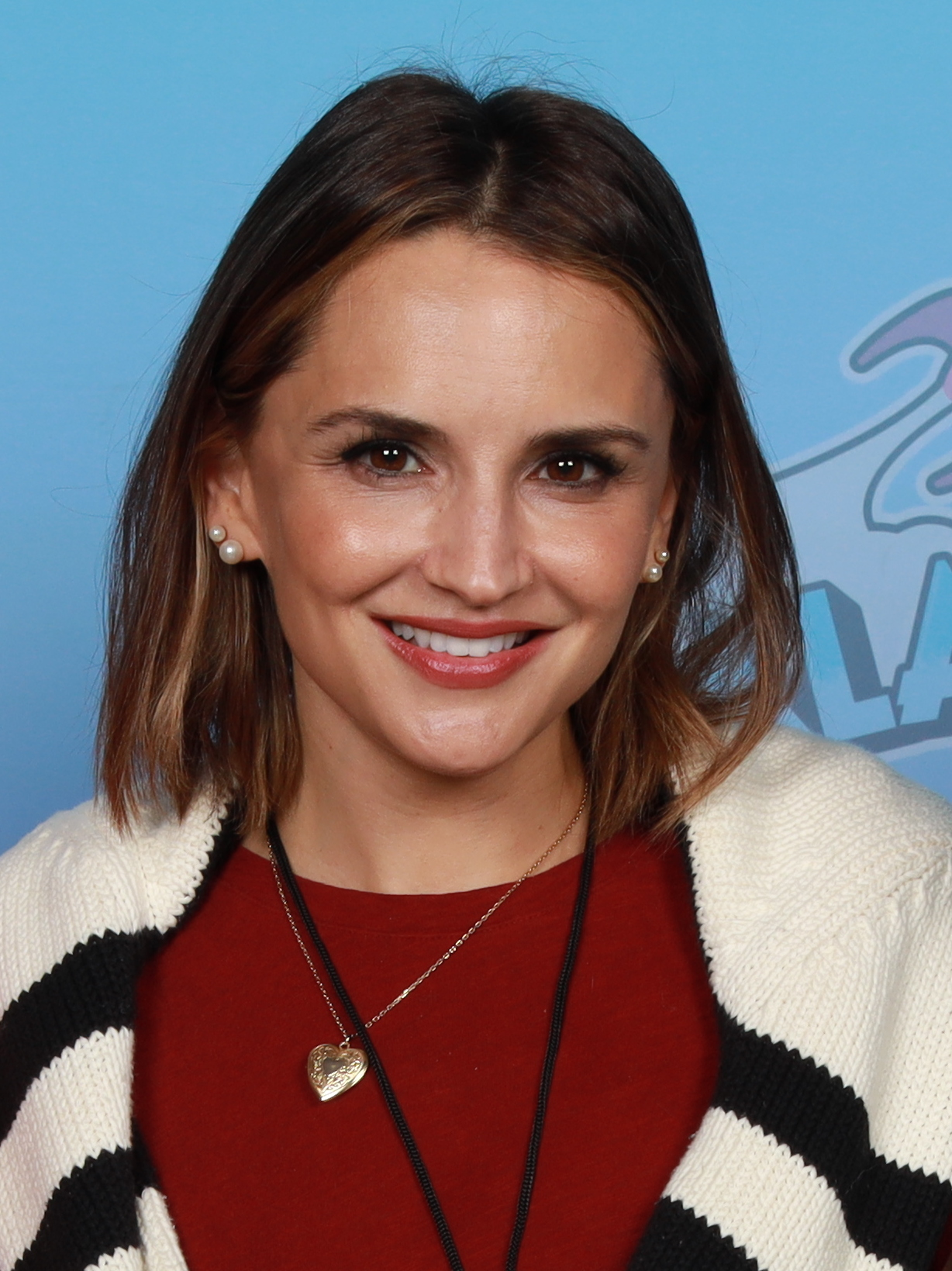
- Cook in 2024
- Born: October 4, 1979 (age 47); Minneapolis, Minnesota, U.S.
- Occupations: Actress; model
- Years active: 1995–present
- Spouse: Daniel Gillies (m. 2004; div. 2021)
- Children: 2

Rachael Leigh Cook (born October 4, 1979) is an American actress and model. She has starred in the films The Baby-Sitters Club (1995), She's All That (1999), and Josie and the Pussycats (2001), and in the television series Into the West and Perception. She is also the voice behind various characters in Robot Chicken and Tifa Lockhart in the Final Fantasy series, starting with the English version of the film Final Fantasy VII: Advent Children. Since 2016, her television appearances have primarily been made-for-TV movies on the Hallmark Channel.

== Early life ==
Rachael Leigh Cook was born on October 4, 1979, in Minneapolis, Minnesota, the daughter of Thomas Howard Cook, a social worker and former stand-up comedian, and JoAnn, a cooking instructor and weaver. She is of part English and Italian descent. Cook first appeared in a public service announcement for foster care at seven years of age and began working as a child print model at the age of 10, including nationwide advertisements for Target and appearing on the boxes of Milk-Bone dog biscuits. She attended Clara Barton Open School, Laurel Springs School, and Minneapolis South High School.

== Career ==
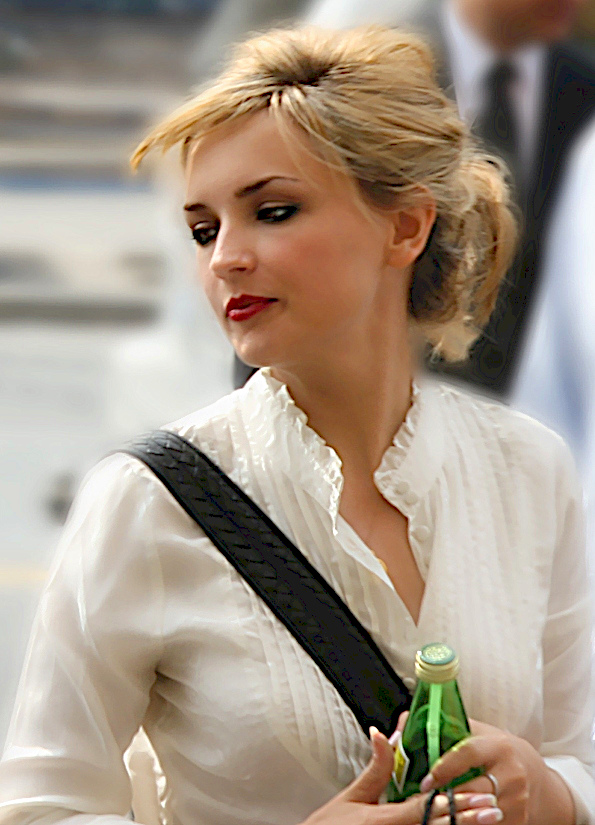
Cook at the Toronto International Film Festival in 2007

Cook began auditioning for acting work at age 14. She made her screen debut as an actress in the 1995 film The Baby-Sitters Club. She also played a role in the adventure film Tom and Huck, released in December 1995. In 1996, her modeling agency sent her to star in a short film, 26 Summer Street. In 1997, Cook appeared in a leading role in the film Country Justice as a 15-year-old rape victim who is impregnated by her rapist.

In 1999, Cook starred in her breakout role in the romantic comedy film She's All That, the most financially successful film of her career. In 2000, she starred opposite Elijah Wood in the well-received The Bumblebee Flies Anyway. She took the lead role in 2001's Josie and the Pussycats, which turned out to be a box office failure, although it has since become a cult classic.

In 2000, she was the cover girl for the U.S. March/April issue of FHM. She also starred in the music video for New Found Glory's 2000 single "Dressed to Kill". In 2002, she was ranked No. 26 in Stuff magazine's "102 Sexiest Women in the World". In 2003, she starred in the film 11:14 as Cheri. She also appeared as a main cast member in the 2005 television miniseries Into the West produced by Steven Spielberg. In 2006, she appeared in the music video for Daniel Powter's "Love You Lately".

In 2007, Cook was seen in the big screen adaptation of Nancy Drew. She played the female lead in the independent sports drama The Final Season. She has appeared in numerous episodes of the Seth Green comedies Titan Maximum and Robot Chicken. In 2008, she guest-starred as Abigail Lytar in two third-season episodes of the USA Network series Psych. She reprised the role in the following season.

In February 2010, Cook signed on to play the female lead role in Fox TV's comedy pilot Nirvana. She had a role in the Western horror film Vampire, the English-language feature debut of Japanese director Iwai Shunji. In 2012, Cook signed on to play the female lead role in the TNT crime drama series Perception opposite Eric McCormack. She starred in the independent film Broken Kingdom, which was directed by her husband Daniel Gillies. She also appeared in a Funny or Die sketch with Chad Michael Murray.

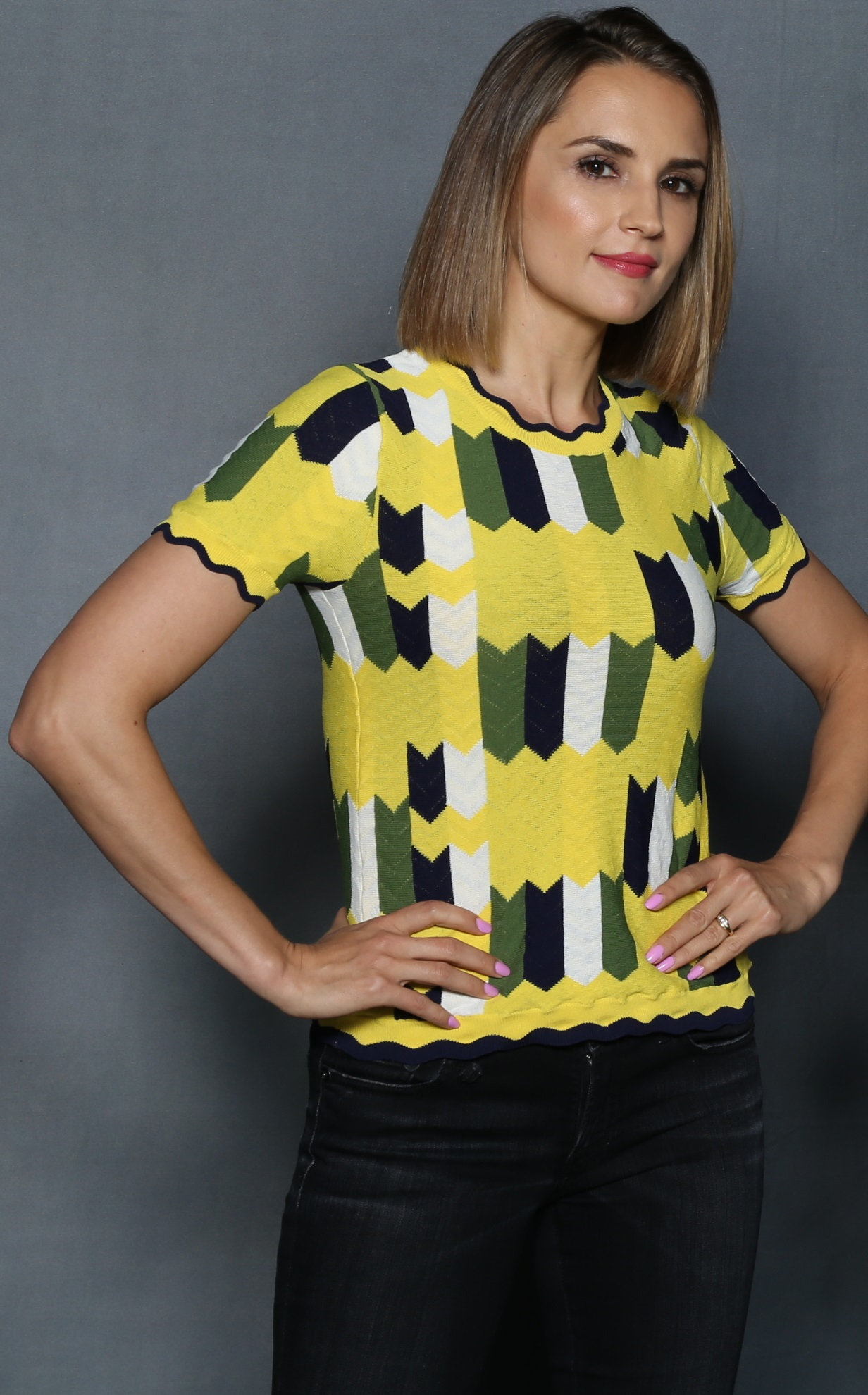
Cook in 2018

Cook starred in the Hallmark Channel original film Summer Love in 2016. In the same year, she starred in another Hallmark film, Autumn In the Vineyard, followed by its sequel Summer in the Vineyard in 2017. 2017 also saw Cook develop, star and executive produce the Hallmark Channel film Frozen in Love, which was broadcast in January 2018 as part of the channel's 'Winterfest' season of programming.

Cook provided the voice for Chelsea Cunningham on the Kids' WB animated series Batman Beyond and in the animated film Batman Beyond: Return of the Joker. Cook voiced Tifa Lockhart in the video games Kingdom Hearts II, Dirge of Cerberus: Final Fantasy VII and Dissidia 012 Final Fantasy, as well as the film Final Fantasy VII Advent Children. In 2011, she voiced the character of Jaesa Willsaam in the MMO game, Star Wars: The Old Republic. Cook's latest voice-over role is for the video game Yakuza in which she voices the role of Reina. In 2020 Cook appeared in the fifteenth season of Criminal Minds playing the role of Max in the final episodes of the series.

Cook owns her own production company, Ben's Sister Productions (in reference to her younger brother Ben Cook). She produced and starred in the film Love, Guaranteed, which debuted on Netflix on September 3, 2020.

== Public service ==
Cook first gained national attention in 1997, when she was featured in an updated This Is Your Brain on Drugs public service announcement (PSA) television advertisement, in which she proceeds to destroy a kitchen with a frying pan.

In 2011, she was selected by the Obama administration as a Champion of Change for Arts Education.

In June 2012, she began to award a small scholarship to students between ages 14 and 19. The scholarship helps pay for career classes, mentoring programs, and other school fees.

In 2017, Rachael Leigh Cook reprised her "This Is Your Brain on Drugs" role twenty years later for a PSA by the Drug Policy Alliance critiquing the war on drugs and its contribution to mass incarceration, societal racism and poverty. The ad was posted to YouTube on April 20, 2017, in recognition of 4/20.

== Personal life ==
Cook married New Zealand-Canadian actor Daniel Gillies on August 8, 2004, saying: "We got engaged after dating for maybe five months and we got married a couple of months after that". They have two children: a daughter born in September 2013 and a son born in April 2015. The couple separated in June 2019 and divorced in 2021.

As of July 2025, Cook has been dating American actor, Brandon Routh.

Cook is a vegetarian.

== Filmography ==
=== Film ===
Year	Title	Role	Notes
1995	The Baby-Sitters Club	Mary Anne Spier	
1995	Tom and Huck	Becky Thatcher	
1996	Carpool	Kayla	
1997	The House of Yes	Young Jackie-O	
1997	Country Justice	Emma Baker	
1997	The Eighteenth Angel	Lucy Stanton	
1998	All I Wanna Do	Abigail "Abby" Sawyer	
1998	The Naked Man	Dolores	
1998	Living Out Loud	Teenage Judith Moore	
1999	The Hi-Line	Vera Johnson	
1999	She's All That	Laney Boggs	
1999	The Bumblebee Flies Anyway	Cassie	
2000	Sally	Beth	
2000	Get Carter	Doreen Carter	
2000	Batman Beyond: Return of the Joker	Chelsea Cunningham	Voice; direct-to-video
2001	Antitrust	Lisa Calighan	
2001	Blow Dry	Christina Robertson	
2001	Texas Rangers	Caroline Dukes	
2001	Josie and the Pussycats	Josie McCoy	
2001	Tangled	Jenny Kelley	
2002	29 Palms	The Waitress	
2003	Bookies	Hunter McGuire	
2003	Scorched	Shmally	
2003	The Big Empty	Ruthie	
2003	11:14	Cheri	
2003	Tempo	Jenny Travile	
2004	Stateside	Dori Lawrence	
2004	American Crime	Jesse St. Claire	Direct-to-video
2005	Final Fantasy VII: Advent Children	Tifa Lockhart	Voice
2006	My First Wedding	Vanessa	Direct-to-video
2007	Descent	Allison	Direct-to-video
2007	All Hat	Chrissie Nugent	Direct-to-video
2007	Nancy Drew	Jane Brighton	
2007	The Final Season	Polly Hudson	
2007	Blonde Ambition	Haley	
2009	The Lodger	Amanda Manning	Direct-to-video
2009	Bob Funk	Ms. Thorne	Direct-to-video
2009	Falling Up	Caitlin O'Shea	Direct-to-video
2011	Vampire	Laura King	Direct-to-video
2011	The Family Tree	Rachel Levy	Direct-to-video
2012	Broken Kingdom	Marilyn	Direct-to-video
2014	Red Sky	Karen Brooks	Direct-to-video
2017	A Midsummer Night's Dream	Hermia	
2020	Love, Guaranteed	Susan	Also producer
2021	He's All That	Anna Sawyer	
2022	Spirit Halloween: The Movie	Sue	
2023	A Tourist's Guide to Love	Amanda Riley	Also producer

=== Television ===
Year	Title	Role	Notes
1997	True Women	Young Georgia Lawshe	Miniseries
1997	The Defenders: Payback	Tracey Lane	TV movie
1998	The Outer Limits	Cassie Boussard	Episode: "Glyphic"
1999	Dawson's Creek	Devon	3 episodes
2000	Batman Beyond	Chelsea Cunningham	2 episodes; voice role
2004	Fearless	Gaia Moore	Unsold pilot
2005	Into the West	Clara Wheeler	Miniseries
2005	Las Vegas	Penny Posin	Recurring role
2005	I Love the '80s 3-D	Herself	TV documentary; 2 episodes
2006–2019	Robot Chicken	various	Recurring voice roles
2008	Ghost Whisperer	Grace Adams	Episode: "Big Chills"
2008–2010	Psych	Abigail Lytar	Recurring role
2009	Titan Maximum	Lt. Jodi Yanarella	Main cast; voice role
2010	Nevermind Nirvana	Elizabeth	Unaired pilot
2011	Stealing Paradise	Amanda Collier	TV movie
2012	Left to Die	Tammi Chase	TV movie
2012–2015	Perception	Kate Moretti	Main cast
2014	A Christmas Tail	N/A	TV movie
2016	Summer Love	Maya Sulliway	TV movie
2016	Autumn in the Vineyard	Frankie Baldwin	TV movie
2017	Summer in the Vineyard	Frankie Baldwin	TV movie
2018	Frozen in Love	Mary Campbell	TV movie
2019	Valentine in the Vineyard	Frankie Baldwin	TV movie
2019	A Blue Ridge Mountain Christmas	Willow Petersen	TV movie
2019	Liza on Demand	Rachael Leigh Cook	Episode: "New Year's Eve: Part 1" "New Year's Eve: Part 2"
2020	Criminal Minds	Maxine	2 episodes
2020	Cross Country Christmas	Lina	TV movie
2021	Tis the Season to Be Merry	Merry Griffin	TV movie
2023	Rescuing Christmas	Erin	TV movie
2025	Sisterhood Inc.	Megan	TV movie
2026	Caught by Love	Annie Collins	TV movie
2026	There She Goes	Molly	TV movie
2026	Double Booked for the Holidays	Abigail and Charlie	Hallmark TV movie

=== Music videos ===
Year	Title	Artist
1999	"Kiss Me" (She's All That version)	Sixpence None the Richer
2001	"Dressed to Kill"	New Found Glory
2006	"Love You Lately"	Daniel Powter
2013	"The UniCorps Wants You!"	Team Unicorn
2017	"Young Dumb & Broke"	Khalid

=== Video games ===
Year	Title	Role	Notes
2005	Yakuza	Reina	
2005	Kingdom Hearts II	Tifa Lockhart	
2006	Dirge of Cerberus: Final Fantasy VII	Tifa Lockhart	
2007	Kingdom Hearts II: Final Mix+	Tifa Lockhart	
2011	Dissidia 012 Final Fantasy	Tifa Lockhart	
2011	Star Wars: The Old Republic	Jaesa Willsaam	
2013	Star Wars: The Old Republic - Rise of the Hutt Cartel	Jaesa Willsaam	
2014	Star Wars: The Old Republic - Shadow of Revan	Jaesa Willsaam	
2016	Final Fantasy Explorers	Tifa Lockhart	Archive audio
2016	World of Final Fantasy	Tifa Lockhart	
2018	Mobius Final Fantasy	Tifa Lockhart	Archive audio
2019	Dissidia Final Fantasy NT	Tifa Lockhart	

== Awards and nominations ==
Year	Work	Award	Category	Result	Ref.
1997	Tom and Huck	YoungStar Award	Best Performance by a Young Actress in a Comedy Film	Nominated	
1999	She's All That	YoungStar Awards	Best Performance by a Young Actress in a Comedy Film	Won	
1999	She's All That	MTV Movie Awards	Best Breakthrough Female Performance	Nominated	
1999	She's All That	MTV Movie Awards	Best On-Screen Duo (Shared with: Freddie Prinze Jr.)	Nominated	
1999	She's All That	Teen Choice Awards	Film – Sexiest Love Scene (Shared with: Freddie Prinze Jr.)	Won	
1999	Dawson's Creek	Teen Choice Awards	TV – Breakout Performance	Nominated	
2000	The Hi-Line	Santa Monica Film Festival	Best Actress	Won	
2000	She's All That	Kids' Choice Awards	Favorite Movie Couple (Shared with: Freddie Prinze Jr.)	Won	
2000	She's All That	Blockbuster Entertainment Awards	Favorite Actress – Newcomer (Internet Only)	Won	
2000	Sally	New York International Independent Film & Video Festival	Best Actress	Won	
2001	Herself	Young Hollywood Awards	Superstar of Tomorrow – Female	Won	
2001	Josie and the Pussycats	Teen Choice Awards	Film – Choice Actress	Nominated	
2006	Into the West	Western Heritage Awards	Television Feature Film (Shared with cast)	Won	
