= Margot Kidder =

Canadian and American actress and activist (1948–2018)

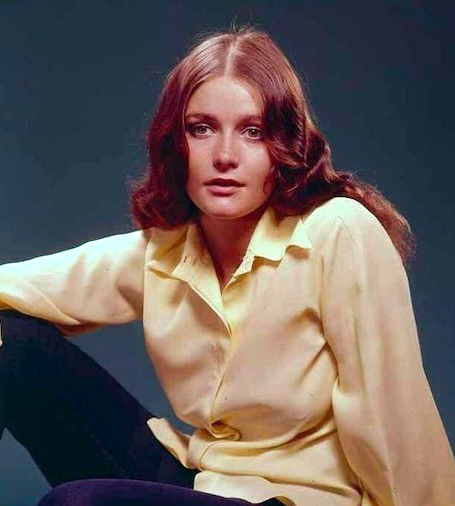
- Kidder in 1970
- Born: Margaret Ruth Kidder; October 17, 1948; Yellowknife, Northwest Territories, Canada
- Died: May 13, 2018 (aged 69); Livingston, Montana, U.S.
- Citizenship: Canada; United States (Note: From 2005.)
- Occupations: Actress; activist
- Years active: 1965–2018
- Works: Full list
- Spouses: Thomas McGuane (m. 1976; div. 1977); John Heard (m. 1979; div. 1980); Philippe de Broca (m. 1983; div. 1984)
- Children: 1

Margaret Ruth Kidder (/ˈmɑːrɡoʊ ˈkɪdər/; October 17, 1948 – May 13, 2018) was a Canadian-American actress and activist. She amassed several film and television credits in her career spanning five decades, including her widely known role as Lois Lane in the original Superman films (1978–1987). Her accolades included two Canadian Film Awards, an Emmy Award, a Genie Award, and a Saturn Award.

Born in Yellowknife to a Canadian mother and an American father, Kidder was raised in the Northwest Territories and several Canadian provinces. She began her acting career in the 1960s, appearing in low-budget Canadian productions and winning the Canadian Film Special Award in 1969. She first received attention for appearing in the comedy film Quackser Fortune Has a Cousin in the Bronx (1970), the horror films Sisters (1972), Black Christmas (1974), and The Reincarnation of Peter Proud (1975), and the drama films A Quiet Day in Belfast (1974) and The Great Waldo Pepper (1975).

Kidder's international breakthrough came with playing Lois Lane in Superman (1978) and Kathy Lutz in The Amityville Horror (1979), which were blockbuster films. For these roles, she was twice nominated for the Saturn Award for Best Actress, winning in 1978 for Superman. She reprised the role of Lois in three Superman sequels (1980–1987), and also played Rita Harris in the comedy film Heartaches (1981) and made her stage debut with the play Bus Stop (1982). After a stint of films and projects that were ambivalently received, Kidder sustained serious injuries in a car accident that left her temporarily paralyzed in 1990, and suffered from a highly publicized manic episode and nervous breakdown in 1996 stemming from bipolar disorder.

Kidder thereafter maintained steady work in independent films and television, notably appearing in the hockey film Chicks with Sticks (2004) and the horror picture Halloween II (2009), and playing a guest role on R.L. Stine's The Haunting Hour (2015). She maintained dual citizenship and was an outspoken political, environmental and antiwar activist. Kidder died on May 13, 2018, of an alcohol and drug overdose, which was ruled a suicide.

== Early life ==
Margaret Ruth Kidder, one of five children, was born on October 17, 1948, in Yellowknife, Northwest Territories, the daughter of Jocelyn Mary "Jill" (née Wilson), a history teacher from British Columbia, and Kendall Kidder, an American explosives expert and engineer originally from New Mexico. She was of Welsh and English descent.

Kidder was born in Yellowknife because of her father's employment, which required the family to live in remote locations. Her father subsequently served as the manager of the Yellowknife Telephone Company from 1948 to 1951. She had one sister, Annie, who is an actress and executive director of the People for Education charity, and three brothers: John, Michael, and Peter. Two of her siblings married notable Canadians: Annie married actor Eric Peterson and John married politician Elizabeth May. Kidder's niece Janet Kidder is also an actress.

Recalling her childhood in northern Canada, Kidder said: "We didn't have movies in this little mining town. When I was 12, my mom took me to New York [City] and I saw Bye Bye Birdie, with people singing and dancing, and that was it. I knew I had to go far away. I was clueless, but I [have done] okay." In addition to Yellowknife, she also spent some time growing up in Labrador City, Newfoundland and Labrador. Kidder became interested in politics at a young age, which she credited to debates which her parents had over the dinner table; her mother had socialist leanings, while her father was a conservative Republican.

Kidder had mental health issues from a young age, which stemmed from undiagnosed bipolar disorder. "I knew I was different, had these mind flights that other people didn't seem to have," she recalled. At age 14, she attempted suicide. Kidder found an outlet in acting, as she felt she could "let my real self out ... and no one would know it was me." "Nobody ever encouraged me to be an actress," she recalled. "It was taken as a joke... As a teenager, I envisioned myself in every book I read. I wanted to be Henry Miller and Thomas Wolfe. I wanted to eat everything on the world's platter, but my eyes were bigger than my stomach."

She attended several schools during her youth as a result of her family's relocations, eventually graduating from Havergal College, a high-school-level boarding school in Toronto, in 1966. In 1966, she found herself pregnant by her boyfriend, who arranged for an illegal abortion. The abortionist was located in a hotel room and filled Kidder's uterus with Lysol to terminate the pregnancy. After graduating from Havergal, Kidder relocated to Vancouver to attend the University of British Columbia, but dropped out after one year. She returned to Toronto, where she found work as a model.

== Career ==
=== 1960s ===
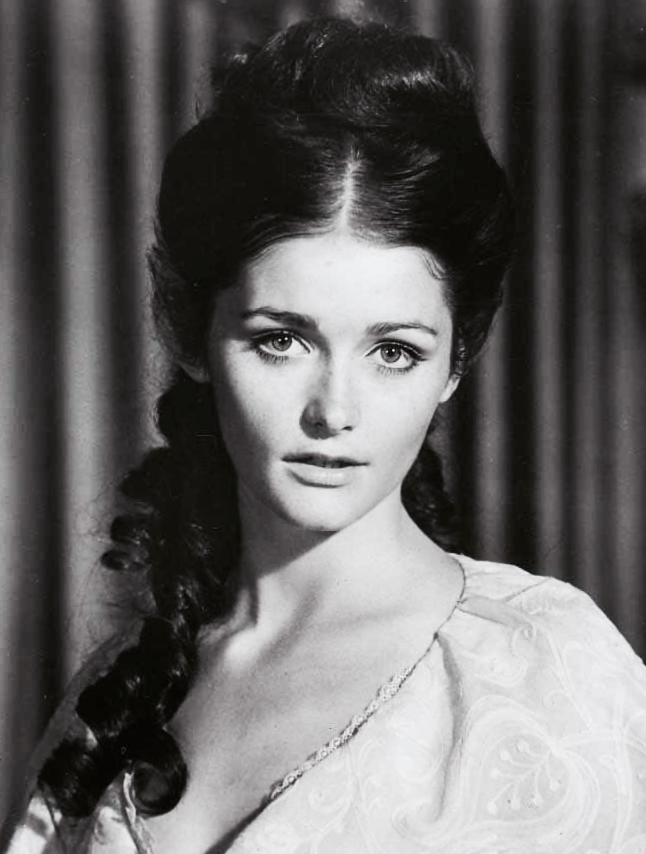
Kidder in 1969

Kidder's television debut was in an episode of Wojeck aired January 16, 1968, billed as "Margaret Kidder". She very shortly afterward adopted the name Margot Kidder, which she used for the rest of her life. She then made her film debut in a 49-minute film titled The Best Damn Fiddler from Calabogie to Kaladar (1968), a drama set in a Canadian logging community, which was produced by the Challenge for Change. Kidder's 1969 appearance in the episode "Does Anybody Here Know Denny?" on the Canadian drama series Corwin earned her a Canadian Film Award for "outstanding new talent."

Kidder's first major feature was the 1969 American film Gaily, Gaily, a period comedy starring Beau Bridges, in which she portrayed a prostitute. She subsequently appeared in a number of TV drama series for the CBC, including guest appearances on Adventures in Rainbow Country, and a semi-regular role as a young reporter on McQueen, and as a panelist on Mantrap, which featured discussions centered on a feminist perspective.

=== 1970s ===
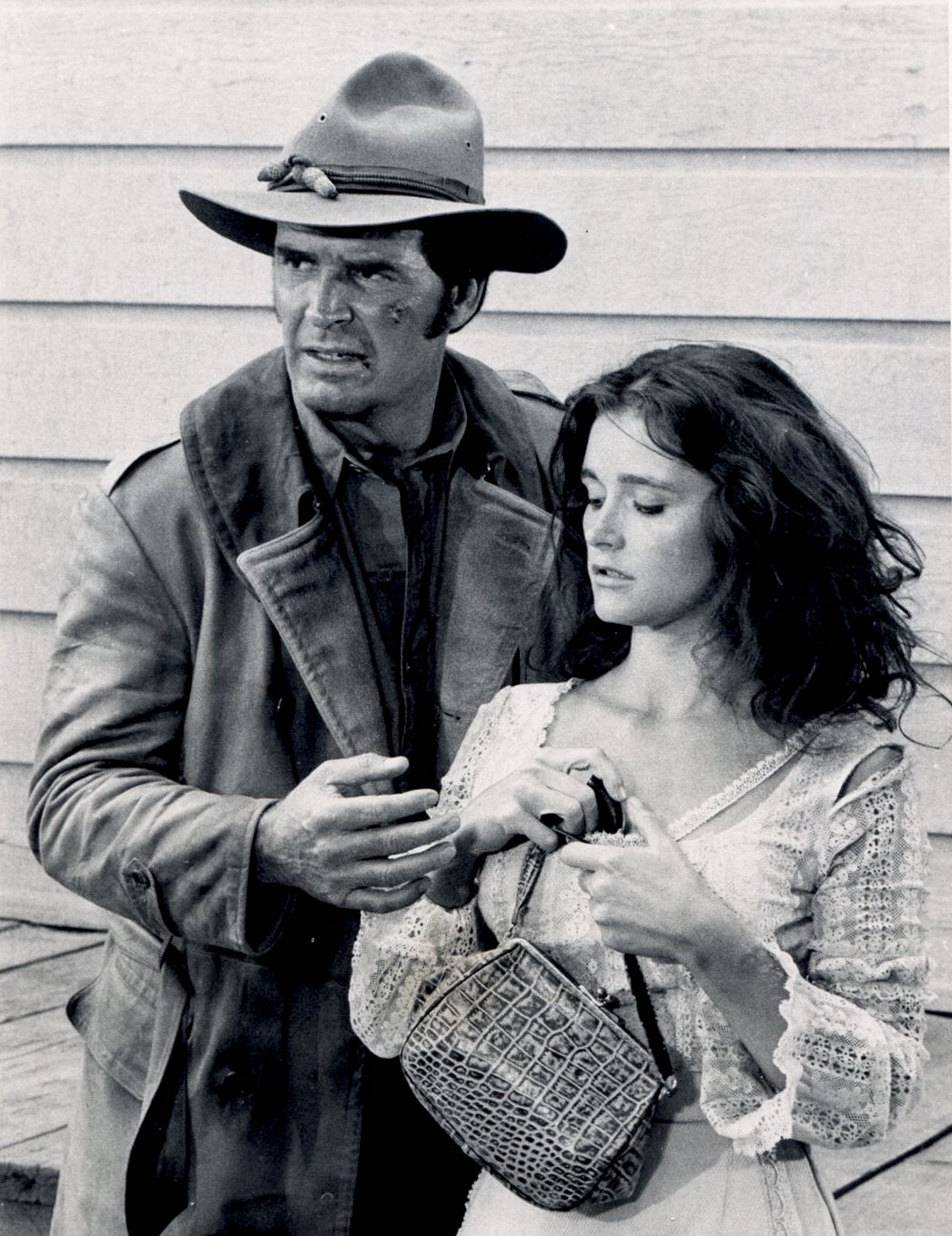
James Garner and Kidder in Nichols (1971)

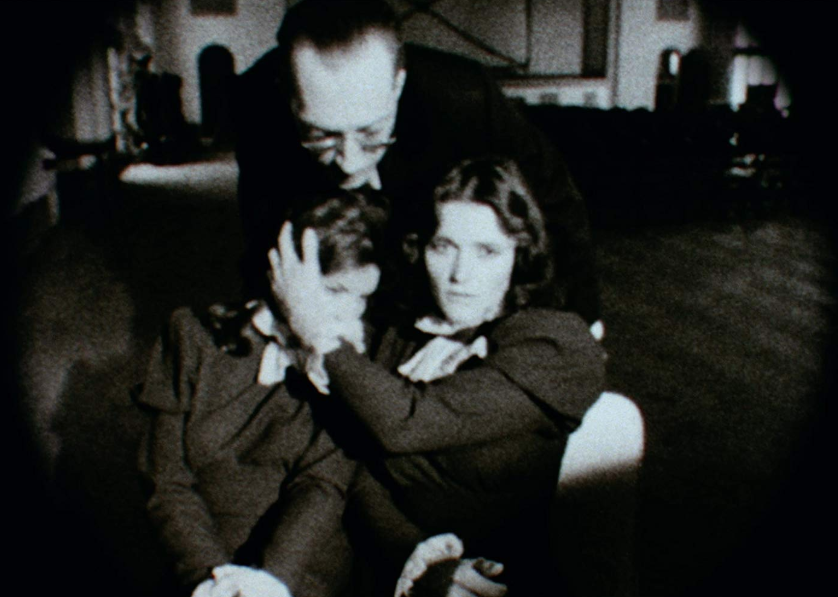
Kidder (right) with Jennifer Salt and William Finley in Sisters (1973)

During the 1971–72 season, she co-starred as barmaid Ruth in Nichols, a James Garner–led Western, which aired 22 episodes on NBC. During an August 3, 1970, interview on The Dick Cavett Show, Kidder stated that she was ambivalent toward having a film career, and was considering working as a film editor in the future. At this time, she had become an acquaintance of director Robert Altman, and served as an apprentice assisting him in editing Brewster McCloud (1970). She subsequently appeared in "Such Dust As Dreams Are Made On", the first pilot for Harry O, which aired in March 1973. She was a guest star in a 1972 episode of the George Peppard detective series Banacek.

After moving to Los Angeles, Kidder was cast opposite Gene Wilder in Quackser Fortune Has a Cousin in the Bronx (1970) as an exchange student in Ireland who becomes the love interest of a poor horse manure collector in Dublin, whom she almost runs over with her car. After filming in Ireland, Kidder relocated to New York City to study acting further. A year later, she returned to California, and was cast in the Brian De Palma film Sisters (1972), which gained notoriety for both the director and Kidder, who as leading lady, portrayed conjoined twins, one of whom is a suspect in a brutal murder. Kidder had been in a relationship with De Palma at the time, and had been roommates with co-star Jennifer Salt in Los Angeles. Sisters went on to achieve critical recognition, being considered among the best American films of the decade by critic Robin Wood, as well as one of the most important films in Kidder's career by film critic G. Allen Johnson.

In 1974, she starred in the slasher film Black Christmas, for which she won a Canadian Film Award for Best Actress, followed by a role as a prostitute in the Terrence Malick–scripted The Gravy Train (1974). She received another Canadian Film Award for Best Actress for her performance in the war drama A Quiet Day in Belfast (1974). Also in 1974, Kidder made her directorial debut with a 50-minute short film produced for the American Film Institute, titled Again. The film follows a woman who pastes photographs of her former lovers on her wall, continuously searching for "Mr. Right".

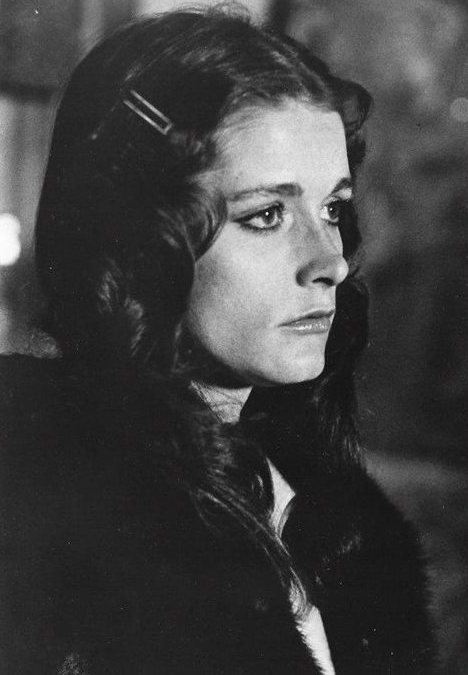
Kidder in The Reincarnation of Peter Proud (1975)

Kidder had a central supporting role in the airplane-themed drama The Great Waldo Pepper (1975) opposite Robert Redford and Susan Sarandon, followed by a lead role in the psychological horror film The Reincarnation of Peter Proud, directed by J. Lee Thompson, in which she portrayed a woman about whom a college professor has recurring nightmares. Variety praised her performance in the latter film as "outstandingly rich." In the summer of 1975, Kidder was hired to direct a documentary short chronicling the making of The Missouri Breaks (1976), a Western film starring Marlon Brando and Jack Nicholson. "I was such a jerk," she recalled. "I mean, I thought they wanted a real documentary. So, I filmed all the behind-the-scenes rows and arguments and shot footage of the vet shooting up the horses with tranquilizers so the actors would look as if they rode well. What an idiot I was. Then when they fired me, I realized what they'd wanted was a publicity film."

She subsequently co-starred with Peter Fonda in 92 in the Shade, also in 1975, a drama directed by novelist Thomas McGuane, based on his own book. Kidder then took a hiatus from acting, though she appeared in the March 9, 1975, edition of The American Sportsman, learning how to hang glide, and providing the narration, with a remote microphone recording her reactions in flight; the segment concluded with Kidder doing solos soaring amid the Wyoming Rockies. She was also photographed by Douglas Kirkland for the March 1975 issue of Playboy, accompanied by an article written by Kidder herself.

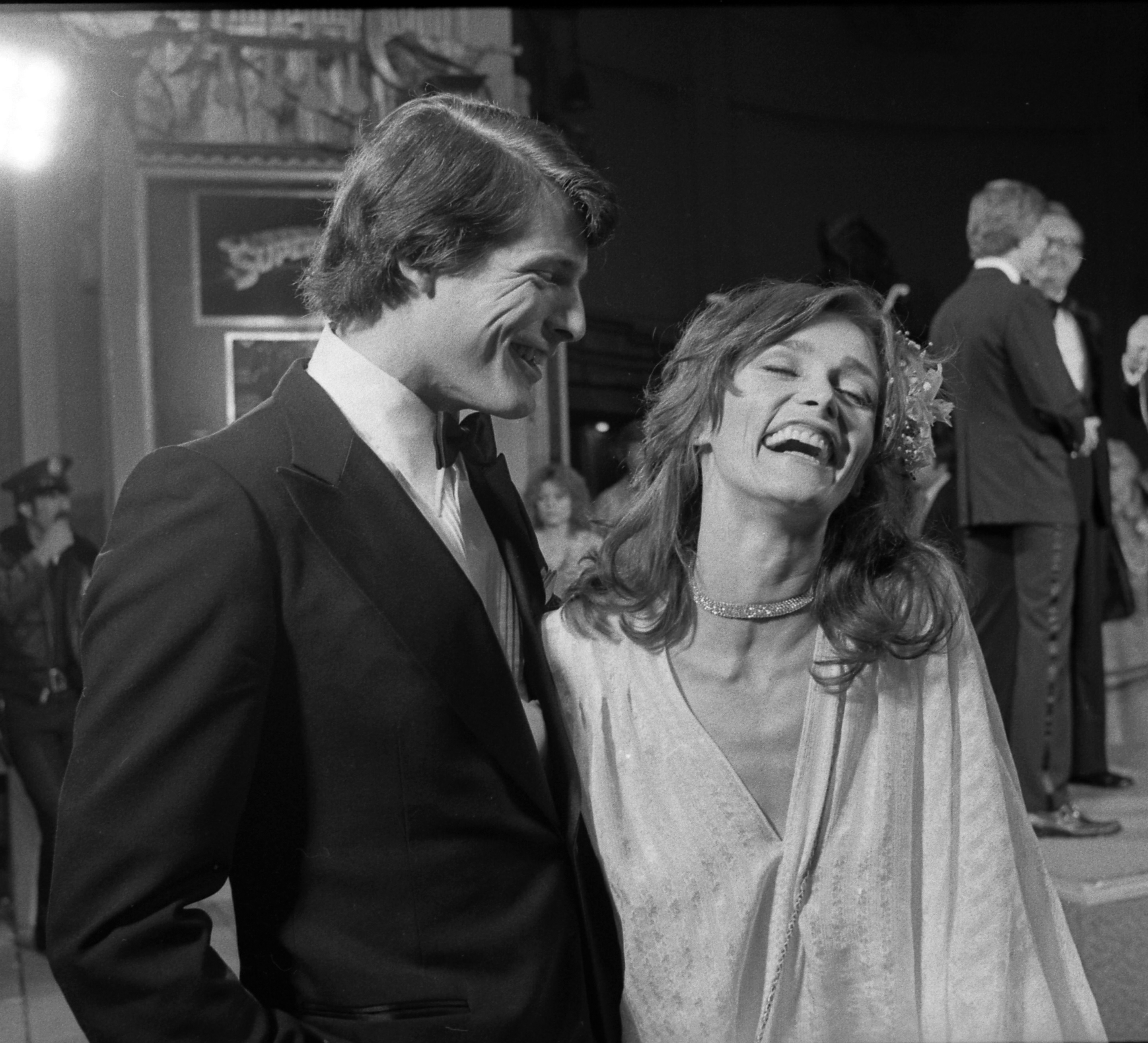
Christopher Reeve (left) and Kidder (right) at the premiere of Superman in 1978

In 1977, eager to return to acting, Kidder read for the character of Lois Lane in Superman: The Movie, only one month before principal photography was scheduled to begin. Kidder was flown to England for screen tests. Upon meeting with director Richard Donner, Kidder tripped while walking into the room. Donner recalled: "I just fell in love with her. It was perfect, this clumsy [behavior]." She was ultimately cast in the role, which would become her most iconic. Filming lasted about 18 months.

Superman was released during Christmas 1978 and was a major commercial success, grossing $300 million worldwide. She was deemed "most charming" by Vincent Canby in The New York Times. James Harwood of Variety said that she "plays perfectly off both of his [Reeve's] personalities and her initial double-entendre interview with Superman is wickedly coy, dancing round the obvious question any red-blooded girl might ask herself about such a magnificent prospect." Sonia Saraiya of Vanity Fair praised her ability to balance Lois's ditzy nature with her ambition and no-nonsense attitude, and wrote: "Kidder played a human woman who could believably both attract and deserve a man who is canonically perfect, with the physique of a Greek god and the moral compass of a saint." For the role, Kidder won the Saturn Award for Best Actress.

After completing filming for Superman, Kidder starred as Kathy Lutz in the supernatural horror film The Amityville Horror (1979), which further cemented her status as one of Hollywood's leading ladies. The Amityville Horror was a major commercial success, grossing over $86 million in the United States, but it received mixed reviews from critics. Janet Maslin of The New York Times, though giving the film a mixed review, said Kidder "stubbornly remains the bright-eyed life of the party [in the film]." In retrospect, Kidder called the film "a piece of shit." The same year, Kidder hosted an episode of the American sketch comedy TV show Saturday Night Live.

=== 1980s ===
Kidder reprised her role as Lois Lane in Superman II (1980), though she publicly disagreed with the decision of producers Alexander Salkind and Ilya Salkind to replace Richard Donner as director. Superman II was also a box-office hit, grossing $108 million in the United States. Through her appearances in the Superman films, Kidder maintained a close friendship with her co-star Christopher Reeve, which lasted from 1978 until his death in 2004: "When you're strapped to someone hanging from the ceiling for months and months, you get pretty darned close," Kidder told CBS. "He was such a huge part of my life... He was complicated, very smart, really smart, and he knew he'd done something meaningful. He was very aware of that and very happy with that role." Also in 1980, she appeared in Paul Mazursky's romantic comedy Willie & Phil, playing one-third of a love triangle opposite Michael Ontkean and Ray Sharkey.

Kidder starred in the Canadian comedic road movie Heartaches (1981), portraying a free-spirited woman who helps an acquaintance raise her child. Vincent Canby of The New York Times noted: "Nothing happens in Heartaches that isn't telegraphed 15 minutes ahead of time, but Miss Kidder and Miss [Annie] Potts are good fun to watch, not because they convince you of the reality of their characters but because they handle their assignments with such unbridled, comic, actressy enthusiasm." She then starred opposite Richard Pryor in the comedy Some Kind of Hero (1982), about a Vietnam War veteran who attempts to re-assimilate into civilian life. While filming the picture, Kidder stated she "fell in love with Pryor in two seconds flat," and the two carried on a relationship during the production. In 1982, she appeared in a stage performance of Bus Stop, playing Cherie opposite Tim Matheson as Bo, which was broadcast on HBO.

Kidder's role in 1983's Superman III was notably small, consisting of 12 lines and less than five minutes of footage. This was reportedly a result of her previous objections to Richard Lester replacing Richard Donner as director for Superman II, though the producers have denied this in DVD commentaries. The same year Superman III was released, Kidder also starred as a court stenographer-cum-private eye named Mickey Raymond in the comedy Trenchcoat (1983). Critic Roger Ebert disliked the film, deeming it "one of the most tired, predictable, uninteresting movies in a long time." Also in 1983, Kidder produced and starred as Eliza Doolittle in a version of Pygmalion with Peter O'Toole for Showtime.

In 1984, Kidder produced and starred in the French-Canadian period television film Louisiana as a plantation owner in the American South, who returns from Paris to find her estate and holdings have been lost. Also, she reunited with her former Nichols co-star, James Garner, in the Hollywood crime drama The Glitter Dome, and appeared in the drama Little Treasure for Columbia Tri-Star, with co-stars Ted Danson and Burt Lancaster, in which she played a distraught stripper looking for her bank robber-father's buried fortune.

In 1985, Kidder expressed ambivalence toward continuing her career, and was quoted as saying: "I don't feel comfortable as a performer and I'm a big turkey as a movie star." She stated that the quote was reported out of context, but conceded: "I am in a weird frame of mind at the moment. I know acting is not going to be enough for me for the rest of my life. This business is very hard on women at a certain age, and I never want to end up just having to accept what's offered me. So, I am anxious to direct, to have options."

In 1986, she was selected as the English narrator for the Japanese animated series The Wonderful Wizard of Oz. In 1987, Kidder reprised her Lois Lane role in Superman IV: The Quest for Peace (1987), which she filmed in 1986. Body of Evidence (1988), a CBS Movie of the Week, cast Kidder as a nurse who suspects that her medical pathologist husband is a serial killer.

=== 1990s ===
In the fall of 1990, Kidder appeared as a singer who becomes a murder victim in the Canadian television film White Room (1990). After her car accident, Kidder returned to the screen with an uncredited cameo appearance in the comedy film Delirious (1991), appearing as a woman in a washroom. This was followed by a role as a psychic in To Catch a Killer (1992), a Canadian television thriller film based on the crimes of John Wayne Gacy. She had several small roles in 1994, including in the Disney Channel film Windrunner, as well as another uncredited appearance in Maverick. She played a bartender at the Broken Skull Tavern in Under a Killing Moon, a PC FMV adventure game.

Kidder returned to film with a lead role in the independent comedy-drama Never Met Picasso (1997), portraying an actress living with her gay adult son (portrayed by Alexis Arquette), who is attempting to sort his life out. Kevin Thomas of the Los Angeles Times wrote, "Arquette and Kidder [were] given the chance to come across as quite appealing" in their roles. She next appeared in the slasher film The Clown at Midnight (1998), opposite Christopher Plummer, and alongside Lynn Redgrave and James Earl Jones in the romance film The Annihilation of Fish (1999), playing the landlady of an interracial couple. Critic Todd McCarthy in Variety referred to the film as a "would-be charmer" and "a drear moment in the careers of all concerned."

=== 2000s and 2010s ===
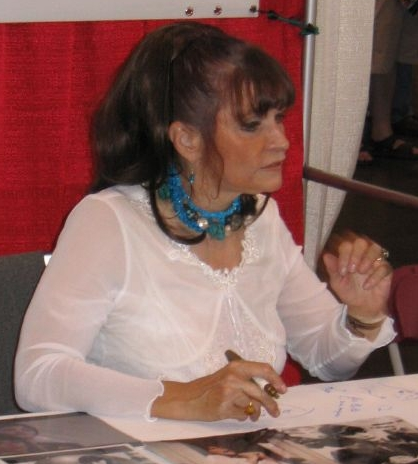
Kidder in Toronto during the Canadian National Exhibition in 2005

In 2000, Kidder played Eileen Canboro in Apocalypse III: Tribulation, a Christian film dealing with Christian eschatology and the rapture. Kidder stated afterwards that she did not realize until she was on the set that the movie was serious. Also that year she appeared in three episodes of Peter Benchley's Amazon, playing a striking role as an insane Canadian woman bent on domination of all the local tribes. In 2001, she played the abusive mother of a murderer in "Pique", an episode of Law & Order: Special Victims Unit. In 2002, she appeared alongside Crispin Glover and Vanessa Redgrave in the film adaptation of Crime and Punishment. Kidder appeared off-Broadway in The Vagina Monologues in December 2002, and toured with the show for two years.

In 2004, Kidder briefly returned to the Superman franchise in two episodes of the television series Smallville, as Bridgette Crosby, an emissary of Dr. Swann's (played by her Superman co-star, Christopher Reeve). After this, she appeared on Robson Arms, a Canadian sitcom set in an apartment block in Vancouver's west end. She played a quirky neighbor of the main cast members. She also had a cameo in Rich Hall's Election Special on BBC Four. In 2006, Kidder played Jenny Schecter's mother Sandy Ziskin on The L Word; her character was a repressed Jewish woman coming to terms with her daughter's sexuality. In 2007, Kidder began appearing on the television series Brothers and Sisters, playing Emily Craft.

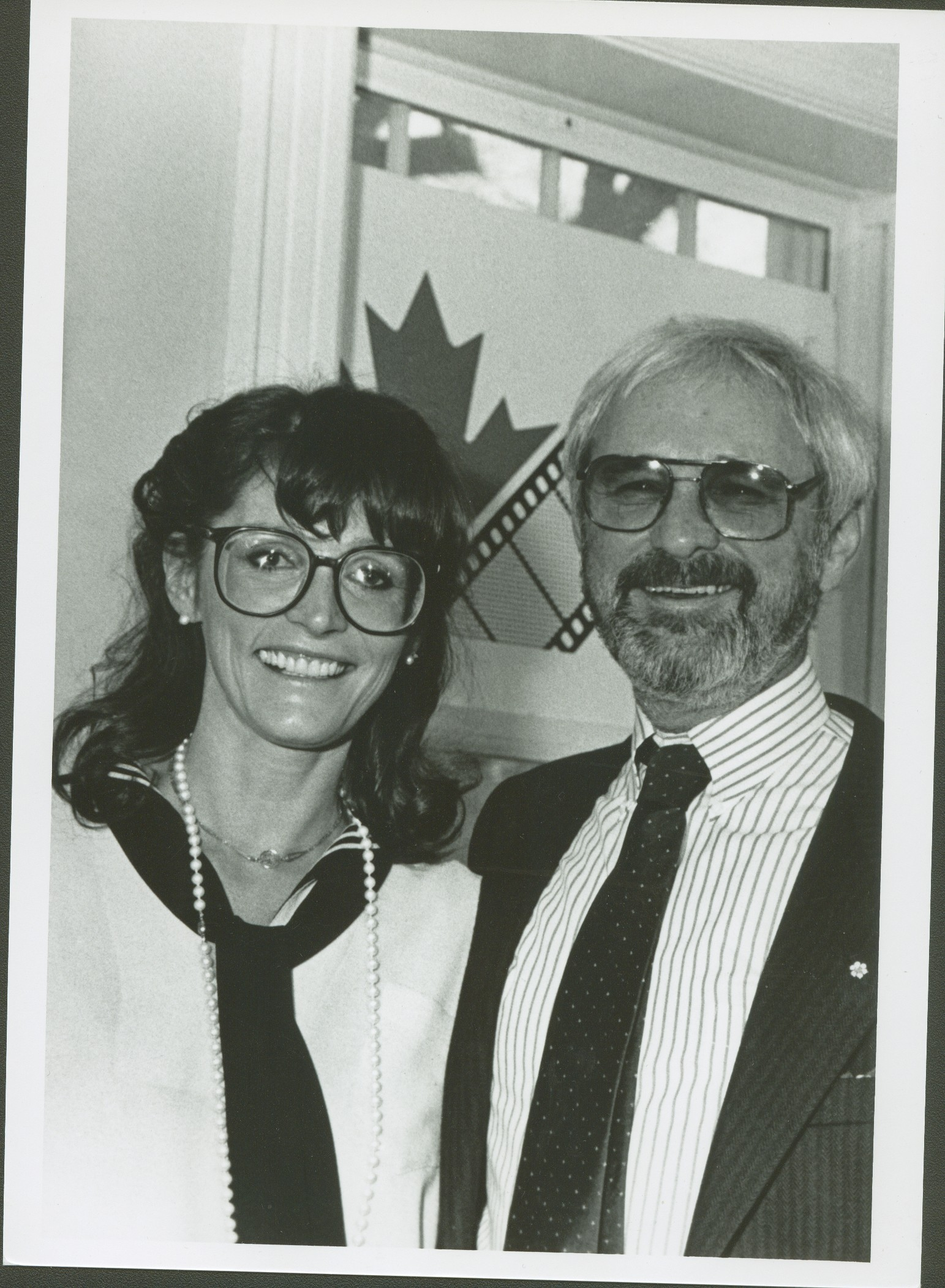
Kidder and Norman Jewison at the Canadian Film Centre in 2008

In 2008, she portrayed an embattled guidance counselor in the gay-themed mystery film On the Other Hand, Death, and a supporting role as Laurie Strode's therapist, in Rob Zombie's Halloween II (2009). In an interview with the LGBT publication The Advocate, Kidder discussed her later career choices: "I'm not choosy at all! I'll do practically anything. I'm the biggest whore on the block. I live in a little town in Montana, and you have to drag me out of here to get to LA, so I'm not readily available. But unless it's something sexist or cruel, I just love to work. I've done all sorts of things, but you just haven't seen them because they're often very bad and shown at four in the morning."

In 2015, Kidder won an Emmy Award for Outstanding Performer in Children's Programming for her performance in R.L. Stine's The Haunting Hour.

She will appear posthumously in the psychological thriller Robber's Roost, directed by Galen Rosenthal, which will be her final film role.

== Other ventures ==
=== Politics ===
Kidder was a longtime supporter of the U.S. Democratic Party and voiced her support for liberal causes throughout her career. She actively supported Jesse Jackson's bid for the Democratic nomination in the 1984 and 1988 United States presidential election. She later endorsed Walter Mondale after he became the Democratic nominee in 1984. In the early 1990s, during the first Gulf War, Kidder was branded a "Baghdad Betty" and subjected to abuse for her remarks questioning the war. In a piece called "Confessions of 'Baghdad Betty'", styled as a letter to her mother and printed in The Nation, Kidder responded by explaining and defending her statements.

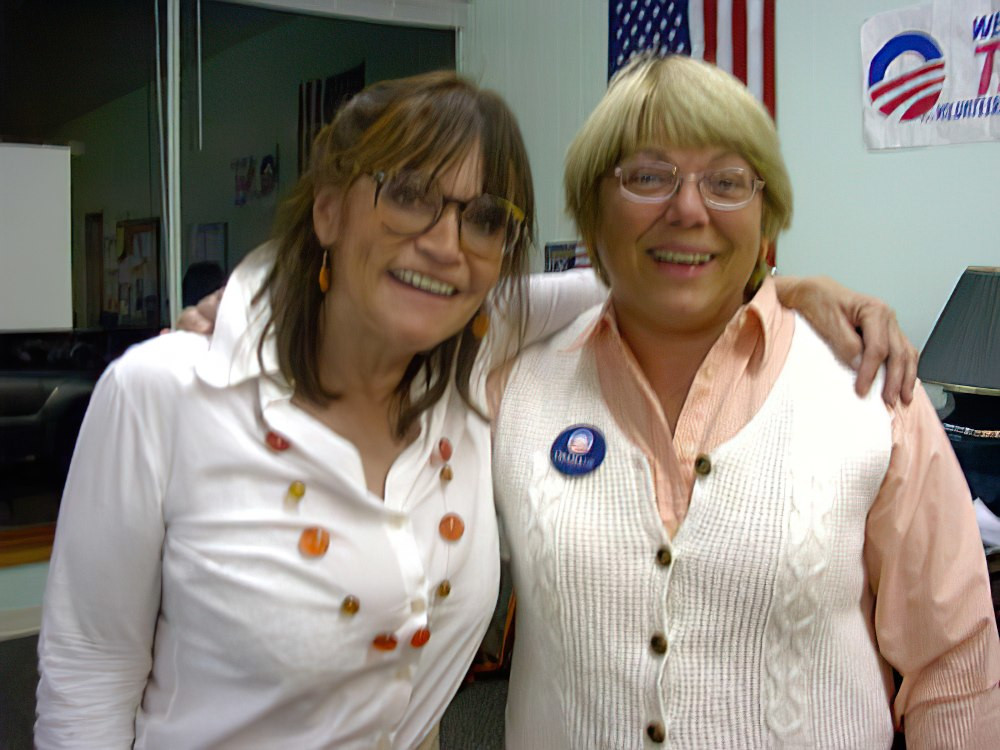
Kidder with Annette Alt at the Barack Obama campaign headquarters in Livingston, Montana in 2008

In 2008, Kidder was a volunteer at the Barack Obama campaign headquarters in Livingston, Montana.

In 2009, Kidder was the Montana State Coordinator for Progressive Democrats of America. The organization's website carried her article "Ax Max", in which she criticized Max Baucus, Montana's Democratic senator. She also contributed articles to CounterPunch, a left-wing magazine, beginning in 2009. On August 22, 2015, she was named the host of a dinner event by the Yellowstone County Democrats in Billings, Montana, called "Billings for Bernie" in support of Bernie Sanders' presidential primary bid. In a CounterPunch article expressing her reaction to the 2016 Democratic National Convention, she wrote, "I am not an American tonight... I reject the words I voiced at my citizenship ceremony."

In addition to her campaigning in the United States, Kidder expressed support for liberal causes in Canada. In 2011, she supported her brother, John Kidder, in British Columbia, who was running to be a member of Canada's Parliament for the Liberal Party:

I'm here not only because John is a dream candidate, but because I'm living in the end game in the United States and it's not funny. Canada is starting the same sort of right-wing, corporate ownership of government, corporate tradeoffs with government, smear campaigns, "let's lower the corporate tax rate without mentioning it's going to up the private tax rates." It's happening in Canada. God forbid if anyone should bring up privatizing health care.

=== Activism ===
Throughout her life, Kidder was active in environmental and anti-nuclear causes. On August 23, 2011, Kidder, Tantoo Cardinal, and dozens of others were arrested while protesting in Washington, DC, against the proposed extension of the Keystone Pipeline. In 2012, she appeared in a video for Stop the Frack Attack, an environmental organization working toward regulating hydraulic fracturing ("fracking") practices. When discussing sustainable energy, Kidder said: "The first thing people have to start facing, contrary to the advertising fed to us by oil and gas companies, is that environmentalism and economic stability go hand-in-hand on any long-term basis." Kidder spent the winter of 2016–2017 residing in a tent at the Standing Rock Reservation in North Dakota, protesting the Dakota Access Pipeline.

In addition to environmental causes, Kidder was a vocal supporter of LGBTQ rights, and in 2003, hosted benefits at a gay and lesbian health center in Boston, Massachusetts.

Following her publicized nervous breakdown in 1996, she also spoke outwardly about her struggles with mental health and her bipolar disorder diagnosis. In 2001, she was awarded the Courage in Mental Health Award from the California Women's Mental Health Policy Council for her public dialogue on mental illness.

== Personal life ==
Kidder became a United States citizen on August 17, 2005, in Butte, Montana, and settled in Livingston. She said that she decided to become an American citizen to participate in the voting process, to continue her protests against U.S. intervention in Iraq, and to be free of worries about being deported.

=== Relationships and marriages ===
While in her late teens, Kidder became pregnant via a boyfriend, who arranged for her to undergo an illegal abortion.

While filming 92 in the Shade, Kidder became romantically involved with Thomas McGuane, and in March 1975, relocated with him to Livingston, Montana. She subsequently became pregnant and gave birth to their only child, a daughter, on October 28, 1975. (Note: In a timeline published in Conversations with Thomas McGuane (2007), Kidder and his daughter is noted as having been born October 28, 1976. This, however, conflicts with a February 9, 1976, article in People, which notes that Kidder was "mothering their out-of-wedlock three-month-old daughter", suggesting her birth year to in fact be 1975.) Kidder and McGuane married on August 2, 1976, but the marriage ended in divorce on July 21, 1977. During the marriage, Kidder stated that her self-esteem had faltered significantly, and she found maintaining a career in film to be difficult while residing in Montana.

On August 25, 1979, she married actor John Heard, but the couple separated only six days into their marriage. Their divorce was finalized on December 26, 1980.

Kidder was romantically linked to Canadian prime minister Pierre Trudeau in the early 1980s.

Kidder married in 1983 French filmmaker Philippe de Broca, who had directed her in Louisiana. Her marriage to de Broca lasted one year, ending in divorce in 1984. Kidder later characterized the marriage as "impulsive, I'm afraid. Not a little irresponsible. We just weren't meant to be married to each other."

=== Personal struggles ===
Kidder received a diagnosis of bipolar disorder in 1988, which she rejected at the time, and refused the recommended lithium treatment.

In 1990, while filming the pilot of a proposed television series Nancy Drew and Daughter, Kidder was in a car crash that injured her spine and left her partially paralyzed. She was unable to work for two years, resulting in debts over $800,000. Kidder attempted to sue the Canadian producer, Nelvana, for $1 million in damages, but did not receive a settlement, and launching the suit rendered her ineligible for Canadian workers' compensation. While convalescing, Kidder said she finally "was able to accept the diagnosis" (of bipolar disorder). She later spoke openly about treatment of her bipolar disorder via alternative medicine.

In 1996, she experienced a manic episode in Los Angeles. At the time, Kidder had been working on an autobiography when her laptop computer became infected with a virus, which caused it to crash and her to lose three years' worth of drafts. Kidder flew to California to have the computer examined by a data-retrieval company that was unable to retrieve the lost files. This prompted her to enter a manic state and she disappeared for four days. She was later found by a homeowner in the backyard of a Glendale residence, and was taken by the Los Angeles Police Department to Olive View–UCLA Medical Center in a distressed state, the caps on her teeth having been knocked out during a rape attempt. She was subsequently placed in psychiatric care. A computer expert was ultimately able to retrieve much of the data that Kidder had lost on her laptop.

In a 2000 interview, Kidder stated that, in addition to causing emotional distress, her manic episodes had led her to experiencing significant financial woes: "I went through millions of dollars—I have no idea how much. I'd buy things for friends, take people to Paris. Once I stayed up for three weeks in a row because I felt like I was called upon to write a new religion for women. I was reading all these books, including the Bible—and I'm an atheist."

== Death ==
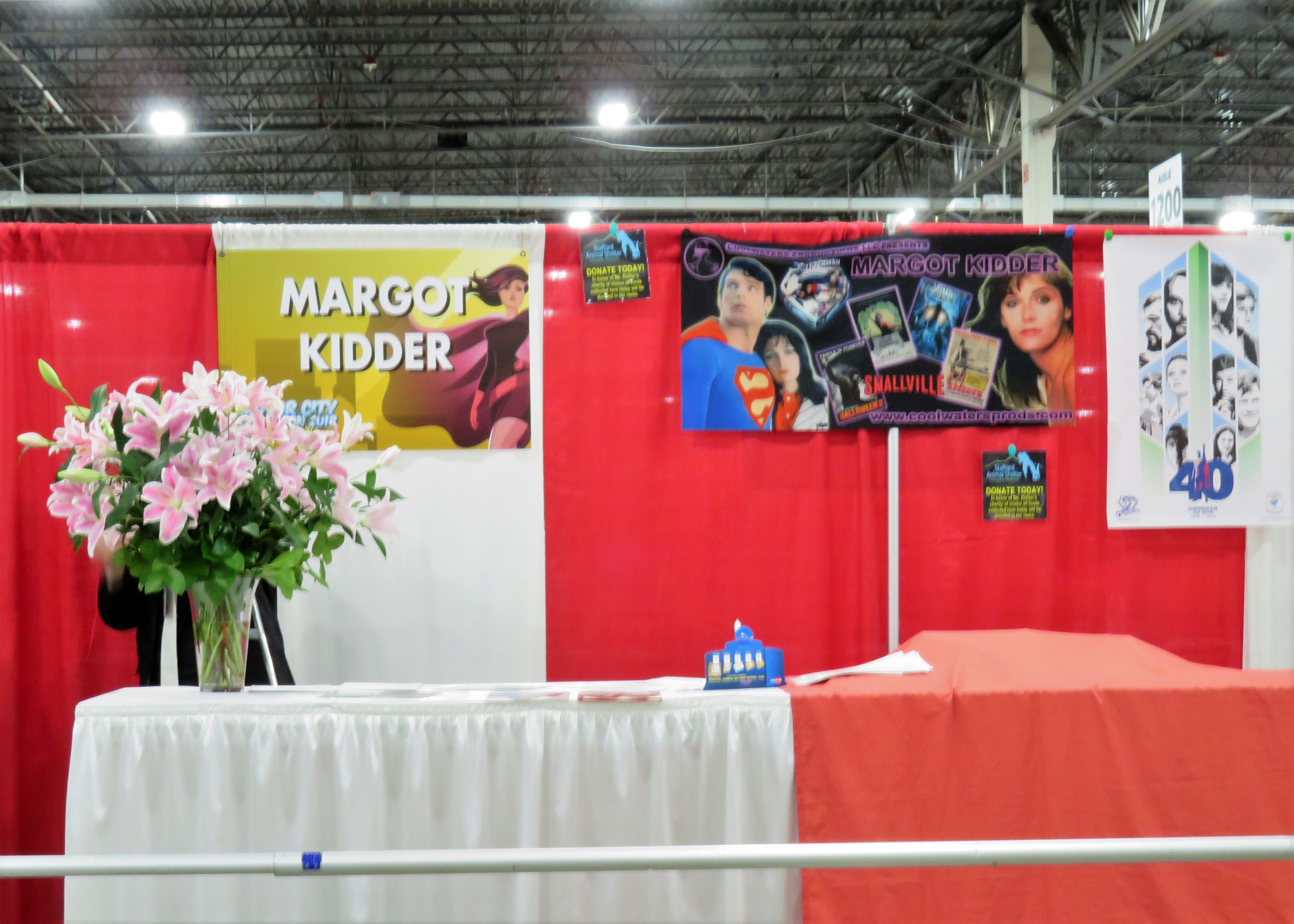
Flowers for Kidder at the Motor City Comic Con in May 2018, where she had been scheduled to appear before her death

Kidder died on May 13, 2018, at her home in Livingston, Montana, at the age of 69. Her death was ruled a suicide by a "self-inflicted drug and alcohol overdose". Kidder had been scheduled to appear at the Motor City Comic Con in Novi, Michigan, later that week.

DC Comics stated on its Twitter feed: "Thank you for being the Lois Lane so many of us grew up with. RIP, Margot Kidder." After her death, director Ted Geoghegan, who knew the actress, stated:

Margot lived at the foot of Canyon Mountain, right outside of Livingston. Like much of Montana, the mountain was filled with wolves. But instead of fearing them, Margot loved them. She left meat out for the wolves so she could watch them come down the mountain and eat from the safety of her home ... She'd asked her closest friends—if they stopped by her place and found her dead—to tell no one, place her naked body in a bedsheet, drag it up Canyon Mountain, and leave her for her other friends, the wolves.

Kidder's body was cremated, and the ashes were scattered by her brother John in her favorite childhood locations in Canada, as well as in Montana, amongst lilies which were frequently eaten by grizzly bears, partially fulfilling Kidder's wish to "have her body just left out there for the bears."

== Filmography ==
Kidder's most acclaimed films, according to the review-aggregation website Rotten Tomatoes, include:

- Quackser Fortune Has a Cousin in the Bronx (1970)
- Sisters (1972)
- Black Christmas (1974)
- A Quiet Day in Belfast (1974)
- The Great Waldo Pepper (1975)
- Superman (1978)
- Superman II (1980)
- Some Kind of Hero (1982)
- The Annihilation of Fish (1999)
- The Hi-Line (1999)

== Awards and nominations ==
Award	Year	Category	Nominated work	Result
Action On Film International Film Festival Awards	2013	Best Supporting Actress	Real Gangsters	Nominated
Action On Film International Film Festival Awards	2016	Outstanding Cast Performance	The Red Maple Leaf	Won
Canadian Film Awards	1969	Best Actress	Herself	Nominated
Canadian Film Awards	1969	Special Award	Herself	Won
Canadian Film Awards	1975	Best Performance by a Lead Actress	A Quiet Day in Belfast and Black Christmas	Won
Daytime Emmy Awards	2015	Outstanding Performer in a Children's or Pre-School Children's Series	The Haunting Hour: The Series (for "Mrs. Worthington")	Won
Fright Meter Awards	2011	Best Actress	Love at First Kill	Nominated
Genie Awards	1982	Best Actress	Heartaches	Won
Online Film & Television Association Awards	1999	Best Guest Actress in a Cable Series	La Femme Nikita	Nominated
Saturn Awards	1979	Best Actress	Superman	Won
Saturn Awards	1980	Best Actress	The Amityville Horror	Nominated
Saturn Awards	1982	Best Actress	Superman II	Nominated

== Sources ==
- Aaker, Everett (2017). Television Western Players, 1960–1975: A Biographical Dictionary. Jefferson, North Carolina: McFarland. ISBN 978-1-476-62856-1.
- Hobson, John Allan; Leonard, Jonathan A. (2001). Out of Its Mind: Psychiatry in Crisis. New York: Basic Books. ISBN 0-7382-0251-7.
- Jewison, Norman (2005). This Terrible Business Has Been Good to Me: An Autobiography. New York: Macmillan. ISBN 978-0-312-32868-9.
- Lerner, Loren Ruth (1997). Canadian Film and Video: A Bibliography and Guide to the Literature. Vol. 1. Toronto, Ontario: University of Toronto Press. ISBN 978-0-802-02988-1.
- McGuane, Thomas (2007). Torrey, Beef (ed.). Conversations with Thomas McGuane. Jackson, Mississippi: University Press of Mississippi. ISBN 978-1-578-06887-6.
- McNeil, Alex (1991). Total Television: A Comprehensive Guide to Programming from 1948 to the Present (3rd ed.). New York: Penguin Books. ISBN 978-0-140-15736-9.
- Muir, John Kenneth (2012). Horror Films of the 1970s. Jefferson, North Carolina: McFarland. ISBN 978-0-786-49156-8.
- Rist, Peter, ed. (2001). Guide to the Cinema(s) of Canada. Westport, Connecticut: Greenwood Publishing Group. ISBN 978-0-313-29931-5.
- Smith, Warren Allen (2002). Celebrities in Hell: A Guide to Hollywood's Atheists, Agnostics, Skeptics, Free Thinkers, and More. New York City, New York: Barricade Books. ISBN 978-1-569-80214-4.
- Wood, Robin (2003). Hollywood from Vietnam to Reagan ... and Beyond. New York: Columbia University Press. ISBN 978-0-231-50757-8.
