= Brian De Palma filmography =

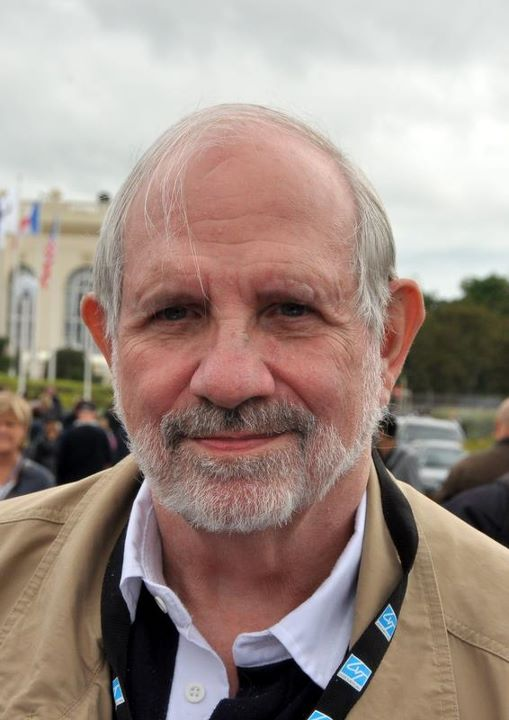
De Palma at the 2011 Deauville American Film Festival

Brian De Palma (born 1940) is an American film director, producer, and screenwriter whose career spans more than fifty years. To date, he has directed thirty feature films, including the horror film Carrie (1976), the crime dramas Scarface (1983), The Untouchables (1987) and Carlito's Way (1993), and the spy thriller Mission: Impossible (1996) as well as cult favorites such as Sisters (1972), Phantom of the Paradise (1974), Dressed to Kill (1980), Blow Out (1981), Body Double (1984), Raising Cain (1992) and Femme Fatale (2002).

== Filmography ==
=== Feature films ===
Year	Title	Director	Writer	Producer	Editor	Notes
1968	Murder a la Mod	Yes	Yes	No	Yes	
1968	Greetings	Yes	Yes	No	Yes	Actor: Man in Front of Draft Office Smoking (Uncredited)
1969	The Wedding Party	Yes	Yes	Yes	Yes	Co-directed with Wilford Leach and Cynthia Munroe
1970	Hi, Mom!	Yes	Yes	No	No	
1970	Dionysus in '69	Yes	No	No	Yes	Co-directed with Robert Fiore and Bruce Joel Rubin; Also Cinematographer
1972	Get to Know Your Rabbit	Yes	No	No	No	
1972	Sisters	Yes	Yes	No	No	
1974	Phantom of the Paradise	Yes	Yes	No	No	
1976	Obsession	Yes	Story	No	No	
1976	Carrie	Yes	No	Uncredited	No	
1978	The Fury	Yes	No	No	No	
1979	Home Movies	Yes	Story	Yes	No	
1980	Dressed to Kill	Yes	Yes	No	No	
1981	Blow Out	Yes	Yes	No	No	
1983	Scarface	Yes	No	No	No	
1984	Body Double	Yes	Yes	Yes	No	
1986	Wise Guys	Yes	No	No	No	
1987	The Untouchables	Yes	No	No	No	
1989	Casualties of War	Yes	No	No	No	
1990	The Bonfire of the Vanities	Yes	No	Yes	No	
1992	Raising Cain	Yes	Yes	No	No	
1993	Carlito's Way	Yes	No	No	No	
1996	Mission: Impossible	Yes	No	No	No	
1998	Snake Eyes	Yes	Story	Yes	No	
2000	Mission to Mars	Yes	No	No	No	
2002	Femme Fatale	Yes	Yes	No	No	
2006	The Black Dahlia	Yes	No	No	No	Actor: Elizabeth's Screen Test Director (Voice Only - Uncredited)
2007	Redacted	Yes	Yes	No	No	
2012	Passion	Yes	Yes	No	No	
2019	Domino	Yes	No	No	No	
TBA	Sweet Vengeance	Yes	Yes	No	No	Pre-production

=== Short films ===
Year	Title	Director	Writer	Editor	DoP	Notes
1960	Icarus	Yes	No	No	No	
1961	660124: The Story of an IBM Card	Yes	No	No	No	
1962	Woton's Wake	Yes	Yes	No	No	Midwest Film Festival 1963
1964	Jennifer	Yes	No	No	No	
1966	The Responsive Eye	Yes	No	Yes	Yes	Documentary shorts
1966	Show Me a Strong Town and I'll Show You a Strong Bank	Yes	No	No	No	Documentary shorts
1969	To Bridge This Gap	Yes	No	No	No	Documentary shorts

=== Music videos ===
Year	Title	Artist
1984	"Dancing in the Dark"	Bruce Springsteen

== Unrealized projects ==
Year	Title and description	Ref.
1970s	A film adaptation of John Guare's one-act play Cop-Out starring Al Pacino	
1970s	Fuzz	(Note: John Lithgow was intended to be cast for a part in De Palma's planned iteration of Fuzz.)
1970s	A film adaptation of Terry Garrity's novel The Sensuous Woman co-written with Louise Lasser and Jeannie Sakol starring William Finley	
1970s	"Shooting Script", an episode of the TV series Columbo co-written with Jay Cocks	
1970s	The Black Bird	
1970s	A film adaptation of Gerald Walker's novel Cruising	
1970s	The Stepford Wives	
1970s	A film adaptation of Alfred Bester's novel The Demolished Man co-written with John Farris	(Note: In 1975, De Palma's oft-collaborator William Finley was attached to have a role in the film.)
1970s	A film adaptation of Mary Higgins Clark's novel Where Are the Children? co-written with John Farris	
1970s	A film adaptation of Robert Stone's novel Dog Soldiers	
1970s	An untitled comedy co-written with Jay Cocks featuring a character that resembles Truman Capote	
1970s	A film adaptation of Robert Daley's novel Prince of the City co-written with David Rabe starring John Travolta	
1980s	Treasure, a contemporary-set film adaptation of B. Traven's novel The Treasure of the Sierra Madre	
1980s	A film adaptation of Trevor Armbrister's novel Act of Vengeance	
1980s	A film adaptation of Michael Crichton's novel Congo	
1980s	Starfire, a science fiction film with Steven Spielberg	
1980s	Fire, a musical drama loosely based on the life of Jim Morrison starring John Travolta	
1980s	Carpool, a thriller written by Robert Zemeckis and Bob Gale described as "Rear Window on wheels"	
1980s	Fatal Attraction	
1980s	A film adaptation of Hubert Selby Jr.'s novel Last Exit to Brooklyn	
1980s	Rapture, a screenplay co-written with Christopher Crowe	
1980s	A remake of the 1951 film Ace in the Hole written by David Mamet	
1990s	A remake of the 1960 film The Magnificent Seven co-written with Daniel Pyne set within the Medellín Cartel	
1990s	The Ghost and the Darkness	
1990s	The Truman Show	
1990s	Ambrose Chapel, a psychological thriller co-written with Jay Cocks starring Brad Pitt, Liam Neeson, Téa Leoni, Martin Sheen and Madonna	
1990s	Blackwater, retitled from The Safe House, a screenplay from a story co-written by De Palma with David Koepp to be directed by Koepp	
1990s	Nazi Gold, an action thriller co-written with Jay Cocks about a plot to steal Nazi bullion starring Richard Dreyfuss	
1990s	Mr. Hughes, a biopic written by David Koepp about Howard Hughes and Clifford Irving starring Nicolas Cage, Warren Beatty, Tia Carrere, Patricia Clarkson and Adam West	
2000s	Confessions of a Dangerous Mind	
2000s	A film adaptation of Gardner McKay's one-act play Toyer starring Juliette Binoche and Colin Firth	
2000s	Tru Blu, a biopic written by Steven Zaillian about drug trafficker Frank Lucas	
2000s	The Untouchables: Capone Rising, a prequel to his film The Untouchables written by Brian Koppelman, David Levien and David Rabe starring Gerard Butler	
2000s	A film adaptation of William Boyd's novel The Blue Afternoon starring Daniel Craig	
2000s	Print the Legend, a film about the process of "selling" the Iraq War to the U.S. homefront	
2000s	Tabloid, a political thriller inspired by Democratic presidential nominee John Edwards	
2000s	A film adaptation of Susan Kelly's novel The Boston Stranglers written by Alan Rosen	
2000s	A remake of the 1951 film noir His Kind of Woman	
2010s	Paranormal Activity 2	
2010s	Parker	
2010s	The Key Man, a "paranoia thriller" written by Joby Harold about a single father whose body contains answers to national secrets	
2010s	Wild Card	
2010s	Paterno, retitled from Happy Valley, a biopic written by David McKenna about Joe Paterno starring Al Pacino and John Carroll Lynch	
2010s	Magic Hour, a loose adaptation of Émile Zola's novel Thérèse Raquin starring Emily Mortimer	
2010s	Retribution, a remake of the 2003 film The Alzheimer Case starring Al Pacino	
2010s	An untitled film to be shot in Canada starring Ashton Kutcher	(Note: While in Rome shooting All Roads Lead to Rome, producer Silvio Muraglia told Askanews that he was developing a movie to be directed by De Palma, and starring Ashton Kutcher. Muraglia said the film would shoot in Canada.)
2010s	Lights Out, an action thriller about a blind Chinese girl written by Lamont Magee and Jeff W. Byrd starring Christina Wu	
2010s	A film adaptation of Sascha Arango's novel The Truth and Other Lies	
2010s	Catch and Kill, retitled from Predator, a horror film inspired by the Harvey Weinstein sexual abuse cases	
2010s	Clarksville 1861, retitled from Newton 1861, a TV remake of the French series Un village français set in Kentucky during the Civil War	
2010s	A remake of the 1998 film noir Palmetto	

De Palma also turned down the opportunities to direct Hurricane, Flashdance, The Sicilian, Schindler's List and Mission: Impossible 2.
