= Cruising (film) =

1980 film by William Friedkin

- Theatrical release poster
- Directed by: William Friedkin
- Screenplay by: William Friedkin
- Based on: Cruising by Gerald Walker
- Produced by: Jerry Weintraub
- Starring: Al Pacino; Paul Sorvino; Karen Allen
- Cinematography: James Contner
- Edited by: Bud Smith
- Music by: Jack Nitzsche
- Production companies: CiP-Europaische Treuhand; Lorimar Film Entertainment
- Distributed by: United Artists
- Release dates: February 15, 1980 (United States); August 25, 1980 (West Germany)
- Running time: 102 minutes
- Countries: West Germany; United States
- Language: English
- Budget: $11 million
- Box office: $19.8 million

Cruising is a 1980 crime thriller written and directed by William Friedkin, and starring Al Pacino, Paul Sorvino and Karen Allen. It is loosely based on the 1970 novel by The New York Times reporter Gerald Walker about a serial killer targeting gay men, particularly the men associated with the leather scene. The title is a double entendre, as "cruising" can describe both police officers on patrol and men who are cruising for sex. It was an international co-production between West Germany and the United States.

Poorly received by critics when released, Cruising performed moderately at the box office. Pacino subsequently called the film "exploitative". The shooting and promotion were dogged by gay rights protesters who believed that the film stigmatized them as a community. The film, including its open-ended finale, polarized critics, but in the decades since its initial release, the film has developed a cult following.

== Plot ==
Amidst a hot summer in New York City, the dismembered body parts of men begin appearing in the Hudson River. Police suspect a serial killer is targeting gay men at West Village bars such as the Eagle's Nest, the Ramrod and the Cock Pit, luring them to cheap hotels, tying them up, and stabbing them to death. Under pressure to solve the case before the Democratic National Convention, NYPD Captain Edelson asks officer Steve Burns to go undercover in the city's gay S&M and leather bar scene to track down the killer, as Burns matches the victims' physical characteristics.

Upon accepting the assignment, Burns uses the pseudonym John Forbes to rent a separate apartment in the Meatpacking District for the operation. He quickly befriends neighbor Ted Bailey, a struggling gay playwright, but overhears the turmoil in Ted's relationship with his overbearing dancer boyfriend Gregory. Burns becomes heavily immersed in the customs of the gay nightlife scene, though the secrecy of the work strains his relationship with his girlfriend Nancy. One night, Burns entices young waiter Skip Lee, who is mistakenly arrested and beaten by police into giving a false confession despite his fingerprints not matching those of the killer's. Disturbed by the gay bashing, Burns considers quitting, but Edelson convinces him to continue by reprimanding the officers involved in Skip's interrogation.

As the killer continues to evade police, Burns pursues a new lead and investigates students at Columbia University who studied under one of the previous victims, a college professor. His suspicions center on Stuart Richards, a graduate music student whom Burns previously encountered at a club. Although Richards appears outwardly ordinary, Burns breaks into his apartment and discovers S&M attire, along with box of disturbing letters addressed to Richards's deceased father hidden in a closet. When Richards later realizes that his apartment has been broken into, he retrieves a knife from his closet matching the one used by the killer.

At night, Burns follows Richards to the park and cruises him for sex. During the encounter, Burns asks Richards to lower his pants, prompting Richards to pull his knife, but before he can strike, Burns incapacitates him by stabbing him in the side. At the hospital, Richards is taken into police custody, where authorities determine that his letters indicate signs of schizophrenia. Although Richards denies being the serial killer, his fingerprints match for those discovered at one of the murder scenes. Edelson thanks Burns for apparently solving the case and promotes him to detective.

Shortly after Richards is arrested, Ted is found brutally stabbed to death in his apartment. Police dismiss the murder as a lover's quarrel turned violent and issue an arrest warrant for Gregory, whose jealousy had previously lead to a bitter confrontation with Burns. Edelson is shocked at the sight of the crime scene and is informed that Ted's neighbor, John Forbes, has disappeared without notice.

Nancy reconciles with Burns at their shared apartment, where he promises to tell her "everything", but after shaving first. As Burns shaves, Nancy tries on his leather jacket, peaked cap, and aviator sunglasses, resembling the outfit worn by the killer. Burns then blankly stares at the mirror.

== Cast ==
- Al Pacino as Detective Steve Burns
- Paul Sorvino as Captain Edelson
- Karen Allen as Nancy Gates
- Richard Cox as Stuart Richards
- Don Scardino as Ted Bailey
- Joe Spinell as Patrolman DiSimone
- Jay Acovone as Skip Lee
- Randy Jurgensen as Detective Lefransky
- Barton Heyman as Dr. Rifkin
- Gene Davis as DaVinci
- Arnaldo Santana as Loren Lukas
- Larry Atlas as Eric Rossman
- Allan Miller as Chief of Detectives
- Sonny Grosso as Detective Blasio
- Edward O'Neill as Detective Schreiber
- Michael Aronin as Detective Davis
- James Remar as Gregory
- William Russ as Paul Gaines
- Mike Starr as Patrolman Desher
- Leo Burmester as Water Sport
- Henry Judd Baker as Tough Cop
- Steve Inwood as Martino
- Keith Prentice as Joey
- Leland Starnes as Jack Richards
- Powers Boothe as Hankie Salesman

== Production ==
Philip D'Antoni, who had produced Friedkin's 1971 film The French Connection, approached Friedkin with the idea of directing a film based on The New York Times reporter Gerald Walker's 1970 novel Cruising, about a serial killer targeting New York City's gay community. Friedkin was not particularly interested in the project. D'Antoni tried to attach Steven Spielberg, but they were not able to interest a studio.

A few years later, Jerry Weintraub brought the idea back to Friedkin, who was still not interested. However, Friedkin changed his mind following a series of unsolved killings in gay leather bars in the 1970s and the articles written about the murders by Village Voice journalist Arthur Bell. Friedkin also knew a police officer named Randy Jurgensen, who had gone into the same sort of deep cover that Pacino's Steve Burns did to investigate an earlier series of gay murders; Paul Bateson, a radiology technician who had appeared in Friedkin's 1973 film The Exorcist, was implicated (but never charged) in six of the leather bar murders, while being prosecuted for another murder. All of these factors gave Friedkin the angle he wanted to pursue in making the film. Jurgensen and Bateson served as film consultants, as did Sonny Grosso, who earlier had consulted with Friedkin on The French Connection. Jurgensen and Grosso appear in bit parts in the film.

In his research, Friedkin worked with members of the Mafia, who at the time owned many of the city's gay bars. Al Pacino was not Friedkin's first choice for the lead; Richard Gere had expressed a strong interest in the part, and Friedkin had opened negotiations with Gere's agent. Gere was Friedkin's choice because he believed that Gere would bring an androgynous quality to the role that Pacino could not.

The film was intended to depict gay cruising as it existed at the Mineshaft, which does appear in the novel. However, that bar is not named in the movie because it would not allow filming. Scenes from the movie were instead filmed at the Hellfire Club, which was decorated to resemble the Mineshaft. Regulars from the Mineshaft also appeared as extras, and scenes were shot in streets and other locations near the Mineshaft. Additionally, Pacino visited the Mineshaft while researching his role.

The Motion Picture Association of America (MPAA) originally gave Cruising an X rating. Friedkin claims that he presented the film to the MPAA board "50 times" at a cost of $50,000 and deleted 40 minutes of footage from the original cut before he secured an R rating. The deleted footage, according to Friedkin, consisted entirely of footage from the clubs, depicting "[a]bsolutely graphic sexuality ... that material showed the most graphic homosexuality with Pacino watching, and with the intimation that he may have been participating".

In some discussions, Friedkin claims that deleting the 40 minutes had no effect on the story nor the characterizations. In others, he states that the footage created "mysterious twists and turns (which [the film] no longer takes)", suggested more clearly that Pacino's character may have become a killer, and simultaneously made the film both more and less ambiguous. When Friedkin sought to restore the missing footage for the film's DVD release, he discovered that United Artists no longer possessed it. He believes that UA destroyed it. Some obscured sexual activity remains visible in the film as released, and Friedkin intercut a few frames of gay pornography into the first scene, in which a murder is depicted.

This movie represents the only film soundtrack work by the punk rock band the Germs. They recorded six songs for the film, of which one, "Lion's Share", appeared. The cut "Shakedown, Breakdown" was written and recorded specially for the film by cult band Rough Trade. Soundtrack director Jack Nitzsche had initially attempted to include two songs—"Endless Night" and "Devil's Sidewalk"—by Graham Parker and the Rumour in the film, but legal issues prevented their inclusion. The songs appeared on Parker's 1980 album The Up Escalator.

Friedkin asked gay author John Rechy, some of whose works are set in the same milieu as the film, to screen Cruising before its release. Rechy had written an essay defending Friedkin's right to make the film, but not defending the overall film. At Rechy's suggestion, Friedkin deleted a scene showing the Gay Liberation slogan "We Are Everywhere" as graffiti on a wall before the first body part is pulled from the river, and added a disclaimer:

This film is not intended as an indictment of the homosexual world. It is set in one small segment of that world, which is not meant to be representative of the whole.

Friedkin later claimed that it was the MPAA and United Artists that required the disclaimer, calling it "part of the dark bargain that was made to get the film released at all" and "a sop to organized gay rights groups". Friedkin claimed that no one involved in making the film thought that it would be considered as representative of the entire gay community, but gay film historian Vito Russo disputes that, citing the disclaimer as "an admission of guilt. What director would make such a statement if he truly believed that his film would not be taken to be representative of the whole?"

Friedkin has said that he was disappointed with Pacino's lack of professionalism during the shoot, claiming that he was often late and did not contribute any ideas to the character or to the film. On the other hand, Pacino has said that Friedkin did not let him know how to interpret the end of the film, saying, "Am I the killer at the end of the picture or have I gone gay? To this day I don't know because Friedkin never told me how to play my final scene." In his autobiography, Friedkin says that a single shot can change the whole plot of a movie when talking about Cruising, implying that the ambiguous ending might not have been planned from the start. However, some elements in the movie do suggest that Burns might be the killer, such as a scene early in the film in which he’s shown wearing the killer's cap, and the fact that Richards does not attack first, and that Burns stabs him. Furthermore, the killer is said to sing a nursery rhyme before he kills, and Burns is the only person who sings one in the movie.

=== Protests ===
Throughout the summer of 1979, members of New York City's gay community protested the film's production. Protests started at the urging of journalist Arthur Bell, whose series of articles on unsolved murders of gay men inspired the film. Gay people were urged to disrupt filming, and gay-owned businesses to bar the filmmakers from their premises. People attempted to interfere with shooting by pointing mirrors from rooftops to ruin lighting for scenes, blasting whistles and air horns near locations, and playing loud music. One thousand protesters marched through the East Village demanding that the city withdraw support for the film. As a result of interference, the movie's audio often had to be overdubbed to remove the noise caused by off-camera protesters.

Al Pacino said that he understood the protests, but insisted that, after reading the screenplay, he never felt that the film was anti-gay. He said that the leather bars were "just a fragment of the gay community, the same way the Mafia is a fragment of Italian-American life" (referring to The Godfather), and that he would "never want to do anything to harm the gay community". However, in 2024, Pacino admitted in his memoir Sonny Boy that he viewed the film as "exploitative" after seeing the finished product. He did not promote the film, and also anonymously donated the money he made from the film to charity.

== Release and reception ==
General Cinema Corporation successfully blind bid to exhibit the film. After previewing the final cut, however, the company executives were so shocked by its content that they refused to release it in their theaters.

Cruising was released February 15, 1980, in the United States, and had a box-office take of $19.8 million.

Critical reaction to the film was mostly negative, and gay activist groups publicly protested Cruising. However, critical opinion has somewhat warmed over the years, as the film has been reassessed.

The film holds a 50% approval rating at Rotten Tomatoes, based on 66 reviews, with a weighted average of 6.1/10. The site's consensus states: "Cruising glides along confidently thanks to filmmaking craft and Al Pacino's committed performance, but this hot button thriller struggles to engage its subject matter sensitively or justify its brutality."

On its original release, Roger Ebert of the Chicago Sun-Times gave Cruising two-and-a-half stars out of four, describing it as well-filmed and suspenseful, but unwilling to reveal the true feelings of Steve Burns about the S&M subculture, which Ebert said frustrates the viewer because the film is much more focused on Burns' immersion into that subculture than it is on his pursuit of the killer.

Critic Jack Sommersby likewise commented that the film frustratingly suggests that Burns is affected by his experiences in the S&M subculture while giving no real indications as to how or why. He additionally criticized the lack of a clear motive for the killer, the exploitive nature of some of the directorial choices, the weakness of Al Pacino's performance, and the generally poor adaptation of the novel.

=== Reception in the LGBTQ+ community ===
Gay activists at the time felt that the film had a homophobic political message, in that it portrayed gay men as being attracted to violence, which could, in turn, justify homophobic hate crimes. Ebert wrote, "The validity of these arguments is questionable", and said he intended to elaborate on this subject in a separate article. Ebert and film historian/LGBT activist Vito Russo both suspected that the reason the film does not clearly answer how Steve Burns is affected by the S&M subsculture or who murdered Ted Bailey is because scenes were removed in response to the gay protests; the protestors believed the film would end with Burns becoming a psychotic killer because of his realization that he was attracted to the world of homosexuality.

TV Guide's Movie Guide commented that the S&M subculture is portrayed "as irredeemably sick and violent", and that almost none of the characters in the film are sympathetic.

Brian Juergens, associate editor with gay culture website AfterEllen, contended that the movie "viciously exploited" the gay community, arguing that gay male sexuality does not seem to serve any purpose in the plot other than being a prop to shock heterosexual audiences. Although the film contains a disclaimer saying that it does not intend to be "an indictment of the homosexual world", Juergens states that certain elements in the plot—especially the fact that it is hinted that several gay male killers are operating simultaneously—"makes a clear statement (however unintended the filmmakers may maintain it is) about a community as a whole".

However, in Exorcising Cruising, a behind-the-scenes documentary on the Cruising DVD, Friedkin claims that the film was supported by much of New York City's leather/S&M community, who appeared by the dozens as extras in the nightclub scenes.

Raymond Murray, editor of Images in the Dark (an encyclopedia of gay and lesbian films), wrote that "the film proves to be an entertaining and (for those born too late to enjoy the sexual excesses of pre-AIDS gay life) fascinating if ridiculous glimpse into gay life—albeit Hollywood's version of gay life". He also says that "the film is now part of queer history and a testament to how a frightened Hollywood treated a disenfranchised minority".

In retrospect, William Friedkin said, "Cruising came out around a time that gay liberation had made enormous strides among the general public. It also came out around the same time that AIDS was given a name. I simply used the background of the S&M world to do a murder mystery; it was based on a real case. But the timing of it was difficult because of what had been happening to gay people. Of course, it was not really set in a gay world; it was the S&M world. But many critics who wrote for gay publications or the underground press felt that the film was not the best foot forward as far as gay liberation was concerned, and they were right. Now it's reevaluated as a film. It could be found wanting as a film, but it no longer has to undergo the stigma of being an anti-gay screed, which it never was."

=== Retrospective ===
In a 2006 interview, social critic Camille Paglia stated, "I loved Cruising—while everyone else was furiously condemning it. It had an underground decadence that wasn't that different from The Story of O or other European high porn of the 1960s."

In a retrospective review from 2025, critic Mike Cormack from PopMatters said, "Cruising is about much more than one subculture: it’s about human identity and performance. We are actors in the dramas of our own lives, it says. As sociologist Erving Goffman argues in The Presentation of Self in Everyday Life (1956), the self is not something we possess but perform; it’s a fragile construct shaped by the stages in which we find ourselves. 'When an individual presents himself before others, his performance will tend to incorporate and exemplify the officially accredited values of the society… He will be required to entrust his self-image to their tender mercies,' writes Goffman... Cruising captures this unsettlingly: not just hidden desires, but the dance of being. Who we are depends on who’s watching and which role we think they’ll accept. So the answer to the question, “Who are you?” is really, “Who’s asking?”

Several film directors cite the movie as among their favorite films. Quentin Tarantino says that when he was doing a play on Broadway in 1995, he held a screening for gay members of the theater community, and "It just blew their minds. They loved it." Danish film director Nicolas Winding Refn called the film "a masterpiece". The Safdie brothers have named the film as an influence on their work.

== Hate crime connections ==
In the 1995 documentary The Celluloid Closet (adapted from Vito Russo's book), Ron Nyswaner, screenwriter for Philadelphia, says that he and a boyfriend were threatened with violence by a group of men who claimed that Cruising was their motivation.

According to a 2013 book by film professor R. Hart Kylo-Patrick, "Two months after the film's release, a bar prominently displayed in the movie came under attack by a man with a submachine gun, killing two patrons and wounding 12 others. Friedkin refused to comment on the attack.", in reference to the West Street Massacre, a homophobic mass shooting targeting the Ramrod gay bar on November 19, 1980 (nine months after the film was released). The New York Times reported on the attack at the time and revisited the incident following the Pulse nightclub shooting, but did not mention Cruising or Friedkin. However, connections between Cruising and the West Street Massacre had been made in 1987 in a retrospective on the movie by Vito Russo.

The brutal 1981 murder of gay Sydney man Gerald Cuthbert following a sexual liaison was linked to the film in contemporary media reports. It was claimed that Cuthbert, who was stabbed more than 60 times, had befriended American sailors and, according to one newspaper article, US sailors were shown Cruising on board a naval vessel docked in Sydney on the night of the murder. Police were unable to confirm this, and the crime has never been solved.

== Accolades ==
Award	Category	Subject	Result
Golden Raspberry Awards	Worst Picture	Jerry Weintraub	Nominated
Golden Raspberry Awards	Worst Director	William Friedkin	Nominated
Golden Raspberry Awards	Worst Screenplay	William Friedkin	Nominated
Satellite Award	Best Classic DVD		Nominated
Stinkers Bad Movie Award	Most Intrusive Musical Score	Jack Nitzsche	Nominated

== Legacy ==
Despite the initial controversy upon release, the film has developed a cult following in the decades since.

=== Mapplethorpe ===
Photographer Robert Mapplethorpe's initial interest in the Black male form was inspired by the interrogation scene in Cruising (in addition to films like Mandingo), in which an unknown black character, wearing only a jockstrap and cowboy hat, enters the interrogation room and slaps the protagonist across the face.

=== Home media ===
A deluxe collector's edition DVD was released in 2007 and 2008 by Warner Home Video. The release is not a director's cut, but does include some scenes that are not seen in the original VHS release, as well as additional visual effects added by Friedkin.

Friedkin did a director's commentary track for the DVD. This version does not have the disclaimer at the beginning stating that Cruising depicts a gay S&M subculture and is not representative of mainstream gay life. The DVD includes two bonus features titled "The History of Cruising" and "Exorcising Cruising", the latter about the controversy that the film provoked during principal photography, and after it was released. A special edition Blu-ray, with a restored print of the film, was released by Arrow on August 20, 2019. It has similar bonus features. In 2025, Arrow Video released the film on 4K Ultra HD Blu-ray, featuring a new restoration of the theatrical version of the film, alongside hours of brand new and previously unseen bonus features.

=== Interior. Leather Bar. ===
In 2013, filmmakers James Franco and Travis Mathews released Interior. Leather Bar., a film in which they appear as filmmakers working on a film that reimagines and attempts to recreate the 40 minutes of deleted and lost footage from Cruising. (The period after "Interior" is a reference to Cruising's shooting script, describing an indoor scene at such a bar.) The film is not actually a recreation of the footage. Instead, it uses a docufiction format to explore the creative and ethical issues arising from the process of trying to film such a project.

=== American Horror Story ===
The eleventh season of American Horror Story, also set in 1980s New York, centers on a murder mystery plot notably similar to the one of Cruising. The second episode includes a direct homage to the film's interrogation scene.

=== Mineshaft: The Cruising Murders ===
Jeffrey Schwarz produced and directed the documentary film Mineshaft: The Cruising Murders, which is about Cruising's controversy and protests. It premiered at the Tribeca Festival in June 2026.

== See also ==
- History of homosexuality in American film
