= Bag murders =

Unsolved serial murders in New York City

Details
- Victims: 6
- Span of crimes: 1975–1977
- Country: United States
- State: New York

The bag murders were a series of murders of six men from 1975 to 1977 in New York City. The nickname originated from the fact that each victim had been dismembered, his remains stuffed in a garbage bag and thrown into the Hudson River. The identities of the victims, as well as their killer, have never been established. The case and the subsequent events surrounding it had a significant impact on the gay community.

== Murders ==
From 1975 to 1977, multiple garbage bags containing human remains were found floating in the Hudson River, which the police determined belonged to six men. While examining the clothing left on the body parts, it was determined that all of them had been bought from leather stores in Greenwich Village, on the west side of Lower Manhattan, a popular gathering place for Gay men due to the abundance of gay bars and similar institutions. Due to these circumstances, it was assumed that all victims had been gay as well. At the same time that the police were investigating the murders, a resident of Greenwich Village named Paul Bateson was arrested in September 1977 for the murder of film reporter Addison Verrill. At his trial, prosecutors brought before the court a witness named Richard Ryan, who claimed that Bateson had told him shortly before Verrill's murder that he had also killed three other men: 29-year-old Ronald Cabeau, 41-year-old Donald McNiven and 53-year-old John Beardsley. Each of them had been stabbed to death at their apartments in Lower Manhattan in early 1973, after having visited gay bars. In addition, Ryan also alleged that Bateson had admitted to killing and dismembering six gay men, whose remains he then dumped in the Hudson River. However, no charges against Bateson were brought in the murders due to lack of evidence, and he was convicted solely of Verrill's murder, receiving a 20-to-life sentence. For the remainder of his prison term, Bateson denied responsibility for the "Bag murders".

== Impact on popular culture ==
During Bateson's 1979 trial, director William Friedkin frequently visited him in the county jail. The pair were acquainted after Bateson had a small role in Friedkin's 1973 film The Exorcist. Following their conversation, Friedkin decided to adapt Gerald Walker's 1970 novel Cruising, taking inspiration from the recent murders to serve as plot elements. The eponymous film was released in 1980, with Al Pacino starring in the main role. Friedkin later claimed that while interviewing Bateson, he got him to partially admit responsibility in the murders, particularly about one gay man whose body he had dismembered, the remains stuffed in a garbage bag and then thrown into the East River.

Later on, journalist and LGBT rights activist Arthur Bell wrote a series of articles relating to the Greenwich Village murders, all of which were published in The Village Voice. In them, Bell cited evidence that homosexuals faced great social stigmas from contemporary society and were thus frequently victimized. According to his research, since the early 1970s, there were numerous murders of gay men in Greenwich Village alone, but approximately just four were officially recorded due to intolerance and disrespect towards the gay community. His articles caused a public outcry in the state, attracting the attention of various human rights organizations and serving as an important step for the gay liberation movement.

The filming process of Cruising was met with "angry demonstrations by segments of the city's homosexual community". Bell stated that the emergence of films in which LGBT characters took center stage contributed to the aggression, intolerance and political repression against the community, and fearing possible additional murders, residents of Greenwich Village turned to then-mayor Ed Koch, requesting that he deny permissions to the film crew to shoot, in order to ease tensions. Koch denied the request, resulting in continued protests in the streets which eventually required law enforcement to intervene.

In 2019, interest in the case was revived following the release of the second season of the psychological crime thriller Mindhunter. The sixth episode briefly covered the Bag murders and Bateson's possible involvement in them.

== See also ==
- List of serial killers in the United States
- List of unsolved murders (1900–1979)
- List of fugitives from justice who disappeared
