= Joanna Simon (mezzo-soprano) =

American singer and journalist (1936–2022)

- Born: Joanna Elizabeth Simon; October 20, 1936; New York City, U.S.
- Died: October 19, 2022 (aged 85); New York City, U.S.
- Occupations: Operatic mezzo-soprano; journalist
- Spouse: Gerald Walker (m. 1976; died 2004)
- Parents: Richard L. Simon (father); Andrea Heinemann Simon (mother)
- Relatives: Lucy Simon (sister); Carly Simon (sister); George T. Simon (uncle); Sally Taylor (niece)

Joanna Elizabeth Simon (October 20, 1936 (Note: While biographical entries on Joanna Simon in AllMusic and Chronology of Western Classical Music, Volume 2 report her date of birth as October 20, 1940, other sources have reported ages which do not match this date. A 1963 concert review of Lucy Simon in The News & Observer reported that her sister Joanna was 26 years old at that time without naming a specific day, month, or year of birth, making her potential year of birth 1936 or 1937. However, a 2016 article in Vanity Fair contradicts both of these dates, saying Joanna Simon was 11 years old in 1950 (again no day, month, or year of birth given), making her potential birth years either 1938 or 1939. At the time of her death in 2022 Deadline reported she was 85 years old and The New York Times stated she was born on October 20, 1936.) – October 19, 2022) was an American mezzo-soprano. The daughter of publisher Richard L. Simon, Joanna was an elder sister of singer and songwriter Carly Simon, singer and musical theatre composer Lucy Simon, and photographer Peter Simon.

As a singer, Simon was known for possessing a distinctively "smoky-voiced mezzo-soprano". She performed regularly in operas and concerts internationally from 1962 through 1986, and thereafter made only periodic performances into the late 1990s. In 1962, she won the regional division of the Metropolitan Opera National Council Auditions and the Marian Anderson Award, also making her opera debut that year at the New York City Opera as Mozart's Cherubino. She created the role of Pantasilea in the world premiere of Alberto Ginastera's Bomarzo in 1967 with the Washington Opera Society (now the Washington National Opera), which brought her international fame, and she recorded the part for CBS Records. In 1972, she performed the title role in the world premiere of Thomas Pasatieri's Black Widow at the Seattle Opera, and in 1975 she performed the role of Pelagia in the world premiere of Robert Starer's The Last Lover at the Caramoor Music Festival.

Simon was the first singer to record the role of Irene in Handel's Tamerlano; singing the part for the opera's first recording in 1970. She also made recordings with several orchestras during her career, including the New York Philharmonic, the Vienna Philharmonic, and the Pittsburgh Symphony Orchestra. In 1984, she was a singer in the recording of her sister Carly's song "Turn of the Tide" which was commissioned by the Democratic Party for use in political campaigning, and she also performed as a backup singer on albums made by both of her sisters. On television she was a featured performer on the very last episode of The Ed Sullivan Show on March 28, 1971. She also was a panelist on What's My Line? (1968) and made appearances on programs hosted by Merv Griffin, Mike Douglas, Dick Cavett, and David Frost.

After mostly retiring from singing professionally in 1986, Simon worked as the arts correspondent for PBS's MacNeil-Lehrer News Hour from 1986 to 1992. She won an Emmy Award for her work with the program. She later worked as a real estate broker in Manhattan with the Fox Residential Group. Married to the novelist Gerald Walker from 1976 until his death in 2004, she was the companion of Walter Cronkite from 2005 until his death in 2009.

== Early life ==
Joanna Elizabeth Simon was born on October 20, 1936, and grew up in the Riverdale, Bronx, section of New York City. Her father, Richard L. Simon, was the co-founder of the Simon & Schuster publishing company. She had two younger sisters, singer Carly Simon and singer-composer Lucy Simon, and a brother, Peter Simon, a photographer. In 1985, the three sisters talked about how they each found a different niche in singing, and for Joanna it was classical music.

Joanna Simon was educated at Riverdale Country School during her youth. As a young adult she studied at Sarah Lawrence College where she graduated with a degree in philosophy in 1962. There, she became interested in musical theatre, and began taking voice lessons with contralto Marion Freschl, the teacher of Shirley Verrett and Marian Anderson, who reoriented her career towards opera.

She pursued further training at the Zurich-based International Opera Studio under the leadership of Herbert Graf and with composer Gian Carlo Menotti at the Spoletto Festival. Her classmates at the International Opera Studio in Zurich included sopranos Dame Gwyneth Jones and Felicia Weathers, and one of her teachers at the institute was Lotfi Mansouri.

== Singing career ==
Simon's first opera appearance was in November 1962 with the New York City Opera in Mozart's The Marriage of Figaro where she played the role of Cherubino. That same year she won both the regional division of the Metropolitan Opera National Council Auditions and the Marian Anderson Award. She competed in the national finals of the Met auditions on March 23, 1962, performing the aria "Che farò senza Euridice" from Gluck's Orfeo ed Euridice on the stage of the Metropolitan Opera House. In 1964 she performed the role of Prince Orlofsky in Die Fledermaus at Lewisohn Stadium with Franz Allers conducting.

In 1965, she was the mezzo-soprano soloist in Beethoven's Symphony No. 9 with the New York Philharmonic, conductor William Steinberg, and tenor Richard Cassilly. That same year she recorded that work for Command Records, this time with Steinberg conducting the Pittsburgh Symphony Orchestra (PSO). She performed with the PSO again in 1967 as a soloist in symphonies by Gustav Mahler which the orchestra performed in Pittsburgh and on tour to New York as part of the International Festival of Visiting Orchestras.

In 1966 Simon was the alto soloist in Beethoven's Mass in C major with the Philadelphia Orchestra under conductor Eugene Ormandy for performances at Carnegie Hall in New York and the Academy of Music in Philadelphia. That same year she recorded Claude Debussy's Le Martyre de saint Sébastien with conductor Leonard Bernstein and the New York Philharmonic, and was one of the three ladies in Mozart's The Magic Flute at the Tanglewood Music Festival with the Boston Symphony Orchestra, conductor Erich Leinsdorf, and Beverly Sills as the Queen of the Night.

In 1967 Simon performed in the world premiere of Argentinian composer Alberto Ginastera's Bomarzo at the Lisner Auditorium in Washington, D.C., for the Washington Opera Society, creating the role of the courtesan Pantasilea. Her performance was widely praised in the press worldwide, and the role brought her a degree of international fame. Variety critic Larry Michie wrote in his review of the production, "Joanna Simon was enormously successful as the courtesan. She sang her seductive aria well, and has a body, very fetchingly displayed, that one can easily imagine a nobleman or anyone else paying for." She later reprised the role of Pantasilea at Lincoln Center when the opera was staged by the New York City Opera in March 1968, and at the Teatro Colón in Buenos Aires in 1972. She also recorded the part for CBS Records in 1968 with conductor Julius Rudel. Also in 1968, Simon portrayed Countess Geschwitz in Alban Berg's Lulu with the American National Opera Company and conductor Sarah Caldwell, made her debut at the Salzburg Festival as Piacere in Rappresentatione di Anima, et di Corpo, and starred in a concert of the music of Lerner and Loewe with the Los Angeles Philharmonic and conductor Roger Wagner at the Hollywood Bowl. Other opera companies she performed leading roles with on the international stage included the Grand Théâtre de Bordeaux.

In 1969, Simon performed the roles of Mehitabel in George Kleinsinger's Archy and Mehitabel and the title role in Ravel's L'enfant et les sortilèges with The Little Orchestra Society. That same year she was the alto soloist in Mozart's Requiem with the Chicago Symphony Orchestra, the alto soloist in Mahler's Symphony No. 2 at the Ravinia Festival, the alto soloist in Bach's St Matthew Passion at the Carmel Bach Festival, and was the soloist in Bernstein's Jeremiah Symphony with the National Symphony Orchestra with the composer conducting. She also collaborated with Bernstein and the New York Philharmonic that year to perform and record excerpts from the role of Brangäne in Wagner's Tristan and Isolde. She concluded the 1968/1969 season portraying the title role in Bizet's Carmen opposite Placido Domingo as Don Jose with the Israel Philharmonic and conductor Zubin Mehta in Tel Aviv.

In 1970 Simon sang the role of Irene for the first recording ever made of Handel's Tamerlano with conductor John Moriarty and the Chamber Orchestra of Copenhagen.

In 1971, she was a soloist with the Naumburg Orchestral Concerts, in the Naumburg Bandshell, Central Park, in the summer series.

In 1972 she was the alto soloist in Mozart's Coronation Mass and Bruckner's Te Deum with the Vienna Philharmonic and conductor Herbert von Karajan at the Salzburg Festival; a performance which was broadcast live on radio internationally. That same year, she sang the role of Juliette in Berlioz's Roméo et Juliette with the Boston Symphony Orchestra and conductor William Steinberg, and she performed at Broadway's Imperial Theatre in a benefit concert for the Museum of the City of New York which was staged in honor of Richard Rodgers' 70th birthday and featured songs of Rodgers and Hammerstein and Rodgers and Hart. She performed the role of Carmen with several companies including the Nevada Opera in 1972 and the Philadelphia Grand Opera Company at the Academy of Music in Philadelphia in 1974. Also in 1972, she created the title role in the world premiere of Thomas Pasatieri's Black Widow at the Seattle Opera for her debut with that company. She performed twice more with the Seattle Opera for performances as Dorabella in Mozart's Così fan tutte (1974) and Charlotte in Massenet's Werther (1976); the latter a co-production with the Portland Opera.

In 1975 Simon portrayed the heroine Pelagia in the world premiere of Robert Starer's The Last Lover at the Caramoor Music Festival. That same year she used the Hunter College playhouse for a recital, which was her first in New York after debuting with the New York City Opera (NYCO) 13 years prior. The month before her recital she broke her hip after tripping on a rug, and had to perform while using crutches to get around. In 1978 she returned to the NYCO to portray Adah in Victor Herbert's Naughty Marietta at Lincoln Center. She continued to appear periodically with the NYCO over the next several years, appearing as Giuletta in The Tales of Hoffmann (1980) and Fenena in Verdi's Nabucco (1981) among other roles.

In 1982 Simon performed as the soloist in Prokofiev's Alexander Nevsky with the American Symphony Orchestra at Carnegie Hall; a concert celebrating the 100th birthday of conductor Leopold Stokowski. In February 1983 she performed works by Richard Wagner, Gustav Mahler, and Richard Strauss with the Brooklyn Philharmonic at the Brooklyn Academy of Music with conductor Lukas Foss; including Mahler's song cycle Kindertotenlieder. In 1984 she performed in her sister Carly Simon's song "Turn of the Tide" which was commissioned by the Democratic Party for use in political campaigning. She had earlier performed background vocals on Carly's album No Secrets (1972) and on her other sister Lucy's album Lucy Simon (1975).

In 1985 Simon was one of several singers from the New York City Opera hired to perform in a concert of the music of Richard Rodgers at Carnegie Hall for a 12 hour long presentation of his music. In 1986 she performed in an evening of chamber music composed by Gary William Friedman at the Off-Broadway Vineyard Theatre for a concert entitled "The Him Nobody Knows". That same year she was a soloist in Stravinsky's Pulcinella at the 92nd Street Y, and starred in Weill's Mahagonny-Songspiel at Carnegie Hall. In 1989 Simon performed a recital at the John F. Kennedy Center for the Performing Arts which was one half of the program for a concert entitled "Strings & Sings" with other half featuring the Manchester String Quartet. In 1999 she returned to the stage to perform in a concert of Weill's music at Weill Recital Hall with soprano Angelina Réaux and baritone Kurt Ollmann.

== Television appearances and work as a journalist ==
In 1968 Simon was a panelist on the television program What's My Line?. On March 16, 1971, she was a presenter at the 13th Annual Grammy Awards. On March 28, 1971, she was a featured performer on the very last episode of The Ed Sullivan Show. That same year she filmed the role of Piacere in Emilio de' Cavalieri's Rappresentatione di Anima, et di Corpo for the Austrian and German public television networks ORF and ZDF. In 1973 she was a guest on the television program Living Easy with Dr. Joyce Brothers, an episode she filmed in 1972. In 1988 she was the co-host of Ovation magazine's televised Classical Awards with flautist James Galway which was produced by Alexander H. Cohen for broadcast on the Arts & Entertainment Network. Her television credits also include an appearance on The Tonight Show and appearances on programs hosted by Merv Griffin, Mike Douglas, Dick Cavett, and David Frost.

From 1986 until 1992 Simon was the arts correspondent with the MacNeil/Lehrer News Hour. In 1990 she had an extended interview with tenor José Carreras about his battle with leukemia. She won an Emmy Award in 1991 for her work on that program creating a documentary about bipolar disorder and creativity. Some of the other people she interviewed for the MacNeil/Lehrer News Hour including neurologist Oliver Sacks and playwright Marsha Norman. The latter interview proved to be fortuitous for her sister Lucy, as Norman indicated that she was looking for a composer to create a musical adaptation of Frances Hodgson Burnett's 1911 children's novel The Secret Garden. After the interview, Joanna connected Norman with her sister Lucy who went on to write the music for Norman's stage version of the novel. The result of that collaboration was the 1991 Tony Award-winning musical The Secret Garden.

== Personal life ==
In 1975, Simon joined several prominent artists in signing a protest against UNESCO's anti-Israel resolutions and participated in protests organized by Leonard Bernstein. On December 4, 1976, Joanna Simon married Gerald Walker, an articles editor for The New York Times Magazine and author of the book Cruising. They remained married until Walker's death in 2004. Simon met Walter Cronkite when she sold him an apartment, and they dated from 2005 to 2009, which was soon after the death of Cronkite's wife Betsy. While she did not receive anything from Cronkite's estate, which Cronkite did out of respect for his late wife, in 2010 she served as the real estate agent for the sale of his apartments.

== Later life ==
In 1996, Simon took the New York State exam to be a real estate broker. As late as 2012 she was the vice president of the Fox Residential Group (FRG). As of 2014, she was an associate broker with the FRG.

Simon died from thyroid cancer in Manhattan on October 19, 2022, the day before her 86th birthday Her younger sister Lucy died of breast cancer the following day.
