= Paul Bateson =

American convicted murderer (1940–2012)

Paul F. Bateson
- Bateson in The Exorcist, 1973
- Born: Paul F. Bateson; August 24, 1940; Lansdale, Pennsylvania, U.S.
- Died: September 15, 2012 (aged 72); New York City, U.S.
- Other names: Johnny Johnson; The Bag Murderer
- Occupation: Radiological technologist
- Employer: New York University Medical Center
- Known for: Appearance in The Exorcist; murder of magazine journalist Addison Verrill and suspicion of contemporaneous serial killings
- Criminal charge: Second-degree murder
- Criminal penalty: 20 years to life
- Criminal status: Released on parole after 24 years and three months; released from parole after five years

Paul F. Bateson (August 24, 1940 – September 15, 2012), was an American convicted murderer and radiographer. He appeared as a radiologic technologist in a scene from the horror film The Exorcist (1973), which was inspired when the film's director, William Friedkin, watched him perform a cerebral angiography the previous year. The scene, with a considerable amount of blood onscreen, was, for many viewers, the film's most disturbing scene; medical professionals have praised it for its realism.

In 1979, Bateson was convicted of the murder of film industry journalist Addison Verrill and sentenced to a minimum of twenty years in prison; in 2003 he was released on parole, which ended after five years. Prior to his trial, police and prosecutors implicated Bateson in a series of unsolved slayings of gay men in Manhattan known as the "bag murders," killings he had reportedly boasted about while in jail, with prosecutors bringing it up at his sentencing. However, no additional charges were ever brought against Bateson in the killings. The experience inspired Friedkin to make the film Cruising (1980) which, while based on a novel written a decade earlier, incorporated in its storyline the city's leather subculture, with which Bateson had identified.

In 2012, Friedkin recalled having visited the jailed Bateson prior to his trial and having a conversation which suggested that either Bateson had committed the additional "bag murders" or merely that he was considering confessing to them in exchange for a lighter sentence. However, other than the alleged comments made during the Friedkin interview and the assertions by police and prosecutors immediately prior to and during Bateson's trial that he had admitted to the serial murders while in jail, there is no other record of definitive incriminating evidence that he committed the "bag murders," though he remains the most consistently proposed suspect. Despite the lack of conclusive evidence, Bateson is often described as a serial killer.

== Early life ==
Paul Bateson was born on August 24, 1940, and grew up in Lansdale, Pennsylvania, the son of a metallurgist. He would later suggest that his appearance in The Exorcist (1973) was revenge on his father for punishing him as a child by making him stay home from Saturday matinées at the local movie theater and listen to opera on the radio instead. Bateson served in the United States Army in the early 1960s, where he began drinking heavily out of boredom while stationed in West Germany, beginning a lifetime struggle with alcoholism. After his discharge, he returned to Lansdale and stopped drinking for a time.

In 1964, Bateson moved to New York City and began a relationship with a man (he would later describe himself as "not exclusively gay") whom he said was "involved in music." The relationship was marked by heavy drinking, either in the form of cocktails at The Pierre and frequent parties at the couple's home, or weekends in the Fire Island enclave of Cherry Grove—‌both with food cooked by Bateson. Five years later, Bateson's mother died of a stroke and his younger brother died by suicide.

=== Neurological technologist career ===
Bateson trained as a neurological radiological technologist and began working in that capacity. After his romantic relationship ended in 1973, Bateson moved to the Brooklyn neighborhood of Borough Park. From there he commuted to his job at New York University Medical Center (NYUMC), where he was well-liked and respected by his colleagues.

=== The Exorcist ===
In late 1972, film director William Friedkin visited NYUMC while he was preparing to make The Exorcist, the film adaptation of William Peter Blatty's novel of that name. Friedkin wanted to view some medical procedures since he was considering showing some in the film. He was also looking for staff who might be willing to appear as extras in the film, since he would be shooting interiors in New York although the film itself is set in Washington, D.C. Dr. Barton Lane invited the director to observe a cerebral angiography.

At the time, such angiographies were performed by puncturing the patient's carotid artery (in the front of the neck) in order to insert a catheter through which a contrast agent was injected in order to make the patient's blood vessels more visible under X-rays. In the moments between the arterial puncture and the insertion of the catheter, blood freely issued from the tube mouth in rhythm with the patient's heartbeat. Friedkin was sufficiently impressed that he told Lane immediately afterward that not only did he want to depict the procedure in his film, he wanted Lane to be the one performing it on camera, along with the nurse and Bateson, the technician, who, recalled Lane in 2018, was the best he had ever had.

A few months later, Friedkin and his crew returned to NYUMC to shoot the scene, blocking off part of the hospital's radiology department for two successive weekends. It was one of the first scenes shot during principal photography, in which the character of Regan (Linda Blair) is examined medically to see if any of the strange behavior (later found to be the result of demonic possession) she has been exhibiting can be scientifically explained. Lane later recalled hearing that the crew was still trying to figure out how to make Regan's head spin for a scene later on in the film that, like the angiography scene, became one of the film's best-remembered moments.

In the angiography scene, it is Bateson who speaks most of the dialogue, demonstrating the calming bedside manner; this was another attribute that drew praise from those he worked alongside, that he had used with many actual child patients. Bateson can be seen in the background early, as Regan is wheeled into the room, helping put her on the table and attaching wires to her shoulders. As the film shows Regan's face in tight closeup, alternating with takes of the procedure being finished, including her blood spurting into the air and staining her surgical gown as it had in the procedure Friedkin watched, Bateson's voice is heard off-camera, warning her that the carotid puncture will hurt and reassuring her as she winces immediately afterward.

Upon The Exorcist's release at the end of 1973, the angiography scene became notorious as the one that audiences found most disturbing, despite its lack of any of the supernatural content that underlies the rest of the film's horror elements. Medical professionals, including Lane and the others involved in the scene, have also praised it as a realistic depiction of the procedure, of special historic interest since it is no longer performed with a carotid puncture, and one of the most realistic depictions of any medical procedure in a popular film.

== 1974–1979 ==
=== Downward spiral ===
Around the time The Exorcist was released, Bateson's drinking again increased, adversely affecting his social life. "Nobody likes a drunk," he later told The Village Voice. In 1975 it affected his job performance, and NYUMC let him go.

Bateson sustained himself with odd jobs, such as doing light repair work and cleaning in apartments near where he now lived in Greenwich Village, and taking tickets at a theater showing pornographic films. He also went to Alcoholics Anonymous meetings and was temporarily successful in staying sober. He socialized with other recovering alcoholic gay men and was hoping to start another long-term relationship.

However, by 1977 Bateson had begun drinking again, this time even more heavily. He said later that he was drinking at least a quart (0.95 L) of vodka a day, which made him passive and again curtailed his social life. "After a few shots, I'd shave and get dressed," intending to go out. But then after the vodka, "[I] had no energy left to move". On those nights when he was able to go out, Bateson patronized leather bars, something he had started doing back in 1970 with a group that styled themselves as bikers. "Leather impresses me," he said later, contrasting it with drag and swish. "They give gays a bad name, like any extreme group would."

=== Murder of Addison Verrill ===
On September 14, 1977, Addison Verrill, a reporter who covered the film industry for Variety magazine, was found dead in his Horatio Street apartment. Verrill had been beaten and stabbed; there were some signs of a struggle. However, nothing of value had been taken. Police believed that if the killer's motive had been robbery, he might have been looking for cash or jewelry since those could be taken quickly.

There was no evidence of forced entry. Verrill had likely let his killer in to the apartment; there were several empty beer cans and half-full liquor glasses at the scene. Gay rights activist and journalist Arthur Bell, a friend of Verrill's, wrote an article about the case in The Village Voice, setting it against the larger issue of how murders of gay men, several of which occurred yearly Greenwich Village, were rarely taken seriously by police or reported on in the media since they were seen as the results of sexual encounters gone wrong. The police, Bell wrote, had learned that Verrill had been at the Mineshaft, a popular leather bar, until 6 a.m., talking to many other patrons.

According to Bell, Verrill's friends said that while he did not seek the kink that was abundant at the Mineshaft, he nevertheless "liked the attitudes" of many of the customers. He was considered a regular, holding court at a corner table, not only at the Mineshaft but The Anvil, another popular leather bar, and other popular gay bars of the era. Verrill's presence was seen as making those bars popular.

==== Phone calls and confession ====
Bell ended his article by giving the phone number of the New York Police Department's homicide bureau and asking anyone with information to contact them. However, eight days after the killing, someone instead called Bell claiming to be the killer, apparently to correct his assumption that the killer was a psychopath who targeted gays. "I like your story and I like your writing," the caller told him, "but I'm not a psychopath."

In a story that ran on the Voice's front page, the caller recounted the events of the night that ended in Verrill's murder. "I'm gay and I needed money and I'm an alcoholic," he said. After three months of sobriety, he claimed, he had gone out to Badlands, a Christopher Street bar, in the early hours of September 14 where Verrill, whom he did not know, offered to buy him a beer, a proposition the caller accepted. That beer became several, with the two consuming poppers and cocaine in addition to the drinks.

At 3 a.m., the pair left Badlands and went to the Mineshaft, where they continued their alcohol and drug consumption. The caller told Bell he was impressed by how popular his companion was: "I didn't realize he was such a superstar, and I wanted to go home with him." After two hours, they took a taxi to Verrill's apartment, something the caller said Verrill was reluctant to do because he had to get up early the next morning to work on a story.

At Verrill's apartment the two consumed more alcohol and cocaine, followed by sex at 7:30 a.m. The caller said that afterwards he realized that was as far as Verrill had wanted the relationship to go. "I needed money and I hated the rejection," so, still intoxicated, "I decided to do something I'd never done before." After incapacitating Verrill with a frying pan from his kitchen, the caller recounted, he stabbed the journalist with a knife, although he said he chose the wrong part of his chest.

After the killing, the caller said, he stole $57 ($303 in modern dollars) in cash and Verrill's Master Charge card, passport and some clothes. He used the money to buy liquor and was consequently drunk for the entire next day. Bell confirmed with another source that the man had been seen at a popular bathhouse that night.

The caller offered some information about himself relevant to understanding the crime. He claimed to be the son of an orchestra leader, to have a wife in Berlin who did not understand his homosexuality and a teenage son. He had an interest in the arts and had wanted to be a dancer when he was younger.

Bell noted that he talked about wanting to "atone" for his crime several times, which he connected to the conversation taking place on Yom Kippur, the Jewish day of atonement. "[B]ut I don't want to give myself up. I wouldn't be able to practice again. I'd lose my license." The caller declined to tell Bell what sort of practice the license was for, suggesting that would help identify him.

When Bell contacted police about the call, they told him that it seemed like the first solid lead in the case. The caller had known about the stolen credit card, a detail police had not made public, and described a white substance found on the floor of Verrill's apartment as Crisco, a shortening frequently used at the time by gay men as a sexual lubricant. Police had not thus far been able to identify the substance and had also not made the information public.

Detectives suspected the caller would contact Bell again, and went to his apartment to wait with him. At 11 p.m. his phone rang; it was not the original caller but a man who identified himself as "Mitch." He told Bell the killer was Paul Bateson, whom he had gotten to know while the two were drying out at St. Vincent's Hospital a few months earlier. While he believed Bateson was not the man's real name, since he knew the man to have used the pseudonym "Johnny Johnson" at one point, he said Bateson was an unemployed X-ray technician and had called him earlier to confess to the murder.

==== Arrest ====
Mitch asked to meet Bell in person, but the police told Bell not to do so. Instead, they just arrested Bateson at his East 12th Street apartment, where he was lying in a drunken stupor; when he was asked if he knew why he was being arrested, he pointed to an open copy of the Voice with Bell's article and indicated that that was probably why. A detective went to the bar and brought Mitch in for questioning as well; he was released after a few hours. Bateson eventually gave police a handwritten confession that was consistent with what he had told Bell.

==== Jailhouse conversations ====
Bateson was charged with second-degree murder and detained while awaiting trial. Bell interviewed Bateson in person a month later, visiting him at Rikers Island. Bateson talked generally about his life, something he said he did often (as did other acquaintances of Bateson whom Bell spoke with). Jail, he said, was helping him to regain his sobriety; his biggest regret about being in custody was missing the new season of the Joffrey Ballet, at the time based in New York. Bell admitted that he, too, might have taken Bateson up on an offer to go to his apartment if he had met him in a bar rather than jail.

While Bateson avoided talking about the crime he was charged with (on what Bell supposed to be advice from his attorney), he did talk about the trial. He had pleaded not guilty and expected that to be the verdict after a long trial. "A lot of people will be hurt — parents, friends [...] Then, I'll tear up my roots and settle somewhere else."

==== Suspicion in serial killings ====
At the time of Bateson's arrest, police had also been investigating a series of murders of gay men over the previous two years which they believed were committed by the same person due to similarities in the killings' modus operandi. Six corpses of men had been found, dismembered, in bags floating in the Hudson River. None of these bodies have ever been identified, but police traced the clothes on them to shops in Greenwich Village that catered to the gay community. Since the bags reportedly had wording on them connecting them to NYUMC's neuropsychiatric unit, and the dismemberment of the bodies appeared to have been done by someone skilled in using a knife, investigators began to suggest publicly that Bateson might be a suspect in, as they were referred to officially, the "CUPPI" killings (for "Circumstances Unknown Pending Police Investigation") as well.

The killings were the subject of another interview Bateson gave, although it would not be made public until 2012. Friedkin, who recalled Bateson from both his initial visit to NYUMC and the filming of the angiography for The Exorcist as a "nice young man" who stood out due to an earring and studded bracelet he wore, neither of which were common accessories for men at the time, read a long story about the case in the New York Daily News. Surprised that the seemingly gentle Bateson could have even been accused of murder, Friedkin came to Rikers to talk with him after getting permission from Bateson's lawyer.

In an interview with Mubi's The Notebook, which coincided with the release of his film Killer Joe (2011), Friedkin said Bateson admitted to killing Verrill, although the director then incorrectly stated that Bateson had dismembered the body and thrown the bagged body parts in the river. Bateson told Friedkin that prosecutors were offering him a plea bargain whereby if he confessed to the bag murders and other unsolved killings, he would receive a shortened sentence. Bateson claimed he was not sure if he would accept the deal. In a 2018 episode of The Hollywood Reporter's "It Happened in Hollywood" podcast, Friedkin attributed to Bateson a confession to the unsolved murders.

As a result of his conversation with Bateson, Friedkin decided it was time to make film adaptation of New York Times reporter Gerald Walker's 1970 novel Cruising, about a police officer going undercover in the gay community to catch a serial killer. Life had already imitated art, with an NYPD officer, Randy Jurgenson, going undercover in gay bars since he was similar in appearance to the victims of the bag killer. Intrigued by the leather subculture Bateson had told him about, Friedkin met with Matthew Ianniello, the mafioso who owned the Mineshaft and other Manhattan gay bars of the era, and was able to visit the Mineshaft himself. He later added scenes set at the Mineshaft to his film, released in 1980 to mixed reviews after heavy protests by the city's gay community during production.

==== Trial ====
In pretrial motions, Bateson, through his attorney, attempted to have his confession suppressed. He argued that he had been drunk at the time, and that police had not yet read him his rights. Bateson also denied having made the phone call to Bell, claiming his purported confession was just based on what he had read about the case in the Voice.

Bateson went on trial in early 1979. The state entered both his confession and Bell's Voice article into evidence against him. Contrary to his prediction of a long trial in the wake of his arrest, Bateson was convicted after just four days, on March 5, 1979. At his sentencing a month later, prosecutor William Hoyt called Bateson a "psychopath" and reiterated his belief that he was responsible for the six unsolved murders. While Hoyt admitted there was "no direct proof" of this, he said that Bateson had confessed to those crimes in a conversation with Richard Ryan, a friend who had testified for the state at the trial that Bateson had confessed to committing the Verrill murder. Speaking for himself, Bateson denied any role in the other murders.

Justice Morris Goldman sentenced Bateson to twenty years to life in prison, five years less than the minimum Hoyt had asked for. He ultimately found the connection to the other murders "too ephemeral" to merit any consideration in sentencing Bateson. In a 2018 Esquire magazine article about Bateson, writer Matt Miller was unable to find what that evidence might have been as the New York County court clerk's office could not find a copy of the trial transcript. Nothing Miller had been able to review mentioned either the bags purportedly being traced to NYUMC or any mention of a deal offered to Bateson if he confessed to the bag murders.

== Later life ==
=== Prison term and release ===
Bateson ultimately served twenty-four years and three months of his sentence, becoming eligible for parole in 1997. On the day after his 63rd birthday, in August 2003, he was released from Arthur Kill Correctional Facility on Staten Island. According to online records kept by New York State's Department of Corrections and Community Supervision, his parole was successfully completed in November 2008.

Journalist Matt Miller attempted to contact Bateson for his Esquire article in 2018 at his last known address, in the Long Island village of Freeport, but was unsuccessful as the phone had been disconnected; emails to different addresses either bounced or were not answered. The Department of Corrections and Community Supervision also did not have any record of Bateson's death. In his podcast interview around the same time, Friedkin said he had heard Bateson was living somewhere in upstate New York. A record in the Social Security Death Index shows that a Paul F. Bateson, with the same birthdate and a Social Security number issued in Pennsylvania, died in New York City on September 15, 2012, at the age of 72.

== Media portrayals ==
Bateson was portrayed by Morgan Kelly in the second season of the Netflix series Mindhunter.

== See also ==
- Crime in New York City
