= Gitta Steiner =

American composer

Gitta Hana Steiner (April 17, 1932 – January 1, 1990) was a Czech-American composer and pianist who is best known for her works for percussion instruments.

Steiner was born in Prague to Erna Bondy and Erhard (Eric) Steiner. The family moved to New York in 1940, and became U.S. citizens in 1941. Steiner earned a B. Mus. and M.S. from the Juilliard School, where she received the Abraham Ellstein Scholarship. She was a fellow at the Tanglewood Music Center in 1967. Her teachers included Elliott Carter, Vincent Persichetti, and Gunther Schuller. She taught piano and theory privately and at the Brooklyn Conservatory of Music.

Steiner received awards and honors which included the 1972 American Society of Composers and Publishers (ASCAP) Award, the Donell Library Composer’s Forum Honor, the Gretchaninoff Memorial Prize, and the Marion Freschl Award. Her music was published by Seesaw Music Corporation (today Subito Music Corporation).

She wrote the text for many of her works, but also set music to text by Emily Dickinson and James Joyce.
