= Arthur Bell (journalist) =

American journalist, author, and activist (1939–1984)

- Born: November 6, 1939
- Died: June 2, 1984 (aged 44)
- Occupations: Journalist, activist, author

Arthur Bell (November 6, 1939 – June 2, 1984) was an American journalist, author and LGBT rights activist.

== Early life ==
Bell was born in Brooklyn to Samuel Bell, a manufacturer of children's clothing, and, Claire Bodan Bell, a designer. When Bell was in junior high school the family moved to Montreal. Bell returned to New York City in 1960 and found a job writing jacket copy for children's books. He soon became director of publicity for children's books at Viking Press, later leaving Viking Press to work at Random House. An early member of the Gay Liberation Front and a founding member of the Gay Activists Alliance in New York City, wrote two books. Dancing the Gay Lib Blues was published in 1971 and he published Kings Don't Mean a Thing in 1978.

== Journalism ==
In early 1970, Bell published several pieces under the pseudonym "Arthur Irving" (Irving being his middle name) in the New York City-based newspaper Gay Power. After the first Christopher Street Liberation Day, which celebrated the previous year's Stonewall riots, Bell began to write under his surname. On August 13, 1970, the Village Voice published Bell's debut article, "Gay Is Political and Democrats Agree," marking the start of his career as a Voice journalist. He also worked for a time for The Emerald City on Channel J.

After Variety reporter Addison Verrill, an acquaintance of Bell's, was killed in his apartment in 1977, Bell wrote about the case in the Voice. In response he received a telephone call from someone claiming to have been the killer who, while generally appreciative of the piece, objected to being characterized as a "psychopath". The caller left some clues to his identity, and after Bell informed the police, they went to his apartment to wait in case the caller called again. A second caller identified the first to Bell as Paul Bateson, and police went to Bateson's apartment in Greenwich Village and arrested him. Bateson was later convicted of second-degree murder and served almost a quarter-century in prison.

In connection with the case, Bell wrote a series of columns about a string of unsolved murders of gay men; these columns, along with the novel Cruising by Gerald Walker, were the inspiration behind the William Friedkin film Cruising. Bell wrote additional columns condemning Friedkin and Cruising after reading a leaked early screenplay, deploring what he viewed as its negative depiction of gay people and claiming that it would inspire violence against homosexuals. At Bell's urging, gay activists disrupted the filming of Cruising and demonstrated at theatres where the film was playing.

== Personal life ==
Bell met author Arthur Evans, at the time a film distributor, and the two entered into a relationship in 1964. They parted on bad terms in 1971, and Bell included an unflattering portrait of Evans in his book Dancing the Gay Lib Blues. The two reconstructed their friendship and Bell dedicated his second book Kings Don't Mean a Thing to Evans.

== Death ==
Bell died June 2, 1984, at the age of 44 from complications related to diabetes. His last conversations were preserved by publisher Charles Ortleb of the New York Native.

== Legacy ==
Playwright Doric Wilson based a character in his play The West Street Gang on Bell.

== Archival Resources ==
- Arthur Bell papers, 1966-1984, held by the Billy Rose Theatre Division, New York Public Library for the Performing Arts
- Arthur Bell Papers, 1970-1978, held by the Manuscripts and Archives Division, New York Public Library
