= Peter Simon (photojournalist) =

American photojournalist and writer (1947 - 2018)

- Born: May 18, 1947; New York City, New York, U.S.
- Died: November 18, 2018 (aged 71)
- Parent: Richard L. Simon

Peter Hill Simon (May 18, 1947 – November 18, 2018) was an American photojournalist and writer who chronicled U.S. counterculture in the late 1960s and 1970s, the rise of reggae, and everyday life on Martha's Vineyard.

== Biography ==
Peter Hill Simon was born in New York City to publisher Richard L. Simon, co-founder of Simon & Schuster, and civil rights activist Andrea Simon. He attended Boston University's College of Communication, where he completed a B.S. in photojournalism.

Simon cut his teeth covering anti-Vietnam demonstrations and rock concerts for underground weeklies; his pictures of the 1969 Moratorium against the war were syndicated by The Boston Globe and The New York Times. In 1973 he moved to Martha's Vineyard but kept one foot in the music world, touring with the Grateful Dead and photographing Bob Marley, Carly Simon, and Jerry Garcia. His first major book, Reggae Bloodlines: In Search of the Music and Culture of Jamaica, brought him national attention for its blend of reportage and portraiture. Later, he also worked on four-volume On the Vineyard series (1989–2009) and the 2017 retrospective Martha's Vineyard: To Everything There Is a Season.
