= Camilla Williams =

American opera singer (1919–2012)

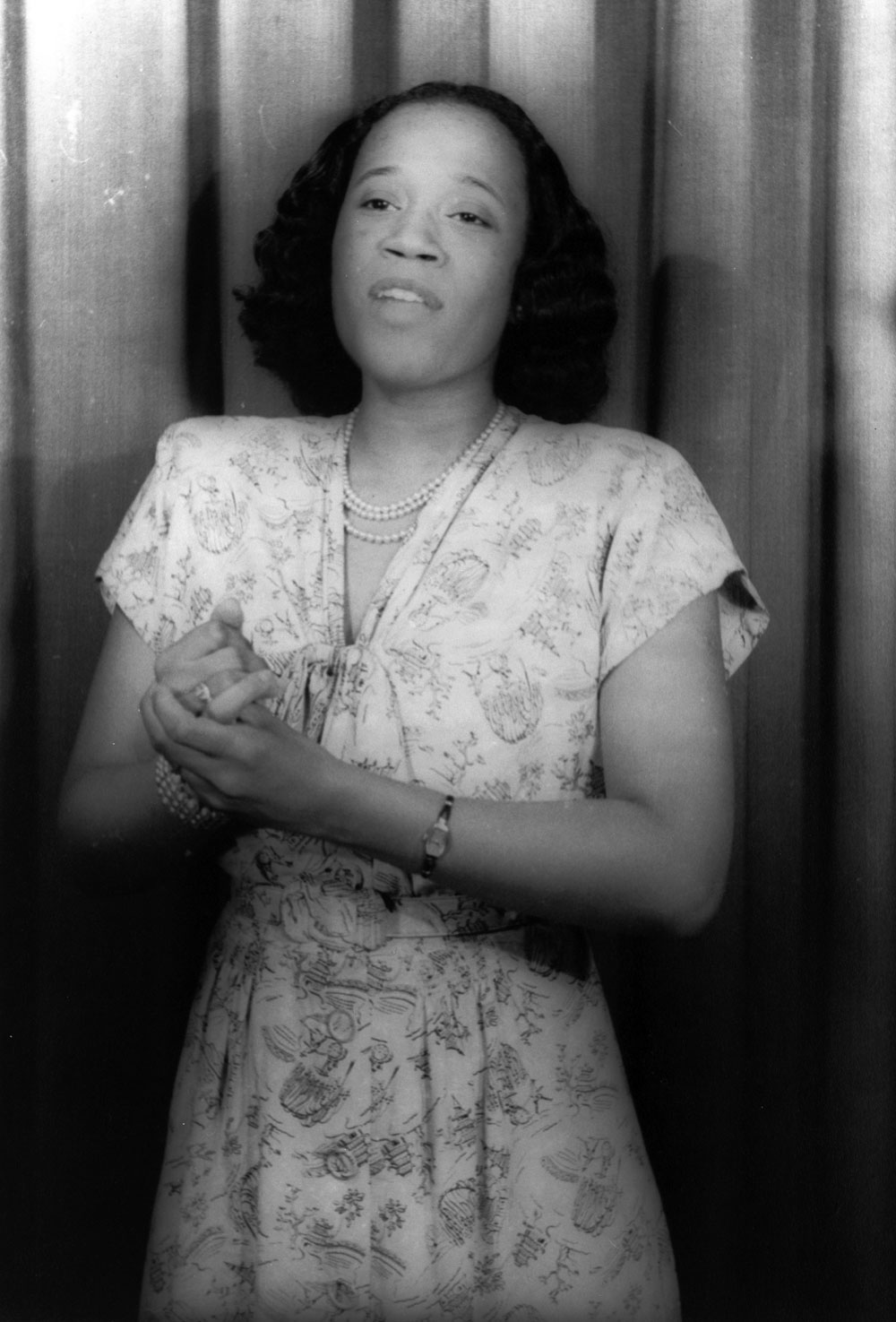
Camilla Williams, photo taken by Carl Van Vechten, 1946.

Camilla Ella Williams (October 18, 1919 – January 29, 2012) was an American operatic soprano who performed nationally and internationally. After studying with renowned teachers in New York City, she was the first African American to receive a regular contract with a major American opera company, the New York City Opera. She had earlier won honors in vocal competitions and the Marian Anderson Fellowship in 1943–44.

In 1954 she became the first African American to sing a major role with the Vienna State Opera. She later also performed as a soloist with numerous European orchestras. As a concert artist, she toured throughout the United States as well as Asia, Australia and New Zealand. In 1977, she was the first African American appointed as Professor of Voice at Indiana University, where she taught until 1997.

== Early life and education ==
On October 18, 1919, Camilla Ella Williams was born in Danville, Virginia, to Fannie Carey Williams, a laundress, and Cornelius Booker Williams, a chauffeur. She was the youngest of four children. Her siblings were Mary, Helen, and Cornelius. Williams grew up in a poor neighborhood with music as an important part of her family. Even her grandfather, Alexander Carey, was a choir leader and singer. Her parents instilled an appreciation for music, church, and education during her childhood. By the age of eight, Camilla enjoyed playing the piano, and singing at school and Danville's Calvary Baptist Church.

Williams trained at Virginia State College, now Virginia State University, and received her bachelor's degree in music education. After her college education, she left her job as a third grade teacher to study music in Philadelphia with a prestigious voice instructor, Marion Szekely Freschl. To help Williams pay for her new studies, Tossie P. Whiting, former English teacher of hers at Virginia State College, founded the Camilla Williams fund. She earned a Marian Anderson Award in 1943 and 1944, and she continued to receive honors in vocal competitions.

== Career ==
Beginning in 1944, Williams performed on the coast-to-coast RCA radio network. In 1946 she was the first African American to receive a regular contract with a major American opera company, making her debut with the New York City Opera in the title role in Puccini's Madama Butterfly. Her performance was hailed by a critic for The New York Times as "an instant and pronounced success." During her time at the New York City Opera, she performed Nedda in Leoncavallo's Pagliacci, Mimi in Puccini's La bohème, Marguerite in Gounod's Faust, Micaela in Bizet's Carmen, and the title role in Verdi's Aida.

Williams sang throughout the United States and Europe with various other opera companies. In 1951 she sang Bess in the landmark, first complete recording of Gershwin's Porgy and Bess, alongside bass-baritone Lawrence Winters and conductor Lehman Engel. Though she enjoyed the recording experience, she believed strongly that the work ought to be restaged to better portray contemporary African American life, reflecting her decision to refrain from performing the work on stage.

In 1954 she became the first African American to sing a major role with the Vienna State Opera, and performed her signature role in Madama Butterfly. In August 1963, as part of the civil rights March on Washington for Jobs and Freedom, she sang "The Star-Spangled Banner" at the White House and, when scheduled performer Marian Anderson was delayed trying to get through the gathered throngs, Williams sang the anthem before 250,000 people at the Lincoln Memorial, before Martin Luther King Jr. delivered his "I Have a Dream" speech.

A noted concert artist, Williams toured throughout the United States, Latin America, in fourteen African countries, as well as numerous countries in Asia: Formosa, South Korea, China, Japan, Laos, South Vietnam, the Philippines, New Zealand and Australia. In addition, she was a soloist with the Royal Philharmonic, BBC Symphony, Berlin Philharmonic, Vienna Symphony, Chicago Symphony, Philadelphia Orchestra and the New York Philharmonic under the direction of Leopold Stokowski. In 1950 she recorded Mahler's Symphony No. 8 with Stokowski and the New York Philharmonic.

During the 1970s, Williams taught voice at many places, including Brooklyn College, Bronx College, Queens College, Talent Unlimited, and Danville Museum of Fine Arts.

Williams was the first African-American Professor of Voice appointed to the voice faculty of what is now known as the Indiana University Jacobs School of Music in 1977. In 1984 she became the first African-American instructor at the Central Conservatory of Music in Beijing, China. In 1997 Camilla Williams became a Professor Emerita of Voice at Indiana University Jacobs School of Music, but continued to teach privately.

== Marriage and family ==
In 1950, Williams married Charles T. Beavers, a civil rights lawyer who worked closely with Malcolm X. He died in 1969.

From 2000 to 2011, she lived in companionship with her accompanist Boris Bazala, from Bulgaria.

== Legacy and honors ==
- 1995, she was the inaugural recipient of the National Opera Association's "Lift Every Voice" Legacy Award, honoring the contributions of African Americans to the field of opera.
- 1996, she was honored as an Outstanding African American Singer/Pioneer by Harvard University.
- 2000, her career as a pioneering African-American opera singer was profiled in Aida's Brothers and Sisters: Black Voices in Opera, a PBS documentary first broadcast in February of that year.
- 2006, Williams was also profiled in the 2006 PBS documentary The Mystery of Love.
- 2007, she was one of eight women honored by the Library of Virginia during Women's History Month as part of its Virginia Women in History project.
- On February 11, 2009, a Tribute to Camilla Williams program was held in New York, sponsored by the New York City Opera and the Schomburg Center for Research in Black Culture.
- On September 4, 2009, she was awarded the President's Medal for Excellence by Indiana University.
- In 2011 her autobiography, The Life of Camilla Williams, African American Classical Singer and Opera Diva, was published by the Edwin Mellen Press.

== Sources ==
- Elizabeth Nash. "A Day with Camilla Williams", Opera Quarterly 18, no. 2 (2002): 219–230.
- Stephanie Shonekan and Camilla Williams, The Life of Camilla Williams, The African American Classical Singer and Opera Diva, Edwin Mellen Press, 2011. ISBN 0-7734-1483-5.
- Eileen Southern, The Music of Black Americans: A History, W. W. Norton & Company; 3rd edition, 1997. ISBN 0-393-97141-4
