= George T. Simon =

American jazz writer and drummer (1912–2001)

- Born: George Thomas Simon; May 9, 1912
- Died: February 13, 2001 (aged 88)
- Occupation: Writer
- Relatives: Richard L. Simon (brother); Joanna Simon (niece); Lucy Simon (niece); Carly Simon (niece)

George Thomas Simon (May 9, 1912 – February 13, 2001) was an American jazz writer and occasional drummer. He began as a drummer and performed in this role in early versions of Glenn Miller's orchestra. He wrote about that orchestra in 1974 with Glenn Miller and His Orchestra, known for being the most comprehensive writing on Glenn Miller and his big band.

== Life and work ==
Simon was born and died in New York City, New York. Simon was born into a wealthy and talented family. Not only was his father wealthy, but his brother, Richard L. Simon, was the co-founder of the American publishing house Simon & Schuster, and singer-songwriter Carly Simon is one of his nieces. He graduated with a Bachelor of Arts degree from Harvard College in 1934, and began working for Metronome magazine the following year. He was editor-in-chief of Metronome from 1939 to 1955 and shifted its emphasis from a publisher of technical articles to a chronicler of the swing era. Simon was probably the most influential jazz commentator during the swing era. Thanks to his inside connections with the jazz world, he was able to report information about bands and their personnel with great accuracy. After leaving Metronome, he was involved with the Jazztone Society (1956–57), was a consultant to the Timex All-Star Jazz Show broadcast from 1957 to 1959, and wrote about jazz for the New York Herald Tribune and the New York Post daily newspapers. He also composed liner notes for musicians including Thelonious Monk. In 1978, he won a Grammy Award for Best Album Notes.

Simon appeared as an imposter for Joe Rosenthal on the March 5, 1962 episode of the CBS television game show To Tell the Truth, receiving two of the four votes.

Simon died of pneumonia in 2001 at the age of 88, after years of suffering from Parkinson's disease. He was inducted into the Big Band and Jazz Hall of Fame the following year (2002).

== Selected bibliography ==
- The Feeling of Jazz, 1961
- The Sinatra Report, 1965
- The Big Bands, 1968
- Simon Says: The Sights and Sounds of the Big Band Era, 1971
- Glenn Miller and His Orchestra, 1974
- The Big Bands Songbook, 1975
- The Best of the Music Makers, 1979
