= Tanglewood Music Center =

Annual summer music academy in Lenox, Massachusetts, US

- Formation: 1940; 86 years ago
- Type: Classical music
- Purpose: Music Festival, Summer academy for pre-professional musicians
- Location: Lenox, Massachusetts
- Coordinates: 42°21′08″N 73°18′40″W
- Region served: The Berkshires
- Director: Edward Gazouleas
- Key people: Serge Koussevitsky, founder
- Parent organization: Boston Symphony Orchestra
- Website: www.bso.org/tmc
- Formerly called: Berkshire Music Center

The Tanglewood Music Center is an annual summer music academy in Lenox, Massachusetts, United States, in which emerging professional musicians participate in performances, master classes and workshops. The center operates as a part of the Tanglewood Music Festival, an outdoor concert series and the summer home of the Boston Symphony Orchestra (BSO).

== History ==
The Tanglewood Music Center (TMC) was founded in 1940 as the Berkshire Music Center by the BSO's music director, Serge Koussevitzky, three years after the establishment of Tanglewood as the summer home of the BSO. He served as director of the center until one year after his retirement with the BSO, when he was succeeded by new BSO director Charles Münch, who ran the TMC from 1951 until 1962. Munch was succeeded by BSO director Erich Leinsdorf, who was TMC director from 1963 to 1970.

In 1970, three years before he was appointed as Music Director of the BSO, Seiji Ozawa took over BSO activities at Tanglewood, with Gunther Schuller as TMC director and Leonard Bernstein as general advisor. In 1975, the Italian conductor Franco Ferrara began teaching conducting at TMC. Schuller remained as director until August 1984 when he resigned over differences with Ozawa.

Pianist and conductor Leon Fleisher took over the direction of TMC in 1985, but resigned abruptly several years later in 1997 after a "lengthy, bitter dispute" with Ozawa. Fleisher was replaced by Ellen Highstein in 1998. Ozawa was succeeded as BSO director in 2001 by James Levine, who conducted some TMC concerts and operas and worked with the student conductors in addition to leading Tanglewood's BSO programs. Levine left the BSO in 2011 after health issues.

On May 16, 2013, the BSO announced Andris Nelsons as its 15th Music Director. Since assuming his post in 2015, Nelsons has worked with the TMC Orchestra every season and given frequent conducting masterclasses to the conducting fellows of the TMC. Following Highstein's retirement Michael Nock, who previously served as associate director, was named interim director for the summer of 2022. In October 2023, violist Edward Gazouleas was announced as director designate of the Tanglewood Music Center.

== Performance and other facilities ==
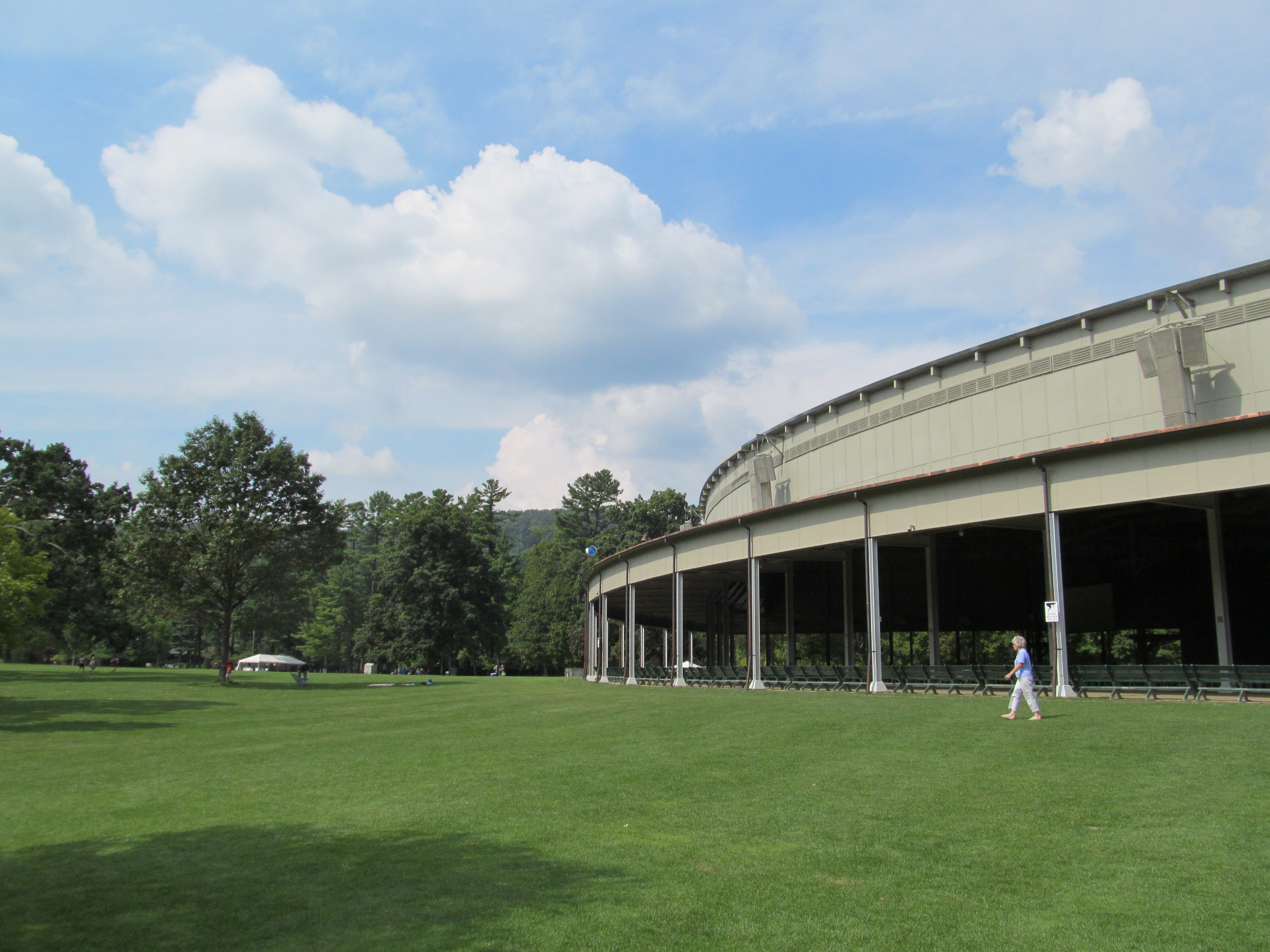
The Koussevitzky Music Shed

Tanglewood activities take place on 210 acres (85 ha) of meadow, most of which was donated to the BSO in 1936 by the Tappan family.

Students of the TMC are typically housed in Miss Hall's School, a boarding school for high-school aged girls in nearby Pittsfield. Until 1999, composition students at the festival were housed separately at the Koussevitzky mansion (Seranak) near the grounds; this practice ended with Highstein's appointment as director.

== Directors ==
- Serge Koussevitzky (1940–1950)
- Charles Münch (1950–1962)
- Erich Leinsdorf (1963–1970)
- Gunther Schuller (1970–1984)
- Leon Fleisher (1985–1997)
- Ellen Highstein (1998–2021)
- Michael Nock, Interim (2022)
- Edward Gazouleas (2023 – present)

== Students and faculty ==
Koussevitzky's vision for the TMC was an institution where students would work closely with faculty members of the BSO and guest artists, as well as with each other.

Alumni of the TMC constitute a significant presence in the professional classical music scene: it is estimated that 20% of American symphony orchestra members, as well as 30% of all first-chair players, have attended the program. Notable alums in composition include John Adams, Luciano Berio, Leonard Bernstein, William Bolcom, Mario Davidovsky, David Del Tredici, Jacob Druckman, Lukas Foss, Michael Gandolfi, John Harbison (who attended as a conductor/vocalist), Russell Peck, Ned Rorem, Gitta Steiner, Steven Mackey, Richard Aaker Trythall, Norma Wendelburg, and composer and conductor Oliver Knussen, among many others. Conducting alums include Leonard Bernstein, Robert Spano, Eleazar de Carvalho, Seiji Ozawa, Lorin Maazel, Claudio Abbado, Michael Tilson Thomas, David Zinman, Christoph von Dohnanyi, Zubin Mehta, and Marin Alsop. Other notable TMC alumni include Dawn Upshaw, Wynton Marsalis, and Burt Bacharach.

== Festival of Contemporary Music ==
The Festival of Contemporary Music is an annual event at Tanglewood, organized by the Tanglewood Music Center. It began in 1964 as a project of then BSO Music Director Erich Leinsdorf, the newly appointed coordinator of contemporary music studies at the TMC, Gunther Schuller, and noted contemporary music patron Paul Fromm. Recent Festivals have focused on composers born in 1938 (2007) and the music of Elliott Carter (2008).
