= Shirley Verrett =

American opera singer (1931–2010)

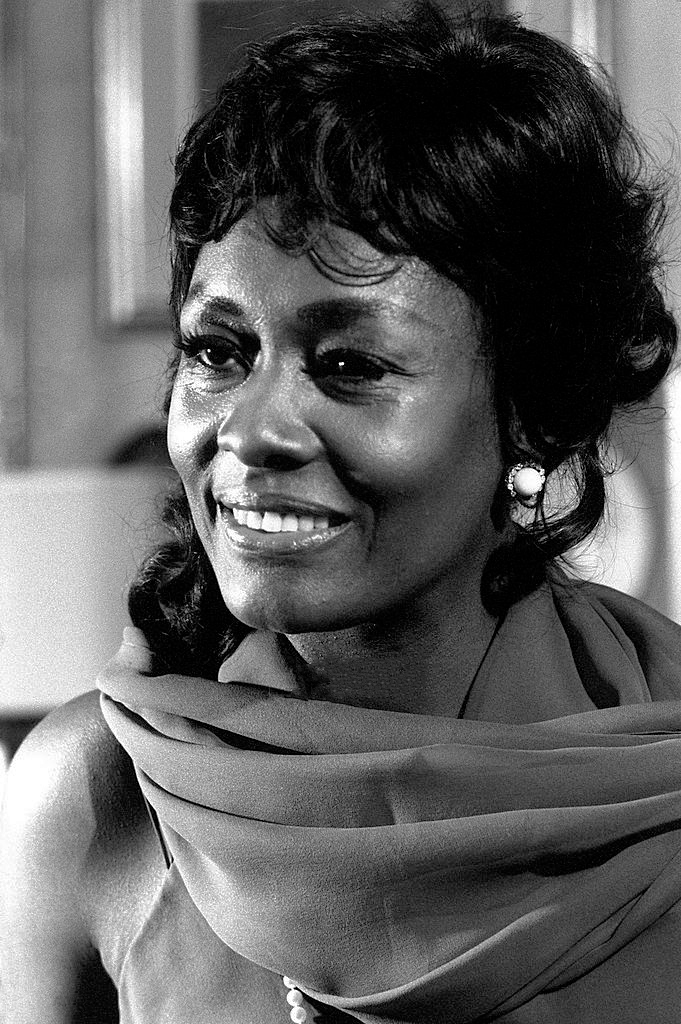
- Verrett in Milan, 1975
- Born: May 31, 1931; New Orleans, Louisiana, U.S.
- Died: November 5, 2010 (aged 79); Ann Arbor, Michigan, U.S.
- Other name: Shirley Carter
- Education: Oakwood University; Ventura College; Juilliard School
- Occupations: Operatic mezzo-soprano and soprano; Academic teacher
- Organizations: Metropolitan Opera; University of Michigan
- Spouse(s): James L. Carter (m. 1951; div. 1959) Louis Lo Monaco (m. 1963)
- Children: 1
- Awards: Marian Anderson Award; Ordre des Arts et des Lettres

Shirley Verrett (May 31, 1931 – November 5, 2010) was an American operatic mezzo-soprano who successfully transitioned into soprano roles making her a Soprano sfogato. Verrett enjoyed great fame from the late 1960s through the 1990s; she was particularly known for performing works by Giuseppe Verdi and Gaetano Donizetti.

== Life and career ==
=== Early life and education ===
Born into an African-American family of devout Catholics in New Orleans, Verrett was raised in Los Angeles. She recalled in her memoir that her mother went from being a strict Catholic to an even stricter Seventh-Day Adventist, and she and her siblings were educated in a Seventh Day Adventist school system. She sang in church and showed early musical abilities, but initially a singing career was frowned upon by her family.

Verrett attended Oakwood University, a private historically black Seventh-Day Adventist university in Huntsville, Alabama, for a semester in 1949, but then returned to southern California and completed an associate degree in real estate at Ventura College. Though successful as a real estate agent, Verrett reconsidered her career choice and started serious voice study. In 1955, she won two California state competitions sponsored by the Young Musicians Foundation, and later that year she appeared on Talent Scouts, a national television show hosted by Arthur Godfrey. Her appearance on that program led to a scholarship at the Juilliard School New York. Verrett went on to study with Anna Fitziu and with Marion Szekely Freschl at Juilliard. In 1961, she won the Metropolitan Opera National Council Auditions.

=== International career ===
In 1957, Verrett made her operatic debut in Britten's The Rape of Lucretia under her then-married name of Shirley Carter. She later used the name Shirley Verrett-Carter, and ultimately just Shirley Verrett. In 1958, she made her New York City Opera debut as Irina in Kurt Weill's Lost in the Stars. In 1959, she made her European debut at the Cologne Opera in Nicolas Nabokov's Rasputins Tod. In 1962, she received critical acclaim for portraying Bizet's Carmen at the Festival dei Due Mondi in Spoleto; she repeated the role at the Bolshoi Theatre in 1963, and at the New York City Opera in 1964 (opposite Richard Cassilly and Norman Treigle). Verrett first appeared at the Royal Opera House, Covent Garden in 1966 as Ulrica in Verdi's Un ballo in maschera.

Verrett appeared in the first concert ever televised from Lincoln Center in 1962, and also appeared that year in the first of the Leonard Bernstein Young People's Concerts televised from that venue, in what is now David Geffen Hall. She portrayed the title role in the world premiere of Hugo Weisgall's opera Athaliah on February 17, 1964 at Philharmonic Hall, New York.

In 1968, Verrett made her debut at the Metropolitan Opera as Carmen, and at La Scala in 1969 in Saint-Saëns' Samson and Dalila. Verrett's mezzo roles included Cassandra and Didon in Berlioz' Les Troyens, including its Met premiere, when she sang both roles in the same performance, Verdi's Ulrica in Un ballo in maschera, Amneris in Aida, Eboli in Don Carlo and Azucena in Il trovatore, Donizetti's Elisabetta I (written as a soprano role) in Maria Stuarda and Leonora in La favorita, Orfeo in Gluck's Orfeo ed Euridice, and Rossini’s Neocles in L'assedio di Corinto and Sinaide in Moïse. Most of these roles were recorded, either professionally or privately.

Beginning in the late 1970s, Verrett began to tackle soprano roles, including Selika in L'Africaine, Judith in Bartók's Bluebeard's Castle, Lady Macbeth in Macbeth, Madame Lidoine in Poulenc's Dialogues of the Carmelites (Met 1977), Tosca, Norma (from Boston 1976 till Messina 1989), Aida (Boston 1980 and 1989), Desdemona (Otello) (1981), Leonore (Fidelio, Met 1983), Iphigénie (1984–85), Alceste (1985), and Médée (Luigi Cherubini) (1986). In December 1978, Verrett sang the role of Tosca in a Live from the Met television broadcast opposite Luciano Pavarotti as Cavaradossi and Cornell MacNeil as Scarpia.

In 1990, Verrett sang Didon in Les Troyens at the inauguration of the Opéra Bastille in Paris, and added a new role to her repertoire: Santuzza in Mascagni's Cavalleria rusticana, in Siena. In 1994, she made her Broadway debut in the Tony Award-winning revival of Rodgers and Hammerstein's Carousel at Lincoln Center's Vivian Beaumont Theater, playing Nettie Fowler.

=== Teaching ===
In 1996, Verrett joined the faculty of the University of Michigan School of Music, Theatre & Dance as a professor of voice and the James Earl Jones Distinguished University Professor of Voice. The preceding year, at the National Opera Association Gala Banquet and Concert honoring Mattiwilda Dobbs, Todd Duncan, Camilla Williams, and Robert McFerrin, Verrett said:

I'm always so happy when I can speak to young people because I remember those who were kind to me that didn't need to be. The first reason I came tonight was for the honorees because I needed to say this. The second reason I came was for you, the youth. These great people here were the trailblazers for me. I hope in my own way I did something to help your generation, and that you will help the next. This is the way it's supposed to be. You just keep passing that baton on!

=== Personal life ===
Verrett married twice, first in 1951, to real estate broker and sheriff's deputy James L. Carter. However, Verrett experienced abusive treatment from her husband and they divorced in 1959. In 1963, she wed artist Louis Lo Monaco. She was survived by Lo Monaco and their adopted daughter and their granddaughter. She was also the estranged paternal aunt of the controversial American media personality Durek Verrett.

Verrett died in Ann Arbor, Michigan, aged 79, on November 5, 2010, from heart failure following an undisclosed illness. An ongoing annual Shirley Verrett Award, that recognizes “a faculty member whose performance, scholarship, or service supports the success of female students or faculty in the arts who come from diverse cultural and racial backgrounds” was established in 2011 by the University of Michigan in her honor.

== Autobiography ==
In 2003, Shirley Verrett published a memoir, I Never Walked Alone (ISBN 978-0-471-20991-1), in which she spoke frankly about the racism she encountered as a black person in the American classical music world. When the conductor Leopold Stokowski invited her to sing with the Houston Symphony in the early 1960s, he had to rescind his invitation when the orchestra board refused to accept a black soloist. Stokowski later made amends by giving her a prestigious date with the Philadelphia Orchestra.

== Honors ==
- John Hay Whitney Foundation Grant, Martha Baird Rockefeller Fund scholarship, and Ford Foundation Opera Fellowship
- William Matheus Sullivan Award
- Named an African American Woman of Distinction by Essence Magazine
- Marian Anderson Award (1957)
- Walter W. Naumburg Foundation Award (1958)
- Chevalier des Arts et des Lettres (1970)
- Achievement Award of the Women's Division of the Albert Einstein College of Medicine (1975)
- Honorary Doctor of Musical Arts degree from the College of the Holy Cross (1978)
- NAACP Special Achievement Award (1980)
- Commandeur des Arts et des Lettres (1984)
- Honorary Doctor of Music degree from Northeastern University, Verrett's alma mater (1987)
- Honorary Doctor of Music degree from the Juilliard School (2002)

The Shirley Verrett Award was established at the University of Michigan in 2011 by the Office of the Senior Vice Provost
