= Andrea Heinemann Simon =

Mother of Carly Simon (1909–1994)

- Born: Andrea Heinemann; March 24, 1909; Philadelphia, Pennsylvania, U.S.
- Died: February 15, 1994 (aged 84); Riverdale, Bronx, New York, U.S.
- Occupations: Activist; philanthropist
- Spouse: Richard L. Simon (m. 1934; died 1960)
- Children: 4, including Joanna, Lucy and Carly
- Relatives: Sally Taylor (granddaughter)

Andrea Heinemann Simon (née Heinemann; March 24, 1909 – February 15, 1994) was an American civil rights activist, philanthropist, and the mother of singer Carly Simon.

== Life and career ==
Andrea Louise Heinemann was born and raised in Philadelphia, the second child of Ofelia "Elma Marie" (Oliete/Ollright), known as "Chibie", and Frederick Adolph "Fred" Heinemann. Her father was of German descent. Her mother was born in Cuba, and was of pardo heritage, a freed-slave descendant (the show Finding Your Roots has tested her daughter Carly's DNA as 10% African and 2% Indigenous).

Heinemann married Richard Leo Simon (March 6, 1899 – July 29, 1960), co-founder of the publishing company Simon & Schuster, on August 3, 1934. At the time of their engagement, Heinemann worked as a receptionist for the company. They had four children:

- Joanna Simon (1936–2022), former opera mezzo-soprano and New York real estate agent
- Lucy Simon (1940–2022), Broadway score writer
- Carly Simon (born 1943), singer-songwriter
- Peter Simon (1947–2018), photographer

The family resided in the Riverdale neighborhood of the Bronx.

Simon was actively involved in the civil rights movement and community work. This included serving on the board of directors of the Riverdale Mental Health Association for over 30 years and the Riverdale Chapter of the United Nations Association.

In 1994, Simon died of lung cancer at her Riverdale home at the age of 84.
