= Sally Taylor (musician) =

American singer-songwriter (born 1974)

- Born: Sarah Maria Taylor; January 7, 1974 (age 52); New York City, U.S.
- Education: Tabor Academy, Brown University
- Occupations: Artist; singer; songwriter; musician; writer; educator
- Years active: 1980–present
- Spouse: Dean Bragonier (m. 2003)
- Children: 1
- Parents: James Taylor (father); Carly Simon (mother)
- Relatives: Richard L. Simon (grandfather); Andrea Heinemann Simon (grandmother); Joanna Simon (aunt); Lucy Simon (aunt)
- Musical career
- Genre: Indie rock
- Label: Blue Elbow
- Formerly of: The Slip; The Boogies
- Website: sallytaylor.com

Sarah Maria "Sally" Taylor (born January 7, 1974) is an American singer, songwriter, artist, musician, writer, and educator. She has released three studio albums. Her songs have appeared in the films Anywhere but Here, Interview, Adventureland, and Me, Myself & Irene. She has performed on The Oprah Winfrey Show, The Martha Stewart Show, and The Late Show with Stephen Colbert.

Taylor is the founder of the art organization Consenses, and created the social-emotional learning (SEL) Consenses Classroom. She is an advocate and educator for youth with dyslexia, and has spoken publicly about her own struggles with dyslexia, including giving a TEDx talk in Nashville, Tennessee.

She taught songwriting and performance at Berklee College of Music. She is also a philanthropist who has worked toward addressing the problem of landmines in Southeast Asia.

== Early life ==
Sarah Maria Taylor was born on January 7, 1974, in New York City, to James Taylor and Carly Simon. She attended Tabor Academy and began writing songs as a teenager. When asked about her mother's role in learning how to write songs, she said, "I asked my mom 'can you show me how to write a song?' and she said 'Sal, if you're meant to write songs you'll just know how to do it'."

She played with various bands in high school, and was a co-founder of the student rock band The Slip.

While attending Brown University, Taylor taught herself to play the guitar and performed as a solo artist.

At 20 years old, she survived a plane crash in Peru, motivating her to organize and record all of her songs, which led to the recording of her first album, Tomboy Bride.

== Career ==
Taylor is a singer-songwriter, guitarist, artist, writer, educator, and philanthropist. As a musical artist, she has been in several music groups as well as having a solo career. She toured extensively in her solo career and had several songs featured in film and television. She has performed on talk shows such as the Oprah Winfrey Show.

She is a former educator at the Berklee School of Music, and created the award-winning social-emotional learning (SEL) curriculum, Consenses Classroom. Taylor is an educator and advocate for youth with dyslexia. She was awarded the Hamilton School Life Achievement Award by the Wheeler School, along with her husband Dean Bragonier, for overcoming the challenges of learning differences. Taylor has spoken publicly on the topic at TEDx Nashville and the Dyslexic Advantage Leadership Conference.

Taylor is the founder of Consenses, a global, multidisciplinary, artistic collaboration where artists of different disciplines use one another's work as a catalyst for their own original pieces, resulting in an artistic chain reaction. She co-founded the Tranquility Project, a non-profit organization, that raised money to remove land mines in Southeast Asia and provide assistance to land mine victims.

Taylor, who is vegan, converted a Volkswagen van, called "Sally in the Raw", into a food cart featuring vegan and raw foods.

=== Music ===
Taylor is a singer, songwriter, musician (guitar), and recording artist. In addition to her solo career, she is a former member of The Slip and The Boogies. She turned down offers from major labels and in 1998, formed the indie record label Blue Elbow, through which she released three studio albums, Tomboy Bride (1999), Apt. #6S (2000), and Shotgun (2001).

She toured extensively throughout the US (1999–2002) with her five-piece Colorado-based band, playing 200 shows a year. The band was composed of Chris Soucy (guitars/vocals); Kenny Castro (bass); and Brian McRae, Kyle Comerford, and Dean Oldencott (drummers). Taylor wrote Tails From the Road 1998-2002 documenting her tour, including performing shows with her brother Ben and crew.

Taylor retired from touring at age 30, moved to Boston, and began teaching music at the Berklee College of Music.

=== Consenses ===
In 2012, Taylor founded Consenses, a global, multidisciplinary, artistic collaboration where artists of different disciplines use one another's work as a catalyst for their own original pieces, resulting in an artistic chain reaction. Hundreds of artists have participated, including Jimmy Buffett, Natasha Bedingfield, her mother, Carly Simon, her father, James Taylor, BalletBoyz, and Michael Nunn. Taylor was featured in the 2014 documentary Consenses - The Story by Erica Hill. Taylor also created the award-winning social-emotional learning (SEL) curriculum Consenses Classroom, in collaboration with Harvard Graduate School of Education graduate students.

=== The Tranquility Project ===
While traveling in Cambodia in 2002, Taylor and her husband Dean Bragonier visited the Angkor National Museum. where they met a nine-year-old girl who had lost a limb. She told them that she would never be able to marry because of her maiming. They were so moved by the experience that they formed the Tranquility Project, a non-profit organization that raised money to remove land mines in Southeast Asia and provide assistance to land mine victims. She appeared on the CD Too Many Years to benefit Clear Path International's work with land mine survivors.

In 2007, Taylor hosted a charity concert in her home of Boulder, Colorado, with singer-songwriter Wendy Woo and the band Something Underground, made up of brothers Seth and Josh Larson. Taylor has joined the band in the last few years, traveling through the Midwest and Southeast Asia twice, performing charity concerts.

== Personal life ==
Taylor is married to Dean Bragonier. On October 4, 2007, she gave birth to their son, Bodhi Taylor Bragonier. Both she and her husband have been diagnosed with dyslexia. Her son also has dyslexia, and has been the inspiration behind funding other families with similar NoticeAbility diagnoses.

As the daughter of singer-songwriters James Taylor and Carly Simon, Taylor's birth was mentioned in the song "Sarah Maria" on James Taylor's 1975 album Gorilla. Carly Simon's album Hotcakes, released in January 1974, contains a song called "Think I'm Gonna Have a Baby", and the cover photo is a study of a pregnant Simon.

Taylor graduated from Tabor Academy, a college-preparatory boarding school in Marion, Massachusetts. She attended Brown University, studying medical anthropology.

Taylor and her family now reside in Halifax, Nova Scotia.
