= Wendy Woo =

American singer-songwriter

- Genres: Pop, rock, funk, blues, folk, jazz
- Occupation(s): Singer, songwriter
- Instrument: Guitar
- Labels: WooMusic
- Website: wendywoo.com

Wendy Woo is a singer/songwriter in Colorado. She is also known for her guitar work, especially using her acoustic guitar as a percussion instrument. Woo is one of a small number of Colorado performers to win the Westword Music Awards five times (after that, a five-time winner becomes ineligible and is named a member of the Westword Hall of Fame).

Woo plays both acoustic and electric guitar. She performs both as a solo and with her band. She has recorded more than 100 original songs in a variety of genres: folk, jazz, blues, funk, rock, and pop.

During her career, she has been associated with three different Colorado music scenes: Boulder/Nederland, then Denver, and now Northern Colorado. Because Woo is so popular in Colorado, she has been called the "Queen of the Denver Scene," the "Denver DIY queen," and the "queen of the local scene." She has toured nationally, but Colorado has always been her homebase. "I know that I do get lumped into that hometown artist thing but ... well, the bottom line is that I love it here."

== Childhood with the Beats ==
Wendy Woo is the daughter of Bataan and Jane Faigao, founding faculty members of Naropa University in Boulder.

In 1982, Jane coordinated a 10-day conference at Naropa to celebrate the 25th anniversary of Jack Kerouac's book, On the Road. Among those involved with the conference were notable members of the Beat Generation, including Allen Ginsberg, William Burroughs, Gary Snyder, Gregory Corso, and Lawrence Ferlinghetti, plus others influenced by the Beats, including Ken Kesey, Hunter S. Thompson, Abbie Hoffman, Timothy Leary, and Paul Krassner. According to author Brian Hassett, "It was every major Beat figure alive at the time, except Gary Snyder who was officially off building a zendo (a Buddhist meditation hall) in California ..."

The Faigao home became a gathering spot for this group whenever they were in Boulder and Woo got to know them well. Her song, "One Way Ticket," mentions growing up as a "beatnik's kid," and Gregory Corso teaching her how to play poker. One of Ginsberg’s photos shows William Burroughs in the Faigao home.

The family would stay with Allen Ginsberg whenever they were in New York. He dedicated a poem, "In My Kitchen in New York – for Bataan Faigao," to her father, which Ginsberg recites on video while doing tai chi. (The Faigaos started the tai chi program at Naropa.)

Woo and her father did an album of music and poetry together, Ecolalia, which was named by both the Denver Post and Westword as one of the top 10 Colorado albums of 2001.

== Music career ==
=== Music training ===
While Woo grew up singing, she didn't start playing the guitar until she was 18 and wanted to accompany herself. She began writing songs and performing in songwriting circles. After a year of that, she decided she wanted to become more serious about music and went to the University of New Mexico to study classical guitar. One year later, she transferred to the University of Colorado Boulder where she studied guitar, jazz, jazz theory, percussion, music theory, and composing.

=== Early career ===
She got her professional start in music when she became one of the first employees at the Fox Theatre, both tending bar and as a performer. (Rolling Stone named the Fox the fourth best music club in the country.) One of Woo's early achievements was to win a spot on the 1999 Lilith Fair as a Village Stage performer.

=== Colorado music significance ===
Woo has been an integral part of three different Colorado music scenes: First Boulder/Nederland. The three Boulder papers, the Daily Camera, the Colorado Daily, and the Boulder Weekly, named her "best singer/songwriter," "best local artist," and "best local musician," respectively. When FoodNation with Bobby Flay taped the Boulder episode, Woo and her band were the featured musicians.

Then Denver. "Having moved from Boulder to Denver ... it's such a short distance, but it's an amazingly different scene." She sang the theme song for Denver's Fox 31's Good Day Colorado morning show; she was featured in the promo singing it from a downtown rooftop. Colorado governor John Hickenlooper, then mayor of Denver, performed her wedding ceremony.

And now that she lives in Loveland, she is part of the growing Northern Colorado music scene. Oskar Blues Brewery named a beer after her: Woo Woo Wheat. A Northern Colorado magazine put her on its cover as one of "NoCo's Mothers of Rock N' Roll." She was recognized by fellow musicians as the best singer/songwriter in Northern Colorado in 2018. And fans also named her best Northern Colorado singer/songwriter.

Because of each of her albums reflects her life at the time, different Colorado locations have resulted in different albums. Walking the Skyline was, for example, her "love song" to Denver. As one reviewer noted, "Woo's strongest asset is her own original music. Thoroughly Colorado ..."

=== WooMusic Inc. ===
Woo has always run her own music career. In 2004, she created a corporation, WooMusic, Inc., and has done her own recording, producing, booking, publicity, and publishing. She has been called a "one-woman music industry." And she has been a role model for other Colorado female singer/songwriters. Said one, “Well, we learned it all from Wendy Woo, didn’t we?”

Through much of her career, she averaged 200 shows a year (though less now that she has three small children). Live shows have been her form of music distribution; the more shows she played, the more CDs she sold directly to fans.

In addition to her own work, Woo produced 10 songs on Sally Taylor's first album. She was also a contributor to Taylor's 2014 Consenses project.

== Vocal chord surgery and recovery ==
Woo had vocal chord surgery in 2013 to remove cysts. She has fully recovered and continues to perform.

== Personal life ==
Woo lives in Loveland, Colorado and has three children.

Woo is a member of the Filipino American community. Her father, of Filipino/Chinese descent, was born in Cebu City, Philippines, and immigrated to New York City in 1964 to attend NYU. Her grandfather, Cornelio Faigao, was a famous Filipino poet, writer, and educator. Her aunt is the playwright, Linda Faigao-Hall.

== Discography ==
- Angels in the Crowd (1997)
- Wide Awake and Dreaming (1999)
- Ecolalia (2000)
- Gonna Wear Red (2002)
- Walking the Skyline (2004)
- Angels Laughing (2005)
- Luxury (2007)
- Saving Grace (2009)
- Austerity (2011)
- Live (2013)
- Live at the Dickens Opera House (DVD) (2013)
- Tipping Point (2015)
- The Immigrant (2019)
