= Tossie Whiting =

American educator

- Born: 1879
- Died: April 23, 1958 (aged 78–79)

Academic background
- Education: University of Chicago; Columbia University

Academic work
- Discipline: English
- Institutions: Virginia State University

Tossie Permelia Frances Whiting (1879 – April 23, 1958) was an American educator, and Dean of Women at Virginia State University from 1919 to 1936.

== Early life ==
Tossie Whiting was born in the Fulton Hill neighborhood of Richmond, Virginia, the daughter of Robert W. Whiting and Nancy Whiting. She graduated from Hartshorn Memorial College (then a high school) in 1895, then earned a bachelor's degree at the University of Chicago and a master's degree at Columbia University.

== Career ==
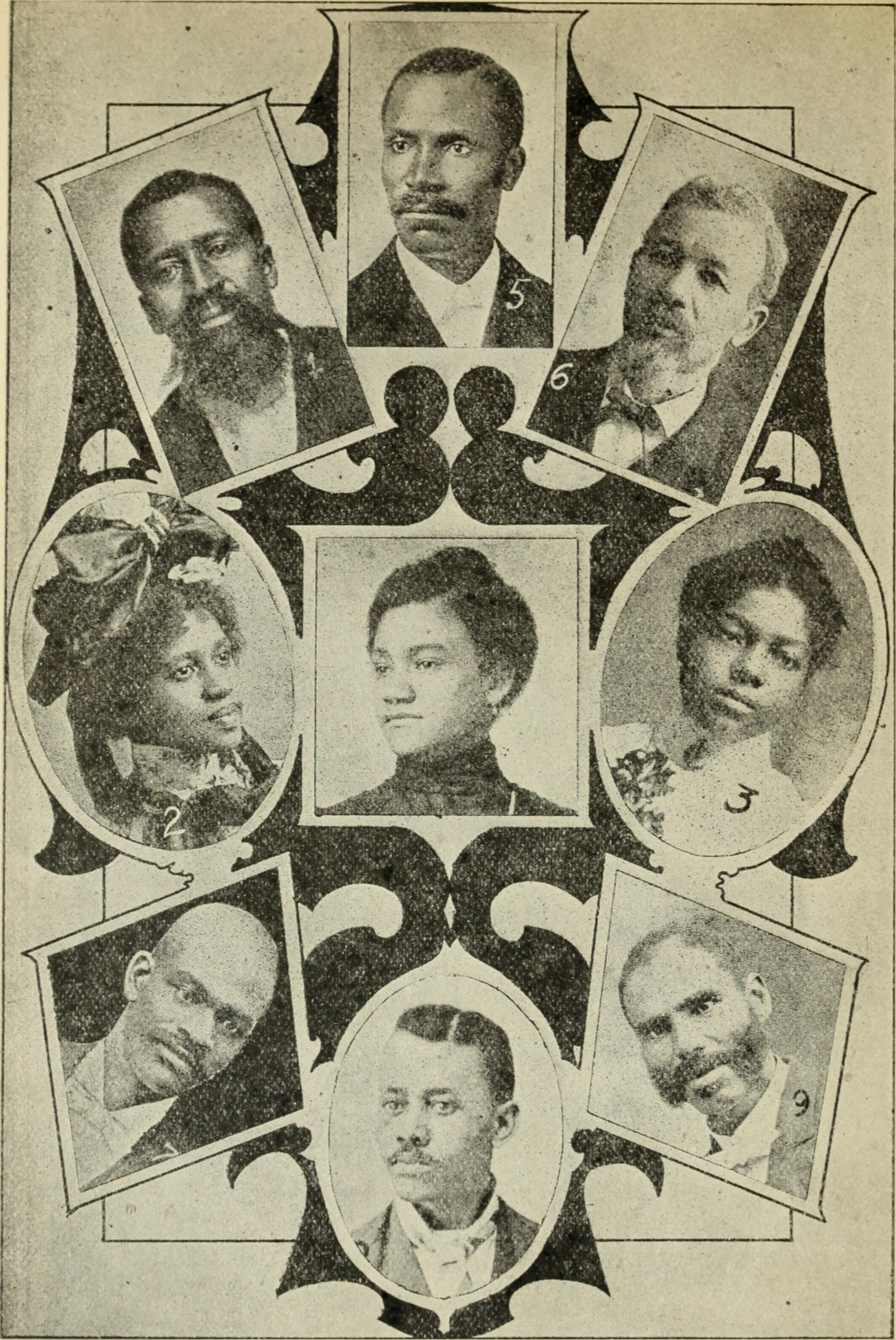
A page from The United Negro (1902); Tossie Whiting is featured center right, numbered 3

In 1901, Whiting was named a commissioner of the Negro Young People's Christian and Educational Congress.

Whiting worked at Virginia Normal and Industrial Institute from 1904 until 1948, when she retired. In 1919 the position of Dean of Women was created for her, and she was dean until 1936. In 1929 she was one of the founding members of the Association of Deans of Women and Advisors to Girls in Negro Schools, an offshoot of the National Association of College Women. She was an associate professor of English at Virginia State from 1936 until 1948. In 1958, a dormitory at the school was named Whiting Hall in her honor.

In 1945, she received an honorary doctorate from Virginia Union University, at a commencement ceremony where W. E. B. DuBois was the speaker. She was chair of the Hartshorn Memorial College Alumni Association from 1935 to 1947.

== Personal life ==
Whiting died in 1958, aged 79 years. A small collection of her papers are archived at Virginia Union University. Her brother Gregory W. Whiting also found a career in college administration, at Bluefield State College in West Virginia. Their sister Beatrice was a high school teacher.
