= Richard L. Simon =

American book publisher (1899–1960)

- Born: Richard Leo Simon; March 6, 1899; New York City, U.S.
- Died: July 29, 1960 (aged 61); New York City, U.S.
- Education: Columbia University
- Occupation: Businessman
- Years active: 1921−1957
- Known for: Co-founder of Simon & Schuster
- Spouse: Andrea Heinemann (m. 1934)
- Children: 4; including Joanna, Lucy and Carly
- Relatives: George T. Simon (brother); Sally Taylor (granddaughter)

Richard Leo Simon (March 6, 1899 – July 29, 1960) was an American book publisher. He was the co-founder, with Max Schuster, of the publishing house Simon & Schuster and father of singer-songwriter Carly Simon.

== Early life and family ==
Richard Leo Simon was born on March 6, 1899, in New York City to a wealthy Jewish family. His father, Leo Simon, was a prosperous feather- and silk manufacturer and milliner of German Jewish descent, while his mother, Anna (née Meier), was a German Jewish immigrant. Simon’s parents were active in the Ethical Culture movement, which emphasized universal morality. They sent Richard to the Ethical Cultural School and then to Columbia University.

After serving in World War I, Simon returned to the United States and, leveraging his talent for music, worked as a piano salesman before eventually launching his career in book publishing.

Richard Simon was the eldest of five siblings – Henry, Alfred, George, and Elizabeth – all of whom were named after British monarchs. His brother George T. Simon was a jazz drummer who played with Glenn Miller and later became a prominent critic, magazine editor, and author on jazz, particularly big bands and the swing era. Another brother, Henry W. Simon, was an English professor at Teachers College, Columbia University, a classical music critic for the newspaper PM, and an author of numerous books on opera. He eventually became an editor and vice president at Simon & Schuster. Alfred, another sibling, was a rehearsal pianist for Ira and George Gershwin; the programmer for light opera and show music at WQXR; and a noted author on musical theatre. His sister, Elizabeth, married physician Arthur Seligmann.

== Career ==
Simon began his career as a sugar importer and then became a piano salesman. It was while selling pianos that he met Max Schuster. Simon then became a salesman for the publisher Boni & Liveright where he quickly rose to sales manager.

Simon pooled $8,000 together with Max Schuster to publish the first book of crossword puzzles in 1924.

Simon was a pioneer in emphasizing marketing, merchandising, promotion and advertising for booksellers. Simon wrote a weekly column and advertorial in Publishers Weekly called the Inner Sanctum. His partner Max Schuster wrote a column of the same name for The New York Times. The title was also the name of the editorial room between their offices.

Michael Korda said that when he arrived to work as an editor at Simon & Schuster in 1958, he found a bronze plaque on his desk designed by Richard Simon that said, "Give the reader a break." This was a reminder to every editor that their job was to make things as easy and clear for the reader as possible.

Simon retired in 1957 after having two heart attacks.

== Personal life ==
On August 3, 1934, Simon married Andrea Heinemann, who worked as a switchboard operator at Simon & Schuster. Raised in Philadelphia, Heinemann was the daughter of a Cuban-born, Roman Catholic mother, Asunción María del Río, and a German-speaking Swiss father who had abandoned the family. She asserted that she was of partial "Moorish" origin based on her mother's exotic looks, but she was of Afro-Cuban descent.

They had four children:

- Joanna Simon (1936–2022), former opera mezzo-soprano and New York real estate agent
- Lucy Simon (1940–2022), Broadway score writer
- Carly Simon (born 1943), singer-songwriter
- Peter Simon (1947–2018), nationally renowned photographer

== Death ==
Simon died in 1960 after suffering a heart attack. Simon was a resident of Fieldston, an area within Riverdale in the Bronx.
