= West Street Massacre =

1980 event in New York City, United States

- Location: 40°43′59″N 74°0′36″W; Greenwich Village, Manhattan, New York City, U.S.
- Date: November 19, 1980; 45 years ago 10:50 p.m. – c. 11:00 p.m. (ETZ)
- Weapons: Uzi submachinegun; .357 Magnum Colt Python revolver; 9mm Beretta semi-automatic pistol; 9mm Browning semi-automatic pistol
- Deaths: 2
- Injuries: 8 (6 by gunfire)
- Perpetrator: Ronald K. Crumpley
- Motive: Homophobia

The West Street Massacre, also known as the Ramrod Massacre, was a mass shooting which took place on November 19, 1980, in the Greenwich Village neighborhood of New York City. Two people were killed and eight others were injured before the perpetrator, 38-year-old Ronald Crumpley was arrested by police.

Crumpley was tried for murder, but found not guilty by reason of insanity. Crumpley spent the rest of his life in mental institutions.

The New York Times coined the name "West Street Massacre". The alternative name is based on the shootings taking place around The Ramrod, a popular gay leather bar, where both fatalities occurred.

== West Street Massacre ==
=== Robbery spree ===
Three days before the shooting, Ronald Crumpley stole his father's Cadillac in New Rochelle, New York, to travel to Virginia. After visiting his sister in Richmond, he robbed a gun store in Midlothian on 17 November, stealing an Uzi submachine gun, a Colt Python revolver, a Beretta handgun and a Browning handgun. The same day, he robbed the Pioneer Savings and Loan Association in Colonial Heights for $3,001, before returning to New York.

=== Shooting ===
On November 19, 1980, shortly before 11 p.m., Crumpley started shooting indiscriminately at gay men in the Greenwich Village neighborhood with two stolen handguns. Crumpley first shot at three men outside a delicatessen located on the corner of Washington and 10th Streets, but they survived by hiding behind parked cars. Crumpley used an Uzi submachine gun outfitted with a 40-round magazine to fire into the line of people waiting to go into the Ramrod and shot through the window of the venue, where 150 people were at the time. Vernon Kroening, an organist at the nearby St. Joseph's Roman Catholic Church, died instantly. One of the wounded, Ramrod doorman Jorg Wenz, a Dutch immigrant, died the following morning at St. Vincent's Hospital. Another patron inside the Ramrod was injured, as were two standing outside the bar. Crumpley shot at a man in front of Sneakers, another gay bar which shared the blockfront with Ramrod, then shot and wounded two more men at Greenwich and 10th Streets. Upon police arrival, Crumpley fled in his father's car and later hid under a truck, where he was arrested. 50 gunshots were fired in total, 40 at the gay bars and 10 at various pedestrians while on foot.

Besides the six wounded by shooting, two NYPD officers, Louis Troche and Paul Warren of the 13th Precinct, sustained minor injuries while chasing after Crumpley, when their cruiser collided with a passing car on 12th Street.

The day after the shooting, Crumpley told police, referring to gay people, "I'll kill them all, they ruin everything."

== Victims ==
=== Killed ===
- Vernon Kroening, 32
- Jorg Wenz, 24, shot in the stomach

=== Injured ===
- Olaf Gravesen, 37, shot in the arm
- John Litaker, 36, shot in the shoulder
- John Gamrecki, 27, shot in the hand
- Thomas Ron, 57, shot in the shoulder
- Richard Huff, 30, shot in the shoulder
- Rene Matute, 23, shot in the leg, shoulder and buttocks

== Perpetrator ==
Ronald K. Crumpley was born on January 26, 1942, the son of an African American minister in Harlem. He was employed as an officer of the New York City Transit Authority police between May 1965 and December 1973 when he resigned following a conviction for stealing credit cards. Due to a plea deal, he was charged with a lesser charge that resulted in no prison time. At the time of the shooting, he was unemployed, having last worked as a truck driver, and lived in Greenwich Village with his wife and two children.

Crumpley claimed after the shooting that he was dismayed by the interest gay men he knew had shown in him. When his father reacted to his homophobia by commenting that he "had a homosexual problem himself," Crumpley apparently suffered a breakdown. He was believed to have already suffered from mental issues due to drug abuse.

Crumpley justified his murders based on his religious beliefs, believing that gay men were instruments of the Devil and were trying to "steal my soul just by looking at me." In 1981, he was charged with murder, attempted murder and illegal possession of weapons, but found not guilty by reason of insanity and put in a mental facility. He unsuccessfully petitioned for release in 1999. In 2001, he had a competency hearing, claiming he was now sane, but displayed homophobia during the court proceedings. Crumpley remained incarcerated in mental institutions. Crumpley died while incarcerated on Wards Island in New York, on April 30, 2015, at the age of 73.

== Aftermath ==
Two days after the shooting, over 2,000 residents of Greenwich Village protested the shooting, simultaneously holding a candlelight vigil as a memorial. Spokesperson Andy Humm stated that New York City had "a poisoned atmosphere" in regards to its LGBT population.
