= Marion Freschl =

American operatic contralto and voice teacher

Marion Freschl (née Szekely) (January 16, 1896, Zvolen - November 23, 1984, New York City) was an American operatic contralto and voice teacher of Hungarian descent. A member of the voice faculties at the Curtis Institute of Music and the Juilliard School, she taught several highly successful singers, including Marian Anderson, Joan La Barbara, Brenda Lewis, Joanna Simon, Shirley Verrett, and Camilla Williams.

Both Freschl and her brother, baritone and voice teacher Rudolph Szekely, were trained at the Franz Liszt Academy of Music and began their careers as resident artists at the Hungarian State Opera House. She went on to sing leading roles at opera houses in Germany, Austria and Scandinavia before immigrating to the United States in 1941. In the 1920s she was active with the Berlin State Opera.

Freschl played an instrumental role in getting African-American soprano Camilla Williams an audition for the New York City Opera (NYCO) at a time when no major opera companies in United States history had ever hired a black performer. Freschl called NYCO director Laszlo Halasz in order to get Williams an opportunity to be heard. Halasz stated in 1966 interview about this phone call, "It wasn't so much as a request, but an order." The result of the audition led to Williams being the first African-American to be given a long-term contract with an opera company in the United States in 1946.
