= Ramrod (New York City) =

Former sex club in New York City

The Ramrod

General information
- Type: Gay leather bar
- Location: Greenwich Village, Manhattan, New York City, 394–396 West Street, United States
- Coordinates: 40°43′59″N 74°0′36″W
- Opened: 1960
- Closed: 1986

The Ramrod was a gay leather bar at 394–395 West Street in the Greenwich Village neighborhood of Manhattan in New York City. It operated from 1960 to 1986.

The bar became known as the site of the 1980 West Street Massacre, in which two people were killed and five others injured in a homophobic mass shooting.

== History ==
Located at the Hudson River, the building was constructed around 1848. The Ramrod was opened in 1960, originally as the Sea Shell Tavern, a seamen-oriented bar. The establishment operated under both names between 1973 and 1975.

=== West Street Massacre ===
On November 19, 1980, Ronald K. Crumpley, a former law enforcement officer of the NYC Transit Authority, started shooting indiscriminately at gay men in the Greenwich Village neighborhood with two stolen handguns just before 11 pm. Crumpley first shot and wounded two men outside a delicatessen located on the corner of Washington and 10th Streets, but they survived by eluding him by hiding behind parked cars. The Ramrod was two blocks away, located between 10th and Christopher Streets, sharing the blockfront with another gay bar called "Sneakers."

The New York Times headline for the story of the shooting was entitled "West Street Massacre."

Armed with an Uzi submachinegun outfitted with a 40-round magazine, Crumpley fired into the line of people waiting to go into the Ramrod and shot through its window, hitting four people. Vernon Kroening, an organist at the nearby St. Joseph's Roman Catholic Church, died immediately. Four others were wounded, including Ramrod doorman Jorg Wenz, who died later that day at St. Vincent's Hospital. Two Ramrod patrons standing outside the bar were wounded as was another patron on the inside. After shooting a man inside Sneakers, Crumpley moved on, shooting and wounding two more men at Greenwich and 10th streets, where he was arrested."

The day after the shooting, Crumpley said, "I’ll kill them all — the gays — they ruin everything."

A 38-year-old African American, Crumpley had been dismissed from the Transit Authority for stealing credit cards. The homophobic married father of two claimed after the shooting that he was dismayed by the interest gay men he knew supposedly had in him.

A minister's son, Crumpley justified his murders based on his religious beliefs, believing that gay men were instruments of the Devil and were "trying to steal my soul just by looking at me." He was found not guilty by reason of insanity and put in a mental facility. In 2001, he had a competency hearing, claiming he was now sane, but displayed homophobia during the court proceedings. Crumpley remained incarcerated in mental institutions, dying in April 2015 at the age of 73.

== Other Ramrod bars ==
The New York Ramrod closed down in 1986. Since then, multiple gay leather bars named Ramrod have opened. Much like bars that use the name "Eagle," these other Ramrod bars have operated as independent businesses, and are not managed by a single corporate entity in the manner of a franchise or chain store.

A Ramrod bar operated in Boston from 1981 to 2020. In 1994, a Ramrod opened in Fort Lauderdale, Florida.

== See also ==
- The Anvil (gay club)
- Continental Baths
- Mineshaft (gay club)
- LGBT culture in New York City
- List of LGBTQ bars
