= Gerald Walker (writer) =

US magazine editor and writer (1928–2004)

- Born: April 16, 1928; United States
- Died: February 19, 2004 (aged 75); Manhattan, New York City, New York, U.S.
- Occupations: Writer, editor, author
- Spouse(s): Greta Markson (divorced) Joanna Simon (m. 1976)
- Children: 1
- Writing career
- Language: English
- Genres: Fiction, journalism
- Notable work: Cruising

Gerald Robert Walker (April 16, 1928 – February 19, 2004) was an American magazine editor for The New York Times Magazine who was known for writing the 1970 novel Cruising, which was adapted into the controversial 1980 film of the same name directed by William Friedkin and starring Al Pacino.

== Biography ==
Walker was born on April 16, 1928. He graduated from New York University and earned a Master of Fine Arts in theatre at Columbia University.

Walker worked as an articles editor for The New York Times Magazine from 1963 to 1990. Walker also compiled an annual anthology titled Best Magazine Articles from 1965 to 1967. At the time of his death, Walker was completing a mystery novel titled Witnesses.

Walker was married to Greta Markson, with whom he had a son, David, but their marriage ended in divorce. From 1976 to the time of his death, Walker was married to Joanna Simon.

On February 19, 2004, Walker died of stroke complications at New York Presbyterian Hospital in Manhattan.
