= Cruising (novel) =

1970 novel by Gerald Walker

- First edition cover
- Author: Gerald Walker
- Language: English
- Genre: Crime novel
- Publisher: Stein and Day
- Publication date: 1970
- Publication place: United States
- Media type: Print (Hardback)
- Pages: 192
- ISBN: 978-0-8128-1323-4
- OCLC: 89443
- Dewey Decimal: 813/.5/4
- LC Class: PZ4.W1782 Cr PS3573

Cruising is a novel written by The New York Times reporter Gerald Walker and published in 1970. The novel is about an undercover police officer looking for a homosexual serial killer in the gay sections of New York City in 1970. The murder victims were closeted or relatively open (as open as they could be at the time) men who came across the killer while cruising for sex. While undercover, the police officer develops feelings for his gay neighbor.

The novel is notable for its discussion of gay themes at a time when that was not commonplace. Joseph Hansen was one other writer of the 1970s to incorporate queerness into his crime fiction with his Brandstetter detective series. The first emergence of gay crime fiction was owed to George Baxt, who wrote about the gay detective Pharaoh Love. Hansen, Nava, Zubro and Nathan Aldyne (a pseudonym for Michael McDowell and Dennis Schuetz) were authors of crime fiction who also incorporated gay themes into their writing in the 1970s and 1980s, around the time Gerald Walker had written this novel. Neil Placky presents the view "Their books opened doors into gay culture at a time when homosexuality was considered a psychiatric disorder and a sure way to break a mother's heart". Cruising explores the main character's identity as an undercover officer and the internal struggle he then faces by entering the subculture of the gay community as a key point of the plot. The novel's plot displays the varying attitudes toward the emerging gay community. In a review published in The Guardian, a year after publication, the reviewer says "Cruising was Gerald Walker's first novel. It took five years to write [...] and of course was turned down by six literary agents and no less than 18 publishers".

== Plot ==
The novel focuses on three main characters: killer Stuart Richards, undercover police officer John Lynch, and fellow police officer Captain Edelson, who assigns the undercover role to Lynch. Each chapter (20 in total) focuses on one of the character's thoughts. Focus is placed on Lynch's feelings about various minority groups, including gay men and his feelings related to working undercover and how his life is changing as the job progresses. Additional focus is Richards' various heterosexual exploits, his rocky relationship with his father and many more memories of his life, both past and current, and Edelson's thoughts on the case and how he hopes it will garner him a promotion if he solves it.

== Film adaptation ==
The novel was adapted as a 1980 film, also titled Cruising. There were substantial changes to the plot of the film, such as moving the killer into the world of sadomasochism and leather gay bars in Greenwich Village, New York. The movie includes police officer Steve Burns (his name was changed from John Lynch) having an active sexual relationship with his girlfriend Nancy (played by Karen Allen). Neither of these facets is part of the plot of the novel. The film starred Al Pacino and was directed by William Friedkin.
