= Bert Schneider =

American film and television producer (1933–2011)

- Schneider, c. 1970
- Born: Berton Jerome Schneider; May 5, 1933; New York City, U.S.
- Died: December 12, 2011 (aged 78); Los Angeles, California, U.S.
- Education: Cornell University
- Spouse(s): Judith Feinberg (divorced); three subsequent marriages
- Children: 2
- Parent: Abraham Schneider

Berton "Bert" Jerome Schneider (May 5, 1933 – December 12, 2011) was an American film and television producer.

He was responsible for several topical films of the late 1960s and early 1970s, including the road film Easy Rider (1969), directed by Dennis Hopper.

== Early life and education ==
Schneider was born to a wealthy Jewish family in New York City and raised in New Rochelle, New York. His father was Abraham Schneider (1905-1993), who succeeded Harry Cohn as the president of Columbia Pictures. He was the middle of three brothers, the younger Harold and the elder Stanley. Schneider tended toward the rebellious politics of the day. Briefly a student at Cornell University, located in Ithaca, New York, he was ultimately expelled.

His brother, Harold Schneider, also became a film producer.

== Career ==
In 1953, he worked for Screen Gems, Columbia's television division in Los Angeles. In 1965, Schneider formed a partnership with the film director Bob Rafelson, creating Raybert Productions. The duo brought to television The Monkees (1966–1968), a situation comedy about a fictional rock band (who became a real group, The Monkees, to meet public demand, and their own aspirations).

The success of The Monkees allowed Schneider and Rafelson to break into feature films, first with the counterculture film Head (1968), starring The Monkees, directed by Rafelson and featuring a screenplay co-written by Rafelson and Jack Nicholson. The film bombed in its initial release due to poor distribution and the lack of a target audience for 1968. Monkees fans were disappointed that the disjointed, stream-of-consciousness ring of stories was not just an expanded episode. Art film enthusiasts may have embraced its creativity but were not interested in a film by the "pre-fab four." In recent years, the film has received above average reviews from critics and fans alike as an interesting 1960s period piece.

They had their first major success with Easy Rider (1969), which ushered in the era of New Hollywood. Then followed with the drama film Five Easy Pieces (1970), which Rafelson directed. Following Five Easy Pieces, Schneider and Rafelson added a partner, Stephen Blauner, and Raybert turned into BBS Productions.

They subsequently made a series of films, including the drama films The Last Picture Show (1971), directed by Peter Bogdanovich and The King of Marvin Gardens (1972), directed by Rafelson. In 1975 he was a member of the jury at the 9th Moscow International Film Festival.

By the 1980s, Schneider was on his way out from Hollywood, with studios regaining control of what they believed the public wanted. By the 1990s, he was described as a "recluse", with film critic Patrick Goldstein (who described him as both gifted and self-destructive) stating, "I’d see him at parties, toting a plastic baggie full of pharmaceuticals of all stripes and sizes, hanging out with women who weren’t even born when “Easy Rider” was taking the town by storm."

=== Academy Award controversy ===
In 1975, Schneider received an Academy Award for Best Documentary Feature for producing Hearts and Minds (1974), a documentary film about the Vietnam War, directed by Peter Davis. His acceptance speech was one of the most politically controversial in the ceremony's history. Schneider's speech included this statement: "It’s ironic that we’re here at a time just before Vietnam is about to be liberated." He then read a telegram from the head of the North Vietnamese delegation to the Paris peace talks. It thanked the antiwar movement "for all they have done on behalf of peace. Greetings of friendship to all American people." After receiving thousands of angry telegrams backstage, Frank Sinatra appeared later in the show to read a disclaimer that disavowed Schneider's statement, which in turn provoked angry responses from actors Shirley MacLaine and Warren Beatty. Beatty later berated Sinatra on stage, calling him "you old Republican."

== Personal life ==
In 1954, he married his first wife, Judy Feinberg (born 1936), who was also Jewish and from a wealthy family. They had two children: Jeffrey and Audrey. They later divorced and he was subsequently married three more times.

Between 1971 and 1974 Schneider had a relationship with Candice Bergen. Bergen wrote about their relationship in her first memoir, 'Knock Wood', referring to Schneider under the pseudonym "Robin".

== Death ==
In 2011, Schneider died of natural causes, aged 78, in Los Angeles, California.

== In popular culture ==
Peter Fonda based his character Terry Valentine in the crime film The Limey (1999) partly on Schneider, according to Fonda's interview on the film's DVD.

The Big Cigar, a 2024 biographical drama thriller miniseries developed by Jim Hecht, based on the 2012 Playboy article of the same name by Joshuah Bearman, follows Black Panther Party founder Huey P. Newton escaping the FBI to Cuba with the help of Schneider. Schneider is portrayed by Alessandro Nivola.

== Television work ==
Year	Title	Genre	Notes
1966–1968	The Monkees	television situation comedy	

== Filmography ==
Year	Title	Genre	Notes
1968	Head		
1969	Easy Rider	road film	producer
1970	Five Easy Pieces	drama film	
1971	The Last Picture Show	drama film	
1971	Drive, He Said	drama film	
1971	A Safe Place	drama film	
1972	The King of Marvin Gardens	drama film	
1974	Hearts and Minds	documentary film	
1977	Tracks	drama film	
1978	Days of Heaven	drama film	
1981	Broken English	drama film	

== See also ==
- List of Cornell University alumni
- List of film producers
- List of people from Los Angeles
- List of people from New York City
- List of television producers
