= Stephen Blauner =

American film producer (1933–2015)

Jules Stephen Blauner (September 19, 1933 – June 16, 2015), commonly known as Steve Blauner, was Bobby Darin's manager, producer, and member of BBS Productions.

== Life and career ==
He was born to Eugene and Marion Blauner on September 19, 1933. At the time of his birth, Blauner's parents had settled in New York City and he was born on 81st St. in Elmhurst Hospital. While in kindergarten, the family moved to White Plains, New York where he met childhood friend and future collaborator Bert Schneider. After watching The Jolson Story (1946) on numerous occasions, Blauner developed a love for the entertainment business that he would soon pursue. While Blauner was serving in the air force, he visited the Copacabana nightclub in New York City where Sammy Davis Jr. was performing. Blauner idolized Davis and said to the singer, "The way you feel about Frank Sinatra is the way I feel about you". After Blauner completed his time in the military, he and Davis became very good friends. Blauner's first job in the entertainment business was as an agent at GAC, at that time the third largest booking agency in the world. He met with Harriet Wasser and soon discovered singer-songwriter Bobby Darin.

Blauner had almost no experience in management, but he signed Darin with GAC. His first action in management was a Connecticut concert that assured him Darin would become a success. Later, after he left GAC, he asked Darin if he still wanted him to be his manager. Bobby Darin agreed and Blauner maintained his position as Darin's official manager until 1965. During this time, Bert Schneider became vice president and treasurer of Screen Gems and after Darin had received his Best Supporting Actor Oscar nomination for his role in Captain Newman, M.D. (1963), the two men severed their professional connection, but remained friends. Blauner often referred to his management period with Darin as a "comet ride".

Blauner soon began to work for Screen Gems and worked on TV sitcoms such as Bewitched, I Dream of Jeannie, The Farmer’s Daughter, Hazel and The Monkees. Blauner formed BBS with producers Bert Schenider and Bob Rafelson and during that time, the company produced the Academy-Award-winning documentary Hearts and Minds (1974), and "New Hollywood" films Five Easy Pieces (1970), The Last Picture Show (1971), The King of Marvin Gardens (1972), and A Safe Place (1971). Blauner continued to represent the Bobby Darin estate for the rest of his life.

Blauner himself appeared in a few videotaped comedy "blackout" sketches for television comedian Ernie Kovacs during the early 1960s. One sketch was entitled "Whom Dunnit", where Blauner played a dimwitted panelist wearing a "Beany Copter" hat and sweatshirt emblazoned with the word "Trenton" (which was a mocking reference by Kovacs to his hometown of Trenton, New Jersey).

== In popular media ==
Stephen Blauner was portrayed by John Goodman in the 2004 Bobby Darin biopic Beyond the Sea.

Stephen Blauner was portrayed by P. J. Byrne in the 2024 television miniseries The Big Cigar.

== Death ==
He died on June 16, 2015, from complications of a broken hip.
