= The Big Cigar =

Apple TV+ miniseries from 2024

- Genre: Biographical drama; Thriller
- Based on: "The Big Cigar" by Joshuah Bearman
- Developed by: Jim Hecht
- Directed by: Don Cheadle; Damon Thomas; Tiffany Johnson
- Starring: André Holland; Alessandro Nivola; Tiffany Boone; P. J. Byrne; Marc Menchaca
- Composer: Robert Glasper
- Countries of origin: United States; Canada (Note: Sources differ regarding the country or countries of origin. Some indicate that the United States is the sole country of origin, while others list it as a co-production of the United States and Canada.)
- Original language: English
- No. of episodes: 6

Production
- Executive producers: Janine Sherman Barrois; Joshuah Bearman; Don Cheadle; Joshua Davis; Jim Hecht; Arthur Spector; Laurence Andries (Note: co-executive); Gwendolyn M. Parker; Ben Rosenblatt; Valerie C. Woods
- Producers: Dan Kaplow; Adam Ben Frank; Joshua Levey (Note: supervising producer)
- Production locations: Toronto, Ontario; Hamilton, Ontario
- Cinematography: Suki Medencevic; Mirosław Baszak; Carmen Cabana
- Editors: John Peter Bernardo; Avril Beukes; Kyle Bond; Rebecca Valente
- Running time: 37-41 minutes
- Production companies: Epic; Jim Hecht Productions; Folding Chair Productions; Warner Bros. Television

Original release
- Network: Apple TV+
- Release: May 17 – June 14, 2024

The Big Cigar is a 2024 biographical drama television miniseries developed by Jim Hecht, based on the 2012 Playboy article of the same name by Joshuah Bearman. Following the events of the Black Panther Party in 1970s, the series is about party founder Huey P. Newton escaping from the Federal Bureau of Investigation (FBI) to Cuba with the help of Bert Schneider for an elaborate plan.

The miniseries stars André Holland, Alessandro Nivola, Tiffany Boone, P. J. Byrne, and Marc Menchaca. The Big Cigar premiered its first two episodes on Apple TV+ on May 17, 2024, and received generally positive reviews from critics. The series concluded on June 14, 2024.

== Premise ==
Set in 1974, the series chronicles the manhunt for Huey P. Newton, the founder of the Black Panther Party, who seeks the help of film producer Bert Schneider as he tries to escape to Cuba.

== Cast ==
=== Main ===
- André Holland as Huey P. Newton: The main protagonist, who is the founder of The Black Panther Party.
- Alessandro Nivola as Bert Schneider: The film and television producer. He and his business partner Steve Blauner hid Newton due to him being convicted of murder and assault.
- Tiffany Boone as Gwen Fontaine: The wife of Huey P. Newton who is a party member.
- P. J. Byrne as Stephen Blauner: Bert's business partner and childhood friend. He and Bert helped and collaborated with Huey on a series of wild schemes.
- Marc Menchaca as Sydney Clark: An FBI agent dressed as a hippie who never gives up interrogating the organization, family members and anybody related to Huey.

=== Recurring ===
- Thamela Mpumlwana as Lil Bobby Hutton
- Moses Ingram as Teressa Dixon: A young member of the party who proves to be resourceful, even when she persuades Huey to give Bert his money.
- Jaime Ray Newman as Roz Torrance
- Jordane Christie as Bobby Seale: A political activist and author who was one of the co-founders of the Black Panther Party along with Newton.
- Inny Clemons as Richard Pryor
- Olli Haaskivi as Arthur A. Ross: A film and screenwriter who works for Bert.
- Noah Emmerich as Stanley Schneider: Bert's brother.
- James Cade as Agent Anderson

=== Guest ===
- Glynn Turman as Walter Newton: Huey P. Newton's father
- Brenton Allen as Eldridge Cleaver: A writer and political activist who an early leader of the Black Panther Party.
- Michael Mașini as Gregory Lipton:
- Chris Brochu as Dennis Hopper
- Rebecca Dalton as Jessica
- John Doman as Abe Schneider: Bert's father.
- Owen Roth as Jack Nicholson
- Manuel Rodriguez Saenz as Tajo
- Hudson Wurster as Michael Torrance
- Al McFoster as Ceddy
- Taylor Jackson as Candice Bergen
- Liz Adjei as Betty Shabazz
- Brian Jansen as Warren Winkle

== Episodes ==
No.	Title	Directed by	Teleplay by	Original release date
1	"Panther/Producer"	Don Cheadle	Jim Hecht	May 17, 2024
Huey P. Newton, who co-founded the Black Panther Party in 1966, was convicted of allegedly murdering a police officer in 1968, but was released around two years later, was again targeted by the FBI in 1974 for a deadly violent crime. On his escape from the investigators, the African-American activist turns to Hollywood producer Bert Schneider, who has supported him and his movement for some time. Huey and his partner Gwen Fontaine find shelter with Schneider's business partner Steve Blauner for the time being. Since the search pressure is constantly increasing, Huey decides to flee to Cuba.
2	"The Cuban"	Don Cheadle	Janine Sherman Barrois & Jim Hecht	May 17, 2024
Preparations for a crazy escape plan begin. Under the pretense of making a film called "The Big Cigar", Bert wants to smuggle his friend Huey to Cuba. Steve is skeptical about the risky venture. Not least because he fears for his existence. It soon becomes apparent that not all of the people involved are reliable. Flashbacks illuminate the disputes within the Black Panther Party, which primarily revolve around the question of the use of weapons.
3	"Guns & Matzah"	Damon Thomas	Laurence Andries & Gwendolyn M. Parker	May 24, 2024
After the pilot they bought fails, Bert and Huey come up with a new plan. The FBI is closing in on the Black Panther Party co-founder. Schneider approaches his brother Stanley, who runs Columbia Pictures, with a request. There's a fight between Bert and Steve. In a diner, the complications take a bloody course. Flashbacks reveal Huey's growing paranoia.
4	"What Are Friends For?"	Damon Thomas	Janine Sherman Barrois & Jim Hecht	May 31, 2024
After the diner shooting, Bert fears the worst, but is relieved when things turn out a little differently. The excitement does not bode well for the plan to take Huey to Cuba from Los Angeles on a private plane. Because the FBI in the form of Agent Sydney Clark comes to the correct conclusions he is now more vigilant than ever. When Schneider loses focus while searching for a getaway car, Steve makes an unexpected decision. A year earlier, Huey let his friend and party co-founder Bobby Seale know what he thought of his political ambitions.
5	"Lost Paradise"	Tiffany Johnson	Laurence Andries & Valerie C. Woods & Ameer Hasan	June 7, 2024
After he and Steve escape to Mexico, Huey is supposed to hide in a port city for some time. Huey doesn't like this idea at all. The fear of being caught is omnipresent and devastating news doesn't take long to arrive. Bert struggles with feelings of guilt and is also visited by fate. Agent Clark goes his own way. Flashbacks reveal the background to Huey's escape from Oakland.
6	"The Pirate"	Tiffany Johnson	Jim Hecht & Joshuah Bearman	June 14, 2024
Huey, his partner Gwen Fontaine and Steve appear to be trapped, then the tide turns. Once again a plan has to be thrown overboard. Bert becomes more involved in the Black Panther Party co-founder's escape but is met with suspicion. With support, Agent Clark comes closer to his big goal. Will Huey still make it safely to the coast of Cuba? Series Finale.

== Production ==
It was announced in December 2012 that Jonathan Dayton and Valerie Faris were set to direct the project for Sony Pictures, at the time developed as a film, with Joshuah Bearman, author of the source article, and Jim Hecht set to write the screenplay.

The project, now a miniseries, was given a greenlight from Apple TV+ in April 2022, with André Holland cast to star. Don Cheadle was announced to be directing the first two episodes in addition to executive producing. In June, Tiffany Boone and Alessandro Nivola joined the cast, with Marc Menchaca and P. J. Byrne joining the next month. In August, Jordane Christie, Moses Ingram, Olli Haaskivi and Glynn Turman were cast to recur in the series. Additional recurring cast including Jaime Ray Newman and Noah Emmerich was announced in September.

Filming for the series began in Toronto in June 2022, as revealed by showrunner Janine Sherman Barrois. By August, production was occurring throughout Hamilton, Ontario, where Hamilton City Hall was being used as a double for San Francisco International Airport.

== Reception ==
On review aggregator Rotten Tomatoes, the series holds an approval rating of 72% with an average rating of 6.5/10, based on 29 reviews. The website's critics consensus reads, "A magnetic performance from André Holland gets The Big Cigar close to lighting up, but a lack of narrative focus slightly dampens the spark." On Metacritic, which uses a weighted average, assigned a score of 61 out of 100, based on 18 critics, indicating "generally favorable reviews".

Judy Berman of Time Magazine gave a favorable review and wrote, "That Newton's wariness of mass culture frames the story from the very beginning is a sign that viewers are in for something much smarter, bolder, and more challenging than the entertainment industry's typical, sanitized take on radical politics". On Variety, author Aramide Tinubu wrote that, "André Holland is stellar as Huey P. Newton, but 'The Big Cigar' never ignites". Elisa Guimaraes of Collider gave the series 3 out of 4 stars. She praised Holland for his depiction of Huey P. Newton. The Guardian writer Ellen E. Jones also gave the show a 3 out of 5 star rating. She criticized "that Hollywood can't be trusted to tell the stories of Black radicals." Richard Roeper from the Chicago Sun-Times wrote a favorable review about the actor André Holland stating that he "does a brilliant job of capturing the complicated and charismatic Black Panthers co-founder". Nadir Samara from Screen Rant gave the series an average review of a 3 out of 5 stars, stating that the series is decent but criticized the script due to it being "all over the place, neither the story nor the performance hit their peaks". Rory Doherty from Paste Magazine wrote that the series "is a slick caper that only superficially grasps its history lesson".
