= Blood and Wine =

- Theatrical release poster
- Directed by: Bob Rafelson
- Screenplay by: Nick Villiers; Alison Cross
- Story by: Nick Villiers; Bob Rafelson
- Produced by: Jeremy Thomas
- Starring: Jack Nicholson; Stephen Dorff; Jennifer Lopez; Judy Davis; Michael Caine
- Cinematography: Newton Thomas Sigel
- Edited by: Steven Cohen
- Music by: Michał Lorenc
- Production company: Recorded Picture Company
- Distributed by: Fox Searchlight Pictures
- Release dates: September 19, 1996 (San Sebastián); February 21, 1997 (United States)
- Running time: 101 minutes
- Country: United States
- Language: English
- Budget: $26 million
- Box office: $1.1 million

Blood and Wine is a 1996 American neo-noir crime thriller film directed by Bob Rafelson and starring Jack Nicholson, Stephen Dorff, Jennifer Lopez, Judy Davis, and Michael Caine. The screenplay was written by Nick Villiers and Alison Cross. Rafelson has stated that the film forms the final part of his unofficial trilogy with Nicholson, with whom he made Five Easy Pieces and The King of Marvin Gardens in the 1970s.

== Plot ==
Alex Gates is a Miami wine merchant who has distanced himself from his wife Suzanne with his philandering, and from his stepson Jason with his indifference. Suzanne is recovering from breaking her ankle after falling downstairs while drunk. Heavily in debt, Alex hatches a plan to steal a valuable diamond necklace from the house of his clients, the Reese family, where his Cuban mistress Gabriela works. He cases the house during a wine delivery with Jason, who works in Alex's business. Jason becomes attracted to Gabriela, unaware of her relationship with his stepfather.

On the day of the heist, Alex and his partner Victor, a British safe-cracker, arrive at the house under the pretense that the Reeses' wine cellar needs repairs. Gabriela was supposed to let them in, but she was fired the day before. Fortunately, Alex had cultivated a relationship with the security guard and is able to convince him to let them inside. Victor sends Alex and the guard off on an errand while he works on the safe, but a second guard becomes suspicious, although Victor is able to complete the job before being discovered.

The pair decide that Alex will pawn the necklace in New York City, and he invites Gabriela to go with him. As he is packing, Suzanne happens upon his airline tickets and immediately realizes he is having another affair. The two get into a physical altercation and Suzanne knocks him out with her walking stick. Panicking, she empties out his suitcase, where he has hidden the necklace, and uses it for her own clothing. Suzanne and Jason flee to the Florida Keys. Upon arriving, they discover the necklace, but Suzanne doesn't want to keep it. Jason has it appraised and discovers it is worth $1 million. He also visits Gabriela back in Miami, giving her the phone number of the place where they are staying.

Alex and Victor visit Jason's friend Henry in an attempt to learn his whereabouts. Victor, who is dying of tuberculosis and determined to profit from the heist, assaults Henry before Alex realizes he doesn't know anything. The pair contact various jewelers to be on the lookout for the necklace and get a report from Jason's appraiser. Arriving in Key Largo, Victor pretends to flirt with Suzanne, but Jason, who has gotten a description of Henry's assailant, realizes who he is. After a fight, Jason flees with his mother in their car. Alex and Victor give chase and cause an accident that kills Suzanne. Although injured, Jason discharges himself from the hospital and returns to Miami to kill Alex, only to find Gabriela in his bed. After a brief argument, the two reconcile.

Alex discovers Jason and Gabriela the next morning, accusing her of sleeping with his stepson. Victor confronts Jason, who tricks him into thinking that he has returned the necklace to Alex. Victor goes to Alex's house and attacks him before collapsing from exhaustion, whereupon Alex smothers Victor with a pillow. Jason returns to find Victor floating in the pool. Searching his pockets, he finds the photo of Alex holding the pilfered necklace. That night, Jason shows the necklace to Gabriela and confesses that he used one stone to help buy a cabin cruiser from his friend, Henry. The next day, she calls Alex and they search Jason's boat, but Jason, anticipating this, confronts them and he and Alex fight.

Eventually, Jason crushes Alex between the boat and the dock, severely injuring him, before fleeing the scene. Gabriela, who had fled with the necklace, returns and leaves it with Alex, insisting that she doesn't want it, but takes one of the diamonds before she leaves. With an ambulance and the police on the way, a defeated Alex realizes he has no choice but to dispose of the necklace and throws it into the ocean. Unbeknownst to him, Jason has hidden the incriminating photo in a travel bag that the police will certainly search. The film ends with Jason, alone on the boat, sailing off into the setting sun on the horizon.

== Cast ==
- Jack Nicholson as Alex Gates
- Stephen Dorff as Jason
- Jennifer Lopez as Gabriela
- Judy Davis as Suzanne Gates
- Michael Caine as Victor Spansky
- Harold Perrineau Jr. as Henry
- Robyn Peterson as Dina Reese
- Mike Starr as Mike
- John Seitz as Frank Reese
- Marc Macaulay as guard
- Dan Daily as Todd
- Marta Velasco as Gabriela's cousin

== Production ==
British producer Jeremy Thomas was attracted to work with Rafelson due to what he perceived as the director's European sensibilities. He later remembered:

It was a different experience for me, because growing up as an independent producer it was difficult to interact with a corporate system. But then I got this screenplay which had Jack Nicholson attached to it and Bob Rafelson, who I knew quite well, and so I thought, I had never gone near a genre-type of film and so maybe I will try some noir-ish sort of film, set in Miami, which is the flavour of Hollywood, and see if we can do it. It was certainly an incredible cast, and I sold the film to 20th Century Fox, and I had a moment of flirtation with a studio movie type of film. I am very fond of the film.

Blood and Wine was shot in Miami, South Florida and the Florida Keys, including some scenes at the Caribbean Club in Key Largo. Alex's family home is located in the Coral Gables/Pinecrest area. Gabriela is shown to live in Little Havana. The Reeses live in Millionaire's Row in Miami Beach. Their house is next to Indian Creek and has a view of Collins Avenue. Jason's fishing boat is anchored in the Miami River, near Downtown Miami. Before the dance scene between Alex and Gabriela, we see a view of Southeast Financial Center in Downtown Miami.

Michael Caine has stated that he thought he was retired until Jack Nicholson mentioned that he was making Blood and Wine, which included an excellent part for Caine. Caine agreed to join the cast and went on to continue his very successful career.

== Reception ==
Rotten Tomatoes, a review aggregator, reports that 63% of 32 surveyed critics gave the film a positive review; the average rating is 6.1/10. Audiences polled by CinemaScore gave the film an average grade of "C" on an A+ to F scale.

David Rooney of Variety called it "an amusingly caustic, straight-up serving of film noir staples spiced with star charisma". Film critic Roger Ebert wrote, "Blood & Wine is a richly textured crime picture based on the personalities of men who make their living desperately. Jack Nicholson and Michael Caine are the stars, as partners in a jewel theft that goes wrong in a number of ways, each way illustrating deep flaws in how they choose to live." Edward Guthmann of the San Francisco Chronicle rated it 2/4 stars and wrote, "Blood & Wine has elements of classic film noir – but it's film noir with a sledgehammer and none of the genre's suggestiveness or style."

Caine won Best Actor at the San Sebastian International Film Festival.
