= Beyond the Sea (2004 film) =

2004 biographical musical drama film by Kevin Spacey

- Theatrical release poster
- Directed by: Kevin Spacey
- Written by: Lewis Colick; Kevin Spacey
- Produced by: Kevin Spacey; Phillip Barry; Dana Brunetti; Arthur Friedman; Jan Fantl; Andy Paterson
- Starring: Kevin Spacey; Kate Bosworth; John Goodman; Bob Hoskins
- Cinematography: Eduardo Serra
- Edited by: Trevor Waite
- Music by: Bobby Darin
- Production company: Trigger Street Productions
- Distributed by: Lions Gate Films
- Release date: December 17, 2004
- Running time: 118 minutes
- Country: United States
- Language: English
- Budget: $25 million
- Box office: $8.4 million

Beyond the Sea is a 2004 American biographical film based on the life of singer-actor Bobby Darin. Starring in the lead role and using his own singing voice for the musical numbers, Kevin Spacey co-wrote, directed, and co-produced the film, which takes its title from Darin's song of the same title.

Beyond the Sea depicts Darin's rise to success in both the music and film industry during the 1950s and 1960s as well as his marriage to Sandra Dee, portrayed by Kate Bosworth.

As early as 1986, Barry Levinson intended to direct a film based on the life of Darin, and he began pre-production on the project in early 1997. When he eventually vacated the director's position, Spacey, along with Darin's son Dodd, acquired the film rights.

Filming for Beyond the Sea took place from November 2003 to January 2004. It was released by Lions Gate Films on December 17, 2004 to mixed reviews from critics and bombed at the box office. Dodd Darin, Sandra Dee and former Darin manager Steve Blauner responded with enthusiastic feedback to Spacey's work on the film. Despite a number of negative reviews, some critics praised Spacey's performance, largely because of his decision to use his own singing voice. He received a Golden Globe nomination.

== Plot ==
Rather than providing a straightforward biography, the film weaves fantasy sequences with scenes containing somewhat fictionalized accounts of events in Darin's life, and throughout it, the adult singer interacts with his younger self. It chronicles his determination to rise from his working-class roots as Walden Robert Cassotto, a frail boy from The Bronx plagued by multiple bouts of rheumatic fever, who becomes a singer more famous than Frank Sinatra. To achieve that goal, he forms a band and struggles to find gigs at any nightclub that will hire him.

His agent gets Darin a recording contract with Atlantic Records, where the singer enjoys teen idol success with "Splish Splash". Not wanting to limit his appeal to rock and roll audiences, he changes his niche to big band singing and recording major hits, such as "Mack the Knife". To capitalize on his popularity with teenage and young adult audiences, Darin is cast in Come September opposite Sandra Dee. He falls in love with the 18-year-old actress; determined to marry her, he romantically seduces and enchants her with songs like "Beyond the Sea" and "Dream Lover". They elope, angering her mother. Darin finally realizes his own mother's dream when he is signed to appear at the famed Copacabana nightclub in Manhattan.

As success takes him on the road and away from home, Dee begins to drink heavily, and the couple fights frequently. Eventually, they separate and later reconcile. She gives birth to a son, Dodd. To his actress wife's chagrin, Darin is nominated for the Academy Award for Best Supporting Actor for his performance as a shell shocked soldier in Captain Newman, M.D.

In the late 1960s, Darin becomes involved in the campaign to elect Robert F. Kennedy for President and contemplates a political career of his own. His sister Nina, knowing his past will be investigated closely if Bobby opts to enter the political arena, shocks him with the news his beloved mother actually was his grandmother and that he is Nina's illegitimate child, the son of a father she cannot identify.

Devastated, Darin becomes a recluse living in a trailer on the Big Sur coast in California. He finds himself out of step with changing music trends, and when he tries to adapt by incorporating folk music and protest songs into his repertoire, he finds himself rejected by the audience that once embraced him. Undaunted, he stages a show, complete with a gospel choir, at the Flamingo Hotel in Las Vegas, and against all odds, it is a huge success.

However, his triumph is short-lived. Suffering from blood poisoning following surgery to repair his mechanical heart valve, Darin is rushed to the hospital, where he dies at the age of 37. Following his death, he meets the younger counterpart of himself once again, and the two duet with "As Long as I'm Singing".

== Cast ==
- Kevin Spacey as Bobby Darin, who rises from his lower-class roots to become one of the most popular rock and roll and big band performers of all time.
  - William Ullrich as Young Bobby.
- Kate Bosworth as Sandra Dee, the popular actress who marries Bobby. Although they divorced in 1967, Sandra said she always truly and deeply loved him and that she always would do so and thus never remarried.
- Bob Hoskins as Charlie Maffia, who serves as a father figure and considers Bobby to be his son.
- John Goodman as Stephen Blauner, Bobby's dedicated talent manager. Blauner later becomes a successful film producer with movies such as The King of Marvin Gardens (1972) and Drive, He Said (1971).
- Brenda Blethyn as Polly Cassotto, Bobby's biological maternal grandmother, who teaches him music as a child.
- Caroline Aaron as Nina Cassotto Maffia, Bobby's biological mother, whom he believed to be his older sister until she tells him the truth when he is 33.
- Greta Scacchi as Mary Douvan, Sandra's overprotective mother.
- Peter Cincotti as Dick Behrke, Bobby's arranger and pianist.
- Matt Rippy as David Gershenson, Bobby's publicist.

Cathy Moriarty-Gentile and Vanessa Redgrave were originally cast in Beyond the Sea, but both actresses dropped out for unspecified reasons.

== Development ==
=== Barry Levinson ===
Beginning in 1986, Barry Levinson intended to produce and direct a biopic based on the life of Darin with funding from his own production company, Baltimore Pictures. With writer Lewis Colick, Levinson pitched the idea to Warner Bros. Pictures, who agreed to co-finance The Bobby Darin Story and cover distribution duties. Producer Arthur Friedman, a fan of Darin's work, began to laboriously negotiate for crucial music licensing rights with Darin's ex-wife, Sandra Dee; his son, Dodd; and former manager Steve Blauner. Colick wrote the first draft in 1987 before Warner Bros. and Levinson commissioned rewrites from Paul Attanasio and Paul Schrader. Their scripts, which kept The Bobby Darin Story title, concentrated on Sandra Dee's alcoholism and childhood molestation by her stepfather. David Gershenson, Darin's longtime friend, publicist and manager, joined the project as a historical consultant. Tom Cruise was reportedly under consideration to portray Darin.

Meanwhile, in May 1994, Warner Bros. optioned Dodd Darin's book, Dream Lovers (ISBN 0-446-51768-2). James Toback and Lorenzo Carcaterra were hired to rewrite Attanasio's The Bobby Darin Story, which they retitled Dreamer in an attempt to incorporate the information present in Dodd Darin's Dream Lovers. Toback's script heavily focused on Darin's childhood rheumatic fever and lifelong struggle with heart disease. It also followed the previous Attanasio and Schrader scripts. Carcaterra's detailed research included Darin's music records, home videos, early television clips, authorized and unauthorized biographies, newspaper articles and magazine interviews. "I decided to meet with a lot of real-life people associated with Bobby Darin until [Levinson] said it was taking the focus off of Bobby," Carcaterra explained. As a result, some of the writer's favorite scenes, including a Las Vegas confrontation with Elvis Presley, were omitted from his third and final draft, which came in at a lengthy 164 pages.

Beginning in 1994, Kevin Spacey first offered his services to portray Bobby Darin, but the filmmakers believed the actor was too old. Around then, Spacey coincidentally performed the cover version of Darin's "That Old Black Magic" for the soundtrack of Midnight in the Garden of Good and Evil. The actor explained that after 1994, "at least three times a year, my manager would call over to Warner Bros. and say, 'Hey, what's happening with that Bobby Darin movie? You guys ever going to make it?'"

With filming to originally begin in late 1997, pre-production for Dreamer was commencing, and Levinson began to discuss the film with various actors, including Johnny Depp as Bobby Darin, Drew Barrymore as Sandra Dee, Bette Midler as Darin's birth mother Nina and Bruno Kirby as Nina's husband/Darin's right-hand man, Charlie Mafia. Levinson eventually vacated the director's position in favor of Liberty Heights (1999); because he was unable to get Dreamer into production, Warner Bros. lost the music licensing rights, which reverted to the Darin estate.

=== Kevin Spacey ===
In March 1999, Dick Clark Productions announced their teaming with Dodd Darin on a biopic, with collaboration from producer Arthur Friedman, who had been developing both The Bobby Darin Story and Dreamer with Levinson at Warner Bros. since 1986. Shortly afterwards, Spacey was in discussions with Dodd Darin to star in the lead role. Spacey was able to acquire the film rights from Warner Bros. in early 2000. With the help of Dodd Darin, the actor also received exclusive music rights for no charge. With his Academy Award-winning performance in American Beauty (1999) - which featured a number of Darin's songs, Paramount Pictures became interested in distributing/financing Beyond the Sea. The deal fell apart when Paramount told Spacey that he was too old for the role and instead wanted Leonardo DiCaprio. Beginning in October 2000, Spacey took vocal training lessons from Darin collaborator Roger Kellaway to give an accurate portrayal of the singer.

"Bobby was a man I found very compelling, driven, ambitious and complicated. He challenged himself and never sat back on his laurels. It's sad that he didn't live longer, but I don't think his life was tragic. I view his life as inspiring."
— Kevin Spacey

Spacey also kept close relations with the Darin family as a means to know he would treat the film "with respect." He sent letters to that effect to Sandra Dee and son Dodd. Steve Blauner (who is portrayed by John Goodman in the film) also served as a historical consultant. Dodd originally considered Spacey's plan to sing his father's material a sacrilege but eventually fell into sync with Spacey's deeply empathetic approach to Darin's life.

Tom Epperson, who had struck up a friendship with Spacey while writing an early screenplay draft of The Shipping News, was hired to write a new draft for Beyond the Sea. Epperson's script included Darin's penchant for orgies after his divorce with Sandra Dee. Spacey, finding the Epperson script to be overtly dark and morbid, began to rewrite Beyond the Sea, incorporating info from the 1987 Lewis Colick script. Spacey acknowledged he portrayed Darin too sympathetically and decided not to depict the darker side of Darin's life centrally. "The other scripts made Bobby [Darin] a rather unlikable figure," he explained. "I was not interested in making a conventional biopic, as you can see from the results. I was interested in making an exuberant celebration of an entertainer in a way that would be uplifting for an audience."

By making the biopic, Dodd Darin and Spacey acknowledged the similar career experiences between Darin and Spacey. "A lot of people doubted my dad's abilities, and Kevin's had doubters and naysayers," Dodd commented. "But both [men] were willing to take risks, and both were very resilient. My dad would always try new things. You could never pin him down. Kevin's career is similar." David Evanier, author of Roman Candle: The Life of Bobby Darin (ISBN 978-1-59486-010-2), said "You can put Kevin's obsessiveness about getting the film made right up there with Bobby's obsessiveness. He's also the ideal person to play Bobby. He has an uncanny physical resemblance to him, and he also has Bobby's intensity and dark side. Also, there's the connection with his mother. Bobby's mother's belief in him sent him soaring. Kevin's mother wanted him to make this film. Kevin sees the film as an act of devotion to his mother."

"I think the movie is about mothers and sons," Spacey said, referring to Darin's relationship with his mother Polly and sister Nina. Spacey's mother, Kathleen Fowler, died of brain cancer just before production started, as such, the film is dedicated in her memory, with the text "for Mom", being displayed before the credits. "I made the movie for all mothers, but especially for my mother. She introduced me to Bobby Darin. When she got very ill in 2002, I stopped everything and took care of her. We constantly played Bobby Darin records, and I'd let her listen to the tracks I was recording. I'm glad she passed knowing this was the movie I was going to make." After his award-winning performances in The Usual Suspects and American Beauty, Spacey "chose to move away from dark, sarcastic characters, and instead play damaged but good-hearted men" in films like Pay It Forward, K-PAX and The Shipping News. The actor was criticized for his career move; Spacey acknowledged the similarities when Darin integrated folk music and protest songs.

=== Production ===
In February 2003, it was announced that production for Beyond the Sea was becoming fast tracked with Spacey as lead actor, co-writer, producer and director, and Metro-Goldwyn-Mayer (MGM) agreed to cover distribution duties in North America. In August, with principal photography to begin in just weeks, MGM dropped out as distributor and main financier over scheduling conflicts. To accumulate financing of the film's $25 million budget, which came from foreign production companies, Spacey performed six songs at the November 2003 American Film Market. Lions Gate Entertainment quickly picked up the distribution duties, and Spacey found enough investors from England and Germany to continue moving forward on production.

In addition, Spacey declined to be paid for his work as actor, director, co-writer, and producer on Beyond the Sea. A portion of the $25 million budget came from his own Trigger Street Productions. Producer Arthur Friedman, who had shepherded the biopic since 1987, commented that he and Spacey experienced creative differences during pre-production. Friedman remarked that he was not involved with Beyond the Sea once production began in Germany. Filming was originally set to begin in June 2003 before it was pushed to November 7, 2003, lasting until late January 2004. Eighty percent of Beyond the Sea was shot using sound stages at Babelsberg Studios in Germany and Pinewood Studios in England. Lulworth Cove, Dorset, South West England doubled for Darin's setting of reclusiveness in Big Sur, California. In an attempt to convincingly portray Darin, particularly during the early stages of the singer's life depicted in the film, Spacey hired prosthetic makeup designer Peter King from The Lord of the Rings film trilogy.

== Music ==
The soundtrack album features 18 tracks performed by Kevin Spacey.

== Release ==
=== Marketing ===
To promote Beyond the Sea, Spacey and Phil Ramone devised a 12-city United States concert tour titled An Evening Celebrating the Music of Bobby Darin, which consisted of Spacey performing with a 19-piece band. "It's me singing Bobby and talking about Bobby and talking a little bit about the movie," Spacey explained in June 2004. Spacey dressed in costumes from the movie for the tour, which started in San Francisco and traveled through Los Angeles, New York City, Boston, Chicago, Miami and Atlantic City before ending in the Wayne Newton Theatre at the Stardust Hotel in Las Vegas. Spacey's performance at the Waldorf-Astoria Hotel on December 11, 2004, received a standing ovation. Dodd Darin commented, "It was said about my dad that he had some big brass ones. To do a film about my dad is one thing, but it's another thing to go out and attempt to work a nightclub. Kevin's got a lot of courage. I think he sounds good." The film was shown and promoted at the Toronto International Film Festival on September 11, 2004.

=== WGA arbitration ===
Beginning in October 2004, the Writers Guild of America, West conducted arbitration to determine writing credit for the scripts that had been written since Barry Levinson, who developed the film at Warner Bros. in 1987, left the project. Lewis Colick, James Toback and Tom Epperson disassociated themselves for credit by the WGA. The Guild justified credit to Colick, who wrote the first draft of The Bobby Darin Story in 1987, and Kevin Spacey. Actor-writer Jeffrey Meek believed he deserved credit; he was paid $85,000 of a promised $125,000 to settle his claim.

Spacey said Meek was "not a hired writer" on Beyond the Sea. "He turned in a draft, but it was a draft based on earlier material based on my own screenplays," Spacey said. Meek said he was hired by producer Harvey Friedman, a friend who helped connect him with Spacey, and whom supports his claim to have produced 12 drafts, including one that was reported by Variety to have been greenlighted by MGM in early 2003. "He bought my material and then acted like I didn't exist," Meek explained. "I'm not saying I'm Rembrandt, but it's like someone buying a painting and then scratching the name off of it and putting their own there."

== Reception ==
=== Critical response ===
Beyond the Sea received mixed reviews from critics. Based on 145 reviews collected by Rotten Tomatoes, 43% of the critics gave the film a positive review, with an average score of 5.2/10. Its consensus states "Kevin Spacey's bio of singer Bobby Darin is either a fearless piece of showmanship or an embarrassing vanity project, according to critics." Metacritic calculated a weighted average score of 46/100, based on 35 reviews.

"I'm very happy with the way the film turned out. Kevin loves my dad, and he wanted to do a tribute. My mother [who never remarried after her split from Darin] was speechless for a while after she saw it. It was emotional for her. There was a lot of truth and grit. But she couldn't be happier."
— Dodd Darin

Sandra Dee, Dodd Darin, Jimmy Scalia and Steve Blauner responded enthusiastically to Spacey's work on the film. Mick LaSalle of the San Francisco Chronicle felt that Spacey looked too old to portray Darin convincingly and called the film "one of the most embarrassing spectacles of 2004" and "jaw-droppingly awful, a misbegotten and ill-conceived vanity project." Desson Thomson from The Washington Post praised the actor's work, but also felt Spacey did not convincingly portray Darin in his early music career. Internet reviewer James Berardinelli found the storyline to be overtly clichéd, but added, "Despite the choppy narrative and inappropriate casting of Spacey, Beyond the Sea managed to keep me entertained."

Roger Ebert gave a largely positive review, stating, "Kevin Spacey believes he was born to play Bobby Darin. I believe he was born to play more interesting characters... In his own best work, Spacey has achieved genius; he is better as an actor than Darin ever was as a singer." Stephen Holden of The New York Times felt that "with Beyond the Sea, Spacey crawls back from his doomed quest to be a Tom Hanks-like everyman to his niche on the underbelly of Hollywood's pantheon. The movie's a mess, and at 45, Spacey is far too old to play Darin. Yet the star captures his desperation, his braggadocio, and yes, his magnetism." Peter Travers, writing in Rolling Stone magazine, believed Spacey could not prevent "the movie from groaning under the weight of biopic clichés. But the actor forges a bond with his subject that rights all wrongs. Doing his own singing (an uncanny imitation), Spacey is a marvel."

=== Box office ===
The film opened in limited release in the United States on December 17, 2004, and went into wider release on December 29. It grossed $6,318,709 in the US and $2,128,906 in international markets for a total worldwide box office of $8,447,615. It was declared a box office bomb because it did not make back its $25 million budget.

=== Accolades ===
Spacey was nominated for the Golden Globe Award for Best Actor - Motion Picture Musical or Comedy but lost to Jamie Foxx for Ray. He and Phil Ramone were also nominated for the Grammy Award for Best Compilation Soundtrack Album for a Motion Picture, Television or Other Visual Media, but lost to the producers of Ray.

== Home media ==
On June 7, 2005, the film was released on DVD in widescreen anamorphic format for Region 1 markets. It features two Dolby Digital English audio tracks (one in 2.0 Stereo and the other in 5.1 Surround Sound), director's commentary by Spacey, and a making-of featurette.
