= 1970 New York Film Critics Circle Awards =

36th New York Film Critics Circle Awards

36th New York Film Critics Circle Awards

January 18, 1971
(announced December 28, 1970)

Best Picture:
Five Easy Pieces

The 36th New York Film Critics Circle Awards, honored the best filmmaking of 1970.

== Winners ==
- Best Actor:
  - George C. Scott - Patton
  - Runners-up: Melvyn Douglas - I Never Sang for My Father and Jack Nicholson - Five Easy Pieces
- Best Actress:
  - Glenda Jackson - Women in Love
  - Runners-up: Karen Black - Five Easy Pieces and Liv Ullmann - The Passion of Anna (En passion)
- Best Director:
  - Bob Rafelson - Five Easy Pieces
  - Runners-up: Federico Fellini - Fellini Satyricon and Robert Altman - MASH
- Best Film:
  - Five Easy Pieces
  - Runners-up: The Passion of Anna (En passion) and MASH
- Best Screenplay:
  - Eric Rohmer - My Night at Maud's (Ma nuit chez Maud)
  - Runner-up: Elio Petri and Ugo Pirro - Investigation of a Citizen Above Suspicion (Indagine su un cittadino al di sopra di ogni sospetto)
- Best Supporting Actor:
  - Chief Dan George - Little Big Man
  - Runners-up: Paul Mazursky - Alex in Wonderland and Frank Langella - Diary of a Mad Housewife
- Best Supporting Actress:
  - Karen Black - Five Easy Pieces
  - Runners-up: Françoise Fabian - My Night at Maud's (Ma nuit chez Maud) and Ellen Burstyn - Alex in Wonderland
