= A Safe Place =

1971 film by Henry Jaglom

- Film poster
- Directed by: Henry Jaglom
- Written by: Henry Jaglom
- Produced by: Bert Schneider
- Starring: Tuesday Weld; Orson Welles; Jack Nicholson; Philip Proctor; Gwen Welles
- Cinematography: Richard C. Kratina
- Edited by: Pieter Bergema
- Production companies: Noonie Productions; BBS Productions
- Distributed by: Columbia Pictures
- Release date: October 15, 1971 (New York Film Festival)
- Running time: 94 minutes
- Country: United States
- Language: English

A Safe Place is a 1971 American drama film written and directed by Henry Jaglom and starring Tuesday Weld, Orson Welles and Jack Nicholson.

== Plot ==
A young woman, named Noah, lives alone in a small apartment in New York City. She is a mentally disturbed flower child, who retreats into her past, yearning for lost innocence. She recalls her childhood, searching for a "safe place." As a child (whose real name was Susan), she met a charismatic magician in Central Park who presented her with magical objects: a levitating silver ball, a star ring, and a Noah's ark.

In the present day, Noah is romantically involved with two different men: Fred, who is practical but dull, and Mitch, who is more dynamic and closer to her ideal fantasy partner. Neither man is able to fulfill her needs totally.

== Cast ==
The cast includes:

- Tuesday Weld as Susan/Noah
- Orson Welles as The Magician
- Jack Nicholson as Mitch
- Philip Proctor as Fred
- Gwen Welles as Bari
- Roger Garrett as Noah's friend
- Francesca Hilton as Noah's friend
- Rachel Finocchio as Noah's friend
- Julie Robinson as Noah's friend.

== Production ==
The film was "culled from 50 hours of footage."

The work was a product of BBS Productions, a company formed by Bob Rafelson, Bert Schneider, and Steve Blauner, financed by their work on the TV pop group the Monkees. Other BBS films of the era include Easy Rider, Five Easy Pieces, The Last Picture Show, The King of Marvin Gardens, Head, and Drive, He Said. All seven of these films have been restored and released in DVD versions by The Criterion Collection in a set called America Lost and Found: The BBS Story.

== Reception ==
TV Guide called the film a "critical and box-office disaster."

Time magazine called the film "pretentious and confusing", a film that "suggests that the rumors of his expertise [in editing the film Easy Rider] were greatly exaggerated, or at least that it does not extend to directing."

Vincent Canby described the film as a "superficial case history of a suicide" whose "narrative pretends to be a lot more complex"; Canby noted that the film "reveals the director's apparent adoration of his star [Weld], whom he studies in every possible light and color combination, and in every possible camera setup, often orchestrated with fine, corny songs out of the 1940s and 1950s on the order of Charles Trenet's 'La Mer' and 'Vous Qui Passez Sans Me Voir.'"

Variety said the film's "deliberate experimentation puts a heavy burden upon the viewer." Its writer-director "has plunged in over his own depth."
