= Radical (film) =

- Theatrical release poster
- Directed by: Christopher Zalla
- Screenplay by: Christopher Zalla
- Based on: A Radical Way of Unleashing a Generation of Geniuses by Joshua Davis
- Produced by: Benjamin Odell; Joshua Davis; Eugenio Derbez
- Starring: Eugenio Derbez; Daniel Haddad; Jennifer Trejo; Mia Fernanda Solis
- Cinematography: Mateo Londono
- Edited by: Eugenio Richer
- Music by: Pascual Reyes; Juan Pablo Villa
- Production companies: 3Pas Studios; Epic Magazine; The Lift
- Distributed by: Videocine
- Release date: October 20, 2023
- Running time: 126 minutes
- Country: Mexico
- Language: Spanish
- Box office: $21.8 million

Radical is a 2023 Mexican comedy-drama film written and directed by Christopher Zalla. Based on the 2013 Wired article, "A Radical Way of Unleashing a Generation of Geniuses" by Joshua Davis, it stars Eugenio Derbez in the lead role.

The film, which is Zalla's second directorial film, premiered on January 19, 2023, at the Sundance Film Festival, where it received the Festival Favorite Award. It was released in Mexico on October 20, 2023.

== Plot ==
In 2011, a new teacher, Sergio Juarèz Correa, arrives at the poorly-run Jose Urbina Lopez Elementary in Matamoros. In an oppressive environment rife with drug cartel violence, students at the school suffer from some of the worst academic scores in all of Mexico. Given the run-down facilities and lack of educational resources such as computers, the majority of the teachers have little motivation and focus mainly on getting their classes to pass government-mandated standardized tests that do nothing to inspire actual learning.

Sergio surprises his sixth graders by taking an unorthodox approach to teaching and encourages them to solve problems creatively. To help them think mathematically, for example, he transforms the classroom, turning all the desks upside down to hypothetically represent lifeboats in an ocean that can each hold a certain amount of people. Through this new method, he is able to get his students to determine the right answer. When the school principal, Chucho, checks on the class, he is as baffled as they are.

After continued efforts, this style of teaching begins to have a positive impact on the children academically. Having given his class the ability to think independently, Sergio inspires his sixth graders to have confidence and achieve a potential beyond their impoverished circumstances. His alternative approach involves student-led learning that gets the children involved and engaged like they never were before. When it becomes clear the results are positive, even Chucho grows supportive of Sergio.

By promoting independent thought, Sergio eventually runs afoul with a visiting administrator when his students openly discuss issues of morality, notedly abortion. He attempts to defend their new way of learning but is sidelined and becomes disillusioned, eventually withdrawing from his teaching responsibilities after the death of Nico, one of his students. As a result, his class regresses academically due to the trauma of losing a friend and thus a teacher.

Concerned about him, Chucho approaches Sergio at his home to encourage him to not give up on his sixth graders. After some soul-searching, Sergio reconnects with his gifted student, Paloma, and convinces her father to let her pursue her dreams of becoming an astronaut. With the academic year ending, he rushes to the school during standardized testing and urges his class to keep believing in themselves. His students take heart and do well on the tests. Some of them eventually go on to find success in private business and work for Big Tech companies in the United States.

== Cast ==
- Eugenio Derbez as Sergio
- Daniel Haddad as Chucho
- Jennifer Trejo as Paloma
- Mia Fernanda Solis as Lupe
- Danilo Guardiola as Nico
- Víctor Estrada as Chepe

== Reception ==
=== Box office ===
Radical has grossed $12.4 million in Mexico and $8.7 million in other territories for a worldwide total of $21.1 million.

The film was released in the United States on November 3, 2023, and made $2.7 million from 419 theaters that opening weekend, finishing in fifth place with a "very strong" per-venue average of $6,516. During the second weekend, it expanded to another 115 locations and grossed $1.75 million, coming in tenth place with a 66% hold.

=== Critical response ===
On the review aggregator website Rotten Tomatoes, 94% of 62 critics' reviews are positive, with an average rating of 7.8/10. The website's consensus reads: "Offering few surprises but plenty of uplift, Radical tells a stirring fact-based story brought to life by some top-flight work from Eugenio Derbez." Metacritic, which uses a weighted average, assigned the film a score of 71 out of 100, based on 14 critics, indicating "generally favorable" reviews.

The Hollywood Reporter's David Rooney wrote that "director Christopher Zalla adheres to the subgenre's conventions and doesn't stint on sentimentality, but Radical more than earns its surging emotional payoff". Johnny Oleksinski, reviewing the film in the New York Post calls Radical "a Spanish-language gem about a real teacher's impact on a poor Mexican border town".

In her review for the New York Times, Natalia Winkelman wrote that Radical is "a sentimental drama that is based on a true story but boxes neatly into familiar packaging. The title is nearly oxymoronic: It boldly belies how close to convention the film hews." Echoing criticism over the film's formulaic style, Nick Allen of RogerEbert.com opined that "Radical feels too often like its drama has been copied from a tearjerking textbook; it’s nearly flagrant about having so many predictable beats" and noted that while "there’s no inherent problem with aiming to be a crowd-pleaser, [...] the heartwarming real stuff feels too good to be true."

Claudia Piñeiro, serving as the president of the 27th Málaga Film Festival main competition jury, stated that the film is "an urgent, necessary story that had to be told, and they told it in the best way [possible]".

=== Accolades ===
At the 7th Astra Film Awards, the film was nominated for Best International Feature while Derbez was nominated for Best International Actor.
