= Joshua Davis (writer) =

American writer, film producer and co-founder of Epic Magazine

- Born: 1974 (age 51–52)
- Occupations: Writer; journalist; filmmaker; co-founder of Epic Magazine
- Website: www.joshuadavis.net

Joshua Davis (born 1974) is an American writer, film producer and co-founder of Epic Magazine.

== Early life ==
Davis is the son of Miss Nevada winner Janet Hadland and Highlander film producer Peter S. Davis. Davis attended Stanford University, where he double majored in Economics and Modern Thought and Literature.

== Career ==
Davis wrote The New York Times bestselling book Spare Parts, which grew out of his article "La Vida Robot." The story follows the lives of four teenage immigrants who built an underwater robot. The book was a finalist for Columbia University's J. Anthony Lukas Book Prize and was adapted into the 2015 film Spare Parts by Lionsgate starring George Lopez, Jamie Lee Curtis and Marisa Tomei.

In 2012, Davis was kidnapped in Libya while reporting an article for Men's Journal. Later that year, he lived with John McAfee in Belize and documented McAfee's lifestyle and legal problems, including allegations of murder. In 2003, Davis covered the Iraq War for Wired. For The New Yorker in 2011, Davis wrote about bitcoin when the cryptocurrency was worth five dollars. He has also profiled Elon Musk multiple times, including a 2010 Wired cover story and in an early in-depth article about Tesla.

Davis' first book, The Underdog, was published by Random House in 2005. It chronicles Davis' entry into unusual competitions around the world, including the US Sumo Open and the World Armwrestling Championship in Gdynia, Poland. Davis documented his time as a competitive arm wrestler in the film "The Beast Within," which won best documentary at the Telluride Mountain Film Festival.

In 2013, Davis and Joshuah Bearman formed Epic Magazine, a magazine and production company specializing in unusual true stories. Davis and Bearman have sold more than fifty articles to Hollywood, with four films and two TV series produced. Davis, in partnership with J. J. Abrams and Bad Robot, produced the short documentary series "Moon Shot," which chronicles the work of those competing for the Google Lunar X Prize.

In 2019, Epic Magazine was acquired by Vox Media for an undisclosed sum.

In 2025, Penguin Random House published The Uncertainty Principle, a young adult novel co-authored by Davis and his son Kal Kini-Davis. The book was a 2026 Rainbow List Young Adult Pick.

Also in 2025, Davis executive produced the documentary Lilith Fair: Building a Mystery, about the music festival founded by Sarah Machlachlan, and The Merchants of Joy, which chronicles the lives and businesses of the suppliers of Christmas trees to New York City. The Merchants of Joy was nominated for an Emmy Award for Best Documentary.

== Awards ==
- 2003 Winner of Best Documentary at the Telluride Mountain Film Festival for The Beast Within
- 2014 Finalist for the National Magazine Award in Feature Writing for "John McAfee's Last Stand"
- 2015 Finalist for the Columbia School of Journalism's Lukas Prize for Spare Parts
- 2021 Finalist for an Independent Spirit Award as an Executive Producer of Little America
- 2022 Winner of a Special Jury Prize at the Sundance Film Festival as an Executive Producer of Breaking
- 2023 Winner of the Audience Award for Best Film at the Sundance Film Festival as a Producer of Radical
- 2026 Emmy Nomination for Best Documentary as a Producer of The Merchants of Joy

== Filmography ==
Title	Director	Writer	Producer	Ref.
West Coast	Yes	Yes	Yes	
The Beast Within	Yes	Yes	Yes	
The Sun Also Sets	Yes	Yes	Yes	
Moonshot	No	No	Yes	
The Debater	Yes	No	Yes	
Spare Parts	No	Yes	No	
Little America	No	No	Yes	
Breaking	No	No	Yes	
Radical	No	No	Yes	
The Big Cigar	No	No	Yes	
Lilith Fair: Building a Mystery	No	No	Yes	
The Merchants of Joy	No	No	Yes	

== Bibliography ==
=== Books ===
- The Underdog, 2006
- Entrenched, 2011
- McAfee's Last Stand, 2012
- Spare Parts: Four Undocumented Teenagers, One Ugly Robot, and the Battle for the American Dream, 2014
- The Uncertainty Principle, 2025

=== Articles ===
- "If We Run Out Of Batteries, This War Is Screwed," Wired, June 1, 2003
- "La Vida Robot," Best of Technology Writing, 2006
- "Say Hello to Stanley," Best of Technology Writing, 2007
- "Face Blind," Best American Science Writing, 2007
- "The Untold Story of the World's Biggest Diamond Heist," Wired, March 12, 2009
- "The Crypto Currency," The New Yorker, October 10, 2011
- "Fox Makes Epic First-Look Deal for Online Venture for Film Centric Journalism," Deadline, August 19, 2013
- "Magazine Writing, On the Web, for Film," The New York Times, August 11, 2013
- "The Mercenary," Medium, August 19, 2013
- "Building An Epic Brand Around Incredible True Stories," Fast Company, August 23, 2013
- "Pipino: Gentleman Thief," Epic Magazine, 2014
- "Deep Sea Cowboys," Epic Magazine, 2017
- "Arab Spring Break," Epic Magazine, 2017
