= Raybert Productions =

1960s production company

Raybert Productions was a production company that operated in the 1960s, founded by Bob Rafelson and Bert Schneider. Its principal works were the situation comedy The Monkees (and the group of the same name), and the 1969 movie Easy Rider (co-produced with Peter Fonda's Pando Company). Raybert was also the predecessor to BBS Productions, a New Hollywood production company founded by Rafelson, Schneider, and Schneider's childhood friend Stephen Blauner. BBS Productions' best known film is The Last Picture Show.

== History of Raybert Productions ==
Wishing to break into movie production, but lacking experience, Rafelson and Schneider used their Hollywood connections to get the chance to produce a pilot episode for a television series. Adapting what they saw in the Beatles' movies A Hard Day's Night and Help!, and throwing in ideas of their own, Schneider and Rafelson developed The Monkees as the misadventures of an as-yet undiscovered rock band, with songs by the (originally) fictional band as soundtrack music, and as a tie-in for promotion and merchandising.

The original edit of their pilot episode (filmed late in 1965, with music provided by Boyce and Hart) rated poorly with a test audience, but a re-edit scored one of the highest ratings ever, and NBC bought a season's worth of episodes. Screen Gems, the television wing of Columbia Pictures, had a music publishing department, with ties to some of the best songwriting talent in the US (including New York City's Brill Building songwriters), and were able to provide top-notch songs for the show, while Colgems Records was set up to issue records from The Monkees and other productions.

When the Monkees became a hit in both television and popular music, Rafelson and Schneider in turn became famous. They used their success to achieve their initial goal of producing movies. The first, called Head, also starred the Monkees, and was intended to lift both producers and stars to a new level. Unfortunately there was a falling-out between the two sides, with only Peter Tork showing up for the first day of filming, and by the time the completed movie was ready for release, the television series had been cancelled (after two seasons and two Emmy Awards), and the Monkees phenomenon appeared to be winding down. Schneider and Rafelson distanced themselves from the band even during the shoot (pointedly playing records by other groups around the set), and promptly involved themselves in other projects, including Easy Rider.

== History of BBS Productions ==
After producing Five Easy Pieces in 1969, the two partners took on a third partner, Stephen Blauner, naming their expanded company BBS Productions (for Bert, Bob and Steve). Blauner, who'd also been involved with the Monkees series (even getting a name-check in one episode, as a gangster), later produced New Monkees in the 1980s, under the name Straybert Productions. On December 31, 1971, BBS sold all of its outstanding shares of its stocks to Columbia Pictures.

The Last Picture Show (1971) and Hearts and Minds (1974 Academy Award winner for Best Documentary Feature) were but two distinctly iconoclastic features from BBS Productions among some of the most influential and enduring classics of the early 1970s New Hollywood era which anticipated the rise of American independent film through the 1980s and '90s. After a cameo in Head and small part in Easy Rider, Jack Nicholson starred in three others—Five Easy Pieces (1970), A Safe Place (1971), & The King of Marvin Gardens (1972)—as well as co-wrote Drive, He Said (1971), which was his directorial debut. In fact, the only BBS narrative film that Nicholson does not appear in is The Last Picture Show.

Blauner would later recall the Raybert brand with "Straybert Productions" in order to produce New Monkees, a reboot of the Monkees TV series.

== Home video releases ==
A multi-disc boxed set entitled America Lost and Found: The BBS Story was released by The Criterion Collection on Blu-ray and DVD in 2010. The set included the films Head, Easy Rider, Five Easy Pieces, Drive, He Said, The Last Picture Show, A Safe Place, and The King of Marvin Gardens. The set, which "originated as a 'New Hollywood' set under the auspices of Sony Pictures Home Entertainment", marks the first time that either Drive, He Said or A Safe Place have ever been released on home video in any format.
