= P. J. Byrne =

American actor (born 1974)

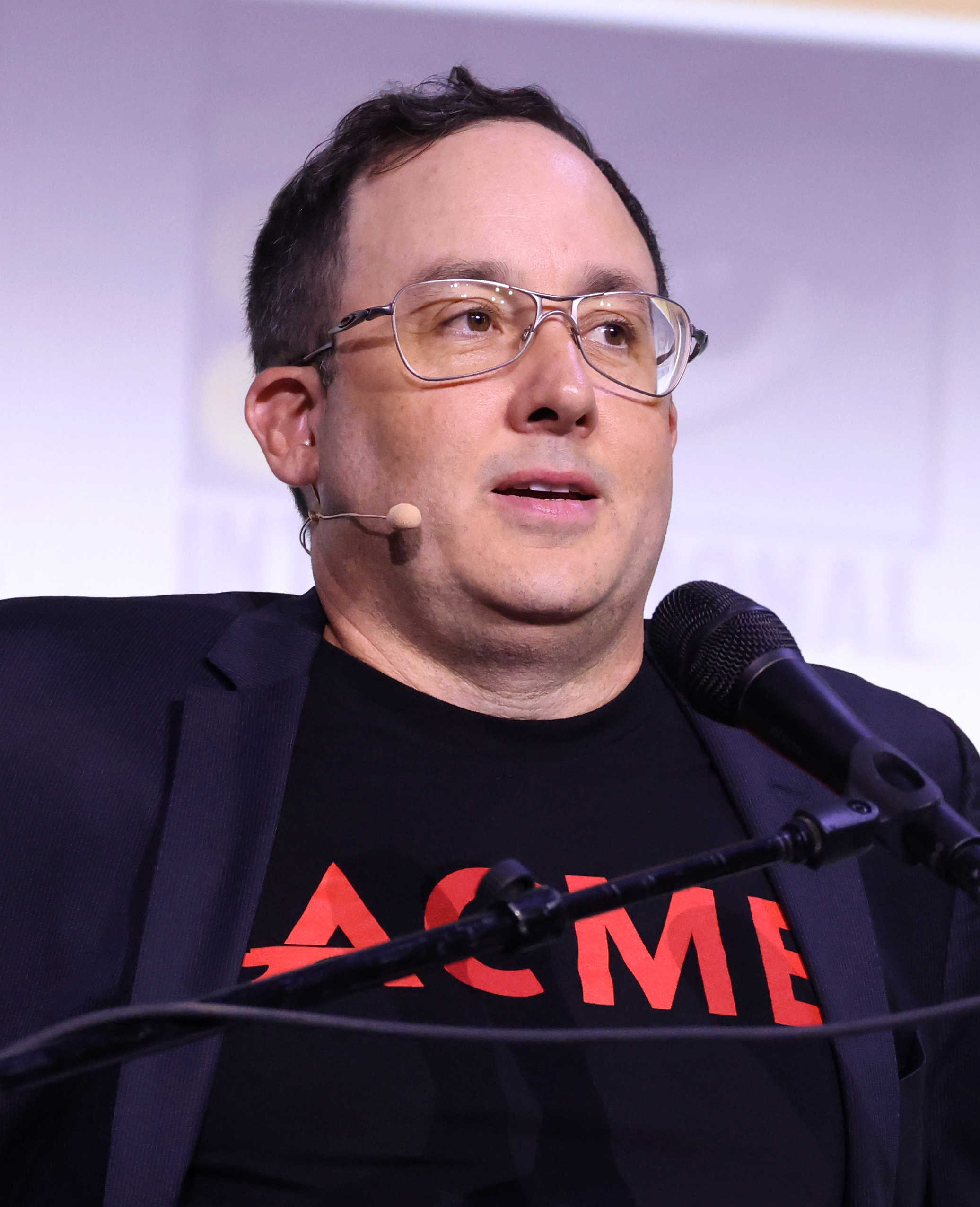
- Byrne in 2025
- Born: Paul Jeffrey Byrne; December 15, 1974 (age 51); Maplewood, New Jersey, U.S.
- Education: Boston College (BA); DePaul University (MFA)
- Occupation: Actor
- Years active: 2001–present
- Spouse: Jaime Padula (m. 2007)
- Children: 3

Paul Jeffrey Byrne (born December 15, 1974) is an American actor. He is best known for his roles as Nicky "Rugrat" Koskoff in the Martin Scorsese film The Wolf of Wall Street (2013), Irv Smiff on the UPN/CW series The Game, and Bolin on Nickelodeon's animated series The Legend of Korra (2012–2014).

== Early life and education ==
Byrne was born in Maplewood, New Jersey, to Emma N. (née Ferraro) and Paul I. Byrne Jr., and is of Irish and Italian descent. He was raised in Old Tappan, New Jersey, where he graduated from Northern Valley Regional High School at Old Tappan.

Byrne graduated Boston College with a double major in finance and theater and an MFA from The Theatre School at DePaul University. He intended to become an investment banker before a drama teacher at BC convinced him to follow his passion for acting.

== Career ==
Byrne started his career in small roles in such films as Bruce Almighty, Fun with Dick and Jane, Bewitched and Because I Said So. He also had guest roles on television series such as ER, The West Wing, Reno 911! and NCIS before getting a recurring role on The Game.

Byrne went on to have more prominent roles in films such as Dinner for Schmucks, Extraordinary Measures, The Campaign and Horrible Bosses. He was cast in one of the main roles in Final Destination 5, which received generally positive reviews and was a commercial success.

In addition to his on-screen roles, Byrne provided the voice of Bolin, one of the lead roles in the Nickelodeon series The Legend of Korra, from the show's beginning in 2012 to its end in 2014. He voiced recurring character Firestorm in Justice League Action.

In 2013, Byrne appeared in Martin Scorsese's film The Wolf of Wall Street, which received critical acclaim and was nominated for numerous awards. The next year, he starred in the television series Intelligence.

He joined Dwayne Johnson in the 2018 action film Rampage.

== Personal life ==
Byrne resides in Los Angeles with his wife, Jaime, who was the executive director of health services in Los Angeles and Beverly Hills, and is currently president of Jaime Byrne Events, LLC. They have two daughters and one son.

== Filmography ==
=== Film ===
Key
†	Denotes films that have not yet been released

Year	Title	Role	Notes
2002	Blood Work	Forensics Worker #2	
2003	Bruce Almighty	Panicked Newsroom Staffer	
2005	Fun with Dick and Jane	Laughing Executive	
2005	Bewitched	Writer	
2007	Charlie Wilson's War	Jim Van Wagenen	
2007	Evan Almighty	Evan's Staffer	
2007	Loveless in Los Angeles	Perry	
2007	Because I Said So	Photographer	
2008	Be Kind Rewind	Mr. Baker	
2008	First Sunday	Dr. Preston	
2008	Kissing Cousins	Tucker	
2008	Surfer, Dude	Zarno's Lawyer	
2008	Soul Men	Floyd's Doctor	
2009	Finding Bliss	Gary	
2010	Dinner for Schmucks	Davenport	
2010	Extraordinary Measures	Dr. Preston	
2011	Horrible Bosses	Kenny Sommerfield	
2011	Final Destination 5	Isaac Palmer	
2012	The Campaign	Rick	
2012	K-11	C.R.	
2013	The Wolf of Wall Street	Nicky "Rugrat" Koskoff	
2014	Walk of Shame	Moshe	
2015	The Gift	Danny McDonald	
2016	True Memoirs of an International Assassin	Trent	
2017	Eloise	Scott Carter	
2017	The Clapper	Mr. Caldwell	
2017	Home Again	Paul	
2017	Miyubi	Peter	
2018	The 15:17 to Paris	Mr. Henry	
2018	Rampage	Nelson	
2018	Green Book	Record Exec	
2019	Countdown	Father John	
2019	Bombshell	Neil Cavuto	
2019	Mob Town	Vincent Vasisko	
2022	Somewhere in Queens	Ben Pearson	
2022	Spirited	Mr. Alteli	
2022	Babylon	Max (Ruth's Assistant Director)	
2023	Shazam! Fury of the Gods	Dr. Dario Bava	
2023	Scooby-Doo! and Krypto, Too!	J.B. (voice)	
2024	Dear Santa	Mr. Charles	
2024	A Complete Unknown	Harold Leventhal	
2026	The End of Oak Street	Mel Jacobs	
2026	Coyote vs. Acme	Bill Pelicanos	
2026	I Play Rocky	Irwin Winkler	
2026	Bad Day †		Completed
TBA	Clashing Through the Snow †		Post-production

=== Television ===
Year	Title	Role	Notes / Ref.
2002	Presidio Med	Dr. Whitby	Episode: "Milagros"
2002	ER	Ken the Kiosk Man	Episode: "Dead Again"
2003	The Lyon's Den	Larry Michaels	Episode: "Blood"
2003	Strong Medicine	Levin	Episode: "Rash Decisions"
2003	Yes, Dear	AD	Episode: "Let's Get Jaggy with It"
2003	Crossing Jordan	Forensic Goofball	Episode: "Ockham's Razor"
2005	The West Wing	David Orbitz	Episode: "Ninety Miles Away"
2006	My Boys	Keith Luger	Episode: "Released"
2006	Just Legal	Wayne	Episode: "Body in the Trunk"
2006	Reno 911!	Agent Bruce Padul	Episode: "Spanish Mike Returns"
2006	The New Adventures of Old Christine	Doug	Episode: "Exile on Lame Street"
2006	Four Kings	Sheldon Dratch	Episode: "Elephant in the Room"
2006	Twins	Eric Weiner	Episode: "Sneaks and Geeks"
2006	NCIS	Ross Logan	Episode: "Deception"
2006–2009, 2012, 2015	The Game	Irv Smiff	Recurring role
2007	Viva Laughlin	Jonesy	2 episodes
2007	Boston Legal	Matthew Steinkellner	Episode: "Dumping Bella"
2007	Desperate Housewives	Nick	Episode: "Not While I'm Around"
2009	Hannah Montana	Baz B. Berkley	2 episodes
2009	Three Rivers	Dale Coffey	Episode: "Place of Life"
2009	It's Always Sunny in Philadelphia	Tad	Episode: "The Gang Exploits the Mortgage Crisis"
2009	Burn Notice	Stacey Conolly	Episode: "Fearless Leader"
2009	Bones	Joe Fillion	Episode: "The Cinderella in the Cardboard"
2011	The Mentalist	Kieran Carruthers	Episode: "Rhapsody in Red"
2011	Castle	Tony	Episode: "To Love and Die in LA"
2012	Are You There, Chelsea?	Elliot	2 episodes
2012–2014	The Legend of Korra	Bolin	Voice, main cast
2014	Intelligence	Nelson Cassidy	Main role
2015	Being Mary Jane	Arthur Holzman	2 episodes
2016	Vinyl	Scott Leavitt	Main role
2016	Blindspot	Douglas Winter	Episode: "Her Spy's Harmed"
2016–2017	Justice League Action	Ronnie Raymond / Firestorm	Voice, recurring role (11 episodes)
2017–2019	Big Little Lies	Principal Nippal	Recurring role
2017–2018	I'm Dying Up Here	Kenny Vessey	7 episodes
2018–2019	Black Lightning	Principal Mike Lowry	5 episodes
2018	Tremors	Melvin Plug	Television film
2018	Bunnicula	Dragon, Rock Monster	Voice, episode: "Bunn Vs."
2019	Black-ish	Mr. Solomon	Episodes: "Wilds of Valley Glen"
2019	Dynasty	Stuart	2 episodes
2019	Lodge 49	Dag	Episode: "The Door"
2020–2021	All Rise	Juror Futrell	2 episodes
2020–2026	The Boys	Adam Bourke	6 episodes
2021	Never Have I Ever	Evan	Recurring role (season 2)
2021	Them	Stuart Berks	3 episodes
2021	Cobra Kai	Greg	Episode: "Party Time"
2021–2023	Ghosts	Dan Herbst, Lawyer	2 episodes
2022	Roar	Rodney	Episode: "The Woman Who Found Bite Marks on Her Skin"
2022	Irreverent	Mackenzie 'Mack' Boyd	10 episodes
2023	Teen Titans Go!	Flash	Voice, episode: "Teen Titans Action"
2023	Gen V	Adam Bourke	2 episodes
2023	Quantum Leap	Enock Abrams	Episode: "This Took Too Long!"
2024	The Big Cigar	Stephen Blauner	Miniseries
2025–present	The Rainmaker	Deck Shifflet	Main role
2026	The Five-Star Weekend	JB	4 episodes

=== Music videos ===
Year	Title	Artist	Ref.
2011	"New Romance"	Miles Fisher	

=== Video games ===
Year	Title	Voice role	Ref.
2014	The Legend of Korra	Bolin	
2026	The Boys: Trigger Warning	Adam Bourke	
