= The Merchants of Joy =

- Directed by: Celia Aniskovich
- Produced by: Celia Aniskovich; Zoe Vock; Arthur Spector; Joshua Davis; Josh Bearman
- Production companies: Amazon MGM Studios; Boat Rocker Studios; Artists Equity; Dial Tone Films; Epic
- Distributed by: Amazon Prime Video
- Release date: December 1, 2025
- Countries: Canada; United States
- Language: English

The Merchants of Joy is a 2025 documentary film which explores the Christmas tree business in New York City and five of the families who participate in it.

== Production ==
Development for the documentary film was announced in February 2024, when Celia Aniskovich announced a documentary based on the 2022 feature article "Secrets of the Christmas Tree Trade" originally appeared in Vox Media's publishing brands Epic Magazine and New York Magazine entitled The Merchants of Joy, director Celia Aniskovich would serve as director & producer for the documentary via her production studio Dial Tone Films with Canadian film & television production studio Boat Rocker Studios and its American unscripted Production outfit Matador Content co-producing with Todd Lubin and Jack Turner of Boat Rocker's American unscripted studio Matador Content, the former who was also president of Boat Rocker Studios' unscripted division, would serve as executive producers for the upcoming documentary film alongside Boat Rocker's co-founders & presidents David Frontier & Ivan Schneeberg while it would handle distribution to the film globally.

One year later in October 2025, Amazon MGM Studios had joined the documentary with them acquiring worldwide distribution to the Documentary The Merchants of Joy for Amazon's streaming service Amazon Prime Video and became a co-producer to the film while Artists Equity, a company founded by Ben Affleck and Matt Damon, had joined the documentary as a co-producer while its co-founder Ben Affleck would serve as executive producer.

== Release date ==
In November 2025, Amazon MGM Studios announced that the documentary film would be released on Amazon Prime Video on December 1, 2025.
