= Grilled (film) =

2006 American comedy film

- DVD cover
- Directed by: Jason Ensler
- Screenplay by: William Tepper
- Story by: William Tepper; Larry Hankin
- Produced by: Jeff Sussman; Rory Rosegarten; Jon Klane; Bradley Jenkel; William Tepper
- Starring: Ray Romano; Kevin James
- Cinematography: Lawrence Sher
- Edited by: Chris Peppe
- Music by: Adam Cohen
- Production companies: Avery Pix; The Jon Klane Company
- Distributed by: New Line Cinema
- Release date: July 11, 2006
- Running time: 83 minutes
- Country: United States
- Language: English
- Box office: $46,663

Grilled is a 2006 American dark comedy crime film directed by Jason Ensler and starring Ray Romano and Kevin James. It was released direct-to-video in the United States on July 11, 2006. Maurice (Romano) and Dave (James) are inept door-to-door meat salesmen who need to make a sale to keep their jobs. After several unsuccessful attempts, they meet a potential client who leads the guys into a complicated series of events culminating with an encounter with a Mafia princess and a deadly mobster.

== Plot ==
Maurice and Dave try, but fail to sell steaks to people through a mail service. Tired of their incompetence, their boss gives them cards with the names and addresses of their highest buyers, warning that this is their last chance. Dave loses all but one of the cards. It leads to a woman named Loridonna.

Loridonna is on the phone with her friend Suzanne, who has swallowed a fish and needs help. Loridonna tells Suzanne that Dave is a doctor and gives him the phone; while Dave is talking to Suzanne, Loridonna talks seductively about wanting Maurice's "meat". Turned on, Maurice tries to seal a deal, but Dave says Suzanne wants to kill herself. They drive Loridonna to Suzanne's house, where they discover that she is an alcoholic whose suicide was a false alarm.

Loridonna and Maurice begin making out, and Suzanne's husband Tony comes home and catches them, but he casually changes clothes while telling Maurice that she was once a man. Loridonna confirms this and tries to explain, but Maurice is too disappointed (and disgusted) to care. Tony then attempts to kill Dave, thinking he tried to seduce Suzanne. After explaining, Dave and Tony become friendly. Tony begins to grill some steaks, then is ambushed, shot, and killed by two hitmen.

Finding some of Tony's guns, Dave and Maurice fight back. The hitmen put them into the trunk of their car and leave them there while attending a party. Maurice manages to get out, then sees Goldbluth, a name from the cards they got from their boss. After freeing Dave, they start describing to party guests the tenderness of their steaks. The hitmen return looking for them. Dave is unable to leave because Goldbluth is rambling on. He signs a contract to buy meat, so they warn Goldbluth that two hitmen are here to kill him. Dave gives Goldbluth the gun Tony had when he was killed.

Maurice and Dave drive off, looking back to see shots fired. Goldbluth comes out without a scratch. Maurice and Dave return to their boss with seven orders and $21,000 up front from Goldbluth.

== Cast ==
- Ray Romano as Maurice Schulz
- Kevin James as Dave Langer
- Mary Lynn Rajskub as Renee
- Jack Kehler as Dick Abbott
- Jon Polito as Leon Waterman
- Sofia Vergara as Loridonna
- Juliette Lewis as Suzanne
- Jim Doughan as Andy Wilson
- Kim Coates as Tony
- Michael Rapaport as Bobby
- Barry Newman as Boris
- Burt Reynolds as Goldbluth
- Eric Allan Kramer as Irving

== Release ==
Grilled was originally titled Men Don't Quit, and was set for a worldwide theatrical release in 2005. Poor test screenings pushed it back, and the film only received a theatrical release in the United Arab Emirates. The film was released straight-to-video in the United States.

== Reception ==
=== Box office ===
The film only saw a theatrical performance in the United Arab Emirates. In its opening weekend, the film ranked third, grossing $26,012 from 12 theaters with an average of $2,167 per screen. The film dropped to fifth in its sophomore weekend with a decrease of 45.8%, grossing $14,103 from 10 theaters with an average of $1,410 per screen, before being pulled completely from all remaining theaters.

=== Critical response ===
The film received negative reviews from critics. Scott Weinberg of DVDTalk gave the film 2 out of 5 stars, writing, "I suppose there's a great comedy to be made on the subject of door-to-door meat salesmen... actually, there probably isn't".

== Home media ==
On the North American Region 1 DVD, bonus features include a single deleted scene, a making-of featurette, and a documentary on Romano and James' real-life friendship.
