= William Tepper =

American actor

- Born: June 27, 1948; The Bronx, New York City, U.S.
- Died: October 4, 2017 (aged 69)
- Education: University of California, Los Angeles
- Occupations: Actor, screenwriter

William Tepper (June 27, 1948 – October 4, 2017) was an American actor and screenwriter, best known for his lead role in Jack Nicholson's directorial debut, Drive, He Said (1971).

== Biography ==
Tepper was born on June 27, 1948, in The Bronx borough of New York City. He studied filmmaking at the University of California, Los Angeles.

Tepper starred opposite Karen Black in Drive, He Said, which also marked Jack Nicholson's debut as a film director. Tepper and Nicholson traveled to the 1971 Cannes Film Festival for the film's debut. Tepper's other film roles included Breathless in 1983 and a co-starring role in the 1984 Tom Hanks film, Bachelor Party, as well as the 1970s television series, Ironside and Kojak.

In addition to acting, Tepper co-produced the 1980 dramatic film, Heart Beat, which starred Nick Nolte and Sissy Spacek. Tepper also produced and wrote the screenplay for the 2006 film, Grilled, starring Ray Romano, Kevin James and Sofia Vergara.

Tepper died of a heart attack on October 4, 2017, at the age of 69.

== Filmography ==
Year	Title	Role	Notes
1971	Drive, He Said	Hector	
1972	Call Her Mom	Roscoe	ABC Movie of the Week
1973	Ironside	Johnny	Episode: "A Game of Showdown"
1974	Kojak	Santangelo	Episode: "The Only Way Out"
1982	Miss Right	Terry Bartell	
1983	Breathless	Paul	
1984	Bachelor Party	Dr. Stan Gassko	
