= Drive, He Said =

1971 film by Jack Nicholson

- Theatrical release poster
- Directed by: Jack Nicholson
- Screenplay by: Jeremy Larner; Jack Nicholson; Uncredited: Terrence Malick; Robert Towne
- Based on: Drive, He Said; 1964 novel by Jeremy Larner
- Produced by: Steve Blauner; Jack Nicholson
- Starring: William Tepper; Karen Black; Michael Margotta; Bruce Dern; Robert Towne; Henry Jaglom; Michael Warren
- Cinematography: Bill Butler
- Edited by: Donn Cambern; Christopher Holmes; Pat Somerset; Robert L. Wolfe
- Music by: David Shire
- Production companies: Drive Productions; BBS Productions
- Distributed by: Columbia Pictures
- Release dates: May 24, 1971 (Cannes); June 30, 1971 (U.S.)
- Running time: 90 minutes
- Country: United States
- Language: English
- Budget: $800,000

Drive, He Said is a 1971 American sports comedy-drama film directed by Jack Nicholson, in his directorial debut, and starring William Tepper, Karen Black, Bruce Dern, Robert Towne and Henry Jaglom. Based on the 1964 novel of the same name by Jeremy Larner, the film follows a disenchanted college basketball player who is having an affair with a professor's wife, as well as dealing with his counterculture roommate's preoccupation with avoiding the draft in the Vietnam War. The film features supporting performances by David Ogden Stiers, Cindy Williams, and Michael Warren. The screenplay was adapted by Larner and Nicholson, and included uncredited contributions from Terrence Malick.

After screening at the Cannes Film Festival, where it was poorly received, the film faced more backlash from the Motion Picture Association of America for its profanity and sexual content, including numerous scenes featuring full-frontal male nudity.

The title comes from the poem "I Know a Man" by Robert Creeley, which a character recites in the opening scene. It also serves as a cryptic reference to basketball, the movie's dominant milieu.

== Plot ==
Hector Bloom is a laconic, libidinous college basketball star distracted by obligations and current events: the misadventures of his volatile roommate Gabriel, a potential pro career, the draft, campus unrest, and a turbulent affair with Olive, the wife of Richard, a professor and friend. His coach pays special attention to him, given Hector's abilities, but is unsure how to get him to focus and fulfill his potential. Hector's attitude, and his coach's frustration, is exemplified by a meeting before an important late-season game where the coach instructs him to "play it straight out there tonight, I don't want any fooling around at all"; to his coach's exasperation, Hector replies "Why not?"

Gabriel, a vulgar borderline psychotic, is far more troubled and committed to rebellion than Hector. He abuses drugs, disrupts a basketball game with a guerrilla theatre stunt, goes crazy during an induction physical, ransacks his apartment, espouses anti-establishment views about everything, and drifts aimlessly.

During a confrontation in a grocery store, Olive informs Hector that she is pregnant, implies he is not the father, and tells him their affair is over. Hector replies that he has "the clap", which infuriates Olive; she warns him that if he follows her, she will call the police.

That night, Hector leads his team to a huge victory; the fans storm the court, and triumphantly carry Hector off. At the same time, Gabriel breaks into Olive's house while she is bathing and physically assaults her. She fends off his attack, eventually running outdoors with Gabriel in pursuit just as Hector drives up. Gabriel, aware of Hector's trysts with Olive, screams at Hector that Olive prefers him over Richard, then runs off when Richard arrives home. Hector confronts Richard, telling him Olive should be with him; a shaken Olive asserts her independence, saying "I'm not going with anybody, anywhere". Richard warns Hector "I'll kill you", then escorts Olive back into their house.

The next morning Gabriel, completely naked, runs into a biology lab and frees snakes, an iguana, mice and other vermin. Eventually campus police and white-coated attendants arrive with a straitjacket; Gabriel rebuffs them, insisting he is both "right and sane". They cloak him in a blanket and lead him into a padded van. Hector, seeing this, jumps onto the back of the van, demanding they open it. As the van pulls away, he jumps off, yelling to Gabriel that his mother called.

== Cast ==
- William Tepper as Hector Bloom
- Karen Black as Olive
- Michael Margotta as Gabriel
- Bruce Dern as Coach Bullion
- Robert Towne as Richard
- Henry Jaglom as Conrad
- Michael Warren as Easly
- June Fairchild as Sylvie
- Don Hanmer as Director of Athletics
- Lynette Bernay as Dance Instructor
- Joseph Walsh as First Announcer
- Harry Gittes as Second Announcer
- Charles Robinson as Jollop
- Bill Sweek as Finnegan
- David Ogden Stiers as Pro Owner
- B.J. Merholz as Pro Lawyer
- I.J. Jefferson as Secretary
- Kenneth Payne as President Wallop
- Cathy Bradford as Rosemary
- Eric Johnson as Private First Class Johnson
- Cindy Williams as team manager's girlfriend

== Production ==
Filming of Drive, He Said took place on the campus of the University of Oregon and other nearby locations, all in Eugene, Oregon.

During a break in the filming of this movie, which he directed and which required a brief non-sexual nude scene for an actress, Jack Nicholson decided to operate his own personal casting couch to find the perfect girl. Nicholson had the most beautiful starlets in Hollywood come to his office and made each disrobe for him. Some were more eager than others, but all disrobed and endured Jack's near-medical examination. He saw more than 100 girls before he chose June Fairchild, an actress he had worked with before, and likely someone he had in mind for the part all along.

== Release ==
=== Censorship ===
The Motion Picture Association of America unsuccessfully attempted to grant the film an X rating due to its profanity and sexual content. Among the scenes criticized were several locker room sequences displaying full-frontal male nudity; a protracted sequence in which Margotta's character, Gabriel, goes streaking through the campus; and a sex scene in which Karen Black's character, Olive, has an orgasm.

=== Critical response ===
The film was entered into the 1971 Cannes Film Festival, where it encountered a stormy reception; The New York Times reported that the movie "set off the most violently negative reaction from an audience at the festival this year. As the lights came up, the people hooted, screamed and whistled. Some got to their feet and waved indignant fists toward where Nicholson and his two actors, William Tepper and Michael Margotta, were seated."

Roger Ebert of the Chicago Sun-Times gave the film three stars out of four and called it "a disorganized but occasionally brilliant movie," with the performances being "the best thing in the movie. Nicholson himself is a tremendously interesting screen actor, and he directs his actors to achieve a kind of intimacy and intensity that is genuinely rare. But if Nicholson is good on the nuances, he's weak on the overall direction of his film. It doesn't hang together for us as a unified piece of work." Vincent Canby of The New York Times wrote "It is not a great film, but it is an often intelligent one, and it is so much better than all of the rest of the campus junk Hollywood has manufactured that it can be indulged in its sentimental conventions." Gene Siskel of the Chicago Tribune gave the film his highest grade of four stars and wrote "The dialog and acting are of the highest calibre...The script respects each character, and the actors deliver fresh, unpredictable performances." Variety called it "an uneven film" with "a bombastic, racy, pellmell style touching on all that has gone before, but with a modern ring which may appeal to youthful audiences." Charles Champlin of the Los Angeles Times wrote of Nicholson's direction: "I think it is an unusually impressive debut. What is least surprising, I suppose, is that Nicholson works extremely well with his actors and has evoked several performances of outstanding quality." Gary Arnold of The Washington Post wrote "While it's not an untalented picture, it is an exasperating and finally insufferable one, because none of its potentially interesting themes or characters ever takes hold...For short periods of time it's possible to persuade yourself that something interesting might come of the athletic theme or the romantic theme or the political theme, but the movie never takes you up on it."

Pauline Kael, looking back on the film in 1978, called it "perhaps the most ambitious, chaotic, and daring of the counterculture films—it had a deranged, dissociated vitality. Though Nicholson couldn't pace it or bring it together, he did seem to have control of the actors, and you knew that nobody was just trying to charm you—they were all trying to get something new on the screen." A later assessment from Steven H. Scheuer found the film "utterly downbeat, and unfortunately dated". Leonard Maltin's home video guide awarded two-and-a-half stars out of four and found the film "confusing", and while he also praised the acting performances, he found that the film "loses itself in its attempt to cover all the bases".

The film holds a score of 57% on Rotten Tomatoes based on 14 reviews.

=== Home media ===
In 2010, the film was issued on DVD and Blu-ray by the Criterion Collection, as part of the "America Lost and Found" box set, which features a number of other films produced by BBS Productions, including Head (1968), Easy Rider (1969), Five Easy Pieces (1970), A Safe Place (1971), and The Last Picture Show (also 1971). Columbia TriStar Home Entertainment issued a standalone DVD as part of the Sony Pictures "Choice" Collection on June 4, 2013.

== See also ==
- List of basketball films

== Sources ==
- McDougal, Dennis (2008). Five Easy Decades: How Jack Nicholson Became the Biggest Movie Star in Modern Times. Hoboken, New Jersey: John Wiley & Sons. ISBN 978-0-471-72246-5.
