= Joshuah Bearman =

American journalist

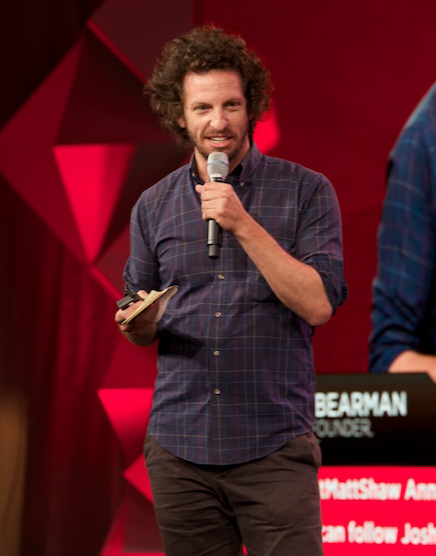
- Occupation: Journalist

Joshuah Bearman is an American journalist. He has written for Rolling Stone, Harper's, Wired, The New York Times Magazine, The Believer, and McSweeney's, and contributes to This American Life. Bearman was a contributing producer on the documentary, The King of Kong: A Fistful of Quarters. Bearman is an advisory board member of 826LA, a non-profit tutoring organization in Los Angeles. He lives in Los Angeles, California.

Several of Bearman's articles have been optioned for film and television adaptation. His 2007 Wired article about a CIA mission during the Iran Hostage Crisis was adapted as the 2012 film Argo, with George Clooney producing and Ben Affleck directing and starring. The screenplay, based on Bearman's article, won the Writer's Guild award for Best Adapted Screenplay, and the Academy Award for Best Adapted Screenplay. The film won the Golden Globe Award for Best Motion Picture – Drama at the Golden Globes, the BAFTA Award for Best Film, and Best Picture at the Academy Awards.

Bearman was nominated for a National Magazine Award in 2014 for his article, "Coronado High, the Story of America's First Drug Empire." It was co-published in GQ and Atavist. His writing has appeared in the Best American Non-Required Reading and Best American Technology Writing anthologies.

Bearman is a former staff writer and editor for the LA Weekly. He was one half of Team USA in Walleyball, a short film by Brent Hoff about a pick-up game of volleyball at the US-Mexico border. He was the editor-in-chief of Yeti Researcher, a journal in the field of cryptic hominid investigation, published by McSweeney's. He produced and directed McSweeney's Presents, a live comedy series, as a fundraiser for 826LA, a tutoring organization for children.

In 2014, Bearman co-founded Epic, a digital publication of narrative non-fiction and film and television production company.

== Works ==
=== Articles ===
- "The Untold Story of Silk Road," Part 1 & and Part 2, Wired, April/May 2015
- "Coronado High, the Story of America's First Drug Empire," GQ and The Atavist, July 2013
- "The Big Cigar: How a Hollywood producer smuggled Huey Newton to Cuba," Playboy, January 2013
- "The Baghdad Country Club, or Casablanca in the Green Zone," The Atavist, January 2012
- Bearman, Joshuah (March 22, 2010). "Art of the Steal: On the Trail of the World's Most Ingenious Thief". Wired.
- "The Legend of Master Legend," Rolling Stone, December 25, 2008
- "Mr. Romance," The Panorama, McSweeney's issue 33, 2010
- "Can D.I.Y. Replace The First Person Shooter?" The New York Times Magazine, November 15, 2009
- "My Half-Baked Futures Bubble", The New York Times Week in Review, December 9, 2009
- "The Perfect Game: Five Years With the Master of Pac-Man," Harper's, July 2008
- Bearman, Joshuah (April 24, 2007). "How the CIA Used a Fake Sci-Fi Flick to Rescue Americans From Tehran". Wired.
- "The Gospel According to Rio: Heaven's Gate, the Sequel," LA Weekly, March 27, 2007
- "Chest of Lies, or, The Door is the Party: Identity theft and the search for meaning at Sundance," LA Weekly, February 2, 2007
- "The Great Dome: Scenes from Mt. Wilson," LA Weekly, February 22, 2002
- "Xianjiang's Swarm of Giant Gerbils, an Investigation" McSweeney's, issue 14
- "Grass Roots Democracy Means Getting Some Manure on Your Boots: An Epic Tale of the 2004 Iowa Caucuses" The Believer, April 2004
- "The Uninhabited United States Army: Today's Unmanned Desert Race-Bots Are Tomorrow's War Machines" The Believer, May 2004
- "The Uninhabited United States Air Force: The Fever Dream of Military Planning" The Believer, August 2003
- "Total Information Awareness: An Interview with Usama Hayyad, Data Mining Pioneer" The Believer, August 2004
- "But Will it Bring Back the Dinosaurs? End Times at the Long Island's Relativistic Heavy Ion Collider, Part 1" "Part 2" "Part 3" McSweeneys, 2000
- "Unnatural History: Fake Fossils and Other Things in the Ground" McSweeney's, Issue 8
- "In a little valley in West Jerusalem: An interview with my father about the Dead Sea Scrolls" McSweeney's, Issue 4

=== This American Life ===
- This American Life Live at BAM!
- Episode 528: The Radio Drama Episode!
- Episode 500: 500!
- Episode 475: Send a Message
- Episode 323: The Super
- Episode 334: Duty Calls
- Episode 371: Scenes From a Mall
- Episode 447: The Incredible Case of the PI Moms
- Episode 475: Send a Message
