= Hearts and Minds (film) =

1974 American documentary film directed by Peter Davis

- Criterion Collection DVD Cover (first edition)
- Directed by: Peter Davis
- Produced by: Bert Schneider; Peter Davis
- Cinematography: Richard Pearce
- Edited by: Lynzee Klingman; Susan Martin
- Production companies: Rainbow Pictures Corporation; BBS Productions
- Distributed by: Warner Bros.
- Release date: November 12, 1974
- Running time: 112 minutes
- Country: United States
- Language: English
- Budget: $1 million

Hearts and Minds is a 1974 American documentary film about the Vietnam War directed by Peter Davis. The film's title is based on a quote from President Lyndon B. Johnson: "the ultimate victory will depend on the hearts and minds of the people who actually live out there". It won the Oscar for Best Documentary at the 47th Academy Awards presented in 1975.

The film premiered at the 1974 Cannes Film Festival. Commercial distribution was delayed in the United States due to legal issues, including a temporary restraining order obtained by one of the interviewees, former National Security Advisor Walt Rostow, who had claimed through his attorney that the film was "somewhat misleading" and "not representative" and that he had not been given the opportunity to approve the results of his interview. Columbia Pictures refused to distribute the picture, which forced the producers to purchase back the rights and release it by other means. The film was shown in Los Angeles for the one week it needed to be eligible for consideration in the 1974 Academy Awards.

In 2018, the film was selected for preservation in the National Film Registry by the Library of Congress as being "culturally, historically, or aesthetically significant."

== Featured individuals ==
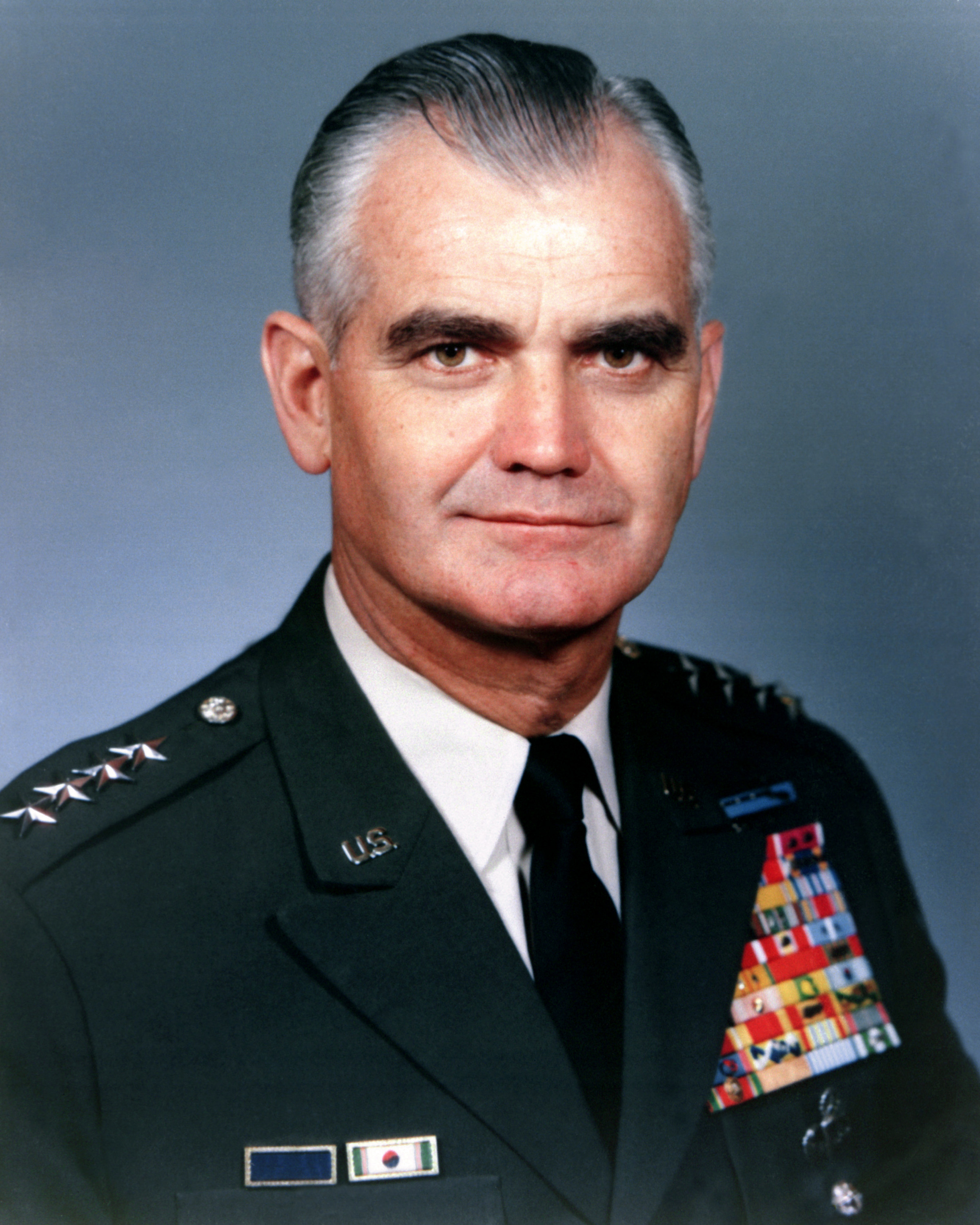
General William Westmoreland, United States Army Chief of Staff

A scene described as one of the film's "most shocking and controversial sequences" shows the funeral of a South Vietnamese soldier and his grieving family, as a sobbing woman is restrained from climbing into the grave after the coffin. The funeral scene is juxtaposed with an interview with General William Westmoreland—commander of American military operations in the Vietnam War at its peak from 1964 to 1968 and United States Army Chief of Staff from 1968 to 1972—telling a stunned Davis that "The Oriental doesn't put the same high price on life as does a Westerner. Life is plentiful. Life is cheap in the Orient." After an initial take, Westmoreland indicated that he had expressed himself inaccurately. After a second take ran out of film, the section was reshot for a third time, and it was the third take that was included in the film. Davis later reflected on this interview stating, "As horrified as I was when General Westmoreland said, 'The Oriental doesn’t put the same value on life,' instead of arguing with him, I just wanted to draw him out... I wanted the subjects to be the focus, not me as filmmaker."

The film also includes clips of George Thomas Coker, a United States Navy aviator held by the North Vietnamese as a prisoner of war for six and a half years, including more than two years spent in solitary confinement. One of the film's earliest scenes details a homecoming parade in Coker's honor in his hometown of Linden, New Jersey, where he tells the assembled crowd on the steps of city hall that, if the need arose, they must be ready to send him back to war. Answering a student's question about Vietnam at a school assembly, Coker responds that "If it wasn't [sic] for the people, it was very pretty. The people there are very backwards and primitive and they make mess out of everything." In a 2004 article on the film, Desson Thomson of The Washington Post comments on the inclusion of Coker in the film, noting that "When he does use people from the pro-war side, Davis chooses carefully." Time magazine's Stefan Kanfer noted the lack of balance in Coker's portrayal, "An ex-P.O.W.'s return to New Jersey is played against a background of red-white-and-blue-blooded patriots and wide-eyed schoolchildren. The camera, which amply records the agonies of South Vietnamese political prisoners, seems uninterested in the American lieutenant's experience of humiliation and torture."

The film also features Vietnam war veteran and anti-war activist Bobby Muller, who later founded the Vietnam Veterans of America.

Daniel Ellsberg, who had released the Pentagon Papers in 1971, discusses his initial gung-ho attitude toward the war in Vietnam.

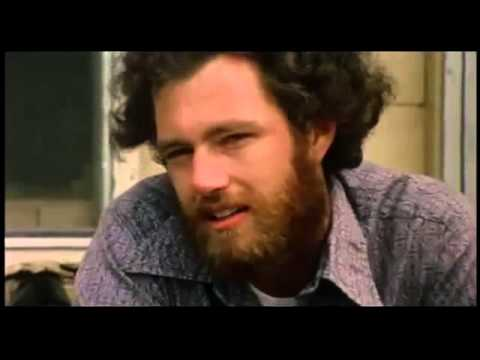
Former Captain Randy Floyd as he appears in Hearts and Minds.

The concluding interview features US Vietnam veteran Randy Floyd, stating "We've all tried very hard to escape what we have learned in Vietnam. I think Americans have worked extremely hard not to see the criminality that their officials and their policy makers exhibited."

The film includes images of Phan Thị Kim Phúc in sections of a film shot of the aftermath of a napalm attack which shows Phúc at about age nine running naked on the street after being severely burned on her back.

=== List of Interviewees ===
The following list excludes second appearances, and people who are uncredited: the latter include various presidents (Richard Nixon, John F. Kennedy, Lyndon B. Johnson, etc.) and Bob Hope:

- Clark Clifford - aide to Truman 1946-50, Secretary of Defense 1968-69
- John Foster Dulles - Secretary of State 1953-59
- Georges Bidault - French Foreign Minister 1954
- Lt. George Coker - Vietnam PoW 1966-73
- Walt Rostow - aide to Johnson and Kennedy
- Senator J. W. Fulbright - chairman of Foreign Relations Committee
- Former Cpt. Randy Floyd, USMC pilot
- Jerry Holter and Charles Hoey - USAF pilots
- J. Edgar Hoover
- Senator Joseph R. McCarthy
- Former Cpl. Stan Holder
- Former 1st Lt. Bobby Muller (now using a wheelchair)
- Kay Dvorshock - Bobby Muller's girlfriend
- Daniel Ellsberg - former aide Defense Dept. (Rand Corporation)
- General William Westmoreland - Commanding General Vietnam 1964-68
- Nguyen Van Toi - Vietnamese man
- Vo Thi Hue and Vo Thi Tu - Vietnamese sisters
- Father Chan Tin of Saigon
- Diem Chau - editor of Trinh Bay magazine
- David Emerson of Concord, Massachusetts - father of dead pilot
- Mui Duc Giang - Vietnamese coffin maker
- Former Specialist 5 Edward Sowders - army deserter
- Mrs Lora Sowders - mother of Edward Sowders
- Barton Osbern - former Army Intelligence Officer, CIA
- Sgt. George Trendell of Fort Dix New Jersey
- Thich Lieu Minh of the An Quang Pagoda, Saigon
- Former Sgt. William Marshall of Detroit
- Colonel George Patton IV (as "George Patton III")
- Duong Van Khai - refugee
- Nguyen Ngoc-Linh - chairman of Mekong Conglomerate, former Cabinet Minister in South Vietnam
- Mike Sulsana - amputee
- (voice of) I. F. Stone - journalist
- Senator Eugene McCarthy
- Senator Robert F. Kennedy
- Ngo Dinh Diem - President of South Vietnam 1955-63
- General Nguyen Khanh - President of South Vietnam 1964-65
- General Maxwell Taylor - ambassador to South Vietnam 1964-65
- Nguyen Thi Sau - former political prisoner (F)
- Ngo Ba Thanh - political prisoner
- Mary Cochran Emerson - mother of dead pilot
- Vu Duc Vinh - North Vietnamese bombing victim

== Critical reception ==
Hearts and Minds has attracted widely polarized opinions from film critics since its release. Reviewers commonly consider it either a masterpiece of political/documentary filmmaking or a propagandistic hatchet job on the Vietnam War, with some viewing it as both. A mixture of mostly contemporary film critic reviews on the review tallying website Rotten Tomatoes reports that 90% of the 40 film critic reviews they tallied were positive with an average critics score of 8.31 out of 10.

Vietnam War films from the 1960s to the 1970s reflected deep divisions at home over the war. Some reflected pro-war sentiments and vilified anti-war protesters, while others stood at the opposite end and criticized government officials and policies. Hearts and Minds was one of the first of the latter to be produced and released before the war's end in 1975.

Vincent Canby of The New York Times called the film an "epic documentary ... [that] recalls this nation's agonizing involvement in Vietnam, something you may think you know all about, including the ending. But you don't." Canby included the film among his ten best of 1975, calling it a "fine, complex, admittedly biased meditation upon American power" and a movie "that will reveal itself as one of the most all-encompassing records of the American civilization ever put into one film." Desson Thomson of The Washington Post described it as "one of the best documentaries ever made, a superb film about the thoughts and feelings of the era, the whole festering, spirited animus of it." Rex Reed called it that year's "best film at the Cannes Film Festival" and stated that "[t]his is the only film I have ever seen that sweeps away the gauze surrounding Vietnam and tells the truth." World Movies, the Australian subscription TV channel, included Hearts and Minds in its 2007 series of 25 Docs You Must See Before You Die.

Other reviewers have criticized the movie for bias. Roger Ebert for the Chicago Sun Times wrote in his three-star review: "Here is a documentary about Vietnam that doesn't really level with us ... If we know something about how footage is obtained and how editing can make points, it sometimes looks like propaganda ... And yet, in scene after scene, the raw material itself is so devastating that it brushes the tricks aside." Walter Goodman of The New York Times in an article titled False Art of the Propaganda Film, pointed out Davis' technique of showing only one side of the interview, pointing out that Walt Rostow's response may have been in response to "some provocation, a gesture, a facial expression, a turn of phrase" from his interrogator. He also criticized Shirley MacLaine's The Other Half of the Sky: A China Memoir, and Haskell Wexler's Introduction to the Enemy. Shirley MacLaine rejected the criticism in a published rejoinder.

David Dugas of United Press International, in a 1975 review printed in Pacific Stars and Stripes, said that "Davis' approach clearly is one-sided and is not likely to impress Vietnam hawks. But his film is brilliantly assembled, biting and informative."

M. Joseph Sobran, Jr. of the conservative magazine National Review, writing in 1975, called the film a "blatant piece of propaganda ... disingenuously one-sided ..." and went on to show the cinematic techniques used by the producers to achieve this effect.

Stefan Kanfer of Time magazine noted in 1975 that "Throughout, Hearts and Minds displays more than enough heart. It is mind that is missing. Perhaps the deepest flaw lies in the method: the Viet Nam War is too convoluted, too devious to be examined in a style of compilation without comment."

In 2002, David Ng wrote in Images: A Journal of Film and Popular Culture wrote: "The documentary is clearly anti-war in both tone and content."

== Academy Award ==
After Columbia Pictures refused to distribute the picture, producer Bert Schneider went to Henry Jaglom to purchase back the rights and released the film in March 1975 through Warner Bros. A planned December 18, 1974, opening in Los Angeles, California was canceled after the production company had been unable to pay the $1 million needed to buy the rights from Columbia Pictures. The film was ultimately shown in Los Angeles for the one week it needed to be eligible for consideration for the 1974 Academy Awards.

During his acceptance speech for the Academy Award for Best Documentary, Feature, on April 8, 1975, co-producer Bert Schneider said, "It's ironic that we're here at a time just before Vietnam is about to be liberated" and then read a telegram containing "Greetings of Friendship to all American People" from Ambassador Dinh Ba Thi of the Provisional Revolutionary Government (Viet Cong) delegation to the Paris Peace Accords. The telegram thanked the anti-war movement "for all they have done on behalf of peace". Frank Sinatra responded later in the evening by reading a letter from Bob Hope, another presenter on the show, which said: "The academy is saying, 'We are not responsible for any political references made on the program, and we are sorry they had to take place this evening.'"

== Legacy ==
The Academy Film Archive preserved Hearts and Minds in 2000.

Michael Moore has cited Hearts and Minds as the one film that inspired him to become a filmmaker, calling it "not only the best documentary I have ever seen...it may be the best movie ever". Many of the cinematic techniques used in Hearts and Minds are similar to Moore's 2004 documentary Fahrenheit 9/11.

Colin Jacobson wrote in his review of the movie for the DVD Movie Guide: "Probably the biggest criticism one can level at [Hearts and Minds] stems from its editorial bent. Without question, it takes the anti-war side of things, and one could argue it goes for a pro-Vietnamese bent as well....In the end, Hearts and Minds remains a flawed film that simply seems too one-sided for its own good."

In their 2014 book Cinematic Cold War: The American and Soviet Struggle for Hearts and Minds, the authors observe that Hearts and Minds, by accusing the U.S. of committing genocide in Vietnam, was among the films of that era that "challenged Cold War shibboleths head-on."

== See also ==
- List of American films of 1974
- Hearts and Minds (Vietnam)
