= Epic (magazine) =

American production and publishing company

Epic is a production and publishing company founded in 2013 by journalists Joshuah Bearman and Joshua Davis as a new venue for telling extraordinary true stories. Epic Magazine has achieved a number of entertainment deals in the film and television history .

On April 15, 2019, The Hollywood Reporter announced that the magazine was acquired by Vox Media.

In 2025, Epic Magazine co-produced the feature documentary Lilith Fair: Building a Mystery – The Untold Story, which reflects on the legacy of the all-female music festival.
