= The King of Marvin Gardens =

1972 film by Bob Rafelson

- US film poster
- Directed by: Bob Rafelson
- Screenplay by: Jacob Brackman
- Story by: Jacob Brackman; Bob Rafelson
- Produced by: Bob Rafelson
- Starring: Jack Nicholson; Bruce Dern; Ellen Burstyn; Julia Ann Robinson; Benjamin "Scatman" Crothers
- Cinematography: László Kovács
- Edited by: John F. Link
- Production company: BBS Productions
- Distributed by: Columbia Pictures
- Release date: October 12, 1972
- Running time: 103 minutes
- Country: United States
- Language: English
- Budget: $1 million

The King of Marvin Gardens is a 1972 American drama film. It stars Jack Nicholson, Bruce Dern, Ellen Burstyn, and Scatman Crothers. It is one of several collaborations between Nicholson and director Bob Rafelson. The majority of the film is set in a wintry Atlantic City, New Jersey, with cinematography by László Kovács.

The title alludes to the Marven Gardens in Margate, New Jersey, and one of the properties in the Monopoly board game, which was based on the streets of Atlantic City.

== Plot ==
David and Jason Staebler are brothers, the former a depressive living with his grandfather in Philadelphia, where he runs a late-night radio talk show, and the latter an extrovert con man working for gang boss Lewis in Atlantic City, where he lives with the manic depressive Sally, a former beauty queen and prostitute, and her stepdaughter Jessica, who entertains men alongside her stepmother. After no contact for 18 months, Jason asks David to come to Atlantic City for an opportunity to "make our fortune". David arrives and, after he is bailed out of jail, Jason persuades him to stay on in his hotel suite with the two women. He explains his scheme for a casino in Hawaii, and tells him that they will share the girls when they go there.

Tensions grow among the four as Jason seeks unsuccessfully to involve a Japanese syndicate of investors in his plans. The skeptical David has no faith in Jason's plan, while Jason chides David for wallowing in his dark, lonely depressed life. Jessica is being groomed for a beauty queen career by Sally in another improbable scheme but develops a mutual attraction with Jason. Sally, increasingly neurotic over losing her looks, burns her glamorous clothes, cuts off her hair and throws away her cosmetics. Jason starts packing to leave for Hawaii and tells Sally that he is going with Jessica and that she cannot come. Sally threatens to shoot David or Jason and, when Jason mocks her, shoots him dead in rage and despair. David escorts his brother's corpse home to Philadelphia by train.

== Cast ==
- Jack Nicholson - David Staebler
- Bruce Dern - Jason Staebler
- Ellen Burstyn - Sally
- Julia Anne Robinson - Jessica
- Benjamin "Scatman" Crothers - Lewis
- Charles LaVine - Grandfather
- Arnold Williams - Rosko
- John Ryan - Surtees
- Sully Boyar - Lebowitz
- Josh Mostel - Frank
- William Pabst - Bidlack

== Notable imagery ==
The film has several surreal scenes, including a conversation on horseback between David and Jason and a simulated Miss America pageant. The latter scene was filmed in the empty Atlantic City Convention Hall (now called Boardwalk Hall), which was at the time of its 1929 construction the largest clear-span covered space in the world. During the scene, Ellen Burstyn is shown playing the hall's historic pipe organ, which is the world's largest organ and reputedly the largest and loudest musical instrument ever built.

== Production ==
The King of Marvin Gardens was shot almost entirely on location in Atlantic City in the winter months of 1972. It is therefore of considerable historical significance as a visual record of the very last days of the city's "classic era" resort architecture. Many of the grand hotels shown in the film's exterior scenes were demolished during the next few years to make way for the new generation of casino-hotels that were built after the legalization of gambling. Filming took place only months before the vast Traymore Hotel was explosively demolished in April 1972, and the movie's main location, the once-opulent Marlborough-Blenheim Hotel was demolished in 1978 to make way for Bally's Atlantic City.

The portion of the film depicting Philadelphia was shot in Toronto. The apartment the Scatman Crothers character, Lewis, occupied is located at Jarvis and Isabella Streets in Toronto. It was in an old mansion that had been converted to apartments.

The title of the film (which originally was to be called The Philosopher King) is an ironic reference to the original version of the board game Monopoly, in which the main properties were named after locations in Atlantic City. This reference was also reflected in the film's original poster art.

According to actress Ellen Burstyn, who portrays Sally in the film, Jack Nicholson was originally cast as Jason and Bruce Dern as David. During rehearsal, director Bob Rafelson asked them to switch parts and liked the result. The actors agreed with the choice "because they were both parts that they weren't usually cast in", Burstyn said. "Especially Jack, to be cast as such an introvert ... that's not the usual Jack Nicholson role. ... And, of course, Bruce got to be the dominant brother, and that was fun for him."

The film was one of several collaborations between Nicholson and Rafelson, which included the Monkees film Head (1968) and Five Easy Pieces (1970), which established both men as major figures in Hollywood. Dern and Nicholson had previously worked together in Psych-Out (1968), The Rebel Rousers (1970), and Nicholson's directorial debut Drive, He Said (in which Dern co-starred, but Nicholson did not). Scatman Crothers co-starred, with Nicholson in the lead role, in Miloš Forman's One Flew Over the Cuckoo's Nest (1975) and Stanley Kubrick's The Shining (1980). Co-star Ellen Burstyn had worked on the TV series Gunsmoke, in which Dern had also appeared, and soon achieved fame with her starring role in William Friedkin's The Exorcist (1973).

The film was one of the few screen appearances made by Julia Anne Robinson (Jessica), who died in an apartment fire in Eugene, Oregon, in 1975, aged 24.

== Reception ==
Roger Ebert of the Chicago Sun-Times gave the film three stars out of four, calling it "an original, individual, and often frustrating movie that takes a lot of chances and wins on about sixty percent of them." Gene Siskel of the Chicago Tribune also awarded three stars out of four, writing that "much of the film doesn't work" but it "contains three of the best performances of the year."

Roger Greenspun of The New York Times panned the film, writing that "Rafelson's kind of poetic realism, an accuracy in the treatment of unexpected settings, looked like quality to some in Five Easy Pieces two years back. Now it looks like the most pretentious of clichés, a low-keyed but very empty bombast exploiting rather than exploring its themes of failed dreams and tawdry realities." Charles Champlin of the Los Angeles Times called it "a curious, stunningly cinematic, intricately structured, intensely atmospheric new film", adding, "There seems no end to the season's really extraordinary acting jobs and Marvin Gardens gives us five—count 'em five." Richard Combs of The Monthly Film Bulletin wrote "Brilliantly constructed by Rafelson and screenwriter Jacob Brackman as a fable of imperfect lives in which nothing ever comes to fruition, The King of Marvin Gardens creates a fragmented, incomplete puzzle (with visual and verbal puns slyly hinting that there might be a key), a game in which no one finally sweeps the board."

In a 1975 interview with television personality and publicist Elliot Mintz, Nicholson referred to his character David Staebler as his most memorable.

The King of Marvin Gardens holds a rating of 72% on Rotten Tomatoes, based on 32 reviews.

== See also ==
- List of American films of 1972
