= Five Easy Pieces =

1970 US drama film by Bob Rafelson

- Theatrical release poster
- Directed by: Bob Rafelson
- Screenplay by: Adrien Joyce
- Story by: Bob Rafelson; Adrien Joyce
- Produced by: Bob Rafelson; Richard Wechsler
- Starring: Jack Nicholson; Karen Black; Susan Anspach
- Cinematography: László Kovács
- Edited by: Christopher Holmes; Gerald Shepard
- Production companies: Five Easy Pieces Productions; BBS Productions
- Distributed by: Columbia Pictures
- Release dates: September 11, 1970 (New York Film Festival); September 12, 1970 (New York)
- Running time: 98 minutes
- Country: United States
- Language: English
- Budget: $1.6 million
- Box office: $18.1 million

Five Easy Pieces is a 1970 American road drama film directed by Bob Rafelson, written by Rafelson and Carole Eastman (as Adrien Joyce), and starring Jack Nicholson, Karen Black, Susan Anspach, Lois Smith, and Ralph Waite. The film tells the story of surly oil rig worker Bobby Dupea (Nicholson), whose rootless blue-collar existence belies his privileged youth as a piano prodigy. When Bobby learns that his father is dying, he travels to his family home in Washington to visit him, taking along his uncouth girlfriend (Black).

The film was nominated for four Academy Awards and five Golden Globe Awards, and was selected for preservation in the National Film Registry of the Library of Congress in 2000 upon being deemed "culturally, historically, or aesthetically significant".

== Plot ==
Bobby Dupea works in an oil field in Kern County, California. He spends most of his time with his girlfriend Rayette DiPesto, a waitress who has dreams of singing country music, or with fellow oil worker Elton, with whom he bowls, gets drunk, and philanders.

When Bobby gets Rayette pregnant and Elton is arrested, Bobby quits his job and goes to Los Angeles, where his sister Partita is making a classical piano recording. She tells Bobby, who was once also a pianist, that their father has suffered two strokes, and urges him to reconcile with the family at their home in Washington.

Rayette threatens to kill herself if Bobby leaves her, so he reluctantly asks her along. Driving north, they pick up Terry and Palm, two stranded women headed for Alaska. The latter launches into a monologue about the evils of consumerism. The four are thrown out of a diner after Bobby argues with an obstinate waitress over his order. Bobby drops off Terry and Palm when they get to Washington.

Ashamed to introduce Rayette to his upper-class family, Bobby registers her in a motel before driving alone to the family home on an island in Puget Sound. He finds Partita giving their father a haircut; the old man seems completely oblivious to him. At dinner, Bobby meets Catherine Van Oost, a young pianist studying under and engaged to his amiable brother Carl, a violinist. Despite personality differences, Catherine and Bobby are immediately attracted to each other. Learning that Bobby was once a pianist, she asks him to play for her. She is moved by his rendition of Frédéric Chopin's Prelude, Op. 28, No. 4, but Bobby dismisses her, insisting that he played with "no inner feeling". Angered by Bobby's rejection, she leaves, but he follows after her and they have sex in her room.

Rayette runs out of money at the motel and comes to the Dupea estate unannounced. Her presence creates an awkward situation, but when intellectual family friend Samia Glavia ridicules her, Bobby comes to her defense. Storming out of the room in search of Catherine, he discovers his father's male nurse giving Partita a sensual massage. He picks a fight with the nurse, who subdues him after a short struggle.

Bobby tries to persuade Catherine to go away with him, but she declines, telling him he cannot ask for love when he does not love himself, or anything at all. After tearfully confessing his regrets to his unresponsive father, Bobby leaves for California with Rayette. Shortly into the trip, they stop for gas and coffee; while Rayette's view is obstructed, Bobby hitches a ride on a truck headed north.

== Cast ==
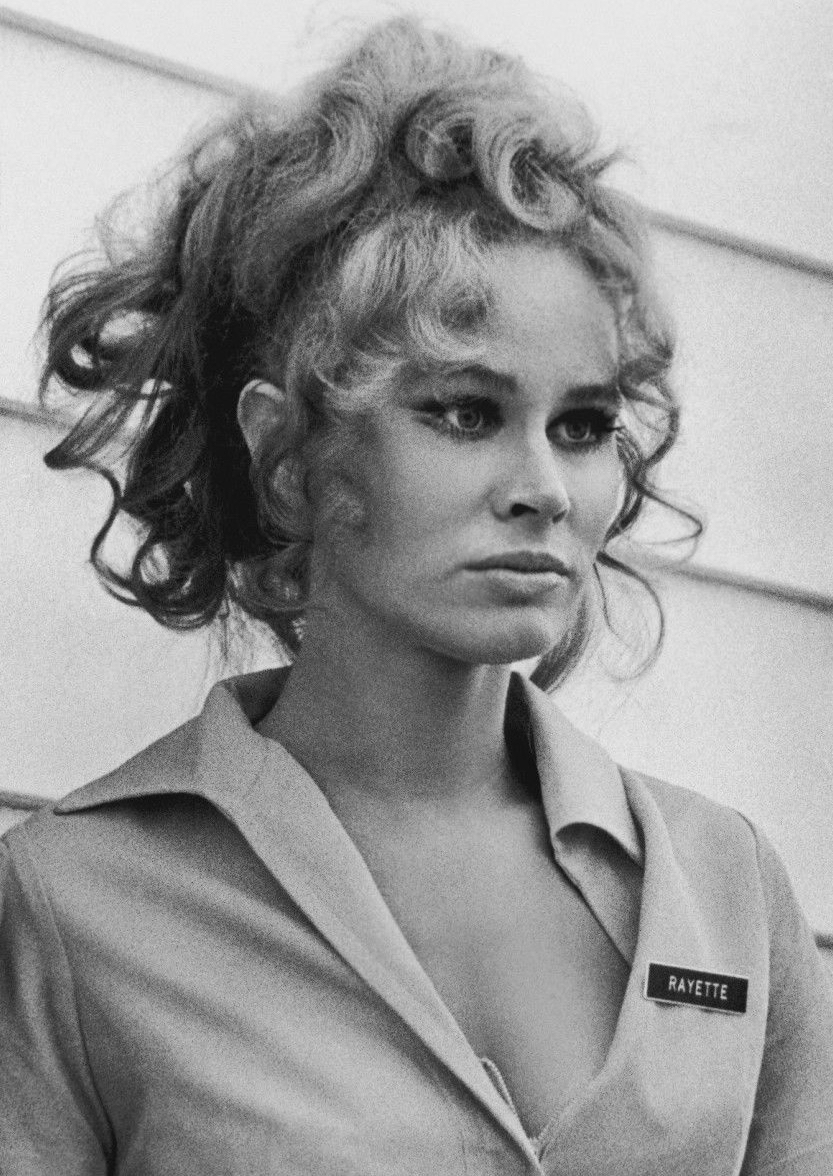
Karen Black as Rayette

- Jack Nicholson as Robert "Bobby" Eroica Dupea
- Karen Black as Rayette DiPesto
- Susan Anspach as Catherine Van Oost
- Lois Smith as Partita Dupea
- Ralph Waite as Carl Fidelio Dupea
- Billy "Green" Bush as Elton
- Irene Dailey as Samia Glavia
- Toni Basil as Terry Grouse
- Helena Kallianiotes as Palm Apodaca
- William Challee as Nicholas Dupea
- John Ryan as Spicer
- Fannie Flagg as "Stoney"
- Marlena MacGuire as "Twinky"
- Sally Ann Struthers as Shirley "Betty"
- Lorna Thayer as Waitress
- Richard Stahl as Recording Engineer

== Production ==
While the film's earlier scenes were shot in California, the majority was filmed in the Pacific Northwest. Filming primarily occurred on Vancouver Island in British Columbia, with additional photography occurring in Florence and Portland, Oregon. The diner sequence, in which Robert pesters an obstinate waitress, was filmed at a Denny's along Interstate 5 near Eugene, Oregon. Screenwriter Carole Eastman based the scene on a real incident she witnessed at Pupi's Bakery and Sidewalk Café on the Sunset Strip, where an aggrieved Nicholson pushed all the plates and cups off of a table, and on Rafelson frequently asking for substitutions at restaurants.

To prepare for his role, Jack Nicholson undertook piano lessons from Polish concert pianist Josef Pacholczyk.

In 2022, Sally Struthers revealed on actor Gilbert Gottfried's podcast that Rafelson had coerced her into appearing nude on set against her stated wishes, and made a false promise that she would not appear nude in the final cut.

== Music ==
The opening credits list the five classical piano pieces played in the film and referenced in the title. Pearl Kaufman is credited as the pianist.

- Frédéric Chopin, Fantaisie in F minor, Op. 49, played by Bobby on the back of a moving truck
- Johann Sebastian Bach, Chromatic Fantasia and Fugue, BWV 903, played by Partita in a recording studio
- Wolfgang Amadeus Mozart, Piano Concerto No. 9 in E-flat major, K. 271, played by Carl and Catherine upon Bobby's arrival at the house
- Chopin, Prelude in E minor, Op. 28, No. 4, played by Bobby for Catherine
- Mozart, Fantasy in D minor, K. 397

Also included in the film are four songs by Tammy Wynette: "Stand by Your Man", "D-I-V-O-R-C-E", "Don't Touch Me", and "When There's a Fire in Your Heart".

== Release ==
The film was shown at the New York Film Festival on September 11, 1970. It opened commercially on September 12 at the Coronet Theatre in New York.

=== Box office ===
"The last sequence is of the finest quality. Bobby decides to leave both girlfriend and family and abandon life entirely...a truck driver gives him a ride to a place where 'it is very cold': the country of death. Rafelson and his cameraman László Kovács fix the scene in our minds forever: the filling station and its discreet restroom; the grey surrounding buildings; the dripping autumnal vegetation of the Pacific Northwest; the parked truck waiting to go to Alaska; the face of Nicholson, already aging and filled with premonitory shadows, fixed behind the windshield. Religion, love and family have all failed to work, leaving absolutely nothing at the end but a journey to nowhere."

— Biographer Charles Higham in The Art of the American Cinema: 1900-1971.

In the film's opening weekend at the Coronet, it grossed $10,476. It grossed $36,710 in its first week. After ten weeks of release, it reached number one at the US box office.

The film earned $1.2 million in the United States in 1970. By 1976, it had earned $8.9 million in the United States and Canada.

=== Critical response ===
Five Easy Pieces opened to positive reviews. It currently holds an 89% positive rating on online review aggregator Rotten Tomatoes, based on 55 reviews, with an average rating of 8.60/10. The site's consensus states: "An important touchstone of the New Hollywood era, Five Easy Pieces is a haunting portrait of alienation that features one of Jack Nicholson's greatest performances."

Roger Ebert gave the film four out of four stars, describing it as "one of the best American films" and "a masterpiece of heartbreaking intensity", and deeming Bobby Dupea "one of the most unforgettable characters in American movies." Ebert named it the best film of 1970, and later added it to his "Great Movies" list.

In a mixed review, critic John Simon criticized the film for "pretentiousness" but praised the performances of Karen Black, Lois Smith, and Billy Green Bush.

The February 2020 issue of New York magazine listed Five Easy Pieces among "The Best Movies That Lost Best Picture at the Oscars."

In a 2022 retrospective review, Polish writer Jacek Szafranowicz called the film "flawless" and "one of the masterpieces of the New Hollywood era".

=== Accolades ===
Award	Category	Nominee(s)	Result	Ref.
Academy Awards	Best Picture	Bob Rafelson and Richard Wechsler	Nominated	
Academy Awards	Best Actor	Jack Nicholson	Nominated	
Academy Awards	Best Supporting Actress	Karen Black	Nominated	
Academy Awards	Best Original Screenplay	Adrien Joyce and Bob Rafelson	Nominated	
Directors Guild of America Awards	Outstanding Directorial Achievement in Motion Pictures	Bob Rafelson	Nominated	
Fotogramas de Plata	Best Foreign Movie Performer	Jack Nicholson (also for Chinatown)	Won	
Golden Globe Awards	Best Motion Picture – Drama		Nominated	
Golden Globe Awards	Best Actor in a Motion Picture – Drama	Jack Nicholson	Nominated	
Golden Globe Awards	Best Supporting Actress – Motion Picture	Karen Black	Won (Note: Tied with Maureen Stapleton for Airport.)	
Golden Globe Awards	Best Director – Motion Picture	Bob Rafelson	Nominated	
Golden Globe Awards	Best Screenplay – Motion Picture	Adrien Joyce and Bob Rafelson	Nominated	
Kansas City Film Circle Critics Awards	Best Film		Won (Note: Tied with Patton.)	
Laurel Awards	Best Picture		Nominated	
Laurel Awards	Top Male Dramatic Performance	Jack Nicholson	Nominated	
Laurel Awards	Top Female Supporting Performance	Karen Black	Nominated	
Laurel Awards	Top Female Supporting Performance	Lois Smith	Nominated	
Laurel Awards	Top Cinematographer	László Kovács	Nominated	
Laurel Awards	Star of Tomorrow – Female	Susan Anspach	Nominated	
Laurel Awards	Star of Tomorrow – Female	Karen Black	Nominated	
Nastro d'Argento	Best Foreign Director	Bob Rafelson	Nominated	
National Board of Review Awards	Top Ten Films		4th Place	
National Board of Review Awards	Best Supporting Actress	Karen Black	Won	
National Film Preservation Board	National Film Registry		Inducted	
New York Film Critics Circle Awards	Best Film		Won	
New York Film Critics Circle Awards	Best Director	Bob Rafelson	Won	
New York Film Critics Circle Awards	Best Actor	Jack Nicholson	Runner-up	
New York Film Critics Circle Awards	Best Actress	Karen Black	Runner-up	
New York Film Critics Circle Awards	Best Supporting Actress	Karen Black	Won	
New York Film Critics Circle Awards	Best Supporting Actress	Lois Smith	Nominated	
Writers Guild of America Awards	Best Drama – Written Directly for the Screen	Adrien Joyce and Bob Rafelson	Nominated	

=== Home media ===
Five Easy Pieces was released on VHS by RCA/Columbia Pictures Home Video in 1988.

On November 16, 1999, Columbia TriStar Home Video released the film on two-sided DVD-Video, featuring both fullscreen (4:3) and widescreen formats.

Grover Crisp of Sony Pictures conducted a 4K restoration of the film, which was screened in DCP in 2012.

The film was released on DVD and Blu-ray by The Criterion Collection in November 2010 as part of the box set America Lost and Found: The BBS Story. This release includes audio commentary by Rafelson and interior designer Toby Rafelson; Soul Searching in "Five Easy Pieces", a 2009 video piece with Rafelson; BBStory, a 2009 documentary about Raybert/BBS Productions, with Rafelson, Nicholson, Black, Burstyn, Peter Bogdanovich, and Henry Jaglom, among others; and audio excerpts from a 1976 AFI interview with Rafelson. On June 30, 2015, the film was released as a stand-alone DVD and Blu-ray by the Criterion Collection.

== See also ==
- List of cult films
