= Brenda Sykes =

American actress (born 1949)

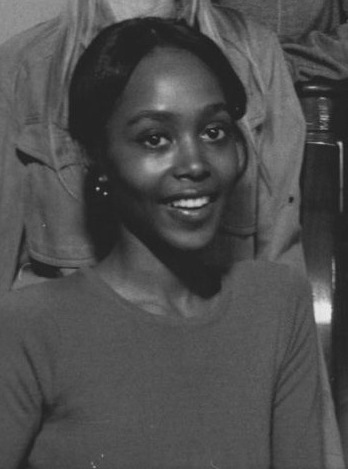
- Sykes in a publicity photo for television series Ozzie's Girls, c. 1972
- Born: June 25, 1949 (age 77); Shreveport, Louisiana, U.S.
- Education: Susan Miller Dorsey High School
- Occupation: Actress
- Years active: 1968–1978
- Spouse: Gil Scott-Heron (m. 1978–1987)
- Children: 1

Brenda Sykes (born June 25, 1949) is an American former actress who made a number of films and appeared in television series in the 1970s. She was discovered on The Dating Game.

== Life and career ==
Born in Shreveport, Louisiana, and raised in Los Angeles, Sykes is the daughter of a postal worker. She attended Susan Miller Dorsey High School, graduating in 1967, following which she spent two years at UCLA, with a major in political science and minor in French. On the recommendation of producer Aaron Spelling, she attended the Professional Theatre Workshop in Los Angeles for six months.

Aaron Spelling, the producer, told me to go to the workshop. I auditioned for a part and he said I wasn't ready for it. So I went and was taught how to kiss, take punches, and burst into tears at a moment's notice.

Sykes later continued her studies with actor Jeff Corey.

Sykes played Jim Brown's love interest in Black Gunn. According to Brown, he was responsible for her being cast in the role, an effort he made because he was attracted to her in real life. From 1973 to 1974, she co-starred on Ozzie's Girls as a college student boarding with Ozzie and Harriet Nelson.

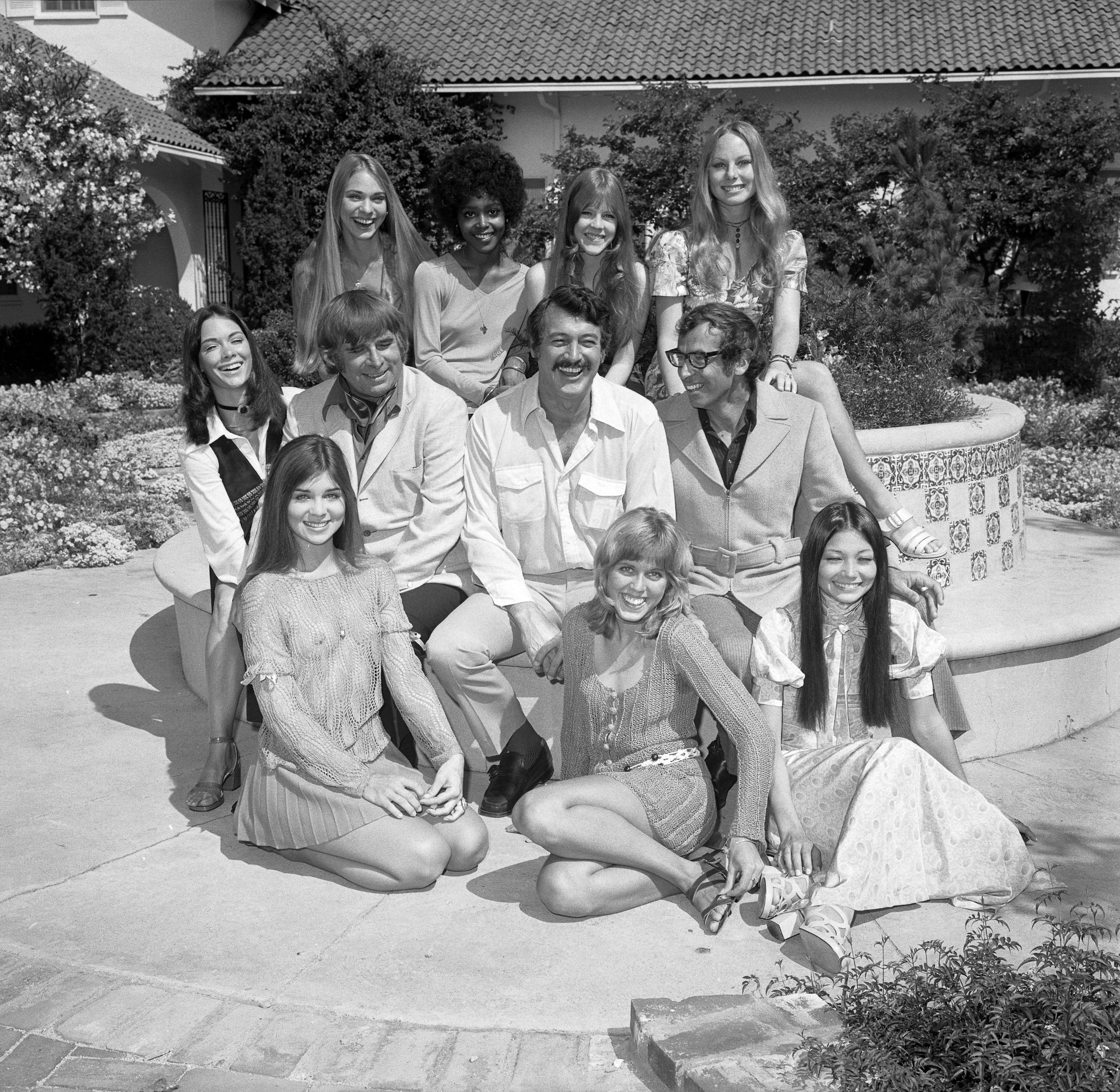
Cast of Pretty Maids All in a Row (L-R): June Fairchild, Joy Bang, Aimee Eccles; (middle row) Joanna Cameron, Gene Roddenberry (writer), Rock Hudson, Roger Vadim (director); (back row) Margaret Markov, Brenda Sykes, Diane Sherry, Gretchen Burrell

She played the character Mandy, one of Jimmie Walker's girlfriends on the 1970s sitcom Good Times, made a starring role appearance on the first season of The Streets of San Francisco, and as Summer Johnson on the CBS series Executive Suite.

== Personal life ==
Sykes was married to musician Gil Scott-Heron from 1978 to 1987 and is the mother of poet Gia Scott-Heron. "She was exquisitely beautiful, soft and refined. He was so full of fire, and she was the opposite. She was the water in his life," said the filmmaker Esther Anderson.

== Filmography ==
| Year | Title | Role | Notes |
|---|---|---|---|
| 1970 | The Liberation of L.B. Jones | Jelly | |
| 1970 | Getting Straight | Luan | |
| 1970 | The Baby Maker | Francis | Uncredited |
| 1971 | Pretty Maids All in a Row | Pamela | |
| 1971 | The Sheriff | Janet Wilder | ABC Movie of the Week |
| 1971 | Skin Game | Naomi | |
| 1971 | Honky | Sheila Smith | |
| 1972 | Black Gunn | Judith | |
| 1973 | Cleopatra Jones | Tiffany | |
| 1975 | Mandingo | Ellen | |
| 1976 | Drum | Calinda | |

== Television ==
| Year | Title | Role | Notes |
|---|---|---|---|
| 1968 | One Life to Live | Judy Tate | |
| 1969 | Mayberry R.F.D. | Dorothy June | episode "Driver Education" |
| 1969 | The New People | Barbara | episode #1.0 |
| 1969 | Room 222 | Elaine Harris | episode "Triple Date" |
| 1969 | The Bold Ones: The New Doctors | Janet | episode "Crisis" (uncredited) |
| 1971 | The Doris Day Show | Dulcie | episode "Young Love" (unsold TV pilot) |
| 1972 | Love, American Style | Sally Wilson | episode "Love and the Perfect Wedding" |
| 1973 | The Streets of San Francisco | Jenaea Dancy | episode "A Trout in the Milk" |
| 1973 | Ozzie's Girls | Brenda MacKenzie | 24 episodes |
| 1974 | Police Woman | Linda Daniels | episode "Smack" |
| 1975 | Harry O | Ruthie Daniels | episode "Sound of Trumpets" |
| 1975 | Mobile One | Wilma | episode "Roadblock" |
| 1976–1977 | Executive Suite | Summer Johnson | 18 episodes |
| 1977 | The Love Boat | Ginny O'Brien | episode "Captain & the Lady" |
| 1978 | Good Times | Mandy | episode "Where There's Smoke" |
