= Joanna Cameron =

American actress and model (1948–2021)

JoAnna Cameron
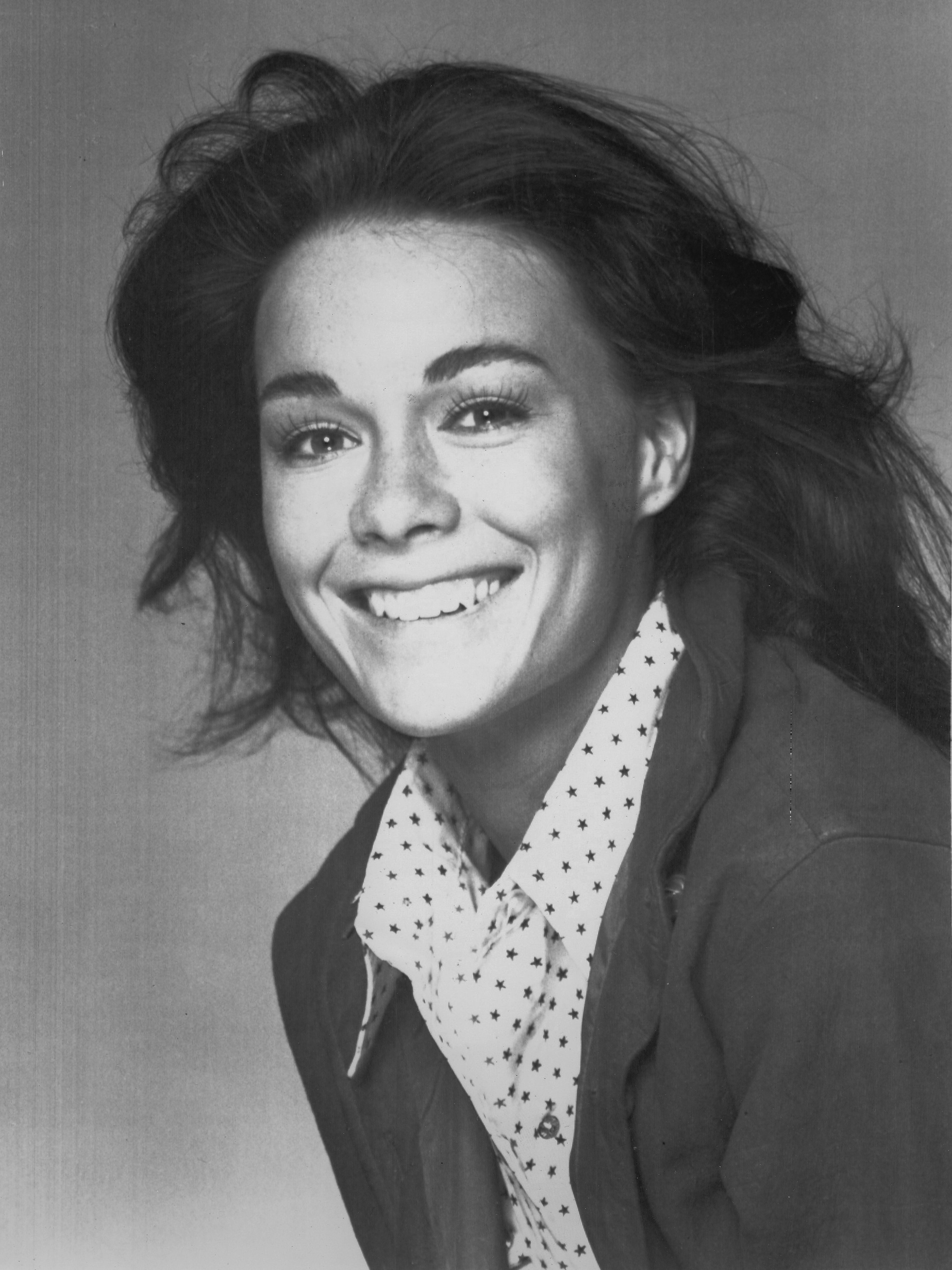
- Cameron, c. 1972
- Born: Patricia Kara Cameron; September 20, 1948; Greeley, Colorado, U.S.
- Died: October 15, 2021 (aged 73); Oahu, Hawaii, U.S.
- Education: Greeley Central High School; University of California, Riverside
- Occupations: Actress; model; nurse
- Years active: 1969–1980
- Known for: The Secrets of Isis; The Great American Beauty Contest; Spider-Man Strikes Back; B.S. I Love You; Shazam!

Patricia Kara Cameron (September 20, 1948 – October 15, 2021), sometimes credited as JoAnna Cameron, was an American actress and model, perhaps best known for her portrayal of the title role on Isis, a 1970s television series, which was later rebroadcast as The Secrets of Isis.

== Career ==
=== Early career ===
While at college, Cameron became friends with Linda Hope, the daughter of Bob Hope. When she was introduced to the famous comedian, he cast her in the film How to Commit Marriage in 1969. This led to a series of film and television roles throughout the 1970s. Cameron was reportedly considered for the Love Story role that went to Ali MacGraw. She acted in the 1970s films B.S. I Love You and the black comedy Pretty Maids All in a Row.

Her television performances also included roles in The Bold Ones: The New Doctors, Columbo, and several episodes of Marcus Welby, MD. She also had a prolific career in commercials and claimed at one time to have held the record for having done the most commercials in the Guinness Book of World Records.

=== The Secrets of Isis ===
In 1975, Cameron was cast as the title character in the Saturday morning children's series Isis. In the series, Cameron portrayed a young high-school science teacher named Andrea Thomas who discovers an enchanted amulet while in Egypt. The amulet, which originally belonged to the ancient Egyptian pharaoh Queen Hatshepsut and also intended for Hatshepsut's (female) descendants (including Thomas herself), bestows the supposed powers of the goddess Isis on her when she invokes them by uttering the phrase, "O mighty Isis!" These powers include super-human strength and speed ("the speed of gazelles"), the ability to fly (or to "soar as the falcon soars"), and telekinesis ("command [of] the elements of sky and Earth"), all of which she uses to fight crime.

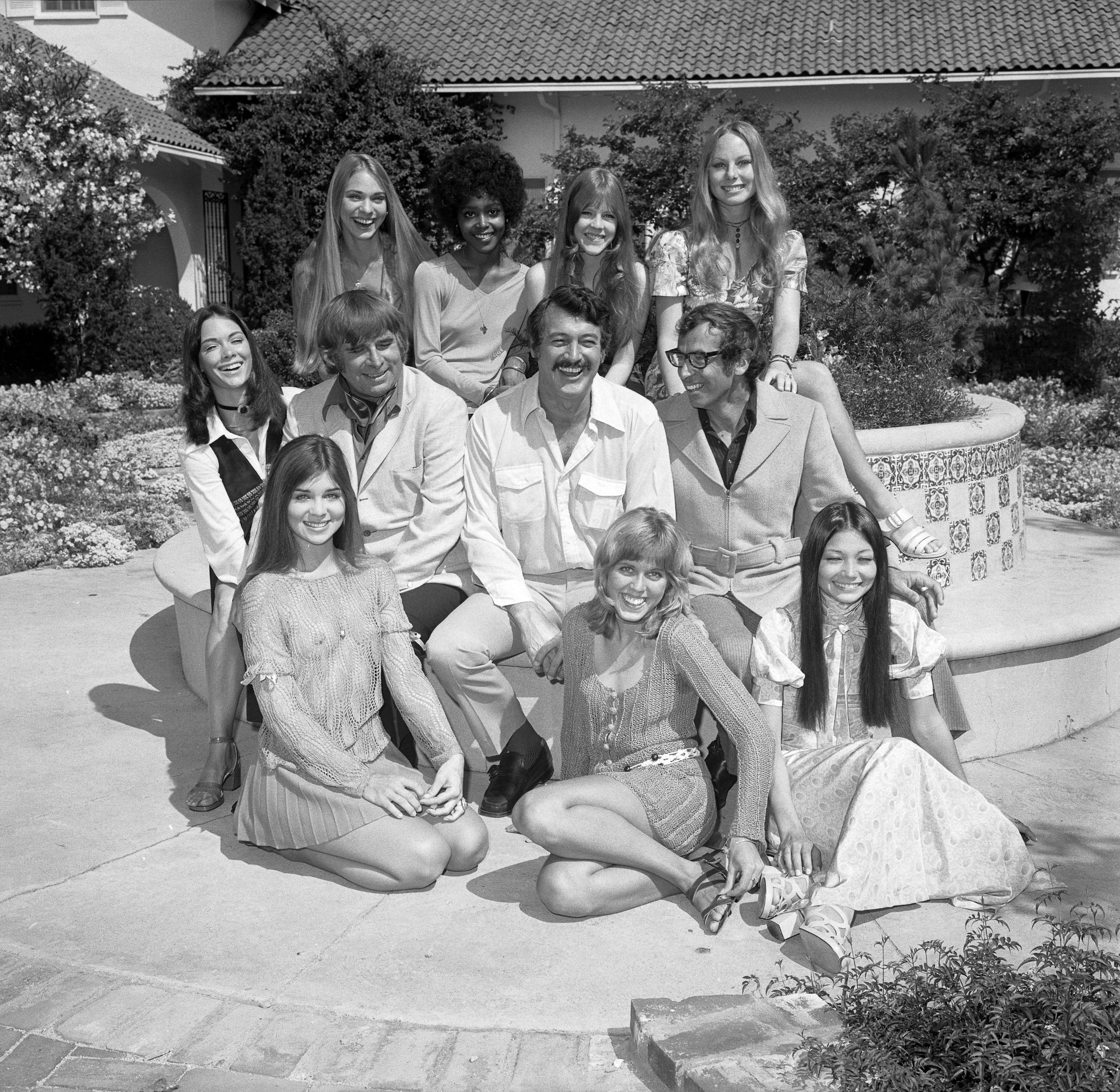
Cast of Pretty Maids All in a Row (L-R): (front row) June Fairchild, Joy Bang, Aimee Eccles; (middle row) Joanna Cameron, Gene Roddenberry, Rock Hudson, Roger Vadim; (back row) Margaret Markov, Brenda Sykes, Diane Sherry, Gretchen Burrell

Isis ran from September 6, 1975, to September 3, 1977. Twenty-two episodes were produced, and Isis also appeared in three episodes of the related Saturday morning super-hero drama Shazam!. Despite the show's popularity, it was not renewed for a third season. When the show went into syndication in 1978, it was renamed The Secrets of Isis. The character of Isis later appeared in a cartoon called Tarzan and the Super 7, in segments dealing with a super-team called "The Freedom Force," but with Isis's voice provided by Diane Pershing.

=== Later career ===
After her role as Isis, Cameron played television roles in McMillan & Wife and The Amazing Spider-Man. She also was host of the Navy Network, a TV series produced by the United States Navy about aspects of naval life, and directed a commercial for the Naval Academy titled Razor Sharp.

In the late 1970s, Cameron was cited in the Guinness Book of World Records as having appeared in more TV commercials than anyone else, 105. Merv Griffin once quipped that her commercials, strung together, would run for 150 hours. According to TV Guide, advertisers "have spent more than $100 million using JoAnna as the beauteous centerpiece of their commercials for cosmetics, shampoo, wine, beer, panty hose and breath freshener, among other things."

Cameron's last-known role was in the 1980 TV movie Swan Song.

Following her acting career, Cameron worked in the home healthcare industry as a nurse for 10 years, and followed that with a career in marketing for several hotels.

== Death ==
Joanna Pang Atkins, who played Cindy Lee on The Secrets of Isis, announced that Cameron died in Oahu, Hawaii, due to complications from a stroke on October 15, 2021.

== Filmography ==
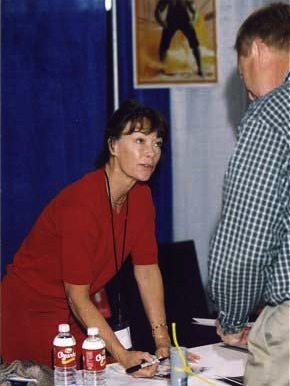
Joanna Cameron in 2006

Television
Year	Title	Role	Notes
1969	The Bold Ones: The New Doctors	Jan Speiser	Episode: "Man Without a Heart"
1969	Medical Center	Lainie Jeffries	Episode: "Jeopardy"
1969	Daniel Boone	Kellie	Episode: "A Bearskin For Jamie Blue"
1969	The Last of the Powerseekers	Belinda Hastings	TV movie
1970	The Name of the Game	Carole Crown	Episode: "Echo of a Nightmare"
1970	Marcus Welby, M.D.	Nurse Anne MacAndrews	3 episodes: "Fun and Games and Michael Ambrose". Nobody Wants a Fat Jockey" and "The Other Side of the Chart"
1971	Love, American Style	Pamela Cochran	Segment: "Love and the Eyewitness"
1971	The Bob Hope Special	Native American Maiden	co-starred with John Wayne
1971	The Partners	Sgt. Kelly	Episode: "Have I Got an Apartment for You!"
1972	Marcus Welby, M.D.	Carolyn Kingsley	Episode: "A Fragile Possession"
1972	Search	Laura Day	Episode: "Flight To Nowhere"
1973	The Great American Beauty Contest	Gloria Rockwell, Miss Oklahoma	ABC Movie of the Week
1973	A Time for Love	Mini	TV movie
1974	Sorority Kill	Diane	TV movie
1974	Night Games	Thelma Lattimer	TV movie; Pilot for Petrocelli TV Series
1974	Columbo	Lorna McGrath	Episode: "Negative Reaction"
1974	It Couldn't Happen to a Nicer Guy	Wanda Olivia Wellman	ABC Movie of the Week
1975	Switch	Jenny Brown	Episode: "Death By Resurrection"
1975	The Dyn–O–Mite CBS Saturday Preview Special	Isis	
1975–1977	The Secrets of Isis	Isis / Andrea Thomas	22 episodes
1975	Shazam!	Isis / Andrea Thomas	Episode: "The Odd Couple"
1976	Hey, Hey, Hey, It's The CBS Saturday Preview Special	Isis	co-starring John Davey as Captain Marvel.
1976	Shazam!	Isis / Andrea Thomas	Episode: "Finders Keepers"
1976	Shazam!	Isis / Andrea Thomas	Episode: "Out of Focus"
1976	High Risk	Sandra	TV movie
1977	McMillan	Vanessa Vale	Episode: "Have You Heard About Vanessa?"
1978	Switch	Jenny Brown	Episode: "The Cage"
1978	The Amazing Spider-Man	Gale Hoffman	Episode: "The Deadly Dust, Parts 1 & 2"
1980	Swan Song	Karen	TV movie
1999	VH-1 Where Are They Now?	Self	Episode: "Superheroes"

Films
Year	Title	Role	Notes
1969	How to Commit Marriage	Nancy Benson	
1970	I Love My Wife	Nurse Sharon	
1971	Pretty Maids All in a Row	Yvonne Millick	Screenplay by Gene Roddenberry; directed by Roger Vadim
1971	B.S. I Love You	Marilyn / Michelle	

== Awards and nominations ==
Year	Award	Category	Nominated work	Result
1972	Photoplay Awards	Gold Medal Favorite Female Star		Nominated
