= Pretty Maids All in a Row =

1971 film by Roger Vadim

- Theatrical release poster
- Directed by: Roger Vadim
- Screenplay by: Gene Roddenberry
- Based on: Pretty Maids All in a Row by Francis Pollini
- Produced by: Gene Roddenberry
- Starring: Rock Hudson; Angie Dickinson; Telly Savalas; Roddy McDowall; Keenan Wynn
- Cinematography: Charles Rosher, Jr.
- Edited by: Bill Brame
- Music by: Lalo Schifrin
- Production company: Metro-Goldwyn-Mayer
- Distributed by: Metro-Goldwyn-Mayer
- Release date: March 24, 1971 (Atlanta)
- Running time: 91 minutes
- Country: United States
- Language: English

Pretty Maids All in a Row is a 1971 American sexploitation mystery film directed by Roger Vadim and starring Rock Hudson, Angie Dickinson, Telly Savalas, Roddy McDowall, and Keenan Wynn. Based on the 1968 novel of the same name by Francis Pollini, the film focuses on a high school where female students are being targeted by an unknown serial killer.

== Plot ==
At Oceanfront High School, female students are being targeted by a serial killer. Ponce, a male student is experiencing sexual frustration, surrounded by a seemingly unending stream of beautiful and provocative classmates. Michael "Tiger" McDrew is the high school's football coach and guidance counselor, who has frequent sexual encounters with different female students.

Ponce develops a crush on substitute teacher Miss Smith as he presents his report on John Milton's Paradise Lost. Tiger tries to help Ponce deal with his sexual needs by encouraging him to approach Miss Smith. Ponce tells him he constantly has an erection when talking to an attractive woman. Tiger talks to Miss Smith and recommends that she teach Ponce to build confidence, telling her he's impotent.

Miss Smith takes Ponce home after school and arouses him by reading Milton's poetry. Ponce hides in the closet, but Miss Smith tells him that she knows about his sexual problem and wants to help. Seeing his erection through his trousers, she reports to Tiger in school the next day that she believes she's made progress. Tiger urges Miss Smith to be more aggressive at their next meeting. Ponce visits Miss Smith and gifts her a liquor-filled chocolate duck, then becomes nervous and leaves. When he returns to retrieve his keys, he finds Miss Smith in a sexy nightgown. They kiss passionately and have sex.

Detective Sam Surcher of the state police, investigating the murders, suspects Tiger is the killer. Ponce finds evidence against Tiger in his office. Tiger confesses to Ponce on a pier, then drives his car into the ocean. When his body is never recovered, Surcher suspects that Tiger has faked his suicide.

After Tiger's memorial service, a much more confident Ponce flirts with several female students, taking one for a ride on his motorcycle.

== Cast ==
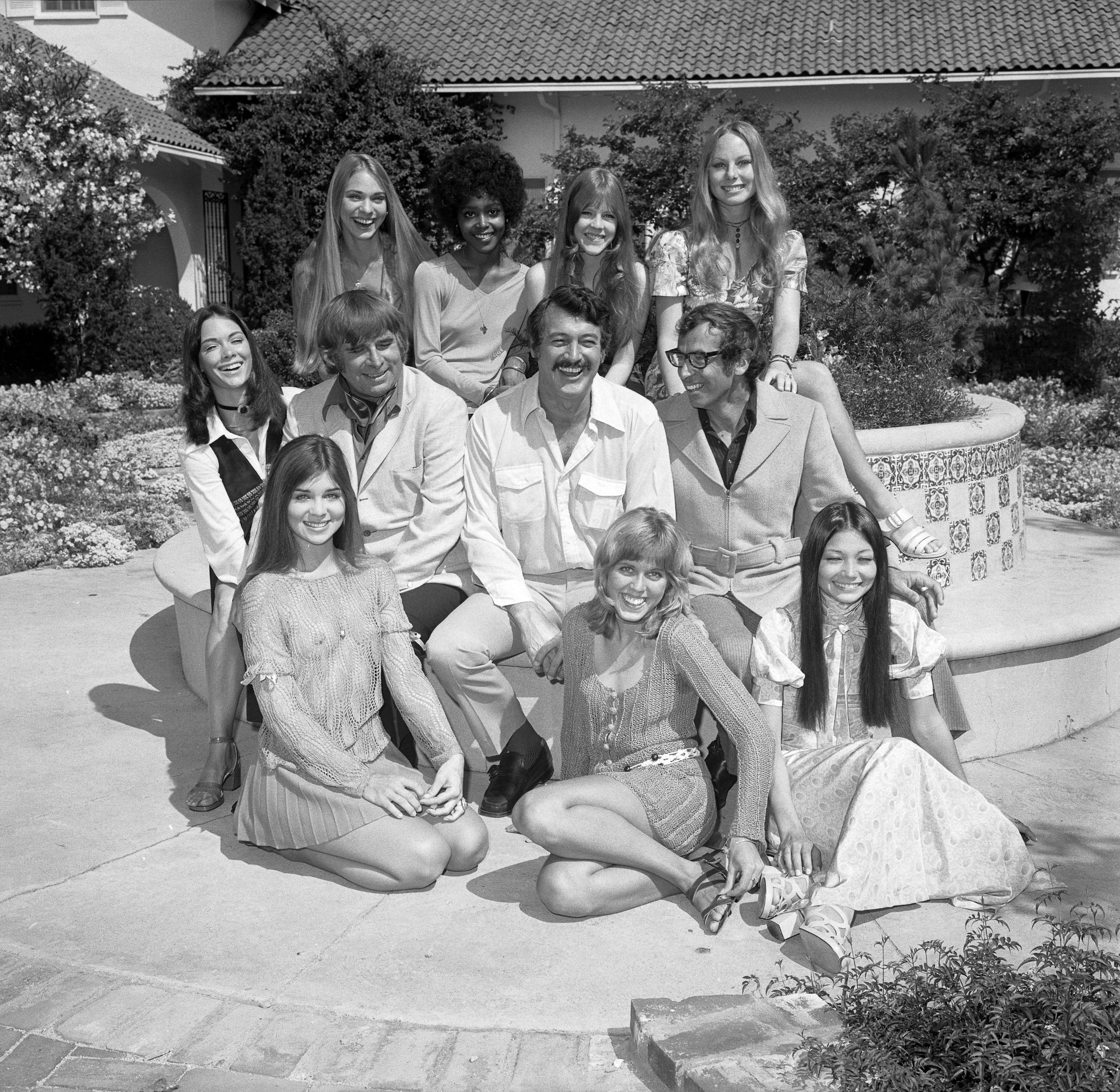
From left to right: June Fairchild, Joy Bang, Aimee Eccles (front row); Joanna Cameron, Gene Roddenberry, Rock Hudson, Roger Vadim (center); Margaret Markov, Brenda Sykes, Diane Sherry, Gretchen Burrell (back row)

- Rock Hudson as Michael "Tiger" McDrew
- Angie Dickinson as Betty Smith
- Telly Savalas as Police Captain Sam Surcher
- John David Carson as Ponce de Leon Harper
- Keenan Wynn as Police Chief John Poldaski
- Barbara Leigh as Jean McDrew, Tiger's wife
- Roddy McDowall as Mr. Proffer, the principal
- James Doohan as Follo
- William Campbell as Grady
- Susan Tolsky as Miss Harriet Craymire

The Pretty Maids

- Brenda Sykes as Pamela Wilcox, an African American student
- Joy Bang as Rita
- Gretchen Burrell as Marjorie
- Joanna Cameron as Yvonne Millick, a dark-haired student
- Aimee Eccles as Hilda Lee, an Asian American student
- June Fairchild as Sonny Swangle, an always-laughing student
- Margaret Markov as Polly
- Diane Sherry as Sheryl

Cast notes

- This film was John David Carson's feature-film debut.
- Dawn Roddenberry, producer Gene Roddenberry's daughter, has a bit part in the film as "Girl #1".

== Production ==
=== Development ===
The novel was published in 1968. Producer Jay Weston and director James B. Harris originally optioned the novel and assigned William Hanley to write the script. Joe Namath was originally envisioned in the role of the football coach. Gene Roddenberry rewrote the script and became the film's producer. Roger Vadim was named director for the film, his first in two years and his first American film. Although Vadim had previously signed contracts with Paramount and Metro-Goldwyn-Mayer (MGM), he ended the contracts because he was not provided creative control. Vadim claimed that he was persuaded to return to MGM:

It seemed this time [MGM was] more interested to give more credit to the director. 'We have changed' they said. But from the moment I get here I fight like hell. They want names but they don't want to pay for them. For the first time I will be at a studio for a major company in Hollywood. In a way I like a challenge. I really think it's necessary to get involved with something new. It's so good to break all your habits. In France I can do anything, here I have to fight. That's a good thing. They respect you if you fight and it keeps you alert.

Vadim also said, "I am not trying to make a statement on America. I tell a story and the story happens to be located in America."

=== Casting ===
Rock Hudson was signed to star in July 1970. Brigitte Bardot was offered the female lead but was busy with a prior commitment, and Angie Dickinson played the role. The cast included eight young female newcomers, the "pretty maids": Brenda Sykes, Joy Bang, Gretchen Burrell, Joanna Cameron, Aimée Eccles, June Fairchild, Margaret Markov and Diane Sherry.

=== Filming ===
The film was in production from August 10 to October 25, 1970. Much of the film was shot at University High School in West Los Angeles. Years later, a University High School administrator told the Los Angeles Times that the high degree of sexual and violent content of the film should have precluded it from being approved for filming at the school. Other scenes were shot at Santa Monica Pier and Venice Marina, while the football sequence was filmed at Rancho La Cienega Park using a local football team and school band.

== Release ==
=== Marketing ===
The April 1971 issue of Playboy magazine published an article about the movie written by Vadim. This article included a nine-page pictorial of actresses Angie Dickinson, Gretchen Burrell, Aimee Eccles, Margaret Markov, Playboy bunny Joyce Williams, and others.

=== Theatrical run ===
Pretty Maids All in a Row had its world premiere in Atlanta, Georgia on March 24, 1971. It premiered in New York City the following month, on April 28, 1971.

=== Home media ===
The Warner Archive Collection released the film on DVD on November 18, 2010. Warner released a Blu-ray edition on June 30, 2026.

== Reception ==
The film was poorly received by most critics, with Roger Ebert calling it "embarrassing" and Ken Hanke of Mountain Xpress remarking: "In 1971 this was pretty daring and trendy. Unfortunately, it's no longer 1971."

On the review aggregator website Rotten Tomatoes, 8% of 12 critics' reviews are positive, with an average rating of 4.4/10.

Quentin Tarantino selected this film as one of his choices for Sight & Sound magazine's 2012 poll of the Greatest Films of All Time.

== See also ==
- List of American films of 1971
