= Joy Bang =

American actress

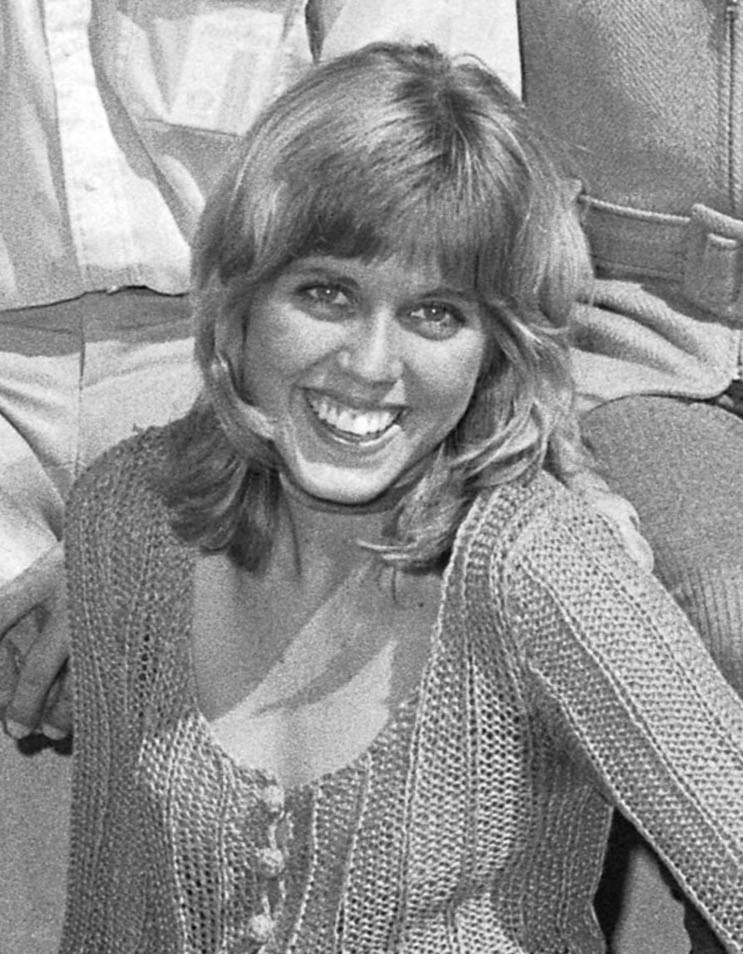
- Bang in 1970
- Born: Kansas City, Missouri, U.S.
- Occupation: Actress
- Years active: 1968–1973
- Spouse: Paul Bang

Joy Bang is an American former actress best known for her film appearances in the early 1970s.

== Early life ==
Bang was born in Kansas City, Missouri, and was adopted when she was one month old. She grew up in New York City, where she attended Hunter Elementary School. She attended Boston University for theatre for one year but dropped out, and later worked as a go-go dancer. She married Paul Bang in the late 1960s.

== Career ==
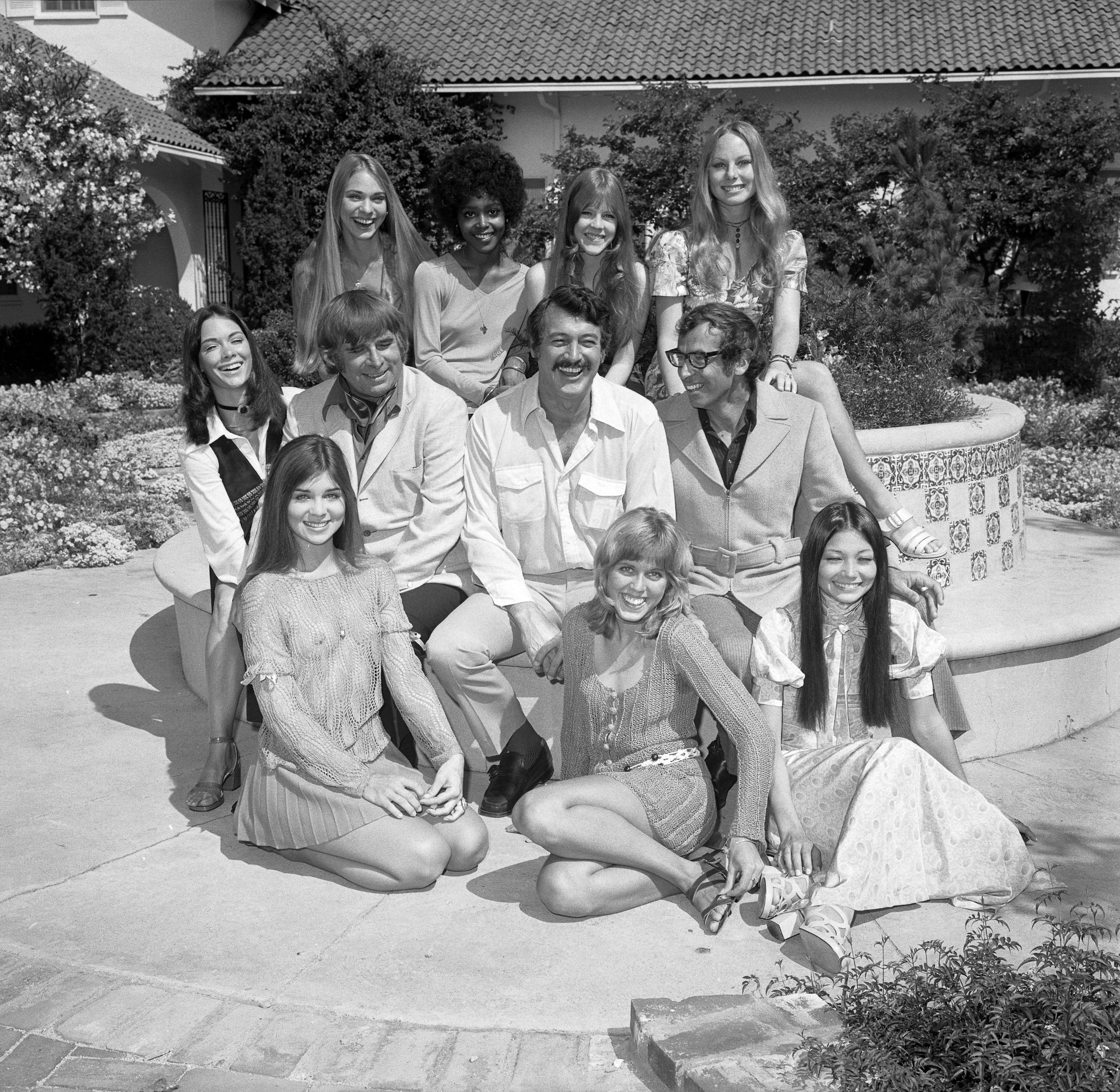
Cast of Pretty Maids All in a Row (L-R): (front row) June Fairchild, Joy Bang, Aimee Eccles; (middle row) Joanna Cameron, Gene Roddenberry, Rock Hudson, Roger Vadim; (back row) Margaret Markov, Brenda Sykes, Diane Sherry, Gretchen Burrell

Bang began her career collaborating with underground filmmaker Andrew Meyer in Boston. She would appear in a total of eight films between 1970 and 1973, most notably Woody Allen's Play It Again, Sam in 1972.

Bang also appears in a 1971 episode of the Christian TV series Insight entitled "The Party" and on the American television series Room 222 in the 16th episode of the third season, entitled "Where Is It Written?".

== Selected filmography ==
List of acting performances in film and television
Year	Title	Role
1970	Events	Joy
1970	Maidstone	Joy Broom
1970	The Kowboys	Smitty
1970	Mission: Impossible, "Flip Side" S5.E2	Girl
1970	Brand X	Joy Bang
1970	The Young Lawyers, "The Two Dollar Thing" S-1 E-3	Chicago
1970	The Psychiatrist, "God Bless the Children" (pilot episode)	Kendell
1971	Pretty Maids All in a Row	Rita
1971	Red Sky at Morning	Corky
1971	Medical Center, "The Impostor" S-3 E-3	Peggy
1971	Insight, "The Party" S1.E339	Abby
1971	Hawaii Five-O, "To Kill or Be Killed" S-3 E-17	Gail Howard
1972	Cisco Pike	Lynn
1972	Night of the Cobra Woman	Joanna
1972	Room 222, "Where Is It Written?" S-3 E-16	Judy Shore
1972	Dealing: Or the Berkeley-to-Boston Forty-Brick Lost-Bag Blues	Sandra
1972	Play It Again, Sam	Julie
1973	Adam-12, “Killing Ground” S-5 E-18 (№ 120)	Susan Danhart
1973	Police Story, "Collision Course" S-1 E-6	Gloria
1973	Messiah of Evil	Toni
