= B.S. I Love You =

1971 film

- Movie poster
- Directed by: Steven Hilliard Stern
- Written by: Steven Hilliard Stern
- Produced by: Arthur M. Broidy
- Starring: Peter Kastner; Joanna Cameron; Louise Sorel; Gary Burghoff; Richard B. Shull; Joanna Barnes
- Cinematography: David Dans
- Edited by: Melvin Shapiro
- Music by: Jimmy Dale; Mark Shekter
- Distributed by: 20th Century Fox
- Release date: March 17, 1971 (Los Angeles)
- Running time: 99 minutes
- Country: United States
- Language: English

B.S. I Love You is a 1971 American comedy-drama film directed and written by Steven Hilliard Stern and starring Peter Kastner. The style of the film is like many others of its era, taking its cues from The Graduate and the raunchiness of the early 1970s, as Kastner plays a youthful TV commercials producer whose quest in life is to bed as many women as possible, while trying to remain faithful to his childhood sweetheart who remains in tow, awaiting the day they will marry.

The film was released to little or no fanfare, and remains today a curious relic from the early 1970s. It is extremely hard to find, as it was never released on VHS and has not been released on DVD as of December 2018. It runs on the Fox Movie Channel from time to time, but it is an edited version (it runs 89 minutes, excising 10 minutes from the original theater release print).

== Plot ==
A female executive, who is the head of an advertising agency on Madison Avenue, has slept her way to the top and now sets her sights on a young advertising executive. He succumbs to her seductions, ensuring his rise up the corporate ladder of success.

== Cast ==
- Peter Kastner as Paul Bongard
- Joanna Cameron as Michele Ink
- Louise Sorel as Ruth
- Gary Burghoff as Ted Bufman
- Joanna Barnes as Jane Ink
- Richard B. Shull as Finley Harris

== Reception ==
Howard Thompson of The New York Times was positive, writing: "With young Mr. Kastner appealingly front and center, the movie skips along jauntily, wisely and amusingly, reined in by a snug cluster of key performances and the pointed, tart dialogue." Gene Siskel of the Chicago Tribune gave the film one star out of four and called it "one of those run-thru-the-park youth films in which a 25-year old male comes to realize that life isn't about ladder climbing in an advertising agency, but love, love, love. It's a better sentiment than a movie." Charles Champlin of the Los Angeles Times called the film "an enjoyment, not a masterpiece, innocently sexy and nicely witty, and with an engaging and talented cast." David McGillivray of The Monthly Film Bulletin wrote: "Any film which shouts this loudly must, one feels, be trying to say something. Yet unless one can count a message which filters through about love being more important than financial gain, nothing very specific emerges from the flamboyant imagery...not even a statement about the ruthlessness of commercial advertising."
