= Gene Roddenberry =

American screenwriter and producer (1921–1991)

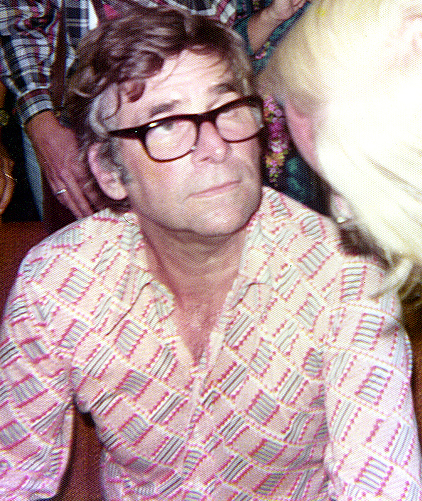
- Roddenberry in 1976
- Born: Eugene Wesley Roddenberry; August 19, 1921; El Paso, Texas, U.S.
- Died: October 24, 1991 (aged 70); Santa Monica, California, U.S.
- Other name: Robert Wesley
- Occupations: Television writer; producer
- Spouses: Eileen-Anita Rexroat (m. 1942; div. 1969) Majel Barrett (m. 1969)
- Partner: Susan Sackett (1975–1991; his death)
- Children: 3, including Rod
- Awards: Air Medal; Distinguished Flying Cross; Hollywood Walk of Fame
- Military career
- Branch: United States Army; Army Air Forces
- Service years: 1941–1945
- Rank: Captain
- Units: 394th Bomb Squadron, 5th Bombardment Group
- Conflicts: World War II

Eugene Wesley Roddenberry Sr. (August 19, 1921 – October 24, 1991) was an American television screenwriter and producer who created the science fiction series and fictional universe Star Trek. Born in El Paso, Texas, Roddenberry grew up in Los Angeles, where his father was a police officer. Roddenberry flew 89 combat missions in the Army Air Forces during World War II and worked as a commercial pilot after the war. Later, he joined the Los Angeles Police Department and began to write for television.

As a freelance writer, Roddenberry wrote scripts for Highway Patrol, Have Gun – Will Travel, and other series, before creating and producing his own television series, The Lieutenant. In 1964, Roddenberry created the original Star Trek series, which premiered in 1966 and ran for three seasons. He then worked on projects including a string of failed television pilots. The syndication of Star Trek led to its growing popularity, resulting in the Star Trek feature films, which Roddenberry continued to produce and consult on. In 1987, the sequel series Star Trek: The Next Generation began airing on television in first-run syndication; Roddenberry was involved in the initial development but took a less active role after the first season due to ill health. He consulted on the series until his death in 1991.

In 1985, Roddenberry became the first TV writer with a star on the Hollywood Walk of Fame. He was later inducted into the Science Fiction Hall of Fame and the Academy of Television Arts & Sciences Hall of Fame. Years after his death, Roddenberry was one of the first humans to have their ashes carried into earth orbit. (Upon reentry, the ashes were lost into the Pacific Ocean.) Star Trek has inspired films, books, comic books, video games and fan films set in the Star Trek universe.

== Early life and career ==
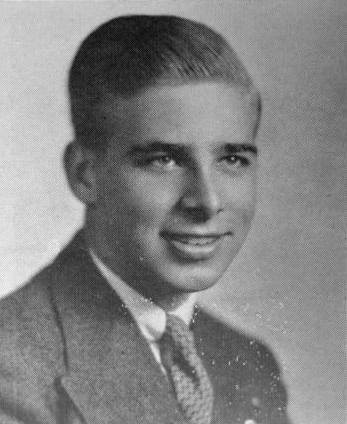
Roddenberry during his senior year of high school at Franklin High School (1939).

Eugene Wesley Roddenberry Sr. was born on August 19, 1921, in his parents' rented home in El Paso, Texas, the first child of Eugene Edward Roddenberry and Caroline "Glen" (née Golemon) Roddenberry. The family moved to Los Angeles in 1923 after Gene's father passed the civil service test and was given a police commission there. During his childhood, Roddenberry was interested in reading, especially pulp magazines, and was a fan of stories such as John Carter of Mars, Tarzan, and the Skylark series by E. E. Smith.

After completing high school in 1939 at Franklin High School in Highland Park, Los Angeles, Roddenberry majored in police science at Los Angeles City College, (Note: Studio biographies have erroneously credited Roddenberry as taking pre-law at Los Angeles City College, before switching to a major in engineering at the UCLA.) where he began dating Eileen-Anita Rexroat and became interested in aeronautical engineering. He obtained a pilot's license through the United States Army Air Corps-sponsored Civilian Pilot Training Program. He enlisted with the USAAC on December 18, 1941 and married Eileen on June 13, 1942. He completed training on August 5, 1942, and was then commissioned as a second lieutenant.

He was posted to Bellows Field, Oahu, to join the 394th Bomb Squadron, 5th Bombardment Group, of the Thirteenth Air Force, which flew the Boeing B-17 Flying Fortress. On November 15, 1942, the unit flew to Viti Levu in Fiji, where they patrolled the seas surrounding the island. A short time later Roddenberry and his unit was assigned to Espiritu Santo. During this time, Roddenberry initially served as a B-17 copilot and then as a first pilot.

On August 2, 1943, Roddenberry was piloting B-17E-BO number 41-2463, nicknamed "Yankee Doodle," when the plane had a malfunction during takeoff. He attempted to abort the takeoff but the B-17 was unable to stop and overran the runway by 500 feet (150 m) and crashed into trees, crushing the nose and starting a fire as well as killing two men: bombardier Sgt. John P. Kruger and navigator Lt. Talbert H. Woolam. The official report absolved Roddenberry of any responsibility. Roddenberry spent the remainder of his military career in the United States and flew all over the country as a plane crash investigator. He was involved in a second plane crash, this time as a passenger. In all, Roddenberry flew 89 combat missions and was awarded the Distinguished Flying Cross and the Air Medal.

In 1945, Roddenberry began flying for Pan American World Airways, including routes from New York to Johannesburg or Calcutta, the two longest Pan Am routes at the time. Listed as a resident of River Edge, New Jersey, he experienced his third crash while on the Clipper Eclipse on June 18, 1947. The plane came down in the Syrian Desert, and Roddenberry, who took control as the ranking flight officer, suffered two broken ribs but was able to drag injured passengers out of the burning plane and led the group to get help. Fourteen (or fifteen) people died in the crash; eleven passengers required hospital treatment (including Bishnu Charan Ghosh), and eight were unharmed. Roddenberry resigned from Pan Am on May 15, 1948, and decided to pursue his dream of writing, particularly for the new medium of television.

Roddenberry applied for a position with the Los Angeles Police Department (LAPD) on January 10, 1949, and spent his first sixteen months in the traffic division before being transferred to the newspaper unit. That became the Public Information Division, and Roddenberry became the speechwriter for the chief of the LAPD. In this position, he also became the LAPD liaison to the very popular Dragnet television series, providing technical advisors for specific episodes. He did his first TV writing for the show, boiling actual cases down to short screen treatments that would be fleshed out into full scripts by Jack Webb's staff of writers; he split the fee with the officers who investigated the real-life case. He became the technical advisor for a new television version of Mr. District Attorney, which led to him writing for the show under his pseudonym "Robert Wesley". He began to collaborate with Ziv Television Programs and continued to sell scripts to Mr. District Attorney, in addition to Ziv's Highway Patrol. In early 1956, he sold two story ideas for I Led Three Lives, and he found that it was becoming increasingly difficult to be a writer and a police officer. On June 7, 1956, he resigned from the LAPD to concentrate on his writing career.

== Career as full-time writer and producer ==
=== Early career ===
Roddenberry was promoted to head writer for The West Point Story and wrote ten scripts for the first season, about a third of the total episodes. While working for Ziv, in 1956, he pitched a series to CBS set aboard a cruise ship, Hawaii Passage, but they did not buy it, as he wanted to become a producer and have full creative control. He wrote another script for Ziv's series Harbourmaster titled "Coastal Security" and signed a contract with the company to develop a show called Junior Executive with Quinn Martin. Nothing came of the series.

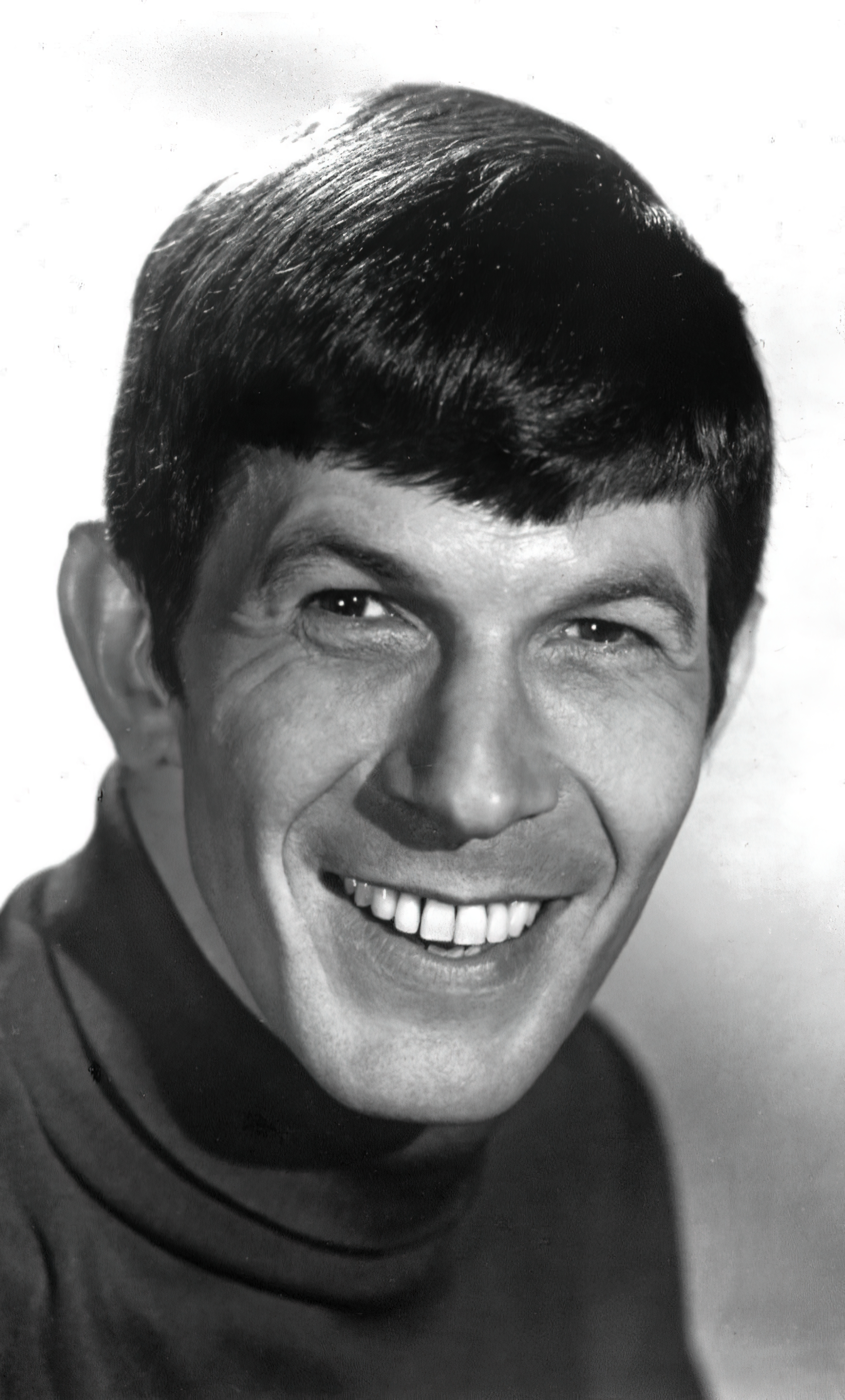
Leonard Nimoy first worked with Roddenberry on The Lieutenant.

He wrote scripts for a number of other series in his early years as a professional writer, including The Jane Wyman Show, Bat Masterson and Jefferson Drum. Roddenberry's episode of the series Have Gun – Will Travel, "Helen of Abajinian", won the Writers Guild of America award for Best Teleplay in 1958. He also continued to create series of his own, including a series based on an agent for Lloyd's of London called The Man from Lloyds. He pitched a police-based series called Footbeat to CBS, Hollis Productions, and Screen Gems. It nearly made it into ABC's Sunday-night lineup, but they opted to show only Western series that night.

Roddenberry was asked to write a series called Riverboat, set in 1860s Mississippi. When he discovered that the producers wanted no Black people on the show, he argued so much with them that he lost the job. He also considered moving to England around this time, as Lew Grade wanted Roddenberry to develop series and set up his own production company. Though he did not move, he leveraged the deal to land a contract with Screen Gems that included a guaranteed $100,000, and became a producer for the first time on a summer replacement for The Tennessee Ernie Ford Show titled Wrangler.

Screen Gems backed Roddenberry's first attempt at creating a pilot. His series, The Wild Blue, went to pilot, but was not picked up. The three main characters had names that later appeared in the Star Trek series: Philip Pike, Edward Jellicoe, and James T. Irvine. While working at Screen Gems, an actress, new to Hollywood, wrote to him asking for a meeting. They quickly became friends and met every few months; the woman was Majel Leigh Hudec, later known as Majel Barrett. He created a second pilot called 333 Montgomery about a lawyer, played by DeForest Kelley. It was not picked up by the network but was later rewritten as a new series called Defiance County. His career with Screen Gems ended in late 1961, and shortly afterward, he had issues with his old friend Erle Stanley Gardner. The Perry Mason creator claimed that Defiance County had infringed his character Doug Selby. The two writers fell out via correspondence and stopped contacting one another, though Defiance County never proceeded past the pilot stage. The project finally wound up as the NBC series Sam Benedict with Edmond O'Brien in the title role, produced by MGM. E. Jack Neuman took the creator's credit, claiming the character was based on real-life San Francisco lawyer Jake Ehrlich.

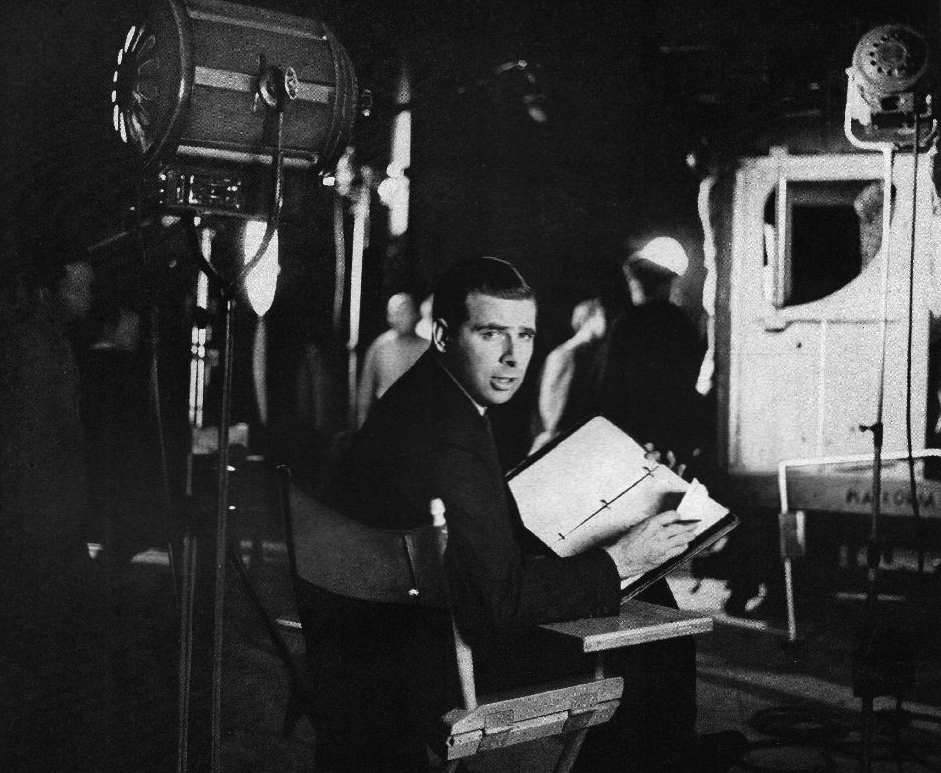
Roddenberry appearing in an advertisement for MONY in 1961

In 1961, he agreed to appear in an advertisement for MONY (Mutual of New York) as long as he had final approval. With the money from Screen Gems and other works, he and Eileen moved to 539 South Beverly Glen, near Beverly Hills. He discussed an idea about a multi-ethnic crew on an airship traveling the world, based on the film Master of the World (1961), with fellow writer Christopher Knopf at MGM. As the time was not right for science fiction, he began work on The Lieutenant for Arena Productions. This made it to the NBC Saturday night lineup at 7:30 pm and premiered on September 14, 1963. The show set a new ratings record for the time slot. Roddenberry worked with several cast and crew who would later join him on Star Trek, including Gene L. Coon, star Gary Lockwood, Joe D'Agosta, Leonard Nimoy, Nichelle Nichols, and Majel Barrett.

The Lieutenant was produced with the co-operation of the Pentagon, which allowed them to film at an actual Marine base. During the production of the series Roddenberry clashed regularly with the Department of Defense over potential plots. The department withdrew its support after Roddenberry pressed ahead with a plot titled "To Set It Right" in which a white and a black man find a common cause in their roles as Marines. "To Set It Right" was the first time he worked with Nichols, and it was her first television role. The episode has been preserved at the Museum of Television and Radio in New York City. The show was not renewed after its first season. Roddenberry was already working on a new series idea. This included his ship location from Hawaii Passage and added a Horatio Hornblower character, plus the multiracial crew from his airship idea. He decided to write it as science fiction, and by March 11, 1964, he brought together a 16-page pitch. On April 24, he sent three copies and two dollars to the Writers Guild of America to register his series. He called it Star Trek.

=== Star Trek ===
When Roddenberry pitched Star Trek to MGM, it was warmly received, but no offer was made. He then went to Desilu Productions, but rather than being offered a one-script deal, he was hired as a producer and allowed to work on his own projects. His first was a half-hour pilot called Police Story (not to be confused with the anthology series created by Joseph Wambaugh), which was not picked up by the networks. Having not sold a pilot in five years, Desilu was having financial difficulties; its only success was The Lucy Show. Roddenberry took the Star Trek idea to Oscar Katz, head of programming, and the duo immediately started work on a plan to sell the series to the networks. They took it to CBS, which ultimately passed on it. The duo later learned that CBS had been eager to find out about Star Trek because it had a science fiction series in development—Lost in Space. Roddenberry and Katz next took the idea to Mort Werner at NBC, this time downplaying the science fiction elements and highlighting the links to Gunsmoke and Wagon Train. The network funded three story ideas and selected "The Menagerie", which was later known as "The Cage", to be made into a pilot. (The other two later became episodes of the series.) While most of the money for the pilot came from NBC, the remaining costs were covered by Desilu. Roddenberry hired Dorothy Fontana, better known as D. C. Fontana, as his assistant. They had worked together previously on The Lieutenant, and she had eight script credits to her name.

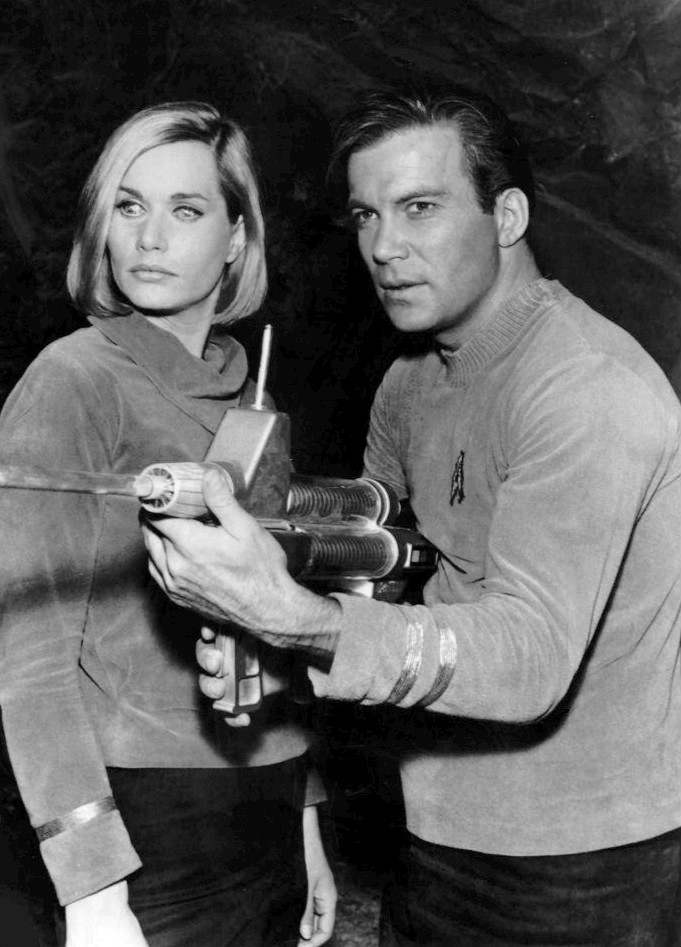
William Shatner and Sally Kellerman, from "Where No Man Has Gone Before", the second pilot of Star Trek

Roddenberry and Barrett had begun an affair by the early days of Star Trek, and he specifically wrote the part of the character Number One in the pilot with her in mind; no other actresses were considered for the role. Barrett suggested Nimoy for the part of Spock. He had worked with both Roddenberry and Barrett on The Lieutenant, and once Roddenberry remembered the thin features of the actor, he did not consider anyone else for the part. The remaining cast came together; filming began on November 27, 1964, and was completed on December 11. After post-production, the episode was shown to NBC executives, and it was rumored that Star Trek would be broadcast at 8:00 pm on Friday nights. The episode failed to impress test audiences, and after the executives became hesitant, Katz offered to make a second pilot. On March 26, 1965, NBC ordered a new episode.

Roddenberry developed several possible scripts, including "Mudd's Women", "The Omega Glory", and with the help of Samuel A. Peeples, "Where No Man Has Gone Before". NBC selected the last one, leading to later rumors that Peeples created Star Trek, something he always denied. Roddenberry was determined to make the crew racially diverse, which impressed actor George Takei when he came for his audition. The episode went into production on July 15, 1965, and was completed at around half the cost of "The Cage", since the sets were already built. Roddenberry worked on several projects for the rest of the year. In December, he decided to write lyrics to the Star Trek theme; this angered the theme's composer, Alexander Courage, as it meant that royalties would be split between them. In February 1966, NBC informed Desilu that they were buying Star Trek and that it would be included in the fall 1966 television schedule.

On May 24, the first episode of the Star Trek series went into production; Desilu was contracted to deliver 13 episodes. Five days before the first broadcast, Roddenberry appeared at the 24th World Science Fiction Convention and previewed "Where No Man Has Gone Before". After the episode was shown, he received a standing ovation. The first episode to air on NBC was "The Man Trap", on September 8, 1966, at 8:00 pm. Roddenberry was immediately concerned about the series' low ratings and wrote to Harlan Ellison to ask if he could use his name in letters to the network to save the show. Not wanting to lose a potential source of income, Ellison agreed and also sought the help of other writers who also wanted to avoid losing potential income. Roddenberry corresponded with science fiction writer Isaac Asimov about how to address the issue of Spock's growing popularity and the possibility that his character would overshadow Kirk. Asimov suggested having Kirk and Spock work together as a team "to get people to think of Kirk when they think of Spock." The series was renewed by NBC, first for a full season's order, and then for a second season. An article in the Chicago Tribune quoted studio executives as stating that the letter-writing campaign had been wasted because they had already been planning to renew Star Trek.

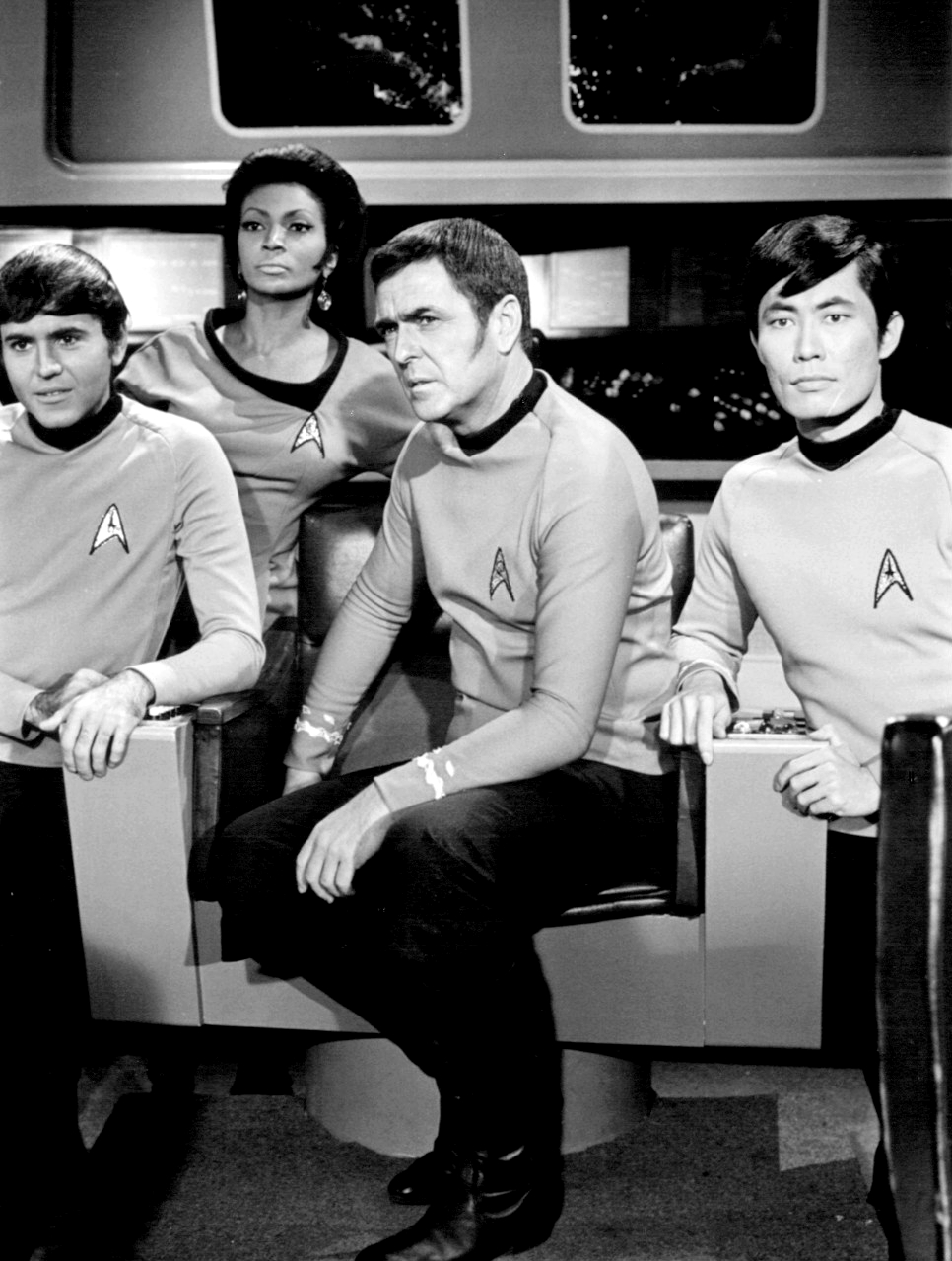
Some of the main cast of Star Trek during the third season

Roddenberry often rewrote submitted scripts, although he did not always take credit for these. Roddenberry and Ellison fell out over "The City on the Edge of Forever" after Roddenberry rewrote Ellison's script to make it both financially feasible to film and usable for the series context. Even his close friend Don Ingalls had his script for "A Private Little War" altered drastically, and as a result, Ingalls declared that he would only be credited under the pseudonym "Jud Crucis" (a play on "Jesus Christ"), claiming he had been crucified by the process. Roddenberry's work rewriting "The Menagerie", based on footage originally shot for "The Cage", resulted in a Writers Guild arbitration board hearing. The Guild ruled in his favor over John D. F. Black, the complainant. The script won a Hugo Award, but the awards board neglected to inform Roddenberry, who found out through correspondence with Asimov.

As the second season was drawing to a close, Roddenberry once again faced the threat of cancellation. He enlisted the help of Asimov, and even encouraged a student-led protest march on NBC. On January 8, 1968, a thousand students from 20 schools marched on the studio. Roddenberry began to communicate with Star Trek fan Bjo Trimble, who led a fan-writing campaign to save the series. Trimble later noted that this campaign of writing to fans who had written to Desilu about the show, urging them to write NBC, had created an organized Star Trek fandom. The network received around 6,000 letters a week from fans petitioning it to renew the series. On March 1, 1968, NBC announced on air, at the end of "The Omega Glory", that Star Trek would return for a third season.

The network had initially planned to place Star Trek in the 7:30 pm Monday-night time slot freed up by The Man from U.N.C.L.E. completing its run. That would have meant Rowan & Martin's Laugh-In had to start a half-hour later (moving from 9:00 to 9:30). Powerful Laugh-In producer George Schlatter objected to his highly rated show yielding its slot to the poorly-rated Star Trek. Instead, Laugh-In retained the slot, and Star Trek was moved to 10:00 pm on Fridays. Realizing the show could not survive in that time slot and burned out from arguments with the network, Roddenberry resigned from the day-to-day running of Star Trek, although he continued to be credited as executive producer. Roddenberry cooperated with Stephen Edward Poe, writing as Stephen Whitfield, on the 1968 non-fiction book The Making of Star Trek for Ballantine Books, splitting the royalties evenly. Roddenberry explained to Whitfield: "I had to get some money somewhere. I'm sure not going to get it from the profits of Star Trek." Herbert Solow and Robert H. Justman observed that Whitfield never regretted his 50–50 deal with Roddenberry, since it gave him "the opportunity to become the first chronicler of television's successful unsuccessful series." Whitfield had previously been the national advertising and promotion director for model makers Aluminum Model Toys, better known as "AMT", which then held the Star Trek license, and moved to run Lincoln Enterprises, Roddenberry's company set up to sell the series' merchandise.

Having stepped aside from the majority of his Star Trek duties, Roddenberry sought instead to create a film based on Asimov's "I, Robot" and also began work on a Tarzan script for National General Pictures. After initially requesting a budget of $2 million and being refused, Roddenberry made cuts to reduce costs to $1.2 million. When he learned they were being offered only $700,000 to shoot the film, which by now was being called a TV movie, he canceled the deal. NBC announced Star Trek's cancellation in February 1969. A similar but much smaller letter-writing campaign followed news of the cancellation. Because of the manner in which the series was sold to NBC, it left the production company $4.7 million in debt. The last episode of Star Trek aired 47 days before Neil Armstrong stepped onto the moon as part of the Apollo 11 mission, and Roddenberry declared that he would never write for television again.

=== 1970s projects ===
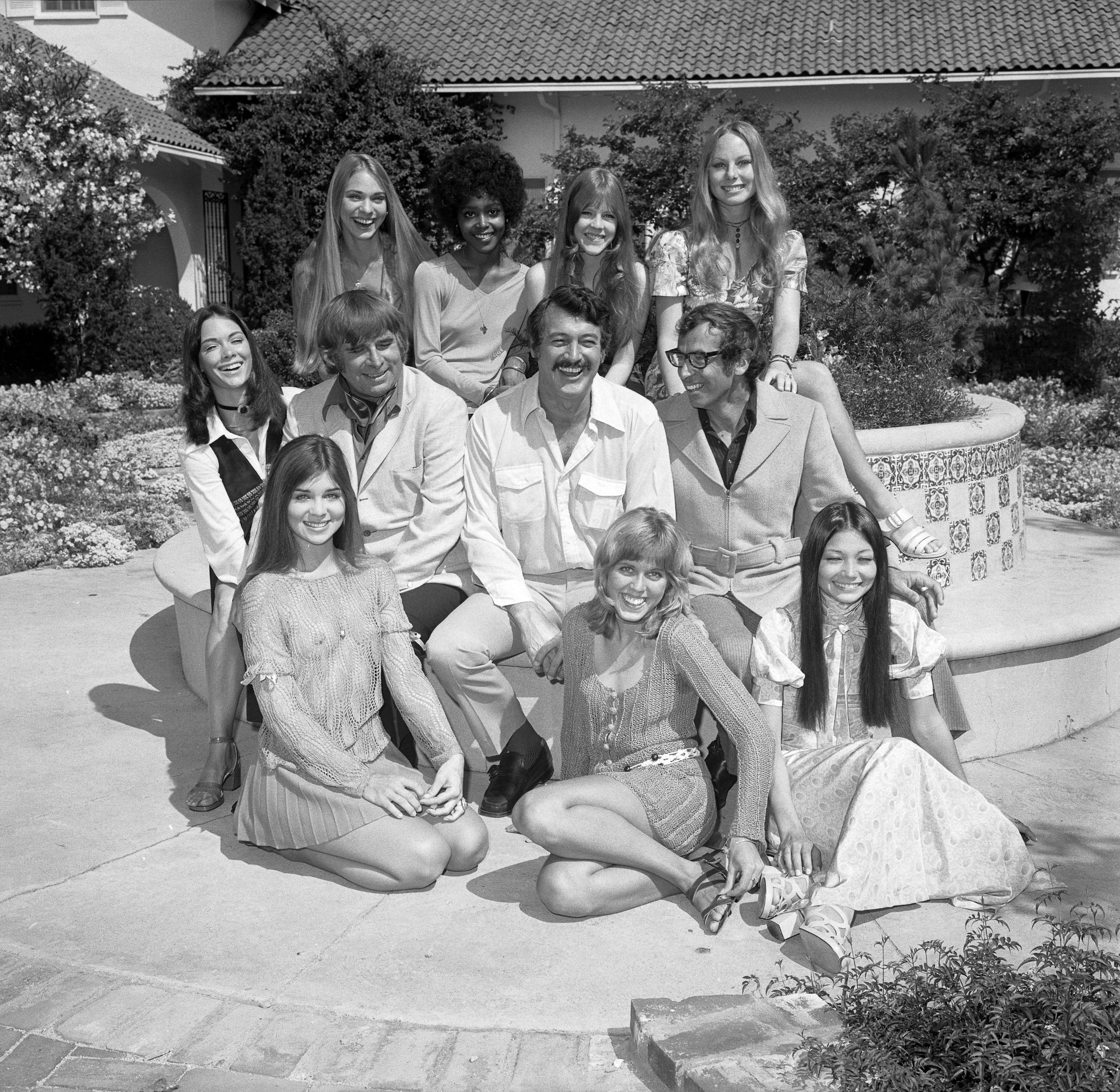
Cast of Pretty Maids All in a Row (L-R): (front row) June Fairchild, Joy Bang, Aimee Eccles; (middle row) Joanna Cameron, Gene Roddenberry, Rock Hudson, Roger Vadim; (back row) Margaret Markov, Brenda Sykes, Diane Sherry, Gretchen Burrell

After the cancellation of Star Trek, Roddenberry felt typecast as a producer of science fiction, despite his background in Westerns and police stories. He later described the period, saying, "My dreams were going downhill because I could not get work after the original series was cancelled." He felt that he was "perceived as the guy who made the show that was an expensive flop." Roddenberry had sold his interest in Star Trek to Paramount Studios in return for a third of the profits but this did not result in any quick financial gain; the studio was still claiming that the series was $500,000 in the red in 1982.

He wrote and produced Pretty Maids All in a Row (1971), a sexploitation film directed by Roger Vadim, for MGM. The cast included Rock Hudson, Angie Dickinson, Telly Savalas, and Roddy McDowall alongside Star Trek regular James Doohan and notable guest star William Campbell, who had appeared in "The Squire Of Gothos" and "The Trouble with Tribbles". Variety was unimpressed: "Whatever substance was in the original [novel by Francis Pollini] or screen concept has been plowed under, leaving only superficial, one-joke results." Herbert Solow had given Roddenberry the work as a favor, paying him $100,000 for the script.

Faced with a mortgage and a $2,000-per-month alimony obligation as a result of his 1969 divorce, he retained a booking agent (with the assistance of his friend Arthur C. Clarke) and began to support himself largely by scheduling appearances at colleges and science fiction conventions. These presentations typically included screenings of "The Cage" and blooper reels from the production of Star Trek. The conventions began to build the fan support to bring back Star Trek, leading TV Guide to describe it, in 1972, as "the show that won't die."

In 1972 and 1973, Roddenberry made a comeback to science fiction, selling ideas for four new series to a variety of networks. Roddenberry's Genesis II was set in a post-apocalyptic Earth. He had hoped to recreate the success of Star Trek without "doing another space-hopping show." He created a 45-page writing guide, and proposed several story ideas based on the concept that pockets of civilisation had regressed to past eras or changed altogether. The pilot aired as a TV movie in March 1973, setting new records for the Thursday Night Movie of the Week. Roddenberry was asked to produce four more scripts for episodes, but before production could begin again, CBS aired the film Planet of the Apes. It was watched by an even greater audience than Genesis II. CBS scrapped Genesis II and replaced it with a television series based on the film; the results were disastrous from a ratings standpoint, and Planet of the Apes was canceled after 14 episodes.

The Questor Tapes project reunited him with his Star Trek collaborator, Gene L. Coon, who was in poor health. NBC ordered 16 episodes, and tentatively scheduled the series to follow The Rockford Files on Friday nights; the pilot launched on January 23, 1974, to positive critical response, but Roddenberry balked at the substantial changes requested by the network and left the project, leading to its immediate cancellation. During 1974, Roddenberry reworked the Genesis II concept as a second pilot, Planet Earth, for rival network ABC, with similar less-than-successful results. The pilot was aired on April 23, 1974. While Roddenberry wanted to create something that could feasibly exist in the future, the network wanted stereotypical science-fiction women and were unhappy when that was not delivered. Roddenberry was not involved in a third reworking of the material by ABC that produced Strange New World. He began developing MAGNA I, an underwater science-fiction series, for 20th Century Fox Television. By the time the work on the script was complete, though, those who had approved the project had left Fox and their replacements were not interested in the project. A similar fate was faced by Tribunes, a science-fiction police series, which Roddenberry attempted to get off the ground between 1973 and 1977. He gave up after four years; the series never even reached the pilot stage.

In 1974, Roddenberry was paid $25,000 by John Whitmore to write a script called The Nine. Intended to be about Andrija Puharich's parapsychological research, it evolved into a frank exploration of his experiences attempting to earn a living attending science fiction conventions. At the time, he was again close to losing his house because of a lack of income. The pilot Spectre, Roddenberry's 1977 attempt to create an occult detective duo similar to Sherlock Holmes and Dr. Watson, was released as a television movie within the United States and received a limited theatrical release in the United Kingdom.

=== Star Trek revival ===
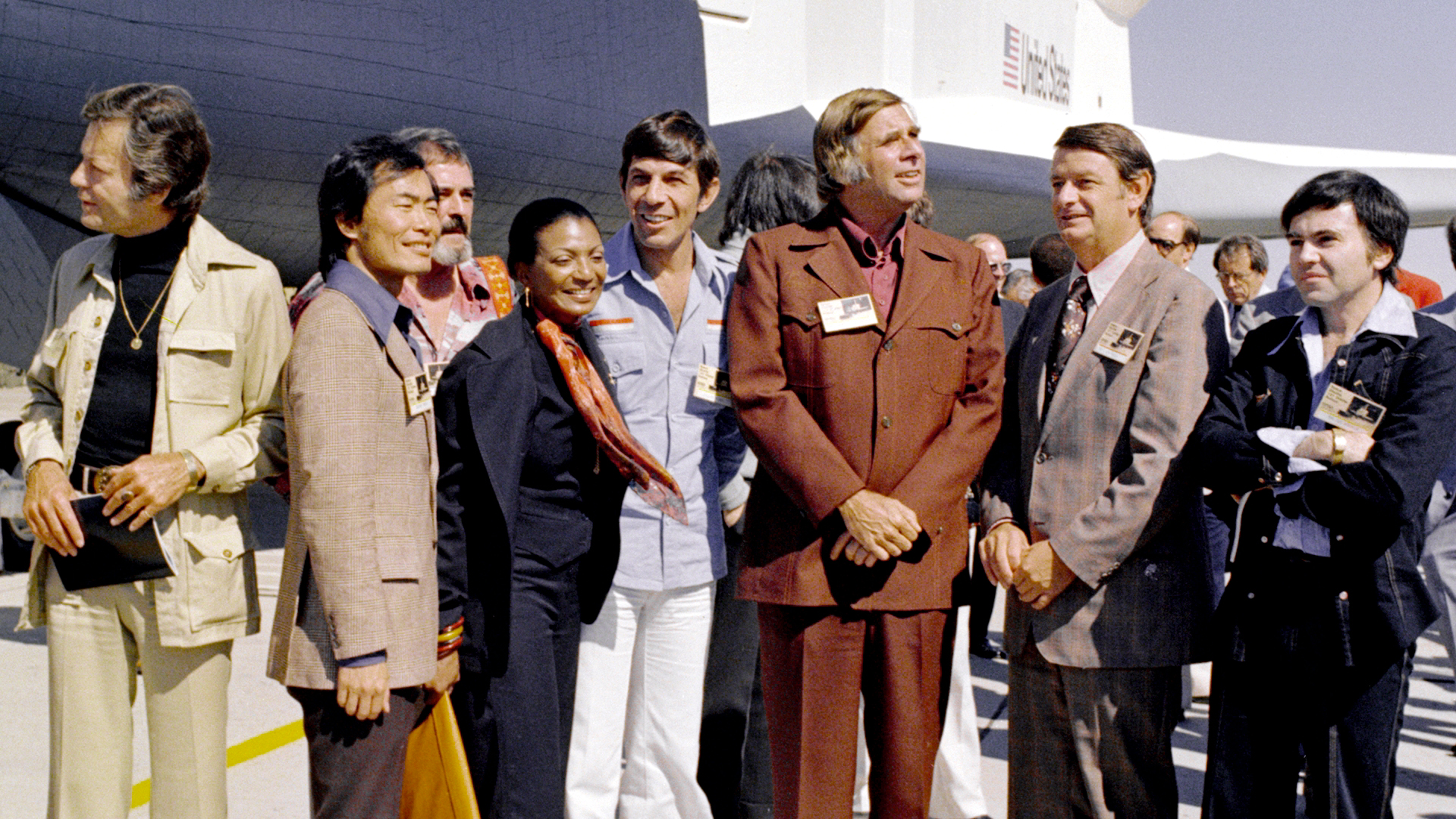
Roddenberry (third from the right) in 1976 with most of the cast of Star Trek at the rollout of the Space Shuttle Enterprise at the Rockwell International plant in Palmdale, California

Lacking funds in the early 1970s, Roddenberry was unable to buy the full rights to Star Trek for $150,000 ($1.24 million in 2025) from Paramount. Lou Scheimer approached Paramount in 1973 about creating an animated Star Trek series. Credited as "executive consultant" and paid $2,500 per episode, Roddenberry was granted full creative control of Star Trek: The Animated Series. Although he read all the scripts and "sometimes [added] touches of his own", he relinquished most of his authority to de facto showrunner/associate producer D. C. Fontana.

Roddenberry had some difficulties with the cast. To save money, he sought not to hire George Takei and Nichelle Nichols. He neglected to inform Leonard Nimoy of this and instead, to get him to sign on, told him that he was the only member of the main cast not returning. After Nimoy discovered the deception, he demanded that Takei and Nichols play Sulu and Uhura when their characters appeared on screen; Roddenberry acquiesced. He had been promised five full seasons of the new show but ultimately, only one and a half were produced.

Vociferous fan support (6,000 attended the second New York Star Trek convention in 1973 and 15,000 attended in 1974, eclipsing the more established array of approximately 3,600 fans and industry professionals who attended the 32nd World Science Fiction Convention in Washington, D.C. in 1974) led Paramount to hire Roddenberry to create and produce a feature film based on the franchise in May 1975. The studio was unimpressed with the ideas being put forward; John D. F. Black's opinion was that their ideas were never "big enough" for the studio, even when one scenario involved the end of the universe. Several ideas were partly developed including Star Trek: The God Thing and Star Trek: Planet of the Titans. Following the commercial reception of Star Wars, in June 1977, Paramount instead green-lit a new series set in the franchise titled Star Trek: Phase II, with Roddenberry and most of the original cast, except Nimoy, set to reprise their respective roles.

It was to be the anchor show of a proposed Paramount-owned "fourth network", but plans for the network were scrapped and the project was reworked into a feature film. The result, Star Trek: The Motion Picture, troubled the studio because of budgetary concerns, but it was a box-office hit. Adjusted for inflation, it was the third-highest-grossing Star Trek movie, with the 2009 film coming in first and the 2013 film second.

In 1980, Roddenberry submitted a treatment for a proposed sequel about the crew preventing the alien Klingons from thwarting the assassination of John F. Kennedy. Mindful of the tumult that suffused the production of Star Trek: The Motion Picture, Paramount rejected the proposal. After he was replaced on the project by television producer Harve Bennett, Roddenberry was named "executive consultant" for the project, a position he retained for subsequent Star Trek franchise films produced during his lifetime. Under this arrangement, he was compensated with a producer's fee and a percentage of the net profits of the film in exchange for proffering non-binding story notes and corresponding with the fan community; much to his chagrin, these memos were largely disregarded by Bennett and other producers. An initial script for Star Trek II: The Wrath of Khan was circulated to eight people; Bennett attributed the subsequent plot leak of the death of Spock to Roddenberry. About 20% of the plot was based on Roddenberry's ideas.

Roddenberry was involved in creating the television series Star Trek: The Next Generation, which premiered with "Encounter at Farpoint" on September 28, 1987. He was given a bonus of $1 million (equivalent to $3.3 million in 2025) in addition to a salary to produce the series, and celebrated by purchasing a new Rolls-Royce for $100,000. The arrangement did not entitle him to be executive producer of the series. Paramount was already concerned about the original cast not returning, and fearing fan reaction if Roddenberry was not involved, agreed to his demand for control of the show. Roddenberry rewrote the series bible from an original version by David Gerrold, who had previously written The Original Series episode "The Trouble with Tribbles", and The Animated Series follow-up, "More Tribbles, More Troubles".

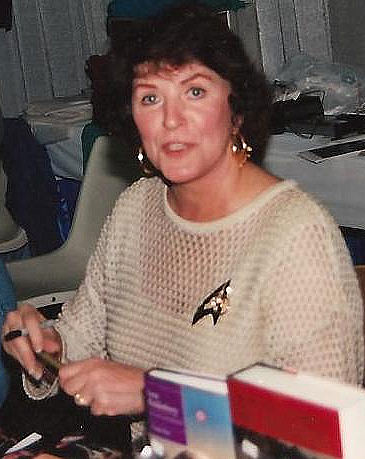
Majel Barrett at a Star Trek convention in 2007

According to producer Rick Berman, Roddenberry's involvement in The Next Generation "diminished greatly" after the first season, but the nature of his increasingly peripheral role was not disclosed because of the value of his name to fans. While Berman said that Roddenberry had "all but stopped writing and rewriting" by the end of the third season, his final writing credit on the show (a co-teleplay credit) actually occurred considerably earlier, appearing on "Datalore", the 13th episode of the first season.

Although commercially successful from its inception, the series was initially marred by Writers Guild of America grievances from Fontana and Gerrold, both of whom left the series in acrimonious circumstances; frequent turnover among the writing staff (24 staff writers left the show during its first three seasons, triple the average attrition rate for such series); and allegations that Roddenberry attorney Leonard Maizlish had become the producer's "point man and proxy", ghostwriting memos, sitting in on meetings, and contributing to scripts despite not being on staff. Writer Tracy Tormé described the first few seasons of The Next Generation under Roddenberry as an "insane asylum".

In 1990, Nicholas Meyer was brought in to direct the sixth film in the series: Star Trek VI: The Undiscovered Country. Creatively, Meyer clashed with Roddenberry, who felt that having the Enterprise crew hold prejudices against the Klingons did not fit with his view of the universe. Meyer described a meeting with Roddenberry he later regretted, saying

His guys were lined up on one side of the room, and my guys were lined up on the other side of the room, and this was not a meeting in which I felt I'd behaved very well, very diplomatically. I came out of it feeling not very good, and I've not felt good about it ever since. He was not well, and maybe there were more tactful ways of dealing with it, because at the end of the day, I was going to go out and make the movie. I didn't have to take him on. Not my finest hour.

In Joel Engel's biography, Gene Roddenberry: The Myth and the Man Behind Star Trek, he states that Roddenberry watched The Undiscovered Country alongside the producers of the film at a private screening two days before his death, and told them they had done a "good job". In contrast, Nimoy and Shatner's memoirs report that after the screening, Roddenberry called his lawyer and demanded a quarter of the scenes be cut; the producers refused.

Roddenberry wrote the novelization of Star Trek: The Motion Picture. Although it has been incorrectly attributed to several other authors (most notably Alan Dean Foster), it was the first in a series of hundreds of Star Trek-based novels to be published by the Pocket Books imprint of Simon & Schuster, whose parent company also owned Paramount Pictures Corporation. Previously, Roddenberry worked intermittently on The God Thing, a proposed novel based upon his rejected 1975 screenplay for a proposed low-budget ($3 to $5 million) Star Trek film preceding the development of Phase II throughout 1976. Attempts to complete the project by Walter Koenig, Susan Sackett, Fred Bronson, and Michael Jan Friedman have proven to be unfeasible for a variety of legal and structural reasons.

== Personal life ==
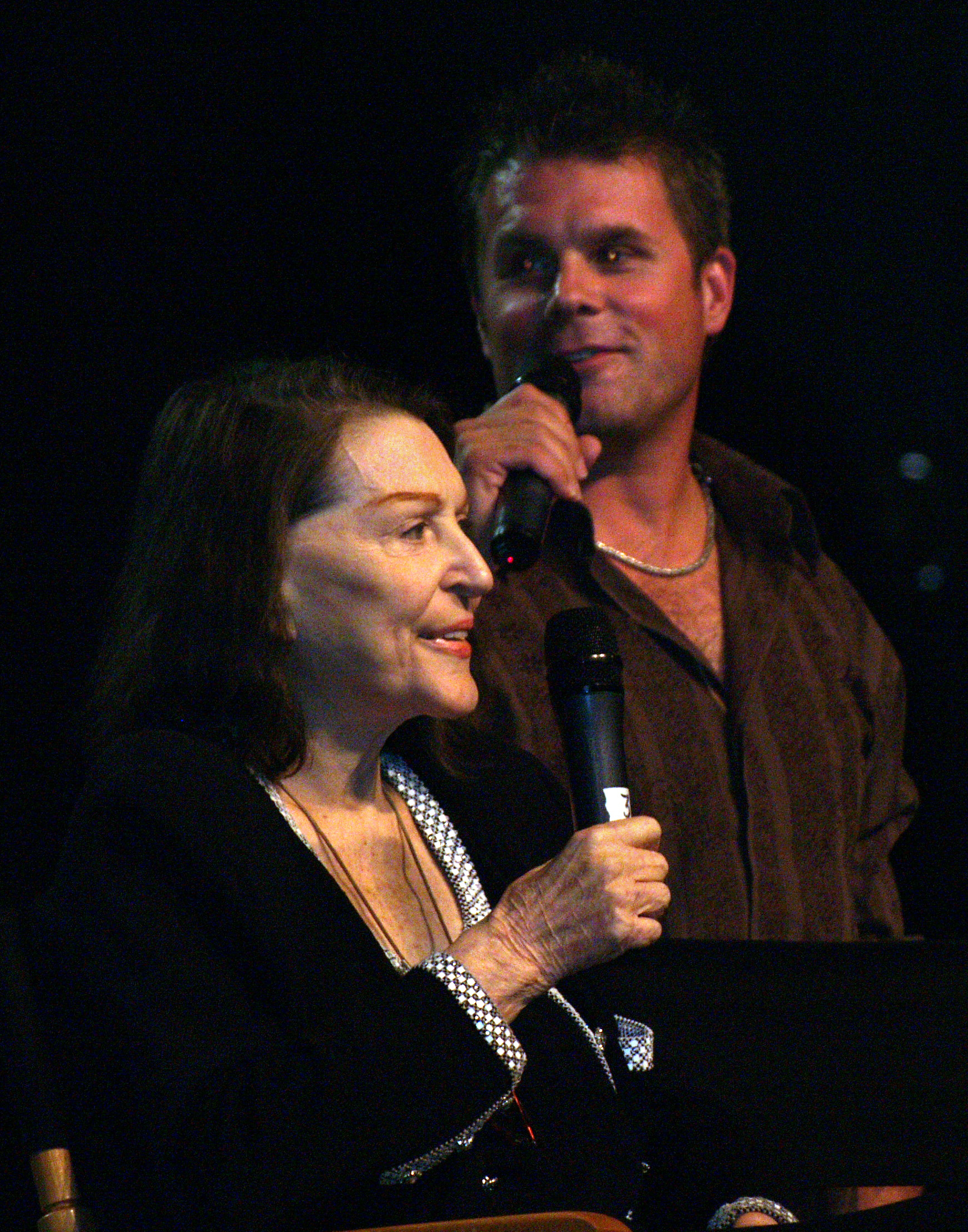
Majel Barrett-Roddenberry and Rod Roddenberry in Las Vegas, August 2008

While at Los Angeles City College, Roddenberry began dating Eileen-Anita Rexroat. They became engaged before Roddenberry left Los Angeles during his military service, and they married on June 20, 1942, at the chapel at Kelly Field. They had two daughters. During his time in the LAPD, Roddenberry was known to have had affairs with secretarial staff. Before his work on Star Trek, he began relationships with Nichelle Nichols and Majel Barrett. Nichols wrote about their relationship in her autobiography Beyond Uhura only after Roddenberry's death. At the time, Roddenberry wanted to remain in an open relationship with both women, but Nichols, recognizing Barrett's devotion to him, ended the affair as she did not want to be "the other woman to the other woman".

Barrett and Roddenberry had an apartment together by the opening weeks of Star Trek. He had planned to divorce Eileen after the first season of the show, but when the show was renewed, he delayed doing so, fearing that he would not have enough time to deal with both the divorce and Star Trek. He moved out of the family home on August 9, 1968, two weeks after the marriage of his daughter. In 1969, while scouting locations in Japan for MGM for Pretty Maids All in a Row, he proposed to Barrett by telephone. They were married in a Shinto ceremony, as Roddenberry had considered it "sacrilegious" to have an American minister in Japan perform the ceremony. Roddenberry and Barrett had a son together, Eugene Jr., commonly and professionally known as Rod Roddenberry, in February 1974.

From 1975 until his death, Roddenberry maintained an extramarital relationship with his executive assistant, Susan Sackett.

=== Religious views ===
Roddenberry grew up a Southern Baptist; however, as an adult, he rejected religion, and considered himself a humanist. He began questioning religion around the age of 14, and came to the conclusion that it was "nonsense". As a child, he served in the choir at his local church, but often substituted lyrics as he sang hymns. Early in his writing career, he received an award from the American Baptist Convention for "skillfully writing Christian truth and the application of Christian principles into commercial, dramatic TV scripts". For several years, he corresponded with John M. Gunn of the National Council of Churches regarding the application of Christian teachings in television series. However, Gunn stopped replying after Roddenberry wrote in a letter: "But you must understand that I am a complete pagan, and consume enormous amounts of bread, having found the Word more spice than nourishment, so I am interested in a statement couched in dollars and cents of what this means to the Roddenberry treasury."

Roddenberry said of Christianity, "How can I take seriously a God-image that requires that I prostrate myself every seven days and praise it? That sounds to me like a very insecure personality." At one point, he worked a similar opinion, which was to have been stated by a Vulcan, into the plot for Star Trek: The God Thing. He had a similar disdain for Judaism. Despite working closely with Jewish writers and stars such as Shatner, Nimoy, and Koenig for the series, Nimoy said of Roddenberry, "Gene was antisemitic, clearly," qualifying that Roddenberry was anti-religious, seeing Jews as a religious group, adding "but I saw examples not only of [Roddenberry] practicing antisemitism, but of him being callous about other peoples' differences as well.” As with Christianity, Roddenberry similarly dismissed that there were any deliberately Jewish principles or allusions included in Star Trek, telling a journalist, "You Jews have a lamentable habit of identifying those characteristics in a society that you deem positive and then taking credit for inventing them.”

Before his death, Roddenberry became close friends with philosopher Charles Musès, who said that Roddenberry's views were "a far cry from atheism". Roddenberry explained his position thus: "It's not true that I don't believe in God. I believe in a kind of God. It's just not other people's God. I reject religion. I accept the notion of God." He had an ongoing interest in other people's experiences with religion, and called Catholicism "a very beautiful religion. An art form." However, he said that he dismissed all organized religions, saying that for the most part, they acted like a "substitute brain... and a very malfunctioning one". Roddenberry was also critical of how the public looked at certain religions, noting that when the King David Hotel bombing took place in 1946, the American public accepted it as the action of freedom fighters, whereas a car bombing by a Muslim in Beirut is condemned as a terrorist act. While he agreed that both parties were wrong in their use of violence, he said that the actions of both were undertaken because of their strong religious beliefs.

According to Ronald D. Moore, Roddenberry "felt very strongly that contemporary Earth religions would be gone by the 23rd century". Brannon Braga said that Roddenberry made it known to the writers of Star Trek and Star Trek: The Next Generation that religion, superstition, and mystical thinking were not to be included. Even a mention of marriage in a script for an early episode of The Next Generation resulted in Roddenberry's chastising the writers. Nicholas Meyer said that Star Trek had evolved "into sort of a secular parallel to the Catholic Mass". Roddenberry compared the franchise to his own philosophy by saying: "Understand that Star Trek is more than just my political philosophy, my racial philosophy, my overview on life and the human condition." He was awarded the 1991 Humanist Arts Award from the American Humanist Association.

== Decline in health and death ==
In the late 1980s, it was likely that Roddenberry was afflicted by the first manifestations of cerebrovascular disease and encephalopathy as a result of his longstanding recreational use of legal and illicit drugs, including alcohol, methaqualone, methylphenidate, Dexamyl, and cocaine (which he had used regularly since the production of Star Trek: The Motion Picture). Roddenberry also used cannabis for many years, although its cumulative impact on his health remains unclear. Throughout much of his career, he had routinely used stimulants to work through the night on scripts, especially amphetamines. The effects of these substances were compounded by deleterious interactions with diabetes, high blood pressure, and antidepressant prescriptions.

Roddenberry had a stroke at a family reunion in Tallahassee, Florida, in September 1989. His health declined further, ultimately requiring him to use a wheelchair. His right arm was paralyzed after another stroke in early October 1991, causing him ongoing pain as the muscles began to atrophy. It also caused problems with the sight in his right eye, and he found communicating in full sentences difficult. At 2:00 pm, on October 24, he attended an appointment with his doctor, Dr. Ronald Rich, in Santa Monica, California. He arrived in the building with his staff and began to travel up to the ninth floor in the elevator. As they reached the fifth floor, he began struggling to breathe and was wheeled into the doctor's office, where he was reclined, and a nurse administered oxygen. Barrett was sent for. Upon her arrival, she held Roddenberry while encouraging him to breathe. He suffered cardiopulmonary arrest in the doctor's office shortly afterwards. CPR was attempted with no effect, and paramedics arrived to take him across the road to the Santa Monica Medical Center, where he was pronounced dead. He was 70 years old.

The funeral was arranged for November 1, with the public invited to the memorial service at the Hall of Liberty, within the Forest Lawn Memorial Park, in Hollywood Hills. It was a secular service; Roddenberry had been cremated before the event. More than 300 Star Trek fans attended and stood in the balcony section of the hall, while the invited guests were on the floor level. Nichelle Nichols sang twice during the ceremony, first "Yesterday", and then a song she wrote herself titled "Gene". Both songs had been requested by Barrett. Several people spoke at the memorial, including Ray Bradbury, Whoopi Goldberg, E. Jack Neuman, and Patrick Stewart. The ceremony was closed by two kilted pipers playing "Amazing Grace" as a recorded message by Roddenberry was broadcast. A four-plane flypast, in the missing man formation, followed some 30 minutes later. After his death, Star Trek: The Next Generation aired a two-part episode of season five, called "Unification", which featured a dedication to Roddenberry.

Roddenberry's will left the majority of his $30 million estate to Barrett in a trust. He also left money to his children and his first wife, Eileen. However, his daughter Dawn contested the will on the grounds that Barrett had had undue influence on her father. In a hearing held in 1993, the Los Angeles Superior Court ruled that improprieties existed in the management of the trust and removed Barrett as executor. In another decision, the court found that Roddenberry had hidden assets from Star Trek in the Norway Corporation to keep funds away from his first wife, and ordered the payment of 50% of those assets to Eileen, as well as punitive damages. In 1996, the California Court of Appeals ruled that the original will, which stated that anyone who contested it would be disinherited, would stand. As a result, Dawn lost $500,000 from the estate, as well as a share of the trust upon Barrett's death. The appellate court also overturned the earlier decision to award Roddenberry's first wife, Eileen, 50% of his assets. The judge called that decision one "that should never have been".

=== Spaceflight ===
In 1992, some of Roddenberry's ashes were flown into space, and returned to Earth, on the Space Shuttle Columbia mission STS-52. On April 21, 1997, a Celestis spacecraft with 7 grams (1/4 oz) of the cremated remains of Roddenberry, along with those of Timothy Leary, Gerard K. O'Neill and 21 other people, was launched into Earth orbit as part of the Minisat 01 mission aboard a Pegasus XL rocket from a location near the Canary Islands.

On May 20, 2002, the spacecraft's orbit deteriorated and it disintegrated in the atmosphere. Another flight to launch more of his ashes into deep space, along with those of Barrett, who died in 2008, was initially planned to take place in 2009. Unlike previous flights, the intention was that the flight would not return, burning up in the Earth's atmosphere. The payload would include the ashes of James Doohan in addition to the Roddenberrys' and several others and was scheduled to fly in 2016 on the Sunjammer solar sail experiment, but the project was canceled in 2014. Celestis rescheduled their launch for 2020, then later rescheduled for June 2022, the next available commercial mission to deep space. A sample of the couple's cremated remains was sealed into a specially made capsule designed to withstand space travel. The flight also contained the ashes of Nichelle Nichols and Douglas Trumbull. The Celestis "Enterprise Flight" was successfully launched from Cape Canaveral, Florida on January 8, 2024, very fittingly on a rocket named Vulcan.

== Legacy ==
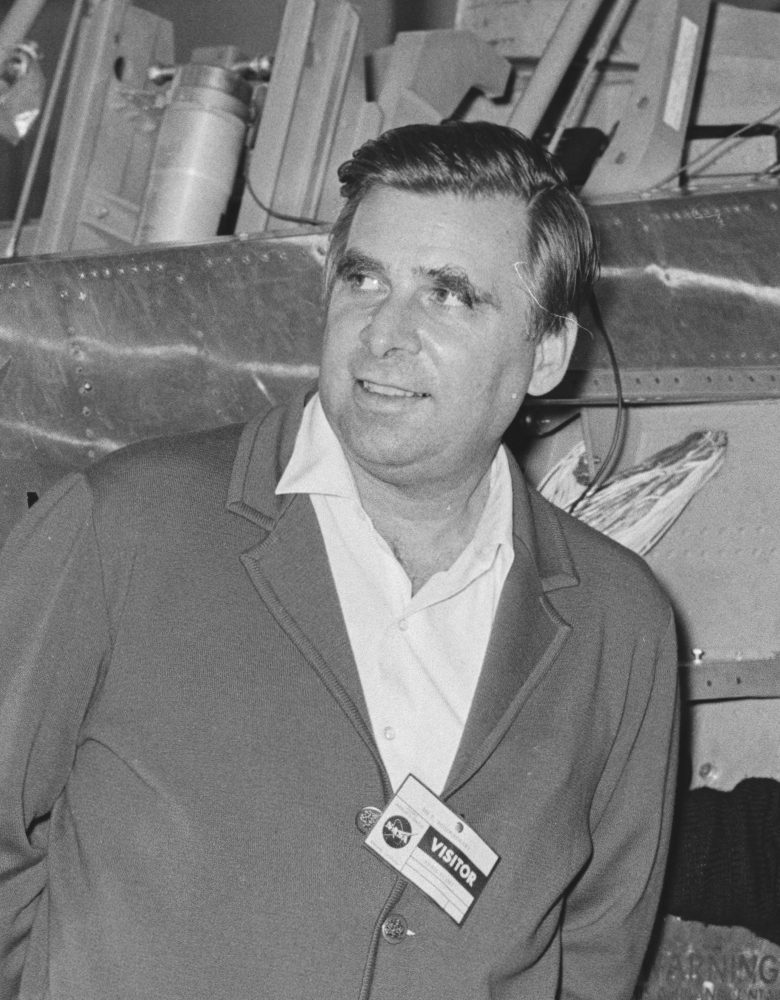
Roddenberry at the NASA Dryden Flight Research Center (now Armstrong Flight Research Center), 1967

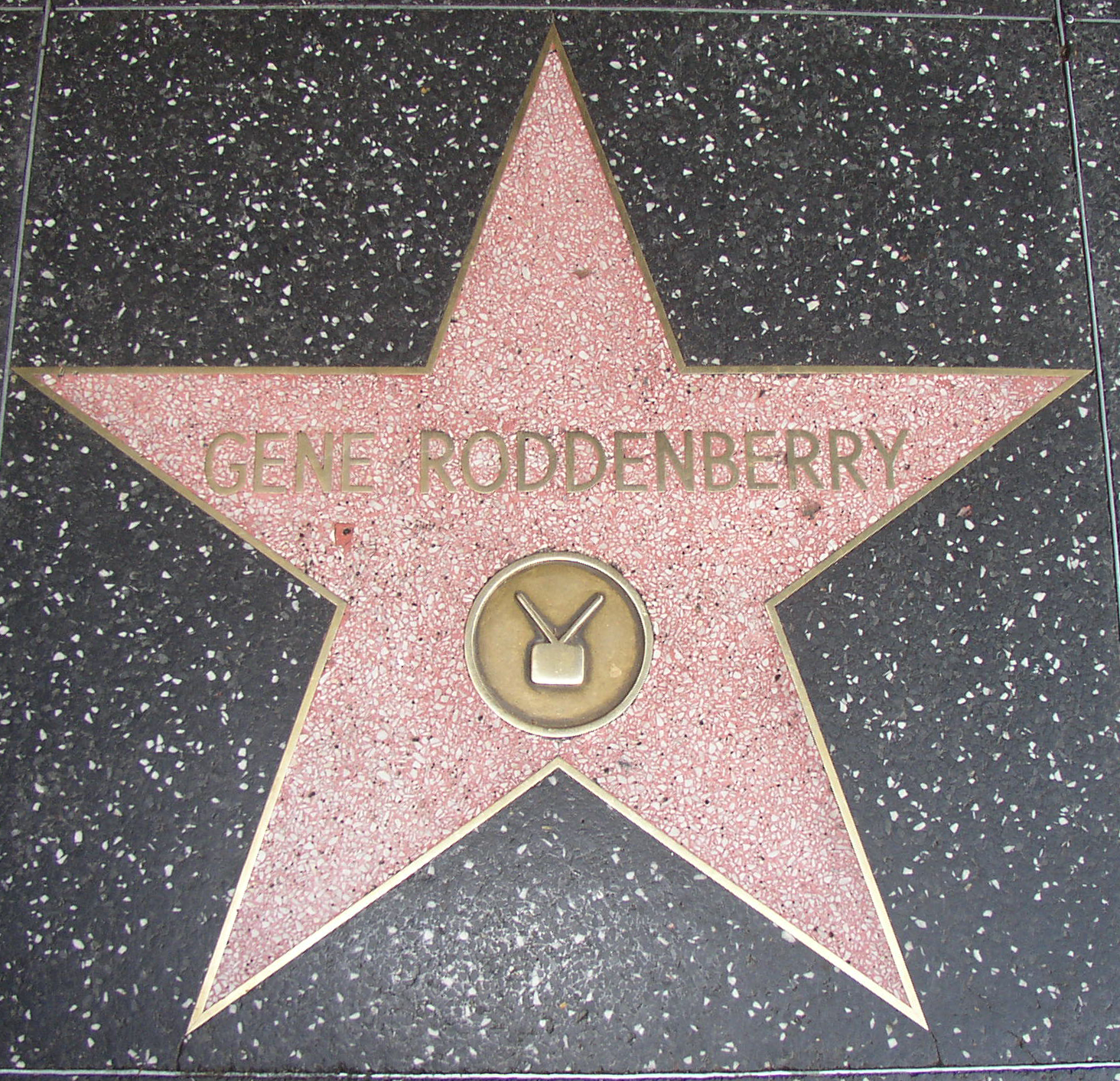
Roddenberry's star on the Hollywood Walk of Fame

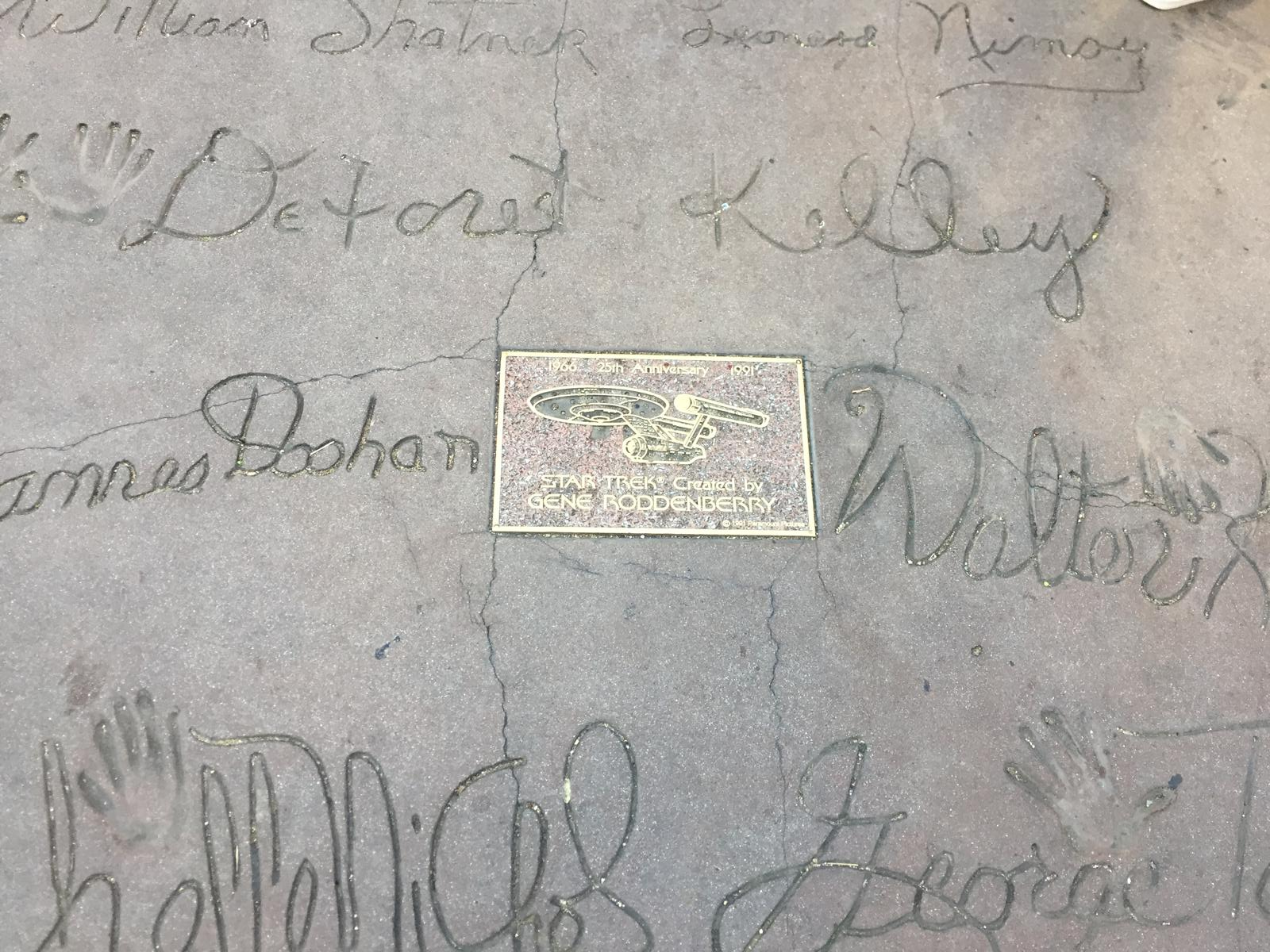
Gene Roddenbery-Star Trek 25th anniversary plaque in Hollywood Boulevard, Los Angeles

In 1985, Gene Roddenberry was the first television writer to receive a star on the Hollywood Walk of Fame. When the Sci-Fi Channel was launched, the first broadcast was a dedication to two "science fiction pioneers": Isaac Asimov and Roddenberry. The Roddenberry crater on Mars is named after him, as is the asteroid 4659 Roddenberry. Roddenberry and Star Trek have been cited as inspiration for other science fiction franchises, with George Lucas crediting the series for enabling Star Wars to be produced. J. Michael Straczynski, creator of the Babylon 5 franchise, appreciated Star Trek amongst other science fiction series and "what they had to say about who we are, and where we are going."

David Alexander collaborated with Roddenberry on a biography over two decades. Titled Star Trek Creator, it was published in 1995. Yvonne Fern's book Gene Roddenberry: The Last Conversation detailed a series of conversations she had with Roddenberry over the last months of his life. In October 2002, a plaque was placed at Roddenberry's birthplace in El Paso, Texas. The El Paso Independent School District named the 40-foot, 120-seat Roddenberry Planetarium in his honor. The planetarium was recently upgraded and relocated to northeast El Paso. The Science Fiction Hall of Fame inducted Roddenberry in 2007, and the Television Academy Hall of Fame in January 2010.

Commemorating Roddenberry's 100th birthday in August 2021, NASA used its Deep Space Network to transmit a 1976 recording of Roddenberry towards the direction of the star system 40 Eridani (the host of the fictional planet Vulcan). The signal will reach the star in early 2038.

In September 2023, a genus of spiders, Roddenberryus, was named after him. The two researchers stated that he "inspired generations of kids to pursue scientific careers".

=== Posthumous television series ===
Star Trek: Deep Space Nine was already in development when Roddenberry died. Berman said that while he never discussed the ideas for the series, he was given a blessing by Roddenberry to pursue it. Berman later said, "I don't believe the 24th century is going to be like Gene Roddenberry believed it to be, that people will be free from poverty and greed. But if you're going to write and produce for Star Trek, you've got to buy into that." In early 1996, Majel Barret-Roddenberry uncovered scripts for a series called Battleground Earth. The project was sent to distributors by the Creative Artists Agency, and it was picked up by Tribune Entertainment, which set the budget at over $1 million per episode. The series was renamed Earth: Final Conflict before launch, and premiered in 1997, six years after Gene's death; it ran for five seasons and 110 episodes until 2002.

Two further series ideas were developed from Roddenberry's notes, Genesis II and Andromeda. After an initial order for two seasons, 110 episodes of Andromeda were aired over five seasons from 2000 to 2005. Tribune also worked on another Roddenberry series. Titled Starship; the production company aimed to launch it via the network route rather than into syndication. Rod Roddenberry, president of Roddenberry Productions, announced in 2010, at his father's posthumous induction into the Academy of Television Arts and Sciences Hall of Fame, that he was aiming to take The Questor Tapes to television. Rod was developing the series alongside Imagine Television. Rod would go on to create the two-hour television movie Trek Nation regarding the impact of his father's work.

=== Awards and nominations ===
The majority of the awards and nominations received by Roddenberry throughout his career were related to Star Trek. He was credited for Star Trek during the nominations for two Emmy Awards, and won two Hugo Awards. One Hugo was a special award for the series, while another was for "The Menagerie", the episode that used footage from the original unaired pilot for Star Trek, "The Cage". In addition, he was awarded the Brotherhood Award by the National Association for the Advancement of Colored People for his work in the advancement of African American characters on television. Star Trek, ended in 1969; he was nominated for Hugo Awards for Genesis II and The Questor Tapes. in 1974 and 1975, respectively. After his death in 1991, he was posthumously awarded the Robert A. Heinlein Memorial Award by the National Space Society and The George Pal Memorial Award at the Saturn Awards, as well as the Exceptional Public Service Medal by NASA.

== See also ==
- Herbert Franklin Solow
