= Lincoln Enterprises =

Mail-order company

- Formerly: Star Trek Enterprises
- Genre: Television merchandise
- Founded: 1967
- Founder: Bjo Trimble, Gene Roddenberry
- Successor: Roddenberry.com
- Owner: Majel Barrett

Lincoln Enterprises, formerly Star Trek Enterprises, was a mail-order company set up by Bjo Trimble and Gene Roddenberry to sell merchandise related to the American science fiction television series Star Trek. It was known for selling official scripts and film cells directly from Desilu Productions during the run of the series. It later expanded into general Star Trek merchandise under Majel Barrett, and has since been subsumed into Roddenberry.com.

== History ==
Following the second season of the original Star Trek series, fan Bjo Trimble led efforts in 1967 to ensure that the show was renewed for a third season. Part of this effort was the creation of Star Trek Enterprises, in conjunction between Trimble and the show's creator, Gene Roddenberry. Through the help of Roddenberry, the company sold mail order Star Trek merchandise, which was obtained directly from the studio. Another claim to the foundation of the company was after a letter from science fiction writer Isaac Asimov to Roddenberry was mislaid among fan mail, and he received a photograph of the cast in response.

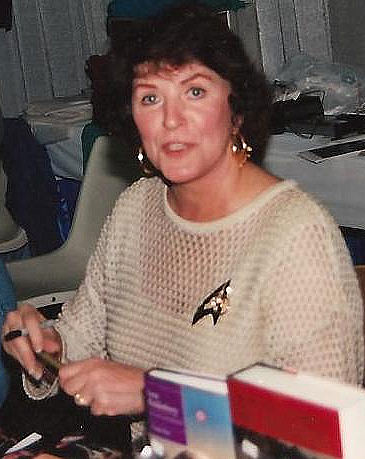
Majel Barrett took over control of Lincoln Enterprises from Bjo Trimble

At the time, Roddenberry's marriage to his first wife, Eileen, was rapidly collapsing; the couple would soon divorce. In preparation for this eventuality, Roddenberry created Lincoln and put it in the name of Majel Barrett, who had been his mistress since she had played Number One in the show's original pilot episode, and later the recurring character of Nurse Christine Chapel, as well as providing the voice for the ship's computer. If the company was in her name, its assets and profits would not be community property under California law and thus beyond Eileen's reach in a divorce.

The company advertised copies of the Star Trek pitch and show bible, and a catalog with "items never before available from a TV show! Exciting photos, actual scripts, film clips, fun bumper stickers, and MORE!". The scripts were additional copies from the print runs at the studio, after more were ordered each time than necessary with the additional scripts sold on by the company. Star Trek Enterprises specialized in film frames, which were either bought as clips or as single mounted frames, which Trimble realized were popular at a science fiction convention she attended. These were sourced from the editing rooms at Desilu; however, this caused a problem during the third season as film editor Don Rode required a shot of the USS Enterprise traveling at warp speed. He had remembered this being shown during the first season and sought to re-use it. He visited the vaults at Desilu, where the old footage was meant to be stored but upon entering, found it to be empty. When he asked a security guard, he was told that Roddenberry and Barrett had cleared it out the day before, claiming the studio was going to destroy it. Desilu was alerted, but no action was taken. The strips were then processed and sold on by the company.

Nine months after the company was founded, Roddenberry fired Bjo Trimble and her husband John, who had by then built most of the mailing lists from the names and addresses they had collected from all across the country to save the show from cancellation and produced most of its sales materials. While John Trimble says it was merely a disagreement over the company's direction, Roddenberry biographer Joel Engel believes Roddenberry always intended to replace them. Their replacement, Stephen Whitfield, a marketing executive with AMT, a Michigan company that had made considerable profit from selling Star Trek-themed models, was corresponding with Roddenberry regularly about the future direction of the company before the Trimbles were fired, while working in an office across the hall where he was ostensibly researching The Making of Star Trek, a book cocredited to Roddenberry although Whitfield was the sole writer. Whitfield was paid more than the Trimbles had been; he was also still on AMT's payroll at that time.

Roddenberry's letters to Whitfield indicate a plan to suggest to Paramount Pictures, which had bought Desilu, that it could make more money from Star Trek by hiring Star Trek Enterprises to replace the company that had handled the show's fan mail for a lower cost, and eventually no fee whatsoever. They would tell Paramount that the revenue from the "fan kits" sent out in response to fan letters was declining, although Roddenberry knew that interest in the show remained high. He believed Paramount's executives would "grab for pennies and forget the dollars", preferring a short-term savings to long-term profits.

After the change in management, the company was renamed to Lincoln Enterprises. This name was attributed to Roddenberry's love of Abraham Lincoln. Barrett would later claim that the company was far older than it was, saying it was first known as Lincoln Publishing and owned by someone else. It then transferred into the hands of Leonard Maizlish, Roddenberry's personal lawyer. She said that it was handed from Maizlish to her in the early 1980s. The method of cutting the film strips changed under Barrett, as she thought it made it more authentic to have the cuts be less precise. This led to fan complaints, because cuts were taken part way through frames above and below the intended frame. Other products included an "official" newsletter, Inside Star Trek, a flight deck certificate and a copy of the original pitch document for the series.

The product range was increased in the early 1990s from props and technical documents to more general merchandise. Tribble toys were purchased for use in the production of the Star Trek: Deep Space Nine episode "Trials and Tribble-ations" from the company in 1996. The company eventually became roddenberry.com. In 2010, the remaining film clip collection of the company was sold at auction by Julien's Auctions at the Planet Hollywood Resort & Casino in Las Vegas.
