= The Great American Beauty Contest =

1973 American television film

- Genre: Drama
- Written by: Stanford Whitmore
- Directed by: Robert Day
- Starring: JoAnna Cameron; Eleanor Parker; Robert Cummings; Louis Jourdan; Farrah Fawcett
- Music by: Kenneth Wannberg
- Country of origin: United States
- Original language: English

Production
- Executive producers: Leonard Goldberg; Aaron Spelling
- Producer: Everett Chambers
- Production locations: Los Angeles County; Ambassador Hotel - 3400 Wilshire Boulevard, Los Angeles, California
- Cinematography: James A. Crabe
- Editors: James D. Mitchell; Bruce Schoengarth; Frank Capacchione
- Running time: 74 minutes
- Production companies: ABC Circle Films; Spelling-Goldberg Productions
- Budget: $410,000

Original release
- Network: ABC
- Release: February 13, 1973

The Great American Beauty Contest is a 1973 American satirical comedy–drama television film, starring JoAnna Cameron, Eleanor Parker, Robert Cummings, Louis Jourdan and featuring Farrah Fawcett in an early film appearance.

It was directed by Robert Day and was originally shown on the anthology film series ABC Movie of the Week in the United States on February 13, 1973.

== Plot ==
Feminist Gloria Rockwell enters a beauty contest, hoping to win and deliver a speech on exploitation and sexism at the end.

Meanwhile, pageant runners Peggy Lowery (well-known actress and former Miss American Beauty queen) and Dan Carson have their own troubles. Peggy is displeased when lecherous movie producer Ralph Dupree attends as a last-minute replacement judge, and host Dan worries the contest will be rigged.

Each contestant has their own challenges: talented Miss Maine feels neglected by her father, naive Miss Ohio gets her first taste of the world beyond home, cynical Miss New Jersey feels marginalized as the lone African-American contestant, friendly Miss Utah is considered an also-ran, and vivacious Miss Texas's relationship with her boyfriend is tested when the contest forces them apart.

The pageant world is satirizes as the contestants rehearse with their chaperones and in preliminary stages. Ralph attempts to blackmail Peggy into arranging a liaison with Angelique to win the pageant, which is how Peggy got her first break.

Gloria, Pamela, Melinda, Angelique, and T L are the finalists. Ultimately, Gloria wins the pageant, but surprising her feminist friends and herself, tearfully accepts the crown.

== Cast ==
- Eleanor Parker as Peggy Lowery
- Robert Cummings as Dan Carson
- Louis Jourdan as Ralph Dupree
- JoAnna Cameron as Gloria Rockwell, Miss Oklahoma
- Susan Damante as Angelique Denby, Miss Maine
- Farrah Fawcett as T L Dawson, Miss Texas
- Kathrine Baumann as Melinda Wilson, Miss Ohio
- Tracy Reed as Pamela Parker, Miss New Jersey
- Christopher Norris as Janice Brock, Miss Utah
- Larry Wilcox as Joe Bunch, TL's boyfriend
- Patricia Barry as Kay Earnshaw, Gloria's chaperone
- Brett Somers as Miss Texas's chaperone
- Susan Anton as last Great American Beauty winner
- Barbi Benton as Miss Iowa
- Ryan McDonald as Elliot, reporter
- Mady Maguire as Lib Girl

== Production ==
The film was announced in December 1972.

"It's turning out to be great camp", said Aaron Spelling during filming.

== Reception ==
The Los Angeles Times called it "witty, perceptive."

The New York Times wrote "Even with some biting dialogue that often rings true, this drama... is essentially a sour‐tasting mess of pottage. "

== See also ==
- List of American films of 1973
- Smile (1975 film)
- Drop Dead Gorgeous (film)
