= It Couldn't Happen to a Nicer Guy =

- Genre: Comedy
- Written by: Earl Barret; Arne Sultan
- Directed by: Cy Howard
- Starring: Paul Sorvino; Michael Learned; JoAnna Cameron; Bob Dishy
- Theme music composer: Fred Karlin
- Country of origin: United States
- Original language: English

Production
- Executive producer: Gerald I. Isenberg
- Producer: Arne Sultan
- Production locations: Mulholland Drive, Hollywood Hills, Los Angeles, California
- Cinematography: Matthew F. Leonetti
- Editors: Christopher Holmes; Carroll Sax
- Running time: 74 minutes
- Production company: The Jozak Company

Original release
- Network: ABC
- Release: November 19, 1974

It Couldn't Happen to a Nicer Guy is a 1974 American made-for-television black comedy film starring Paul Sorvino and JoAnna Cameron. The film was co-written and produced by Arne Sultan as an ABC Movie of the Week installment. The film was one of Sorvino's first leading roles.

In the film, a salesman is kidnapped and raped by a beautiful woman. He is left naked in a small town, and he has to explain what happened to him.

== Plot ==
Harry Walters is a stout real estate salesman who is randomly picked up by a beautiful woman, Wanda Olivia Wellman. He is subsequently raped at gunpoint as a prank. He is later dropped off naked in a small town and left to explain to his wife, friends, and the police how he was both kidnapped and raped by a woman.

== Cast ==
- Paul Sorvino as Harry Walters
- Michael Learned as Janet Walters
- Bob Dishy as Ed Huxley
- Adam Arkin as Ken Walters
- Eddie Barth as Sgt. Riggs
- Roger Bowen as Stu Dotney
- Carl Franklin as Hovey
- Diane Cary as Diane Civita
- JoAnna Cameron as Wanda Olivia Wellman
