= Margaret Markov =

American actress

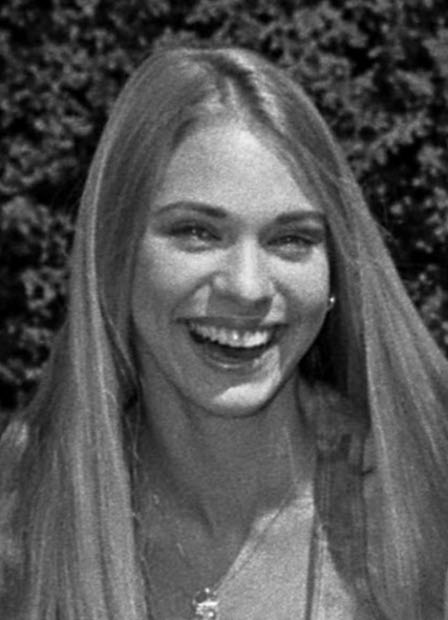
- Markov in 1970
- Occupation: Actress
- Years active: 1969–1974, 1997
- Spouse: Mark Damon (m. 1974; died 2024)

Margaret Markov is an American retired actress. She had a supporting role in the romantic drama The Sterile Cuckoo (1969) with Liza Minnelli and co-starred in There Is No 13 (1974), as well as appearing in other films.

She was in the 1969 outlaw biker film Run, Angel, Run directed by Jack Starrett and the 1972 women in prison film The Hot Box co-written by Jonathan Demme.

She also appeared in the dark sex comedy/murder mystery Pretty Maids All in a Row (1971) with Rock Hudson, directed by Roger Vadim, whom she dated. Markov also starred opposite Pam Grier in two films: the 1972 Black Mama, White Mama and the 1974 film The Arena (aka Naked Warriors). During the making of the latter, she started dating producer Mark Damon; the two later married and Markov retired.

== Partial filmography ==
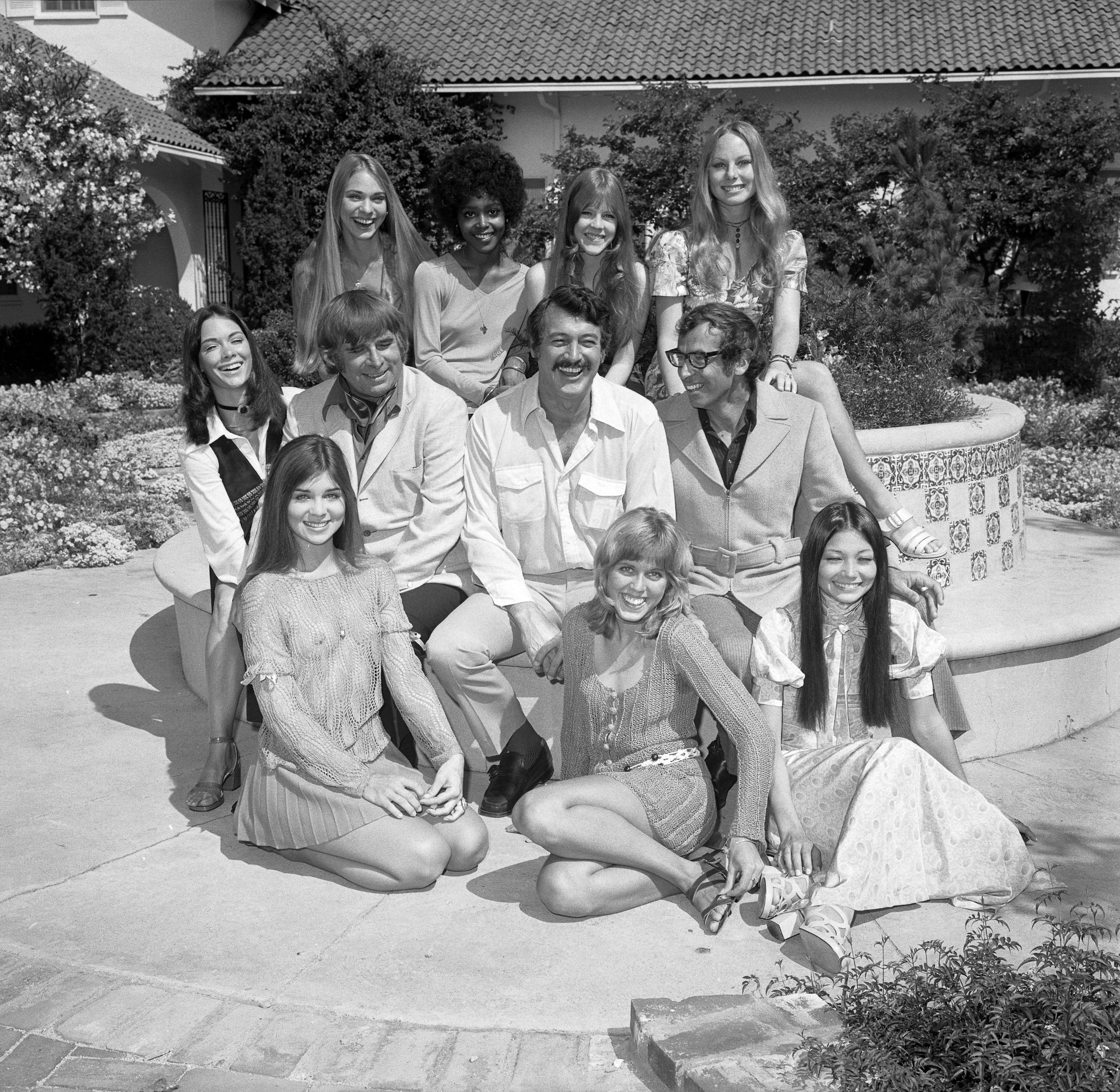
Cast of Pretty Maids All in a Row (L-R): (front row) June Fairchild, Joy Bang, Aimee Eccles; (middle row) Joanna Cameron, Gene Roddenberry, Rock Hudson, Roger Vadim; (back row) Margaret Markov, Brenda Sykes, Diane Sherry, Gretchen Burell

- Run, Angel, Run (1969) as Meg Felton
- The Sterile Cuckoo (1969) (uncredited)
- Pretty Maids All in a Row (1971) as Polly
- The Hot Box (1972) as Lynn Forrest
- Black Mama, White Mama (1972) as Karen Brent
- Hawkins: Death and the Maiden (TV movie, 1973) as Theresa Ruth Colman
- The Arena (1974) as Bodicia
- There Is No 13 (1974) as Number Eleven
