= June Fairchild =

American dancer and actress (1946–2015)

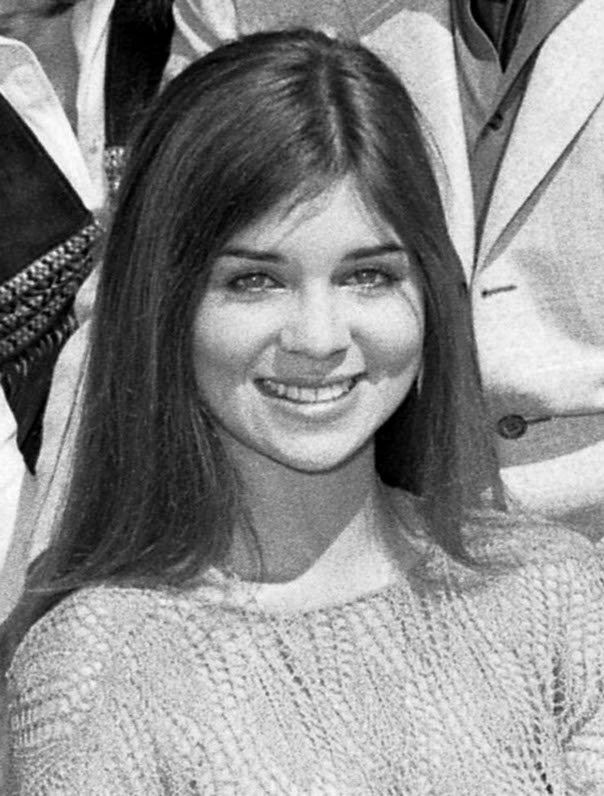
- Fairchild in 1970
- Born: June Edna Wilson; September 3, 1946; Manhattan Beach, California, U.S.
- Died: February 17, 2015 (aged 68); Los Angeles, California, U.S.
- Education: El Camino College
- Occupations: Dancer; actress
- Years active: 1966–1978
- Spouse: married twice (1 child)

June Edna Fairchild (born June Edna Wilson; September 3, 1946 – February 17, 2015) was an American dancer and actress. Fairchild starred or co-starred in more than a dozen film roles before her addictions to drugs and alcohol effectively ended her professional acting career.

== Early life ==
Fairchild was born June Edna Wilson on September 3, 1946, in Manhattan Beach, California. Her father was a musician who specialized in writing gospel songs and music. Fairchild was raised in Manhattan Beach and graduated in 1964 from Aviation High School in Redondo Beach. She attended El Camino College and acted the youthful role of Arthur in the college production of Shakespeare'sThe Life and Death of King John in April 1965.

== Career ==
=== Gazzarri Dancer on Hollywood A Go-Go ===
By mid-1965 Fairchild had been hired as a member of the Gazzarri Dancers on the syndicated variety show Hollywood A Go-Go after being recruited by the show's executive producer Al Burton. She remained on the show until its final episode, broadcast in February 1966.

While on the show, June Fairchild and fellow dancer Mimi Machu created the Statue dance, a fad dance in which the dancers adopt stationary poses for a measure or two before shifting to new poses. The dance was performed on a number of episodes, including the one broadcast on November 6, 1965, in which Tommy Sands performed his record "The Statue", a song about the dance. Host Sam Riddle's introduction acknowledged Fairchild and Machu as the originators of the Statue dance, which had already spread to some public dance venues.

=== Years of success ===
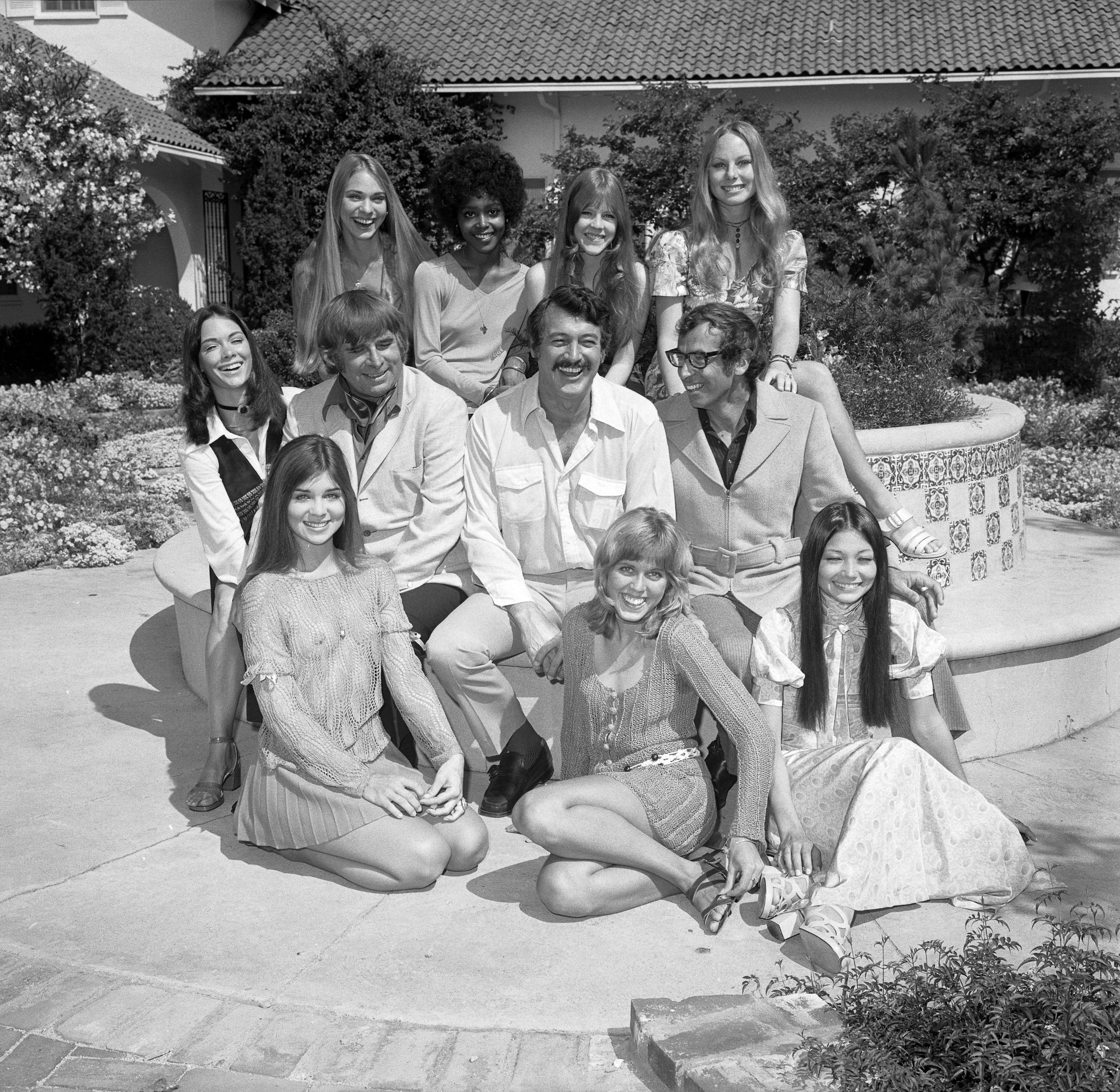
Cast of Pretty Maids All in a Row pictured in September 1970 (L-R): (front row) June Fairchild, Joy Bang, Aimee Eccles; (middle row) Joanna Cameron, Gene Roddenberry, Rock Hudson, Roger Vadim; (back row) Margaret Markov, Brenda Sykes, Diane Sherry, Gretchen Burrell

During the 1960s, Fairchild lived with her then-boyfriend Danny Hutton, the lead singer of Three Dog Night, for several years. Despite some disagreement about the veracity of the claim, Fairchild was credited with conceiving the band's name, Three Dog Night.

Fairchild co-starred in Head, a vehicle for The Monkees, in 1968; in Drive, He Said, directed by Jack Nicholson; and Pretty Maids All in a Row, directed by Roger Vadim, in 1971; in Thunderbolt and Lightfoot, which starred Clint Eastwood and Jeff Bridges, in 1974; and in the 1978 Cheech & Chong film, Up in Smoke, in which she appeared as a drug addict who snorts Ajax powdered cleanser.

=== Decline ===
In her later life Fairchild lived on the streets of Skid Row, Los Angeles due to her addictions.

In 2001, a reporter for the Los Angeles Times ran a story about Fairchild's past career in Hollywood and her present life on the streets of Los Angeles. Fairchild was selling newspapers outside a Los Angeles courthouse at the time in an attempt to earn enough money for a single-room occupancy hotel room. On February 21, 2001, the same day that her story was published in the Los Angeles Times, police stopped her in Van Nuys for carrying an open container. A police officer recognized her picture from the newspaper and arrested her for failure to complete her community service from a past drunk driving conviction. Fairchild was sentenced to 90 days. In 2002, Fairchild told the Los Angeles Times that her sentence had triggered a pledge of sobriety. Friends told reporters that Fairchild remained sober until her death in 2015.

She spent the later years of her life living in single-room hotels in downtown Los Angeles using her Social Security disability payments.

== Death ==
She died from liver cancer at a convalescent home in Los Angeles on February 17, 2015, at the age of 68. She had been divorced twice.

== Partial filmography ==
- Where Angels Go, Trouble Follows (1968) - June
- Head (1968) - The Jumper
- Pretty Maids All in a Row (1971) - Sonny
- Drive, He Said (1971) - Sylvie
- Summertree (1971) - Girl in Dorm
- Top of the Heap (1972) - Balloon Thrower
- Your Three Minutes Are Up (1973) - Sandi
- Detroit 9000 (1973) - Barbara (uncredited)
- Thunderbolt and Lightfoot (1974) - Gloria
- Dirty O'Neil (1974) - Hitchhiker
- The Student Body (1976) - Mitzi
- Sextette (1978) - Woman Reporter
- Up in Smoke (1978) - Ajax Lady (final film role)
