= List of American films of 1971 =

This is a list of American films released in 1971.

== Box office ==
The highest-grossing American films released in 1971, by domestic box office gross revenue as estimated by The Numbers, are as follows:

Highest-grossing films of 1971
Rank	Title	Distributor	Domestic gross
1	Billy Jack	Warner Bros.	$98,000,000
2	Fiddler on the Roof	United Artists	$78,722,370
3	The French Connection	20th Century Fox	$51,000,000
4	Diamonds Are Forever	United Artists	$43,800,000
5	Summer of '42	Warner Bros.	$32,063,634
6	Dirty Harry	Warner Bros.	$28,153,434
7	A Clockwork Orange	Warner Bros.	$26,589,355
8	The Last Picture Show	Columbia	$20,505,085
9	Bedknobs and Broomsticks	Walt Disney	$17,871,174
10	Sweet Sweetback's Baadasssss Song	Cinemation Industries	$15,200,000

== January–March ==
Opening		Title	Production company	Cast and crew	Ref.
J A N U A R Y	1	Punishment Park	Project X Distribution / Chartwell / Francoise	Peter Watkins (director/screenplay); Carmen Argenziano, Harold Beaulieu, Jim Bohan, Stan Armsted, Paul Alelyanes, Mark Keats, Gladys Golden, Sanford Golden, George Gregory, Katherine Quittner, Mary Ellen Kleinhall	
J A N U A R Y	1	Something Big	National General Pictures	Andrew V. McLaglen (director); James Lee Barrett (screenplay); Dean Martin, Brian Keith, Carol White, Honor Blackman, Ben Johnson, Albert Salmi, Don Knight, Joyce Van Patten, Judi Meredith, Denver Pyle, Merlin Olsen, Robert Donner, Harry Carey Jr., Paul Fix, Bob Steele, Ed Faulkner, David Huddleston, Jose Angel Espinoza, Chuck Hicks, Enrique Lucero, Joe Gray, Armand Alzamora, Juan Garcia, Robert Gravage	
J A N U A R Y	8	The Ski Bum	Embassy Pictures	Bruce D. Clark (director/screenplay); Marc Siegler (screenplay); Zalman King, Charlotte Rampling, Joseph Mell, Dimitra Arliss, Pierre Jalbert, Anna Karen Morrow, Paul Jabara, Michael Lerner, Noah Keen, Penelope Spheeris, Tedd King, Dwight Marfield, Freddie James, Lori Shelle, Don Campbell, David Chow, Deborah Smaller	
J A N U A R Y	21	Zachariah	Cinerama Releasing Corporation / ABC Pictures	George Englund (director); Joe Massot, Phil Austin, Peter Bergman, David Ossman, Phil Proctor (screenplay); John Rubinstein, Pat Quinn, Don Johnson, Country Joe and the Fish, Elvin Jones, Doug Kershaw, William Challee, Dick Van Patten, The James Gang, White Lightnin', The New York Rock Ensemble	
J A N U A R Y	24	The Music Lovers	United Artists / Russ-Arts / Russ Films	Ken Russell (director); Melvyn Bragg (screenplay); Richard Chamberlain, Glenda Jackson, Max Adrian, Christopher Gable, Kenneth Colley, Maureen Pryor, Andrew Faulds, Bruce Robinson, Ben Aris, Georgina Parkinson, Graham Armitage, Izabella Telezynska, Sabina Maydelle, Xavier Russell, Dennis Myers, John Myers, Joanne Brown, Alexei Jawdokimov, Alexander Russell, Clive Cazes, Alan Dubreuil, Ernest Bale, Consuela Chapman, James Russell, Victoria Russell, Alex Brewer	
J A N U A R Y	24	10 Rillington Place	Columbia Pictures / Filmways Pictures / Genesis Productions	Richard Fleischer (director); Clive Exton (screenplay); Richard Attenborough, Judy Geeson, John Hurt, Pat Heywood, Isobel Black, Robert Hardy, Geoffrey Chater, André Morell, Sam Kydd, Jimmy Gardner, Gabrielle Daye, Rudolph Walker, Phyllis MacMahon, Ray Barron, Douglas Blackwell, Edward Evans, Tenniel Evans, Basil Dignam, Edward Burnham, Reg Lye	
J A N U A R Y	24	The Last Valley	Cinerama Releasing Corporation / ABC Pictures Corporation / Season Productions	James Clavell (director/screenplay); Michael Caine, Omar Sharif, Florinda Bolkan, Nigel Davenport, Per Oscarsson, Arthur O'Connell, Madeleine Hinde, Yorgo Voyagis, Vladek Sheybal, Miguel Alejandro, Christian Roberts, Brian Blessed, Ian Hogg, Michael Gothard, George Innes, John Hallam, Leon Lissek	
F E B R U A R Y	3	Carry On Henry	The Rank Organisation	Gerald Thomas (director); Talbot Rothwell (screenplay); Sid James, Kenneth Williams, Charles Hawtrey, Joan Sims, Terry Scott, Barbara Windsor, Kenneth Connor, Julian Holloway, Peter Gilmore, Peter Butterworth, Julian Orchard, Gertan Klauber, Margaret Nolan	
F E B R U A R Y	3	Doctors' Wives	Columbia Pictures / Frankovich Productions	George Schaefer (director); Daniel Taradash (screenplay); Dyan Cannon, Richard Crenna, Gene Hackman, Carroll O'Connor, Rachel Roberts, Janice Rule, Diana Sands, Cara Williams, Richard Anderson, Ralph Bellamy, George Gaynes, John Colicos, Marian McCargo, Scott Brady, Kristina Holland, Anthony Costello, Mark Jenkins, Vincent Van Lynn, Ernie Barnes, Paul Marin, William Bramley, Jon Lormer	
F E B R U A R Y	4	King Lear	Columbia Pictures / Filmways / Royal Shakespeare Company	Peter Brook (director/screenplay); William Shakespeare (screenplay); Paul Scofield, Cyril Cusack, Susan Engel, Tom Fleming, Anne-Lise Gabold, Ian Hogg, Søren Elung Jensen, Robert Lloyd, Jack MacGowran, Patrick Magee, Barry Stanton, Alan Webb, Irene Worth	
F E B R U A R Y	9	How to Frame a Figg	Universal Pictures	Alan Rafkin (director); George Tibbles (screenplay); Don Knotts, Joe Flynn, Elaine Joyce, Edward Andrews, Yvonne Craig, Frank Welker, Parker Fennelly, Bill Zuckert, Bob Hastings, Bruce Kirby, Stuart Nisbet, James Millhollin, Bill Quinn, John Archer, Pitt Herbert, Robert P. Lieb, Fay DeWitt, Savannah Bentley, Athena Lorde	
F E B R U A R Y	9	Little Murders	20th Century Fox / Brodsky-Gould Productions	Alan Arkin (director); Jules Feiffer (screenplay); Elliott Gould, Marcia Rodd, Vincent Gardenia, Elizabeth Wilson, Jon Korkes, John Randolph, Doris Roberts, Donald Sutherland, Lou Jacobi, Alan Arkin, Martin Kove	
F E B R U A R Y	12	Raid on Rommel	Universal Pictures	Henry Hathaway (director); Richard M. Bluel (screenplay); Richard Burton, John Colicos, Clinton Greyn, Wolfgang Preiss, Danielle De Metz, Karl-Otto Alberty, John Orchard, Brook Williams, Greg Mullavy, Ben Wright, Christopher Cary, Michael Sevareid, Chris Anders	
F E B R U A R Y	14	Countess Dracula	Rank Film Distributors / Hammer Film Productions	Peter Sasdy (director); Jeremy Paul (screenplay); Ingrid Pitt, Nigel Green, Sandor Elès, Maurice Denham, Patience Collier, Lesley-Anne Down, Peter Jeffrey, Leon Lissek, Jessie Evans, Andria Lawrence, Susan Brodrick, Niké Arrighi, Marianne Stone, Charles Farrell, Anne Stallybrass, Ian Trigger	
F E B R U A R Y	15	Gas-s-s-s	American International Pictures / San Jacinto Productions	Roger Corman (director); George Armitage (screenplay); Robert Corff, Elaine Giftos, Bud Cort, Talia Shire, Ben Vereen, Cindy Williams, George Armitage, Country Joe McDonald, Alex Wilson, Pat Patterson, Gary Caplan	
F E B R U A R Y	19	Cold Turkey	United Artists / Tandem Productions	Norman Lear (director/screenplay); William Price Fox Jr. (screenplay); Dick Van Dyke, Bob Newhart, Pippa Scott, Tom Poston, Edward Everett Horton, Bob Elliott, Ray Goulding, Vincent Gardenia, Barnard Hughes, Graham Jarvis	
F E B R U A R Y	19	One More Train to Rob	Universal Pictures	Andrew V. McLaglen (director); Don Tait, Dick Nelson (screenplay); George Peppard, Diana Muldaur, John Vernon, France Nuyen, Soon-Tek Oh, Steve Sandor, Pamela McMyler, Richard Loo, Robert Donner, John Doucette, C.K. Yang, Marie Windsor, Timothy Scott, Joan Shawlee, Hal Needham, Harry Carey Jr.	
F E B R U A R Y	23	The Pursuit of Happiness	Columbia Pictures	Robert Mulligan (director); Jon Boothe, George L. Sherman (screenplay); Michael Sarrazin, Barbara Hershey, Robert Klein, Sada Thompson, Ralph Waite, Arthur Hill, E. G. Marshall, Maya Kenin, Rue McClanahan, Peter White, Joseph Attles, Beulah Garrick, Ruth White, Charles Durning, Barnard Hughes, David Doyle, Gilbert Lewis, Albert Henderson, William Devane	
F E B R U A R Y	28	Wanda	Bardene International Films / Foundation for Filmmakers	Barbara Loden (director/screenplay); Barbara Loden, Michael Higgins, Frank Jourdano, Valerie Manches, Dorothy Shupenes, Peter Shupenes, Jerome Thier, Marian Thier, Anthony Rotell, M.L. Kennedy	
M A R C H	2	Death in Venice (France/Italy)	Warner Bros. / Alfa Cinematografica / PECF	Luchino Visconti (director/screenplay); Nicola Badalucco (screenplay); Dirk Bogarde, Björn Andrésen, Mark Burns, Romolo Valli, Nora Ricci, Marisa Berenson, Carole André, Silvana Mangano, Leslie French, Franco Fabrizi, Dominique Darel, Mascia Predit, Nicoletta Elmi, Marco Tulli, Sergio Garfagnoli, Luigi Battaglia, Ciro Cristofoletti	
M A R C H	8	The Emigrants (Sweden)	Warner Bros. / Svensk Filmindustri	Jan Troell (director/screenplay); Bengt Forslund (screenplay); Max von Sydow, Liv Ullmann, Eddie Axberg, Allan Edwall, Monica Zetterlund, Pierre Lindstedt, Hans Alfredson, Åke Fridell, Agneta Prytz, Halvar Björk, Tom C. Fouts, Sven-Olof Bern, Aina Alfredsson, Ulla Smidje, Eva-Lena Zetterlund, Gustaf Färingborg, Arnold Alfredsson, Bror Englund, Bruno Sörwing	
M A R C H	9	When Eight Bells Toll	Cinerama Releasing Corporation / Gershwin-Kastner Productions / Winkast Film Production	Étienne Périer (director); Alistair MacLean (screenplay); Anthony Hopkins, Robert Morley, Nathalie Delon, Jack Hawkins, Corin Redgrave, Derek Bond, Ferdy Mayne, Maurice Roëves	
M A R C H	10	Get Carter	MGM-EMI Distributors / MGM-British Studios	Mike Hodges (director/screenplay); Michael Caine, Ian Hendry, John Osborne, Britt Ekland, Bryan Mosley, George Sewell, Tony Beckley, Glynn Edwards, Alun Armstrong, Bernard Hepton, Petra Markham, Geraldine Moffat, Dorothy White, Rosemarie Dunham, John Bindon, Terence Rigby, Godfrey Quigley, Kevin Brennan, Ben Aris, Alexander Morton, John Quarmby	
M A R C H	11	Lawman	United Artists	Michael Winner (director); Gerry Wilson (screenplay); Burt Lancaster, Robert Ryan, Lee J. Cobb, Sheree North, Robert Duvall, Albert Salmi, J. D. Cannon, John McGiver, Joseph Wiseman, Richard Jordan, Ralph Waite, John Beck, William C. Watson, Walter Brooke, Robert Emhardt, Charles Tyner, Lou Frizzell, Richard Bull, John Hillerman, Roy Engel, Hugh McDermott, Wilford Brimley, Claudia Bryar, Laila Novak	
M A R C H	11	A New Leaf	Paramount Pictures	Elaine May (director/screenplay); Walter Matthau, Elaine May, Jack Weston, George Rose, James Coco, Doris Roberts, Renée Taylor, David Doyle, William Redfield, Graham Jarvis, Jess Osuna, Fred Stewart, Mark Gordon, Rose Arrick, Conrad Bain, Mildred Clinton, William Hickey	
M A R C H	11	THX 1138	Warner Bros. / American Zoetrope	George Lucas (director/screenplay); Walter Murch (screenplay); Robert Duvall, Donald Pleasence, Maggie McOmie, Don Pedro Colley, Ian Wolfe, Marshall Efron, Sid Haig, John Pearce, James Wheaton, Scott Beach, Terence McGovern, David Ogden Stiers	
M A R C H	11	Up Pompeii	MGM-EMI / Anglo-EMI / London Associated Films	Bob Kellett (director); Sid Colin (screenplay); Frankie Howerd, Michael Hordern, Barbara Murray, Patrick Cargill, Lance Percival, Bill Fraser, Julie Ege, Adrienne Posta, Bernard Bresslaw, Madeline Smith, Roy Hudd, Hugh Paddick	
M A R C H	12	The Andromeda Strain	Universal Pictures	Robert Wise (director); Nelson Gidding (screenplay); Arthur Hill, James Olson, David Wayne, Kate Reid, Paula Kelly, George Mitchell, Mark Jenkins	
M A R C H	13	Vanishing Point	20th Century Fox / Cupid Productions	Richard C. Sarafian (director); Guillermo Cain (screenplay); Barry Newman, Cleavon Little, Dean Jagger, Victoria Medlin, Karl Swenson, Lee Weaver, John Amos, Tom Reese, Paul Koslo, Robert Donner	
M A R C H	17	The Barefoot Executive	Walt Disney Productions / Buena Vista Distribution	Robert Butler (director); Joseph L. McEveety (screenplay); Kurt Russell, Joe Flynn, Harry Morgan, Wally Cox, Heather North, Alan Hewitt, Hayden Rorke, John Ritter	
M A R C H	21	Making It	20th Century Fox / Alfran Productions	John Erman (director); Peter Bart (screenplay); Kristoffer Tabori, Marlyn Mason, Bob Balaban, Joyce Van Patten, Paul Appleby, Carol Arthur, David Doyle, John Fiedler, Pamela Hensley, Casey King, Louise Latham, Doro Merande, Sherry Miles, Denny Miller, Lawrence Pressman, Maxine Stuart, Tom Troupe, Dick Van Patten	
M A R C H	24	Brother John	Columbia Pictures / E&R	James Goldstone (director); Ernest Kinoy (screenplay); Sidney Poitier, Will Geer, Bradford Dillman, Beverly Todd, Ramon Bieri, Lincoln Kilpatrick, P. Jay Sidney, Richard Ward, Paul Winfield, Zara Cully, Michael Bell, Lynn Hamilton, Warren J. Kemmerling, Howard Rice, Darlene Rice, Harry Davis	
M A R C H	24	Friends	Paramount British Pictures / Lewis Gilbert Productions	Lewis Gilbert (director); Vernon Harris, Jack Russell (screenplay); Sean Bury, Anicée Alvina, Ronald Lewis, Toby Robins, Joan Hickson, Pascale Roberts, Sady Rebbot	
M A R C H	25	The Deserter	Paramount Pictures / Dino de Laurentiis Cinematografica	Burt Kennedy (director); Clair Huffaker (screenplay); Bekim Fehmiu, John Huston, Richard Crenna, Chuck Connors, Ricardo Montalbán, Ian Bannen, Brandon deWilde, Slim Pickens, Woody Strode, Albert Salmi, Patrick Wayne, Fausto Tozzi, Mimmo Palmara, John Alderson, Larry Stewart	
M A R C H	28	The Battle of Love's Return	Troma Entertainment	Lloyd Kaufman (director/screenplay); Lloyd Kaufman, Lynn Lowry, Oliver Stone, Andy Kay, Stanley Kaufman	
M A R C H	28	Taking Off	Universal Pictures	Miloš Forman (director/screenplay); Jean-Claude Carrière, John Guare, John Klein (screenplay); Lynn Carlin, Buck Henry, Georgia Engel, Audra Lindley, Paul Benedict, Vincent Schiavelli, Ike Turner, Tina Turner, Rae Allen, Philip Bruns, Allen Garfield, Carly Simon, Bobo Bates, Shellen Lubin, Shelley Ackerman, Jessica Harper, Tony Harvey, David Gittler, Linnea Heacock, Corinna Cristobal, Frank Berle, Gail Busman, Lois Dengrove, Bonnie Marcus	
M A R C H	31	B.S. I Love You	20th Century Fox	Steven Hilliard Stern (director/screenplay); Peter Kastner, Joanna Cameron, Louise Sorel, Gary Burghoff, Joanna Barnes, Richard B. Shull	
M A R C H	31	Just Before Nightfall (France)	Cinegai S.p.A. / Les Films de la Boétie	Claude Chabrol (director/screenplay); Stéphane Audran, François Périer, Michel Bouquet, Jean Carmet, Henri Attal, Dominique Zardi, Michel Duchaussoy, Celia, Marina Ninchi, Anna Douking	

== April–June ==
Opening		Title	Production company	Cast and crew	Ref.
A P R I L	7	Shinbone Alley	Allied Artists / Fine Arts Films	John David Wilson (director); Joe Darion (screenplay); Carol Channing, Eddie Bracken, Alan Reed, John Carradine, Hal Smith, Joan Gerber, Ken Sansom, Julie Dawn Cole, Sal Delano, Byron Kane	
A P R I L	7	The Zodiac Killer	Adventure Productions, Inc.	Tom Hanson (director); Ray Cantrell, Manny Cardoza (screenplay); Hal Reed, Bob Jones, Ray Lynch, Tom Pittman, Mary Darrington, Frank Sanabek, Ed Quigley, Bertha Dahl, Dion Marinkovich, Doodles Weaver, Gloria Gunn, Richard Styles, Manny Cardoza, Norma Takaki, Donna Register	
A P R I L	9	The Mephisto Waltz	20th Century Fox	Paul Wendkos (director); Ben Maddow (screenplay); Alan Alda, Jacqueline Bisset, Barbara Parkins, Bradford Dillman, William Windom, Kathleen Widdoes, Pamelyn Ferdin, Curd Jürgens	
A P R I L	9	Summer of '42	Warner Bros. / Mulligan-Roth Productions	Robert Mulligan (director); Herman Raucher (screenplay); Jennifer O'Neill, Gary Grimes, Jerry Houser, Christopher Norris, Lou Frizzell, Maureen Stapleton, Robert Mulligan, Oliver Conant, Katherine Allentuck, Walter Scott	
A P R I L	9	Valdez Is Coming	United Artists	Edwin Sherin (director); Roland Kibbee, David Rayfiel (screenplay); Burt Lancaster, Susan Clark, Jon Cypher, Frank Silvera, Héctor Elizondo, Phil Brown, Richard Jordan, Barton Heyman, Ralph Brown, Werner Hasselmann, Lex Monson, Sylvia Poggioli, José García García, María Montez, Juanita Penaloza	
A P R I L	16	The Blood on Satan's Claw	Tigon Pictures / Tigon British Film Productions / Chilton Film and Television Enterprises	Piers Haggard (director/screenplay); Robert Wynne-Simmons (screenplay); Patrick Wymark, Linda Hayden, Barry Andrews, Michele Dotrice, Wendy Padbury, Anthony Ainley, Charlotte Mitchell, Tamara Ustinov, Simon Williams, James Hayter, Howard Goorney, Avice Landone, Robin Davies, Godfrey James, Roberta Tovey	
A P R I L	21	Melody	British Lion Films / Hemdale Group / Sagittarius Productions / Goodtimes Enterprises	Waris Hussein (director); Alan Parker (screenplay); Mark Lester, Tracy Hyde, Jack Wild, Ashley Knight, William Vanderpuye, Sheila Steafel, Keith Barron, Kate Williams, Roy Kinnear, James Cossins, Ken Jones, June Jago, Tim Wylton, John Gorman, Robin Hunter, Tracy Reed, Neil Hallett, Colin Barrie, Billy Franks, Craig Marriott, Peter Walton, Camille Davies, Dawn Hope, Kay Skinner, Lesley Roach, Hilda Barry, June C. Ellis, Petal Young, Leonard Brockwell, Stephen Mallett	
A P R I L	23	Sweet Sweetback's Baadasssss Song	Cinemation Industries / Yeah, Inc.	Melvin Van Peebles (director/screenplay); Melvin Van Peebles, John Dullaghan, Rhetta Hughes, John Amos, Mario Van Peebles, Hubert Scales, Simon Chuckster, West Gale, Niva Rochelle, Nick Ferrari, Ed Rue, Lavelle Roby, Ted Hayden	
A P R I L	24	The Cat (France)	Valoria Films	Pierre Granier-Deferre (director/screenplay); Pascal Jardin, Georges Simenon (screenplay); Jean Gabin, Simone Signoret, Annie Cordy, Jacques Rispal, Harry-Max, André Rouyer, Yves Barsacq, Nicole Desailly, Carlo Nell, Florence Haguenauer, Renate Birgo, Ermanno Casanova, Georges Mansart, Isabel del Río	
A P R I L	28	Bananas	United Artists	Woody Allen (director/screenplay); Woody Allen, Louise Lasser, Carlos Montalban, Natividad Abascal, Howard Cosell, Jacobo Morales, Miguel Ángel Suárez, René Enríquez, Roger Grimsby, Don Dunphy, Dan Frazer, Charlotte Rae, Axel Anderson, Arthur Hughes, Eddie Barth, Nicholas Saunders, Conrad Bain, Allen Garfield, Hy Anzell, Sylvester Stallone, Mary Jo Catlett, Tino García, David Ortiz, Jack Axelrod, Martha Greenhouse, Stanley Ackerman	
A P R I L	28	Pretty Maids All in a Row	Metro-Goldwyn-Mayer	Roger Vadim (director); Gene Roddenberry (screenplay); Rock Hudson, Angie Dickinson, Telly Savalas, John David Carson, Keenan Wynn, Barbara Leigh, Roddy McDowall, James Doohan, William Campbell, Susan Tolsky, Brenda Sykes, Joy Bang, Joanna Cameron, June Fairchild, Margaret Markov, Philip Brown, Kyle Johnson, Linda Morand, Topo Swope, Gretchen Burrell, Aimee Eccles, Diane Sherry, Mark Malmborg, Warren Seabury, Dawn Roddenberry	
A P R I L	30	The Big Doll House	New World Pictures	Jack Hill (director); Don Spencer (screenplay); Pam Grier, Roberta Collins, Sid Haig, Pat Woodell, Christiane Schmidtmer, Judy Brown, Brooke Mills, Kathryn Loder	
M A Y	1	Billy Jack	Warner Bros. / National Student Film Corporation	T.C. Frank (director); Frank Christina, Theresa Christina (screenplay); Tom Laughlin, Delores Taylor, Clark Howat, Bert Freed, Kenneth Tobey, Howard Hesseman, Cisse Cameron, Han Bong-soo, David Roya, Victor Izay, Julie Webb, Debbie Schock, Teresa Kelly, Lynn Baker, Stan Rice, John McClure, Susan Foster, Susan Sosa	
M A Y	12	Mrs. Pollifax-Spy	United Artists	Leslie H. Martinson (director); C.A. McKnight (screenplay); Rosalind Russell, Darren McGavin, Nehemiah Persoff, Harold Gould, Albert Paulsen, John Beck, Dana Elcar, Dennis Cross, Don Diamond, Robert Donner, James Wellman, Nick Katurich, Tom Hallick	
M A Y	12	Plaza Suite	Paramount Pictures	Arthur Hiller (director); Neil Simon (screenplay); Walter Matthau, Maureen Stapleton, Barbara Harris, Lee Grant, Louise Sorel, Jenny Sullivan, Augusta Dabney, Alan North, Frank Albanese, Jordan Charney, Thomas Carey	
M A Y	12	Red Sky at Morning	Universal Pictures / Hal Wallis Productions	James Goldstone (director); Marguerite Roberts (screenplay); Richard Thomas, Catherine Burns, Desi Arnaz Jr., Richard Crenna, Claire Bloom, John Colicos, Harry Guardino, Strother Martin, Nehemiah Persoff, Pepe Serna, Joaquin Garay	
M A Y	13	Wake in Fright	United Artists / NLT Productions / Group W Films	Ted Kotcheff (director); Evan Jones (screenplay); Gary Bond, Donald Pleasence, Chips Rafferty, Sylvia Kay, Jack Thompson, John Meillon, Slim De Grey, Maggie Dence, Dawn Lake, Bob McDarra, Peter Whittle, Al Thomas, John Armstrong, Norman Erskine, Buster Fiddess, Tex Foote, Nancy Knudsen	
M A Y	14	Johnny Got His Gun	Cinemation Industries / World Entertainment	Dalton Trumbo (director/screenplay); Timothy Bottoms, Jason Robards, Donald Sutherland, Kathy Fields, Marsha Hunt, David Soul, Anthony Geary, Charles McGraw, Sandy Brown Wyeth, Don 'Red' Barry, Diane Varsi	
M A Y	18	The Abominable Dr. Phibes	American International Pictures	Robert Fuest (director/screenplay); William Goldstein, James Whiton (screenplay); Vincent Price, Joseph Cotten, Peter Jeffrey, Virginia North, Hugh Griffith, Terry-Thomas, Derek Godfrey, Norman Jones, John Cater, Aubrey Woods, John Laurie, Maurice Kaufmann, Sean Bury, Susan Travers, David Hutcheson, Edward Burnham, Alex Scott, Peter Gilmore, Caroline Munro	
M A Y	21	Escape from the Planet of the Apes	20th Century Fox / APJAC Productions	Don Taylor (director); Paul Dehn (screenplay); Roddy McDowall, Kim Hunter, Bradford Dillman, Natalie Trundy, Eric Braeden, Sal Mineo, Ricardo Montalbán, William Windom, Albert Salmi, Jason Evers, John Randolph, Harry Lauter, M. Emmet Walsh, Roy Glenn, Peter Forster, Bill Bonds, James Bacon, Charlton Heston	
M A Y	24	Pink Narcissus	Sherpix	James Bidgood (director/screenplay); Charles Ludlam, Bobby Kendall, Don Brooks	
M A Y	26	Big Jake	Cinema Center Films / Batjac Productions	George Sherman (director/screenplay); Harry Julian Fink, R. M. Fink (screenplay); John Wayne, Richard Boone, Maureen O'Hara, Patrick Wayne, Christopher Mitchum, Bruce Cabot, Bobby Vinton, Glenn Corbett, John Doucette, Jim Davis, John Agar, Harry Carey Jr., Gregg Palmer, Dean Smith, Roy Jenson, Virginia Capers, Hank Worden, Ethan Wayne, William Walker, George Fenneman, Tom Hennesy, Chuck Roberson, Jim Burk, Robert Warner, Jeff Wingfield, Everett Creach	
M A Y	26	Support Your Local Gunfighter	United Artists	Burt Kennedy (director); James Edward Grant (screenplay); James Garner, Suzanne Pleshette, Harry Morgan, Jack Elam, John Dehner, Marie Windsor, Roy Glenn, Dick Curtis, Dub Taylor, Joan Blondell, Ellen Corby, Kathleen Freeman, Virginia Capers, Henry Jones, Willis Bouchey, Walter Burke, Ben Cooper, Grady Sutton, Herb Vigran, Pedro Gonzalez Gonzalez, Gene Evans, Terry Wilson, John Wheeler, Dick Haynes, David S. Cass Sr., Chuck Connors, James Nolan, Max Wagner	
M A Y	26	Villain	MGM-EMI / Anglo-EMI	Michael Tuchner (director); Dick Clement, Ian La Frenais (screenplay); Richard Burton, Ian McShane, Nigel Davenport, Donald Sinden, Fiona Lewis, T. P. McKenna, Joss Ackland, Cathleen Nesbitt, Colin Welland, Elizabeth Knight, Tony Selby, Del Henney, Ben Howard, James Cossins, John Hallam, Anthony Sagar, Clive Francis, Brook Williams, Michael Robbins, Sheila White, Cheryl Hall, Shirley Cain, Godfrey James, Bonnie Lythgoe, Leslie Schofield, John Comer, Johnny Shannon	
M A Y	28	The Beguiled	Universal Pictures / The Malpaso Company	Don Siegel (director); Albert Maltz, Irene Kamp (screenplay); Clint Eastwood, Geraldine Page, Elizabeth Hartman, Jo Ann Harris, Darleen Carr, Mae Mercer, Pamelyn Ferdin, Melody Thomas Scott, Peggy Drier, Pattye Mattick	
M A Y	28	The Grissom Gang	Cinerama Releasing Corporation / ABC Pictures / The Associates & Aldrich Company	Robert Aldrich (director); Leon Griffiths (screenplay); Kim Darby, Scott Wilson, Tony Musante, Robert Lansing, Irene Dailey, Connie Stevens, Wesley Addy, Don Keefer, Joey Faye, Ralph Waite, Hal Baylor, Matt Clark, Dots Johnson, Dave Willock, Raymond Guth, Dick Miller, Michael Baseleon, Alvin Hammer, Mort Marshall, Alex Wilson, John Steadman	
J U N E	2	The Young Graduates	Crown International Pictures / Tempo Enterprises	Robert Anderson (director/screenplay); Terry Anderson (screenplay); Bruno Kirby, Dennis Christopher, Patricia Wymer, Steven Stewart, Gary Rist, Jennifer Ritt, Marly Holiday, Anthony Mannino, Robert Almanza, Joe Pepe, Max Manning, Frances Tremaine, Tom Benko, Pat Russell	
J U N E	5	The Ceremony (Japan)	Art Theatre Guild	Nagisa Ōshima (director/screenplay); Mamoru Sasaki, Tsutomu Tamura (screenplay); Nobuko Otowa, Kei Satō, Atsuo Nakamura, Akiko Koyama, Fumio Watanabe, Rokko Toura, Eitaro Ozawa, Kenzo Kawarasaki, Atsuko Kaku, Kiyoshi Tsuchiya, Hosei Komatsu	
J U N E	9	The Deadly Trap	National General Pictures	René Clément (director/screenplay); Daniel Boulanger, Sidney Buchman (screenplay); Faye Dunaway, Frank Langella, Barbara Parkins, Raymond Gérôme, Gérard Buhr, Maurice Ronet, Jill Larson, Franco Ressel, Dora van der Groen, Karen Blanguernon, Michèle Lourie, Patrick Vincent, Louise Chevalier, Tener Eckelberry, Massimo Farinelli, Robert Lussac	
J U N E	9	They Might Be Giants	Universal Pictures / Newman-Foreman Company	Anthony Harvey (director); James Goldman (screenplay); George C. Scott, Joanne Woodward, Jack Gilford, Lester Rawlins, Al Lewis, Rue McClanahan, Ron Weyand, Oliver Clark, Theresa Merritt, Jenny Egan, Michael McGuire, Eugene Roche, James Tolkan, Kitty Winn, Sudie Bond, Staats Cotsworth, F. Murray Abraham, Paul Benedict, M. Emmet Walsh, Louis Zorich, Ted Beniades, Worthington Miner, Frances Fuller, Candice Azzara, Matthew Cowles	
J U N E	13	Drive, He Said	Columbia Pictures / BBS Productions / Drive Productions Inc.	Jack Nicholson (director/screenplay); Jeremy Larner (screenplay); William Tepper, Karen Black, Michael Margotta, Bruce Dern, Robert Towne, Henry Jaglom, Michael Warren, June Fairchild, Don Hanmer, Charles Robinson, David Ogden Stiers, Cindy Williams, Lynne Marie Stewart, Lynette Bernay, Joseph Walsh, Harry Gittes, Bill Sweek, B.J. Merholz, I.J. Jefferson, Kenneth Payne, Cathy Bradford, Eric Johnson	
J U N E	13	Wuthering Heights	American International Pictures	Robert Fuest (director); Patrick Tilley (screenplay); Anna Calder-Marshall, Timothy Dalton, Harry Andrews, Pamela Brown, Judy Cornwell, James Cossins, Rosalie Crutchley, Hilary Dwyer, Julian Glover, Hugh Griffith, Morag Hood, Ian Ogilvy, Peter Sallis, Aubrey Woods, Wendy Allnutt, John Comer, Dudley Foster, Gordon Gostelow, Keith Buckley, Sandra Bryant, Gertan Klauber	
J U N E	15	Fortune and Men's Eyes	Metro-Goldwyn-Mayer	Harvey Hart (director); John Herbert (screenplay); Wendell Burton, Michael Greer, Danny Freedman, Hugh Webster, Zooey Hall, Larry Perkins, James Barron, Tom Harvey, Jan Granik, Kirk McColl, Vance Davis, Robert Goodier, Lázaro Pérez	
J U N E	15	Who Is Harry Kellerman and Why Is He Saying Those Terrible Things About Me?	National General Pictures / Cinema Center Films	Ulu Grosbard (director/screenplay); Herb Gardner (screenplay); Dustin Hoffman, Barbara Harris, Jack Warden, David Burns, Dom DeLuise, Gabriel Dell, Betty Walker, Rose Gregorio	
J U N E	17	The Anderson Tapes	Columbia Pictures / Robert M. Weitman Productions	Sidney Lumet (director); Frank Pierson (screenplay); Sean Connery, Dyan Cannon, Martin Balsam, Ralph Meeker, Alan King, Dick Anthony Williams, Val Avery, Garrett Morris, Stan Gottlieb, Christopher Walken, Conrad Bain, Margaret Hamilton, Anthony Holland, Scott Jacoby, Judith Lowry, Meg Myles, Norman Rose, Max Showalter	
J U N E	18	Willard	Cinerama Releasing Corporation / Bing Crosby Productions	Daniel Mann (director); Gilbert Ralston (screenplay); Bruce Davison, Sondra Locke, Elsa Lanchester, Ernest Borgnine, Michael Dante, Jody Gilbert, William Hansen, John Myhers, J. Pat O'Malley, Joan Shawlee, Almira Sessions, Alan Baxter, Minta Durfee, Pauline Drake, Helen Spring, Sherry Presnell	
J U N E	18	The Panic in Needle Park	20th Century Fox / Gadd Productions Corp. / Didion-Dunne	Jerry Schatzberg (director); Joan Didion, John Gregory Dunne (screenplay); Al Pacino, Kitty Winn, Alan Vint, Richard Bright, Kiel Martin, Warren Finnerty, Marcia Jean Kurtz, Raúl Juliá, Gil Rogers, Joe Santos, Paul Sorvino, Sully Boyar, Ruth Alda, Anthony Palmer, Michael McClanathan, Angie Ortega, Larry Marshall, Paul Mace, Nancy MacKay, Arnold Williams	
J U N E	22	Scandalous John	Walt Disney Productions / Buena Vista Distribution	Robert Butler (director); Bill Walsh (screenplay); Brian Keith, Alfonso Arau, Michele Carey, Rick Lenz, Harry Morgan, Simon Oakland, Bill Williams	
J U N E	23	Le Mans	National General Pictures / Cinema Center Films	Lee H. Katzin (director); Harry Kleiner (screenplay); Steve McQueen, Siegfried Rauch, Elga Andersen, Ronald Leigh-Hunt, Luc Merenda, Louise Edlind, Angelo Infanti, Carlo Cecchi, Fred Haltiner, Christopher Waite, Jean-Claude Bercq, Michele Scalera, Gino Cassani, Alfred Bell	
J U N E	23	Man and Boy	Columbia Pictures / J. Cornelius Crean Films Inc. / Jemmin Inc.	E. W. Swackhamer (director); Harry Essex, Oscar Saul (screenplay); Bill Cosby, Gloria Foster, Leif Erickson, George Spell, Douglas Turner Ward, John Anderson, Henry Silva, Dub Taylor, Yaphet Kotto, Shelley Morrison, Richard Bull, Robert Lawson, Jason Clark, Fred Graham, Jack Owens	
J U N E	23	Wild Rovers	Metro-Goldwyn-Mayer / Geoffrey Productions	Blake Edwards (director/screenplay); William Holden, Ryan O'Neal, Karl Malden, Joe Don Baker, Tom Skerritt, James Olson, Lynn Carlin, Leora Dana, Victor French, Rachel Roberts, Moses Gunn, Sam Gilman, Charles Gray, Bill Bryant, Jack Garner, Mary Jackson, William Lucking, Ed Bakey, Ted Gehring, Alan Carney, Lee de Broux, Bennie Dobbins, Bruno VeSota, Dick Crockett, Phyllis Douglas, Ed Parker	
J U N E	24	McCabe & Mrs. Miller	Warner Bros.	Robert Altman (director/screenplay); Warren Beatty, Julie Christie, René Auberjonois, William Devane, John Schuck, Corey Fischer, Shelley Duvall, Bert Remsen, Keith Carradine, Michael Murphy, Antony Holland, Hugh Millais, Jack Riley	
J U N E	25	Klute	Warner Bros. / Gus Productions	Alan J. Pakula (director); Andy Lewis, Dave Lewis (screenplay); Jane Fonda, Donald Sutherland, Charles Cioffi, Roy Scheider, Dorothy Tristan, Rita Gam, Vivian Nathan, Nathan George, Jane White, Shirley Stoler, Robert Milli, Anthony Holland, Richard B. Shull, Mary Louise Wilson, Rosalind Cash, Jean Stapleton, Antonia Rey, Candy Darling, Kevin Dobson, Veronica Hamel, Richard Jordan, Harry Reems, Joe Silver, Lee Wallace, Sylvester Stallone	
J U N E	27	A Town Called Hell	Scotia International	Robert Parrish (director); Robert Shaw, Telly Savalas, Stella Stevens, Martin Landau, Fernando Rey, Al Lettieri, Michael Craig, Dudley Sutton, Paloma Cela, Aldo Sambrell, John Clark, Tito García	
J U N E	28	The Hellstrom Chronicle	Cinema 5 Distributing	Ed Spiegel, Walon Green (directors); David Seltzer (screenplay); Lawrence Pressman	
J U N E	30	Carnal Knowledge	AVCO Embassy Pictures	Mike Nichols (director); Jules Feiffer (screenplay); Jack Nicholson, Candice Bergen, Art Garfunkel, Ann-Margret, Rita Moreno, Carol Kane, Cynthia O'Neal	
J U N E	30	The Million Dollar Duck	Walt Disney Productions / Buena Vista Distribution	Vincent McEveety (director); Roswell Rogers (screenplay); Dean Jones, Sandy Duncan, Joe Flynn, Tony Roberts, James Gregory	
J U N E	30	My Old Man's Place	Cinerama Releasing Corporation / Philip A. Waxman Productions Inc.	Edwin Sherin (director); Stanford Whitmore (screenplay); Arthur Kennedy, Mitchell Ryan, William Devane, Michael Moriarty, Topo Swope, Lloyd Gough, Ford Rainey, Peter Donat, Sandra Vacey, Paula Kauffman, Eve Marchand, Bud Walls, Harvey Brumfield	
J U N E	30	What's the Matter with Helen?	United Artists / Filmways Pictures / Raymax Productions	Curtis Harrington (director); Henry Farrell (screenplay); Debbie Reynolds, Shelley Winters, Dennis Weaver, Micheál MacLiammóir, Agnes Moorehead, Robbi Morgan, Timothy Carey, Swen Swenson, James Dobson	
J U N E	30	Willy Wonka & the Chocolate Factory	Paramount Pictures / Wolper Pictures, Ltd. / The Quaker Oats Company	Mel Stuart (director); Roald Dahl (screenplay); Gene Wilder, Jack Albertson, Peter Ostrum, Roy Kinnear, Julie Dawn Cole, Leonard Stone, Denise Nickerson, Dodo Denney, Paris Themmen, Ursula Reit, Michael Böllner	

== July–September ==
Opening		Title	Production company	Cast and crew	Ref.
J U L Y	1	Murphy's War	Paramount Pictures / Hemdale / Michael Deeley-Peter Yates Films	Peter Yates (director); Stirling Silliphant (screenplay); Peter O'Toole, Siân Phillips, Philippe Noiret, Horst Janson, John Hallam, Ingo Mogendorf, Harry Fielder, George Roubicek	
J U L Y	1	Walkabout	20th Century Fox / Max L. Raab-Si Litvinoff Films	Nicolas Roeg (director); Edward Bond (screenplay); Jenny Agutter, Lucien John, David Gulpilil, John Meillon, Robert McDarra, Noeline Brown, Pete Carver, John Illingsworth, Hilary Bamberger, Barry Donnelly, Carlo Manchini	
J U L Y	1	Sunday Bloody Sunday	United Artists / Vectia	John Schlesinger (director); Penelope Gilliatt (screenplay); Glenda Jackson, Peter Finch, Murray Head, Peggy Ashcroft, Tony Britton, Maurice Denham, Bessie Love, Vivian Pickles, Frank Windsor, Thomas Baptiste, Richard Pearson	
J U L Y	2	Shaft	Metro-Goldwyn-Mayer / Shaft Productions	Gordon Parks (director); Ernest Tidyman, John D. F. Black (screenplay); Richard Roundtree, Moses Gunn, Drew Bundini Brown, Charles Cioffi, Christopher St. John, Lawrence Pressman, Victor Arnold, Tony King, Rex Robbins, Camille Yarbrough, Arnold Johnson, Antonio Fargas, Gwenn Mitchell, Sherri Brewer, Margaret Warncke, Joseph Leon	
J U L Y	7	Two-Lane Blacktop	Universal Pictures / Michael Laughlin Enterprises	Monte Hellman (director); Rudolph Wurlitzer, Will Corry (screenplay); James Taylor, Warren Oates, Laurie Bird, Dennis Wilson, Rudolph Wurlitzer, Harry Dean Stanton, Alan Vint, George Mitchell, Katherine Squire, James Mitchum, Bill Keller, Don Samuels, Charles Moore, A.J. Solari, Melissa Hellman, Kreag Caffey	
J U L Y	15	Vampyros Lesbos	Fénix Films / CCC Telecine Film	Jesús Franco (director/screenplay); Jaime Chávarri (screenplay); Soledad Miranda, Ewa Strömberg, Dennis Price, Paul Müller, Jesús Franco, Andrea Montchal, Heidrun Kussin, Michael Berling, Beni Cardoso, José Martínez Blanco	
J U L Y	16	The Devils	Warner Bros. / Russo Productions	Ken Russell (director/screenplay); Vanessa Redgrave, Oliver Reed, Dudley Sutton, Max Adrian, Gemma Jones, Murray Melvin, Michael Gothard, Georgina Hale, Brian Murphy, John Woodvine, Christopher Logue, Kenneth Colley, Graham Armitage, Andrew Faulds, Judith Paris, Catherine Willmer	
J U L Y	16	The Hunting Party	United Artists / Levy-Gardner-Laven	Don Medford (director); Gilbert Ralston, William W. Norton, Lou Morheim (screenplay); Oliver Reed, Gene Hackman, Candice Bergen, Simon Oakland, L. Q. Jones, Mitchell Ryan, Ronald Howard, William Watson, G. D. Spradlin, Rayford Barnes, Bernard Kay, Francesca Tu, Richard Adams, Dean Selmier, Sarah Atkinson	
J U L Y	16	The Light at the Edge of the World	National General Pictures / The Bryna Company	Kevin Billington (director); Tom Rowe, Rachel Billington (screenplay); Kirk Douglas, Yul Brynner, Samantha Eggar, Jean-Claude Drouot, Fernando Rey, Renato Salvatori, Massimo Ranieri, Aldo Sambrell, Tito García, Victor Israel	
J U L Y	17	Gamera vs. Zigra (Japan)	Dainichi Eihai / Daiei Film	Noriaki Yuasa (director); Niisan Takahashi (screenplay); Eiko Yanami, Keiichi Noda, Reiko Kasahara, Mikiko Tsubouchi, Kōji Fujiyama, Isamu Saeki, Yasushi Sakagami, Arlene Zoellner, Gloria Zoellner, Shin Minatsu, Umenosuke Izumi	
J U L Y	21	Murders in the Rue Morgue	American International Pictures	Gordon Hessler (director); Christopher Wicking, Henry Slesar (screenplay); Jason Robards, Herbert Lom, Christine Kaufmann, Adolfo Celi, Maria Perschy, Michael Dunn, Lilli Palmer, Peter Arne, María Martín, Rafael Hernández, Rosalind Elliot, Marshall Jones, Ruth Plattes	
J U L Y	23	The Seven Minutes	20th Century Fox	Russ Meyer (director); Richard Warren Lewis (screenplay); Wayne Maunder, Marianne McAndrew, Philip Carey, Jay C. Flippen, Edy Williams, Lyle Bettger, Yvonne De Carlo, Jackie Gayle, Ron Randell, Charles Drake, John Carradine, Harold J. Stone, James Iglehart, Tom Selleck, Olan Soule, David Brian, Charles Napier, Wolfman Jack, Lynn Hamilton, John Sarno, Jan Shutan	
J U L Y	24	Godzilla vs. Hedorah (Godzilla vs. the Smog Monster) (Japan)	Toho	Yoshimitsu Banno (director/screenplay); Takeshi Kimura (screenplay); Haruo Nakajima, Kenpachiro Satsuma, Akira Yamanouchi, Hiroyuki Kawase, Toshie Kimura, Keiko Mari, Toshio Shiba, Yoshio Yoshida	
J U L Y	24	The Horsemen	Columbia Pictures	John Frankenheimer (director); Dalton Trumbo (screenplay); Omar Sharif, Jack Palance, Leigh Taylor-Young, Peter Jeffrey, George Murcell, Eric Pohlmann, Vernon Dobtcheff, Saeed Jaffrey, John Ruddock, Leon Lissek, Ishaq Bux, Carlos Casaravilla, David de Keyser, Despo Diamantidou, Ricardo Palacios, Milton Reid, Jesús Tordesillas, Tom Tryon, Alan Webb, Srinanda De, Mark Colleano, Salmaan Peerzada, Aziz Resham, Vida St. Romaine	
J U L Y	28	On Any Sunday	Cinema 5	Bruce Brown (director); Bruce Brown, Steve McQueen, Mert Lawwill, Malcolm Smith, Paul Carruthers	
J U L Y	28	Von Richthofen and Brown	United Artists / The Corman Company	Roger Corman (director); John William Corrington, Joyce Hooper Corrington (screenplay); John Phillip Law, Don Stroud, Barry Primus, Corin Redgrave, Hurd Hatfield, Stephen McHattie, Robert La Tourneaux, Peter Masterson, Clint Kimbrough, David Weston, Tom Adams, Maureen Cusack, Ferdy Mayne, George Armitage, Shane Briant, Julie Corman, Karen Huston, Brian Foley, Seamus Forde	
J U L Y	29	The Go-Between	MGM-EMI Film Distributors / EMI Films	Joseph Losey (director); Harold Pinter (screenplay); Julie Christie, Edward Fox, Alan Bates, Margaret Leighton, Michael Redgrave, Dominic Guard, Michael Gough, Richard Gibson, Simon Hume-Kendall, Roger Lloyd-Pack, Amaryllis Garnett	
J U L Y	30	Bless the Beasts and Children	Columbia Pictures	Stanley Kramer (director); Mac Benoff (screenplay); Bill Mumy, Barry Robins, Miles Chapin, Jesse White, Ken Swofford, Elaine Devry, David Ketchum, Bruce Glover, Vanessa Brown, William Bramley, Darel Glaser, Bob Kramer, Marc Vahanian, Wayne Sutherlin	
A U G U S T	1	Doc	United Artists / FP Films	Frank Perry (director); Pete Hamill (screenplay); Stacy Keach, Faye Dunaway, Harris Yulin, Michael Witney, Dan Greenburg, Richard McKenzie, Penelope Allen, James Greene, Antonia Rey, Denver John Collins, John Scanlon, John Bottoms, Ferdinand Zogbaum, Hedy Sontag, Philip Shafer, Fred Dennis	
A U G U S T	1	The Omega Man	Warner Bros. / Walter Seltzer Productions	Boris Sagal (director); John William Corrington, Joyce Hooper Corrington (screenplay); Charlton Heston, Anthony Zerbe, Rosalind Cash, Paul Koslo, Eric Laneuville, Lincoln Kilpatrick, Brian Tochi, DeVeren Bookwalter, John Dierkes, Linda Redfearn, Henry Kingi	
A U G U S T	5	The Love Machine	Columbia Pictures / Sujac Productions / Frankovich Productions	Jack Haley Jr. (director); Samuel Taylor (screenplay); John Phillip Law, Dyan Cannon, Robert Ryan, Jackie Cooper, David Hemmings, Jodi Wexler, William Roerick, Maureen Arthur, Shecky Greene, Clinton Greyn	
A U G U S T	9	The Mephisto Waltz	20th Century Fox	Paul Wendkos (director); Ben Maddow (screenplay); Alan Alda, Jacqueline Bisset, Barbara Parkins, Bradford Dillman, William Windom, Kathleen Widdoes, Pamelyn Ferdin, Curd Jürgens, Curt Lowens, Lilyan Chauvin, Khigh Dhiegh, Alberto Morin, Berry Kroeger	
A U G U S T	11	The Hired Hand	Universal Pictures / The Pando Company	Peter Fonda (director); Alan Sharp (screenplay); Peter Fonda, Warren Oates, Verna Bloom, Severn Darden, Ann Doran, Ted Markland, Michael McClure, Robert Pratt, Rita Rogers, Owen Orr, Al Hopson, Megan Denver, Gray Johnson	
A U G U S T	13	Die Screaming, Marianne (U.K.)	Pete Walker Film Productions	Pete Walker (director); Murray Smith (screenplay); Susan George, Barry Evans, Chris Sandford, Judy Huxtable, Leo Genn, Kenneth Hendel, Paul Stassino, Alan Curtis, Anthony Sharp, Jon Laurimore, Martin Wyldeck	
A U G U S T	17	Cry Uncle!	Troma Entertainment	John G. Avildsen (director/screenplay); David Odell, Allen Garfield (screenplay); Allen Garfield, Debbi Morgan, Paul Sorvino, Ray Barron, Mel Stewart, Jackson Beck, Lloyd Kaufman, Madeleine Le Roux, Devin Goldenberg, David Kirk, Pamela Gruen, Sean Walsh, Maureen Byrnes, Nancy Salmon, Bruce Pecheur	
A U G U S T	18	Fools' Parade	Columbia Pictures / Stanmore Productions / Penbar Productions, Inc.	Andrew V. McLaglen (director); James Lee Barrett (screenplay); James Stewart, George Kennedy, Anne Baxter, Strother Martin, Kurt Russell, William Windom, Mike Kellin, Katherine Cannon, Morgan Paull, Robert Donner, David Huddleston, James Lee Barrett, Dort Clark, Kitty Jefferson Doepken	
A U G U S T	19	Clay Pigeon	Metro-Goldwyn-Mayer / Tracom	Lane Slate, Tom Stern (directors); Ronald Buck, Jack Gross Jr., Buddy Ruskin (screenplay); Tom Stern, Telly Savalas, Robert Vaughn, John Marley, Burgess Meredith, Ivan Dixon, Jeff Corey, Marilyn Akin, Marlene Clark, Belinda Palmer, Mario Alcalde, Peter Lawford	
A U G U S T	19	The Marriage of a Young Stockbroker	20th Century Fox	Lawrence Turman (director); Lorenzo Semple Jr. (screenplay); Richard Benjamin, Joanna Shimkus, Elizabeth Ashley, Adam West, Patricia Barry, Tiffany Bolling, Ed Prentiss, William Forrest, Alma Beltran, Norman Leavitt, Ron Masak, Bob Hastings, Johnny Scott Lee, Bill McConnell	
A U G U S T	25	A Gunfight	Paramount Pictures / Joel Productions / Harvest Productions / Thoroughbred Productions	Lamont Johnson (director); Harold Jack Bloom (screenplay); Kirk Douglas, Johnny Cash, Jane Alexander, Karen Black, Keith Carradine, Dana Elcar, Raf Vallone, Eric Douglas, Robert J. Wilke, Paul Lambert	
A U G U S T	27	Let's Scare Jessica to Death	Paramount Pictures / The Jessica Company	John Hancock (director/screenplay); Lee Kalcheim (screenplay); Zohra Lampert, Barton Heyman, Kevin O'Connor, Gretchen Corbett, Alan Manson, Mariclare Costello	
S E P T E M B E R	1	Beware of a Holy Whore (West Germany)	New Yorker Films	Rainer Werner Fassbinder (director/screenplay); Lou Castel, Eddie Constantine, Marquard Bohm, Hanna Schygulla, Rainer Werner Fassbinder, Margarethe von Trotta, Marcella Michelangeli, Ulli Lommel, Werner Schroeter, Kurt Raab, Hannes Fuchs, Karl Scheydt, Monica Teuber, Magdalena Montezuma	
S E P T E M B E R	2	See No Evil	Columbia Pictures / Filmways	Richard Fleischer (director); Brian Clemens (screenplay); Mia Farrow, Dorothy Alison, Robin Bailey, Diane Grayson, Brian Rawlinson, Norman Eshley, Paul Nicholas, Michael Elphick	
S E P T E M B E R	3	Return of Sabata	United Artists / Produzioni Europee Associati / Les Productions Artistes Associés / Artemis Filmgesellschaft	Gianfranco Parolini (director/screenplay); Renato Izzo (screenplay); Lee Van Cleef, Reiner Schöne, Giampiero Albertini, Ignazio Spalla, Annabella Incontrera, Jacqueline Alexandre, Vassili Karis, Aldo Canti, Gianni Rizzo, Steffen Zacharias, Pia Giancaro, John Bartha, Günther Stoll, Carmelo Reale, Franco Fantasia	
S E P T E M B E R	15	Red Sun	Les Films Corona / Oceana Produzioni Internazionali Cinematografiche / Producciones Balcázar S.A.	Terence Young (director); Denne Bart Petitclerc, William Roberts, Lawrence Roman (screenplay); Charles Bronson, Ursula Andress, Toshirō Mifune, Alain Delon, Capucine, Barta Barri, Lee Burton	
S E P T E M B E R	15	Been Down So Long It Looks Like Up to Me	Paramount Pictures	Jeffrey Young (director); Robert Schlitt (screenplay); Barry Primus, David Downing, Susan Tyrrell, Philip Shafer, Bruce Davison, Zack Norman, Raúl Juliá, Murray the K, Guy Deghy, The Five Satins, Paul Jabara, Calvin Jung, James Noble, John P. Ryan, Karel Stepanek, John Collin, Linda De Coff, Nick Hammond, Cynthia Harris, Shi Khanma	
S E P T E M B E R	17	Kotch	Cinerama Releasing Corporation / ABC Pictures	Jack Lemmon (director); John Paxton (screenplay); Walter Matthau, Deborah Winters, Felicia Farr, Charles Aidman, Ellen Geer, Jane Connell, Darrell Larson, Biff Elliot, Paul Picerni, Lucy Saroyan, Kim Hamilton, Amzie Strickland, Larry Linville, Penny Santon, Jack Lemmon, Donald and Dean Kowalski, Arlen Stuart, James E. Brodhead, Jessica Rains	
S E P T E M B E R	20	Dracula vs. Frankenstein	Independent-International Pictures	Al Adamson (director); William Pugsley, Samuel M. Sherman (screenplay); J. Carrol Naish, Lon Chaney Jr., Anthony Eisley, John Bloom, Jim Davis, Regina Carrol, Russ Tamblyn, Angelo Rossitto, Forrest J. Ackerman, Greydon Clark, Zandor Vorkov, Anne Morrell, Maria Lease, Shelley Weiss	
S E P T E M B E R	22	Desperate Characters	Paramount Pictures / ITC Entertainment	Frank D. Gilroy (director/screenplay); Paula Fox (screenplay); Shirley MacLaine, Kenneth Mars, Sada Thompson, Jack Somack, Gerald S. O'Loughlin, Carol Kane, Michael Higgins, Rose Gregorio, Shauneille Perry, Robert Bauer, Patrick McVey, Chris Gampel, Mary Alan Hokanson, L.J. Davis	
S E P T E M B E R	23	Unman, Wittering and Zigo	Paramount Pictures / Hemmings / Mediaarts	John Mackenzie (director); Simon Raven (screenplay); David Hemmings, Douglas Wilmer, Carolyn Seymour, Hamilton Dyce, Tony Haygarth, Barbara Lott, David Jackson, Hubert Rees, David Auker	
S E P T E M B E R	24	The Last Rebel	Columbia Pictures / Glendenning / Orten / Spangler / U.S. Captail	Denys McCoy (director); Lorenzo Sabatini, Red Redifer (screenplay); Joe Namath, Jack Elam, Woody Strode, Ty Hardin, Mike Forrest, Jessica Dublin, Larry Laurence, Victoria George, Renato Romano, Marina Coffa, Annamaria Chio, Bruce Eweka, Al Hassan	
S E P T E M B E R	24	The Trojan Women	Cinerama Releasing Corporation / Josef Shaftel Productions Inc.	Michael Cacoyannis (director/screenplay); Euripides, Edith Hamilton (screenplay); Katharine Hepburn, Vanessa Redgrave, Geneviève Bujold, Irene Papas, Brian Blessed, Patrick Magee, Rosalind Shanks, Alberto Sanz	
S E P T E M B E R	25	Tiki Tiki	Potterton Productions	Gerald Potterton (director/screenplay); Jerome Chodorov, Donald Brittain (screenplay); Peter Cullen, Jean Shepherd, Ted Zeigler, Barry Baldaro, Gayle Claitman, Patrick Conlon, Joan Stuart	
S E P T E M B E R	28	And Now for Something Completely Different	Columbia-Warner Distributors / Playboy Productions / Kettledrum Films / Lownes Productions / Python (Monty) Pictures	Ian MacNaughton, Terry Gilliam (directors); Monty Python (screenplay); Graham Chapman, John Cleese, Terry Gilliam, Eric Idle, Terry Jones, Michael Palin	
S E P T E M B E R	28	The Last Movie	Universal Pictures / Alta-Light	Dennis Hopper (director); Stewart Stern (screenplay); Dennis Hopper, Stella Garcia, Don Gordon, Julie Adams, Peter Fonda, Sylvia Miles, Samuel Fuller, Dean Stockwell, Russ Tamblyn, Tomas Milian, Toni Basil, Severn Darden, Roy Engel, Henry Jaglom	
S E P T E M B E R	30	The Skin Game	Warner Bros.	Paul Bogart (director); Richard Alan Simmons, Pierre Marton (screenplay); James Garner, Lou Gossett, Susan Clark, Brenda Sykes, Edward Asner, Andrew Duggan, Henry Jones, Neva Patterson, Parley Baer, George Tyne, Royal Dano, J. Pat O'Malley, Joel Fluellen, Napoleon Whiting, Juanita Moore, Robert Foulk	

== October–December ==
Opening		Title	Production company	Cast and crew	Ref.
O C T O B E R	6	Zeppelin	Warner Bros.	Etienne Périer (director); Donald Churchill, Arthur Rowe (screenplay); Michael York, Elke Sommer, Peter Carsten, Marius Goring, Anton Diffring, Andrew Keir, Rupert Davies, Alexandra Stewart, William Marlowe, Richard Hurndall, Michael Robbins, George Mikell	
O C T O B E R	9	The French Connection	20th Century Fox	William Friedkin (director); Ernest Tidyman (screenplay); Gene Hackman, Fernando Rey, Roy Scheider, Tony Lo Bianco, Marcel Bozzuffi, Frédéric de Pasquale, Bill Hickman, Eddie Egan, André Ernotte, Sonny Grosso, Randy Jurgensen, Ann Rebbot, Harold Gary, Arlene Farber, Alan Weeks	
O C T O B E R	13	Shoot Out	Universal Pictures / Hal Wallis Productions	Henry Hathaway (director); Marguerite Roberts (screenplay); Gregory Peck, Pat Quinn, Robert F. Lyons, Susan Tyrrell, Jeff Corey, James Gregory, Rita Gam, Dawn Lyn, Pepe Serna, John Chandler	
O C T O B E R	15	A Safe Place	Columbia Pictures / BBS Productions	Henry Jaglom (director/screenplay); Tuesday Weld, Orson Welles, Jack Nicholson, Philip Proctor, Gwen Welles, Roger Garrett, Francesca Hilton, Richard Finocchio	
O C T O B E R	18	Bunny O'Hare	American International Pictures	Gerd Oswald (director); Stanley Z. Cherry, Coslough Johnson (screenplay); Bette Davis, Ernest Borgnine, Jack Cassidy, Jay Robinson, Joan Delaney, John Astin, Reva Rose, Robert Foulk, Bruno VeSota, Larry Linville, Tony Genaro, Buck Kartalian	
O C T O B E R	20	Catlow	Metro-Goldwyn-Mayer	Sam Wanamaker (director); Scott Finch, J.J. Griffith (screenplay); Yul Brynner, Richard Crenna, Leonard Nimoy, Daliah Lavi, Jo Ann Pflug, Jeff Corey, Michael Delano, Julián Mateos, David Ladd, Bob Logan, John Clark, Dan van Husen, Bessie Love, José Nieto, Angel del Pozo, Victor Israel, Tito Garcia, Walter Coy	
O C T O B E R	20	The Organization	United Artists / The Mirisch Corporation	Don Medford (director); James R. Webb (screenplay); Sidney Poitier, Barbara McNair, Gerald S. O'Loughlin, Sheree North, Fred Beir, Allen Garfield, Graham Jarvis, Raúl Juliá, James A. Watson Jr., Ron O'Neal, Bernie Hamilton, Charles H. Gray	
O C T O B E R	20	Play Misty for Me	Universal Pictures / The Malpaso Company	Clint Eastwood (director); Jo Heims, Dean Riesner (screenplay); Clint Eastwood, Jessica Walter, Donna Mills, John Larch, Jack Ging, Irene Hervey, James McEachin, Clarice Taylor, Donald Siegel, Johnny Otis, Joe Zawinul, Cannonball Adderley, Duke Everts, Britt Lind, Jack Kosslyn	
O C T O B E R	20	The Todd Killings	National General Pictures	Barry Shear (director); Dennis Murphy, Joel Oliansky (screenplay); Robert F. Lyons, Richard Thomas, Belinda Montgomery, Barbara Bel Geddes, James Broderick, Gloria Grahame, Harry Lauter, Holly Near, Ed Asner, Fay Spain, Michael Conrad	
O C T O B E R	20	T.R. Baskin	Paramount Pictures	Herbert Ross (director); Peter Hyams (screenplay); Candice Bergen, Peter Boyle, James Caan, Marcia Rodd, Howard Platt, Mike Nussbaum	
O C T O B E R	22	The Last Picture Show	Columbia Pictures / BBS Productions	Peter Bogdanovich (director/screenplay); Larry McMurtry (screenplay); Timothy Bottoms, Jeff Bridges, Cybill Shepherd, Ben Johnson, Cloris Leachman, Ellen Burstyn, Eileen Brennan, Clu Gulager, Sam Bottoms, Randy Quaid, Gary Brockette, Bill Thurman, John Hillerman, Noble Willingham, Frank Marshall, Sharon Taggart, Barc Doyle, Jessie Lee Fulton, Robert Glenn, Joe Heathcock	
O C T O B E R	23	The Big Boss (Hong Kong)	Golden Harvest	Lo Wei, Wu Chia Hsiang (directors); Bruce Lee, Maria Yi, James Tien, Nora Miao, Lee Quinn, Rhoma Irama, Han Ying-chieh, Lau Wing, Billy Chan Wui-ngai, Lam Ching-ying, Kam San, Ricky Chik, Li Hua Sze, Marilyn Bautista, Chan Chue, Chom, Tu Chia-Cheng, Peter Chan Lung	
O C T O B E R	24	Joe Hill	Paramount Pictures	Bo Widerberg (director/screenplay); Thommy Berggren, Liska March, Anja Schmidt, Kelvin Malave, Evert Anderson, Cathy Smith, Hasse Persson, David Moritz, Richard Weber, Joel Miller, Franco Molinari, Robert Faeder, Wendy Geier, Michael Logan	
O C T O B E R	25	Bleak Moments	Contemporary Films	Mike Leigh (director/screenplay); Anne Raitt, Sarah Stephenson, Eric Allan, Joolia Cappleman, Mike Bradwell, Donald Sumpter, Liz Smith	
O C T O B E R	27	Captain Apache	Scotia International	Alexander Singer (director); Milton Sperling, Philip Yordan (screenplay); Lee Van Cleef, Carroll Baker, Stuart Whitman, Percy Herbert, Elisa Montés, Tony Vogel, Dee Pollock, Dan van Husen, Hugh McDermott, José Bódalo, Ricardo Palacios, Milo Quesada, Bruce M. Fischer, Fernando Sánchez Polack, Luis Induni, Robert Rietty, Jess Hahn, Charly Bravo, Charles Stal Maker, Faith Clift, Elsa Zabala	
O C T O B E R	29	200 Motels	United Artists / Murakami-Wolf-Swenson / Bizarre Productions	Frank Zappa, Tony Palmer (directors); Frank Zappa, The Mothers of Invention, Theodore Bikel, Ringo Starr, Keith Moon, Howard Kaylan, Mark Volman, Ian Underwood, Ruth Underwood, Don Preston, Jimmy Carl Black, Euclid James 'Motorhead' Sherwood, Aynsley Dunbar, George Duke, Jim Pons, Pamela Des Barres, Lucy Offerall, Royal Philharmonic Orchestra, Martin Lickert, Janet Neville-Ferguson, Dick Barber, Judy Gridley	
O C T O B E R	29	Duck, You Sucker!	United Artists	Sergio Leone (director/screenplay); Luciano Vincenzoni, Sergio Donati (screenplay); Rod Steiger, James Coburn, Romolo Valli, Maria Monti, Rik Battaglia, Franco Graziosi, Antoine Saint-John, Vivienne Chandler, David Warbeck, Giulio Battiferri, Furio Meniconi, Benito Stefanelli, Antonio Casale, Riccardo Pizzuti, Aldo Sambrell	
N O V E M B E R	1	I, Monster	British Lion Films / Amicus Productions	Stephen Weeks (director); Milton Subotsky (screenplay); Christopher Lee, Peter Cushing, Mike Raven, Richard Hurndall, George Merritt, Kenneth J. Warren, Susan Jameson, Marjie Lawrence, Aimée Delamain, Michael Des Barres, Chloe Franks, Ian McCulloch, Fred Wood	
N O V E M B E R	3	Fiddler on the Roof	United Artists / The Mirisch Company / Cartier Productions	Norman Jewison (director); Joseph Stein (screenplay); Topol, Norma Crane, Rosalind Harris, Michele Marsh	
N O V E M B E R	5	Black Noon	CBS / Andrew J. Fenady Productions / Screen Gems Television	Bernard L. Kowalski (director); Andrew J. Fenady (screenplay); Roy Thinnes, Yvette Mimieux, Ray Milland, Gloria Grahame, Lynn Loring, Henry Silva, Hank Worden, William Bryant, Stan Barrett, Joshua Bryant, Leif Garrett, Buddy Foster	
N O V E M B E R	8	Hannie Caulder	Paramount Pictures / Tigon British Film Productions / Curtwel Productions	Burt Kennedy (director); Z.X. Jones (screenplay); Raquel Welch, Robert Culp, Ernest Borgnine, Jack Elam, Strother Martin, Christopher Lee, Diana Dors, Brian Lightburn, Luis Barboo, Stephen Boyd, Paco de Lucía, Aldo Sambrell	
N O V E M B E R	10	Jennifer on My Mind	United Artists / Bernard Schwartz Productions / Joseph M. Schenck Productions	Noel Black (director); Erich Segal (screenplay); Michael Brandon, Tippy Walker, Steve Vinovich, Chuck McCann, Peter Bonerz, Renée Taylor, Robert De Niro, Allan F. Nicholls, Barry Bostwick, Jeff Conaway, Lou Gilbert, Bruce Kornbluth	
N O V E M B E R	12	Mon oncle Antoine	Janus Films / National Film Board of Canada	Claude Jutra (director/screenplay); Clément Perron (screenplay); Jacques Gagnon, Lyne Champagne, Jean Duceppe, Olivette Thibault, Claude Jutra, Lionel Villeneuve, Hélène Loiselle, Mario Dubuc, Lise Brunelle, Alain Legendre, Robin Marcoux, Serge Evers, Monique Mercure, Georges Alexander, Rene Salvatore Catta	
N O V E M B E R	12	Who Killed Mary What's 'Er Name?	Cannon Film Distributors	Ernest Pintoff (director); John O'Toole (screenplay); Red Buttons, Sylvia Miles, Alice Playten, Conrad Bain, Dick Anthony Williams, Sam Waterston, David Doyle, Gilbert Lewis, Earl Hindman, Ron Carey, Norman Rose, Antonia Rey, Jake LaMotta	
N O V E M B E R	13	Duel (First US Television Broadcast)	ABC / Universal Television	Steven Spielberg (director); Richard Matheson (screenplay); Dennis Weaver, Jacqueline Scott, Carey Loftin, Eddie Firestone, Lou Frizzell, Eugene Dynarski, Lucille Benson, Tim Herbert, Charles Seel, Shirley O'Hara, Alexander Lockwood, Amy Douglass, Sweet Dick Whittington, Dale Van Sickel	
N O V E M B E R	18	The Christian Licorice Store	National General Pictures / Cinema Center Films	James Frawley (director); Floyd Mutrux (screenplay); Beau Bridges, Maud Adams, Gilbert Roland, Allan Arbus, Anne Randall, Monte Hellman, Butch Buchholz, Jean Renoir, Walter Barnes, McLean Stevenson, Howard Storm, Greg Mullavey, Larry Gelman, Barbara Leigh, James Jeter, Lawrence Gordon, Mike Medavoy, James B. Harris, Howard Hesseman, Gwen Welles, Indus Arthur, Talia Shire	
N O V E M B E R	24	Black Beauty	Paramount Pictures / Tigon British Film Productions	James Hill (director/screenplay); Wolf Mankowitz (screenplay); Mark Lester, Walter Slezak, Uschi Glas, Peter Lee Lawrence, Patrick Mower, John Nettleton, Maria Rohm, Margaret Lacey, Eddie Golden, Clive Geraghty, John Hoey, Patrick Gardiner, Brian McGrath	
N O V E M B E R	24	Man in the Wilderness	Warner Bros. / Limbridge Wilderness Films	Richard C. Sarafian (director); Jack DeWitt (screenplay); Richard Harris, John Huston, Henry Wilcoxon, Prunella Ransome, Percy Herbert, Dennis Waterman, Norman Rossington, James Doohan, Bryan Marshall, Ben Carruthers, John Bindon, Robert Russell, Bruce M. Fischer, Sheila Raynor, Judith Furse	
N O V E M B E R	30	Bleak Moments	Contemporary Films	Mike Leigh (director/screenplay); Anne Raitt, Sarah Stephenson, Eric Allan, Joolia Cappleman, Mike Bradwell, Donald Sumpter, Liz Smith	
N O V E M B E R	30	Brian's Song	ABC / Screen Gems	Buzz Kulik (director); William Blinn (screenplay); James Caan, Billy Dee Williams, Jack Warden, Shelley Fabares, Judy Pace, Bernie Casey, David Huddleston, Ron Feinberg, Jack Concannon, Abe Gibron, Ed O'Bradovich, Dick Butkus, Chicago Bears, Harold Hairston, Ji-Tu Cumbuka, Stu Nahan, Mario Machado, Mike Ditka	
N O V E M B E R	30	The Day of the Wolves	Gold Key Entertainment	Ferde Grofe Jr. (director/screenplay); Richard Egan, Martha Hyer, Rick Jason, Jan Murray, Frankie Randall, Zaldy Zshornack, Sean McClory, John Lupton, Jack Bailey, Biff Elliot, Percy Helton, Herb Vigran, Floyd Hamilton, Andre Marquis, Henry Capps, Smokey Roberds, John Braatz, Mel Scarborough, Elizabeth Thomas, Steve Manone, John Dennis, John Gunn, Len Travis, Wendy Alvord, Danny Rees	
D E C E M B E R	1	Born to Win	United Artists	Ivan Passer (director/screenplay); George Segal, Paula Prentiss, Karen Black, Héctor Elizondo, Robert De Niro, Marcia Jean Kurtz, Burt Young, Jose Perez, Sylvia Syms, Paul Benjamin, Jay Fletcher, Ed Madsen, Irving Selbst	
D E C E M B E R	1	Chandler	Metro-Goldwyn-Mayer	Paul Magwood (director); John Sacret Young (screenplay); Warren Oates, Leslie Caron, Alex Dreier, Marianne McAndrew, Mitchell Ryan, Gordon Pinsent, Charles McGraw, Walter Burke, Richard Loo, Gloria Grahame, Scatman Crothers, John Mitchum, Ray Kellogg	
D E C E M B E R	2	Family Life	Cinema 5 Distributing	Ken Loach (director); David Mercer (screenplay); Sandy Ratcliff, Malcolm Tierney, Bill Dean, Alan MacNaughtan, Johnny Gee, Grace Cave, Hilary Martin, Michael Riddall	
D E C E M B E R	8	Believe in Me	Metro-Goldwyn-Mayer	Stuart Hagmann (director); Israel Horovitz (screenplay); Michael Sarrazin, Jacqueline Bisset, Jon Cypher, Allen Garfield, Kurt Dodenhoff, Kevin Conway, Roger Robinson, Marcia Jean Kurtz, Antonio Fargas, Ultra Violet, Katherine Helmond	
D E C E M B E R	9	Gumshoe	Columbia-Warner Distributors	Stephen Frears (director); Neville Smith (screenplay); Albert Finney, Billie Whitelaw, Frank Finlay, Janice Rule, Carolyn Seymour, Fulton Mackay, Billy Dean, George Silver, George Innes, Neville Smith, Bert King, Ken Jones, Maureen Lipman, Wendy Richard, Oscar James, Tom Kempinski, Fred Wood	
D E C E M B E R	9	Happy Birthday, Wanda June	Columbia Pictures / Red Lion / Sourdough / The Filmakers Group	Mark Robson (director); Kurt Vonnegut (screenplay); Rod Steiger, Susannah York, George Grizzard, Don Murray, William Hickey, Steven Paul, Pamelyn Ferdin, Pamela Saunders, Louis Turenne	
D E C E M B E R	12	The Decameron	United Artists / Produzioni Europee Associate / Les Productions Artistes Associés / Artemis Films	Pier Paolo Pasolini (director/screenplay); Franco Citti, Ninetto Davoli, Angela Luce, Giuseppe Zigaina, Pier Paolo Pasolini, Giacomo Rizzo, Guido Alberti, Silvana Mangano, Gianni Rizzo, Monique van Vooren, Giani Esposito, Guido Mannari, Vincenzo Amato, Maria Gabriella Maione, Elisabetta Genovese, Giorgio Iovine, Lino Crispo, Vittorio Vittori, Vincenzo Ferrigno	
D E C E M B E R	12	Made for Each Other	20th Century Fox / Wylde Films	Robert B. Bean (director); Renée Taylor, Joseph Bologna (screenplay); Renée Taylor, Joseph Bologna, Paul Sorvino, Olympia Dukakis, Louis Zorich, Candice Azzara, Peggy Pope, Helen Verbit, Norman Shelly	
D E C E M B E R	13	Bedknobs and Broomsticks	Walt Disney Productions / Buena Vista Distribution	Robert Stevenson, Ward Kimball (directors); Bill Walsh, Don DaGradi (screenplay); Angela Lansbury, David Tomlinson, Ian Weighill, Cindy O'Callaghan, Roy Snart, Roddy McDowall, Sam Jaffe, John Ericson, Bruce Forsyth, Tessie O'Shea, Arthur Gould-Porter, Reginald Owen, Cyril Delevanti, John Orchard, Bob Holt, Lennie Weinrib, Dallas McKennon, Frank Baker, Don Barclay, Patrick Cranshaw, Anthony Eustrel, Morgan Farley, Arthur Malet, Clarence Nash, William H. O'Brien, Jack Raine, Arthur Space, John Steadman, Hank Worden	
D E C E M B E R	13	Nicholas and Alexandra	Columbia-Warner Distributors	Franklin J. Schaffner (director); James Goldman (screenplay); Michael Jayston, Janet Suzman, Laurence Olivier, Tom Baker, Harry Andrews, Irene Worth, Jack Hawkins, Roderic Noble, Ania Marson, Lynne Frederick, Candace Glendenning	
D E C E M B E R	14	The Hospital	United Artists	Arthur Hiller (director); Paddy Chayefsky (screenplay); George C. Scott, Diana Rigg, Robert Walden, Barnard Hughes, Richard Dysart, Stephen Elliott, Andrew Duncan, Donald Harron, Nancy Marchand, Jordan Charney, Roberts Blossom, Lenny Baker, Richard Hamilton	
D E C E M B E R	14	There's Always Vanilla	Cambist Films / The Latent Image	George A. Romero (director); Rudolph J. Ricci (screenplay); Robert Trow, Bill Hinzman, George Kosana, George A. Romero, John A. Russo, Russell Streiner, Raymond Laine, Judith Streiner, Johanna Lawrence, Richard Ricci, Roger McGovern, Ron Jaye, Louise Sahene, Christopher Priore, Bryson Randolph, Eleanor Schirra, Dorrit Chase, Elsie Doughty	
D E C E M B E R	16	The Boy Friend	MGM-EMI Film Distributors	Ken Russell (director/screenplay); Twiggy, Christopher Gable, Max Adrian, Bryan Pringle, Murray Melvin, Moyra Fraser, Georgina Hale, Vladek Sheybal, Tommy Tune, Brian Murphy, Graham Armitage, Barbara Windsor, Glenda Jackson, Sally Bryant, Antonia Ellis, Caryl Little, Anne Jameson, Catherine Willmer	
D E C E M B E R	17	$	Columbia Pictures / Frankovich Productions Inc.	Richard Brooks (director/screenplay); Warren Beatty, Goldie Hawn, Gert Fröbe, Robert Webber, Scott Brady, Arthur Brauss, Wolfgang Kieling, Christiane Maybach, Robert Stiles, Robert Herron, Hans Hutter, Monica Stender, Horst Hesslein, Wolfgang Kuhlman, Klaus Schichan	
D E C E M B E R	17	Lady and the Tramp (re-release)	Walt Disney Productions / Buena Vista Distribution	Clyde Geronimi, Wilfred Jackson, Hamilton Luske (directors); Erdman Penner, Joe Rinaldi, Ralph Wright, Don DaGradi, Joe Grant (screenplay); Barbara Luddy, Larry Roberts, Bill Thompson, Dallas McKennon, Bill Baucom, Verna Felton, George Givot, Lee Millar, Peggy Lee, Stan Freberg, Alan Reed, Thurl Ravenscroft, The Mellomen, Pinto Colvig, Taylor Holmes, Clarence Nash, Donald Novis	
D E C E M B E R	17	Mary, Queen of Scots	Universal Pictures	Charles Jarrott (director); John Hale (screenplay); Vanessa Redgrave, Glenda Jackson, Patrick McGoohan, Timothy Dalton, Nigel Davenport, Trevor Howard, Daniel Massey, Ian Holm, Andrew Keir, Tom Fleming, Robert James, Katherine Kath, Frances White, Vernon Dobtcheff, Raf De La Torre, Richard Warner, Bruce Purchase, Brian Coburn, Richard Denning, Maria Aitken, Jeremy Bulloch	
D E C E M B E R	17	Sometimes A Great Notion	Universal Pictures / Newman-Foreman Company	Paul Newman (director); John Gay (screenplay); Paul Newman, Henry Fonda, Lee Remick, Michael Sarrazin, Richard Jaeckel, Linda Lawson, Cliff Potts, Sam Gilman, Lee de Broux, Roy Jenson, Joe Maross, Charles Tyner, Bennie Dobbins, Mickey Gilbert, Gary McLarty, Hal Needham, J. N. Roberts, Charles Horvath, Melissa Newman	
D E C E M B E R	19	A Clockwork Orange	Warner Bros. / Polaris Productions / Hawk Films	Stanley Kubrick (director/screenplay); Malcolm McDowell, Patrick Magee, Michael Bates, Warren Clarke, Michael Tarn, John Clive, Adrienne Corri, Carl Duering, Paul Farrell, Clive Francis, Michael Gover, Miriam Karlin	
D E C E M B E R	20	Harold and Maude	Paramount Pictures	Hal Ashby (director); Colin Higgins (screenplay); Ruth Gordon, Bud Cort, Vivian Pickles, Cyril Cusack, Charles Tyner, Eric Christmas, George Wood, Ellen Geer, M. Borman, Hal Ashby, Marjorie Eaton, William Lucking, Cat Stevens, Judy Engles, Shari Summers	
D E C E M B E R	20	Macbeth	Columbia Pictures / Playboy Productions / Caliban Films	Roman Polanski (director/screenplay); Kenneth Tynan (screenplay); Jon Finch, Francesca Annis, Martin Shaw, Terence Bayler, John Stride, Nicholas Selby, Stephan Chase, Paul Shelley	
D E C E M B E R	21	Such Good Friends	Paramount Pictures / Otto Preminger Films	Otto Preminger (director); Esther Dale (screenplay); Dyan Cannon, Ken Howard, James Coco, Jennifer O'Neill, Laurence Luckinbill	
D E C E M B E R	22	The Gang That Couldn't Shoot Straight	Metro-Goldwyn-Mayer	James Goldstone (director); Waldo Salt (screenplay); Jerry Orbach, Leigh Taylor-Young, Jo Van Fleet, Lionel Stander, Robert De Niro, Hervé Villechaize	
D E C E M B E R	22	Kidnapped	British Lion Films / Omnibus Productions Ltd.	Delbert Mann (director); Jack Pulman (screenplay); Michael Caine, Trevor Howard, Jack Hawkins, Donald Pleasence, Lawrence Douglas\	
D E C E M B E R	22	Minnie and Moskowitz	Universal Pictures	John Cassavetes (director/screenplay); Gena Rowlands, Seymour Cassel, Val Avery, Tim Carey, Katherine Cassavetes, John Cassavetes, Alexandra Cassavetes, Zoe R. Cassavetes, Lady Rowlands, Holly Near, Judith Roberts, Kathleen O'Malley	
D E C E M B E R	22	Star Spangled Girl	Paramount Pictures	Jerry Paris (director); Arnold Margolin, Jim Parker (screenplay); Sandy Duncan, Tony Roberts, Todd Susman, Elizabeth Allen, Allen Jung, Helen Kleeb, Harry Northup, Peter Hobbs, Artie Lewis, Gordon Bosserman, Jim Conners	
D E C E M B E R	23	Bad Man's River	Scotia International	Eugenio Martín (director/screenplay); Philip Yordan (screenplay); Lee Van Cleef, Gina Lollobrigida, James Mason, Simón Andreu, Gianni Garko, Diana Lorys, Sergio Fantoni	
D E C E M B E R	23	Dirty Harry	Warner Bros. / The Malpaso Company	Don Siegel (director); Harry Julian Fink, R. M. Fink, Dean Riesner (screenplay); Clint Eastwood, Harry Guardino, Reni Santoni, John Vernon, Andy Robinson, John Larch, John Mitchum, Mae Mercer, Ruth Kobart, Woodrow Parfrey, Josef Sommer	
D E C E M B E R	29	Straw Dogs	Cinerama Releasing Corporation / ABC Pictures / Talent Associates / Amerbroco Films	Sam Peckinpah (director/screenplay); David Zelag Goodman (screenplay); Dustin Hoffman, Susan George, Peter Vaughan, T. P. McKenna, Del Henney, Jim Norton	
D E C E M B E R	30	Diamonds Are Forever	United Artists / Eon Productions	Guy Hamilton (director); Richard Maibaum, Tom Mankiewicz (screenplay); Sean Connery, Jill St. John, Charles Gray, Lana Wood, Jimmy Dean, Bruce Cabot, Bruce Glover, Putter Smith, Norman Burton, Joseph Fürst, Bernard Lee	

== See also ==
- 1971 in the United States
