= Making It (film) =

1971 film by John Erman

- Theatrical release poster
- Directed by: John Erman
- Screenplay by: Peter Bart
- Based on: What Can You Do? by James Leigh
- Produced by: Albert S. Ruddy
- Starring: Kristoffer Tabori; Marlyn Mason; Bob Balaban; Joyce Van Patten
- Cinematography: Richard C. Glouner
- Edited by: Allan Jacobs
- Music by: Charles Fox
- Production company: Alfran Productions
- Distributed by: 20th Century Fox
- Release date: March 21, 1971
- Running time: 97 minutes
- Country: United States
- Language: English
- Budget: $850,000

Making It is a 1971 comedy-drama film directed by John Erman and written by Peter Bart. It stars Kristoffer Tabori, Bob Balaban, Lawrence Pressman, Dick Van Patten, Joyce Van Patten, and Marlyn Mason. Adapted from James Leigh's 1965 novel What Can You Do?, the film follows several months in the life of an intelligent, precocious 17-year-old high school student who fancies himself a smooth Lothario.

== Plot ==
Phil Fuller is a 17-year-old high school student who lives in a small apartment with his young single mother. He assumes a facade of cynicism and tells his English teacher that he considers himself "smarter than 99% of the people". Seduction is his hobby. He beds the neglected wife of the high school basketball coach by feigning being a sexually pent up virgin. Phil seduces a virginal classmate by inviting her for a swim. Instead of a swim though, he pretends to make dinner for the two of them and spikes her food with pot. He even picks up a college girl by slapping on a fake mustache and hanging around the college bookstore.

Phil seems to sail through life not taking his actions seriously until the repercussions of his actions begin to hit home. First, the classmate he deflowered tells him that she might be pregnant. While the girl wants to get married, Phil convinces her mother, who also tried to seduce him, that her daughter should get an abortion instead. Next, he finds out that the gym teacher's wife, who has a phobia about growing old, told her husband about the affair after Phil dumps her. Then the coach defends his wife's honor by strong-arming Phil into a deserted weight room and kneeing him in the crotch.

After arranging an illegal abortion for his pregnant girlfriend, he finds out that she is not pregnant but his mother is. Since her fiancé has been killed in an auto accident, she decides to get an abortion. Phil uses the money he had gotten for his girlfriend and brings his mother to the doctor instead. The doctor assumes that Phil is responsible for the pregnancy. Full of scorn and wanting to teach Phil a lesson, he forces Phil to assist in the abortion. On the drive home afterward, Phil's mother sees that this episode has rendered him less cocky and more mature and responsible.

== Cast ==
- Paul Appleby as Ray
- Carol Arthur as Mrs. Warren
- Bob Balaban as Wilkie
- David Doyle as Fanning
- John Fiedler as Ames
- Pamela Hensley as Bargirl
- Casey King as Cafeteria Cashier
- Louise Latham as Mrs. Wilson
- Marlyn Mason as Yvonne
- Doro Merande as Librarian
- Sherry Miles as Debbie
- Denny Miller as Skeeter
- Lawrence Pressman as Mallory
- Maxine Stuart as Miss Schneider
- Kristoffer Tabori as Phil Fuller
- Tom Troupe as Dr. Shurtleff
- Dick Van Patten as Warren
- Joyce Van Patten as Betty Fuller

== Music ==
The film score was composed by Charles Fox who composed hits such as "Killing Me Softly with His Song" and "I've Got a Name" as well as the theme songs for Love, American Style; Happy Days; and Laverne and Shirley. The film featured two songs, "Morning Song" and "The All American" with music by Fox and lyrics by his frequent collaborator, Norman Gimbel.

== Reception ==
In the Chicago Sun-Times, film critic Roger Ebert wrote:

Making It is a curiously unfinished movie. It has all these serious things to tell us about youth, age, the generation gap and growing up in upper-middle-class America. It sneaks up and whispers them in our ear. And just when we're nodding in agreement, the movie gets embarrassed and changes the subject, and we're watching a cheap comedy situation or a sight gag. Like the adolescent it's about, Making It has an inadequate attention span.

== See also ==
- List of American films of 1971
