= Outrage (1973 film) =

- Genre: Crime; Drama; Thriller
- Written by: William Wood
- Directed by: Richard T. Heffron
- Starring: Robert Culp; Marlyn Mason; Beah Richards
- Music by: Jimmie Haskell
- Country of origin: United States
- Original language: English

Production
- Producer: Michael C. Green
- Cinematography: John M. Stephens
- Editor: Ronald J. Fagan
- Running time: 74 min.
- Production company: ABC Circle Films

Original release
- Network: ABC
- Release: November 28, 1973

Outrage is a 1973 made-for-television film that aired on the American Broadcasting Company's (ABC) popular Movie of the Week franchise. The movie, which originally aired on November 28, 1973, tells the story of a suburban neighborhood and family that is repeatedly terrorized by a group of privileged young men from neighboring families. The film is set in an idealized rural suburban community.

The film stars Robert Culp, Marlyn Mason and Beah Richards, and featured Nicholas Hammond, James Sikking, Thomas Leopold, and Mark Lenard. The film was directed Richard T. Heffron, and written by writer William Wood.

The film was originally titled One Angry Man. Turner Classic Movies lists the title of the film as "Outrage!" with the addition of the exclamation point. The movie would later inspire a 1998 TV film remake of the same name with Rob Lowe and Jennifer Grey.

== Plot summary ==
Jim Kiler, a suburbanite, finds himself and his family at the mercy of a group of young men from neighboring families who have singled out the Kilers after running roughshod over the greater community. While Kiler attempts at first to reason with the youths, their response is to step up the attacks on the family, which grow more emboldened and dangerous as the film continues. Kiler and his wife eventually feel that in addition to their personal safety, the youths are also trying to tempt their young daughter into situations that would harm her.

Kiler tries to talk to the parents of the young men. However, the parents of the youths either refuse to believe that their sons are capable of their actions, or blame Kiler for aggravating the situation. The parents of the youths are also self-absorbed in their own issues and resent Kiler's suggestions that they are at fault for their sons inability to tell right from wrong. Local law enforcement officials are unable and/or unwilling to become involved. Kiler and his family find themselves surrounded by people refusing to take action, or in denial that Kiler's claims are as dire as he says.

As the family finds itself reaching a point where a resolution has been found, the youths launch an attack on the family, which injures a member of the household. This action finally prompts the rational, logical Kiler to abandon his peaceful approach and take matters into his own hands as his outrage reaches the breaking point.

The film leaves the viewer with some satisfaction that he is able to avenge his family's torment by attacking the youths. At the end of the film, it notes, as it did in real life, that no charges were pressed on Kiler, and there were no more issues with the youths.

== Cast ==
- Robert Culp as Jim Kiler
- Marlyn Mason as Muriel Kiler
- Beah Richards as Thelma
- Jacqueline Scott as Mrs. Chandler
- Ramon Bieri as Deputy Tottif
- Tom Leopold as Vance Chandler (as Thomas Leopold)
- Mark Lenard as Mr. Chandler
- Ivor Francis as Judge William Vernon
- Nicholas Hammond as Ron Werner
- Paul Jenkins as Deputy
- Don Dubbins as Mr. Werner
