= Lanna Saunders =

American actress (1941–2007)

- Born: December 22, 1941; New York City, U.S.
- Died: March 10, 2007 (aged 65)
- Years active: 1954–1985
- Spouse: Lawrence Pressman (m. 1973)
- Children: 1
- Father: Nicholas Saunders
- Relatives: Nicholas Soussanin (grandfather)

Svetlana "Lanna" Saunders (December 22, 1941 – March 10, 2007) was an American actress, best known for her role as Marie Horton on the television soap opera Days of Our Lives, on which she appeared from 1979–85. She also played the characters Betty Andrews on the CBS daytime soap opera The Young and the Restless and Julie Evans on the NBC soap opera The Doctors in 1968.

== Early years ==
Saunders was born on December 22, 1941, in New York City. Saunders's father was actor Nicholas Saunders (né Nikita Nikolayevich Soussanin) and her grandfather was Russian actor Nicholas Soussanin.

== Career ==
Saunders started in acting at age 13, studying under Elia Kazan and later joining his Lincoln Center Company. Her credits on Broadway included Philadelphia, Here I Come! (1966), The Changeling (1964), Never Live Over a Pretzel Factory (1964), Milk and Honey (1961), and Sunrise at Campobello (1958).

== Personal life and death ==
Saunders was married to Andre Yedigaroff. She met her future husband, actor Lawrence Pressman, when she was a student of Kazan, and they were married until her death. Actor David Pressman is their son.

Saunders was diagnosed with multiple sclerosis in 1982 and she left Days of our Lives three years later when she became too ill to continue in the role. She died on March 10, 2007.

== Filmography ==
Year	Title	Role	Notes
1959	Deadline	Holly Webster	episode: "Character Witness"
1968	The Doctors	Julie Evans	3 episodes; uncredited
1972	McCloud	Stewardess	episode: "The Barefoot Stewardess Caper"
1974	Marcus Welby, M.D.	Nurse McCarthy	episode: "Child of Silence"
1975	The Waltons	Rebecca Cook	episode: "The Matchmakers"
1976	Everybody Rides the Carousel	Stage 7	Voice role
1977−78	Barnaby Jones	Paula Dixon; Sandy Wright	episodes: "Yesterday's Terror" & "Nest of Scorpions"
1978	The Six Million Dollar Man	Vera Cheraskin	episode: "Walk a Deadly Wing"
1978	Ruby and Oswald	Marina Oswald	Television film
1978	A Family Upside Down	Mrs. Lovell	Television film
1978	Fantasy Island	Joyce Stanton	episode: "Charlie's Cherubs"
1979−85	Days of Our Lives	Marie Horton	557 episodes
1981	Body Heat	Roz Kraft	
1983	Hart to Hart	Monica Haines	episode: "As the Hart Turns"
