= Lawrence Pressman =

American actor (born 1939)

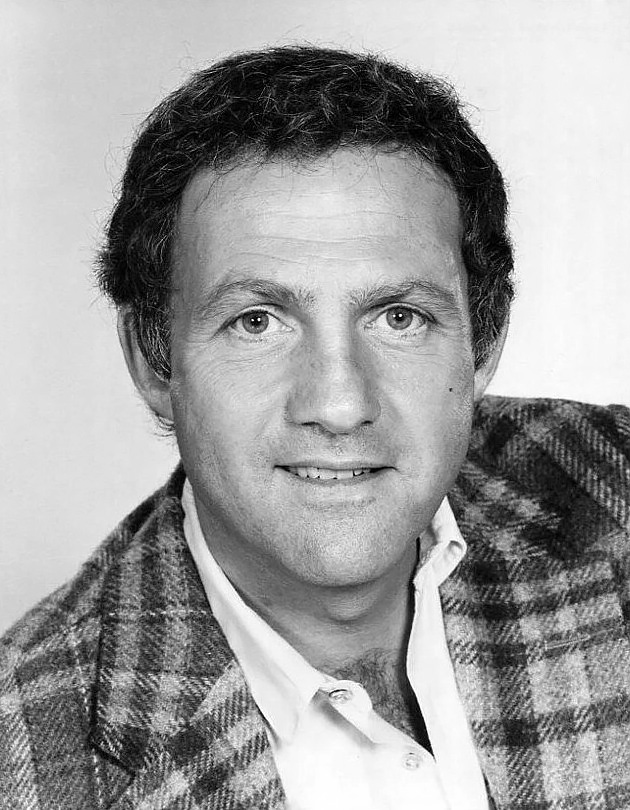
- Pressman in Ladies' Man, c. 1980
- Born: David Milton Pressman; July 10, 1939 (age 87); Cynthiana, Kentucky, U.S.
- Occupation: Actor
- Years active: 1969–present
- Spouse: Lanna Saunders (m. 1973; died 2007)
- Children: 1
- Relatives: Nicholas Saunders (father-in-law), Nicholas Soussanin (grandfather-in-law)

Lawrence Pressman (born David Milton Pressman; July 10, 1939) is an American actor. He is best known for roles on Doogie Howser, M.D., Ladies' Man, Profiler, the title character on Mulligan's Stew, as a fictional scientist in the 1971 film The Hellstrom Chronicle, as well as films such as 9 to 5, Shaft, and American Pie.

With an extensive stage career, Pressman starred on Broadway in The Man in the Glass Booth directed by Harold Pinter (also on London's West End), Play it Again, Sam, and Never Live Over a Pretzel Factory, for which he won the Theatre World Award.

== Career ==
His first role was on the soap opera The Edge of Night, and one of his first movie starring roles was in Shaft (1971). In 1971, Pressman starred in The Hellstrom Chronicle, which won the Academy Award for Best Documentary Feature, the BAFTA Award for Best Documentary, and premiered at the Cannes Film Festival.

Other film credits include Making It (1971), 9 to 5 (1980), The Hanoi Hilton (1987), Trial and Error (1997), Mighty Joe Young (1998) and American Pie (1999).

He has appeared in TV movies such as The Gathering, A Fighting Choice, Victims for Victims: The Theresa Saldana Story. Guest roles on American television series includes episodes of Hawaii Five-O, The Bob Newhart Show, The Mary Tyler Moore Show, Dawson's Creek, The Drew Carey Show, Law & Order, Matlock, Marcus Welby, M.D., Gilmore Girls, M*A*S*H, The West Wing, NCIS, Star Trek: Deep Space Nine and Criminal Minds.

Pressman played Bill Denton in the 1976 miniseries Rich Man, Poor Man. He portrayed H. R. Haldeman in the 1979 CBS miniseries Blind Ambition, and also appeared in the 1983 mini-series The Winds of War.

Prolific on stage, Pressman won the Theatre World Award for his Broadway debut in Never Live Over a Pretzel Factory. He starred in The Man in the Glass Booth, directed by Harold Pinter, on both the West End and Broadway. He co-starred in the original Broadway production of Woody Allen's Play it Again, Sam. In 1966, Pressman starred in the inaugural production and multiple subsequent productions of The Repertory Theatre of St. Louis. Pressman played Berowne in Michael Kahn's staging of Love's Labour's Lost at the American Shakespeare Festival in 1968. In 1976, Pressman starred as the titular character in Henry V for the second season of the Pittsburgh Public Theatre. In 1978, Pressman starred in Alan Ackbourn's Absurd Person Singular opposite Eve Arden, Stockard Channing, Roberta Maxwell, and John McMartin at Center Theatre Group's Ahmanson Theatre. In 1987, Pressman starred in the world premiere of Lee Blessing's A Walk in the Woods at La Jolla Playhouse, directed by Des McAnuff. In 1998, Pressman starred as James Tyrone in Marshall Mason's staging of Long Day's Journey Into Night. In 2005, Pressman starred in The Paris Letter at Center Theater Group. In 2006, Pressman starred Off-Broadway in Paul Weitz's Show People at Second Stage Theater. In 2008, Pressman starred in Of Equal Measure at the Kirk Douglas Theatre. In 2016, Pressman starred in Casa Valentina at Pasadena Playhouse.

Pressman is a founding member of the Antaeus Theatre Company and the Matrix Theatre, both in Los Angeles.

== Personal life ==
Pressman met actress Lanna Saunders, daughter of actor Nicholas Saunders and granddaughter of actor Nicholas Soussanin, while studying with Elia Kazan; they were married in 1973 and had one child together, son David, before her death in 2007.

== Filmography ==
- The Hellstrom Chronicle (1971) as Dr Hellstrom
- Making It (1971) as Mallory
- Cannon (premier) (TV - 1971) as Herb Mayer
- Shaft (1971) as Tom Hannon
- Hawaii Five-O (TV - 1973) as Calvin Cutler
- 6 Rms Riv Vu (TV - 1974) as Richard Miller
- Winter Kills (TV - 1974) as Peter Lockhard
- The Crazy World of Julius Vrooder (1974) as Passki
- The Man in the Glass Booth (1975) as Charlie Cohn
- The First 36 Hours of Dr. Durant (TV - 1975) as Dr. Konrad Zane
- Requiem for a Nun (1975) - Gowan Stevens
- Everybody Rides the Carousel (1976) Stage 7 Voice
- The Trial of Lee Harvey Oswald (TV - 1977) as Paul Ewbank
- The Gathering (TV - 1977) as Tom
- Like Mom, Like Me (TV - 1978) as Michael Gruen
- Walk Proud (1979) as Henry Lassiter
- The Gathering, Part II (TV - 1979) as Tom
- 9 to 5 (1980) as Dick
- Cry for the Strangers (TV - 1982) as Glen Palmer
- Rehearsal for Murder (TV - 1982) as Lloyd Andrews
- The Red-Light Sting (TV - 1982) as Larry Barton
- The Three Wishes of Billy Grier (TV - 1984) as Frank
- Victims for Victims: The Theresa Saldana Story (TV - 1984) as Dr. Stein
- For Love or Money (TV - 1984) as Herb
- The Deliberate Stranger (TV - 1986) as Ken Wolverton
- The Hanoi Hilton (1987) as Col. Catheart
- Little Girl Lost (1988) as Lester
- Honor Bound (1988) as Maxwell
- She Knows Too Much (TV - 1989) as Robert Hughes
- Doogie Howser, M.D. (TV - 1989) as Dr. Benjamin Canfield
- Breaking Point (TV - 1989) as Gen. Smith
- Fire and Rain (TV - 1989) as Mr. Hamilton
- White Hot: The Mysterious Murder of Thelma Todd (TV - 1991) as Roland West
- To My Daughter with Love (TV - 1994) as Arthur Monroe
- The Enemy Within (TV - 1994) as Atty. General Arthur Daniels
- Star Trek: Deep Space Nine – episodes "Second Skin" (1994), "Ties of Blood and Water" (1997) as Legate Tekeny Ghemor
- The Rockford Files: I Still Love L. A. (TV - 1994) as Kornblum
- Angus (1995) as Principal Metcalf
- Star Trek: Deep Space Nine – episode "The Adversary" (1995) as Krajensky / Changeling
- Whose Daughter Is She? (TV - 1995) as Dr. Joe Steiner
- A Case for Life (TV - 1996) as Cardiac
- The Late Shift (TV - 1996) as Bob Wright
- The Sunchaser (1996) as FBI Agent-In-Charge Collier
- She Cried No (1996) as Edward Connell
- The Uninvited (TV - 1996) as Winston
- Trial and Error (1997) as Whitfield
- Chicago Hope (1997) as Bill Burke
- The Maker (1997) as Father Minnell
- My Giant (1998) as Doctor
- Very Bad Things (1998) as Mr. Fisher
- Michael Hayes (1998) as Bernstein
- Mighty Joe Young (1998) as Dr. Baker
- American Pie (1999) as Coach Marshall
- The West Wing (2000) as Ken Cochran
- Sex and a Girl aka Alex in Wonder (2001) as School Counselor
- Dr. Dolittle 2 (2001) as Governor of California
- American Wedding (2003) as Head Coach
- DC 9/11: Time of Crisis (TV - 2003) as Vice President Dick Cheney
- Murder Without Conviction (TV - 2004) as Dr. G. K. Sanderson
- Nine Lives (2005) as Roman
- Fathers and Sons (TV - 2005) as Max's Father
- American Dreamz (2006) as White House Butler
- Mentor (2006) as Jonathan Kendall
- The Far Side of Jericho (2006) as Van Damm
- Cold Case (2007) as Robert Metz
- The Mentalist (2008) as Chancellor Stern
- Tickling Leo (2009) as Warren Pikler
- Mother and Child (2009) as Dr. Morgan
- Criminal Minds (2009) as Judge Boyd Schuller
- Beyond the Heavens (2013) as Pastor Jim
- Totem (2017) as Bernard
- 9-1-1 (TV - 2018) as Mitchell
- Reboot (TV - 2022) as Jerry
- Magnum, P.I. (2023) as Gus Urima
- Carol & the End of the World (2023) as Bernard
- No Good Deed (2024) as Victor Friedberg
- High Potential (2025) as George Donovan
