= Laila Novak =

Swedish actor and model

Laila Novak (29 January 1942 - 3 January 2026) was a Swedish model and actress.

Novak started her career in the modeling industry in Stockholm, Sweden with a diploma from Kim Söderlund's Model and Fashion School in 1960. She later moved to Paris, France to continue her work as a model, and also taking acting classes. When she moved to Mexico, her acting career started taking off, which led to the leading role in the movie Vanessa, among others.

Her modeling and movie career continued in Italy, and as of 2009, Novak continued to do model work.

== Filmography ==
- 1972 - Gli ordini sono ordini (IT)
- 1972 - El metiche - (MEX)
- 1972 - Vanessa - (MEX)
- 1971 - Lawman/Lagens man - (US)
- 1970 - Cruz de amor - (MEX)
- 1970 - Paraiso - (MEX)
- 1970 - Ha entrado una mujer - (MEX)
- 1970 - Rosas blancas para mi hermana negra - (MEX)
- 1969 - Capulina - (MEX)
- 1969 - Puente de amor - (MEX)
- 1969 - Tapame contigo - (MEX)
- 1969 - Rosie - (MEX)
- 1965 - La Paris de Scandinaves - (FR)
- 1963 - I tabú - (FR)
- 1963 - Il diavolo/Kärlek i Stockholm - (IT)
- 1962 - Actualité Francé - (FR)
- 1959 - Roulette e roulette - (IT)
