= Terry Wilson (actor) =

American actor (1923–1999)

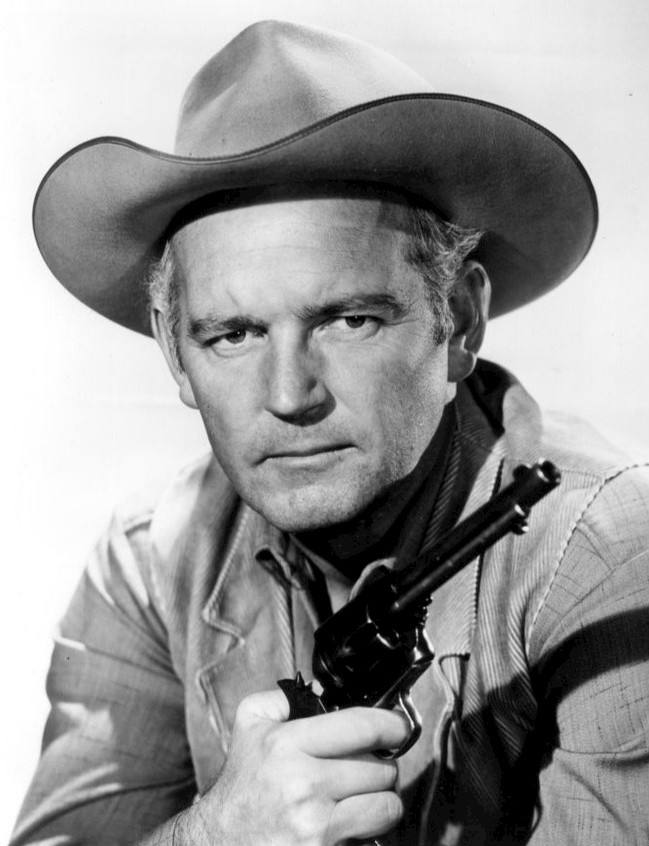
- Wilson as Bill Hawks, 1962
- Born: Terry W. Wilson; September 3, 1923; Huntington Park, California, U.S.
- Died: March 30, 1999 (aged 75); Canoga Park, California, U.S.
- Resting place: Pierce Brothers Valley Oaks Memorial Park, Westlake Village, California
- Occupations: Actor; stunt performer
- Years active: 1948–1981
- Spouse: Mary Ann Wilson (m. 19??)
- Children: 3

Terry W. Wilson (September 3, 1923 – March 30, 1999) was an American actor most noted for his role as "Bill Hawks", the assistant trail master, in all 267 episodes of the NBC and ABC western television series, Wagon Train, which aired from 1957 to 1965.

== Military service ==
Wilson was on active duty from May 1943 to March 1946. His first choice was to join the United States Marine Raiders, but instead he served in the Service Battalion, 7th Service Regiment, 5th Division, where he was a carpenter and heavy equipment operator with some truck driving. He was deployed on December 6, 1945, via USS Whiteside, which was in Okinawa in December 1945. Wilson was discharged from the U.S. Marine Corps on April 21, 1946, with the rank of Private First Class during World War II.

== Life and career ==
Wilson served with the U.S. Marine Corps during World War II. Upon leaving the service, Warner Bros. chose Wilson among a group of athletes to train for the stunt profession, with his initial specialties being fistfights and horse work. He appeared in more than thirty-five films and television programs between 1948 and 1981. Many of his early roles were uncredited. On July 2, 1953, he was cast as a stagecoach guard in episode 121, "Woman from Omaha", of The Lone Ranger. In 1956, he had another uncredited role as a robber in the ABC/Warner Brothers western series, Cheyenne, the first television western in an hour-long format, starring Clint Walker.

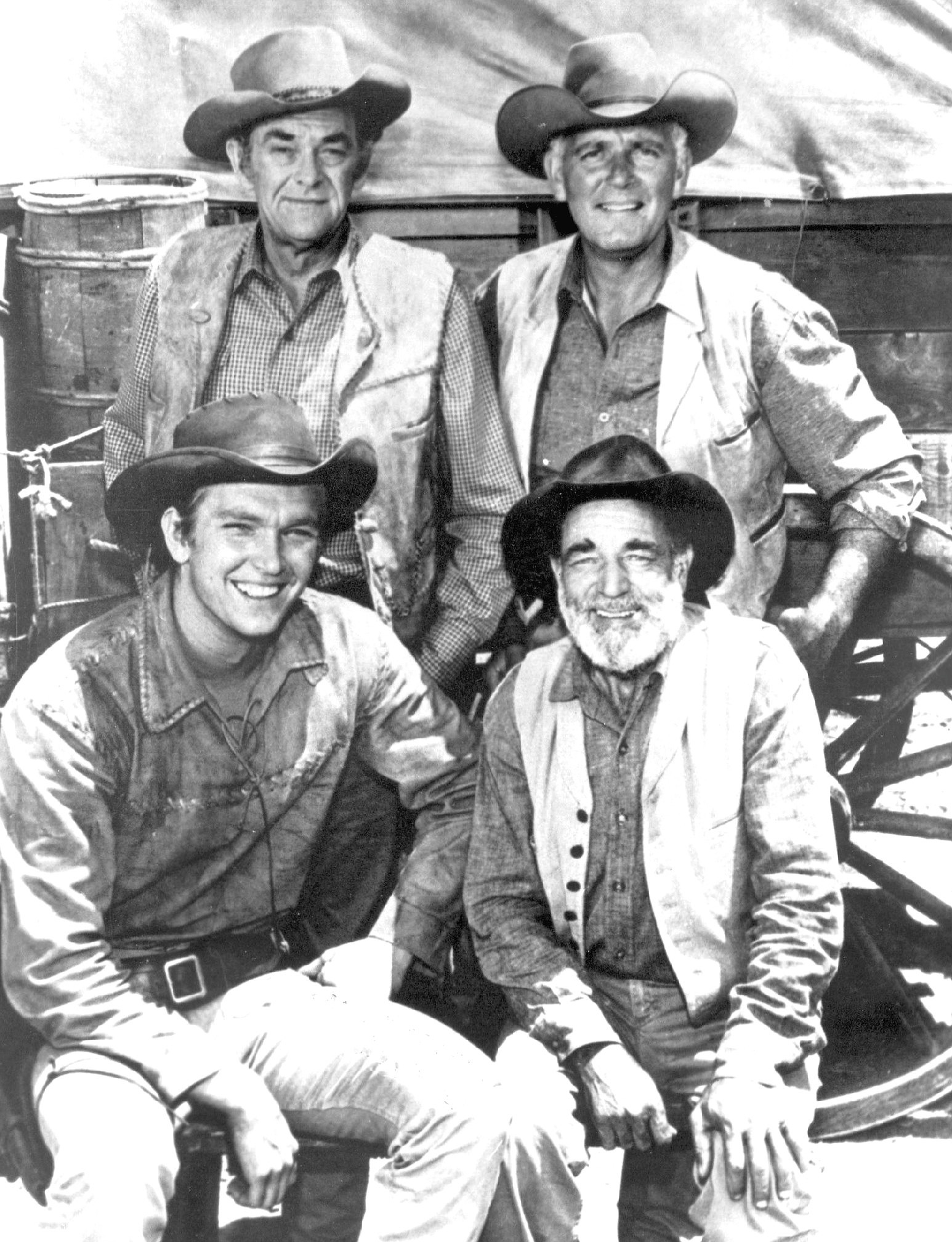
1962 Wagon Train cast (front, left to right): Denny Miller, Frank McGrath; (standing, left to right): John McIntire, Wilson

Wilson was with Wagon Train for its entire run and worked with all the other stars on the program, including Ward Bond, Robert Horton, John McIntire, Robert Fuller, Frank McGrath, Denny Miller, and Michael Burns.

After Wagon Train, Wilson appeared in several other westerns, including ABC's short-lived Custer and Hondo in 1967, in Don Knotts' The Shakiest Gun in the West in 1968, the film Dirty Dingus Magee in 1970, in four episodes of NBC's The Virginian/The Men from Shiloh starring James Drury in 1970 and 1971, in the James Garner picture Support Your Local Gunfighter in 1971, once on CBS's Gunsmoke in 1972, twice in Richard Boone's Hec Ramsey in 1973 and 1974, and as Judge Lennon in the episode "Counterall" of Buddy Ebsen's CBS detective series, Barnaby Jones.

Wilson portrayed Biff Jenkins in the 1975 Walt Disney film Escape to Witch Mountain. His last acting role was as Norman Scroggs in a 1981 episode of CBS's The Dukes of Hazzard.

In his early years, Wilson was a stunt performer for John Wayne in such films as Sands of Iwo Jima in 1949 and Rio Grande in 1950 (see below for more). He was part of the John Ford stock troupe and appeared as an uncredited extra in numerous dance scenes. He often appeared with his friend and fellow stunt performer Frank McGrath. In 1957, Ward Bond specifically requested Wilson and McGrath to be regulars on Wagon Train. When Bond died, it was Wilson who broke the news to Bond's best friend, John Wayne. He said, "Hold on ... Ward just dropped dead". It has been said that they both cried together on the phone. Wilson, along with John Wayne, McGrath, Harry Carey, Jr. (Dobe), and Ken Curtis, later Festus Haggen on Gunsmoke, were Bond's pallbearers.

Along with McGrath, Wilson appeared in a dance scene as a Texas Ranger, and both were in the "wedding party" in the John Wayne/John Ford film The Searchers. In Hondo, Frank McGrath had a speaking part, and Wilson doubled for John Wayne in the knife fight with the Indian Silva.

Wilson and his wife are interred at Pierce Brothers Valley Oaks Memorial Park in Westlake Village in Los Angeles County. They had three children.

== Filmography ==
Film
Year	Title	Role	Notes
1948	Belle Starr's Daughter	Cowboy	Uncredited
1948	My Hands Are Clay	Father O'Brien	
1949	A Dangerous Profession	Man	Uncredited
1950	The Flame and the Arrow	Guard	Uncredited
1951	Westward the Women	Lon	Uncredited
1952	Sailor Beware	Shore Patrol	Uncredited
1952	Bugles in the Afternoon	Barfly	Uncredited
1952	Blackbeard the Pirate	Pirate	Uncredited
1953	The Last Posse	Townsman	Uncredited
1954	Seven Brides for Seven Brothers	Town Suitor	Uncredited
1955	It's Always Fair Weather	Charlie's Henchman	Uncredited
1955	The Last Frontier	Sentry	Uncredited
1956	The Last Hunt	Second Buffalo Hunter	Uncredited
1956	The Searchers	Texas Ranger	Uncredited
1956	Tension at Table Rock	Saloon Brawler	Uncredited
1956	Pillars of the Sky	Capt. Fanning	
1957	The Wings of Eagles	Naval Officer	Uncredited
1966	The Plainsman	Sgt. Womack	
1967	The War Wagon	Sheriff Strike	
1968	A Man Called Gannon	Coss	
1968	The Shakiest Gun in the West	Welsh	
1970	Dirty Dingus Magee	Sergeant	
1971	Support Your Local Gunfighter	Thug	
1972	Rage	Kaufman Trucking Co. driver	
1973	One Little Indian	Stage Driver	
1973	Westworld	Sheriff	
1975	Escape to Witch Mountain	Biff Jenkins	
1977	Charge of the Model T's	Stonewall Adams	
1979	The Treasure Seekers	German seaman	
