= Diane Grayson =

English actress (born 1948)

Diane Grayson (born Diane C Guinibert in 1948 in Islington, London, England) is an English actress.

When she was 14, Grayson played Louisa in the musical The Sound of Music for 18 months at the Palace Theatre in London. She later played Jenny in The Prime of Miss Jean Brodie (1969) and Janie Harker in Emmerdale. Her earliest television role was as Penny Richardson (niece of motel owner Meg Richardson, played by Noele Gordon) in the early years of Crossroads. She also played Sandy Rexton in See No Evil (1971), a psychological horror film starring Mia Farrow.
