= Marlyn Mason =

American actress (born 1940)

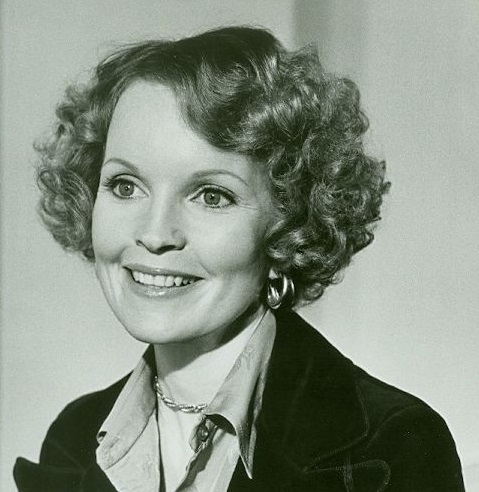
- Mason in 1976
- Born: August 7, 1940 (age 86); San Fernando, California, U.S.
- Occupations: Actress; producer
- Years active: 1960–present
- Spouse(s): J. Raymond Henderson (1960–1962) Lee Harman (m. 1972)

Marlyn Mason (born August 7, 1940) is an American actress and producer.

== Early life ==
Mason was born in San Fernando, California, and was named after a friend of a friend of her mother. Mason moved to Hollywood after she finished high school.

== Career ==
Mason played the role of Nikki Bell, a Braille teacher who became the title character's business partner, in the television series Longstreet (1971–1972), which starred James Franciscus.

Her other acting credits include roles in Hogan's Heroes (two episodes as underground operative "Lily Frankel", a Marlene Dietrich-style nightclub singer}, My Three Sons, Burke's Law, The New Phil Silvers Show, Kentucky Jones, Bonanza, The Big Valley, Ben Casey, Dr. Kildare (in a recurring role), Laredo, Occasional Wife, The Man from U.N.C.L.E., I Spy, The F.B.I., Mission Impossible, The Fugitive, Mannix, Vega$,The Invaders, The Odd Couple, Love, American Style, Marcus Welby, M.D., Cannon, Barnaby Jones, Gomer Pyle - U.S.M.C., Wonder Woman, The Bronx Zoo, Charles in Charge, Ironside, Jake and the Fatman, and in the episode "The Mask of Adonis" from the 1977 series Quinn Martin's Tales of the Unexpected (known in the United Kingdom as Twist in the Tale). She guest-starred on the final Perry Mason episode, "The Case of the Final Fadeout," portraying Erna Landry, a 'nice-girl' actress of a television show. She played Sgt. Margo Demarest in 12 O'Clock High Season 3, Episode 9 "The Fighter Pilot".

Mason played a principal role in the original 1967–68 Broadway production of How Now, Dow Jones, opposite Tony Roberts.

She appeared in the motion picture films Because They're Young (her film debut, in an uncredited role), The Trouble with Girls, and Making It. In 2019, she starred in the feature film Senior Love Triangle as the character Jeanie. She appeared in such television movies as That Certain Summer, Outrage, Attack on Terror: The FBI vs. the Ku Klux Klan, Last of the Good Guys, The New Adventures of Heidi, My Wicked, Wicked Ways: The Legend of Errol Flynn, and Fifteen and Pregnant.

== Personal life ==
Mason was married to musician J. Raymond Henderson from 1960 to 1962. She married Lee Harman in 1972.
