= Denny Miller =

American actor (1934–2014)

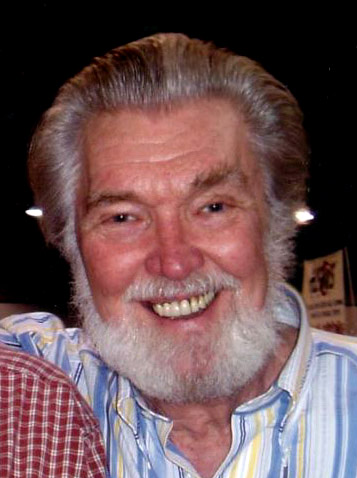
- Miller in 2007
- Born: Dennis Linn Miller; April 25, 1934; Bloomington, Indiana, U.S.
- Died: September 9, 2014 (aged 80); Las Vegas, Nevada, U.S.
- Occupations: Actor; author
- Years active: 1958–2014
- Spouse(s): Kit Smythe (divorced); Nancy Miller (at time of his death)

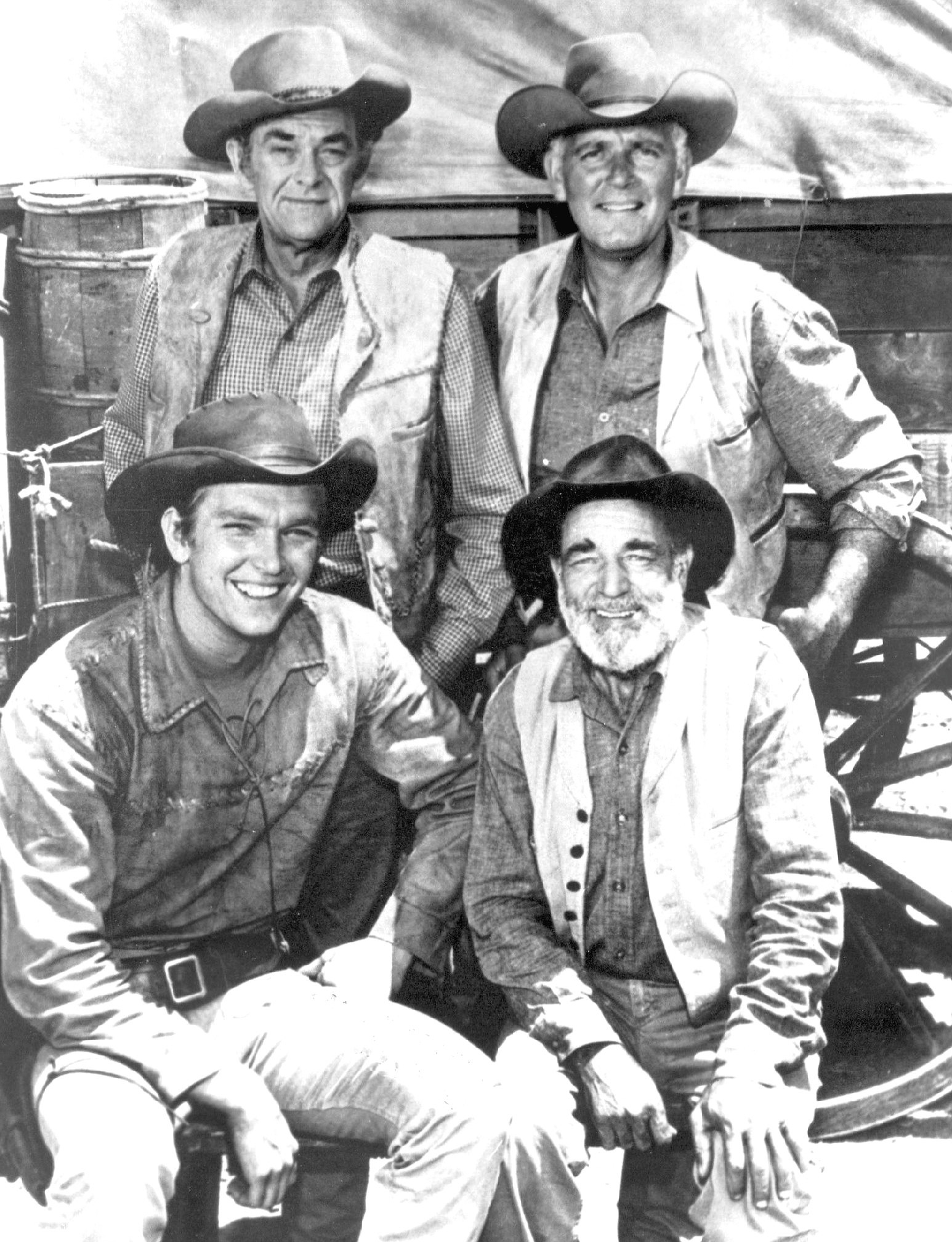
Wagon Train cast, 1962. Back row: John McIntire and Terry Wilson. Front row: Miller and Frank McGrath.

Denny Scott Miller (born Dennis Linn Miller; April 25, 1934 – September 9, 2014) was an American actor, perhaps best known for his regular role as Duke Shannon on Wagon Train, his guest-starring appearances on Gilligan's Island and Charlie's Angels, and his 1959 film role as Tarzan.

== Background ==
Miller was born in Bloomington, Indiana, to Bernard "Ben" Miller (1909–1999) and Martha Alice Miller (née Linn, 1911–2010). The 6'4' Miller was a basketball player for the UCLA Bruins at UCLA, where his father was a physical education instructor.

In his senior year, while he was working as a furniture mover to pay for school, Miller was discovered on Sunset Boulevard by a Hollywood agent who signed him with Metro-Goldwyn-Mayer. His screen test was directed by George Cukor.

== Acting career ==
Miller became the first blond Tarzan in Tarzan, the Ape Man (1959), a cheapie/quickie which lifted most of its footage from earlier Johnny Weissmuller movies. Miller had been recommended by someone else considered for the role, William Smith, later a star of the NBC Laredo western series. MGM had Miller under contract for twenty months; in that time, he worked only eight weeks as Tarzan.

Miller had guest spots on a number of television series, such as Northwest Passage and Overland Trail. In 1960, the 26-year-old Miller appeared as Wilkie, the son of a powerful rancher, in the "License to Kill" episode of Laramie. He also appeared on Have Gun – Will Travel and an episode of The Rifleman as a dimwitted gunfighter named Reuben Miles. From 1961 to 1964, Miller was a regular on Wagon Train in the role of the scout, Duke Shannon. After the cancellation of Wagon Train in 1965, Miller starred as Mike McCluskey on the NBC sitcom Mona McCluskey (1965–1966).

He guest starred on such series as Gunsmoke; The Fugitive; The High Chaparral; Gilligan's Island; I Dream of Jeannie; The Brady Bunch; Alice; Death Valley Days; Hawaii Five-O; Emergency!; The Six Million Dollar Man; Quincy, M.E.; The New Adventures of Wonder Woman; Battlestar Galactica; Quark; Charlie's Angels; Buck Rogers in the 25th Century; The Incredible Hulk; M*A*S*H; Magnum, P.I.; The Rockford Files and V, He appeared in over 200 television series and, for 14 years, he played the Gorton's Fisherman in TV commercials. He also portrayed Superman in an Air Force recruiting PSA.

His film career included roles in Love in a Goldfish Bowl (1961), and the part of "Wyoming" Bill Kelso in The Party (1968), which he remembered as the part he most enjoyed. His other film credits included Making It (1971), Doomsday Machine (1972), Buck and the Preacher (1972), The Gravy Train (1974), The Island at the Top of the World (1974), The Norseman (1978), Caboblanco (1980) and Circle of Power (1981).

== Books ==
Miller published an autobiography, Didn't You Used to Be...What's His Name?, as well as a book about obesity in the United States, Toxic Waist? ... Get to Know Sweat!

== Death ==
Miller was diagnosed with amyotrophic lateral sclerosis (ALS) in January 2014. He died in Las Vegas on September 9, 2014, at the age of 80.

== Filmography ==
Year	Title	Role	Notes
1958	Some Came Running	Dewey Cole	Uncredited
1959	Tarzan, the Ape Man	Tarzan	
1961	Love in a Goldfish Bowl	Oscar Flegler	
1965	Gilligan's Island	Duke Williams	“Big Man on a Small Stick”
1967	Gilligan's Island	Tongo The Ape Man	“Our Vines Have Tender Apes”
1968	The Party	William 'Wyoming Bill' Kelso	
1969	Hawaii Five-O	John Hayes	“Pray Love Remember, Pray Love Remember”
1971	The Virginian	Joe Terry	Season 9 Episode 15 "The Politician"
1971	Making It	Skeeter	
1971	Gunsmoke	Lijah	Season 17 Episode 9 "Lijah"
1972	Buck and the Preacher	Floyd	
1972	Doomsday Machine	Col. Don Price	
1973	The Brady Bunch	Tank Gates	season 5 episode 9 (Quarterbck Sneak)
1974	The Gravy Train	Rex	
1974	The Island at the Top of the World	Town Guard	
1976	Alice	Jack Newhouse	season 1 episode 2 (Alice Gets a Pass)
1977	Charlie's Angels	Helmut	season 2 episode 7 (Circus of Terror)
1978	The Norseman	Rauric	
1978	Rockford Files	Norman	season 5 episode 9 (Black Mirror)
1979	The Incredible Hulk	John Tobey	season 2 episode 8 (Killer Instinct)
1980	Caboblanco	Horst	
1981	Circle of Power	Uwe	
1981	The Incredible Hulk	Paul Corton	season 4 episode 14 (The Harder They Fall)
1984	Dallas	Max	“Blow Up”
2005	Hell to Pay	Horace the miner	(final film role)

== See also ==
- Mike Henry
- Buster Crabbe
- Lex Barker
- Ron Ely

== Notes ==
Honorary titles
Preceded by Gordon Scott	Actors to portray Tarzan; 1959	Succeeded by Jock Mahoney
