= See No Evil (1971 film) =

1971 film by Richard Fleischer

- Theatrical release poster
- Directed by: Richard Fleischer
- Written by: Brian Clemens
- Produced by: Martin Ransohoff; Leslie Linder
- Starring: Mia Farrow
- Cinematography: Gerry Fisher
- Edited by: Thelma Connell
- Music by: Elmer Bernstein
- Production company: Filmways
- Distributed by: Columbia Pictures
- Release dates: 2 September 1971 (United States); 16 September 1971 (United Kingdom)
- Running time: 89 minutes
- Countries: United Kingdom; United States
- Language: English
- Budget: $1.2 million

See No Evil (released in the United Kingdom as Blind Terror) is a 1971 psychological horror thriller film directed by Richard Fleischer, written by Brian Clemens, and starring Mia Farrow, Dorothy Alison, and Robin Bailey. It follows Sarah, a recently blinded woman, who is stalked by a psychopath while staying at her aunt Betty and uncle George's house in the English countryside.

An international co-production between the United States and United Kingdom, See No Evil marked Fleischer's second film produced under Filmways for Columbia Pictures, after 10 Rillington Place (1971). Fleischer described the film as "sheer entertainment" made "to scare the hell out of audiences". The film was shot on location in Berkshire, England.

It premiered in the United States on 2 September 1971, and was released in England two weeks later. Though a box-office disappointment in the United States, the film received some praise from film critics, particularly for Farrow's lead performance. Clemens received an Edgar Allan Poe Award nomination for Best Screenplay.

== Plot ==
After being blinded in a horse riding accident, Sarah visits her uncle George Rexton's stately home. Out on a date with her boyfriend, Steve Reding, she escapes the fate of her relatives, who are murdered at their home, along with the gardener Barker who has been shot, by a psychotic killer. Sarah returns from her date and spends the night in the house, unaware that three of her family members' corpses are strewn in various rooms.

Sarah eventually discovers the bodies. She is surprised to find Barker, who survived being shot and informs Sarah of what has happened. He also tells Sarah the killer is returning to retrieve a bracelet he left behind and directs her to where to locate it before succumbing to his injuries and dying. Sarah discovers the bracelet contains an engraved name on it, which she correctly assumes belongs to the killer. The killer returns to search for the lost bracelet. His face is only shown to the audience in the film's last scene, otherwise he is only shown from the knees down, wearing jeans and distinctive leather boots. He discovers Sarah, who manages to flee on horseback into the woods, where she meets and is saved by a Romani family.

When Sarah shows the family the bracelet, they see the name "Jack" inscribed on it. This leads Tom, the head of the family, to conclude his brother, Jack, must be the murderer, as he was dating Sarah's cousin Sandy, one of the murdered women from the estate. In an effort to save Jack, Tom pretends to take Sarah to the police but instead locks her in a secluded shed. His plan is to then round up the family and flee the area.

Sarah escapes from the shed and is found by Steve, out searching for her. She tells him all she knows. Steve and his men leave Sarah at his house to recuperate and begin a search for the killer, who they assume is one of the Romani. They come across the two brothers and are about to assault them when a frantic Jack explains that his brother suspected him of being the killer because of the name on the bracelet. However Jack insists he had nothing to do with it. They look at the bracelet again and see the name on it is actually "Jacko".

Steve, upon learning the killer's real name, hurries away with his men. Back at his house it is revealed that Jacko is one of Steve's workers, left behind to guard Sarah. The killer, still searching for his lost bracelet, is stealthily going through the pockets of Sarah's clothes, left beside the tub while she is taking a bath. When she reaches for a towel, she touches his hand. Both are momentarily startled, then Jacko attempts to drown Sarah in the bath. At the last possible moment, when it seems he has succeeded, Steve races in, just in time to save her.

== Cast ==
- Mia Farrow as Sarah
- Dorothy Alison as Betty Rexton
- Robin Bailey as George Rexton
- Diane Grayson as Sandy Rexton
- Brian Rawlinson as Barker
- Norman Eshley as Steve Reding
- Paul Nicholas as Jacko
- Max Faulker as Steve's Man
- Lila Kaye as Gypsy Mother
- Barrie Houghton as Jack
- Michael Elphick as Tom

== Production ==
=== Development ===
Interviewed in 1997, writer Brian Clemens recalled that he wrote the script "on spec" and Columbia Pictures told him: "'Well, if Mia Farrow plays the lead, we'll buy it,' and she read it and liked it, and so they bought it and we shot it." Director Richard Fleischer said Clemens "gave us a good story, a very workable one for a director, if tough on the star." Farrow's casting was confirmed in September 1970. It marked Farrow's first film since the birth of her twins Matthew and Sascha in February 1970. She was paid a sum of $200,000 for her role in the film, as well as ten percent of the film's profits.

The film was a co-production of interests from the United Kingdom and the United States, with the British Filmways producing under the American Columbia Pictures' distribution. Fleischer had just made 10 Rillington Place (1971) for the same producers, Martin Ransohoff and Leslie Linder. The film originally had the working title Buff.

Farrow visited a hospital for the blind as part of her research, and used special contact lenses during the shoot to help convey blindness. She also took equestrian lessons under stuntman Max Faulkner to learn to properly ride a horse.

=== Filming ===
Filming took place entirely on location in Berkshire, England, with a mainly British cast and crew. Principal photography began in early November 1970. Some filming took place in Wokingham.

=== Music ===
The original music score was composed by André Previn, who was married to Farrow at the time. Producer Leslie Linder disliked it and hired David Whitaker to write a new score. This was also thrown out and Elmer Bernstein was hired to write the music. Fleischer says what happened was after the film was completed they changed the "opening titles of the picture to give it more social significance". They wanted Previn to alter the music score but he was away in Russia. As Previn's contract said his music could not be altered, Fleischer claims they had to throw it out. Previn had a different version of the story.

== Release ==
See No Evil was theatrically released in the United States on 2 September 1971, premiering at Radio City Music Hall in New York City. It opened in London on 17 September 1971 under the title Blind Terror.

=== Home media ===
Columbia TriStar Home Entertainment released See No Evil on VHS on 5 July 1995. Columbia TriStar later released the film on DVD in North America in 2003. In the United Kingdom, Indicator Films issued a Blu-ray and DVD release on 25 September 2017.

== Reception ==
=== Box office ===
Its theatrical release in the United States was "a box office disappointment".

=== Critical response ===
See No Evil was met with mixed reviews from film critics. Roger Greenspun of The New York Times wrote:

See No Evil has its share of thrills. Cheap thrills, to be sure, but thrills none the less—and everything in the rest of Richard Fleischer's new movie... encourages us to value small favors. Attempting on the one hand to mean something and on the other hand trying to crank up the terror, Fleischer keeps suggesting confrontations between the rich and the poor, the old and the young, families with daughters to protect and men with warped desires. For all the potency of a camera movement, it can never have exactly the power of a conceptual image, and therefore See No Evil is better with its mindless terror than with its witless meaning. And although everything becomes far too much long before it is over, the movie is generally at it most ridiculous precisely where it hopes to make sense.

Variety called it "a perfect modern specimen of the old-style A-plus suspense programmer which often broke through to the big time... Superbly written... brilliantly photographed," while The Guardian called it "a simple exercise in suspense" that is "effective in only a purely mechanical way." "For sheer suspense", wrote The Palm Beach Post, it "may well be without peer", but, while praising the performance of Farrow, considered the "fiendish gamut" of injury her character is subjected to could "only be called sadism." Jim Meyer of the Miami Herald also described the film as "sadistic", but praised its realism, particularly in reference to Farrow's portrayal of a blind person. Kevin Thomas of the Los Angeles Times heralded Farrow's "tour-de-force" performance in a role "ideally suited for her gifts in expressing great vulnerability matched by fierce spirit," as well as praising Fleischer's direction, which he felt maintains "a pace so breakneck that there's simply no time to think about whether something is believable or not."

Donald Miller of the Pittsburgh Post-Gazette uniformly praised the cast, as well as the film's use of autumnal English country locations and its pacing. The Oregon Journal's Arnold Marks also praised Farrow's performance and the use of locations, deeming the film a "good shocker."

==== Retrospective ====
Later reviewers have described the film as a "creepy, atmospheric thriller", in the style of Terence Young's 1967 film Wait Until Dark, while critic John Derry highlights the way Mia Farrow is presented "from the first moment" as "the obvious victim".

Film historian John Kenneth Muir praised the film in his book Horror Films of the 1970s (2007), calling it "sadistic" and "one of those movies that is so successful at creating empathy for its star (and in expressing her limited point of view) that it becomes anxiety provoking."

=== Accolades ===
Institution	Category	Recipient	Result	Ref.
Edgar Allan Poe Awards	Best Screenplay	Brian Clemens	Nominated	

== Proposed remake ==
In April 2016, it was reported that Screen Gems was developing a remake of the film written by Mike Scannell, with Bryan Bertino co-producing the project. As of 2025, the project has gone undeveloped.

== See also ==
- List of films featuring home invasions

== Sources ==
- Allon, Yoram; Cullen, Del; Patterson, Hannah (2002). Contemporary North American Film Directors: A Wallflower Critical Guide. New York City, New York: Wallflower Press. ISBN 978-1-903364-52-9.
- Derry, Charles (1988). The Suspense Thriller: Films in the Shadow of Alfred Hitchcock. Jefferson, North Carolina: McFarland & Company. ISBN 978-0-7864-6240-7.
- Dixon, Wheeler W. (2000). The Second Century of Cinema: The Past and Future of the Moving Image. Albany, New York: SUNY Press. ISBN 978-0-7914-4516-7.
- Muir, John Kenneth (2007). Horror Films of the 1970s. Jefferson, North Carolina: McFarland & Company. ISBN 978-0-786-49156-8.
