= Nicholas Saunders (actor) =

American actor (1914–2006)

- Saunders in 1969–1970
- Born: Nikita Nikolayevich Soussanin; June 2, 1914; Kiev, Russian Empire
- Died: August 16, 2006 (aged 92); Los Angeles, California, U.S.
- Occupations: Film, stage, and television actor
- Children: 2, including Lanna
- Parents: Nicholas Soussanin (father); Olga Baclanova (mother)

Nicholas Saunders (né Nikita Nikolayevich Soussanin; June 2, 1914 – August 16, 2006) was a Russian-born American film, television, theatre actor, theatre translator and stage manager.

== Life and career ==
Saunders was born in Kiev, Russian Empire (present-day Ukraine), to Russian parents Nicholas, an actor, and Olga, an actress. He was raised in Hollywood, California.

Saunders began his career in 1938, appearing in the Broadway play The Bridal Crown, playing the pastor.

Later in his career, Saunders appeared and starred in other Broadway plays, including Lady in the Dark, playing Liza's father; A Highland Fling, playing Sandy MacGill; Happily Ever After, stage-managing and playing Stubbs; Marriage is for Single People, playing Reginald Hecuba; The Magnificent Yankee, playing Mason; The Fifth Season, stage-managing; A Call on Kuprin, playing Mr. Kendall and guard at Yalta; Take Her, She's Mine, playing the principal, Mr. Whitmyer, Frank Michaelson, and Mr. Hibbetts; The Passion of Josef D., language consultant and playing Sukhanov, Orjonikidze, and ensemble; Scenes and Revelations, playing Mr. Karonk; and Zoya's Apartment, translating the play with Frank Dwyer.

Saunders began his television career in 1947. In 1950, he played Sergeant Ross in the television series Martin Kane, Private Eye from 1950 to 1952. He also played Captain J. Barker in The Phil Silvers Show.

In 1990, Saunders retired. He won a Los Angeles Drama Critic's Award, which he shared with his writing partner Frank Dwyer, in 2005.

== Death ==
Saunders died on August 16, 2006 of lung cancer at his home in Los Angeles, California, at the age of 92.
