= Casey King =

American author, filmmaker, and historian

William Casey King ("Casey King") is an author, filmmaker and historian of ideas. He previously served on the as the director of the capstone program at Yale's Jackson Institute for Global Affairs. King has also served as the executive director of the Yale Center for Analytical Sciences and was formerly the executive director of the W.E.B. DuBois Institute at Harvard University. In the 1980s, prior to becoming an author and historian, King was a corporate bond trader for Salomon Brothers.

== Books and publications ==
King is the author of Ambition, A History, From Vice to Virtue published by Yale University Press in January, 2013. The book traces ambition's transformation from pernicious vice to celebrated American virtue. King also co-authored Oh, Freedom! Kids Talk About the Civil Rights Movement with the People who Made it Happen which was the recipient of the Flora Steiglitz Strauss Award in 1997. The book was the result of an oral history project that King conducted while an elementary school teacher in Washington, D.C.

King has written scholarly articles on abolitionists in film and ambition and sin in Anglo-American culture. He has written book reviews for The New York Times.

== Film and Play ==
Prior to publishing his two books, King wrote, directed and produced a documentary film on African American artist Henry Ossawa Tanner that was aired on many public television stations. King won a grant from the National Endowment for the Humanities to produce the film in conjunction with the Philadelphia Museum of Art.

In 2011, King also wrote and directed a historical play. Drawn from her letters, King wrote the play A Revolutionary Woman: An Afternoon with Mrs. Mercy Otis Warren. King directed performances of the play at the Yale University Art Gallery in September 2011.

== Work on Data Analytics and other subjects ==
King is also known for his work with data analytics, has taught "Big Data and Global Policies" at Yale, and has consulted for numerous governmental agencies. King also teaches courses on data analytics and anti-human trafficking, anti-money laundering and counter-terrorist financing. He uses big data analytics to study aspects of the financial markets. He performed a study on the efficacy or lack thereof of the SEC Circuit Breakers. He also served as a panelist on "The Volatility Economy: Wall Street, Main Street and the Middle Class" along with Robert Shiller, Jacob Hacker, Frank Hathaway and Joe Nocera. King also developed a Lexicon of words to assist in event risk hedging in the corporate bond market. He has presented his findings in several other venues, including delivering the keynote address at “Battle of the Quants,” New York, NY March, 2012.

== Personal ==
King was born in New York City but spent his early childhood on Greenfield Hill in Fairfield, Connecticut. He graduated from Phillips Academy Andover and then was an undergraduate at Tulane and Harvard University. He later received his PhD from Yale. King also went on to become an avid cyclist. While living in the south of France, King was a member of the French cycling team AVC Aix, now a farm team for the professional Cofidis team. He also rode for a UFOLEP team based in Cavaillon. In 2005, King broke away alone early in the "Challenge Yves Jullian" to win the race at least two minutes in front of the entire field. While pursuing his PhD in 2002, King also rode for the Yale Cycling Team, winning a silver medal at the collegiate national championships in the team time trial in 2002. He lives in Hamden, CT.
