= Un coup de baguette magique =

1997 television film

Un coup de baguette magique is a 1997 French TV movie written and directed by Roger Vadim. It starred Marie-Christine Barrault, Michael York and Sagamore Stévenin. It is a sequel to La Nouvelle tribu (1996).

It was Vadim's last movie.
