= Sagamore Stévenin =

French actor

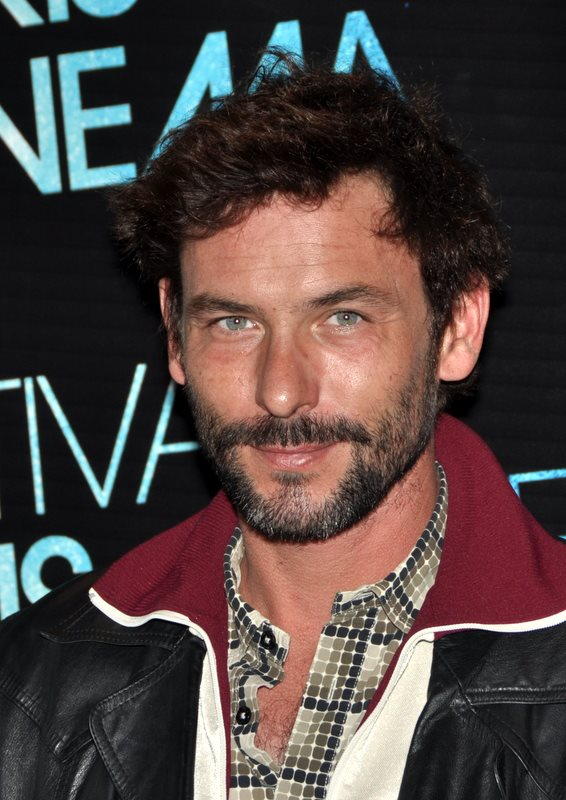
- Sagamore Stévenin in 2012
- Born: 9 May 1974 (age 52); Paris, France
- Occupation: Actor
- Years active: 1983–present
- Relatives: Jean-François Stévenin (father); Robinson Stévenin (brother); Salomé Stévenin (sister); Pierre Stévenin (brother)

Sagamore Stévenin (born 9 May 1974 in Paris) is a French actor, sometimes also listed Thomas Stévenin in film credits.

== Personal life ==
Sagamore's father is the actor Jean-François Stévenin. Also in the acting profession are his brother Robinson Stévenin, Pierre Stévenin and his sister Salomé Stévenin.

== Career ==
He began his career in the early 1980s as a child actor. From then until 2006, he has been in around 25 French films and TV movies, becoming internationally known in 1999 as the main male role in the film Romance directed by Catherine Breillat. This film ignited controversy due to its sexual themes and sparked public discussion about the difference between erotic art and pornography.

His first English-speaking role was as Étienne Balsan in the 2008 television film Coco Chanel starring Shirley MacLaine. Interestingly, he interpreted another role linked to Chanel in the Christian Dior and Coco Chanel WWI and postwar biopic TV series The New Look (2024) as cubist and surrealist poet Pierre Reverdy.

From February to May 2006, Sagamore acted in Paris in a French stage rendition of A Clockwork Orange.

== Filmography ==
Year	Title	Role	Director	Notes
1983	La couleur de l'abîme		Pascal Kané	TV movie
1984	Courtes chasses	The boy	Manuel Flèche	Short
1991	La Totale!	Julien Voisin	Claude Zidi	
1992	La révolte des enfants	Headedness	Gérard Poitou-Weber	
1994	Jalna		Philippe Monnier	TV mini-series
1996	Les frères Gravet	Pierre	René Féret	
1996	La Nouvelle tribu	Arthur	Roger Vadim	TV mini-series
1997	La cible	Chris	Pierre Courrège	
1997	Un coup de baguette magique	Arthur	Roger Vadim (2)	TV movie
1998	Comme une bête	Leo	Patrick Schulmann	
1999	Romance	Paul	Catherine Breillat	
1999	Le cocu magnifique	Bruno	Pierre Boutron	TV movie
2000	Bad Control	The guard	Arnaud Duprey	Short
2001	Lisa	Sylvain Marceau	Pierre Grimblat	
2002	Sueurs	Simon	Louis-Pascal Couvelaire	
2002	20, avenue Parmentier	Romuald	Christophe Jeauffroy	
2002	La liberté de Marie	Vincent	Caroline Huppert	TV mini-series
2003	Michel Vaillant	Michel Vaillant	Louis-Pascal Couvelaire (2)	
2003	Errance	The romano	Damien Odoul	
2003	La bête du Gévaudan	Pierre Rampal	Patrick Volson	TV movie
2004	Le point omega	Max	Laure Hassan	Short
2005	Tu vas rire, mais je te quitte	Arthur	Philippe Harel	
2005	Écorchés		Cheyenne Carron	
2005	Pre Face		Jean-Marc Minéo	Short
2005	Bel ami	Georges Duroy	Philippe Triboit	TV movie
2005	1905	Julien Peyrac	Henri Helman	TV movie
2006	Cages	Damien	Olivier Masset-Depasse	
2006	Un printemps à Paris	Pierrot	Jacques Bral	
2008	Coco Chanel	Étienne Balsan	Christian Duguay	TV movie
2009	T'essuies tes pieds steuplé!	Julien	Virginie Verrier	Short
2009	David Copperfield	James Steerforth	Ambrogio Lo Giudice	TV movie
2010	Concurrence loyale	Olivier Solano	Jean Luc Herbulot	Short
2010	Le mal dans le sang	Milo	Matthieu Serveau	Short
2010	Je, François Villon, voleur, assassin, poète	Colin de Cayeux	Serge Meynard	TV movie
2010	He's the One... Or Not	William	Vincent Giovanni	TV movie
2011	T'es pas la seule !	Samuel	Pierre-Antoine Hiroz	TV series (1 episode); Nominated - Monte-Carlo Television Festival - Outstanding Actor in a Comedy Series
2012	Les lettres de Saïgon	The father	Bénédicte Mathieu	Short
2013	Rouge Brésil	Gonzague	Sylvain Archambault	TV mini-series
2013–16	Falco	Alexandre Falco	Several	TV series (26 episodes)
2014	Mange tes morts		Jean-Charles Hue	
2016	Capitaine Marleau	Dimitri Nobecourt	Josée Dayan	TV series (1 episode)
