= Barth Jules Sussman =

American novelist

Barth Jules Sussman is a novelist, screenwriter, and children's book author married to illustrator Jen Sussman.

== Novels ==
- Shanghai (Signet - New American Library)
- Shanghai - (Amazon Kindle books / Barnes & Noble Nook Books)
- Wartime Spies of Berlin - (Amazon Kindle books / Barnes & Noble Nook Books)
- The Crooked Cross (Signet- New American Library)
- L'Homme au Boulet Rouge [editions Gallimard - France)
- Der Mann mit der Roten Kugel (Distelliteratur Verlag - Germany)
- The IG Farben File - (Amazon Kindle books)

== Children's books ==
- Muggy Au Cirque (Hachette - France)
- Muggy Recontre Bibi (Hachette - France)
- La Journee de Muggy (Hachette - France)
- Muggy CD-ROM Coloring Book for Children - (Muggy Press)

=== Children's electronic epub books ===
- Muggy the Happy Pug - A Lovely Day (Amazon Kindle Books/ Barnes & Noble Nook books )
- Muggy the Happy Pug - Muggy Meets Bibi (Amazon Kindle Books / Barnes & Noble Nook books)
- Muggy the Happy Pug - Muggy Goes to the Circus (Amazon Kindle Books / Barnes & Noble Nook books)

== Historical screenplays ==
- The Zaharoff Dossier - (Amazon Kindle Books / Barnes & Noble Nook Books)
- Nick Grand of the Riviera - (Amazon Kindle Books / Barnes & Noble Nook Books)
- Gangster From Odessa - (Amazon Kindle Books / Barnes & Noble Nook Books)
- Krupp & Mauser - (Amazon Kindle Books / Barnes & Noble Nook Books)
- Charleston & Savannah - (Amazon Kindle Books/ Barnes & Noble Nook Books)

== Screenplays ==
- The Stranger and the Gunfighter (1974, starring Lee Van Cleef - Columbia Pictures)
- Night Games (1980, directed by Roger Vadim - Avco Embassy)
- Save Me Cosmos Black (directed by John Pepper - American Film Institute- Los Angeles)
