= Michael York =

English actor (born 1942)

Michael York OBE
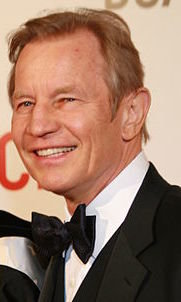
- York in February 2008
- Born: Michael Hugh Johnson; 27 March 1942 (age 84); Fulmer, Buckinghamshire, England
- Education: University College, Oxford
- Occupation: Actor
- Years active: 1964–present
- Spouse: Patricia McCallum (m. 1968)
- Relatives: Rick McCallum (stepson)

Michael York, OBE (born Michael Hugh Johnson; 27 March 1942) is an English actor. After performing on stage with the Royal National Theatre, he had a breakthrough in films by playing Tybalt in Franco Zeffirelli's Romeo and Juliet (1968). He played leading roles in several major British and Hollywood films, especially in the 1970s.

His most notable roles include Konrad Ludwig in Something for Everyone (1970), Geoffrey Richter-Douglas in Zeppelin (1971), Brian Roberts in Cabaret (1972), George Conway in Lost Horizon (1973), D'Artagnan in The Three Musketeers (also 1973) and its two sequels, Count Andrenyi in Murder on the Orient Express (1974), Logan 5 in Logan's Run (1976), and John the Baptist in Jesus of Nazareth (1977). In his later career, York found success as Basil Exposition in the Austin Powers film series (1997–2002).

York received a star on the Hollywood Walk of Fame and was also awarded the Order of the British Empire (OBE) at the 1996 Birthday Honours.

== Early life and education ==
Michael Hugh Johnson was born on 27 March 1942 in Fulmer, Gerrards Cross, Buckinghamshire, son of Florence Edith May Chown, a musician, and Joseph Gwynne Johnson, a Llandovery-born Welsh ex-Royal Artillery officer and businessman. York has an elder sister, Penelope Anne (born 1940) and younger twin sisters, Caroline and Bridget (born 1947); Bridget died a few hours after birth, according to York's autobiography. He was brought up in Burgess Hill, West Sussex.

York was educated at Bromley Grammar School for Boys, Hurstpierpoint College and University College, Oxford. He did some early acting at the community theatre Bromley Little Theatre (and later in 2014 became its president). This then led to his joining the National Youth Theatre, also performing with the Oxford University Dramatic Society and the University College Players. He began his career in a 1956 production of The Yellow Jacket. In 1959, he made his West End début with a small part in a production of Hamlet.

== Career ==
=== Early work 1960s and 1970s ===
Prior to graduating with a degree in English from the University of Oxford in 1964, York had toured with the National Youth Theatre, After some time with the Dundee Repertory Theatre, where he played in Brendan Behan's The Hostage, York joined National Theatre under Laurence Olivier where he worked with Franco Zeffirelli during the 1965 staging of Much Ado About Nothing.

Following his role as Jolyon (Jolly) in three episodes of the classic black-and-white British miniseries The Forsyte Saga (1967), York made his film debut as Lucentio in Zeffirelli's The Taming of the Shrew (1967). He then was cast as Tybalt in Zeffirelli's 1968 film adaptation of Romeo and Juliet. He starred in The Guru (1969), then played an amoral bisexual drifter in Something for Everyone (1970). In the 1971 film Zeppelin, he portrayed a World War I soldier with conflicted family loyalties who pretends to side with the Germans. He portrayed the bisexual Brian Roberts in Bob Fosse's film version of Cabaret (1972). In 1975, he portrayed a British soldier in 19th century colonial India in Conduct Unbecoming, the first of three films he did with director Michael Anderson. In 1977, he reunited with Franco Zeffirelli as John the Baptist in Jesus of Nazareth.

York starred as D'Artagnan in the 1973 adaptation of The Three Musketeers and he made his Broadway début in the original production of Tennessee Williams's Out Cry. One year later the sequel to The Three Musketeers was released (roughly covering events in the second half of the book) titled The Four Musketeers. Fifteen years later, most of the cast (and crew) joined together in a third film titled The Return of the Musketeers based on the Dumas novel Twenty Years After. He played the title character in the film adaptation of Logan's Run (1976), a fugitive who tries to escape a computer-controlled society. The following year, he starred in The Island of Dr. Moreau opposite Burt Lancaster.

=== 1980 to present ===
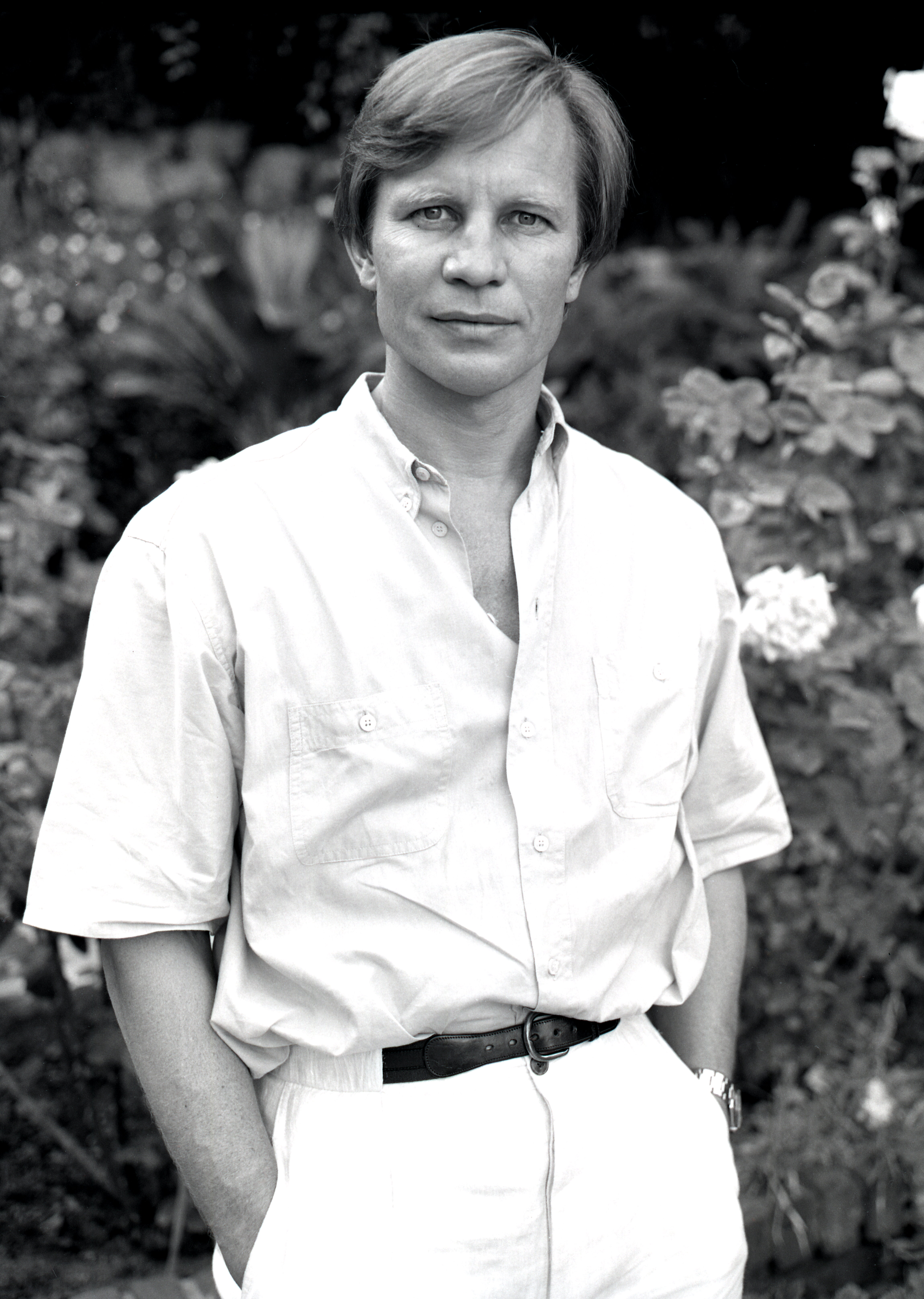
York in 1986

Following his early work in the late 1960s and the 1970s, York has had a varied career in film and television and on the stage. He appeared in two episodes in the second season of the Road to Avonlea series as Ezekiel Crane, the lighthouse keeper of Avonlea and foster father of Gus Pike. His Broadway theatre credits include Bent (1980), The Crucible (1992), Someone Who'll Watch Over Me (1993) and the ill-fated musical The Little Prince and the Aviator (1982), which closed during previews. He also has made many sound recordings as a reader, including Harper Audio's production of C. S. Lewis' The Lion, the Witch and the Wardrobe.

York appeared in the 1996 Babylon 5 episode "A Late Delivery from Avalon" as a delusional man who believed himself to be King Arthur. Two years later he would play King Arthur in A Knight in Camelot. He also appeared as Professor Asher Fleming, a 60-year-old Yale professor and boyfriend of Yale student Paris Geller (Liza Weil) during the fourth season of Gilmore Girls. Additionally, York voiced numerous characters in the DC Animated Universe: Count Vertigo and Montague Kane in Batman: The Animated Series, Kanto in Superman: The Animated Series, and Ares in Justice League Unlimited. York starred in both The Omega Code and its sequel, Megiddo: The Omega Code 2, as Stone Alexander, the Antichrist from Christian eschatology.

In 2002, York received a Star on the Hollywood Walk of Fame for his contributions to motion pictures. He played President Alexander Bourne of Macaronesia on seaQuest 2032. He played Basil Exposition in all three of the Austin Powers films. He has made an appearance on The Simpsons as Mason Fairbanks, Homer Simpson's possible father, in "Homer's Paternity Coot". In 2006, York played the character Bernard Fremont (inspired by real life serial killer Charles Sobhraj) in the Law & Order: Criminal Intent episode "Slither". He also appeared as a fictionalised version of himself in several episodes of the third season of Curb Your Enthusiasm as an investor in Larry's new restaurant 'BoBo's. In 2009, he lent his voice to Star Wars: The Clone Wars.

York voiced Petrie's uncle Pterano in The Land Before Time VII: The Stone of Cold Fire. In 2009, he narrated the entire Bible for The Word of Promise Audio Bible, a performance of the New King James Version. York again played King Arthur in a revival of Lerner and Loewe's Camelot, which began its run at the La Mirada Theatre in Southern California, and toured nationally in 2006 and 2007.

York portrays Luke in The Truth & Life Dramatised Audio New Testament Bible, a 22-hour audio dramatisation of the New Testament, which uses the Revised Standard Version Catholic Edition translation. In 2008, York took part in the BBC Wales programme Coming Home about his Welsh family history. In September 2013, York played Albany in the Gala Performance of William Shakespeare's King Lear at the Old Vic in London. In 2018, York starred in A Shakespeare Jubilee! directed by Louis Fantasia at The Wallis in Beverly Hills.

== Personal life ==
York met photographer Patricia McCallum in 1967 when she was assigned to photograph him, and they married on 27 March 1968, York's 26th birthday. His stepson is Young Indiana Jones and the Star Wars Special Editions producer Rick McCallum.

York was named to the International Best Dressed List Hall of Fame in 1977.

External videos
- Michael York Speaks at The National Press Club on amyloidosis, 4:00-60:00, 12 August 2016, National Press Club

=== Health problems ===
In 2013, York announced he was suffering from amyloidosis. Doctors initially thought he had bone cancer. He underwent a stem cell transplant, which can alleviate symptoms, in 2012.

In 2022, in order to be closer to the Mayo Clinic for treatment, York and his wife moved to Rochester, Minnesota.

== Acting credits ==
=== Film ===
| Year | Title | Role | Notes |
|---|---|---|---|
| 1967 | The Taming of the Shrew | Lucentio | |
| 1967 | Confessions of Loving Couples | Peter | |
| 1967 | Accident | William | |
| 1967 | Red and Blue | Acrobat | Short film |
| 1967 | Smashing Time | Tom Wabe | |
| 1968 | Separation | Himself | Uncredited |
| 1968 | Romeo and Juliet | Tybalt | |
| 1968 | The Strange Affair | Peter Strange | |
| 1969 | The Guru | Tom Pickle | |
| 1969 | Alfred the Great | Guthrum | |
| 1969 | Justine | Darley | |
| 1970 | Something for Everyone | Konrad Ludwig | |
| 1971 | Zeppelin | Geoffrey Richter-Douglas | |
| 1971 | Touch and Go | Basil | |
| 1972 | Cabaret | Brian Roberts | |
| 1973 | Lost Horizon | George Conway | |
| 1973 | England Made Me | Anthony Farrant | |
| 1973 | The Three Musketeers | D'Artagnan | |
| 1974 | The Four Musketeers | D'Artagnan | |
| 1974 | Great Expectations | Pip | |
| 1974 | Murder on the Orient Express | Count Rudolf Andrenyi | |
| 1975 | Conduct Unbecoming | Lieutenant Arthur Drake | |
| 1976 | Logan's Run | Logan 5 | |
| 1976 | Seven Nights in Japan | Prince George | |
| 1977 | Jesus of Nazareth | John the Baptist | |
| 1977 | The Island of Dr. Moreau | Andrew Braddock | |
| 1977 | The Last Remake of Beau Geste | Beau Geste | |
| 1978 | Fedora | Himself | |
| 1979 | The Riddle of the Sands | Charles Carruthers | |
| 1980 | Final Assignment | Lyosha Petrov | |
| 1981 | The White Lions | Chris McBride | |
| 1983 | For Those I Loved | Martin Gray | |
| 1984 | Success Is the Best Revenge | Alex Rodak | |
| 1986 | Dawn | John Dawson | |
| 1987 | Lethal Obsession | Dr. Proper | |
| 1988 | Phantom of Death | Robert Dominici | |
| 1988 | Midnight Cop | Karstens | |
| 1989 | The Return of the Musketeers | D'Artagnan | |
| 1990 | Come See the Paradise | Dance Hall Band | |
| 1991 | Eline Vere | Lawrence St. Clare | |
| 1992 | The Long Shadow | Gabor Romandy | |
| 1993 | Wide Sargasso Sea | Paul Mason | |
| 1994 | Discretion Assured | Trevor McCabe | |
| 1995 | Gospa | Milan Vukovic | |
| 1995 | A Young Connecticut Yankee in King Arthur's Court | Merlin | |
| 1995 | Not of This Earth | Paul Johnson | |
| 1997 | Austin Powers: International Man of Mystery | Basil Exposition | |
| 1997 | Goodbye America | Senator Bladon | |
| 1997 | Dark Planet | Capt. Winter | |
| 1997 | The Long Way Home | Narrator | Voice, documentary |
| 1997 | A Christmas Carol | Bob Cratchit | Voice |
| 1998 | Merchants of Venus | Alex Jakoff | |
| 1998 | Wrongfully Accused | Hibbing Goodhue | |
| 1998 | 54 | Ambassador | |
| 1998 | The Treat | Simon | |
| 1998 | Lovers & Liars | Dick Bunche | |
| 1998 | One Hell of a Guy | Devil | |
| 1999 | Austin Powers: The Spy Who Shagged Me | Basil Exposition | |
| 1999 | Puss in Boots | Puss in Boots | Voice |
| 1999 | The Omega Code | Stone Alexander | |
| 1999 | The Haunting of Hell House | Professor Ambrose | |
| 2000 | The Land Before Time VII: The Stone of Cold Fire | Pterano | Voice |
| 2000 | Borstal Boy | Joyce | |
| 2000 | A Monkey's Tale | Lankoo King | Voice |
| 2001 | Megiddo: The Omega Code 2 | Stone Alexander, Satan | |
| 2002 | Austin Powers in Goldmember | Basil Exposition | |
| 2002 | A Very Merry Pooh Year | Narrator | Voice |
| 2004 | Moscow Heat | Roger Chambers | |
| 2007 | Flatland: The Movie | Spherius | Voice |
| 2008 | Testimony: The Untold Story of Pope John Paul II | Narrator | Voice, documentary film |
| 2009 | Transformers: Revenge of the Fallen | Prime #1 | Voice |
| 2010 | Pravosudiye Volkov | Mikhail Polyakov | |
| 2010 | Quixote | Don Quixote | Voice, short film |
| 2010 | Tom and Jerry Meet Sherlock Holmes | Sherlock Holmes | Voice |
| 2010 | The Justice of Wolves | Mika | |
| 2010 | Quantum Quest: A Cassini Space Odyssey | Core | Voice |
| 2011 | The Mill and the Cross | Nicolaes Jonghelinck | |
| 2011 | Glad Christmas Tidings | Narrator | Voice |
| 2012 | Flatland 2: Sphereland | Spherius | Voice |
| 2014 | Sleeping Beauty | Narrator | Voice |
| 2025 | Dreams | Private Agent | |

=== Television ===
| Year | Title | Role | Notes |
|---|---|---|---|
| 1964 | Arrest and Trial | Pete Bakalyan | Episode: "A Circle of Strangers" |
| 1966 | The Wild Wild West | Gupta | Episode: “The Night of the Golden Cobra” |
| 1967 | Death Valley Days | Haynie | Episode: "The Man Who Wouldn't Die" |
| 1967 | The Forsyte Saga | Jolyon "Jolly" Forsyte | |
| 1968 | The Wednesday Play | Roger Porlock | Episode: "Rebel in the Grave" |
| 1974 | Great Expectations | Pip | TV film |
| 1977 | Jesus of Nazareth | John the Baptist | Miniseries |
| 1977 | BBC2 Play of the Week: True Patriot | Dietrich Bonhoeffer | TV film |
| 1978 | Much Ado About Nothing | Benedick | TV film |
| 1979 | A Man Called Intrepid | Evan Michaelian | Miniseries |
| 1981 | Vendredi ou la Vie Sauvage | Robinson Crusoe | TV film |
| 1982 | Twilight Theater | | TV film |
| 1983 | The Phantom of the Opera | Michael Hartnell | TV film |
| 1983 | The Weather in the Streets | Rollo Spencer | TV film |
| 1984 | The Master of Ballantrae | James Durie | TV film |
| 1985 | Space | Dieter Kolff | Miniseries |
| 1986 | ABC Afterschool Special | Chet Gordon | Episode: "Are You My Mother?" |
| 1986 | The Storybook Series with Hayley Mills | Beast | Voice |
| 1986 | Tall Tales & Legends | Ponce de Leon | Episode: "Ponde de Leon" |
| 1986 | Sword of Gideon | Robert | TV film |
| 1986 | Dark Mansions | Jason Drake | TV film |
| 1986 | Nevil Shute's The Far Country | Carl Zlinter | TV film |
| 1987 | The Far Country | George Miller | 2 episodes |
| 1987–1988 | Knots Landing | Charles Scott | 8 episodes |
| 1988 | The Secret of the Sahara | Desmond Jordan | Miniseries |
| 1988 | The Four Minute Mile | Franz Stampfl | Miniseries |
| 1989 | The Lady and the Highwayman | King Charles II | TV film |
| 1989 | Judith Krantz's Till We Meet Again | Paul de Lancel | Miniseries |
| 1990 | The Heat of the Day | Robert Kelway | TV film |
| 1990 | Night of the Fox | Field Marshal Rommel | TV film |
| 1991 | Road to Avonlea | Ezekiel Crane | 2 episodes |
| 1991 | Duel of Hearts | Gervaise Warlingham | TV film |
| 1992 | The Legend of Prince Valiant | Owen | Voice, 3 episodes |
| 1992 | Rochade | Paul Grumbach | TV film |
| 1992–1993 | Batman: The Animated Series | Count Vertigo, Montague Kane | Voice, 2 episodes |
| 1993 | Gardens of the World with Audrey Hepburn | Narrator | Voice, TV documentary film |
| 1993 | Tracey Ullman Takes on New York | Central Park Acquaintance | Comedy Special |
| 1994 | TekWar | Prince Richard | 1 episode |
| 1994 | ABC Weekend Special | King Sarastro | Episode: "The Magic Flute" |
| 1994 | Fall from Grace | Hans-Dieter Stromelburg | TV film |
| 1995 | Shadow of a Kiss | Albert | TV film |
| 1995–1996 | seaQuest DSV | President Alexander Bourne | 3 episodes |
| 1995 | The Naked Truth | Leland Banks | Episode: "Woman Jokes While Husband Cooks!" |
| 1995 | The Magic School Bus | Harry Herp | Voice, episode: "Cold Feet" |
| 1996 | La Nouvelle tribu | Ilya | Miniseries |
| 1996 | September | Edmund | TV film |
| 1996 | The Ring | Walmar von Gotthard | TV film |
| 1996 | Babylon 5 | David "King Arthur" McIntyre | Episode: "A Late Delivery from Avalon" |
| 1996 | Adventures from the Book of Virtues | Androcles | Voice, episode: "Compassion" |
| 1996 | Un coup de baguette magique | Ilya | TV film |
| 1997 | Superman: The Animated Series | Kanto | Voice, episode: "Tools of the Trade" |
| 1997 | Sliders | Dr. Vargas | Episode: "This Slide of Paradise" |
| 1997 | True Women | Lewis Lawshe | Miniseries |
| 1997 | The Ripper | Charles Warren | TV film |
| 1998 | Dead Man's Gun | Herr Friederich Von Huber | Episode: "The Collector" |
| 1998 | Glory, Glory | Rev. Hopewell | Pilot |
| 1998 | A Knight in Camelot | King Arthur | TV film |
| 1998 | Perfect Little Angels | Dr. Calvin Lawrence | TV film |
| 1998 | Search for Nazi Gold | Narrator | TV documentary |
| 2000 | Founding Fathers | Alexander Hamilton | TV documentary film |
| 2001 | The Lot | Colin Rhome | 2 episodes |
| 2002 | Liberty's Kids | Admiral Lord Howe | Voice, 2 episodes |
| 2002 | Presidio Med | George Slingerland | Episode: "Secrets" |
| 2002 | Founding Brothers | Alexander Hamilton | TV documentary film |
| 2002 | Curb Your Enthusiasm | Himself | 4 episodes |
| 2003 | La Femme Musketeer | Jacques D'Artagnan | TV film |
| 2003–2004 | Gilmore Girls | Professor Asher Fleming | 4 episodes |
| 2004 | Crusader | McGovern | TV film |
| 2004 | Justice League Unlimited | Ares | Voice, episode: "Hawk and Dove" |
| 2004 | Super Robot Monkey Team Hyperforce Go! | Master Zan | Voice, episode: "Antauri's Masters" |
| 2005 | Icon | Nigel Irvine | TV film |
| 2006, 2016–2020 | The Simpsons | Mason Fairbanks, Dr. Lionel Budgie, Nigel, Clay | Voice, 4 episodes |
| 2006 | Law & Order: Criminal Intent | Bernard Fremont | Episode: "Slither" |
| 2007 | The Replacements | Agent G | Voice, episode: "London Calling" |
| 2008 | Four Seasons | Stephen Combe | Miniseries |
| 2008 | Ben 10: Alien Force | Patrick | Voice, episode: "Be-Knighted" |
| 2009 | Star Wars: The Clone Wars | Dr. Nuvo Vindi | Voice, 2 episodes |
| 2010 | How I Met Your Mother | Jefferson Van Smoot | Episode: "Robots Versus Wrestlers" |
| 2010 | Family Guy | Documentary Speaker | Voice, episode: "Partial Terms of Endearment" |

=== Theatre ===
| Year | Title | Role | Notes |
|---|---|---|---|
| 1964-5 | The Royal Hunt of the Sun | T/O Indian | The Old Vic and Chichester Festival Theatre |
| 1964 | An Evening of Original and Macabre Theatre | The Interview: Bull | Dundee Repertory Theatre |
| 1965 | Much Ado About Nothing | | Bristol Hippodrome |
| 1965 | Much Ado About Nothing | Watchman | The Old Vic |
| 1965-6 | Armstrong’s Last Goodnight | Archie Armstrong | The Old Vic and Chichester Festival Theatre |
| 1965-6 | Trelawny of the Wells | Arthur Glower | The Old Vic and Chichester Festival Theatre |
| 1970 | Hamlet | Prince Hamlet | Thorndike Theatre |
| 1973 | Out Cry | | Broadway |
| 1975 | Ring Round the Moon | | Ahmanson Theatre |
| 1980 | Bent | | Broadway |
| 1981 | Cyrano de Bergerac | Cyrano de Bergerac | Santa Fe Festival Theatre |
| 1982 | The Little Prince | | Broadway |
| 1983 | Paying the Palace | | |
| 1990 | Whisper in the Mind | | |
| 1991 | The Crucible | | National Actors Theatre |
| 1993 | Someone Who'll Watch Over Me | | Broadway |
| 1993 | Norma | | Williamstown Theatre Festival |
| 1993 | Under Milk Wood | | |
| 1996 | Irwa Gershwin at 100 | Host | Carnegie Hall |
| 1997 | Magda's Story | | |
| 1997 | Live at the Lensic | | Benefit Variety Show, Santa Fe |
| 2001 | Conversations on “A Life in the Theatre” | | Pasadena Playhouse |
| 2001 | The Journey of Falstaff and Henry V | Narrator | Kennedy Center |
| 2001 | Scenes and Sonnets | | Kennedy Center |
| 2002 | Christopher Columbus: A Musical Journey | Christopher Columbus | |
| 2002 | Shakespeare at the Bowl | | Hollywood Bowl |
| 2003 | Dear Editor: A 90th Anniversary Celebration of Poetry Magazine | | |
| 2003 | For The Time Being: Advent | | |
| 2003 | Enoch Arden | | |
| 2003 | Broadway Goes to the Movies | | |
| 2004 | Russian David… Soviet Goliath | Dimitri Shostakovich | Aspen Music Festival |
| 2005 | Peer Gynt | Peer Gynt | |
| 2005 | Shadows and Voices: The Last Days of Tchaikovsky | Pyotr Ilyich Tchaikovsky | Aspen Music Festival |
| 2013 | King Lear | Albany | The Old Vic and St James Theatre |
| 2016 | Murder, Lust and Madness | | |

=== Video games ===
| Year | Title | Voice role | Notes |
|---|---|---|---|
| 1998 | Die by the Sword | Instructor | |
| 1998 | Tex Murphy: Overseer | J. Saint Gideon | |

== Bibliography ==
=== Autobiography ===
- Accidentally on Purpose: An Autobiography. New York: Simon & Schuster. 1991. ISBN 978-0-6716-8940-7..
- Travelling Player: An Autobiography. London: Headline. 1991. ISBN 978-0-7472-3306-0..

Also available in other editions

=== Other works ===
- York wrote about his experience with Megiddo: The Omega Code 2 in Dispatches from Armageddon. 2001, Smith & Kraus. ISBN 978-1-5752-5311-4.
- York is also the co-author, with director Adrian Brine, of A Shakespearean Actor Prepares. 2000, Smith & Kraus. ISBN 978-0-7394-1178-0.

== Awards and nominations ==
| Year | Award | Category | Work | Result | Ref. |
|---|---|---|---|---|---|
| 1970 | Laurel Awards | Golden Laurel – Male New Face | Romeo and Juliet | Nominated | |
| 1978 | Academy of Science Fiction, Fantasy and Horror Films | Best Actor | The Island of Dr. Moreau | Nominated | |
| 1986 | Daytime Emmy Awards | Outstanding Performer in Children's Programming | ABC Afterschool Special episode Are You My Mother? | Nominated | |
| 2000 | Temecula Valley International Film Festival | Lifetime Achievement Award | Outstanding TV/Film career | Won | |
| 2001 | DVD Exclusive Awards | Best Animated Character Performance | The Land Before Time VII: The Stone of Cold Fire (voice) | Nominated | |
| 2001 | 53rd Primetime Emmy Awards | Outstanding Guest Actor in a Comedy Series | The Lot | Nominated | |
| 2002 | Hollywood Walk of Fame | Motion Picture Star | Outstanding Film career | Won | |
| 2002 | Karlovy Vary International Film Festival | Town of Karlovy Vary Award | Outstanding TV/Film career | Won | |
| 2009 | 14th Satellite Awards | Mary Pickford Award | Veteran Actor Outstanding TV/Film career | Won | |
| 2011 | Transilvania International Film Festival | Lifetime Achievement Award | Outstanding TV/Film career | Won | |

== See also ==
- List of British actors
