= Romance (1999 film) =

1999 film by Catherine Breillat

- Theatrical release poster
- Directed by: Catherine Breillat
- Written by: Catherine Breillat
- Produced by: Jean-François Lepetit
- Starring: Caroline Ducey; Sagamore Stévenin; François Berléand; Rocco Siffredi
- Cinematography: Yorgos Arvanitis
- Edited by: Agnès Guillemot
- Music by: Raphaël Tidas; DJ Valentin
- Distributed by: Rézo Films
- Release date: 17 April 1999 (France)
- Running time: 99 minutes
- Country: France
- Language: French
- Budget: $2.7 million
- Box office: $3.9 million

Romance (Romance X) is a 1999 French arthouse film written and directed by Catherine Breillat. It stars Caroline Ducey, Rocco Siffredi, Sagamore Stévenin and François Berléand. According to Breillat, her other movie Anatomy of Hell is a "sequel" to Romance.

== Plot ==
Marie, a school teacher, is in a romantic relationship with Paul, but she is disappointed in his comparative lack of interest in sexual activity. One morning, Marie drives to a bar, where she meets Paolo; the two later have sex.

One day, Roberto, the headmaster, brings Marie to his house. The two begin engaging in BDSM until Marie asks him to stop, though she confesses to have imagined what it's like to be bound and implies that she enjoyed being gagged. On the way home, a man rapes Marie in the stairway; he leaves right as Paul returns, but the latter does not see her.

Upon returning home after a session with Roberto, Paul demonstrates interest in sex and manages to accidentally impregnate Marie. After one checkup during which the doctor reveals the baby's gender, the couple have sex for the first time in months – but also the last.

After an unhappy night out in a bar, Marie wakes up about to go into labor but Paul is out cold. Frustrated, she turns on the gas and leaves, with Roberto driving her to the hospital. She successfully delivers the child and as expected, Paul dies in the gas explosion. As his coffin is being lowered into the ground, Marie watches from a distance, the baby in her arms.

== Cast ==
- Caroline Ducey as Marie
- Sagamore Stévenin as Paul
- François Berléand as Robert
- Rocco Siffredi as Paolo
- Ashley Wanninger as Ashley
- Emma Colberti as Charlotte
- Fabien de Jomaron as Claude
- Reza Habouhossein as man in stairs

== Production ==
In an interview with the New York Post, Catherine Breillat appeared to confirm the rumors of actual on-set sex. "An actor never pretends," she said. "At the same time, I'm not perverse. I don't impose on my actors or actresses any more than is absolutely necessary. But I don't pretend. I don't simulate. The deal was, we'd go as far as we had to, as far as the film required." Caroline Ducey accepted the part of Marie knowing that 'going all the way' was written into her contract. Apparently, Ducey began the film thinking that it would also be an exit from the sexual relationship she was in, but then decided while it was being made that she wanted to stay with her boyfriend. By the end, she was in a state of considerable distress. Siffredi has said "he did go all the way", Breillat says she "was sure that he did, or 90 per cent sure anyway. But Caroline insisted that he didn't".

The film features explicit copulation scenes, especially one showing Ducey's coitus with Siffredi.

== Release and classification ==
In Europe, Romance was released mainstream; in the United States, it was reduced to a mainstream-acceptable R rating, and the European original version is unrated. In the United Kingdom, the British Board of Film Classification passed the film uncut for cinemas, though home releases suffered a brief cut to an ejaculation shot.

In March 2004, the original version was broadcast on late-night German public television. Although initially refused classification in Australia, it was eventually awarded an R18+ on appeal. It singlehandedly paved the way for actual sex to be accommodated in the R18+ classification in Australia.

In Canada, particularly in Alberta and the Maritimes, the film's explicit sexual content was seen as gratuitous and it was given an A rating and XXX rating in those regions. In June 2008, in the Netherlands, the original version was broadcast on Dutch public TV by VPRO as one of a series of Erotica arthouse cinema.

== Controversy ==
In 2024, Ducey published the autobiographical book La Prédation (nom féminin), translatable to The Predation (Feminine Noun). In it, she recounts the traumatizing sexual assault she endured during the filming, notably the staircase sexual assault scene, for which she holds Breillat responsible.

Before getting to the filming, Ducey had addressed her concerns over explicit sexual assault scenes involving simulated cunnilingus and sodomy in the script to Breillat, who brushed them off as simple context clues and plot devices to help her study the character and advance the story, and reassured the actress, that not everything on script was to be pictured on-screen. On the day of the shooting, however, Ducey was confronted by a different reality, as she learnt that the scene of the simulated act was to be shot explicitly. Breillat even asked her to take off her pantyhose and pull down her underwear to make the scene more realistic.

Ducey, trusting of Breillat, complied, and as everyone on set proceeded with the filming, the actor portraying the predator took the liberty of performing an unsimulated act of cunnilingus on her, without her consent or former notice by anyone involved with the film, including Breillat. Ducey says she felt paralyzed in her movements and speech, while she still kept a modicum of consciousness, and that she jolted back to her senses because of the sound of tape running out, before threatening the actor to stop. Ducey writes about seeing director Breillat masturbate the male actor so he could maintain an erection throughout the second take, which started right after, and was fully simulated, this time around.

Ducey claims that a clause in her contract explicitly stated that the film would under no condition be classified as pornography, and that she would not participate in any unsimulated sex scenes during the filming. Breillat, responding to these accusations, however, says while such scenes were not in her contract, the actress agreed on filming them regardless, a statement that the actress doubled down on refuting in a sit-down interview for the French short-format media and cultural news outlet Konbini.

== See also ==
- Sadism and masochism in fiction
- Unsimulated sex

== Sources ==
- Angelo, Adrienne (2010). "Sexual Cartographies: Mapping Subjectivity in the Cinema of Catherine Breillat". Journal for Cultural Research. 14 (1): 43–55. doi:10.1080/14797580903363082.
- Coulthard, Lisa (2010). "Desublimating Desire: Courtly Love and Catherine Breillat". Journal for Cultural Research. 14 (1): 57–69. doi:10.1080/14797580903363090.
- Coulthard, Lisa; Birks, Chelsea (2016). "Horrible Sex: The Sexual Relationship in New Extremism". In Coleman, L. (ed.). Sex and Storytelling in Modern Cinema: Explicit Sex, Performance and Cinematic Technique. I.B.Tauris & Co. pp. 71–94. doi:10.5040/9780755694655. ISBN 978-0-7556-9465-5.
- Gorton, Kristyn (2007). ""The Point of View of Shame": Re-viewing female desire in Catherine Breillat's Romance (1999) and Anatomy of Hell (2004)". Studies in European Cinema. 4 (2): 111–124. doi:10.1386/seci.4.2.111_1 (inactive 1 July 2025).
- Hottell, Ruth A.; Russell-Watts, Lynsey (2002). "Catherine Breillat's Romance and the Female Spectator: From Dream-Work to Therapy". L'Esprit Créateur. 42 (3): 70–80. doi:10.1353/esp.2010.0395.
- Krisjansen, Ivan; Maddock, Trevor (2001). "Educating Eros: Catherine Breillat's Romance as a Cinematic Solution to Sade's Metaphysical Problem". Studies in French Cinema. 1 (3): 141–149. doi:10.1386/sfci.1.3.141.
- Mtshali, Marya T.; Fahs, Breanne (2014). "Catherine Breillat's Romance and Anatomy of Hell : Subjectivity and the Gendering of Sexuality'". Women: A Cultural Review. 25 (2): 160–175. doi:10.1080/09574042.2014.944415.
- Phillips, John (2001). "Catherine Breillat's Romance: Hard Core and the Female Gaze". Studies in French Cinema. 1 (3): 133–140. doi:10.1386/sfci.1.3.133.
- Wheatley, Catherine (2010). "Contested Interactions: Watching Catherine Breillat's Scenes of Sexual Violence". Journal for Cultural Research. 14 (1): 27–41. doi:10.1080/14797580903363066.
- Wilson, Emma (2001). "Deforming Femininity: Catherine Breillat's Romance". In Mazdon, Lucy (ed.). France on Film: Reflections on Popular French Cinema. London: Wallflower Press. pp. 145–157. ISBN 978-1903364116.
