= Penny Baker =

American model and actress

Playboy centerfold appearance
- January 1984
- Preceded by: Terry Nihen
- Succeeded by: Justine Greiner

Personal details
- Born: October 5, 1965 (age 60) Buffalo, New York
- Height: 5 ft 8 in (1.73 m)

Penny Baker (born October 5, 1965) is an American model and actress. After being interviewed in Chicago, she was chosen as Playboy's Playmate of the Month for January 1984, the 30th Anniversary Playmate. Her photos were shot by Arny Freytag in New York City, Buffalo, and Los Angeles when she was 17, with written permission from her parents. Her pictorial was titled "Lucky Penny" and it reported her age as 18.

In 1985, she had a cameo in the movie Real Genius, appearing in the pool slide scene. In 1986, she had a role as a high-priced prostitute in The Men's Club. Baker also appeared as one of the principal ensemble cast members in the 1987 Richard Fleischer-directed screwball comedy Million Dollar Mystery.

Baker was once interviewed by the author Martin Amis. According to him, "within a minute I had run out of questions."

== Filmography ==
=== Film ===
Year	Title	Role	Notes
1977	Valentino	Lorna	Uncredited
1985	Real Genius	Ick's Girl at Party	
1986	The Men's Club	Lake	
1987	Million Dollar Mystery	Charity	

=== Television ===
Year	Title	Role	Notes
1984	Calendar Girl Murders	Calendar Girl	Television film
1984	Benson	Darlene	Episode: "The Inheritance"
1984, 1985	Mickey Spillane's Mike Hammer	Osgood's Girlfriend / Mink	2 episodes
1986	A Masterpiece of Murder	Christine Manning	Television film
1986	The Twilight Zone	Pam	Episode: "Personal Demons"

Penny Baker	Justine Greiner	Dona Speir	Lesa Ann Pedriana	Patty Duffek	Tricia Lange
Liz Stewart	Suzi Schott	Kimberly Evenson	Debi Johnson	Roberta Vasquez	Karen Velez
