= Hellé (film) =

- Directed by: Roger Vadim
- Starring: Gwen Welles
- Cinematography: Claude Renoir
- Music by: Philippe Sarde
- Release date: 1972
- Language: French

Helle is a 1972 French film directed by Roger Vadim. The film recorded admissions of 345,984 in France.

== Plot ==
Helle is an intellectually disabled, deaf and mute village girl who lives high in the Savoy mountains of France. Due to her lack of understanding of what's good or bad, the village has taken advantage of her.

Maria is a widow and has two sons, Julien and Fabrice. The eldest one, Julien, is a war veteran and his time in Vietnam has broken him. Fabrice, the youngest one, comes home for summer vacation and falls in love with Helle. Helle, in her own ways, feels for him and finds herself unable to communicate it.

Maria, who is aging, falls in love with a sleazy guy who cunningly takes her fancy car in the name of love, and he entertains her fancy over him. Julien tells Fabrice that Helle is the village's traveling "filles de joie." This unsettles Fabrice and he beats Julien out of their shack and rapes her. Julien walks back home feeling depressed and commits suicide by jumping from the top of Cascade Saint-Benoît. The next morning, on their way to Fabrice's home, Fabrice and Helle see his mother lying on the field depressed that her lover has left her. Fabrice calls Helle to follow him but seeing his love and closeness to his mother, Helle sees herself as an outsider and goes to the church where she first fell in love with Fabrice and falls in despair. However, hearing the church bell faintly, she finds herself happy and plays around like a cow by mistaking it for a cowbell.

== Cast ==
- Gwen Welles as Hellé
- Jean-Claude Bouillon as François de Marceau
- Didier Haudepin as Fabrice Fournier
- Maria Mauban as la mère de Fabrice
- Bruno Pradal as Julien Fournier
- Robert Hossein as Kleber
- Maria Schneider as Nicole
- Diane Vernon as Greta
- Georges Poujouly
- Dora Doll
- Anna Prucnal
