= New Year's Day (1989 film) =

- Directed by: Henry Jaglom
- Written by: Henry Jaglom
- Starring: David Duchovny; Maggie Wheeler; Gwen Welles; Henry Jaglom
- Cinematography: Joey Forsyte
- Distributed by: The Rainbow Company
- Release date: December 13, 1989
- Running time: 89 minutes
- Country: United States
- Language: English

New Year's Day is a 1989 American comedy-drama film written and directed by Henry Jaglom. It was entered into the main competition at the 46th Venice International Film Festival.

== Plot ==
Set entirely inside a New York City apartment on a snowy New Years Day, Drew is a recently divorced, middle-aged Hollywood writer/director who arrives back in New York looking for a path to start his life over and upon arriving at his old apartment, finds three young women residing there until the end of the day. They are the free-spirited Lucy, a multi-career woman and part-time actress who wants to move to Hollywood to start her life over; Annie is a photographer and Lucy's best friend who wants to move to L.A. with Lucy, but is unsure at what she wants to do with her life; Winona is a 30-year-old magazine editor who feels her biological clock ticking and wants to start a family. An assortment of people soon arrive at the apartment for a party where they talk amongst each other about their stance in life in which Drew sees the inspiration from the conversations on deciding to start his life over.

== Cast ==
- David Duchovny as Billy
- Maggie Wheeler as Lucy
- Gwen Welles as Annie
- Melanie Winter as Winona
- Henry Jaglom as Drew
- Miloš Forman as Lazlo
- Michael Emil as Dr. Stadthagen
- Tracy Reiner as Marjorie
- James DePreist as Lucy's shrink
