= Amour Fou (1993 film) =

- Written by: Roger Vadim
- Directed by: Roger Vadim
- Starring: Marie-Christine Barrault; Andrea Occhipinti
- Music by: Jean-marie Senia
- Country of origin: France
- Original language: French

Production
- Producers: Philippe Cottereau; Pierre Devert
- Cinematography: Pierre-William Glenn
- Running time: 100 minutes
- Production company: Anabase Production

Original release
- Release: 8 December 1993

Amour fou is a 1993 French TV movie written and directed by Roger Vadim and starring Marie-Christine Barrault.

== Cast ==
- Marie-Christine Barrault as Louise
- Andrea Occhipinti as Sacha
- Henri Virlogeux as Father Lefebvre
- Laetitla Legrix as Amelie
- Daniel Briquet as Inspector
- Claude Crule as D'Estremont
- Edith Brunner as Ema
- Sylvia Galmot
- Adrien Lacassaigne as Gendarme
- Jean-Michel Leray as Pierre
- Pierre Mezerette as Edouard
- Jean-Pierre Brigadier as Rochette
