= Night Games (1980 film) =

- Directed by: Roger Vadim
- Screenplay by: Anton Diether; Clarke Reynolds
- Story by: Anton Diether; Barth Jules Sussman
- Produced by: Andre Morgan; Roger Lewis
- Starring: Cindy Pickett; Barry Primus; Joanna Cassidy; Paul Jenkins
- Cinematography: Denis Lewiston
- Edited by: William Carruth
- Music by: John Barry
- Production companies: Pan Pacific Productions; Golden Harvest
- Distributed by: Avco Embassy Pictures (United States); ITC Entertainment (United Kingdom)
- Release date: 11 April 1980 (New York)
- Running time: 100 minutes
- Country: United States
- Language: English

Night Games is a 1980 erotic thriller film directed by Roger Vadim. It was released in France as Jeux de Nuit.

The film stars Cindy Pickett as a woman still traumatised after being raped as a teenager, and is unable to have a satisfactory sex life with her husband, who eventually leaves her. Left alone in a large house, Valerie drifts into sexual fantasies, while facing danger from another potential rapist.

Joanna Cassidy also stars, as Valerie's best friend. The film was released on CED in 1983 and VHS in 1989, with a running time of 104 minutes. A subsequent DVD release has a running time of only 96 minutes.

== Cast ==
- Cindy Pickett as Valerie St. John
- Joanna Cassidy as Julie Miller
- Barry Primus as Jason St. John
- Paul Jenkins as Sean Daniels
- Gene Davis as Timothy

== Production ==
Roger Vadim had previously made a number of provocative films, including And God Created Woman and Barbarella, whose respective stars Vadim also married, Brigitte Bardot and Jane Fonda.

He was going to make a vampire film starring an ex-girlfriend Catherine Deneuve but postponed it to make Night Games. Vadim said he was "looking for a new Vivien Leigh, about 27 years old" to star in the film.

Part of the funding came from the Philippines and some of the movie was shot there. Other funding came from Raymond Chow of Golden Harvest.

Pickett was a relative unknown when Vadim cast her for Night Games, best known for appearing for three years on Guiding Light. "I went away from the experience transformed", said Pickett. "Vadim has the power to make an actor feel so good about himself, and when that happens you grow. It's part of his magic."

Pickett later recalled:

Vadim had to fight to get me into the picture. Chow had wanted someone with long hair and a big bosom – another Bardot, presumably. And here I was with short hair and a boyish figure. Vadim had to explain that fashions had changed since the Bardot era. And in the end, Chow accepted this.

Pickett and Vadim dated during the making of the film but the relationship ended when the film did.

== Reception ==
This film was neither a commercial nor critical success, and Pickett went on to become one of the stars of an American television series set in a hospital, St. Elsewhere, and as the title character's mother in the film Ferris Bueller's Day Off.

"I was probably in every press release that year", said Pickett. " The London press was so cruel. One article ran a headline, 'Bardot, Deneuve, Fonda... Picket??'"

Pickett later reflected:

Perhaps the film would've done better if they'd used someone different – a Bo Derek for example. Because people did go to see Vadim's latest discovery and obviously I wasn't the sort of person they expected. The film was a disappointment, too. It was supposed to be a psychological thriller, but it wound up as a soft porn film. That wasn't Vadim's fault; he didn't have final cut. Many of my best scenes were cut out altogether. When I saw the finished version I knew it would do nothing for me. Nobody would walk away impressed. In fact, not many would even sit through the picture, which was a pity because my best work came at the end. I was sorry not just for myself but also for Vadim. I wanted it to work for him.

Pickett said she was never meant to be typed as a sex goddess. "I didn't have the body for it", she said.
