= Gwen Welles =

American actress (1951–1993)

- Welles in Nashville (1975)
- Born: Gwen Goldberg; March 4, 1951; Chattanooga, Tennessee, U.S.
- Died: October 13, 1993 (aged 42); Santa Monica, California, U.S.
- Education: Vassar College
- Occupation: Actress
- Years active: 1969–1993
- Spouse: Harris Yulin (m. 1975)
- Mother: Rebecca Welles

Gwen Welles (born Gwen Goldberg, March 4, 1951 – October 13, 1993) was an American actress.

== Early years ==
Gwen Welles was born March 4, 1951, in Chattanooga, Tennessee, as Gwen Goldberg. She was the daughter of clothing designer Rebecca Welles and Barton Goldberg; her sisters were Elizabeth (Betsy) Goldberg Welles and Lori Yarom. Welles attended Vassar College. When she was 17, she worked as a dress saleswoman.

== Career ==
Welles's film debut was in A Safe Place (1971). In the early 1970s, she acted in two films for Roger Vadim during three years that she spent in France. She may be best remembered for her portrayal of untalented singer Sueleen Gay in Robert Altman's 1975 film Nashville, for which she was nominated for a BAFTA Award, for Best Supporting Actress. Welles also appeared in Altman's California Split (1974), as well as several films directed by Henry Jaglom, including New Year's Day (1989) and Eating (1990), and in the Sam Kinison-hosted episode of Saturday Night Live the 15 November 1986, as the free opened girlfriend of the butch character Dr. Norma in the Love Connection sketch.

== Personal life ==
Welles was an advocate of yoga, usually meditating 20–30 minutes twice a day.

During her three years in France, she lived with Roger Vadim. She told newspaper columnist Earl Wilson, "I was very naive. I was about 20. I was so in love with him. I would sulk for two hours, I would go to pieces, if he gave me a wrong look." During her time in Paris, she posed for a set of nude photographs for a magazine to earn money to remain there another year. She also was injured in an automobile accident. She married Harris Yulin.

Welles died from colon cancer in 1993 at age 42. Donna Deitch directed An Angel on My Shoulder, a documentary about Welles' illness in 1992, which appeared at the IFC's Lesbian and Gay film festival in August 1998.

== Filmography ==
Film and television
| Year | Title | Role | Notes |
|---|---|---|---|
| 1969 | Ironside | Pam | "Up, Down and Even" |
| 1971 | A Safe Place | Bari | |
| 1972 | Hellé | Hellé | |
| 1973 | Hit! | Sherry Nielson | |
| 1974 | California Split | Susan Peters | |
| 1975 | Nashville | Sueleen Gay | |
| 1977 | Between the Lines | Laura | |
| 1977 | Baretta | Vicki | "Somebody Killed Cock Robin" |
| 1983 | Star 80 | Leann | Uncredited |
| 1983 | Fantasy Island | Mitzi | 1 episode |
| 1984 | An All Consuming Passion | Joylee | Video |
| 1985 | Desert Hearts | Gwen | |
| 1986 | Nobody's Fool | Shirley | |
| 1986 | Saturday Night Live | Zena, Dr. Norma Hoeffering's girlfriend | Ep. "Sam Kinison/Lou Reed" |
| 1986 | The Men's Club | Redhead | |
| 1988 | Sticky Fingers | Marcie | |
| 1989 | New Year's Day | Annie | |
| 1990 | Eating | Sophie | |
| 1991 | The Disco Years | Melissa | Short |
