= Paul Jenkins (actor) =

American actor (1938–2013)

- Jenkins as Tom Jenkins in The Secrets of Isis, 1975
- Born: August 2, 1938; Philadelphia, Pennsylvania, U.S.
- Died: July 1, 2013 (aged 74); Los Angeles, California, U.S.
- Occupation: Actor
- Years active: 1968–2005
- Known for: The Waltons; Dynasty
- Spouse: Sally Kemp

Paul R. Jenkins (August 2, 1938 – July 1, 2013) was an American actor. He appeared in films such as Network and Chinatown, and also single appearances in television shows such as M*A*S*H, Columbo, Lou Grant, Kojak, The Partridge Family, and Starsky & Hutch. He appeared three times in the television series The Rockford Files over the course of its six-season run, playing a different character each time.

Jenkins is also known for roles such as Professor Parks in The Waltons and as Eddie in Dynasty.

== Biography ==
Jenkins was born in Philadelphia, Pennsylvania in 1938. He decided to become an actor after deciding he had no vocation to the priesthood, and, while living in New York City, began performing roles in theater. He made his film debut in 1968, playing a bit role in Roman Polanski's thriller Rosemary's Baby. He soon turned to a career in television, where he found roles in daytime dramas such as The Secret Storm and Love of Life.

Eventually, he began to find employment in television sitcoms and dramas as minor or recurring characters. Jenkins would spend most of his career in television, where he portrayed a wide variety of characters, from attorneys to priests and policemen. He appeared in over 40 television series during his career, mostly during the 1970s. Jenkins' most notable roles were that of Professor Parks in the American drama series The Waltons and Eddie in the soap opera series Dynasty. His role as Parks lasted from 1974 to 1976, where he would appear in five episodes of the series. His role as Eddie lasted one year, and he appeared in six episodes of the series.

He also appeared as a trucker in the episode "Dead Run" of The Twilight Zone, and had guest appearances in Night Gallery and Walker, Texas Ranger. He portrayed a different character in each of his three appearances in The Rockford Files.

Jenkins had moderate success with his stage career, which he initially planned to pursue instead of a film or television career. He performed in productions of The Great White Hope and had a starring role as McMurphy in a 1970 off-Broadway tour of One Flew Over the Cuckoo's Nest. Jenkins also co-wrote and starred in a one-man show called A Journey for Eden, based on the life of author Jack London. Jenkins also directed an actor's school in Portsmouth, New Hampshire, where he would coach and work with actors such as Rip Torn, Shelley Winters, Jessie Andrews, Gene Wilder, and other members of the organization.

For his movie career, Jenkins reunited with Roman Polanski in 1974 for a role as a policeman in Chinatown. He had a brief role in the Academy Award-winning film Network, where he played a studio assistant. Jenkins also appeared in the 1980 film Night Games as Sean Daniels, in one of his few main roles; the 1984 film Hard to Hold; and the 1992 film Sneakers.

Jenkins' career continued into the 1990s and 2000s, though he would not appear in the same number of roles he had in the 1970s or 1980s. He retired from acting in 2005, with his last acting credit being as Father Pat McGuire in a second season episode of Cold Case.

== Death ==
Jenkins died at the age of 74 on July 1, 2013, following a brief illness.

== Filmography ==
Film
| Year | Title | Role | Notes |
|---|---|---|---|
| 1971 | The Organization | Tony | |
| 1972 | One Is a Lonely Number | James Brower | |
| 1974 | Chinatown | Policeman #1 | |
| 1976 | Network | TV Stage Manager | |
| 1977 | I Never Promised You a Rose Garden | Dr. Royston | |
| 1980 | Night Games | Sean Daniels | |
| 1984 | Hard to Hold | Hawker | |
| 1992 | Sneakers | Playtronics Lobby Guard - Night | |
