= The Men's Club =

1986 film by Peter Medak

- Directed by: Peter Medak
- Screenplay by: Leonard Michaels
- Based on: The Men's Club; 1981 novel by Leonard Michaels
- Produced by: Howard Gottfried
- Starring: David Dukes; Richard Jordan; Harvey Keitel; Frank Langella; Roy Scheider; Craig Wasson; Treat Williams; Stockard Channing; Gina Gallego; Cindy Pickett; Gwen Welles; Penny Baker; Rebeccah Bush; Claudia Cron; Ann Dusenberry; Marilyn Jones; Manette La Chance; Jennifer Jason Leigh; Ann Wedgeworth
- Cinematography: John Fleckenstein
- Edited by: Bill Butler; David Dresher; Cynthia Scheider
- Music by: Lee Holdridge
- Production company: Atlantic Entertainment Group
- Distributed by: Ascot Video; Atlantic Releasing Corporation
- Release date: September 19, 1986
- Running time: 101 minutes
- Country: United States
- Language: English
- Box office: $2,556,361

The Men's Club is a 1986 American drama film directed by Peter Medak, based on the novel of the same name by Leonard Michaels. It stars Roy Scheider, Harvey Keitel, Frank Langella, Treat Williams, David Dukes, Craig Wasson, and Richard Jordan.

== Plot ==
A band of friends go on a drunken, all-night spree, spending a night in a high-class San Francisco brothel.

== Cast ==
- David Dukes as Phillip
- Richard Jordan as Kramer
- Harvey Keitel as Solly Berliner
- Frank Langella as Harold Canterbury
- Roy Scheider as Cavanaugh
- Craig Wasson as Paul
- Treat Williams as Terry
- Stockard Channing as Nancy
- Gina Gallego as Felicia
- Cindy Pickett as Hannah
- Gwen Welles as Redhead
- Penny Baker as Lake
- Rebeccah Bush as Stella
- Claudia Cron as Stacey
- Ann Dusenberry as Page
- Marilyn Jones as Allison
- Manette LaChance as Billy
- Jennifer Jason Leigh as Teensy
- Ann Wedgeworth as Jo
- Laurie Ambert as Waitress
- Joan Foley as Nurse
- Kelly Haverur as Phoebe
- Helen Shaver as Sarah (uncredited)
