= Cindy Pickett =

American actress

- Born: Cindy Lou Pickett; April 18, 1947 (age 79); Norman, Oklahoma, U.S.
- Occupation: Actress
- Years active: 1976–present
- Spouse: Lyman Ward (m. 1986; div. 1992)
- Children: 2

Cindy Lou Pickett (born April 18, 1947) is an American actress. She is known for her 1970s role as Jackie Marler-Spaulding on the CBS soap Guiding Light and Dr. Carol Novino on the television drama St. Elsewhere in the 1980s. Pickett, however, is best known to audiences for her lighter turn as Katie Bueller, Ferris Bueller's loving and unsuspecting mother, in the 1986 American comedy movie Ferris Bueller's Day Off.

Other notable cinematic roles and performances include Valerie St. John, the leading role in Roger Vadim's 1980 film, Jeux de Nuit / Night Games, and the heroic, tough-as-nails Dr. Diane Norris, executive officer of the under-siege, deep-sea scientific research station in the 1989 sci-fi-horror film DeepStar Six.

== Early life and education ==
Born on April 18, 1947, in Norman, Oklahoma (Note: Where her father was then completing his junior year at the University of Oklahoma College of Fine Arts.) and raised in Sand Springs, Oklahoma and Houston, Texas, Pickett is the daughter of Millie and Cecil J. Pickett (the latter an influential drama teacher/director at Bellaire High School, Houston Baptist College and the University of Houston). In Houston, Pickett attended Jane Long Junior High School and Bellaire High School; next came Jacksonville's Lon Morris College—under the tutelage of another widely revered Texas-based teacher-director, LMC drama department founder Lula Pearson—and the University of Texas at Austin. Returning home, Pickett attended Houston Baptist College and the University of Houston, once again studying with—and being directed by—her father, as well as performing in a repertory company alongside similarly Hollywood-bound classmates such as Randy Quaid, Trey Wilson, and Brent Spiner (then Brent Mintz).

== Career ==
Pickett made a major departure from her soap opera image when she played the central role in the 1980 erotic film Jeux de Nuit / Night Games, directed by Roger Vadim. It was a sexually charged role involving numerous nude scenes, however the film went unnoticed and did not boost Pickett's career. In the 1981 mystery/crime drama Margin for Murder, Pickett played the role of Velda, Mike Hammer's (Kevin Dobson) loyal and devoted secretary. She played "Jackie Marler" on the soap opera The Guiding Light from 1976 to 1980, "Vanessa Sarnac" on the ABC weekly TV series Call to Glory from 1984 to 1985, and she appeared as Dr. Carol Novino on the hospital drama TV series St. Elsewhere from 1986 to 1988.

Pickett had a supporting role in the 1987 mini-series Amerika, which she then considered to be her "best part and the best showcase" she ever had. In 1991, she played the part of Addy Mathewson in the TV movie/pilot Plymouth, which at the time was considered to be one of the most expensive such movies ever made. Pickett portrayed the real-life Kay Stayner, the mother of a boy who was kidnapped for several years, in the dramatic TV movie I Know My First Name Is Steven. TV series she has guest-starred on include Riptide, Simon & Simon, Magnum, P.I., L.A. Law, Murder, She Wrote, The Pretender, NYPD Blue, CSI: Miami, Without a Trace, Crossing Jordan and Burn Notice.

== Personal life ==
While studying at Lon Morris college, Pickett dated actor Brent Spiner. Pickett met Lyman Ward when they played the parents of the titular teenaged protagonist in the 1986 comedy film Ferris Bueller's Day Off. They married in real life and divorced in 1992. Pickett is a collector of stereopticon cards.

== Filmography ==
=== Film ===
Year	Title	Role	Notes
1980	Night Games	Valerie St. John	
1981	Circle of Power	Lyn Nilsson	
1983	Hysterical	Kate	
1986	Ferris Bueller's Day Off	Katie Bueller	
1986	The Men's Club	Hannah	
1988	Hot to Trot	Victoria Peyton	
1989	DeepStar Six	Diane Norris	
1991	Crooked Hearts	Jill	
1992	Original Intent	Marguerite	Video
1992	Sleepwalkers	Helen Robertson	
1993	Son in Law	Connie Warner	
1993	The Goodbye Bird	Sharon Phillips	
1995	Evolver	Melanie Baxter	
1996	Kid Cop	Beverly Dwerkin	Video
1996	Coyote Summer	Maggie Foster	
1997	Painted Hero	Sadie	
2000	The Stepdaughter	Maggie Conner	Video
2005	Hate Crime	Barbara McCoy	
2008	The Village Barbershop	Josie	
2010	Confession	Greta	
2011	Mother Country	Pamela Dupree	
2016	Chasing the Rain	Bonnie	
2016	Like a Butterfly	Wendy	Short
2016	White Wings	Janice	Short
2016	Confession	Julie Warren	Short
2016	Te Ata	Miss Davis	
2017	Opus of an Angel	Sister Monica	Post-production
20??	Rose	Karen	Post-production

=== Television ===
Year	Title	Role	Notes
1976–1980	Guiding Light	Jackie Marler-Spaulding	TV series
1980	The Ivory Ape	Lil Tyler	TV film
1981	Margin for Murder	Velda	TV film
1981	The Cherokee Trail	Mary Breydon	TV film
1982	Cry for the Strangers	Elaine Russell	TV film
1983	Cocaine and Blue Eyes	Catherine Anatole	TV film
1983	Bring 'Em Back Alive	Laura Davies	"Bones of Contention"
1984	Riptide	Natalie Kramer	"Somebody's Killing the Great Geeks of America"
1984	Simon & Simon	Addie Becker	"The Dillinger Print"
1984	Magnum, P.I.	Karen Teal	"Dream a Little Dream"
1984–1985	Call to Glory	Vanessa Sarnac	Main role
1986	Alfred Hitchcock Presents	Marcia Loomis	"The Gloating Place"
1986–1988	St. Elsewhere	Dr. Carol Novino	Main role
1987	Amerika	Amanda Bradford	TV miniseries
1987	Echoes in the Darkness	Sue Myers	TV film
1987	Into the Homeland	Rye Swallow	TV film
1989	I Know My First Name Is Steven	Kay Stayner	TV miniseries
1990	ABC Afterschool Special	Joanne Kelly	"A Question About Sex"
1991	Plymouth	Addy Matthewson	TV film
1991	Our Shining Moment	Betty McGuire	TV film
1992	Wild Card	Dana	TV film
1992	L.A. Law	Lois Alner	"Love on the Rox"
1994	Murder, She Wrote	Joanna Sims	"Wheel of Death"
1995	Sirens	Pam Dunbridge	"The Witness"
1995	Not Our Son	Margaret Keller	TV film
1995	Her Hidden Truth	Laney Devereaux	TV film
1996	The Making of a Hollywood Madam	Elissa Fleiss	TV film
1996	Time Well Spent	Barbara Marks	TV film
1997	The Pretender	Dr. Shafton	"Unhappy Landings"
1998	Atomic Dog	Jennifer Yates	TV film
1998–1999	Hyperion Bay	Marjorie Sweeney	Main role
2001	The Huntress	Gina Thorson	"The Two Mrs. Thorsons: Part 1"
2004	Crossing Jordan	Laura Corday	"Dead in the Water"
2005	NYPD Blue	Francine Beckett	"La Bomba"
2005	CSI: Miami	Miranda Lewis	"Whacked"
2006	McBride: Fallen Idol	Tracy Franks	TV film
2006	Ghost Whisperer	Marybeth Kaminsky	"The Woman of His Dreams"
2007	Cold Case	Sara Lowell / Johanna Kimball	"Blood on the Tracks"
2007	Medium	Tanya King	"1-900-Lucky"
2008	Burn Notice	Diane	"Trust Me"
2010	Elf Sparkle and the Special Red Dress	Snowball (voice)	TV film
2013	My Synthesized Life	Louise Bales	"Meet the Parents"
2014	The Mentalist	Rachel	"Black Helicopters"
2014	Stranded in Paradise	Mona Nelson	TV film
2016	Outcast	Lauren	"Close to Home"
2017	Age of the Living Dead	Amanda	TV series
20??	Star Trek Equinox: The Night of Time	Adm. Gray	TV film, filming
