= Bonheur, impair et passe =

- Directed by: Roger Vadim
- Based on: a play by Francoise Sagan
- Starring: Danielle Darrieux
- Release date: 1977
- Language: French

Bonheur, impair et passe is a 1977 French television film directed by Roger Vadim starring Danielle Darrieux.

It was based on a play by Francoise Sagan.

== Plot ==
Angora, a ruined Russian princess, is married to Igor, who, since she deceived him fifteen years ago, disdains her. When Wladimir arrives at her home, everything shatters.

== Cast ==
- Danielle Darrieux as Countess Deverine
- Ludmila Mikaël as Angora
- Philippe Léotard as Igor
- François Marthouret as Wladimir
- Jean-François Balmer as Ladislas
- Roger Desmare as Katov
