= Amerika (miniseries) =

1987 American television miniseries

- Written by: Donald Wrye
- Directed by: Donald Wrye
- Starring: Kris Kristofferson; Robert Urich; Wendy Hughes; Sam Neill; Cindy Pickett; Dorian Harewood; Armin Mueller-Stahl; Richard Bradford; Ivan Dixon; Marcel Hillaire; Ford Rainey; Graham Beckel; Reiner Schöne; Mariel Hemingway; Christine Lahti
- Theme music composer: Basil Poledouris
- Country of origin: United States
- Original language: English
- No. of episodes: 7

Production
- Executive producer: Donald Wrye
- Producers: John Lugar; Richard L. O'Connor
- Cinematography: Hiro Narita
- Editors: Craig Bassett; Raja Gosnell; Dan Harville; Jacque Elaine Toberen; Martin Cohen; Frank Mazzola; Michael Ripps
- Running time: 870 minutes
- Production company: ABC Circle Films
- Budget: US $40 million (est.)

Original release
- Network: ABC
- Release: February 15 – February 22, 1987

Amerika is an American television miniseries that was broadcast in 1987 on ABC. The miniseries inspired a novelization entitled Amerika: The Triumph of the American Spirit. Amerika starred Kris Kristofferson, Mariel Hemingway, Sam Neill, Robert Urich, Christine Lahti, Cindy Pickett, and a 17-year-old Lara Flynn Boyle in her first major role. Amerika was about life in the United States after a bloodless takeover engineered by the Soviet Union. Not wanting to depict the actual takeover, ABC Entertainment president, Brandon Stoddard, set the miniseries ten years after the event, focusing on the demoralized U.S. people a decade after the Soviet conquest. The intent, he later explained, was to explore the U.S. spirit under such conditions, not to portray the conflict of the Soviet coup.

Described in promotional materials as "the most ambitious American miniseries ever created", Amerika aired for 14 1/2 hours (including commercials) over seven nights (beginning February 15, 1987), and reportedly cost $40 million to produce. The miniseries was filmed in Ontario, Canada, in the Golden Horseshoe and southwestern Ontario cities of Toronto, London, and Hamilton, as well as various locations in Nebraska – most notably the small town of Tecumseh, which served as "Milford", the fictional setting for most of the series. Donald Wrye was the executive producer, director, and writer of Amerika, while composer Basil Poledouris scored the miniseries, ultimately recording (with the Hollywood Symphony Orchestra) eight hours of music – the equivalent of four feature films.

== Genesis ==
Amerika has an indirect connection to another notable ABC program, the 1983 television film The Day After, which some critics felt was too pacifist for portraying the doctrine of nuclear deterrence as pointless. Stoddard cited a column in the Los Angeles Herald-Examiner by Nixon speechwriter (and later, television personality) Ben Stein that appeared a few weeks before The Day After aired. Stein wrote, in part:

since my dear friends at ABC-TV have made a TV movie very rightly describing the terror of an atomic attack on America, perhaps they might consider something else. Perhaps they might make a TV movie about why the people of the United States face such a dreadful risk. They might make a movie about what life in the United States would be like if we lived under Soviet domination. Here is the idea: Let's have a movie called "In Red America." It would be about a few days or weeks in the life of several American families after the Soviet Union had taken over America.

Stoddard acknowledged that Stein's remarks provided the inspiration for the series. Stein received a quitclaim fee for the idea and otherwise was not involved in the production of Amerika. Originally envisioned as a four-hour made-for-TV movie entitled Topeka, Kansas, U.S.S.R., the project soon was expanded into a miniseries.

== Plot ==
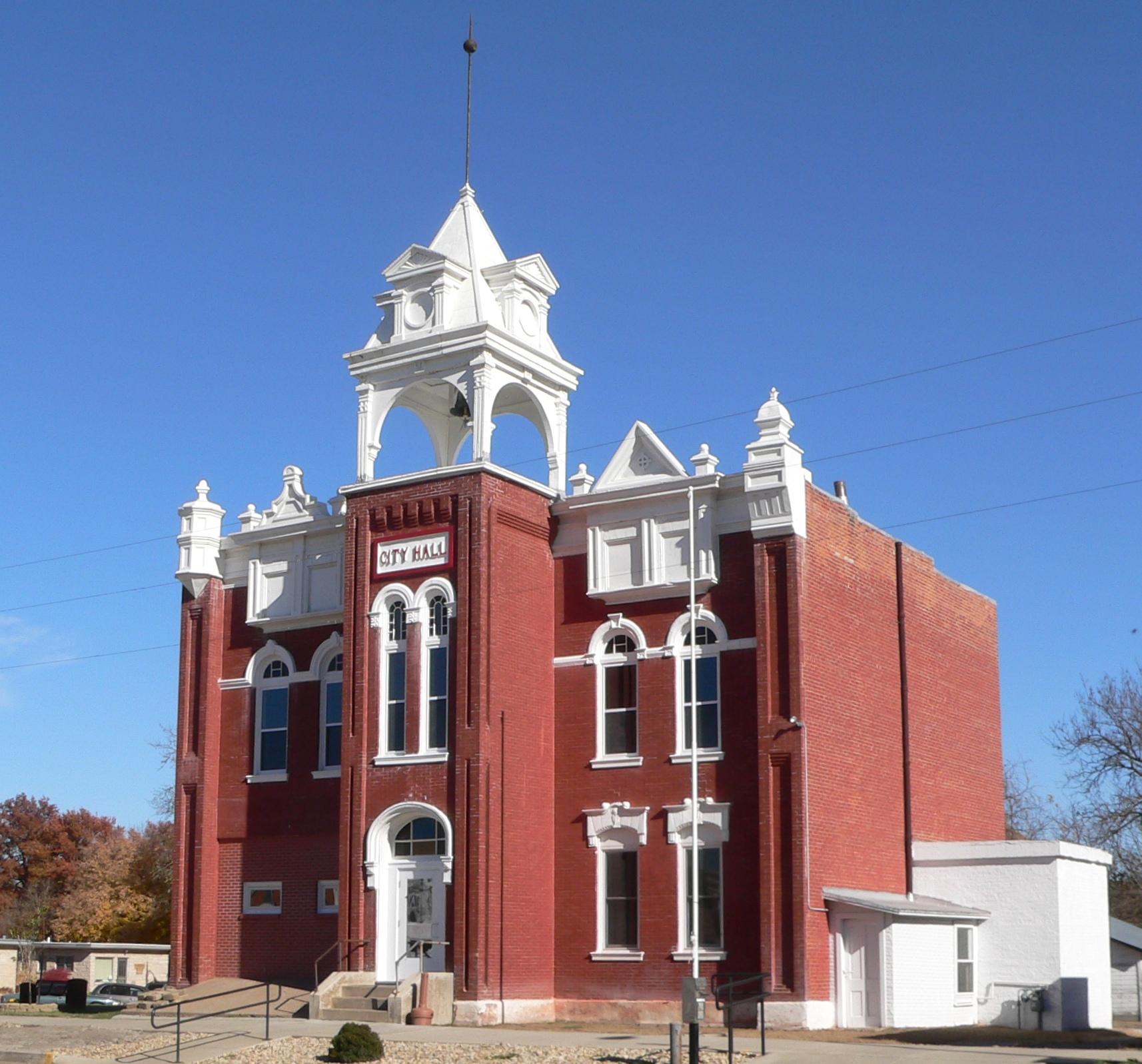
The city hall and downtown area of Tecumseh, Nebraska, served as the fictional Milford, Nebraska.

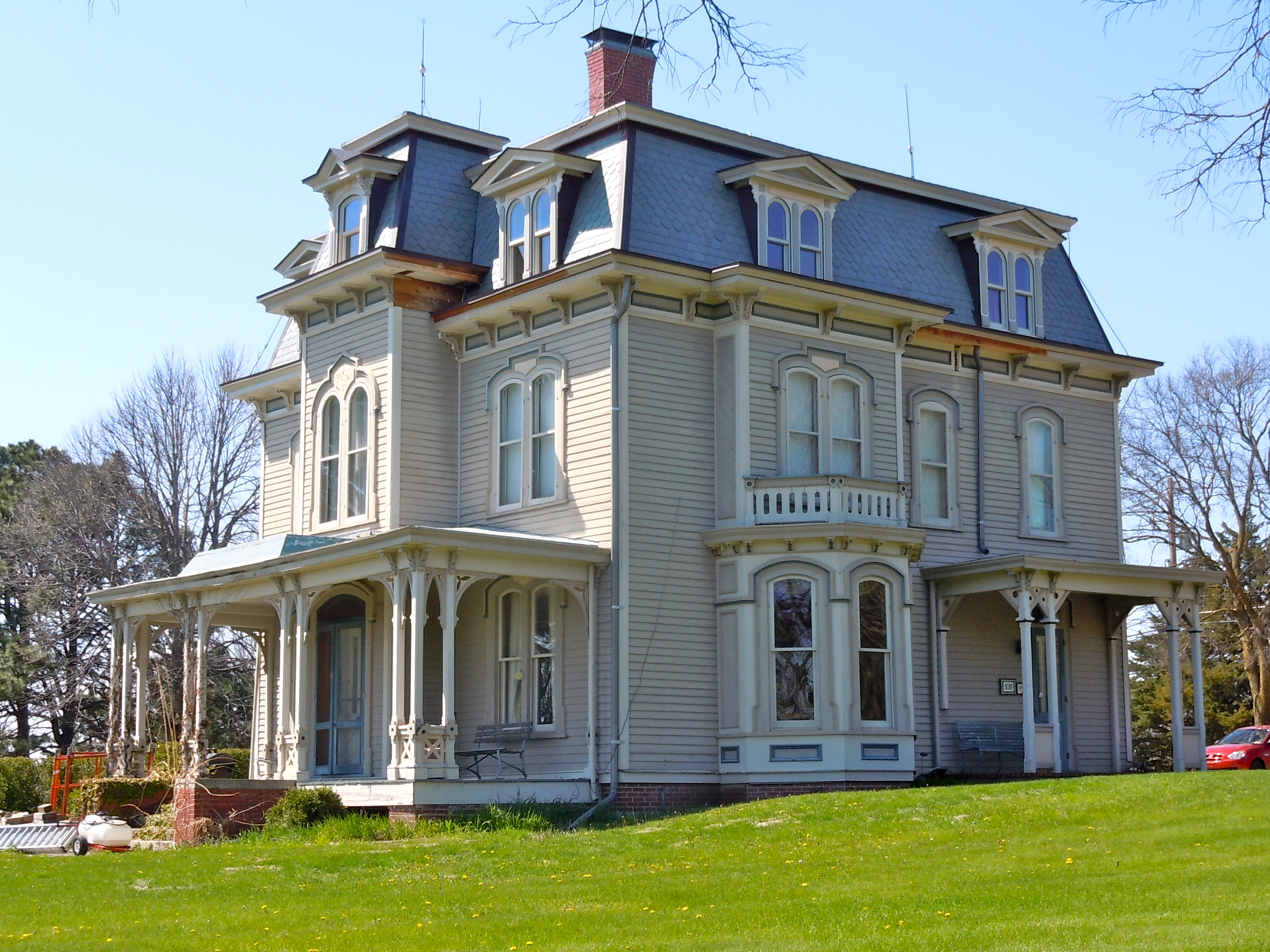
The John Cattle Jr.-Hughes Mansion in Seward, Nebraska, served as the Bradford home in Milford.

=== Major characters ===
The storyline of Amerika primarily follows three political leaders:

- Devin Milford (played by Kris Kristofferson): a maverick politician before the Soviet occupation who ran for president in 1988 (in the novel, 1992), after the Soviet takeover began. Milford was placed in a prison camp for daring to speak the truth about the Soviet conquest; at the beginning of the miniseries, Devin is declared "rehabilitated" and released back into society into the custody of his father, who lives in the Nebraska county run by Peter Bradford.
- Colonel Andrei Denisov of the KGB (played by Sam Neill): the Soviet administrator for the American Central Administrative Area. He is romantically involved with actress Kimberly Ballard (played by Mariel Hemingway). Andrei's superior and mentor is General Petya Samanov (played by Armin Mueller-Stahl), the Soviet military leader who has been in charge of Soviet occupation of the United States for the past ten years.
- Peter Bradford (played by Robert Urich): a county administrator in Nebraska who cooperates with the Soviets to create a better life for his community. He attracts the attention of the Soviet leadership because, while cooperative, he is independent and respected by his constituents. At the series' climax, the Soviets carve a new country called "Heartland" out of the Midwest, with Bradford as its "governor-general".

Major female characters, in addition to Ballard, include Peter Bradford's wife, Amanda (played by Cindy Pickett), Devin Milford's ex-wife, Marion (played by Wendy Hughes), and most notably, Devin's sister Alethea (played by Christine Lahti), who at the outset is prostituting herself to the local occupation leader. "Alethea is the center", noted Donald Wrye. "She is a metaphor for America – not just phonically – and it is she who discovers her moral core through(out) the course of the series." Lara Flynn Boyle played Bradford's teenage daughter, Jackie.

The human drama of these characters intersects with the political intrigue of the Soviet plans for the breakup of the United States. Bradford, the pragmatist, clashes with Milford, the idealist; Bradford's wife is Milford's ex-girlfriend, who finds she still has feelings for Milford upon his release from the prison camp; Denisov appoints Milford's ex-wife, a powerful magistrate (and General Samanov's mistress), to serve as Bradford's deputy and assistant in Heartland; and Kimberly's renewed sense of U.S. pride ultimately affects her relationship with Denisov.

=== Backstory ===
Towards the end of the 1980s, as the decline of the Soviet Union puts it in danger of losing the Cold War, the Soviet leadership makes a desperate gamble to rearrange the global balance of power. Four large thermonuclear weapons are detonated in the ionosphere over the United States. The resulting electromagnetic pulse (or EMP) destroys the nation's communications and computer systems, cripples the U.S. electrical grid, and affects any equipment that relies on computer technology, such as most late-model automobiles. With its ICBMs inoperative—and the National Command Authority unable to contact U.S. military forces abroad or their foreign allies in western Europe to launch a counterattack—the U.S. is forced to accept Soviet terms for surrender: unilateral disarmament, the end of the dollar as a reserve currency, and integration into the Soviet military/economic bloc. The United States quickly falls under Soviet military occupation under the command of Russian General Petya Samanov, with the President and Congress becoming mere figureheads for their Soviet overseers. Communications between the administrative areas have been cut off, and the damage to the electrical grid caused by the EMP attack has never been fully repaired.

The above events are implied in the miniseries, although never directly explained. The description is taken from the novelization of the miniseries, Amerika: The Triumph of the American Spirit by Brauna E. Pouns and Donald Wrye (Pocket Books, 1987), based on Wrye's screenplay.

=== Geopolitical situation ===
In 1997, a decade after its defeat, the contiguous United States is occupied by a United Nations peacekeeping force, the United Nations Special Service Unit (UNSSU), composed primarily of Eastern Bloc forces. The UNSSU garrison in Milford is under a command of an officer from East Germany, Major Helmut Gurtman (played by Reiner Schöne). UNSSU troops periodically engage in destructive combined arms training exercises which are deliberately intimidating to the local population.

Those Americans who engage in dissent are stripped of their privileges and sent to exile camps, where they are anathema to the Soviets and their fellow citizens. Association and communication with the exiles is forbidden, although some risk their own remaining freedoms by offering humanitarian aid. Production quotas have been imposed, and foodstuffs rationed, with the surplus being shipped to the Soviet Union.

Against this background, Bradford ascends to the leadership as governor-general of Heartland. He acts the part of a collaborator, hoping to reform the Soviet occupation from within with ideals of the old United States. Milford is released from the prison camp, hoping to be reunited with his children and fight to end the occupation and restore the United States. Denisov hopes to "salvage as much as possible" of the old U.S., while realizing that the U.S. essentially must cease to exist as a nation in order to appease the Soviet Union's leadership.

=== Climax and resolution ===
The Soviet leaders of the occupation are faced with the dual problem of keeping the U.S. pacified and convincing the Politburo that their fears of a revitalized U.S. are unfounded because the country can no longer pose a threat. The Politburo is not convinced, and considers exploding nuclear weapons on the American capital of Washington, D.C. and also over several unnamed U.S. cities as a warning to the subjugated Americans and to the world. Samanov and Andrei Denisov, both of whom want Soviet control of the United States to be relatively humane, are horrified by this idea.

At great personal risk, Petya Samanov convinces the Soviet leadership in the Kremlin in Moscow to accept an agreeable compromise plan. The United States will be divided into "satellite states" such as Heartland; the Politburo accepts the plan on the condition that the members of both the United States House of Representatives and the United States Senate will be summarily executed. This avoids the possibility of a trial taking place in Washington similar to the Nuremberg trials that took place decades earlier at the end of World War II, long before the Soviet occupation of the former United States. Such a trial will proceed either by a court of law or by a Soviet military tribunal being appointed by the Central Committee in Moscow making a strenuous journey to travel to the former U.S. capital city to preside over such a trial. This is mostly due to their fears that Congress has been galvanizing the American people to rise against their Soviet overlords. Under strict instructions to Samanov by Moscow, the planned operation will only be carried out if the United States Congress refuses to agree to dissolve the nation's government and relinquishes its federal authority and power to the new independent and regional countries in North America. Then afterwards without any resistance or any actions of rebellion they would gladly disperse, and return home in peace. If they comply, the lives of both chambers of Congress will be spared.

After the vice president, the speaker of the House of Representatives and both members of the House and Senate of Congress gather in the House of Representatives chamber, Samanov arrives at the United States Capitol Building with his senior Soviet ranking officers, Soviet military aides, and members of his military staff, along with members of the KGB who secretly surround and enter the building. He then addresses the assembled Congress and asks them to disband their legislative body in a peaceful and orderly manner, dissolve the United States government, and relinquish their power and authority to the Soviet-occupied administrative areas; the members angrily refuse to do so with and through united resistance. After seeing their true colors and a sign of potential rebellion, Samanov becomes angry and agitated by their refusal and he abruptly walks and storms out of the House of Representatives chamber. Shortly afterwards, the House of Representatives chamber's doors are locked and bolted, with no way of escape for the legislators, his men from the KGB begin firing into the entire crowd of legislators within the gallery. All members of both chambers of Congress are killed in the attack, along with the speaker of the House of Representatives, the vice president, and presumably the president pro tempore of the United States Senate. Fearing the symbolic artwork in the rotunda will inspire future Americans to rise up and take up arms in the future against the Soviet occupation of the former United States, Samanov's men are also instructed by him and his superiors in Moscow to destroy the paintings, the sculptures, and other works of art of American history and culture in the rotunda of the Capitol Building. They do so by dumping sulphuric acid, gasoline, and inflammable liquid substances all over it. The whole inside of the rotunda is set ablaze, with the whole building being engulfed by the fire and the ceiling and top of the rotunda destroyed by the Soviet-made explosives. After the act is carried out, Samanov surveys the damage and all of the dead bodies of all the members of Congress. He then sits in the House of Representatives chamber that was spared by the fire and commits suicide. Hours later, all that is left of the Capitol Building is ash and charred ruins. What happened to the President of the United States, all of the nine justices of the Supreme Court of the United States, the Joint Chiefs of Staff and the others in the presidential line of succession remains unknown.

In the final episode of the miniseries, Heartland has seceded from the United States, with other regions to follow within the next few weeks. Instead, Heartland soldiers and local militia attack the local UNSSU compound. There is talk of a "Second American Revolution" that could undermine the Soviet Union's plans to break up the United States and end the Soviet occupation of America itself. The miniseries ends on a downbeat note, Devin Milford is shown about to make a nationwide speech telling Americans to revolt against the Soviet occupation; however, Milford is shot to death. It is unclear if he managed to make a nationwide broadcast calling on Americans to resist the breakup of the United States, but based on the ending, it appears that the United States of America will cease to exist forever as a nation and will be broken up into several independent countries within North America, at least for now. With the suspicion from Denisov himself of the hope of a Second American Revolutionary War that could restore American independence and drive the Soviets along with their military, air, and naval forces from the shores of the former United States of America in the future, it now lies in the hands of a 14-year-old boy, Devin Milford's eldest son William Milford, when one day he comes of age.

=== The Divided States of America ===
In this fictional timeline, the U.S. Congress divided the United States into multiple Soviet occupied "administrative areas" in 1988, one year after the communist takeover. These areas are intended to become polities modeled on the Soviet republics, joined in a new North American Union. A map shown on screen reveals these administrative areas to be:

- California Special District: California, Nevada
- Western Semi-Autonomous: Colorado, Idaho, Montana, Utah, Wyoming
- Northwest: Oregon, Washington
- Southwest: Arizona, New Mexico
- North Central: Minnesota, North Dakota, South Dakota, Wisconsin, and the Upper Peninsula of Michigan.
- Central: Illinois, Iowa, Kansas, Missouri, Nebraska (this is Peter Bradford's administrative area, and the territory which eventually becomes Heartland, with Omaha, Nebraska, as its capital)
- South Central: Arkansas, Louisiana, Oklahoma, Texas
- Southern: Alabama, Florida, Georgia, Mississippi
- Mid-Atlantic: Delaware, Maryland, North Carolina, South Carolina, Virginia
- Appalachia: Kentucky, Tennessee, West Virginia
- Ameritech: Indiana, the Lower Peninsula of Michigan, Ohio, Pennsylvania (presumably named after the phone company that serviced these areas)
- Northeastern: Connecticut, Maine, Massachusetts, New Hampshire, New Jersey, New York, Rhode Island, Vermont

In addition to these areas, Washington, D.C. comprises its own National Administrative District, South Florida is described by a character as the "Space Zone", and there is a passing reference to three "International Cities", one of which is San Francisco. Michigan is separated into two administrative regions, with the Lower Peninsula belonging to Ameritech, and the Upper Peninsula belonging to the North Central region. Alaska is described as never having been pacified, requiring continued engagement by Soviet troops, and there are pockets of armed resistance in the Rocky Mountains and in West Virginia. There is no mention of what has happened to Hawaii, or to U.S. territories such as Puerto Rico, Guam, and American Samoa (even though Puerto Rico and the U.S. Virgin Islands may have presumably been taken over by the "Greater Cuba", led by Fidel Castro).

The Rust Belt (presumably "Ameritech") faces its own special problems. Most of its advanced factory equipment was removed at the start of the occupation and taken to the Soviet Union. The region suffers 50% unemployment as a result, and its residents are not permitted to leave, except to volunteer for factory work in the Soviet Union, from which no one has yet returned.

Travel and communications between the various zones is heavily restricted, part of the "divide and conquer" plan of the Soviet occupation.

=== Communist occupation elsewhere ===
Both the novel and miniseries imply that the Soviet Union has conquered other countries after the U.S. coup (it can be surmised, for example, that the EMP which disabled U.S. technology also would have crippled Canada and Mexico, a minor character says that he and his wife fled East Germany for the United States and remarked that "the promised land [had] become worse than what [they] left", and Denisov says at one point that "we control most of the world").

In this new world, Fidel Castro heads what is now called "Greater Cuba", embracing most of the Caribbean and Latin America, and Taiwan has been absorbed into China. North Korea has conquered South Korea and Korea is united under communist rule. A politician named "Mbele" heads the "Socialist Republic of Southern Africa" which also includes South Africa, "Barghout" is the leader of "Iraqistan" which includes present-day Israel and all of the Arab world in both the Middle East and North Africa. Eastern Europe is in a state of unrest, echoing the turmoil in the former United States. The Soviet leader mentions being stationed in England before being posted in America, implying that Western Europe is also under Soviet control, much like America.

=== National symbols ===
The flag of the occupation is the pale blue United Nations flag, with crossed U.S. and Soviet flags superimposed on the sides. The U.S. flag is shown without its stars, and this flag is displayed during the "Lincoln Week" ceremonies. The standard U.S. flag is outlawed, although one scene shows a group of war veterans marching with the old U.S. flag upside down, this being a distress signal. The U.S. national anthem, "The Star-Spangled Banner", also is outlawed, but this does not stop a group of citizens from singing it (haltingly at first) after the "Lincoln Week" parade.

Abraham Lincoln is included with Karl Marx and Vladimir Lenin in propaganda. One of the signature scenes in the film is a twenty-minute, dialogue-free depiction of the celebration of "Lincoln Week" (a holiday replacing the Fourth of July), with both Lincoln and Lenin displayed on red banners that were most likely intended to be striking and startling to television audiences of the time.

A new pledge of allegiance is given by "rehabilitated" political prisoners upon release from the U.S. gulags. While the prisoners are told that they are free to refuse to make this pledge, the circumstances under which it is administered suggest otherwise. The pledge states:

I pledge my allegiance to the flag of the community of American, Soviet, and United Nations of the World, and to the principle for which it stands – a nation, indivisible with others of the Earth, joined in peace, and justice for all.

== Critical reception ==
Amerika received mixed reviews; the series created controversy with some. Certain critics and viewers felt it was too long and unrealistic, others argued that it would be damaging to Soviet-American relations, and a spokesperson for the United Nations objected to it being portrayed as an occupying force under Soviet control. Some conservatives felt that Soviet brutality was greatly underplayed; conversely, a number of liberals dismissed the entire miniseries as right-wing paranoia. At various points, the program was scrapped, delayed, and rewritten. Prior to the show's airing, several left-wing magazines, including The Nation, The Progressive, Tikkun and Mother Jones carried articles strongly criticizing Amerika. The American Friends Service Committee also protested against Amerika. Journalist Christopher Hitchens, when encouraged by a caller on a February 1987 C-SPAN talk show to view the series, commented "I bet you you don't get through to the end of it. It's a boring idiotic piece of nonsensical propaganda. No one will see it all… It's tripe. It will be a terrific anticlimax. People are going to spend a lot of time not watching it and not talking about it." The automaker Chrysler dropped ads which were scheduled to air during the program.

For its part, the Soviet Union threatened to shut down the ABC News Moscow bureau, although this threat was not carried out and indeed seemed to strengthen ABC's resolve regarding the miniseries. "We're going to run that program come rain, blood, or horse manure", said ABC President John B. Sias, after the yet-to-be-aired Amerika had generated more controversy and viewer response than any other ABC program in history, including The Day After. The Discovery Channel countered by running 66 hours of Soviet-produced television, some of it live, including news, music videos, and films.

Amerika was preceded by an ABC special addressing the considerable controversy prior to its airing (The Storm Over Amerika), and was followed by an "ABC News Viewpoint" panel discussion moderated by Ted Koppel, with Brandon Stoddard, Donald Wrye, and others addressing the issues along with questions and comments from a live studio audience in Minneapolis, Minnesota.

After seeing the first episode and reading the shooting script, Tom Engelhardt stated that Amerika had "a plot line that makes suspension of disbelief into an act of grace." In its summary of the 1986–87 US television season, TV Guide called the miniseries "arguably the most boring miniseries in a decade", adding that "ABC's Amerika tried to hold America hostage for seven tedious nights (and a stupefyingly dull 14 1/2 hours) by conjuring up a fuzzy vision of a Communist occupation of the U.S."

=== Social criticism and commentary ===
Although it aired only two years before the fall of the Berlin Wall and the collapse of the Warsaw Pact, Amerika implied that American apathy and an unwillingness to defend freedom on the part of many citizens made the Soviet takeover rather easy. This depiction was objected to by those who saw it as needlessly provoking "overt jingoism," while labeling the miniseries "a fourteen-hour public apology to the White House from ABC executives for provoking public concern with The Day After."

The miniseries' depiction of the takeover of the US by a communist authority mirrored occurrences in Nicaragua, helping spur organizations such as the Freedom Federation into launching its own media campaign – along with William F. Buckley of the National Review and the Wall Street Journal – which used the film "as a pretext to persuade the public that the United States needed to continue its support of right-wing governments in Central America by aiding the Contras."

=== Ratings ===
The first two nights of Amerika garnered big ratings, but audience numbers dropped thereafter, and the overall miniseries averaged a 19 rating and a 29 share of American television households, compared to a 46 rating/62 share for The Day After. "It wasn't as big a hit as its supporters had hoped", said Ted Koppel, "but it wasn't a disaster, either." Amerika was the second-highest rated miniseries of the 1986–87 U.S. television season.

Although a 35 share reportedly had been promised to advertisers, Stoddard was happy with the performance of Amerika, claiming that all or part of the miniseries had been watched by 100 million people – a ratings bonanza for ABC, then in third place among the three major networks.

== Availability ==
Amerika has not been shown on U.S. television since its original telecast on ABC. A VHS box set of the miniseries was released by Anchor Bay Entertainment in 1995, but no official DVD release is available. Portions of the soundtrack by Basil Poledouris were released on CD by Prometheus Records in 2004 (in a limited edition of 3,000 copies). The novelization is widely available from used-book sellers and online auction sites. The miniseries itself can be found pirated on YouTube.

== Parodies ==
In February 1987, the miniseries was parodied on the NBC show Saturday Night Live as "Amerida", in which a debt-ridden United States is mortgaged to Canada and subsequently repossessed. It posited Wayne Gretzky as the prime minister of Amerida. The U.S. protagonist (played by Canadian actor Phil Hartman) longs for a country "where you don't have money that's all the colours of the rainbow" and "you don't have to punt on third down." To calm him down, his wife makes the offer of a beer: "How about a Labatt's, eh?" The flag of Amerida was the U.S. flag with the stars replaced by a white maple leaf.

The satirical Canadian radio program Double Exposure parodied the series in a sketch called Kanada with a K, in which "Joe Klark with a K" rescues the nation from "Comrade Ed".

== See also ==
- Red Dawn (1984 film)
- The Man in the High Castle
- The Price of Freedom (role-playing game)
- Culture during the Cold War
