= The Hot Touch =

- Directed by: Roger Vadim
- Written by: Peter Dion; Jean-Yves Pitoun
- Cinematography: François Protat
- Edited by: Stan Cole; Yurij Luhovy
- Music by: André Gagnon
- Distributed by: Astral Films (Canada) 20th Century Fox (USA) Manson International (International)
- Release date: 10 December 1982
- Running time: 93 minutes
- Country: Canada
- Language: English

The Hot Touch (also credited as Hot Touch) is a 1981 Canadian crime comedy film directed by Roger Vadim.

This caper film is set in the world of art forgery. An accomplished art forger and a businessman have for many years been successful in a company which authenticates paintings before they are auctioned. They are discovered by an art dealer and blackmailed into forging paintings which disappeared in the Second World War. Procedural detail around the act of forgery is exploited for high-rolling glamour. The Hot Touch was the final film appearance of veteran Academy Award-winning actor Melvyn Douglas.

== Cast ==
- Wayne Rogers as Danny Fairchild
- Marie-France Pisier as Dr. Simpson
- Lloyd Bochner as Severo
- Samantha Eggar as Samantha O'Brien
- Patrick Macnee as Vincent Reyblack
- Melvyn Douglas as Max Reich
