= Our Shining Moment =

1991 television film directed by Mark Tinker

- Genre: Drama
- Written by: Patrick Hasburgh
- Directed by: Mark Tinker
- Starring: Cindy Pickett; Max Gail
- Music by: Peter Bernstein
- Country of origin: United States
- Original language: English

Production
- Producer: Mark H. Ovitz
- Production location: Vancouver
- Running time: 60 minutes
- Production company: Touchstone Television

Original release
- Network: NBC
- Release: June 2, 1991

Our Shining Moment is a 1991 television family drama directed by Mark Tinker and starring Cindy Pickett, Max Gail and Don Ameche. It was intended as a pilot for a series which was never produced. It was broadcast on NBC on June 2, 1991.

== Premise ==
In 1963, a father and his teenage son forge a bond when the son is expelled from school and sees his secretly out-of-work father in the park.

== Cast ==
- Cindy Pickett as Betty McGuire
- Max Gail as John McGuire Jr.
- Jonathan Brandis as Michael "Scooter" McGuire
- Seth Green as "Wheels"
- LuAnne Ponce as Maureen McGuire
- Don Ameche as John "Papa" McGuire Sr.
- Shawn Levy as J.J.
- Alvin Sanders as Mr. Rahill
- Bill Dow as Barney
- Sonia Banman as Lois Jessel
- Alec Burden as Father Hogan
- Jack Black as a Teenage Boy
