= Jen Sussman =

American illustrator (1937–2002)

- Born: 8 August 1937; Nanjing, China
- Died: 8 August 2002 (aged 65); Vero Beach, Florida
- Occupations: artist, illustrator
- Spouse: Barth Jules Sussman

Jen Sussman (born 8 August 1937, Nanjing, China – died 8 August 2002, Vero Beach, Florida), was an artist, graphic designer and children's book illustrator.

Sussman worked as graphic designer for Time Life Books, Raymond Loewy (Paris) and George Nelson & Company (New York). She was also proprietor of her own design firm, Jen Sussman Holdings Ltd, whose clients included Gillette and Pantone.

She created the children's character Muggy based on her own pug. Muggy was briefly the Mascot of the Los Angeles Children's Museum, portrayed on the museum's official poster and other items.

In 1985 she created the artwork for a series of books for children, written by her husband Barth Jules Sussman, and initially sold through the Metropolitan Museum of Art, New York, and the Book of the Month Club, and in 1997, the artwork for a Muggy CD-based Coloring Book.

== Books ==
- Muggy Au Cirque: Hachette Jeunesse, Paris, 1985. ISBN 2-01-010751-9
- Muggy Recontre Bibi: Hachette Jeunesse, Paris, 1985. ISBN 2-01-010749-7
- La Journee de Muggy: Hachette Jeunesse, Paris, 1985. ISBN 2-01-010750-0
- Muggy: CD-ROM Coloring Book for Children – Muggy Press

EPUB picture books:

- Muggy the Happy Pug – A Lovely Day
- Muggy the Happy Pug – Muggy Meets Bibi
- Muggy the Happy Pug – Muggy Goes to the Circus
