= La Nouvelle tribu =

La Nouvelle tribu is a 1996 French mini series directed by Roger Vadim starring Marie-Christine Barrault and Sagamore Stévenin.
