= Marie-Christine Barrault =

French actress (born 1944)

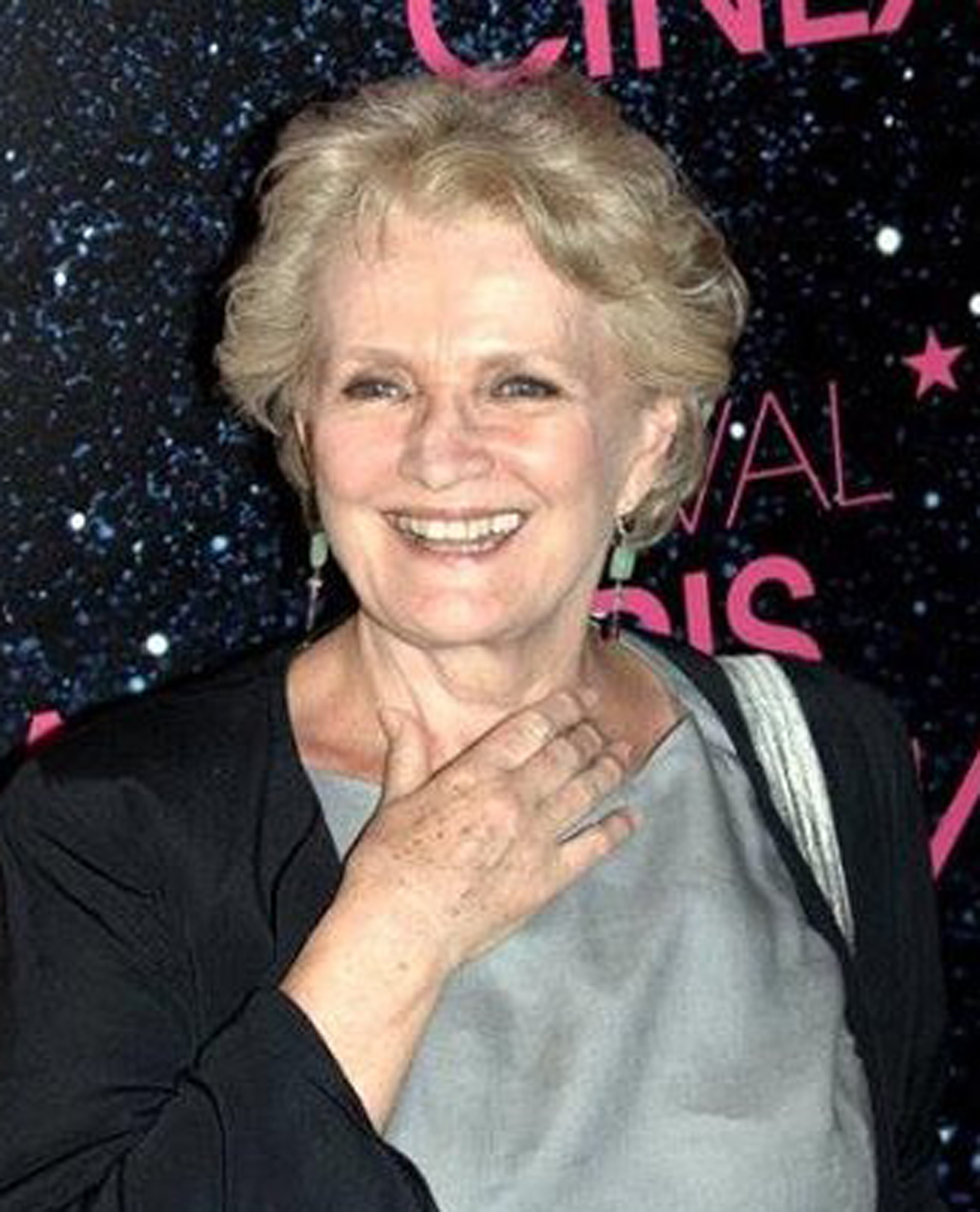
- Barrault in 2013
- Born: 21 March 1944 (age 82); Paris, France
- Occupation: Actress
- Years active: 1967–present
- Spouses: Daniel Toscan du Plantier (m. 1965; div. 1978) Roger Vadim (m. 1990; died 2000)
- Partner: Michel Boisrond
- Children: 2

Marie-Christine Barrault (French: [maʁi kʁistin baʁo]; born 21 March 1944) is a French actress. She is best known for her performances in My Night at Maud's (1969) and Cousin Cousine (1975). The latter which she was nominated for the Academy Award for Best Actress. In 2010, she released her autobiography, titled This Long Way to Get to You.

== Life and career ==
Marie-Christine Barrault was born in Paris, France, the daughter of Martha (née Valmier) and Max-Henri Barrault. Her parents later divorced. Barrault's father, who worked in the theatre, died while she was a teenager. With no support, her mother was unable to care for her and her brother, Alain. Barrault was raised by her grandmother, Felicite. She was mentored in acting by her aunt and uncle, French performers Jean-Louis Barrault and Madeleine Renaud. They initially did not support her dreams of becoming an actress. She performed in plays in secondary school and then enrolled in an acting conservatory.

Barrault got her start on television in L'oeuvre (1967). She made her feature film debut in Éric Rohmer's My Night at Maud's (1969). In 1970 Barrault was featured along with Pierre Richard in the comedy film Le Distrait. In 1975 Barrault starred in Cousin Cousine, for which she received an Academy Award nomination for Best Actress in a Leading Role. She worked with Rohmer once again in 1978, in the role of Guinevere in Perceval le Gallois and she also has a cameo in his Love in the Afternoon.

Barrault is not fluent in English and therefore has generally turned down offers to appear in English-language films. However, in 1980 she accepted an offer from Woody Allen to appear in his film Stardust Memories. In 1988 she was nominated for a Genie Award for her performance in No Blame. In 1991 she portrayed Marie Curie in a television mini-series. In her later career, she has preferred acting on the stage in France. In 2015, she came to Los Angeles on tour to perform in the play Les Yeux Ouverts, in which she portrays French author Marguerite Yourcenar.

Barrault's first husband was producer Daniel Toscan du Plantier, whom she married in 1965. With him, she had two children, David and Ariane. Barrault was married to director Roger Vadim from 1990 until his death from cancer in 2000. She herself is a survivor of breast cancer.

In 2024, she returned to the silver screen in an Italian film, Per il mio bene, the debut feature by Mimmo Verdesca, in which she plays the complex role of “Anna”, a mother wounded and tormented by a disturbing past.

== Select filmography ==
- L'oeuvre (1967, TV movie) Christine
- My Night at Maud's (1969) Françoise
- Lancelot of the Lake (1970, TV movie) La reine Guenièvre
- Le distrait (1970) Lisa Gastier
- Le misanthrope (1971, TV movie) Célimène
- Les papiers d'Aspern (1971, TV movie) Hélène Prest
- Le sagouin (1972, TV movie) Léone
- Figaro-ci, Figaro-là (1972, TV movie) Julie
- Love in the Afternoon (1972) Dream Sequence
- Les intrus (1972) Françoise
- Histoire vraie (1973, TV movie) Rose
- L'enlèvement (1973, TV movie) Marie-Josèphe
- Le tour d'écrou (1974, TV movie) Miss Jessel
- La famille Grossfelder (1974, TV movie) Marie-Louise en 1930
- La confession d'un enfant du siècle (1974, TV movie) Brigitte
- John Glückstadt (1975) Hanna Hansen
- Cousin Cousine (1975) Marthe
- By the Tennis Courts (1976) Marie-Christine
- Le chandelier (1977, TV movie) Jacqueline
- The Medusa Touch (1978) Patricia
- The Savage State (1978) Laurence
- Perceval le Gallois (1978) La Reine Guenevievre
- Woman Between Wolf and Dog (1979) Lieve
- Vestire gli ignudi (1979, TV movie) Ersilia
- The Wonderful Adventures of Nils (1980, TV series) Narrator
- My Dearest (1980) Jeanne
- Petit déjeuner compris (1980, TV mini-series) Marie-Louise Leroux
- Même les mômes ont du vague à l'âme (1980) Eva
- Stardust Memories (1980) Isobel
- L'amour trop fort (1981) Rose-Marie de Boisel
- Après tout ce qu'on a fait pour toi (1982, TV movie) Jeanne
- Le village sur la colline (1982, TV mini-series) Mme de Cheilly
- Mir reicht's – ich steig aus (1983)
- Table for Five (1983) Marie
- A Love in Germany (1983) Maria Wyler
- Les mots pour le dire (1983) Eliane
- Orpheus (1983, TV movie) La mort
- Swann in Love (1984) Madame Verdurin
- Pianoforte (1984) La mère de Maria
- L'année terrible (1985, TV movie)
- Louise... l'insoumise (1985) Mme Royer
- Le passage (1985, TV movie) Rhona
- Je suis à Rio, ne m'attends pas pour dîner (1985, TV movie) Constance
- A Better Life (1985) La mère de Véronique
- Power of Evil (1985) Sylvie
- Le soulier de satin (1985) La lune
- L'été 36 (1986, TV movie) Lise
- Vaudeville (1986) Madeleine
- The Lizard King (1987, TV movie)
- Manuela's Loves (1987) Manuela
- Bonne fête maman (1987, TV movie) Jeanne Thomas
- No Blame (1988, TV movie) Suzanne
- Daniya, jardín del harem (1988) Almodís
- Adieu je t'aime (1988) Nicole Dupré
- The Abyss (1988) Hilzonde
- Sanguine (1988) Nedie
- Women in Prison (1988) Dessombes
- Une femme tranquille (1989, TV movie) Marianne
- Jesus of Montreal (1989) Dubbing actress
- Un été d'orages (1989) Anne
- Gallant Ladies (1990) Jacquette de Bourdeille
- Moi, général de Gaulle (1990, TV movie) Mme Costal
- L'enfant des loups (1991, TV movie) Leubovère
- Marie Curie, une femme honorable (1991, TV mini-series) Marie Curie
- Necessary Love (1991) Valentina
- Jenny Marx, la femme du diable (1993, TV movie) Jenny Marx
- Amour Fou (1993, TV movie) Louise
- Next Time the Fire (1993) Elena
- Bonsoir (1994) Marie Wileska
- Les maîtresses de mon mari (1995, TV movie) Elisa
- La nouvelle tribu (1996, TV mini-series) Jeanne
- Tendre piège (1996, TV movie) Françoise
- Mon père avait raison (1996, TV movie) Germaine Bellanger
- Un coup de baguette magique (1997, TV movie) Jeanne
- Obsession (1997) Ella Beckmann
- Les braconniers de Belledombre (1997, TV movie) Françoise Sampaing
- Love, Math and Sex (1997) La prof de maths
- Le grand Batre (1997, TV movie) Thérèse
- Maison de famille (1999, TV movie) Françoise Cornier
- The Dilettante (1999) Thérèse Rambert
- Azzurro (2000) Elizabeth Broyer
- Le vieil ours et l'enfant (2001, TV movie) La Duchesse
- Les amants de Mogador (2002)
- Le Don fait à Catchaires (2003, TV movie) Jeanne
- La deuxième vérité (2003, TV movie) Mathilde
- Rêves en France (2003, TV movie) Madame Labourdette
- Droit d'asile (2003, TV movie) Christine
- Saint-Germain ou La négociation (2003, TV movie) Catherine de Médicis
- Parlez-moi d'amour (2005, TV movie) Élisa
- Ange de feu (2006, TV movie) Janine Cordey
- Passés troubles (2006, TV movie) Béatrice
- Trivial (2007) Mélanie Bérangère
- Making Plans for Lena (2009) Annie
- L'Art de la fugue (2014) Nelly
- Shades of Truth (2015) Sister Maria Angelica
- Blind Willow, Sleeping Woman (2022) Komura's mother
- Et doucement rallumer les etoiles (2023, TV movie)
- Fiasco (2024, TV series)
- 'The Ties That Bind Us (2024)

- Per il mio bene (2024) Anna
- A Woman's Life (2026)
