= Roger Vadim =

French filmmaker (1928–2000)

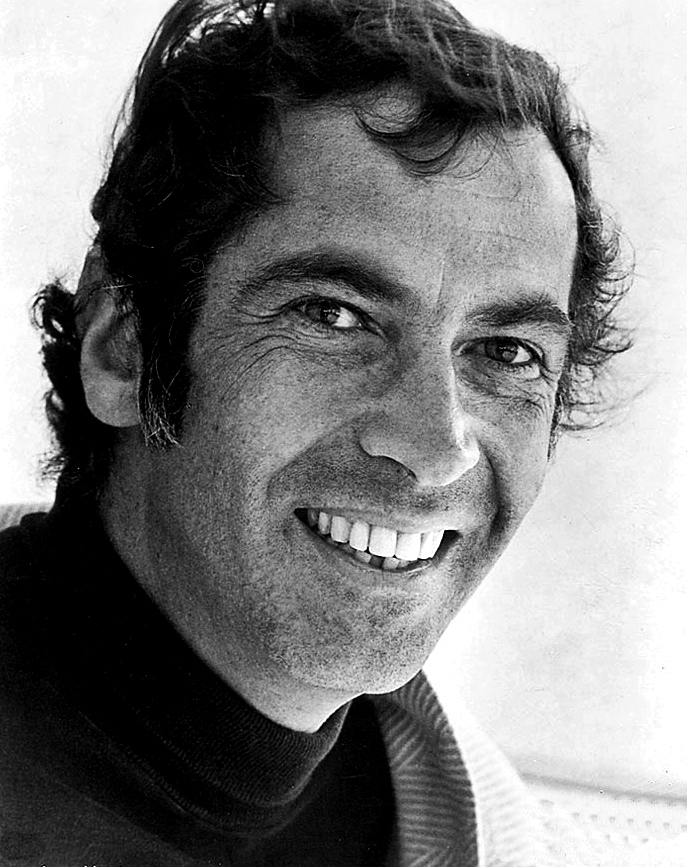
- Vadim in 1971
- Born: Roger Vadim Plemiannikov; 26 January 1928; Paris, France
- Died: 11 February 2000 (aged 72); Paris, France
- Occupations: Film director; screenwriter; producer; author; actor; artist
- Years active: 1950–1997
- Spouses: Brigitte Bardot (m. 1952; div. 1957) Annette Strøyberg (m. 1958; div. 1961) Jane Fonda (m. 1965; div. 1973) Catherine Schneider (m. 1975; div. 1977) Marie-Christine Barrault (m. 1990)
- Partners: Catherine Deneuve (1961–1964); Ann Biderman (1980–1987)
- Children: 4, including Christian

Roger Vadim Plemiannikov (French: [ʁɔʒe vadim]; 26 January 1928 – 11 February 2000) was a French screenwriter, film director, and producer, as well as an author, artist, and occasional actor. His best-known works are visually lavish films with erotic qualities, such as And God Created Woman (1956), Blood and Roses (1960), The Game Is Over (1966), Barbarella (1968), and Pretty Maids All in a Row (1971).

== Early life ==
Vadim was born Roger Vadim Plemiannikov in Paris. His father, Igor Nikolaevich Plemiannikov, a native of Kiev hailing from an old noble family, White military officer and pianist, he fled to France to escape the horrors of the revolution and the civil war and become a naturalized French citizen. He was a vice consul of France to Egypt, stationed in Alexandria, later posting to Mersin, Turkey as a consul. Vadim's mother, Marie-Antoinette (née Ardilouze), was a stage actress. He had one sister, Hélène Plemiannikov (1929–2022). Although Vadim lived as a diplomat's child in Northern Africa and the Middle East in his early youth, the death of his father when Vadim was nine years old caused the family to return to France, where his mother found work running a hostel in the French Alps, which functioned as a way-station for Jews and other fugitives fleeing Nazism.

Vadim studied journalism and writing at the Paris Institute of Political Studies (Sciences Po), without graduating.

== Film career ==
At age 19, he became assistant to film director Marc Allégret, whom he met while working at the Theatre Sarah Bernhardt, and for whom he worked on several screenplays. He was an assistant director on Allegret's Blanche Fury (1948), a commercially unsuccessful melodrama which Allegret made for a British company in English. Vadim was one of several writers on Allegret's French-British The Naked Heart (1950), aka Maria Chapdelaine, starring Michèle Morgan, as well as serving as assistant director. It was shot in French and English versions. Blackmailed (1951) was another film Allegret directed in England, starring Mai Zetterling and Dirk Bogarde; Vadim was credited as one of the writers. He was also one of several writers on Allegret's, La demoiselle et son revenant (1952).

Vadim did the screenplay and commentary for a documentary, Le gouffre de la Pierre Saint-Marti (1953), and was assistant director on Allegret's Julietta (1953), a popular romance with Jean Marais, Dany Robin and Jeanne Moreau. Vadim wrote Allegret's Loves of Three Queens (1954), with Hedy Lamarr. Vadim had begun a relationship with model-actress Brigitte Bardot. She was given a good role in a drama directed by Allegret, School for Love (1953), aka Futures Vedettes, starring Jean Marais; Vadim wrote the script with Allegret. The film was a commercial disappointment. However the next collaboration between Allegret, Bardot and Vadim, Plucking the Daisy (1956), aka Mam'selle Striptease, was a huge success at the French box office. So too was Naughty Girl (1956), with Bardot. This allowed Vadim to get backing for his first movie as director.

Vadim's first film as director was based on an original story of his, And God Created Woman (1956). Starring Bardot, Curt Jurgens and Christian Marquand and produced by Raoul Levy it was not only a major success in France, but around the world, and established Bardot as a global icon. Vadim followed it with No Sun in Venice (1957) starring Françoise Arnoul and Marquand, produced by Levy, which was considerably less popular than And God Created Woman. Levy, Vadim and Bardot were to make Paris by Night with Frank Sinatra but Bardot refused to spend months in the US and Sinatra felt likewise about filming in France. Instead Vadim made The Night Heaven Fell (1958), starring Bardot and Stephen Boyd. He was one of several writers on Allegret's popular comedy, Be Beautiful But Shut Up (1958), starring Mylène Demongeot.

Vadim's next film was an adaptation of the book Les liaisons dangereuses (1959), which he wrote and directed. It starred Moreau, Gérard Philipe (in his final film) and Annette Strøyberg, a Danish model who became Vadim's second wife. The film became a huge hit in France. Strøyberg was also in the vampire film Blood and Roses (1960). Vadim was reunited with Bardot for Please, Not Now! (1961), a popular comedy. He was one of several directors of the anthology film, The Seven Deadly Sins (1962).

Vadim began a relationship with a young Catherine Deneuve. She starred in a segment of the anthology film Tales of Paris (1962), which was written by Vadim and directed by Allegret. She starred in a film Vadim helped write and produce, And Satan Calls the Turns (1962), and was also in Vice and Virtue (1963), which Vadim directed. Vadim had another success writing and directing for Bardot, Love on a Pillow (1962), but found less favour with Nutty, Naughty Chateau (1963) starring Monica Vitti.

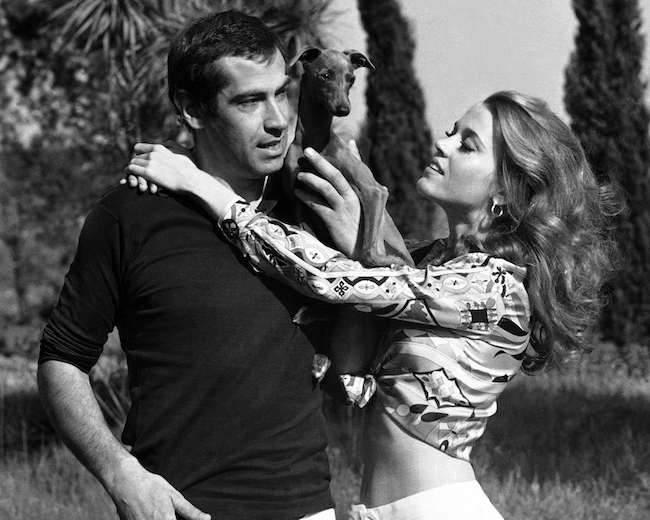
Vadim and Fonda in Rome in 1967

Vadim tried another adaptation of a classic erotic text, La Ronde (1964). He said at the time, "When I make a picture about relations between people, something erotic comes through; I can't help it! But sex has been an inspiration, the greatest inspiration, since art exists." One of the film's many stars was rising American actress Jane Fonda who began a romantic relationship with Vadim. Vadim devised a vehicle for Fonda, The Game Is Over (1966), based on a book by Émile Zola. Shot in French and English versions, it was very popular in France, though less so in the US.

Dino de Laurentiis wanted Fonda to star in a science fiction sex comedy, Barbarella (1968) and she agreed provided Vadim would direct. Following this he directed Fonda in a segment of the omnibus horror film Spirits of the Dead (1968) along with her brother Peter Fonda. During his marriage to Fonda, Vadim would accompany her back to the US periodically while she made movies there. He directed Pretty Maids All in a Row (1971) for MGM, starring Rock Hudson and Angie Dickinson. It was a commercial disappointment.

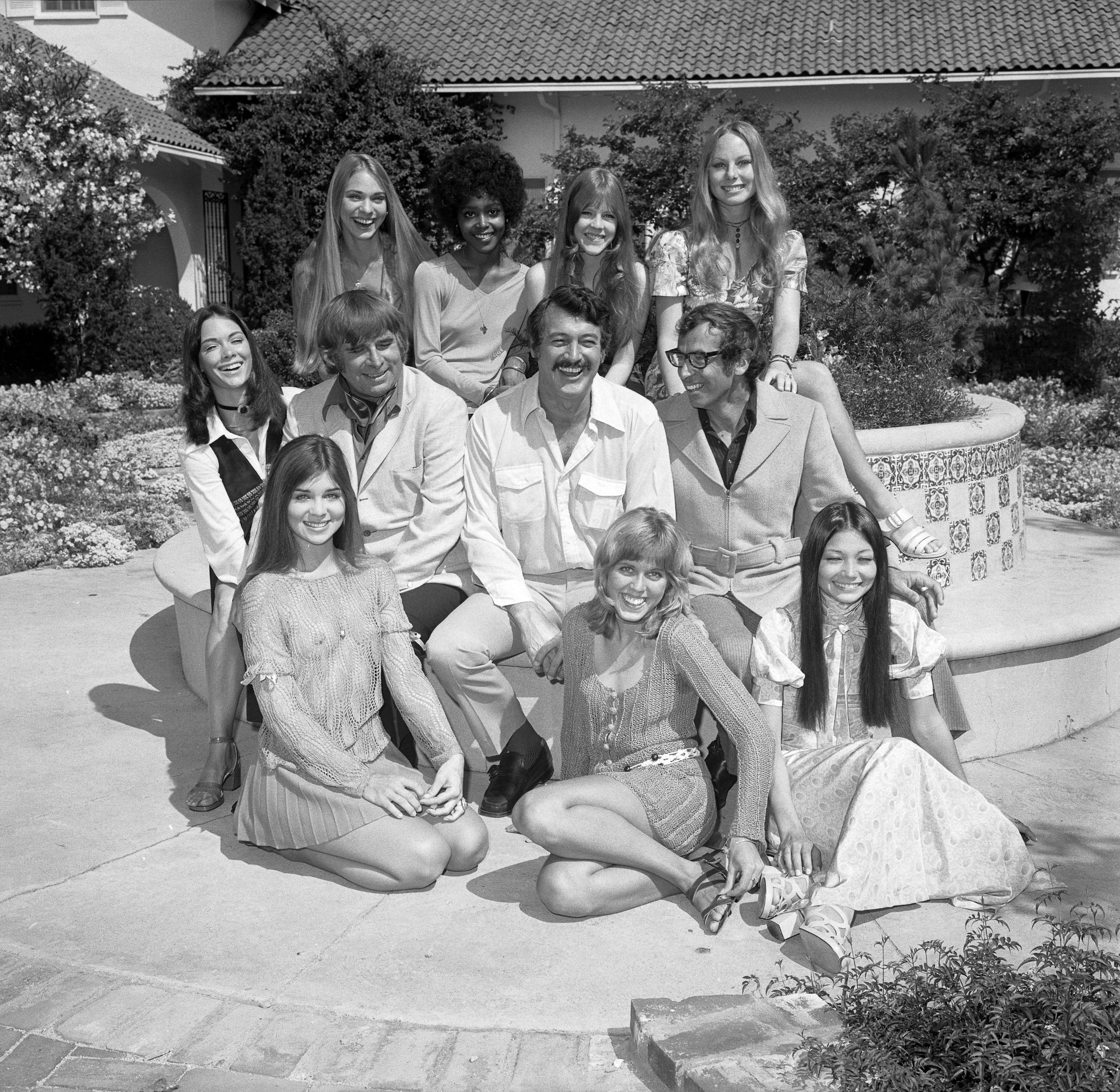
Cast of Pretty Maids All in a Row (L-R): (front row) June Fairchild, Joy Bang, Aimee Eccles; (middle row) Joanna Cameron, Gene Roddenberry, Rock Hudson, Roger Vadim; (back row) Margaret Markov, Brenda Sykes, Diane Sherry, Gretchen Burrell

Vadim returned to France. He wrote and directed Hellé (1972), starring Gwen Welles, which was a flop. He was reunited with Bardot for Don Juan, or If Don Juan Were a Woman (1973), which was Bardot's penultimate movie and a commercial disappointment. Not particularly successful either were Charlotte (1974), and Game of Seduction (1976) with Sylvia Kristel and Nathalie Delon. He directed a TV movie Bonheur, impair et passe (1977), starring Danielle Darrieux.

In the 1980s Vadim based himself in the US. He directed Night Games (1980), where he attempted to make a star of Cindy Pickett, with whom he became romantically involved. He directed a caper film in Canada, The Hot Touch (1981), starring Marie-France Pisier. Back in France he wrote and directed Surprise Party (1983). He directed episodes of Faerie Tale Theatre (1984) and Deadly Nightmares (1986). Vadim attempted to recapture his former success with a new version of And God Created Woman (1988), with Rebecca De Mornay. Very different from the original – it only really used the same title – it failed critically and commercially.

His final years were spent working in TV, where he directed Safari (1991) and wrote and directed Amour fou (1993), starring Marie-Christine Barrault who became his final wife. She was also in La Nouvelle tribu (1996) and its sequel Un coup de baguette magique (1997), which Vadim wrote and directed.

== Personal life ==
=== Romances ===
Vadim was celebrated for his romances and marriages to young beautiful actresses. In his mid-30s, he lived with a young Catherine Deneuve, by whom he had a son, Christian Vadim, between his marriages to Strøyberg and Fonda. He was also involved with Margaret Markov, Sylvia Kristel and Cindy Pickett. Later, he cohabited with screenwriter Ann Biderman for several years, announcing their engagement in 1984, but the couple never wed.

=== Marriages ===
- Brigitte Bardot, 20 December 1952 – 6 December 1957 (divorced)
- Annette Strøyberg, 17 June 1958 – 14 March 1961 (divorced); 1 daughter (Nathalie) b. 7 December 1957
- Jane Fonda, 14 August 1965 – 16 January 1973 (divorced); 1 daughter (Vanessa) b. 28 September 1968
- Catherine Schneider, 13 December 1975 – 10 June 1977 (divorced); 1 son (Vania) b. 6 April 1974
- Marie-Christine Barrault, 21 December 1990 – 11 February 2000 (his death)

He also had two stepsons from his marriage to Schneider (younger sister of novelist Dominique Schneidre and heiress to the Schneider-Creusot steel and armaments firm), as well as adult stepchildren from Barrault's first marriage to Daniel Toscan du Plantier, also a friend of Vadim's, who called him "a happy man. He was someone in whom there was so much satisfaction to the end of his life. The films merely reflected his happiness." Nathalie, his eldest daughter, told Fonda biographer Patricia Bosworth: "Jane was the love of my father's life."

== Writing ==
In addition to Vadim's theatre and film work, he also wrote several books, including the memoirs "Memoires du Diable", "Le Gout du Bonheur: Souvenirs 1940–1958" and an autobiography, D'une étoile à l'autre (From One Star to the Next) as well as a tell-all about his most famous exes, Bardot, Deneuve & Fonda: My Life with the Three Most Beautiful Women in the World, published in 1986. "My attitude is that if this book makes me a little money it will be a tiny compensation for all the money I helped those actresses make", Vadim explained. He also wrote several plays and books of fiction, including L'ange affamé.

== Death ==
Vadim died of lymphoma at age 72 on 11 February 2000. His widow, Barrault, and ex-wives Bardot, Fonda, Schneider and Strøyberg all attended his funeral; ex-girlfriends Biderman and Deneuve did not. He is buried at St. Tropez Cemetery.

== Filmography ==
=== Writer/director ===
Year	Title	Original title	Notes
1950	The Naked Heart	Maria Chapdelaine	Writer only
1951	Blackmailed	—N/a	Writer only
1956	Plucking the Daisy	Mam'selle Striptease	Writer only
1956	And God Created Woman	Et Dieu... créa la femme	—N/a
1957	No Sun in Venice	Sait-on jamais?	—N/a
1957	Be Beautiful But Shut Up	Sois belle et tais-toi	Writer only
1958	The Night Heaven Fell	Les Bijoutiers du Clair de Lune	—N/a
1959	Dangerous Liaisons	Les liaisons dangereuses	—N/a
1960	Blood and Roses	...Et mourir de plaisir (Le sang et la rose)	—N/a
1961	Please Not Now!	La Bride sur le cou	—N/a
1962	The Seven Deadly Sins	Les Sept péchés capitaux	Segment: "Pride"
1962	Tales of Paris	Les Parisiennes	Segment: "Beds and Broads"
1962	Love on a Pillow	Le Repos du guerrier	—N/a
1963	Castle in Sweden	Château en Suède	—N/a
1963	Vice and Virtue	Le vice et la vertu	—N/a
1964	Circle of Love	La ronde	—N/a
1966	The Game Is Over	La Curée	—N/a
1968	Spirits of the Dead	Histoires extraordinaires	Segment: "Metzengerstein"
1968	Barbarella	—N/a	—N/a
1971	Pretty Maids All in a Row	—N/a	American production
1972	Hellé	—N/a	—N/a
1973	Don Juan, or If Don Juan Were a Woman	Don Juan ou Si Don Juan était une femme	—N/a
1974	The Murdered Young Girl	La jeune fille assassinée	Also known as Charlotte
1976	Game of Seduction	Une femme fidèle	—N/a
1977	Unlucky Happiness	Bonheur, impair et passe	TV movie
1980	Night Games	Jeux de Nuit	—N/a
1981	The Hot Touch	—N/a	American-Canadian production
1983	Surprise Party	—N/a	—N/a
1984	Faerie Tale Theatre	—N/a	Episode: "Beauty and the Beast"
1986	The Hitchhiker	—N/a	Episode: "Dead Man's Curve"
1986	And God Created Woman	—N/a	Shares title with Vadim's 1956 film, but has a completely different story
1991	Safari	—N/a	TV movie
1993	Mad Love	Amour fou	TV movie
1996	The New Tribe	La Nouvelle tribu	TV miniseries
1996	My Father Was Right	Mon père avait raison	TV movie
1997	A Touch of Magic	Un coup de baguette magique	TV movie

=== Actor ===
- Pétrus (1946)
- School for Love (1955)
- Sweet and Sour (1963)
- Ciao! Manhattan (1972)
- The Assassinated Young Girl (1974)
- Rich and Famous (1981)
- Into the Night (1985)
