= Texan cuisine =

Food and drinks from Texas

Texan cuisine is the food associated with the Southern U.S. state of Texas, including its native Southwestern cuisine–influenced Tex-Mex foods. Texas is a large state, and its cuisine has been influenced by a wide range of cultures, including Tejano/Mexican, Native American, Creole/Cajun, African-American, German, Czech, Southern and other European American groups. The cuisine of neighboring states also influences Texan cuisine, such as New Mexican cuisine and Louisiana Creole cuisine. This can be seen in the widespread usage of New Mexico chiles, Cayenne peppers, and Tabasco sauce in Texan cooking.

== Agriculture ==
In the 1880s, citrus growers in Texas and Florida discovered pink-fleshed seedless grapefruit mutations like the Ruby. Early varieties like the Duncan had many seeds and pale flesh.

Citrus is grown commercially in Texas only in the Rio Grande valley, centered on Hidalgo County. Other fruit trees grown commercially include peaches. A center of peach production is Parker County and the county seat of Weatherford hosts an annual peach festival in July. Apples have historically been grown commercially only in the Davis Mountains, due to their chill-hour requirements. Melons are grown across the state and are particularly suited to North Texas, with several varieties emerging from Parker County. Nearby Wise County continues to grow large amounts of melons. Blackberries and grapes are some of the most well-suited crops for the state, due to their tolerance for hot, intense summer weather as well as a relative lack of pests.

== Specialties ==
=== Barbecue ===
Barbeque sausages in an open barbecue pit

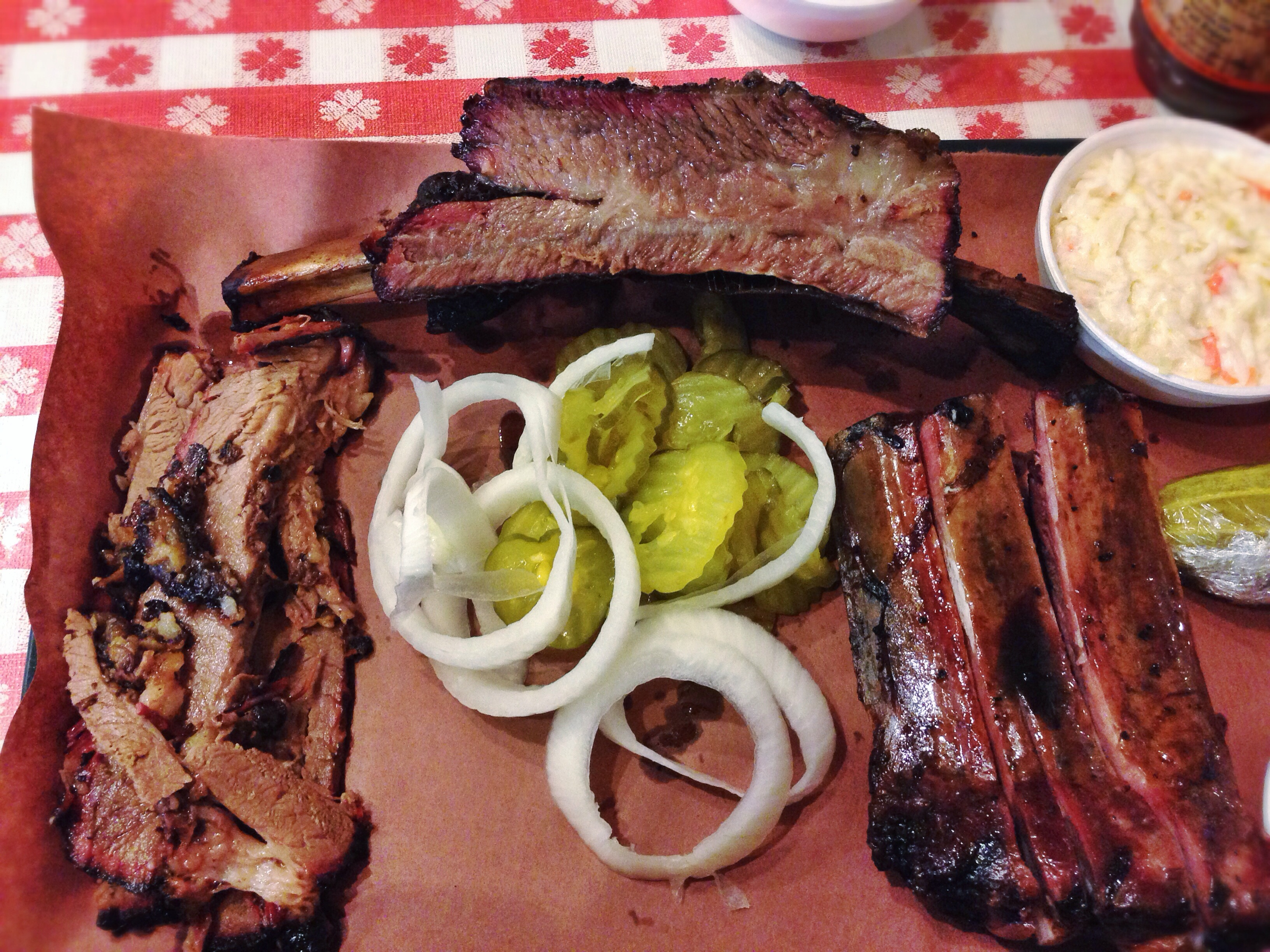
Central Texas-style barbecue, which is traditionally without sauce

Texas barbecue was influenced by the cooking technique barbacoa, a method of slow cooking meat that has been wrapped in leaves in a covered pit.

In the 19th century, cowboys developed techniques to cook the tough beef from range cattle over coals and colonial style open pit barbecue was brought to the state when blacks arrived from the southeast, but later developed into closed pit Western-style barbecue which uses indirect heat instead of coals and imparts a smokier flavor.

Barbecue in Texas is most commonly served with white bread, spicy sauces, pickles, sliced onion, and jalapeños; sides include pinto beans, potato or rice salad, and cabbage slaw. Common desserts served with barbecue are fruit cobbler, banana pudding, and pecan pie.

==== Steak and beef ====
Texas is among a handful of states that developed an early preference for beef barbecue, alongside other states in the neighboring cuisine of the Southwestern United States and the cuisine of the Western United States. Beef brisket (slowly cooked in smoke in a wood-fired "pit") is the most common barbecue.

The influence of steak on Texas barbecue is so great that it is often highlighted in popular culture, for example the animated sitcom King of the Hill. Restaurants that serve Texan cuisine, such as The Big Texan Steak Ranch, and even national brands like Texas Roadhouse, often specialize in steak in particular.

It is illegal to defame the cattle and ranching industries, of either Texas or the Southwestern United States, within the state of Texas.

==== Pork ====
Near the end of the 19th century, immigrants from Germany and Eastern Europe introduced their distinctive culinary traditions, including sausage making, marked by bold and sometimes piquant spicing and coarser texture, which became part of Texan barbecue culture and smoked sausage remains a popular dish at Western-style barbecues. Early American traditional whole-hog barbecues and later rib barbecues were prepared with pork.

=== Dessert and pastry ===
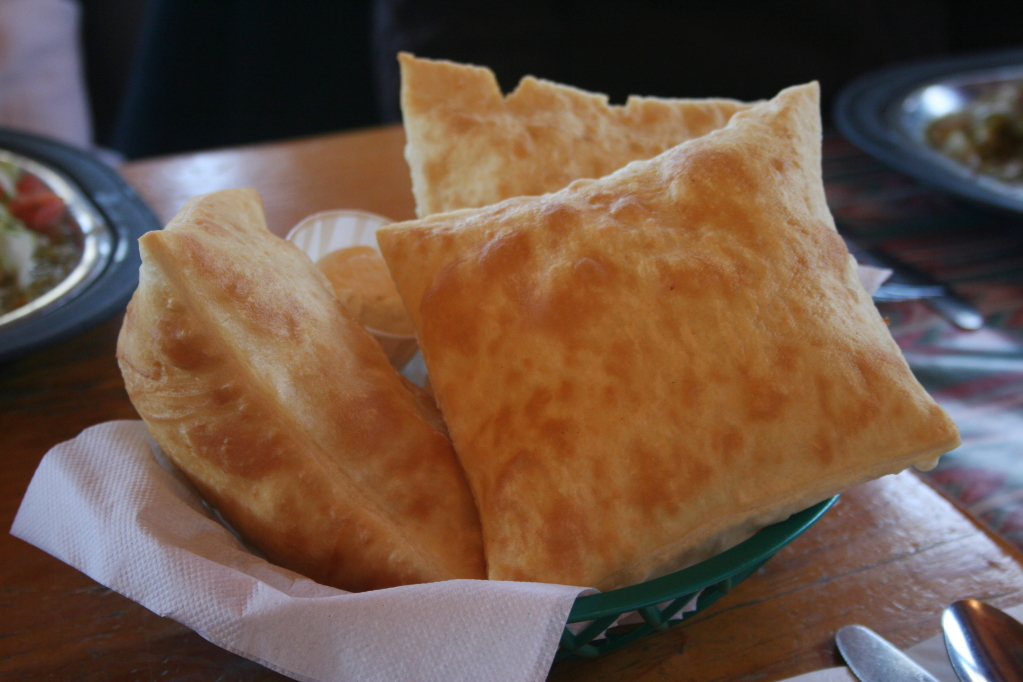
Basket of sopapillas

Bohemian immigrants brought a tradition of pastry-making including fruit-filled kolaches and sausage-filled klobasniky, pastries. The Texas Legislature has declared West, Texas the "Home of the Official Kolache of the Texas Legislature," while Caldwell, Texas is "Kolache Capital of Texas." Strudel was brought to Texas by German immigrants.

Sopapillas are a simple fried pastry dough sweetened with sugar and cinnamon. The dish has roots in a lard-fried pastry made by the Tigua Pueblo and Franciscan friars from New Mexico in Ysleta, El Paso. This early form of the pastry dates to at least 1682, as the style originates in New Mexican cuisine, making it one of the earliest pastries known found in Texan cuisine.

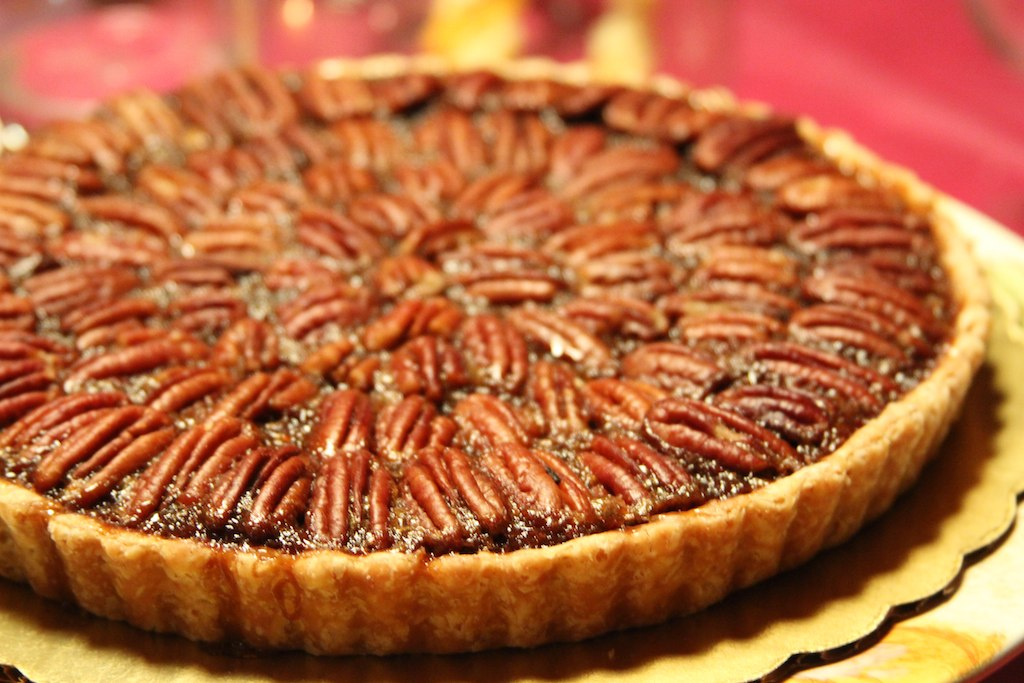
Pecan pie

Pecan pie is the official state pie of Texas.

Though the origin of the term Texas sheet cake is unknown, with some speculating it's a reference to the cake's large size or decadence, and others who believe it's because the cake includes Texas-style ingredients like buttermilk and pecans, the cake has become a popular dessert throughout the United States since the original recipe was published by The Dallas Morning News in 1957.

Peach cobbler is the official cobbler.

=== Hamburger ===
An early claim to the invention of the hamburger was Fletcher Davis of Athens, Texas, who claimed to have served it at his restaurant at a time when there were more cows than people in Texas. According to oral histories, in the 1880s, he opened a lunch counter in Athens and served a "burger" of fried ground beef patties with mustard and Bermuda onion between two slices of bread; with a pickle on the side.

The claim is that in 1904, Davis and his wife Ciddy ran a sandwich stand at the St. Louis World's Fair. Historian Frank X. Tolbert noted that Athens resident Clint Murchison said his grandfather dated the hamburger to the 1880s with "Old Dave" a.k.a. Fletcher Davis.

A photo of "Old Dave's Hamburger Stand" from the 1904 connection was sent to Tolbert as evidence of the claim. Also the New York Tribune namelessly attributed the innovation of the hamburger to the stand on the pike.

=== Southern ===
European settlers and African American slaves brought the culinary traditions of the Deep South with them including biscuits, red-eye gravy, pan-fried chicken, black-eyed peas, mashed potatoes, cornbread or corn pone, sweet tea, and desserts like peach cobbler and pecan pie.

Even after emancipation, many former slaves who had been cooks and domestic servants were not able to afford the highest quality meats and are recognized for the skilled preparation of simple ingredients like greens and beans flavored with salt pork, hog jowl, peppers and spices.

These staple dishes were served alongside game meats, fried chicken and fried catfish. French immigrants from Louisiana introduced influences from Cajun and Louisiana Creole cuisine.

Some claim the corn dog was invented by vendors at the Texas State Fair.

Confederate cush is a dish associated with Confederate troops, the preparation of which was described by one Texas native in 1863 as follows: "chop up a small quantity of fat bacon into a frying pan, get the grease all out of it, put in a quart of water, when it boils crumble in cold corn bread and stir until dry".

Fried okra is a quintessential side dish throughout the American South, including Texas.

== Hybrid cuisines ==
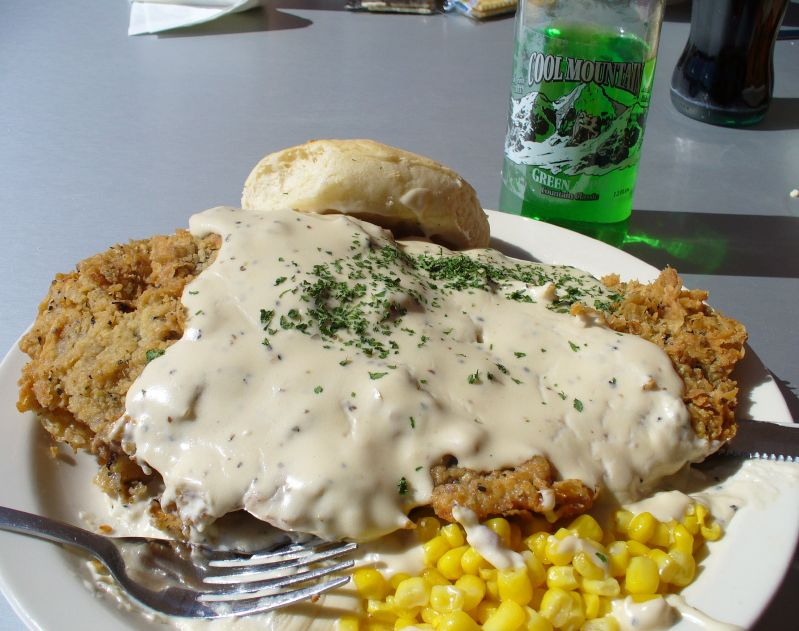
Chicken fried steak

Dating back to the era of French and Spanish colonial rule in Texas, relations between ethnic groups were tense throughout history, but despite these animosities they have enjoyed food from varied cuisines and incorporated borrowed ingredients into their own, contributing to Texas's varied and rich food culture.

Tex-Mex is the best known hybrid cuisine from Texas but there are many others with contributions from around thirty ethnic groups including Czech, Korean, and Indian. Korean donut shops sell jalapeño kolaches, Indians make fajitas with chutney, and Czech-Tex style hot dogs are topped with both sauerkraut and chili con carne. Other fusion dishes like bulgogi and banh mi burgers can be found as well.

The origin of chicken-fried steak is unknown. The town of Lamesa, Texas is claimed as the source of the dish. Governor Rick Perry declared it the "birthplace of the chicken fried steak" in 2011. Lamesa hosts the Chicken Fried Steak Festival each April. Other views are that the dish developed in the cattle country of Texas and the Midwest, or that the dish is a variation of German schnitzel.

=== Tex-Mex ===
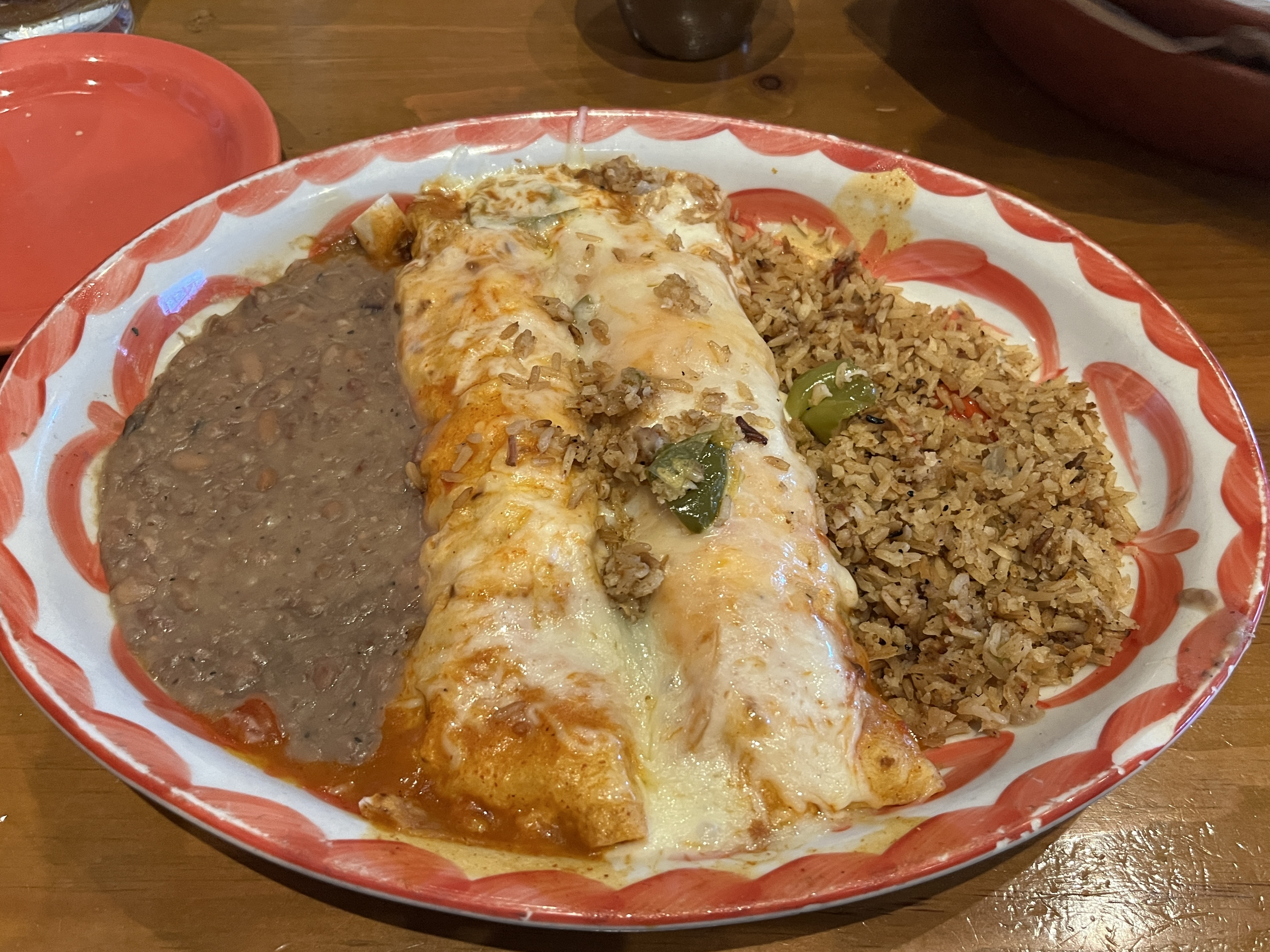
Enchilada plate with rice and refried beans

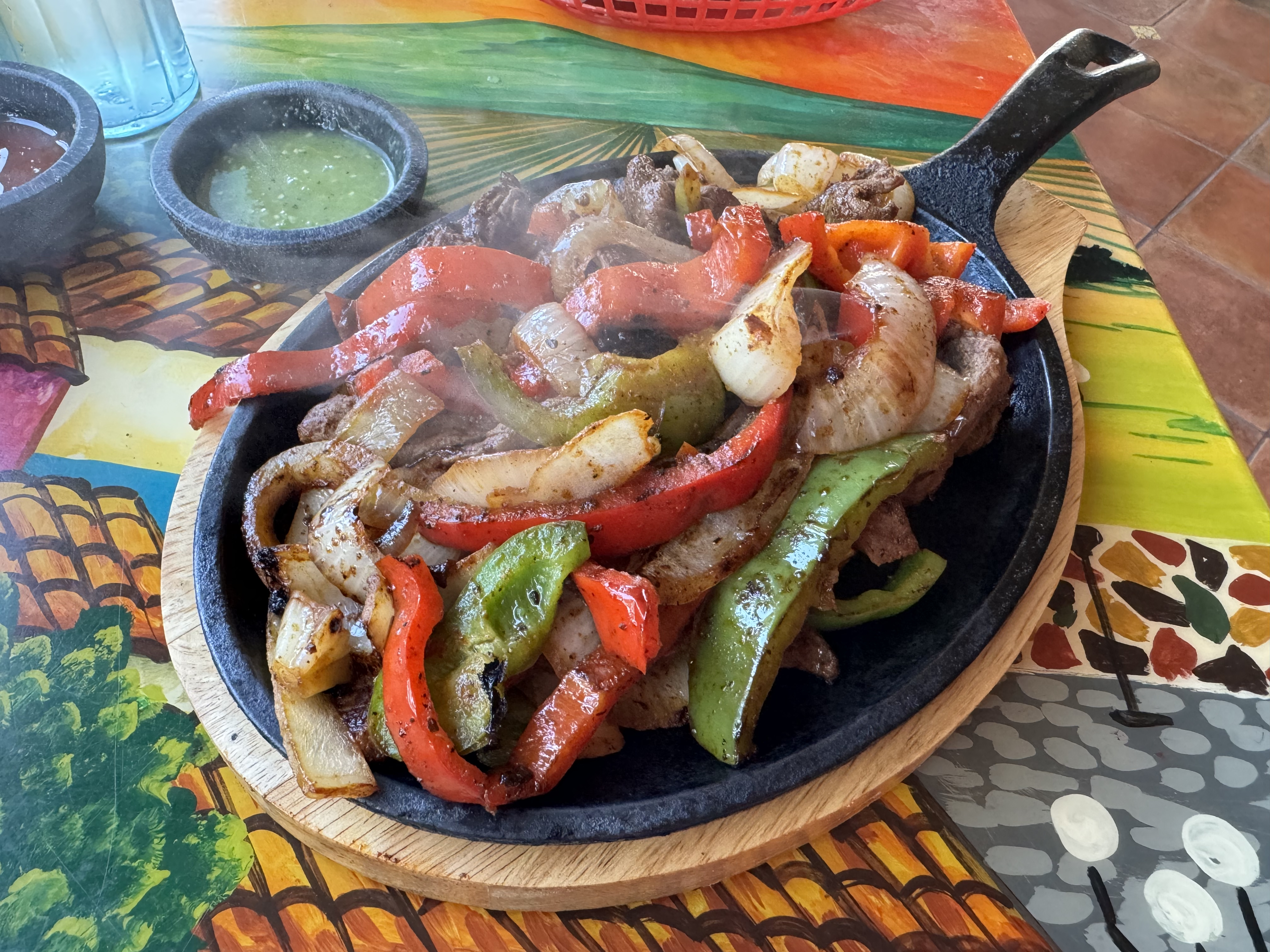
Fajitas

Tex-Mex refers to a style of cooking that combines traditional Northeastern Mexican cuisine that makes heavy use of beef and extremely hot, tiny chiltepin pepper. Combination plates featuring tacos, enchiladas and tostadas served alongside rice and beans are not found in traditional Mexican cuisine.

This custom developed only when Mexican-American cooks adapted offerings for customers who preferred a full plate, rather than the traditional style of eating small, separate dishes.

Commercial manufacture of chili powders began in Texas in the 1890s. Today, chili is the official state dish. Texas is known for its variation of chili con carne.

Texas chili is typically made with hot peppers and beef (or sometimes game meats like venison) and is sometimes served with pinto beans, either as a side dish or in the chili itself.

The dish can be topped with an assortment of garnishes including fresh or pickled jalapeños, raw onions or crumbled soda crackers. Thick chili gravy is served over tamales and enchiladas.

Frank X. Tolbert's 1953 recipe included beef-kidney suet, ancho chiles and lean beef for stewing such as chuck seasoned with oregano, garlic, cumin and cayenne pepper.

Breakfast items include scrambled egg in flour tortilla tacos as migas and huevos con chorizo, huevos rancheros, and empanadas of various meats.

King Ranch casserole is made with chicken, cream of mushroom and chicken soups, cheese and tortilla chips.

Entrees are commonly accompanied by pan-fried potato and refried beans. Ingredients commonly used in Tex-Mex cuisine include goat, chicken, pork, beef, venison, eggs, cheese, milk, beans, masa harina, peppers, chocolate, and various spices.

Puffy tacos made with deep-fried handmade corn tortillas and served with beef picadillo are a San Antonio specialty.

Pan de campo is the official state bread. Also called "cowboy bread", the simple recipe was traditionally baked in a Dutch oven.

Desserts include flan, tres leches cake, sopapillas and pralines.

In the ranch lands of the 1930s, after cattle were butchered, the hide, the head, the entrails, and meat trimmings such as skirt were given to the Mexican cowboys called vaqueros as part of their pay.

Hearty dishes like barbacoa de cabeza (barbecued head), menudo (tripe stew), and fajitas or arracheras (grilled skirt steak) have their roots in this practice. Considering the limited number of skirts per carcass and that the meat wasn't available commercially, the fajita tradition remained regional and relatively obscure for many years, probably only familiar to vaqueros, butchers, and their families. Modern "fajitas" were introduced at a county fair in Kyle, Texas in 1969 by Sonny Falcon, who later opened an Austin restaurant offering fajitas as a main fare.

Other dishes associated with Tex-Mex cooking include guacamole, chile con queso, tostadas with red salsa, tortilla soup, nachos, tacos, quesadillas, chimichangas, burritos, and carne guisada.

== Notable restaurants ==
Texas's Gulf Coast has several historic, iconic restaurants that were born from an immigrant fishing culture first established by Italians, Croatians, and Greeks in the early 1900s, and later developed by Vietnamese immigrants and Cajun neighbors (which has now created Viet-Cajun and Viet-Tex-Mex fusion cuisines). Galveston's Gaido's is the state's oldest seafood restaurant. It was founded in 1911 by Italian immigrant San Giacinto Gaido, and moved to its current location in 1941. Houston's oldest restaurant started in Galveston: Christie's Seafood and Steaks. It was founded in Galveston in 1917 by Greek immigrant Theodore Christie, and moved to Houston in 1934.

Many Vietnamese immigrants from the 1970s were attracted to the shrimping industry along the Gulf Coast, and subsequently also opened Vietnamese restaurants. In Houston, Vietnamese immigrants established Mai's in what was then a small Vietnamese community. Anthony Bourdain visited Mai's in 2015 and called it "the first great meal and most memorable great meal I had in Houston.... The first really authentic, 'just-like-Saigon' Vietnamese I'd had in America." A few years after Mai's opened, the iconic Kim Son opened with a Vietnamese and Chinese menu.

Lockhart, Texas is home to four barbecue restaurants that have a long legacy: Kreuz Market (pronounced 'Krites') was established in 1900, and Smitty's Market was spun out of Kreuz in 1999 after a family dispute that has now been reconciled. Black's Barbecue was established in 1932 (and has since also had divisions from family disputes), and Chisholm Trail Barbeque opened in 1978. Together, they have made Lockhart the "BBQ Capital of Texas," with an estimated 250,000 people visiting the four restaurants each year and some visitors participating in "BBQ crawls" to visit all four restaurants in a single day.

Texas's German immigrants established numerous breweries, restaurants, and biergartens, mostly in the Hill Country. Scholz Garten (1866) in Austin is the oldest operating biergarten in the United States, and because of its location in the state's capital and city of one of its largest public universities, it has had an outsized role in many historical events. Krause's Cafe and Biergarten (1938) in New Braunfels, Texas specializes in German-Texan cuisine. It was a central location for the town, with a stammtisch ("regulars' table") where city leaders met, but closed in 1995. It reopened in 2017, and supports German traditions in the city with live music and family-friendly events year-round. Der Lindenbaum, a renowned restaurant in Fredericksburg, Texas, focuses on authentic German cuisine. It was a favorite of Lady Bird Johnson. Chicken-fried steak is an important food in Texas, and some restaurants are known specifically for this dish, which came from German and Austrian immigrants who adapted their recipes for wiener schnitzel for Texas. One popular restaurant is Mary's, which is near Possum Kingdom Lake in Strawn, Texas. Another is O.S.T. Restaurant (1921) in Bandera, Texas which is on the proposed Old Spanish trail auto trail.

Texas has many notable steakhouses due to their cattle ranching heritage. Cattlemen's Steak House, established in 1947 in the Fort Worth Stockyards and became an institution; in 2025 it was renovated under new ownership. Big Texan Steak Ranch in Amarillo, Texas is home of the famous 72-ounce (about 2 kg) steak challenge: The $72 meal is free if the customer can eat the entire meal in one hour (it includes the steak, shrimp cocktail, baked potato, roll with butter, and a salad). The restaurant was established on Route 66 in 1960. They serve more than 600,000 people per year. Perini Ranch Steakhouse, established in 1983 in Buffalo Gap, Texas, is housed in a hay barn, has won a James Beard award, and was invited to cater an event at the White House for George W. Bush (the event was cancelled as it was scheduled for September 11, 2001).

Just as barbeque is throughout Texas but especially known in Lockhart, kolaches are found throughout Texas but especially in West, Texas, which is a community originating with many Czech immigrants. Texans often use the word "kolache" to refer to fruit-filled pastries as well as the sausage-filled ones that are more correctly called "klobásníki". Czech Stop and Little Czech Bakery, Slovacek, Village Bakery, and Gerik's Ole Czech Smokehouse and Bakery are the most-famous places for Texas kolaches.

Tex-Mex restaurants were operating in Texas at least by 1885, starting as outdoor tamale stands that moved indoors as a result of sanitation laws. The dishes became more standardized when Chicagoan Otis Farnsworth visited Mexican-owned restaurants in San Antonio and noted the long lines of Anglos. He soon opened the Original Mexican Restaurant in San Antonio: A Mexican restaurant designed for Anglos and staffed with Latinos, with the "Regular Supper" (a combination plate of enchiladas, tamales, rice, and beans). That successful formula led to many "Original Mexican" restaurants in Texas. Matt's El Rancho, established in 1952 in Austin, comes from the "Original" tradition: Matt Martinez's father ran a tamale cart before opening El Original in Austin in 1925. Lyndon B. Johnson used to enter the back door with his Secret Service detail to eat their chile relleno. The Original Mexican Eats Cafe in Fort Worth, now operating as The Original del Norte, notably was a favorite of the Roosevelt family, with Franklin D. Roosevelt ordering what's now called the "Roosevelt Special". Caro's Mexican Restaurant in Rio Grande City have served puffy tacos since 1937. Much later, Ninfa Rodriguez Laurenzo opened Ninfa's in Houston. Her signature dish was tacos al carbon, now called fajitas, which became wildly popular.

El Paso has a tradition of border Mexican food, which is different that the "Original" Tex-Mex template. Historic examples include L & J Cafe (established in 1927) and the now-closed H&H Car Wash and Coffee Shop, a James Beard award-winning place to eat a meal while you get a car wash. Historic restaurants offering traditional Mexican (not Tex-Mex) dishes include La Fonda on Main, established in San Antonio in 1930, and Mi Tierra, also in San Antonio, which opened in 1941.

Waco, Texas in particular has a strong collection of historic diners, burger joints, hangouts, and "comfort food" restaurants: the city has benefited from strong preservation efforts, and the family-owned eateries remain popular with Baylor University students and staff. Some of these diners include Cupp's Drive-Inn (1929) which started under the name Heating's Eatings and has been a favorite of Willie Nelson and Elvis Presley; George's (1930) which is known for its goblet of beer called the "Big O"; and Health Camp (1948) which started as a mobile canteen for military personnel. Outside of Waco but still in Central Texas are Margie's Bar & Grill (1924) in Bryan, Texas, which under its original name Opersteny Saloon became famous for its 2 oz. (57 g) hamburger; Bluebonnet Cafe (1929) in Marble Falls, Texas which has a Pie Happy Hour on weekdays; and Top Notch (1971), a drive-in with carhop service in Austin that was featured in the movies Dazed and Confused and Varsity Blues.

Several very successful chains have started in Texas, with some found exclusively in the state. Landry's was started by Bill and Floyd Landry as a group of Cajun restaurants. They later sold the company to Tilman Fertitta, who grew it into a corporation that includes hotels, casinos, and entertainment business throughout the US, including (in Texas) Landry's Seafood House at the Kemah Boardwalk and the controversial Downtown Aquarium in Houston. Pappas Restaurants is a group of different restaurants; the first opened in 1967. The group now includes multiple locations of Pappas Seafood House, Pappasito's Cantina, Pappadeaux Seafood Kitchen, and Pappas Brothers Steakhouse. Luby's Cafeteria started in Dallas in 1934, by a man whose father started a chain of cafeterias in Springfield, Missouri. At its height, it operated over 200 restaurants in 11 states.

Texas has also launched at least two donut franchises that have expanded outside Texas: Southern Maid Donuts and Shipley Do-Nuts. Other fast-food franchises that have grown popular outside the state include Church's Texas Chicken, Jason's Deli, Schlotzsky's, Whataburger, and Wingstop. The now defunct Kirby's Pig Stand was the first drive in restaurant in the United States and Pig Stand No. 7 in Houston was featured in the Terms of Endearment and The Evening Star novels and movies.

== Food and beverage industry ==
Dr Pepper was founded in Waco, Texas. The Spoetzl Brewery in Shiner, Texas is the oldest independent brewery in Texas, and produces Shiner Beers, including their flagship Shiner Bock. The frozen margarita machine was invented in Dallas by Mariano Martinez.

Frito-Lay is headquartered in Plano, Texas and Frito pie, a dish of Texas chili topped with corn chips and cheese, is a popular recipe to serve at large events.

Blue Bell Creameries is a famous ice-cream manufacturer founded and headquartered in Brenham, Texas.
