= Lovin' Molly =

1974 film by Sidney Lumet

- Theatrical release poster
- Directed by: Sidney Lumet
- Screenplay by: Stephen J. Friedman
- Based on: Leaving Cheyenne by Larry McMurtry
- Produced by: Stephen J. Friedman
- Starring: Anthony Perkins; Beau Bridges; Blythe Danner
- Cinematography: Edward R. Brown
- Edited by: Joanne Burke
- Music by: Fred Hellerman
- Production company: S.J.F. Productions
- Distributed by: Columbia Pictures
- Release date: April 14, 1974
- Running time: 98 minutes
- Country: United States
- Language: English
- Budget: $1.2 million

Lovin' Molly is a 1974 American drama film directed by Sidney Lumet and starring Anthony Perkins, Beau Bridges, Blythe Danner in the title role, Ed Binns, and Susan Sarandon. The film is based on Larry McMurtry's second novel, Leaving Cheyenne (1963). Prior to release, the film was also known as Molly, Gid, and Johnny and The Wild and The Sweet.

== Plot ==
Over a span of nearly 40 years, Gid and Johnny, a pair of Texas farm boys, compete for the affections of Molly Taylor, a free spirit who cares for both of them. The story is told in three consecutive segments, each narrated by one of the three lead roles.

The first segment is set in 1925 and narrated by Gid, who introduces himself as well as his best friend Johnny and Johnny's girlfriend Molly Taylor with whom Gid becomes smitten. Gid works part-time as a ranch hand at Molly's farm and often competes against Johnny for Molly's affections. Despite their frequent feud and arguments, Gid and Johnny's friendship never ends during their excursions and errands for Molly's father to sell and buy cattle for the family farm. Molly eventually sleeps with Gid, as well as Johnny, but she eventually chooses neither one of them and instead marries school friend Eddie after the death of her father. Gid eventually marries Sarah, a local widow with several children, and Johnny leaves town for places unknown.

The second segment is set in 1945 and is narrated by Molly. It was revealed that Molly had three sons from her three different suitors, and each one of them died in combat during World War II which is currently waging. Molly's husband Eddie also died from an illness several years before. Gid had divorced Sarah and began spending most of his free time with Molly, who withheld the news of their son's death in battle. When he finally did learn the news, Gid took it badly and became more depressed. Johnny re-entered their lives after living away and, having married and divorced his own wife, took a more active part in helping Molly run her late father's farm.

The third and final segment is set in 1964 and is narrated by Johnny. He reveals that Gid is in a local hospital dying from cancer and Johnny has been keeping a bedside vigil over him. Wanting out of the place, Johnny takes Gid away from the hospital for a few days to visit Molly who is still living at her father's farm and is contemplating selling it. After working with Johnny around the farm to relive their "good old days" long gone by, Gid passes away as Johnny is driving him back to the hospital. After Gid's funeral, Johnny meets with Molly where they agree that, despite never getting married or having a life in operating her family farm, they will always be soul mates, before Johnny leaves Molly for the last time.

== Cast ==
- Anthony Perkins as Gid Frye
- Beau Bridges as Johnny
- Blythe Danner as Molly Taylor
- Susan Sarandon as Sarah
- Edward Binns as Mr. Frye
- Conard Fowkes as Eddie White
- Claude Traverse as Mr. Taylor
- John Henry Faulk as Mr. Grinsom
- Richard Ray Lee as Sheriff (uncredited)
- Paul A. Partain as Willy (uncredited)

== Production ==
=== Development ===
Larry McMurtry's first novel, Horseman, Pass By had been turned into a successful 1963 film, Hud. In March 1966 The Los Angeles Times reported the film rights to Leaving Cheyenne, McMurtry's second novel, were purchased by Warner Bros for producer William Conrad, with Larry Marcus to write the script. McMurtry later says Warners wanted to call the film Gid, after the lead character Gideon, to cash in on the success of the movie Hud. The writer recalls, "Something like seven scripts ensued, one of them done by Robert Altman, another of them nursed along for years by Don Siegel. Insidiously unfilmic, the book resisted all but the most foolhardy efforts to drag it onto celluloid, until, in 1974, it finally succumbed to the abundantly foolhardy efforts of Stephen Friedman and Sidney Lumet and appeared as Lovin' Molly".

In June 1969 it was announced Don Siegel would produce a version of the book in Oklahoma, with filming to start in October of that year. However this did not proceed.

Film rights were eventually obtained by Stephen J. Friedman, a lawyer who had moved into producing with the 1971 film version of McMurtry's The Last Picture Show. (Friedman appears to have bought them off Universal Studios, who got them from Warner Bros.) Friedman was an admirer of Leaving Cheyenne calling it "full of extraordinary insights into people". He particularly appreciated how "the men have to adapt to the women in the story. Usually it's the other way around."

Friedman had not been involved in the writing or casting of Last Picture Show. He decided to adapt Leaving Cheyenne into a screenplay himself. He said that despite the success of Last Picture Show at the box office he had as much trouble raising finance for Leaving Cheyenne as he did for Picture Show. "It's still difficult to convince the industry that films about love and humanity and people will be as grabbing as lustful, violent action drama," he said. Finance was eventually raised independently although Columbia Pictures - which had made The Last Picture Show - later picked up the film for release.

Friedman said the title was changed from Leaving Cheyenne after "we took a survey and found that most people expected it to be a Western. It's about people and we didn't want to attract people that wanted a simple action movie and got a sensitive drama."

Friedman says Sidney Lumet was the third director he approached to make the film. "He doesn't like to typecast he likes to cast people in the opposite of their type," said Friedman. "It's a challenge to him, it's a challenge to the performer. That's the kind of concern I was looking for in this picture. It was set in Texas but could have happened anywhere. The people are more important than the film"

At one stage the filmmakers considered using three different actors to play the characters during three different timelines but eventually decided to use the same actors and make up. (Friedman later said the film should have just used two timelines.)

In an interview with one of the actors in the film, Paul Partain (better known for his role in The Texas Chain Saw Massacre) described the origins of the film:

When Sidney [Lumet] and producer Stephen J. Friedman got into town, they came with what they hoped would be the perfect formula for success. It had worked on The Last Picture Show, and they knew it would work here. It was this: get a Larry McMurtry novel, hire your three lead actors from Hollywood, get a great director, pick up all the rest of the actors and the crew from the local pool and you were set. Great plan, and it almost worked ...

=== Shooting ===
Female star Blythe Danner started rehearsing for the movie twelve days after having given birth to her daughter Gwyneth Paltrow.

Filming started on November 6, 1972, under the working title Molly, Gid and Johnny in Bastrop, Texas. The unit stayed at Bastrop until December 8, after which there was two weeks of filming on a set in New York.

The filming was witnessed by a Texan journalist who later wrote a 1974 Texas Monthly article about it. Lumet directed this film during a span when his Serpico, Murder on the Orient Express, Dog Day Afternoon, Network and Equus were nominated for a combined 27 Academy Awards. McMurtry has claimed to have hated the movie as it wasn't very true to his book and says that it "just about killed his father."

Lumet said:

There were so many problems with that film! First, I should have taken a year to prepare it, because I wasn't at all familiar with life down South. I should have researched it more. It was an independent film, with little financing, so we had to shoot quickly, and that's why the makeup, for example, is not all that convincing. Anyway, it was a failure, due in great part to my haste.

McMurtry felt Lumet's "indifference to locale was so total that one is sorry he was put to the anguish of uprooting himself from home and hearth for even the few short weeks he could bring himself to stay in Texas." He added "indifference to detail, on the scale to which it is evident in Lovin' Molly, adds up to indifference to substance."

== Reception ==
Variety called the film "a misguided, heavy-handed attempt to span 40 years in the lives of three Texas rustics and their bizarre but homey menage a trois. Despite some good performances, pic just doesn't work, and b.o. prospects are dim... If the basic concept is arguably unfilmable, Lumet's execution of it is haphazard. Early sequences are surprisingly sloppy (mismatched shots etc.) and overall direction is lacklustre."

Kevin Thomas of The Los Angeles Times wrote, "Perkins is expressive and incisive in one of the richest roles he's ever had" but felt the film "leaves one with the impression that we'd be better off having read McMurtry's book."

Sight and Sound wrote, "Imagine Jules and Jim transplanted to rural Texas, with destructive Catherine replaced by constructive Molly, and you arrive at the thematic basis of this adaptation... Unlikely as it sounds, Anthony Perkins, Beau Bridges and Blythe Danner as the lovable trio come dangerously close to making it work."

Jonathan Rosenbaum, in Monthly Film Bulletin, called the movie:

A kind of rural Carnal Knowledge, with the lives of three characters split into discrete and isolated episodes from which the physical fact of their environment is virtually stripped away. (The film was shot on location, but for all that Sidney Lumet makes of the terrain, he might as well have used a sound stage.) To compound difficulties, we have three evidently urban actors out to impersonate country folk... straining after verisimilitude and continuity all along the way. And yet... the film gets away with a lot more than one would have any right to expect... the cumulative impact of the three leads often persuades one to forget the quaint precocity of the material with which they are working.

In a 1975 review of the film Hearts of the West Pauline Kael referred to Lovin' Molly which she called "crudely made, but there were suggestive spaces in it - you couldn't tie it all up. Danner's full-blown, straightforward Molly, who didn't worry about being conventional, because conventions meant nothing to her, was like a Hardy heroine — Eustacia Vye, or Tess — growing up in Texas. I thought Blythe Danner was going to become a great movie star, but Lovin’ Molly got measly distribution and vanished, and stars aren't made by flop movies."

Critic Danny Peary wrote, "Film reputedly has a cult following, but I have never come across a true fan. However, if you're a Blythe Danner fan and consequently regret that she didn't make it as a ticket-selling leading lady, this is the picture that proves she had the beauty and talent to have been a star if she'd been promoted properly."

== See also ==
- List of American films of 1974
