= The Evening Star =

- Theatrical release poster
- Directed by: Robert Harling
- Screenplay by: Robert Harling
- Based on: The Evening Star by Larry McMurtry
- Produced by: David Kirkpatrick; Polly Platt; Keith Samples
- Starring: Shirley MacLaine; Bill Paxton; Juliette Lewis; Miranda Richardson; Ben Johnson; Scott Wolf; George Newbern; Marion Ross; Mackenzie Astin; Donald Moffat; Jack Nicholson
- Cinematography: Don Burgess
- Edited by: David Moritz
- Music by: William Ross
- Production company: Rysher Entertainment
- Distributed by: Paramount Pictures
- Release date: December 25, 1996
- Running time: 129 minutes
- Country: United States
- Language: English
- Budget: $25 million
- Box office: $12.8 million

The Evening Star is a 1996 American comedy drama film directed by Robert Harling, adapted from the 1992 novel by Larry McMurtry. It is a sequel to the Academy Award-winning 1983 film Terms of Endearment starring Shirley MacLaine, who reprises the role of Aurora Greenway, for which she won an Oscar in the original film.

Taking place about thirteen years after the original, following the characters from 1988 to 1993, the plot focuses on Aurora's relationship with her three grandchildren, her late daughter Emma's best friend Patsy and her longtime housekeeper Rosie. Along the way, Aurora enters into a relationship with a younger man, while watching the world around her change as old friends pass on and her grandchildren make lives of their own.

Miranda Richardson co-stars alongside Juliette Lewis, Marion Ross, Bill Paxton, and Ben Johnson in his final film role before his death; the film is dedicated to him. Jack Nicholson returns in an extended cameo appearance, reprising his role from Terms of Endearment.

The Evening Star was released by Paramount Pictures on December 25, 1996. Unlike its predecessor, The Evening Star received negative reviews from critics and was a box office bomb, grossing $12.8 million against a $25 million budget.

== Plot ==
Several years have passed since the death of Aurora Greenway's daughter, Emma. Aurora continues to care for the three grandchildren she raised after Emma's death. Her eldest grandson, Tommy, is serving a prison sentence for a drug-related offense.

Younger grandson Teddy now has a girlfriend and a son, neither of whom Aurora warms to. Melanie, the youngest, is still living with Aurora but giving serious thought to moving out. Aurora's only true companion is housekeeper Rosie, particularly now that a man she's been spending time with, the General, is a friend, not a romance.

Her late daughter's old friend, Patsy, still has a home in Houston and thinks of herself as Aurora's friend now, dispensing advice to Melanie, something that Aurora does not appreciate. Though she caught her boyfriend cheating on her and tries to overdose on Patsy's muscle relaxants, Melanie moves to Los Angeles with the same boyfriend after he pleads with her for a fresh start.

Meanwhile, Rosie is being courted by an elderly gentleman named Arthur, who has bought astronaut Garrett Breedlove's former house next door. On seeing how lonely Aurora is, Rosie tricks her into seeing a licensed counselor, Jerry, to whom Aurora admits that she is still seeking "the love of my life." She starts to chronicle her life in scrapbooks, which helps her loneliness.

Jerry and Aurora begin a romantic relationship; however, Jerry also has a fling with Patsy, which Aurora discovers. Aurora ends the relationship after learning it centers around Jerry's long-unresolved Oedipus complex issues.

After many visits to Tommy in prison, Aurora finally reaches him through scrapbook pages of him with his mother Emma when he was a child. This helps to heal his anger and mend the broken relationship with his grandmother.

Needing a new cause, Aurora takes charge after Melanie decides to stay in Los Angeles to try to become an actress, her boyfriend having left her for another woman. Aurora is peeved to discover that Patsy has the same idea. Melanie lands a role on a television show, which Aurora and Patsy celebrate, but they have a fight on the flight home.

When Aurora comes home, however, she learns that Rosie is critically ill. She is left once more facing the prospect of being alone. Against Arthur's wishes, Aurora carries Rosie 'home' to the Greenway house and tends to her lovingly until Rosie eventually succumbs to her illness. Arthur brings Rosie's ashes to Aurora, asking her to do what she feels would be best for Rosie's memory.

A few days later, Aurora is writing in her diary in her backyard gazebo alongside Rosie's urn when Garrett surprises her. This visit cheers her up immensely and seems to rejuvenate her spirits; she confides that she's still searching for her one true love, and Garrett advises her to find that true love soon because "there aren't that many shopping days left till Christmas."

Tommy is released from prison and he and Aurora embrace at the prison exit where she has arrived to take him home. He lands a promising job after taking computer classes in prison, and he and his new girlfriend start a family and get married. Their child, Henry, is doted upon by Aurora, who starts teaching him music lessons.

Scrapbooks continue to be filled year by year, until one day Aurora suffers a stroke while teaching Henry the piano; this slows her but also brings the family closer together, with Patsy spending her days tending to Aurora's needs and the rest of the family close by. She and Patsy make peace with each other at last, apologizing for so many years of battling when both loved the same family so fiercely. At Christmastime, Aurora is bedridden and surrounded by her grandchildren and friends as she dies, calling out softly to Emma. The ending scene features young Henry playing the familiar theme from Terms of Endearment on the piano as Tommy sits beside him.

== Cast ==
- Shirley MacLaine as Aurora Greenway
- Bill Paxton as Jerry Bruckner
- Juliette Lewis as Melanie Horton
- Miranda Richardson as Patsy Carpenter
- Ben Johnson as Arthur Cotton
- Scott Wolf as Bruce Burgess
- George Newbern as Tommy Horton
- Marion Ross as Rosie Dunlop
- Mackenzie Astin as Teddy Horton
- Donald Moffat as Hector Scott
- Jack Nicholson as Garrett Breedlove
- China Kantner as Jane
- Jennifer Grant as Ellen
- Jake Langerud as Henry

== Production ==
In November 1992, it was announced Paramount Pictures and producer David Kirkpatrick had begun development on The Evening Star, with Robert Harling writing a screenplay based on the novel by Larry McMurtry, his follow-up to Terms of Endearment. Shirley MacLaine was confirmed to reprise her Academy Award winning role of Aurora Greenway; despite the critical and commercial success of Terms of Endearment, Paramount wouldn't commit to buying until Maclaine had signed on. Jack Nicholson was reported to be interested in reprising his role of Garrett Breedlove, contingent upon quality of the script.

In November 1993, it was announced that Frank Oz was in negotiations to serve as the film's director. James L. Brooks, who had directed Terms of Endearment, was asked to return but felt there was nothing in the material that wasn't covered in the first film. By February 1994, both Juliette Lewis and Gwyneth Paltrow were being considered for the role of Melanie Horton; however, production had been delayed due to a lawsuit brought by Kirkpatrick against Paramount. He alleged that following his ouster from the studio, he had been told that he could continue as producer on the films he was developing, including this film and The Brady Bunch Movie, but that Paramount later reneged on the deal. It was further alleged that then-Paramount president Stanley R. Jaffe had stonewalled green lighting Kirkpatrick's projects due to clashes the two had experienced working together on the film School Ties and only greenlit The Evening Star after Kirkpatrick was in the process of vacating the Paramount lot.

In September 1995, it was reported that Rysher Entertainment would produce and finance the film for Paramount, with both MacLaine and Lewis set to star and screenwriter Harling taking over as director. Kirkpatrick was confirmed as producer, alongside Polly Platt, who had worked on Terms as production designer and had been the executive vice president of Brooks' production company Gracie Films.

Production had started in Houston by January 1996, with Nicholson in final negotiations to return as Breedlove. MacLaine suffered a 102-degree flu fever on set, and was given a filming day with no dialogue.

== Release ==
The film was released theatrically on December 25, 1996. It opened tenth in the box office, taking in $3.3 million from 1,265 screens. The film was released on home video on May 6, 1997.

== Reception ==
Unlike Terms of Endearment, the film was not a box-office success, grossing only $12,767,815 (unadjusted) and received poor reviews from critics. On Rotten Tomatoes it holds a 20% rating from 35 reviews with the consensus: "Even taken on its own terms, there's nothing terribly endearing about this belated sequel." Audiences surveyed by CinemaScore gave the film a grade "A−" on scale of A to F.

Roger Ebert, in his Chicago Sun-Times review of December 27, 1996, described The Evening Star as "a completely unconvincing sequel", awarding it one-and-a-half stars of a possible four. He said the story lacks any points of interest, and found the character developments contrived and clunky.

Mick LaSalle, in a December 25 San Francisco Chronicle review, similarly said that the film lacks a story and instead "is constructed as a series of incidents involving Aurora and her family." He praised Shirley MacLaine's performance but derided the characterizations and overall tedium of the film, summing it up as "one of the worst films of the year".

Ebert and LaSalle both criticized the numerous character deaths, interpreting them as a desperate attempt to maintain the viewer's interest.
