= The Last Kind Words Saloon =

2014 novel by Larry McMurtry

- Author: Larry McMurtry
- Language: English
- Genre: Western
- Publisher: Boni & Liveright
- Publication date: 2014
- Publication place: United States
- Pages: 196 (first edition)
- ISBN: 978-0871407863
- OCLC: 871219501
- Dewey Decimal: 813/.54
- LC Class: PS3563.A319

The Last Kind Words Saloon is a 2014 American novel by Larry McMurtry. It focuses on Wyatt Earp and Doc Holliday and ends with the gunfight at the O.K. Corral.

== Background ==
The Last Kind Words Saloon was McMurtry's first novel in five years. It was also his first book published by Liveright after more than forty years with Simon & Schuster. McMurtry told The Wall Street Journal that the retirement of his longtime editor Michael Korda was the impetus for the change. He also felt that Simon & Schuster was too focused on producing more Lonesome Dove sequels. McMurtry said he wrote the novel in approximately three weeks.

== Reception ==
Publishers Weekly said, "McMurtry's treatment of the Old West's most famous gunfight is abrupt and unconvincing, taking just eight uninspired sentences to describe. This revisionist western plays loose with historical facts, and is a disappointing effort from a Pulitzer Prize–winning author."

Kirkus Reviews said, "Not quite in the class of Lonesome Dove, The Last Picture Show, or other top-shelf McMurtry, but still a lot of fun. "
