= Texasville (novel) =

1987 novel by Larry McMurtry

- Author: Larry McMurtry
- Language: English
- Set in: Thalia, Texas
- Publication date: 1987
- Publication place: USA
- Preceded by: The Last Picture Show
- Followed by: Duane's Depressed

Texasville is an American novel by Larry McMurtry, first published by Simon & Schuster in 1987. It is a sequel to his 1966 novel The Last Picture Show, and features several of the same characters years later in the same fictional town of Thalia, which is based on McMurtry's hometown of Archer City, Texas. The protagonist, Duane Moore, is the now middle-aged owner of several oil wells, while married to Karla and the father of several children. He is thrown off balance when his high school sweet heart, Jacy, returns to town. The novel was adapted into the 1990 film of the same name.

== Premise ==
Duane Moore, from McMurtry's earlier novel The Last Picture Show, is now in his late forties and still living in the fictional town of Thalia, based on Archer City, Texas. Set in 1986, the town is reeling from the drop in the price of oil, threatening bankruptcy for many residents, including Duane, who got rich from mineral wealth. Duane is often melancholy and faced with challenges on several fronts: his declining oil business, his troublesome children, and his polyamorous marriage to Karla. Duane's old girlfriend, Jacy, returns to town, and he helps to plan for the town's centennial festival.

== Conception ==
McMurtry described the novel as focusing on "the famous oil boom of the 70s, which described the excesses of human folly as I witnessed them in Archer City and the homes of my siblings as the irresistible notion of riches came to race through and desiccate the town, all despite that the history of booms is well known. " He added, "I thought the whole bust to boom and back to bust was hilarious and so described it in Texasville. I don’t think it’s much of a novel." However, McMurtry said "The book did fairly well, mainly because it came close on the heels of Lonesome Dove."

== Sequels and adaptations ==
There were three more sequels: Duane's Depressed, When the Light Goes and Rhino Ranch: A Novel. McMurtry later wrote, " I never thought of Duane as me. Except for a handful of passages — the chapters in Duane’s Depressed that describe his depression — the books aren’t autobiographical. He doesn’t know what I know, despite having been forced by his analyst to read Proust."

== Reception ==
In The New York Times, Andy Greenwald described Texasville as entertaining, writing: "The breathless pace of the book, which is cut into 98 chapters as skinny and potent as cocaine, is thrilling." Writing for The Washington Post, Jonathan Yardley praised the novel for its "energy, humor and passion", while noting the lengthy and meandering plot.

== Notes ==
- McMurtry, Larry (2009). Literary Life: A Second Memoir. Simon & Schuster.
- McMurtry, Larry (2010). Hollywood: A Third Memoir. Simon & Schuster.
