= Telegraph Days =

2006 novel by Larry McMurtry

- Author: Larry McMurtry
- Language: English
- Genre: Western
- Publisher: Simon & Schuster
- Publication date: 2006
- Publication place: United States
- Pages: 289
- ISBN: 978-0743250788
- OCLC: 62325167
- Dewey Decimal: 813/.54
- LC Class: PS3563.A319 T38 2006

Telegraph Days is a novel by Larry McMurtry that was first published by Simon & Schuster in 2006. The book, McMurtry's 29th novel, follows the adventures of an intelligent and headstrong woman, Nellie Courtright, in the American Old West. McMurtry satirizes Nellie's encounters with several notable figures, including Buffalo Bill, Wyatt Earp, and Billy the Kid. The book is a satirical portrayal of the Old West.

== Plot ==
=== Book 1: Yazee days ===
Nellie and her brother, Jackson, discover that their father hung himself in the barn. The two young siblings are the last remaining members of the Courtright family, which had migrated from Virginia to Oklahoma. Following their father's suicide, Nellie and Jackson move to Rita Blanca, a small nearby town. Nellie secures a job for her brother as the deputy sheriff and a job for herself as the telegraphist. Shortly after their arrival, the Yazee gang, consisting of six outlaw brothers, descends on the town. Jackson fires six lucky shots, killing each member of the gang.

=== Book 2: Telegraph days ===
The residents of Rita Blanca seek to capitalize on the attention brought by Jackson’s destruction of the Yazee Gang. The local storeowner plans to create a museum and to charge reporters for interviews. Nellie writes a book on the shootout, called the Banditti of No Man's Land. She and Jackson travel to Dodge City to print the book, where they encounter Wyatt Earp and his brothers. Back in Rita Blanca, Nellie begins an on-again, off-again relationship with one of the reporters, Zenas Clark.

=== Book 3: Wild west days ===
Buffalo Bill Cody comes to Rita Blanca in search of material for his Wild West Show. Cody is taken by Nelly's intelligence and her ability to organize, and he hires her to manage his affairs. Nelly trains a former whore to serve as the telegraphist for Rita Blanca in her stead, and she travels to North Platte, Nebraska, the home of Cody. Cody gives Nelly power of attorney to manage his affairs while he pursues the development of his Wild West Show. Nelly oversees Cody's cattle, household, and finances.

=== Book 4: Tombstone days and book 5: California days ===
Nellie decides to move back to Rita Blanca after growing bored as a manager for Cody. She becomes the mayor of the town for six months. During this stint as mayor, she meets Billy the Kid when he passes through the town. Nelly next joins Zenas in Tombstone, Arizona, where they run a newspaper. Nelly reports on the gunfight at the O.K. Corral involving the Earp Brothers, Doc Holliday, and the Cochise County Cowboys. Nellie and Zenas move to California to establish another newspaper; they have 6 daughters. Zenas disappears while attempting to sail around the world. Nellie prospers in business and societal affairs. A Hollywood producer approaches Nellie about making a movie of her life in Rita Blanca, called Telegraph Days.

== Reception ==
Kirkus Reviews wrote that "Though the novel ultimately covers a lot of territory, this isn't a return to the Oscar-winner's epic sweep of Lonesome Dove, but it’s an easy, breezy read." In The Washington Post, Sandra Dallas wrote: "Telegraph Days is no Pulitzer contender, but it's still a darn good read". Other reviewers noted the novel's subversion of the mythologized West. Cheryl Miller of the Hoover Institution wrote that the novel "belongs to the parodic vein of his Western writing, cheerily upending every legend it can lay hands on".

== Notes ==
- McMurtry, Larry (2009). Literary Life: A Second Memoir. Simon & Schuster.
- McMurtry, Larry (2010). Hollywood. Simon & Schuster.
