= The Wandering Hill =

2003 novel by Larry McMurtry

- Author: Larry McMurtry
- Language: English
- Series: Berrybender Narratives
- Publisher: Simon & Schuster
- Publication date: 2003
- Publication place: USA
- Preceded by: Sin Killer
- Followed by: By Sorrow's River

The Wandering Hill is a novel by Larry McMurtry published in 2003. It is the second, both in chronological and publishing order, of The Berrybender Narratives. Set in 1833, it recounts the Berrybenders' journey up the Yellowstone River into the Rocky Mountains.

The title refers to a sinister-looking movable hill in Native American legend. The hill is said to appear at scenes of great tragedy, and is meant to symbolize the ill-conceived and ominous choices the Berrybenders are beginning to make.

== Reception ==
Publishers Weekly said "McMurtry tosses in famous hunters and mountain men like Hugh Glass, Kit Carson and Tom Fitzpatrick, plus a buffalo stampede, grizzly bears and an Indian ambush, but these are just props to support the soap-opera antics of the Berrybender clan. A few folks manage to get themselves killed, but there are plenty of annoying Englishmen left to people the next two volumes."

Kirkus wrote "Big issues masquerading as light fun. Highly entertaining."
