= Somebody's Darling (novel) =

1978 novel by Larry McMurtry

- Author: Larry McMurtry
- Language: English
- Genre: Hollywood novel
- Publisher: Simon & Schuster
- Publication date: 1978
- Pages: 347 (hardcover first edition)
- ISBN: 0671243942
- Preceded by: All My Friends Are Going to Be Strangers
- Followed by: Some Can Whistle

Somebody's Darling is a 1978 novel by American writer Larry McMurtry. The novel, set in Hollywood, follows a director, Jill Peel. Peel navigates directing a movie full of eccentric characters. The novel is part of McMurtry's Houston series, which follows a recurring mix of characters in Houston. It reviewed mixed reviews from critics.

== Conception ==
McMurtry later wrote "By the time of Somebody’s Darling I had been working in Hollywood nearly twenty years and I still didn’t know enough about the town to write a wholly convincing book about it. The book has its moments, but these are scattered; the recollections of the old screenwriter Joe Percy are my favorite parts, now that I too, like Joe, have become an old screenwriter."

McMurtry tried for several years to have a film financed with Diane Keaton. He later wrote: "nothing cinematic came of this except a great friendship. Somebody’s Darling is a Hollywood novel—it went nowhere because of Hollywood’s persistent dislike of itself as a subject."

== Reception ==
In a review for The New York Times, Christopher Lehmann-Haupt gave the book a mixed review. He praised the development of the characters but criticized the aimless nature of the plot. Lehmann-Haupt wrote: "The trouble is that the characters keep kicking over the traces of the plots and themes. It's just as well they do. It's what makes them so appealing." Kirkus Reviews called it an "imperfect but lovable book."

In 2005, McMurtry said that he viewed Somebody's Darling as his "worst book".

== Notes ==
- McMurtry, Larry (2009). Literary Life: A Second Memoir. Simon & Schuster.
- McMurtry, Larry (2010). Hollywood. Simon & Schuster.
