= Leaving Cheyenne =

1963 novel by Larry McMurtry

- First edition
- Author: Larry McMurtry
- Language: English
- Series: Thalia: A Texas Trilogy
- Genre: Fiction
- Publisher: Harper & Row
- Publication date: 1963
- Publication place: United States
- Pages: 298 (hardcover first edition)
- ISBN: 0140052216 (1979 Penguin edition)
- Preceded by: Horseman, Pass By
- Followed by: The Last Picture Show

Leaving Cheyenne is the second novel written by author Larry McMurtry. It was published in 1963. The novel portrays the lives of people living in Texas from about 1920 to about 1965.

Leaving Cheyenne is written in three parts. Each is a first person account from one of the main characters involved in a life-long love triangle: Gideon, Johnny, and Molly.

The novel was adapted into the 1974 film Lovin' Molly, starring Anthony Perkins and Beau Bridges.

== Film adaptation ==
Film rights to the novel were purchased by Warner Bros. in 1964. McMurtry says Warner wanted to call the film Gid, after the lead character Gideon, to cash in on the success of the 1963 movie Hud, based on McMurty's first novel, Horseman, Pass By. McMurtry said, "Something like seven scripts ensued, one of them done by Robert Altman, another of them nursed along for years by Don Siegel. Insidiously unfilmic, the book resisted all but the most foolhardy efforts to drag it onto celluloid, until, in 1974, it finally succumbed to the abundantly foolhardy efforts of Stephen Friedman and Sidney Lumet and appeared as Lovin' Molly".
