= Duane's Depressed =

1999 novel by Larry McMurtry

- Author: Larry McMurtry
- Language: English
- Series: Duane Moore
- Set in: Texas
- Publisher: Simon & Schuster
- Publication date: 1999
- Pages: 431
- ISBN: 068485497X
- Dewey Decimal: 813/.54
- LC Class: 98045712
- Preceded by: Texasville
- Followed by: When the Light Goes

Duane's Depressed is a 1999 American novel by Larry McMurtry. McMurtry said it was the favorite book he had written, along with Terms of Endearment.

It is the third in a series of novels about Duane Moore from The Last Picture Show. McMurtry later wrote, "I never thought of Duane as me. Except for a handful of passages — the chapters in Duane’s Depressed that describe his depression — the books aren’t autobiographical. He doesn’t know what I know, despite having been forced by his analyst to read Proust."

== Reception ==
Kirkus Reviews wrote "There’s a scarcity of story here, but McMurtry obviously enjoys these folks so much he can’t resist hanging out with them for 400-plus pages. You probably won’t be able to either."

The New York Times wrote that:

Duane's Depressed is guilty of neither the self-indulgence nor the sentimentality a less poised writer than McMurtry might have allowed himself in the last book of a trilogy he had lived with for so many years. Indeed, he proves again that he is as clear-eyed a writer as anyone in the business. He understands counterpoint wonderfully, knows when to balance pathos with humor, irony with admiration. But he does allow himself to get away with some things he shouldn't. At times the book's plot seems forced: certain deaths happen too neatly, as if McMurtry felt the need to leave a tidy house behind at trilogy's end.

== Notes ==
- McMurtry, Larry (2009). Literary Life: A Second Memoir. Simon & Schuster.
- McMurtry, Larry (2010). Hollywood. Simon & Schuster.
