= All My Friends Are Going to Be Strangers =

1972 novel by Larry McMurtry

- Author: Larry McMurtry
- Language: English
- Series: Houston
- Publisher: Simon & Schuster
- Publication date: 1972
- Pages: 286 (first hardcover edition)
- ISBN: 0671211609
- Dewey Decimal: 813/.54
- LC Class: PS3563.A319 A79 2018
- Preceded by: Moving On
- Followed by: Terms of Endearment

All My Friends Are Going to Be Strangers is a 1972 American novel by Larry McMurtry. The work, his fifth novel, follows the travails and romantic entanglements of a young writer, Danny Deck. The events of the novel primarily take place in Houston, Texas and San Francisco.

McMurtry later wrote it was not until the book was published "that I became convinced that I was a writer and would remain one." He wrote it in five weeks after finishing his fourth novel, Moving On. In 2009, McMurtry said, "The book was then and probably still remains the best entry point to my fiction, mainly because I was too tired to feel in the least self-conscious. I just spewed it out, and never, until now, looked back. All My Friends still reads well."

All My Friends Are Going to Be Strangers is the second in McMurtry's Houston series, a collection of six loosely related novels set primarily in contemporary Houston. Some of the characters in the novel also appear in Terms of Endearment (1975) and The Evening Star (1992).

== Plot ==
The novel follows a young author, Danny Deck, as he navigates writing and relationships. Deck is a graduate student when he meets Sally. They have a tumultuous relationship, with Sally becoming pregnant before they acrimoniously separate. Deck engages in relationships with several other women, including a famous novelist, a cartoonist, his best friend's wife, and a Mexican prostitute. In between these relationships, he publishes his first novel and writes a second, while trying to figure out the direction of his life.

== Reception ==
The Miami Herald called it "nearly a great book". Reviewing the book for The New York Times, critic Jim Harrison described the novel "is a much more powerful demonstration of this “memorable” aspect in McMurtry's work... It is a desperate and intimidating work and you are liable to finish with relief and then pick it up several days later to see if the man really said what he did."

== Adaptations ==
No film version has been made, although in 2009 McMurtry wrote: " It has been scripted about a dozen times. Musicians, particularly, seem to like it. James Taylor had it under option for a while, as did the Eagles."

== Notes ==
- McMurtry, Larry (2009). Literary Life: A Second Memoir. Simon & Schuster.
