= Crazy Horse: A Life =

1999 book by Larry McMurtry

- Cover of Crazy Horse: A Life
- Author: Larry McMurtry
- Language: English
- Subject: Crazy Horse (Lakota leader)
- Genre: Biography
- Publisher: Penguin Books
- Publication date: 1999
- Publication place: United States

Crazy Horse: A Life is a 1999 American book by Larry McMurtry about Crazy Horse. It is a "short life" book. McMurtry was offered to do one on Custer but did Crazy Horse instead.

== Background ==
McMurtry wrote Crazy Horse following a period of literary malaise, precipitated by heart bypass surgery. A profile in The Wall Street Journal noted that he "recovered a sense of himself as a writer only after he began" working on the book, writing by long hand.

== Reception ==
Peter Aykroyd of The New York Times wrote "Crazy Horse remains a figure trapped in a history that he himself only partly understood, and the narrative must essentially remain at the level of supposition rather than of truth. McMurtry is good at the less intimate moments, however, when he suggests that mutual incomprehension between white settlers and Indians led to sporadic and at first inconclusive warfare. And this apparently objective story is striated with the gleams and intimations of the novelist shrouded within the biographer."
