= Boone's Lick (novel) =

2000 novel by Larry McMurtry

- Author: Larry McMurtry
- Language: English
- Publisher: Simon & Schuster
- Publication date: January 1, 2000
- Publication place: US
- Pages: 287
- ISBN: 0684868865
- OCLC: 44517986
- Dewey Decimal: 813/.54
- LC Class: PS3563.A319 B6 2000

Boone's Lick is a novel by American author Larry McMurtry, first published by Simon & Schuster in 2000. The novel follows a family that travels from Boone's Lick Missouri to Wyoming. Set in the wake of the Civil War, the tale is narrated by a 15-year old boy, Shay Cecil. The narrative includes a depiction of the Fetterman Massacre and an appearance by Wild Bill Hickok. Critics viewed the book less favorably than McMurtry's other works, though it garnered some praise for its prose and characters. Filmmakers have considered adaptations of the novel.

== Plot ==
The novel is a coming-of-age story, told in the first person and set shortly after the end of the American Civil War. The protagonist, 15-year-old Sherman ("Shay") Cecil lives in Boonslick, along the Missouri River, with his three younger siblings, his mother, grandfather, and uncle. Shay's father is regularly absent, while working as a freight hauler to forts in the North. Shay's mother, Mary Margaret, manages the household with her brother-in-law, Seth. Shay wonders about the nature of the close relationship between his mother and Uncle Seth. The family lives in difficult conditions, often habitually hungry, leading Mary Margaret to shoot a horse for the family to eat. They have several mules that they use to make a living.

Shay and his brother, G.T., get a taste of adventure when their Uncle Seth allows them to join a posse to track down a group of outlaws bothering the town. Wild Bill Hickok, a friend of Seth, also participates. After the apprehension of the outlaws, Mary Margaret decides that she wants to leave Boone's Lick to search for her husband. Shay is reluctant to leave but excited about the journey. The family load all their belongings into a wagon to travel north on a flatbed boat. The party includes Shay's grandfather; Aunt Rosie a local prostitute; Charlie Seven Days, an Indian who serves as their guide; and Villy, an itinerant priest. Early in the journey, a huge storm disrupts their progress, and the grandfather is lost overboard. Charlie Seven Days, Villy, and Aunt Rosie disembark at various points along the way.

Shay and his family encounters challenges along the way when traveling by wagon. They encounter friendly Pawnee Indians, a grizzly bear, and soldiers. After traveling for several months, they make their way to Fort Laramie, where they find Shay's father, Dick Cecil. Cecil has several other families with Indian women at various forts. Mary Margaret tells him she is quitting him and partners with Seth. While staying at the fort, Shay observes the Fetterman Massacre. The epilogue of the book finds that Mary Margaret and Seth build a life together in Missouri, while Shay purses a legal career, eventually becoming a judge for the Missouri Territory.

== Reception ==
Mark Busby of The Austin Chronicle reviewed the novel positively, writing: "For the thousands of readers who have read his fiction over the years, even a slighter work like Boone's Lick offers riches". Busby, however, noted that several of the interesting secondary characters in the novel, such as Charlie Seven Days, only made fleeting appearances in the novel. In a mixed review for The New York Times, Karen Karbo praised McMurtry's writing, describing some of the prose as "colloquial, poetic, gently elegiac", while criticizing the choice of Shay as the narrator. In Karbo's view, Shay cannot effectively capture the love story between Mary Margaret and Seth: "There's little heat between them. Or at least none to which we, though [sic] Shay's eyes, are privy".

Publishers Weekly said "More an amusing fable of family strife than a serious story with memorable characters, this piece does not approach the substance or quality of McMurtry's better works, but his ardent fans will undoubtedly appreciate the warmth, compassion and humor that the narrative exudes." In January Magazine, J. Kingston Pierce wrote: "What is remarkable, however, is how little interest McMurtry manages to drum up over so many fictionalized miles." In another mixed review, Troy Patterson of Entertainment Weekly said "Though 'Boone's Lick' lacks the proportions its epic setting suggests, at least there's fine poetry on the human scale."

== Adaptation ==
The actor Tom Hanks considered developing a movie based on the novel, after reading the work while on a camping trip in Idaho. Barry Levinson became attached to project as a director, with plans for Hanks and Julianne Moore to costar, but after languishing in development hell, the movie never got made.
