= Folly and Glory =

2004 novel by Larry McMurtry

- First edition (publ. Simon & Schuster)
- Author: Larry McMurtry
- Series: The Berrybender Narratives
- Publisher: Simon & Schuster
- Publication date: May 1, 2004
- ISBN: 0-7432-3305-0

Folly and Glory (2004) is a novel by Larry McMurtry. It is the fourth and last, both in chronological and publishing order, of The Berrybender Narratives. Set in the years 1835 and 1836, it completes the Berrybenders' North American adventure by sending them from Santa Fe to the disease-ridden and war-torn wilderness of New Mexico and Texas. Many characters are caught up in a whirlwind of death, madness, and bitter remorse.

The title refers to the shortsightedness of the Berrybenders and their friends, and to the courage with which most of them face the consequences.

It includes depictions of real life people such as Kit Carson and Davy Crockett as well as events such as the Battle of the Alamo.
