= Sin Killer =

2002 historical novel by Larry McMurtry

- First edition cover
- Author: Larry McMurtry
- Genre: Historical fiction
- Publisher: Simon & Schuster
- Publication date: May 13, 2002
- ISBN: 0-7432-3302-6

Sin Killer is a 2002 historical novel by American writer Larry McMurtry. It is the first, both in chronological and publishing order, of The Berrybender Narratives. Set in 1832, the book follows the adventures of a clan of eccentric British aristocrats and their retainers as they begin a hunting expedition up the Missouri River.

The title refers to the nickname given to frontiersman Jim Snow, a Berrybender ally who violently hates sin of all kinds.
