= Larry McMurtry =

American novelist (1936–2021)

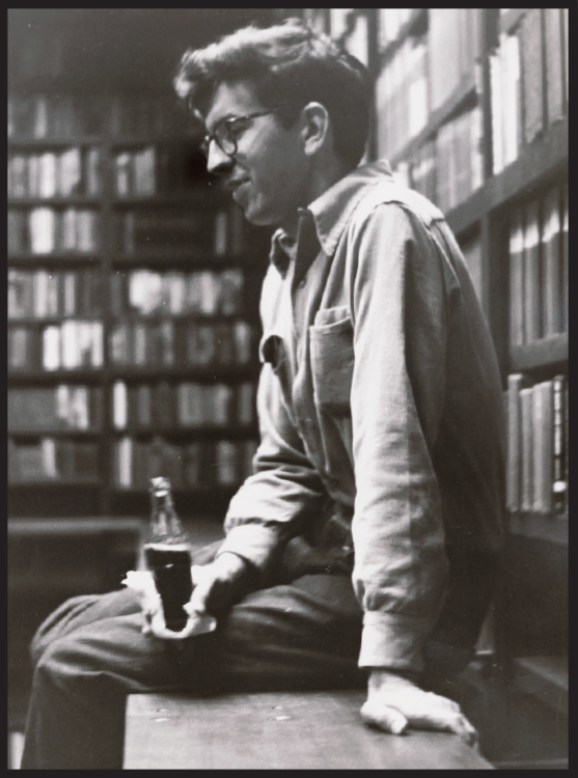
- Author photo by Douglas Peel on the book jacket of his novel The Last Picture Show, 1966
- Born: Larry Jeff McMurtry; June 3, 1936; Wichita Falls, Texas, U.S.
- Died: March 25, 2021 (aged 84); Tucson, Arizona, U.S.
- Education: University of North Texas (BA); Rice University (MA)
- Occupations: Novelist; screenwriter; essayist; antiquarian bookseller
- Spouses: Jo Ballard Scott (m. 1959; div. 1966); Norma Faye Kesey (m. 2011)
- Children: James McMurtry
- Writing career
- Years active: 1961–2021
- Notable works: Horseman, Pass By (1961); The Last Picture Show (1966); Terms of Endearment (1975); Lonesome Dove (1985)

Larry Jeff McMurtry (June 3, 1936 – March 25, 2021) was an American novelist, essayist, and screenwriter whose work was predominantly set in either the Old West or contemporary Texas. During a career spanning six decades, he wrote more than thirty novels, numerous essays and memoirs, and approximately fifty screenplays. Films adapted from McMurtry's works earned 34 Academy Award nominations with 13 wins, and his novels were the basis for several television miniseries.

McMurtry's early novels, including Horseman, Pass By (1961), The Last Picture Show (1966), and Terms of Endearment (1975), examined the decline of small-town and rural Texas life; all three were adapted into major films. His 1985 book Lonesome Dove, often considered his magnum opus, won the Pulitzer Prize. The novel, which follows several retired Texas Rangers on a cattle drive from Texas to Montana, was one of the most popular American novels of the late twentieth century, and it was adapted into a popular television miniseries. The subsequent three novels in his Lonesome Dove series were also adapted as miniseries. He later won the Academy Award for Best Adapted Screenplay for Brokeback Mountain (2005) alongside his longtime writing partner, Diana Ossana.

In addition to his literary career, McMurtry was one of the United States' most prominent antiquarian booksellers. He operated bookstores in Washington, D.C., and Archer City, Texas, where he amassed a stock of nearly half a million volumes. As president of PEN American from 1989 to 1991, he was an advocate for free speech. In 2014, he received the National Humanities Medal.

== Early life and education ==
McMurtry was born in Wichita Falls, Texas, in 1936, the eldest of four children of Hazel Ruth (née McIver) and William Jefferson (Jeff Mac) McMurtry. His grandfather, father, and uncles were ranchers, and he lived on his grandparents' ranch until he was six. In his memoir Books, McMurtry recalled that there were no books on the ranch, but his extended family would sit on the front porch every night and tell stories. In 1942, McMurtry's cousin Robert Hilburn stopped by the ranch house on his way to enlist for World War II, and left a box containing 19 boys' adventure books from the 1930s. The first book he read was Sergeant Silk: The Prairie Scout. His family then moved to the nearby town of Archer City, Texas, for more space. The small town later served as the model for the fictional town of Thalia, the setting for many of his novels.

McMurtry graduated from high school in 1954, one of 19 seniors. His father wanted him to pursue veterinary medicine at Texas A&M, but he did not have an interest in animals. For an undergraduate degree, he initially attended Rice University in Houston for three semesters but struggled with mathematics classes, including algebra and calculus. He transferred to the University of North Texas in Denton, where he took courses in creative writing and befriended his classmate Grover Lewis. McMurtry wrote several poems and short stories during his studies, and alongside Lewis, he created a campus magazine called the Coexistence Review, in which he published early excerpts of what would become his first novel, Horseman, Pass By. He also contributed to a literary magazine, The Avesta. He earned a BA from the University of North Texas in 1958 and an MA from Rice University in 1960.

== Career ==
=== Early work ===
In 1958, the Southwest Review accepted a poem from McMurtry, his first publication in a major journal. During the 1960–1961 academic year, McMurtry was a Wallace Stegner Fellow at the Stanford University Creative Writing Center, where he studied the craft of fiction under Frank O'Connor and Malcolm Cowley, alongside other aspiring writers, including Wendell Berry, Ken Kesey, Peter S. Beagle and Gurney Norman. (Note: Wallace Stegner was on sabbatical in Europe during McMurtry's fellowship year.) His debut novel, Horseman, Pass By, was published in 1961. The fictional setting of the novel, Thalia, resembled McMurtry's hometown of Archer City, Texas. The coming of age novel chronicles the demise of the Old West from the perspective of Lonnie Bannon. In a review for The New York Times, Wayne Gard wrote that "McMurtry has not only a sharp ear for dialogue but a gift of expression that easily could blossom in more important works." The novel was adapted into the film, starring Paul Newman. McMurtry left California and returned to Texas to take a year-long composition instructorship at Texas Christian University, where he continued to develop his next novels. McMurtry's next two novels Leaving Cheyenne (1963) and The Last Picture Show (1966), were also set in Thalia and adapted into films.

In 1963, he returned to Rice University, where he served as a lecturer in English until 1969, and a visiting professor at George Mason College (1970) and American University (1970–71). In 1964, McMurtry was awarded a Guggenheim Fellowship. He next produced a series of novels set in Houston with recurring characters. These included Moving On (1970), All My Friends Are Going to Be Strangers (1972), and Terms of Endearment (1975). In The New Yorker, Rachel Monroe described these books as "entertaining but uneven books that swing from slapstick to pathos". Terms of Endearment was adapted by James L. Brooks into a 1983 film that won five Academy Awards, including Best Picture. Thomas Powers, writing in The New York Review of Books, considered Moving On McMurtry's finest early work, calling it "a convincing portrait of the deepening silence between men and women left by the long collapse of Texas ranching culture". McMurtry was a regular contributor to The New York Review of Books.

=== Lonesome Dove ===
Lonesome Dove originated as a screenplay idea developed by McMurtry and director Peter Bogdanovich, with John Wayne, Jimmy Stewart, and Henry Fonda in mind for casting as aging cowboys. The movie was not developed but McMurtry repurposed the idea into a novel about two retired Texas Rangers, Augustus McCrae and Woodrow Call, who lead a cattle drive from the Rio Grande to Montana. The novel was a commercial and critical success, selling over 4 million copies and winning the Pulitzer Prize for Fiction. George Garrett, writing for the Chicago Tribune, described it as a masterpiece, praising its "authority of exact authenticity" and concluding that it restored the tradition of the Western "by reforming and revising it." McMurtry, however, had a complicated relationship with the novel's reception. He reflected on the book's legacy in Literary Life: A Second Memoir (2009), writing that it was the "Gone With the Wind of the West... a pretty good book; it's not a towering masterpiece." According to his biographer Tracy Daugherty, however, McMurtry privately held a more laudatory view of the book, describing it as the best work he would ever write.

In 1989, the novel was adapted into a popular television miniseries starring Tommy Lee Jones and Robert Duvall.

=== Later years ===
In 1991, McMurtry underwent heart surgery. During his recovery, he suffered severe depression. He recovered at the home of his future writing partner Diana Ossana and wrote his novel Streets of Laredo at her kitchen counter. After surgery, he also wrote Crazy Horse: A Life. A profile in The Wall Street Journal noted that he "recovered a sense of himself as a writer only after he began" working on the book, writing by hand. Ossana and McMurtry collaborated on the novels Pretty Boy Floyd (1994) and Zeke and Ned (1997), as well as numerous screenplays. His sole-authored books during this period include The Berrybender Narratives, four novels that follow an English hunting party in the American West. In a review of the first volume, Sin Killer (2002), Michiko Kakutani gave an unfavorable review, calling it a "perfunctory, highly formulaic love story" in which McMurtry is "skating along on automatic pilot". Other reviewers shared a similar sentiment regarding the quality of his later novels. Reflecting on McMurtry's prolific output, Dwight Garner stated: "He writes so much that supply outstrips demand. A lot of his stuff verges on being––how to put this?––typed rather than written.”

In 2006, he was co-winner (with Ossana) of both the Best Screenplay Golden Globe and the Academy Award for Best Adapted Screenplay for Brokeback Mountain, adapted from a short story by E. Annie Proulx. He accepted his Oscar while wearing a dinner jacket over jeans and cowboy boots. In his speech, he promoted books, reminding the audience the movie was developed from a short story. In his Golden Globe acceptance speech, he paid tribute to his Swiss-made Hermes 3000 typewriter.

=== Antiquarian bookstore businesses ===
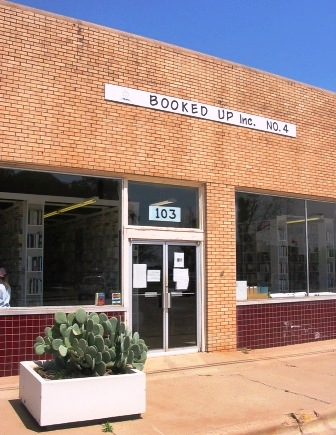
One of McMurtry's bookstores in Archer City, Texas

While at Stanford, McMurtry became a rare-book scout. During his years in Houston, he managed a bookstore called the Bookman. He moved to Washington, D.C. in 1969. Subsequently, in 1970, he started a bookshop in Georgetown with two partners, which he named Booked Up. In 1988, he opened another Booked Up store in Archer City. It became one of the largest antiquarian bookstores in the United States, carrying between 400,000 and 450,000 titles. Citing economic pressures from Internet bookselling, McMurtry came close to shutting down the Archer City store in 2005, but chose to keep it open after great public support.

In early 2012, McMurtry decided to downsize and sell off the greater portion of his inventory. He felt the collection was a liability for his heirs. The auction was conducted on August 10 and 11, 2012, and was overseen by Addison and Sarova Auctioneers of Macon, Georgia. This epic book auction sold books by the shelf, and was billed as "The Last Booksale", in keeping with the title of McMurtry's The Last Picture Show. Dealers, collectors, and gawkers came out en masse from all over the country to witness this historic auction. As stated by McMurtry on the weekend of the sale, "I've never seen that many people lined up in Archer City, and I'm sure I never will again." In April 2006, McMurtry was elected a member of the American Antiquarian Society.

=== Advocacy ===
McMurtry was a vigorous defender of free speech and, while serving as president of PEN American Center (now PEN America) from 1989 to 1991, led the organization's efforts to support Salman Rushdie, whose novel The Satanic Verses (1988) caused a major controversy among some Muslims, with the supreme leader of Iran, Ayatollah Ruhollah Khomeini, issuing a fatwa calling for Rushdie's assassination, after which attempts were made on Rushdie's life.

In 1989, McMurtry testified on behalf of PEN America before the U.S. Congress in opposition to immigration rules in the 1952 McCarran–Walter Act that for decades permitted the visa denial and deportation of foreign writers for ideological reasons. He recounted how before PEN America was to host the 1986 International PEN Congress, "there was a serious question as to whether such a meeting could in fact take place in this country... the McCarran–Walter Act could have effectively prevented such a gathering in the United States." He denounced the relevant rules as "an affront to all who cherish the constitutional guarantees of freedom of expression and association. To a writer whose living depends upon the uninhibited interchange of ideas and experiences, these provisions are especially appalling." Subsequently, some provisions that excluded certain classes of immigrants based on their political beliefs were revoked by the Immigration Act of 1990.

== Writing style ==
McMurtry was a prolific writer over many decades. He stated in Books: A Memoir that from his first novel on, he would get up early and dash off five pages of narrative. When he published the memoir in 2008, he said this was still his method, although by then, he wrote 10 pages a day. He wrote every day, ignoring holidays and weekends. He did not outline his books, instead writing where his characters took him. Tracy Daugherty's 2023 biography of McMurtry quotes critic Dave Hickey: "Larry is a writer, and it's kind of like being a critter. If you leave a cow alone, he'll eat grass. If you leave Larry alone, he'll write books. When he's in public, he may say hello and goodbye, but otherwise he is just resting, getting ready to go write." In an interview with NPR in 2009, he talked about getting old and creative efforts: "I don't have as much creative energy as I did, and I parcel it out... I write just exactly what interests me and not another word."

== Awards and legacy ==
Scott Kraft of the Los Angeles Times wrote that McMurtry became "the dominant voice in Western literature" following the publication of his first novel, Horseman, Pass By. In The New York Times, Andy Greenwald described McMurtry as "a peerless interlocutor of Texas, bridging the gap between its rural past and its noisy, urban present." Several authors released statements on his death. Stephen King wrote: "I learned from him, which was important, I was entertained by him, which was ALL important. RIP, cowboy." The Texas Legislature passed a resolution honoring his memory.

I suspect few Texans give a whit where McMurtry ranks as a writer, or whether his hits outnumber his misses. He's given us so much.

— Bryan Burrough, The Washington Post (2023)

McMurtry's impact was especially felt in his hometown of Archer City. After his death, his former bookshop Booked Up closed, but in 2024 the Archer City Writer's Workshop acquired the building and its estimated 300,000 volumes for the Larry McMurtry Literary Center that attracts travelers.

McMurtry won numerous awards from the Texas Institute of Letters, including three Jesse H. Jones awards: in 1962, for Horseman, Pass By; in 1967, for The Last Picture Show, which he shared with Tom Pendleton's The Iron Orchard; and in 1986, for Lonesome Dove. He won the Amon G. Carter award for periodical prose in 1966 for Texas: Good Times Gone or Here Again? and the Lon Tinkle Award for Lifetime Achievement in 1984. In 1986, McMurtry received the annual Peggy V. Helmerich Distinguished Author Award from the Tulsa Library Trust.

Three film adaptations of McMurtry's works have won Academy Awards: Hud (1963), based on Horseman, Pass By; The Last Picture Show (1971); and Terms of Endearment (1983). In 2006, McMurtry and Diana Ossana won Best Adapted Screenplay for their adaptation of Annie Proulx’s short story "Brokeback Mountain", which was made into the movie of the same name.

== Personal life ==
McMurtry met his first wife, Jo Ballard Scott, at a party during his senior year of college at North Texas State University, and they married in 1959. They had one son, James McMurtry. James and his son, Curtis McMurtry, are singer/songwriters and guitarists. McMurtry married Norma Faye Kesey, the widow of Ken Kesey, on April 29, 2011, in a civil ceremony in Archer City.

McMurtry was noted for his sensitive and in-depth portrayal of women in his writing, and he maintained several close friendships with women over his career, including Diane Keaton, Cybil Shepard, and Susan Sontag.

He died on March 25, 2021, at his home in Tucson, Arizona. He was 84 years old. It was announced in early 2023 that McMurtry's personal property, including his writing desk, typewriters and personal book collection would be sold at public auction by Vogt Auction in San Antonio, Texas, on May 29, 2023. A large amount of his personal collection of books went to INKQ Rare Books in Addison, Texas.

== Fiction ==
=== Stand-alone novels ===
- 1982: Cadillac Jack
- 1988: Anything for Billy (fictionalized biography of Billy the Kid)
- 1990: Buffalo Girls (fictionalized biography of Calamity Jane). adapted for TV as Buffalo Girls
- 1994: Pretty Boy Floyd (with Diana Ossana) (fictionalized biography of the titular gangster)
- 1997: Zeke and Ned (with Diana Ossana) (fictionalized biography of the last Cherokee warriors)
- 2001: Boone's Lick
- 2005: Loop Group
- 2006: Telegraph Days
- 2014: The Last Kind Words Saloon

=== Thalia: A Texas Trilogy ===
Larry McMurtry's first three novels, all set in the north Texas town of Thalia following World War II.

- 1961: Horseman, Pass By, adapted for film as Hud
- 1963: Leaving Cheyenne, adapted for film as Lovin' Molly
- 1966: The Last Picture Show, adapted as film of the same name

=== Harmony and Pepper series ===
The books follow the story of mother/daughter characters Harmony and Pepper.

- 1983: The Desert Rose
- 1995: The Late Child

=== Duane Moore series ===
The books follow the story of character Duane Moore.

- 1966: The Last Picture Show – adapted for film as The Last Picture Show
- 1987: Texasville – adapted for film as Texasville
- 1999: Duane's Depressed
- 2007: When the Light Goes
- 2009: Rhino Ranch: A Novel

=== Houston series ===
The books follow the stories of occasionally recurring characters living in the Houston, Texas, area.

- 1970: Moving On (characters Patsy Carpenter/Danny Deck/Emma Horton/Joe Percy)
- 1972: All My Friends Are Going to Be Strangers (Danny Deck/Jill Peel/Emma Horton)
- 1975: Terms of Endearment (Emma Horton/Aurora Greenway) – adapted for film as Terms of Endearment
- 1978: Somebody's Darling (Jill Peel/Joe Percy)
- 1989: Some Can Whistle (Danny Deck)
- 1992: The Evening Star (Aurora Greenaway) – adapted for film as The Evening Star

=== Lonesome Dove series ===
The Contrabando, a ghost town and movie set within Big Bend Ranch State Park, used for making the "Dead Man's Walk" and "Streets of Laredo" parts of the Lonesome Dove miniseries

- 1985: Lonesome Dove, 1986 Pulitzer Prize winner
- 1993: Streets of Laredo
- 1995: Dead Man's Walk
- 1997: Comanche Moon

=== The Berrybender Narratives ===
- 2002: Sin Killer
- 2003: The Wandering Hill
- 2003: By Sorrow's River
- 2004: Folly and Glory

=== As editor ===
- 1999: Still Wild: A Collection of Western Stories

=== Other writings ===
- 1988: The Murder of Mary Phagan – TV movie
- 1990: Montana – TV movie
- 1992: Memphis – TV movie
- 1992: Falling from Grace – film starring John Mellencamp
- 2002: Johnson County War – TV miniseries
- 2005: Brokeback Mountain (with Diana Ossana) – Oscar-winning screenplay (adapted from the short story by E. Annie Proulx)
- 2020: Joe Bell (with Diana Ossana)

== Nonfiction ==
- 1968: In a Narrow Grave: Essays on Texas
- 1974: "It's Always We Rambled" (essay)
- 1987: Film Flam: Essays on Hollywood
- 1999: Crazy Horse: A Life (biography)
- 1999: Walter Benjamin at the Dairy Queen: Reflections on Sixty and Beyond
- 2000: Roads: Driving America's Great Highways
- 2001: Sacagawea's Nickname – essays on the American West
- 2002: Paradise – South-Pacific travelogue/memoir
- 2005: The Colonel and Little Missie: Buffalo Bill, Annie Oakley & the Beginnings of Superstardom in America
- 2005: Oh What a Slaughter! : Massacres in the American West: 1846–1890
- 2008: Books: A Memoir
- 2009: Literary Life: A Second Memoir
- 2011: Hollywood: A Third Memoir
- 2012: Custer

== Film ==
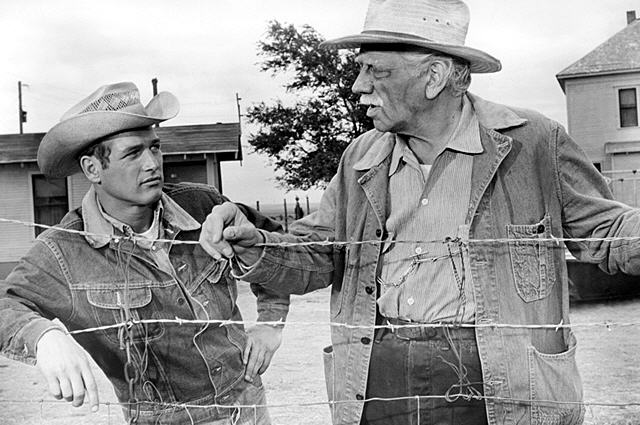
Paul Newman (left) and Melvyn Douglas in Hud (1963)

- 1963: Hud (based on his 1961 novel Horseman, Pass By)
- 1971: The Last Picture Show (co-wrote screenplay with Peter Bogdanovich, based on novel from 1966)
- 1972: The Streets of Laredo (unproduced; co-wrote story with Peter Bogdanovich, later adapted into novel Lonesome Dove)
- 1974: Lovin' Molly (based on the novel Leaving Cheyenne from 1963)
- 1983: Terms of Endearment (based on novel from 1975)
- 1984: The Lady in the Moon (unproduced; wrote screenplay and story)
- 1985: Honkytonk Sue (unproduced; based on the National Lampoon character)
- 1990: Texasville (based on novel from 1987)
- 1992: Falling from Grace (wrote screenplay and story)
- 1996: The Evening Star (based on novel from 1992)
- 2005: Brokeback Mountain (co-wrote screenplay with Diana Ossana and adapted from the short story by Annie Proulx)
- 2007: Boone's Lick (unproduced; co-wrote screenplay with Diana Ossana, based on novel from 2000)
- 2010: Empire of the Summer Moon (unproduced; co-wrote screenplay with Diana Ossana and adapted from the novel by S. C. Gwynne)
- 2012: Duane's Depressed (unproduced; based on novel from 1999)
- 2020: Joe Bell (co-wrote screenplay with Diana Ossana)

== Television ==
- 1977: The American Film Institute's 10th Anniversary Special (writer)
- 1988: The Murder of Mary Phagan (mini-series based on story)
- 1989: Lonesome Dove (mini-series based on 1985 novel)
- 1990: Montana (original screenplay)
- 1992: Memphis (teleplay)
- 1993: Return to Lonesome Dove (based on the fictional universe of the 1985 novel)
- 1994–1995: Lonesome Dove: The Series (based on the fictional universe of the 1985 novel)
- 1995: Buffalo Girls (based on 1990 novel)
- 1995: Streets of Laredo (wrote teleplay, based on 1993 novel)
- 1995–1996: Lonesome Dove: The Outlaw Years (based on the fictional world of the 1985 novel)
- 1996: Dead Man's Walk (wrote teleplay, based on 1995 novel)
- 2002: Johnson County War (wrote teleplay)
- 2008: Comanche Moon (wrote teleplay, based on 1997 novel)

== See also ==
- Frank Q. Dobbs
