= Roads: Driving America's Great Highways =

2000 book by Larry McMurtry

- First edition cover
- Author: Larry McMurtry
- Language: English
- Genre: Memoir; Travel literature
- Publisher: Simon & Schuster
- Publication date: 2000
- Publication place: US
- Pages: 206 (first edition)
- ISBN: 9780684868851
- OCLC: 46863485
- Preceded by: Walter Benjamin at the Dairy Queen: Reflections on Sixty and Beyond
- Followed by: Paradise

Roads: Driving America's Great Highways is a 2000 non-fiction book by Larry McMurtry about driving around the US. The book not only catalogs his observations along the journey but also includes a discussion of travel writing; McMurtry took an interest in the work of previous authors in the genre. He also intersperses the work with introspections about the routes his life has taken.

== Reception ==
The book was a part memoir. According to The New York Times "the book is not an aid to travel but an occasion for fleeting, from-the-hip commentary on anything along the way that comes to his eye or mind". Michiko Kakutani positively reviewed the book, enjoying McMurtry's observations on the road and his reminisces about his childhood.

The Austin Chronicle wrote "this is not really a book about taking trips along specific roads but another Proustian journey along the trails in Texas' most famous novelist's varied past as he traces the places that have been central to his life and work" and it "should be read as a companion piece to McMurtry's last memoir, Walter Benjamin at the Dairy Queen."
