= The Berrybender Narratives =

Series of novels written by Larry McMurtry

The Berrybender Narratives is a series of novels written by Larry McMurtry. It tells the story of an ill-fated hunting expedition lasting several years and covering much of the early American West. As with much of McMurtry's Western fiction, it weaves a tale of bloody adventure with a sort of ghastly dark humor.

The four novels in the series, with publication dates, are:

- Sin Killer (2002)
- The Wandering Hill (2003)
- By Sorrow's River (2003)
- Folly and Glory (2004)
