= Sacagawea's Nickname =

2001 essay collection by Larry McMurtry

- Author: Larry McMurtry
- Genre: Essay collection
- Publication date: 2001

Sacagawea's Nickname: Essays on the American West is a collection of essays by the American writer Larry McMurtry. It was published in 2001 by New York Review Books, and consists chiefly of articles, book reviews and also some interesting tidbits about the young woman that had appeared in the publishing house's affiliated magazine The New York Review of Books (NYRB) between 1997 and 2001. The book was generally well received by reviewers.

McMurtry dedicated the book to Barbara Epstein, editor of the NYRB.

== Contents ==
1. The West Without Chili
2. Inventing the West
3. Chopping Down the Sacred Tree
4. A Heroine of the Prairies
5. Zuni
6. Cookie Pioneers
7. Powell of the Colorado
8. Pulpmaster
9. Janet Lewis
10. The American Epic
11. Sacagawea's Nickname
12. Old Misery

== Reception ==
Kirkus Reviews wrote critically that the essays at times had an "ephemeral, dashed-off feel", but that fans of McMurty would enjoy them. Publishers Weekly gave a starred review, calling the essays "brilliant", and concluded "this collection is a fine performance from a man who, excepting perhaps Cormac McCarthy, is our most talented and important chronicler of the West."
