= Film Flam: Essays on Hollywood =

1987 essay collection by Larry McMurtry

- Author: Larry McMurtry
- Language: English
- Genre: Essays
- Publisher: Simon & Schuster
- Publication date: June 1, 1987
- Publication place: United States
- Media type: Print (hardcover and paperback)
- Pages: 228
- ISBN: 0743216245

Film Flam: Essays on Hollywood is a 1987 collection of essays by writer Larry McMurtry about the film industry, including his own experiences with the adaptations of his novels.

The book was based in part on a regular column McMurtry wrote for American Film, a magazine for the American Film Institute.

== Reception ==
Kirkus Reviews praised the book, writing: "McMurtry's modest essays on Hollywood screenwriting and films generally are among the most literate and absorbing in recent memory, especially when set beside William Goldman's Adventures in the Screen Trade."
