= By Sorrow's River =

2003 novel by Larry McMurtry

- First edition (publ. Simon & Schuster)
- Author: Larry McMurtry
- Audio read by: Alfred Molina
- Series: The Berrybender Narratives
- Publisher: Simon & Schuster
- Publication date: January 1, 2003
- ISBN: 978-0-743-23304-0

By Sorrow's River is a 2003 novel by American novelist Larry McMurtry. It is the third, both in chronological and publishing order, of The Berrybender Narratives. Set in the year 1833, it recounts the Berrybenders' journey south through the Great Plains to Bent's Fort on the Arkansas River.

The theme of random and senseless death, often present in McMurtry's western fiction, is particularly powerful in this book; several characters die due to their own poor judgement or that of others.

By Sorrow's River received reviews from Booklist, Kirkus Reviews, and Publishers Weekly.

Publishers Weekly also reviewed the audiobook narrated by Alfred Molina.
