= Cadillac Jack =

1982 novel by Larry McMurtry

- Author: Larry McMurtry
- Language: English
- Publication date: 1982
- Publication place: USA
- Pages: 395
- ISBN: 0671555413
- OCLC: 8474508
- Dewey Decimal: 813/.54
- LC Class: PS3563.A319 C3 1985

Cadillac Jack is an American novel by Larry McMurtry, first published by Simon and Schuster in 1982. The protagonist, Jack McGriff, is a thirty-three year old antique dealer who drives a white Cadillac across America in search of unique, high-value objects. The novel follows the peripatetic McGriff as he frequents auctions and flea markets, while navigating relationships with women.

== Conception ==
In one of his memoirs, McMurtry notes that he derived inspiration for the novel from his many years as a book scout. In Western American Literature, Janis Stout writes that "the freewheeling hero is very much a projection of McMurtry himself, who, in his capacity as rare book dealer, is known to wander the width of America in his own Cadillac".

== Plot ==
Jack McGriff is a thrice-divorced antique dealer and former professional bulldogger. At a junk barn in De Queen, Arkansas, he purchases a Sung vase for $20 and later sells it for over $100,000 at Sotheby's. He searches for similarly rare and valuable items across America. In Washington D.C., he begins an affair with Cindy Sanders, a socialite and owner of an antique store. McGriff and Sanders partner on developing an exhibit of rare boots. They drive to New Mexico to obtain the shoes last worn by Billy the Kid. After they secure the boots for the exhibit, Sanders leaves McGriff to meet another suitor in Florida. McGriff drives back alone, stopping at the house of an oilman on the way, where he secures more unique boots for the exhibit. Back in Washington, D.C., McGriff navigates another love interest, Jean Arber, who also owns an antique store. Arber has two young girls, and McGriff grows close to the family. Ultimately, his relationship with Arber ends amicably, and he resumes his itinerant search for antiques. From a hotel room, he watches the boot exhibit on television.

== Reception ==
Writing for The New York Times, Eden Lipson wrote "every time Mr. McMurtry threatens to get into something like substantive plot or character development, Jack jumps into that dadblamed car and drives off somewhere. The cruising is endless and serves only to connect the short, affectionate, sometimes hilarious vignettes of Americans trading and swapping that give the book its genuine eccentricity." Kirkus called it "an idle mix of charm, noise, and hoke... far too long... fitfully endearing, and especially disappointing after the textured comedy/drama control of Somebody Darling."

McMurtry called it one of his "weakest books" adding it "doesn’t have that many fans either, although John Mellencamp is one positive reader for whom I have great respect."

== Notes ==
- McMurtry, Larry (2008). Books: A Memoir. Simon & Schuster.
- McMurtry, Larry (2009). Literary Life: A Second Memoir. Simon & Schuster.
- McMurtry, Larry (2010). Hollywood. Simon & Schuster.
