= Books: A Memoir =

2008 memoir by Larry McMurtry

- Author: Larry McMurtry
- Language: English
- Genre: Memoir
- Publication date: 2008
- Publication place: United States
- Media type: Print (hardcover and paperback)
- Pages: 259
- ISBN: 978-1416583349
- Followed by: Literary Life: A Second Memoir

Books: A Memoir is a 2008 memoir by Larry McMurtry. It focuses on his love of books and his experiences as a book buyer and seller.

Kirkus Reviews called it "A pleasant amble in Bookland and a treat for the bookishly inclined, as well as for McMurtry buffs." Writing for The New York Times, James Campbell wrote that the book read like notes waiting to be assembled into a book.
