= The Last Picture Show (novel) =

1966 novel by Larry McMurtry

- Author: Larry McMurtry
- Language: English
- Series: Thalia: A Texas Trilogy/Duane Moore series
- Genre: Coming-of-age story
- Published: November 1966
- Publisher: The Dial Press
- Publication place: United States
- Media type: Print
- Pages: 215 (first edition)
- ISBN: 0891908897
- OCLC: 291926
- Preceded by: Leaving Cheyenne
- Followed by: Texasville

The Last Picture Show is a coming-of-age novel by Larry McMurtry published in 1966 by The Dial Press. Set in the small fictional town of Thalia, Texas in the early 1950s, the novel explores the lives of a group of teenagers as they navigate the complexities of adolescence, love, and the decline of their hometown.

It was McMurtry's third novel and forms part of the Thalia Trilogy and the Duane Moore Series, preceded by Leaving Cheyenne and followed by Texasville. He developed the novel from short stories written in college and drew on his experiences growing up in Archer City, Texas. The novel received mostly positive reviews. It was adapted into a film of the same name, with a screenplay written by McMurtry and director Peter Bogdanovich.

== Conception ==
The son of a rancher, McMurtry grew up in Archer City, a small town in North Texas, that would form the basis for the fictional town of Thalia in The Last Picture Show. He graduated from high school with 19 other students in 1954. While in college, he wrote two short stories Breeding Darrell and There Will Be Peace In Korea that seeded the draft of the novel.Breeding Darrell centers on the relationship between the owner of a pool hall and a simple boy under his charge, characters that inspired Sam the Lion and Billy. There Will Be Peace In Korea is about the night out for two boys on the eve of one of them shipping out to the Korean War. McMurtry's biographer, Tracy Daughtrey wrote: "All he would have to do is take one of the last lines in “There Will Be Peace in Korea”—'A lot of things happened when me and Bud and Laveta was in high school'—and spin it out."

McMurtry's experiences growing up also likely inspired several characters and scenes in the novel. A high school classmate of McMurtry's, Bobby Stubbs, sustained an injury to his eye during a fight with another boy over a girl. This scene is similar to the fight between the fictional Sonny and Duane over Jacy. McMurtry's friend, Ceil (née Slack) Cleveland, was the inspiration for Jacy. She published a memoir in 1977, with McMurtry's blessing, called Whatever Happened to Jacy Farrow?. McMurtry was 27 years old when the book was published, his third novel.

== Plot ==
Sonny Crawford and Duane Moore, both seniors, have finished playing their last game for the football team at Thalia High School, and they spend much of their time hanging out in the town’s pool hall and movie theater. The owner of those establishments, Sam the Lion, cares for a mentally disabled boy named Billy, who sweeps the businesses. Billy sometimes becomes lost after wandering outside with his broom and continuing to sweep up the street.

Both boys work to support themselves and do not study in school. They have rooms in a boarding house and share a pickup truck. They often go on double dates: Sonny with Charlene and Duane with Jacy Farrow. Sonny breaks up with Charlene, finding that he feels indifferent about her and envious of Duane's relationship with Jacy. Jacy uses her looks to court attention and adventure; she is the daughter of a wealthy oilman and her cynical mother, Lois, who drinks and is unfaithful to her husband.

In the spring semester, the boys play basketball under the direction of the lazy and disparaging Coach Popper. Popper excuses Sonny from school to take his wife, Ruth, to the doctor. Ruth feels unseen by her husband, including while dealing with breast cancer. She and Sonny begin an affair. Sonny visits her while the coach is at practice or fishing. Duane must compete for Jacy's attention as she associates with a group of richer boys from Wichita Falls, including Lester Marlow, who takes her to a skinny dipping party at the home of the attractive Bobby Sheen. After a fight between Duane and Lester leads to getting beaten by other boys, Sonny and Duane decide to go to Matamoros, Mexico, where they watch pornographic movies and visit whores. Returning home after several days, they are informed Sam the Lion had a stroke and died while they were away.

The senior class goes on a graduation trip to San Francisco. Jacy sleeps with Duane on the trip, but she breaks up with him when they return to Thalia. Duane leaves town to find work as a roughneck. After Bobby Sheen jilts her, Jacy begins going out with Sonny, who abruptly stops seeing Ruth, devastating her. Duane confronts Sonny over Jacy and they fight; Sonny is hit by a bottle and blinded in one eye. Jacy, pleased by the drama, elopes with Sonny to Oklahoma, but, as Jacy expects, her father has them tracked down by police before the marriage is consummated. Lois, angry both with her husband's overprotectiveness and her daughter's treatment of Sonny, contrives a onetime tryst with Sonny in a motel. Soon, Jacy leaves town for college.

Sonny, who has now graduated high school, struggles with feeling like an outsider, especially at a football game that Thalia wins. He lives with Billy above the pool hall that Sam the Lion left them in his will. Duane joins the army and he and Sonny go out for a last night of drinking before he ships out to fight in the Korean War. The movie theater goes out of business, and one morning Billy is hit by a truck and killed while sweeping the street. Grieving and shaken by "the feeling that he was the only person in town", Sonny goes to see Ruth. She rebukes him, cries, but then allows him to take her hand and begins to comfort him.

== Reception ==
The Last Picture Show received critical acclaim upon its publication. Writing for The New York Times, Thomas Lask praised the rendition of small town life, writing that McMurtry "knows his town and its folkways". Lask, however, wrote that "some of the writing could be smoother", including the transitions between scenes.

Despite it being one of his most popular and acclaimed works, McMurtry said in his 2010 memoir Hollywood that he "had never particularly liked Picture Show".

== Film adaptation ==
The novel was adapted into a 1971 film of the same name directed by Peter Bogdanovich. McMurtry cowrote the screenplay.
