= Texasville =

1990 American drama film by Peter Bogdanovich

- Theatrical release poster
- Directed by: Peter Bogdanovich
- Screenplay by: Peter Bogdanovich
- Based on: Texasville by Larry McMurtry
- Produced by: Peter Bogdanovich; Barry Spikings
- Starring: Jeff Bridges; Cybill Shepherd; Annie Potts; Cloris Leachman; Randy Quaid; Timothy Bottoms; Eileen Brennan; William McNamara
- Cinematography: Nicholas Josef von Sternberg
- Edited by: Richard Fields
- Production companies: Nelson Entertainment; Cine-Source
- Distributed by: Columbia Pictures
- Release date: September 28, 1990
- Running time: 126 minutes
- Country: United States
- Language: English
- Budget: $18 million
- Box office: $2.3 million

Texasville is a 1990 American drama film written and directed by Peter Bogdanovich. Based on the 1987 novel Texasville by Larry McMurtry, it is a sequel to The Last Picture Show (1971), and features Jeff Bridges, Cybill Shepherd, Cloris Leachman, Timothy Bottoms, Randy Quaid, and Eileen Brennan reprising their roles from the original film.

Texasville was filmed in color, while The Last Picture Show was filmed in black and white. Unlike its predecessor, the film received generally mixed reviews from critics and was a box-office bomb, grossing $2.3 million against its $18 million budget.

== Plot ==
In 1984, 33 years after the events depicted in The Last Picture Show, 50-year-old Duane Jackson is a wealthy tycoon of a near-bankrupt oil company. His relationship with his family is not prospering. His wife, Karla, believes that Duane is cheating on her, and his son, Dickie, seems to be following in his father's libidinous footsteps.

Ruth Popper works as Duane's secretary, and despondent Lester Marlow, now a bank president, seems a prime candidate for a business crisis, a heart attack, or both.

Sonny Crawford's increasingly erratic behaviour causes Duane concern over his mental health.

Jacy Farrow has travelled the world and experienced its pleasures. A painful tragedy brings her back to her hometown and once again into Duane's life.

== Cast ==
- Jeff Bridges as Duane Jackson
- Timothy Bottoms as Sonny Crawford
- Cybill Shepherd as Jacy Farrow
- Cloris Leachman as Ruth Popper
- Randy Quaid as Lester Marlow
- Annie Potts as Karla Jackson
- William McNamara as Dickie Jackson
- Eileen Brennan as Genevieve Morgan
- Angie Bolling as Marylou Marlow
- Su Hyatt as Suzie Nolan
- Earl Poole Ball as Junior Nolan
- Katherine Bongfeldt as Nellie, Duane's daughter
- Allison Marich as Billie Anne
- Kay Pering as Lavelle Bates
- Jimmy Howell and Romi Snyder as Jack and Julie, the twins
- Pearl Jones as Minerva, the housekeeper
- Loyd Catlett as Lee Roy
- Harvey Christiansen as Old Man Balt

== Production ==
=== Development ===
The novel was published in 1987. Cybill Shepherd was attached to the project as early as late 1986. She was then starring in the popular TV series Moonlighting. Peter Bogdanovich expressed interest in directing in January 1987.

"I guess what decided it for me is that it's rare in one's career to be given the opportunity to go back in time and recapture something that's important in your career, and in your life," he said. "And to approach it from another angle, to find a new way of looking at the same thing."

"It seemed to me impossible to turn my back on something that was in a way personal to me," he said, "because certainly Larry had to have been influenced in the writing of Texasville by the movie. I mean, the book is dedicated to Cybill Shepherd. It just seemed that it would be ungrateful, or in some way churlish, not to attempt to deal with these people and these themes."

In April 1987, Dino De Laurentiis who was making a film with Bogdanovich, Illegally Yours, paid a reported $750,000 for the film rights. The movie would be made with Bogdanovich, Shepherd and Jeff Bridges.

In July 1987, Bogdanovich said they were discussing the film with several studios and planned to make the movie during a Moonlighting hiatus. However, by September, de Laurentiis was in financial trouble. The director said he and Shepherd "both want to make the movie, but everything is now up in the air... We have no idea when we'll make the movie - or where. Everything could get straightened out, but right now it's in limbo." In November 1987, it was reported that De Laurentiis did not want to make the movie with Bogdanovich but Shepherd insisted he be director, so the producer sold the rights to Bogdanovich.

In October 1988, Bogdanovich was discussing the project with the original stars of Picture Show and said he was hopeful for the sequel to go ahead.

Bogdanovich said he asked McMurtry to help him with the script "but he was too busy writing novels. "And anyway, Larry tends to get bored with his books once he's written them; he really doesn't like to go back and work on a book." So the director did the adaptation. "The big problem was to figure out how to cut it down and what to emphasize," he said. "You could strip it of the comedy and have the very serious picture. The problem with the first draft was that it was a little bit too serious."(McMurtry claimed Bogdanovich's assistant Iris Chester wrote most of the script. The author said he and Bogdanovich had "various loud fallings-out" during the making of the movie and they did not talk again until the premiere of The Evening Star.

Bogdanovich said that a few companies, including Carolco Pictures, had expressed interest in the movie but "There certainly was some reluctance in this town about this project. I don't know that it was specifically me, but it was a difficult project."

"The studios thought there wasn't enough of a narrative thread to the book," he added. "I thought there was a plot, and it was what happened to Jeff Bridges' character! Duane and everyone around him as he prepares for the town's centennial."

Finance eventually came from Nelson Entertainment and Cine Source. It would be Cine Source's first production. The company arranged finance from various investors for $24 million, which covered production, promotion and advertising costs; in exchange, Cine Source took 25.5% of the gross after distribution fees and certain other costs are deducted. "How it will do critically and how it will do at the box office, no one can guess," said Cine-Source President Robert Whitmore. "But it's a great motion picture and we have every reason to believe it's going to be an enormous success."

Filming was meant to begin in February 1989 but was pushed back.

It was decided to make the movie in Archer City again. "The bad taste that the movie left for some folks, that's gone now," said the high-school principal, Nat Lunn. "Especially with money being short in town, they're ready for another dose of Hollywood."

"Texasville is about certain aspects of my life," said Bogdanovich. "But those characters are really Larry's characters. And I feel empathy and sympathy and interest in them as human beings."

He added the film was "more chaotic, less structured, more fragmented, more insane, more desperate [than Picture Show]. There's something intrinsically tragic about coming-of-age. But there's something inherently funny about a mid-life crisis. It can be sad, but not tragic. I think Texasville will be lighter on the surface, but down below even sadder."

The original movie cost $1.3 million. For the sequel, Shepherd's fee was $1.5 million and Bridges was paid $1.75 million. Timothy Bottoms only agreed to make the film once Nelson Entertainment financed a $100,000 documentary of his about the making of the film. "I didn't want to do this movie, because I don't like any of the people in it," said Bottoms. "I didn't like The Last Picture Show. I didn't like the script. I didn't like the people I was working with. I didn't like the way they treated each other - without compassion or care. I felt like I saw Hollywood at its worst."

=== Shooting ===
Filming began August 1989.

Bridges put on 35 pounds to play his role. "I usually approach a role by figuring out what the guy I'm playing looks like physically," he said. "Then I try to mold my body along those lines. Duane, after all, was 10 years older than I am. I needed weight for the age factor and for the shape he would be in after the kind of food he must have been eating. I put on 35 pounds, getting my weight up to about 210. The weight was uncomfortable. I didn't feel well, which is enough reason to keep my weight down. But it was worth it because it helped me believe in Duane."

Annie Potts was filming episodes of Designing Women during the shoot and had to commute from Los Angeles to the location every week.

While making the movie, a documentary was being made about The Last Picture Show called Picture This directed by George Hickenlooper.

"The most difficult thing about filming Texasville was confronting everything that has happened in my own life," Bogdanovich said. "I expected my own ghost to walk around the corner and say, 'Hey, things have changed since you were 31, haven't they, bub?'" "Everything was totally different," Bogdanovich said. "And yet the essential things remained. We all liked and respected one another."

== Release and reception ==
=== Box office ===
Texasville performed poorly at the box office. It opened at number eleven making $900,000., generating only $2.2 million its first 38 days; the budget was reportedly $20 million.

One exhibitor said he felt the film "was destined to die. It was a picture, from the word go, that all the reports we heard were negative. It didn't screen well, there were problems with the story, problems with Bogdanovich. Originally there were reports they couldn't sign Timothy Bottoms. I just don't think that there was anything more that they could have done. It just was not a good motion picture."

The film's poor box office performance could have also been compounded by the fact that The Last Picture Show was one of the few major films of the last two decades not available on VHS; it was only released after Texasville. "It took a great deal of trouble to get the video rights for the 28 songs that are in The Last Picture Show," Bogdanovich said. "During the time that Columbia was owned by Coca-Cola, they didn't want to reissue it because it contains so many references to Dr Pepper. But the current Columbia hierarchy is very supportive of the video release."

=== Critical ===
On Rotten Tomatoes, the film has a score of 60% from 25 reviews with the critic consensus: "An impressive array of talent on either side of the camera helps compensate for Texasville's inability to live up to its classic predecessor, but it isn't quite enough." Audiences surveyed by CinemaScore gave the film a grade of "C+" on scale of A+ to F.

Filmink magazine called it a "bad film", although they blamed Larry McMurtry's source material. "Aimless. Cartoony. No soul. Excellent acting from Cybill Shepherd (whose part should have been bigger), Tim Bottoms, Jeff Bridges and Annie Potts. But no nuance." The magazine felt Picture This, the documentary about the making of the movie, was "everything Texasville is not—brilliantly evocative of a place (love those whining cowboys who want to be in the movie), memorable characters (Larry McMurtry’s worried mother, the original inspiration for Jacy, cuckolded Polly Platt, tormented Bogdanovich, awkward Tim Bottoms), and true drama (returning to the scene of a film where so much happened)."

Jonathan Rosenbaum of the Chicago Reader included Texasville on his list of the best films of 1990 and favorably compared it to the films of John Cassavetes.

== Recut ==
In 1992, Bogdanovich recut the film for The Movie Channel so it ran 28 minutes longer. "This is the way Texasville should have been seen when it was originally released," he said. "We had to take out a lot of the dramatic scenes between Jeff (Bridges) and Cybill and between Jeff and Timothy Bottoms. There was also a wonderful scene at the Centennial when Cybill sings a hymn. The balance between comedy and drama was off, so when the movie turned out to be a drama, people were thrown. Whereas the correct version, the longer version, has a better balance." Bogdanovich said the film was originally cut "under a lot of pressure. It didn't turn out like we wanted—at all. It was rather sad. So now we're glad to have this second chance."

In 2023, both the original theatrical version and a black-and-white version of the director's cut, produced in collaboration with cinematographer Nicholas von Sternberg, were included in a two-disc set of The Last Picture Show from The Criterion Collection.
