= Horseman, Pass By =

1961 novel by Larry McMurtry

- First edition
- Author: Larry McMurtry
- Language: English
- Genre: Western
- Publisher: Harper
- Publication date: 1961
- Publication place: United States
- Media type: Print (hardback and paperback)
- Pages: 179
- ISBN: 068485385X
- OCLC: 12533396
- Dewey Decimal: 813/.54
- LC Class: PS3563.A319 H6 1985

Horseman, Pass By is a 1961 Western novel by American writer Larry McMurtry. McMurtry's debut novel, it portrays life on a cattle ranch from the perspective of young narrator Lonnie Bannon. Set in Texas in 1954, the Bannon ranch is owned by Lonnie's grandfather, Homer Bannon. Homer's ruthless stepson, Hud, stands as the primary antagonist of the novel.

The novel was adapted into the 1963 film Hud, starring Paul Newman as the title character.

== Conception ==
McMurtry began developing the novel while enrolled at the University of North Texas. He published early excerpts of the book in a magazine that he developed with friends, called The Coexistence Review. After graduating in 1958, he recounted in his memoir Books that he rose early each morning to complete five pages of the novel. He also reported feeling ambivalent about the book's publication by Harper & Brothers in 1961, writing: "The publication so long awaited for, was anti-climatic".

The title of the novel derives from the last three lines of the poem "Under Ben Bulben" by William Butler Yeats, which are carved on Yeats’ tombstone:

Cast a cold eye

On life, on death.

Horseman, pass by.

== Plot ==
Set on a cattle ranch in rural Texas in the early 1950s, the 85-year-old Homer Bannon lives with his wife, his stepson Hud, his 17-year-old grandson Lonnie, and Halmea, a maternal African-American housekeeper. Lonnie, orphaned by the premature deaths of his parents, is the book's narrator and the prologue explains his day-to-day life as he transitions through adolescence. Hud is a capable ranch hand but has a ruthless character, and he indulges his often extreme appetites with no restraint, doing what he pleases regardless of the consequences. The tension between Hud and Homer and Lonnie's struggle to reach maturity are the key elements that drive the novel.

Lonnie spends most of his time working on the ranch while sometimes driving to town to shoot pool or drink beer with his friends. In the evenings at home, he frequently spends time with Halmea or talks to a pair of ranch hands who share their stories of cowboying and rodeoing all over the southwestern US. From them, Lonnie begins to consider a world beyond the remote Bannon ranch.

One day, one of Homer's young heifers is found dead. The state veterinarian is called in to determine the cause of death and is concerned that hoof and mouth disease may have killed the cow. While waiting for the vet to complete his analysis, Hud objects to Homer's handling of the situation and threatens to make a legal claim on the ranch based on Homer's advanced age and incompetence. Lonnie is shocked to hear Hud make such a threat and is surprised when Homer quickly dismisses it as mere talk.

After the vet determines that hoof and mouth disease killed the cow, the state orders the rest of Homer’s cattle to be put down to prevent an epidemic. Homer is unable to find a legal way to resist the state’s authority and the remaining cattle are shot and buried. After losing his cattle, Homer becomes aimless and increasingly depressed.

During this time, Hud gets drunk and assaults Halmea. Lonnie attempts to prevent the assault but fails and can only watch as Hud rapes Halmea. Halmea quits the next day without telling Homer what happened. Lonnie, who was drawn close to Halmea, drives her to her mother’s house to see her off.

Driving back from town very early one morning, Lonnie sees Homer crawling along the road in his nightclothes as he approaches the ranch. He panics and while trying to stop, steers his pickup into the ditch to avoid hitting him. Hud, following close behind Lonnie in his own car, rear-ends the pickup. Both Lonnie and Hud exit their cars and find Homer seriously injured and delirious with pain. Assessing the situation, they conclude that Homer probably fell somewhere on the ranch in the early morning darkness and desperately needs a doctor. With both cars inoperable, Hud tells Lonnie to run to the main road and get help. Lonnie is reluctant to leave his injured grandfather but soon agrees. After failing to find help, Lonnie hears a gunshot. Returning to the scene, he finds that Hud has shot and killed Homer. Hud explains that it was the only thing to do given Homer’s extreme pain and the unlikely chance of survival.

Lonnie takes little comfort from Homer’s funeral, finding it hypocritical and an unfitting end to his grandfather’s life. As they prepare Homer’s casket to depart for the cemetery, Lonnie breaks off from the mourners and remains alone at the church while the service moves to the cemetery.

The book ends soon after the funeral with Hud facing an inquiry into Homer’s death and Lonnie leaving town to visit a friend. Hud doesn't object to Lonnie leaving but tells him to stay in touch so that he can assist with the inquiry.

== Reception ==
In a review for The New York Times, Wayne Gard positively reviewed the debut novel, writing: "McMurtry has not only a sharp ear for dialogue but a gift of expression that easily could blossom in more important works." Academics have noted the originality of the novel within the Western genre. William Bloodworth described the novel as a realistic portrait of the cowboy, in comparison to the more typical quixotic version. He wrote: "The landscape of the Old West exists primarily in the dreams and fantasies of the main characters".

== Film adaptation ==
Horseman, Pass By was adapted into the Academy Award-winning film Hud, released by Paramount Pictures in May 1963. It was directed by Martin Ritt from a screenplay by Irving Ravetch and Harriet Frank Jr., with a cast featuring Paul Newman (Hud), Melvyn Douglas (Homer), and Brandon deWilde (Lonnie). The film adaptation makes several significant changes to the source material, notably shifting focus onto Hud as the antihero protagonist, and changing the Black housekeeper Halmea to a white woman named Alma (played by Patricia Neal).

The film won three Oscars (Best Actress for Neal, Best Supporting Actor for Douglas, and Best Cinematography (Black-and-White)) out of seven total nominations. In 2018, the film was selected for preservation in the National Film Registry by the Library of Congress.
