= The Evening Star (novel) =

1992 novel by Larry McMurtry

- Author: Larry McMurtry
- Language: English
- Set in: Texas
- Publication date: 1992
- Publication place: USA
- Preceded by: Terms of Endearment

The Evening Star is a 1992 American novel by Larry McMurtry. It follows on from Terms of Endearment.

The novel was filmed in 1996.

McMurtry called the book "my none too good sequel to Terms of Endearment" and had a heart attack while writing it. However, he was able to finish the novel before having heart surgery.

The novel continues the story of Aurora Greenway, focusing on her life after the events of Terms of Endearment, as she navigates aging, loss, and complicated relationships with her grandchildren.

== Notes ==
- McMurtry, Larry (2009). Literary Life: A Second Memoir. Simon & Schuster.
- McMurtry, Larry (2010). Hollywood: A Third Memoir. Simon & Schuster.
