= Terms of Endearment (novel) =

1975 novel by Larry McMurtry

- First edition cover
- Author: Larry McMurtry
- Language: English
- Series: Houston
- Set in: Houston
- Publication date: 1975
- Publication place: USA
- Pages: 410
- ISBN: 0671682083
- Dewey Decimal: 813/.54
- LC Class: 88036755
- Preceded by: All My Friends Are Going to Be Strangers
- Followed by: The Evening Star

Terms of Endearment is a 1975 American novel written by Larry McMurtry. It was his sixth novel and was adapted into a popular 1983 film.

== Premise ==
The novel follows the often fraught relationship between a mother and daughter, as they manage marriages, illness, and other life events. While McMurtry's first three novels had been about young people leaving the country, his next three, including Terms of Endearment, were about "urbanites" (the fourth and fifth novels being Moving On and All My Friends Are Going to Be Strangers).

== Conception ==
McMurtry wrote the novel in Italy while supervising his son James, who was appearing in the film Daisy Miller. He later called the novel "for long my favorite among my many fictions. I have come to like a later book, Duane's Depressed, just as much and maybe more, but Terms of Endearment still seems like my most mature fiction. It’s the story of a mother and a daughter, a subject that has always fascinated me. And Terms is the ripest fruit of this fascination". He wrote that Emma Horton was his favorite character. She appeared in All My Friends Are Going to Be Strangers but when he sold the rights he kept the rights to the character of Emma; McMurtry felt this decision enabled the film of Terms to be made.

McMurtry wrote "Although I think the last sixty pages of Terms of Endearment are among the very best pages I have written, it was while I was writing them that I began to sour on my own work. The minute I finished that book I fell into a literary gloom that lasted from 1975 until 1983, when the miracle of The Desert Rose snapped me out of it."

== Notes ==
- McMurtry, Larry (2009). Literary Life: A Second Memoir. Simon & Schuster.
- McMurtry, Larry (2010). Hollywood. Simon & Schuster.

== See also ==
- Terms of Endearment (play), a stage play based on the novel
