= Lonesome Dove =

1985 novel by Larry McMurtry

- First edition cover
- Author: Larry McMurtry
- Language: English
- Series: Lonesome Dove series
- Genre: Western
- Published: 1985
- Publisher: Simon & Schuster
- Publication place: United States
- Media type: Print (hardback & paperback)
- Pages: 843
- ISBN: 0-671-50420-7
- OCLC: 11812426
- Dewey Decimal: 813/.54 19
- LC Class: PS3563.O8749
- Followed by: Streets of Laredo

Lonesome Dove is a 1985 epic Western novel by American writer Larry McMurtry. It is the first published book of the Lonesome Dove series and the third installment in the series chronologically. It was a bestseller and won the 1986 Pulitzer Prize for Fiction. In 1989, it was adapted as a TV miniseries starring Tommy Lee Jones and Robert Duvall, which won both critical and popular acclaim. McMurtry went on to write a sequel, Streets of Laredo (1993), and two prequels, Dead Man's Walk (1995) and Comanche Moon (1997), all of which were also adapted as TV series.

== Premise ==
The novel, set in the waning days of the Old West, centers on the relationships between several retired Texas Rangers and their adventures driving a cattle herd from Texas to Montana. The novel contains themes including old age, death, loneliness, unrequited love, and friendship.

== Conception ==
The novel initially arose as a screenplay that McMurtry started writing with director Peter Bogdanovich. Originally titled Streets of Laredo, they wrote it with three movie stars in mind: John Wayne, James Stewart, and Henry Fonda. Warner Bros. liked the script, but the actors were noncommittal, especially Wayne, who was wary of the melancholy nature of the film. McMurtry later bought back the script from the studio for $35,000 for development into a novel, while continuing to write other novels, including the Desert Rose and Cadillac Jack. He received inspiration for the title of the book after seeing the name Lonesome Dove Baptist Church on a bus near Fort Worth. Simon & Schuster bought the novel for $250,000, with Irving Lazar acting as his agent.

== Plot ==
In the late 1870s, Captain Woodrow F. Call and Captain Augustus "Gus" McCrae, two famous retired Texas Rangers, run the Hat Creek Cattle Company and Livery Emporium in the small Texas border town of Lonesome Dove. Working with them are Joshua Deets, an excellent tracker and scout from their Ranger days; Pea Eye Parker, another former Ranger who, while illiterate, is both loyal and reliable. Other characters include Bolivar, a retired Mexican bandit who works as their cook; and Newt Dobbs, a seventeen-year-old boy whose mother was a prostitute named Maggie and whose father is widely thought by the outfit to be Call, though Call has never acknowledged this.

Jake Spoon, another former Ranger, arrives in Lonesome Dove after an absence of more than ten years, during which he has traveled widely across the United States. He reveals that he is on the run, having accidentally shot a dentist in Fort Smith, Arkansas. The dentist's brother happened to be the town's sheriff, July Johnson.

Reunited with Gus and Call, Jake's description of the Montana Territory inspires Call to steal a herd of cattle and drive them north, to begin the first cattle ranch north of the Yellowstone River. Call, who has grown restless in retirement, is attracted to the romantic notion of being the first to settle in a pristine country. Gus is less enthusiastic, but changes his mind when reminded that the love of his life, Clara, lives on the Platte River near Ogallala, Nebraska, which would be on the route to Montana. The Hat Creek outfit rustles thousands of cattle from across the border in Mexico and recruits local cowboys in preparation for the drive.

Ironically, Jake Spoon soon decides not to go at all, having made himself comfortable with the town's only prostitute, Lorena Wood, who is smitten with him after he promises to take her to San Francisco. At Lorena's insistence, however, Jake and she ultimately trail along behind the cattle drive.

In Fort Smith, the young and inexperienced sheriff, 24-year-old July Johnson, reluctantly departs town on the trail of Jake Spoon, taking his twelve-year-old stepson Joe with him, and leaving the inept deputy sheriff Roscoe Brown in charge. July's wife Elmira, who regrets her recent marriage to him, leaves shortly afterwards to search for her former lover Dee Boot. Roscoe is sent after July to inform him of her disappearance, and has many misadventures and strange encounters through Arkansas and Texas, assisted by a young girl named Janey, who escapes from sexual slavery to accompany him. Roscoe eventually reunites with July and Joe when they rescue Janey and him from bandits in Texas.

As the cattle drive moves north through Texas, the Hat Creek company encounters dust storms, dangerous river crossings, and many other adventures. Jake tires of Lorena and abandons her to go gambling in Austin. Left alone, she is abducted by an Indian bandit named Blue Duck, a notorious and mercilessly vicious old nemesis of the Texas Rangers. Gus goes in pursuit, and while traveling along the Canadian River, he encounters July's group. Gus and July attack Blue Duck's bandit encampment, killing the bandits and rescuing Lorena; however, Blue Duck has already made his escape, having murdered Roscoe, Joe, and Janey in the process. A devastated July continues his journey in search of Elmira, while Gus and Lorena return to the cattle drive. Lorena has been repeatedly raped, and suffering from post-traumatic stress disorder, is frightened of interacting with anybody other than Gus. The two still follow the cattle drive north, and sleep in a tent some distance behind the other cowboys.

Meanwhile, Jake Spoon is in Fort Worth. Hearing that July Johnson has been looking for him, Jake leaves Texas in a hurry in the company of the Suggs brothers, who are, he soon realizes, cruel bandits. Jake becomes increasingly alarmed by the brothers' actions as they travel north into Kansas; the gang progresses from robbery to cold-blooded murder, but Jake is too frightened and outnumbered to either kill them or escape. When the gang attacks a trail boss known to Gus and Call, the former Rangers of the Hat Creek outfit go in pursuit of them. The ex-Rangers are dismayed when they apprehend the Suggs brothers and find Jake alongside them. Jake pleads with his former comrades that he had no choice but to go along with things for fear of his own life, but Gus and Call stand firm that he has "crossed a line", and they solemnly hang him alongside the Suggs brothers. Newt, who had idolized Jake as a child, is left deeply upset.

Meanwhile, Elmira, pregnant with July's child, has come into the company of a rough buffalo hunter named Zwey, a simple man who seems to believe he is now "married" to her. Arriving in Nebraska, they come across the horse ranch of Clara Allen, Gus's former lover, whose husband, Bob, has become a brain-damaged invalid after being kicked in the head by a mustang. Clara delivers Elmira's baby son, but Elmira and Zwey leave almost immediately afterwards for Ogallala.

Dee Boot is held in the Ogallala jail, scheduled to be hanged for his accidental murder of a young boy; Elmira collapses while speaking to him, and Boot is hanged while she recuperates in a doctor's house, leaving her heartbroken and depressed. July arrives at Clara's ranch, learns what has transpired, and goes to see Elmira, but she refuses to speak to him. Shortly afterwards, she orders Zwey to take her east, back towards St. Louis. Anguished and heartbroken, July feels compelled to follow her, but at Clara's insistence, he remains at the ranch with her family and his son, instead, whom Clara has named Martin. Word later reaches them that Elmira and Zwey were killed by Sioux.

The Hat Creek outfit arrives in Nebraska, and Gus takes Lorena, Call, and Newt to visit Clara. Lorena, who has fallen in love with Gus, fears that Gus will abandon her for Clara. Clara is happy to see Gus, but has no desire to rekindle their romance, but she takes in Lorena, whose post-traumatic stress is easing and who quickly feels comfortable with Clara and her daughters. Gus, rebuffed by Clara and no longer Lorena's sole caretaker, decides to continue on the cattle drive and see the journey to Montana through to its end.

In Wyoming, several horses are stolen by half-starved Indians. Call, Gus, and Deets chase after them, and Deets is killed in the ensuing confrontation by the group's only remaining brave. Shortly afterward, Gus informs Newt that Call is his father, something about which Newt has always dreamed, but he is too upset by Deets' death to give it much thought.

After a desperate crossing through the arid basins of Wyoming, the cattle drive arrives in Montana, which proves to be as lush and beautiful as Jake had described. Scouting ahead of the main herd, Gus and Pea Eye are attacked by Blood Indians, and Gus is badly wounded by two arrows to the leg. Besieged in a makeshift dugout in the bank of the Musselshell River for several days, Gus' wounds become infected, and his health declines. After a heavy rain, he sends Pea Eye down the swollen river to seek help, but Pea Eye loses his clothing, boots, gun, and food in the river, and stumbles naked and unarmed for a 100-mile walk across the plains. Starving, delirious, and suffering from exposure, he is discovered by the rest of the cowboys on the verge of death. Call then sets out alone to rescue Gus.

Meanwhile, feverish and dying, Gus leaves the river shortly after Pea Eye, taking his chances and escaping the Indians. He makes it to Miles City, Montana, and collapses unconscious, waking to find that a doctor has sawed off his gangrenous leg. His other leg is also infected, but Gus refuses to let the doctor amputate it. Call arrives in Miles City and fruitlessly tries to convince Gus to have his other leg removed to save his life. Gus, however, would rather die than be an invalid. Gus asks Call to bury him in an orchard in Texas where he used to picnic with Clara, and Call begrudgingly agrees. After writing letters to Clara and Lorena, and urging Call to accept Newt as his son, Gus dies of blood poisoning. Call leaves Gus' body in storage in Miles City, intending to return him to Texas after the winter. He continues north with the cattle drive, despondent over losing his closest friend.

Eventually, the remaining members of the Hat Creek outfit establish a ranch in the fertile and ungrazed wilderness between the Missouri River and the Milk River. Call has depression all winter, no longer caring about the cattle drive or the ranch, and contemplating what to do about Newt. Before leaving in the spring, he puts Newt in charge of the ranch and gives him his horse, his rifle, and his family watch, but still cannot bring himself to publicly acknowledge the boy as his son. Newt is inwardly upset, but accepts the gifts, nonetheless. Call, ashamed of himself, leaves the ranch.

Call retrieves Gus's body, packed in a coffin with salt and charcoal, and begins the long journey south in an old buggy. In Nebraska, he gives Gus' letters to Clara and Lorena, and explains that Gus has left his half of the cattle interests to Lorena. Lorena is devastated by Gus' death and refuses to open her letter; standing silently by his coffin day and night, she suddenly faints. Clara considers the journey a whimsical folly typical of Gus, and urges Call to bury him on her ranch, instead, but Call refuses, having given Gus his word. Clara tells Call she despises him as a "vain coward" for refusing to claim Newt as his son, and he leaves Nebraska haunted by her condemnation.

The story of the cowboy transporting his dead friend's body spreads across the plains, and Call takes a circuitous route through Colorado and New Mexico to avoid the increasing attention. In Santa Rosa, he discovers that Blue Duck has been captured by a sheriff's deputy and is about to be hanged. Call visits Blue Duck in his jail cell, and Blue Duck taunts him, pointing out that he raided, killed, raped, and kidnapped with impunity throughout his life, despite the best efforts of the Texas Rangers. On the day of his hanging, on his way to the roof where the gallows await him, Blue Duck jumps out a third-story window, pulling along with him the sheriff's deputy who had caught him, killing them both.

Arriving back in Texas exhausted, despondent, and wounded from a bullet to his side, Call buries Gus by the spring in the orchard near San Antonio, true to his word. He then rides on to Lonesome Dove, where the cook Bolivar, who had abandoned the cattle drive before it left Texas, is delighted to see him again. In town, Call finds that the saloon has burned down; the proprietor, who had been madly in love with Lorena, committed suicide after her departure by burning down his saloon while he remained inside.

== Characters ==
- Captain Woodrow F. Call – A co-owner of the Hat Creek outfit and former Texas Ranger, he is a largely silent leader of men and tireless worker who believes firmly in discipline, duty, and honor; he is a foil to his best friend Gus. In his preface, McMurtry describes Call as a Stoic.
- Captain Augustus "Gus" McCrae – A co-owner of the Hat Creek outfit and former Texas Ranger, he is a lazy, loquacious, and charismatic rake with a fondness for alcohol, gambling, and whores; he is nonetheless a brave and competent fighter when required. He is tall and lanky, famed for his excellent eyesight, and has had silver hair since he was 30. He serves as a foil to his best friend, Call, and is described by McMurtry as an Epicurean.
- Pea Eye Parker – The wrangler and blacksmith of the Hat Creek Cattle Company, Pea Eye served as a corporal in the Rangers under Gus and Call. Pea Eye (his real first name long forgotten) is not especially bright, but he is brave, reliable, and kind. He follows Call's lead without question.
- Joshua Deets – An African-American former Ranger, Deets is a loyal ranch hand, and on the drive serves as the chief scout. He is an exceptional tracker who relies on his phenomenal instincts to lead the company out of harm's way. He is quiet and contemplative, but wise, compassionate, and trusted by all.
- Newt Dobbs – A 17-year-old orphan, he was raised by Gus and Call. His mother was a prostitute named Maggie, who died when he was a child. He knows his mother was a prostitute, but has no idea who his father might be. Most observers, notably Gus and Clara Allen, are confident Call is his father. Though he begins the journey awkward and inexperienced, Newt develops into a competent and reliable cowboy, and despite his young age, is eventually given leadership of the ranch in Call's absence. In his preface, McMurtry refers to Newt as "the lonesome dove of the title."
- Jake Spoon – A former Ranger, he left his friends 10 years ago to travel around America, returning to Texas near the beginning of the novel. Like Gus, Jake is a drinker, gambler, and womanizer. He possesses a great personal charm, but is lazy, selfish, and often careless.
- Dishwater "Dish" Boggett – Though only 22, Dish is a cowboy of great skill and the "top hand" for Call's cattle drive. He suffers greatly from unrequited love for Lorena Wood. His nickname derives from once having drunk dishwater on a cattle drive, being so thirsty that he could not wait for the water barrel.
- Bolivar – A former Mexican bandit and the cook for the Hat Creek Cattle Company, he is obsessed with loudly and unnecessarily ringing the dinner bell to call the company for dinner. Bolivar is uneasy about venturing far from the Rio Grande and abandons the cattle drive before it leaves Texas.
- Po Campo – The cattle drive's enigmatic new cook, he was hired by Call in San Antonio after Bolivar's departure. He uses exotic ingredients such as grasshoppers in his meals. He refuses to ride animals or even vehicles drawn by animals, which he considers an unnatural act. True to his principles, he covers the trek from Texas to Montana entirely on foot. He hints at being well-traveled, and also offhandedly remarks that he killed his wife.
- Lorena Wood – A beautiful young woman from Alabama, she was coerced into prostitution by a former lover, later turning up in Lonesome Dove, where she works as the town's only whore. Lorena is taciturn, strong-willed, and often intimidating to the numerous cowboys who seek her affection, generally viewing her clients and admirers with contempt. Discontented with her life, Lorena initially harbors a dream of traveling to San Francisco, but her perspective changes dramatically after her experiences during the cattle drive.
- Blue Duck – The son of Comanche war chief Buffalo Hump and his Mexican captive, Blue Duck leads a gang of renegade Indians and Caucasian criminals. Atrociously wicked and remorseless, he is feared across the plains as a ruthless murderer, rapist, and slaver. He has managed to evade the law even as the West gradually grows safer and more civilized.
- July Johnson – The sheriff of the town of Fort Smith, Arkansas, July is a kind young man recently married to Elmira, whom he deeply loves despite her being openly disdainful of him. After his brother Ben is accidentally killed by Jake Spoon, July sets off in pursuit of him.
- Elmira Johnson – A former whore from Kansas, she recently married July Johnson. She is unhappy with her life and has depression, eventually leaving Fort Smith to seek out her old love Dee Boot.
- Roscoe Brown – The deputy sheriff of Fort Smith, Arkansas, Roscoe is a simple man in his 40s who is content to spend his life minding the sleepy town's jail, but is bullied by July's sister-in-law into tracking down the sheriff and his missing wife.
- Joe – Elmira's son, he travels with July to find and arrest Jake Spoon.
- Janey – A young girl whom Roscoe meets on his journey to find July, she was a slave to an old man living alone in the woods, but when Roscoe arrives, she escapes from captivity and travels with him, proving herself useful with her ability to catch animals to eat and her excellent aim when throwing rocks.
- Clara Allen – Gus' former love, she declined his repeated marriage proposals during their youth in Texas – for reasons that were never entirely clear to Gus – instead marrying the horse trader Bob Allen and moving to a ranch near Ogallala, Nebraska. She still grieves for her sons who died of respiratory disease from the sod house in which Bob and she first lived, and treasures her daughters.
- Jimmy and Ben Rainey, Bill and Pete Spettle, Soupy Jones, Needle Nelson, Jasper Fant, Bert Borum, Lippy Jones, Sean and Allen O'Brien – These other hands were hired by Call to work the cattle drive.

== Reception ==
Lonesome Dove was the winner of the 1986 Pulitzer Prize in Fiction, and received favorable reviews. In The New York Times, Nicholas Lemann praised the novel as "thrilling and almost perfectly realized," calling it "the great cowboy novel". Writing for The Washington Post, Noel Perrin praised the dialogue and the breadth of the plot, viewing each scene as "freshly realized". Perrin, however, criticized some characters as one-dimensional and only briefly used.

McMurtry himself eventually expressed dissatisfaction with the popularity of the novel, particularly after the miniseries adaptation. In the preface to the 2000 edition, he wrote: "It's hard to go wrong if one writes at length about the Old West, still the phantom leg of the American psyche. I thought I had written about a harsh time and some pretty harsh people, but to the public at large, I had produced something nearer to an idealization; instead of a poor man's Inferno, filled with violence, faithlessness, and betrayal, I had actually delivered a kind of Gone with the Wind of the West, a turnabout I'll be mulling over for a long, long time."

Assessing the novel's cultural legacy in 2019, Nasrullah Mambrol was more sympathetic than the author's self-assessment. "What McMurtry did was to reinvent the Western novel by taking its basic elements and elevating them to the level of epic." He reached "the height of his powers" with Lonesome Dove.

President Barack Obama awarded McMurtry with a National Humanities Medal in 2015, noting that readers of Lonesome Dove "found out something essential about their own souls, even if they'd never been out West or been on a ranch". Stephen King has described Lonesome Dove as his favorite book of all time.

== Adaptations ==
=== CBS miniseries ===
A television miniseries adaptation produced by Motown Productions was broadcast on CBS in 1989, starring Robert Duvall as Augustus McCrae and Tommy Lee Jones as Woodrow F. Call. The series was a commercial and critical success.

=== Netflix series ===
In February 2025, it was reported that Teton Ridge Entertainment had acquired the rights of Lonesome Dove novel series for future television and film adaptations.

In May 2026, Netflix greenlit Lonesome Dove, which is envisioned as an ongoing series adaptation of the novel. It was officially confirmed by the streamer in September 2026. Zoe Kazan and Jeb Stuart serve as co-showrunners and writers. They are also executive producers alongside Thomas Tull, Jillian Share and Jen Gorton of Teton Ridge Entertainment; Jon Jashni; Larry McMurtry’s creative partner Diana Ossana; and Curtis McMurtry of the McMurtry Estate.

== Historical references ==
According to McMurtry, Gus and Call were not modeled after historical characters, but similarities exist with real-life cattle drivers Charles Goodnight and Oliver Loving. When Goodnight and Loving's African-American guide Bose Ikard died, Goodnight carved a wooden grave marker for him, just as Call does for Deets. Upon Loving's death, Goodnight brought him home to be buried in Texas, as Call does for Augustus. (Goodnight himself appears as a minor but generally sympathetic character in this novel, and more so in the sequel, Streets of Laredo, and the prequels Dead Man's Walk and Comanche Moon.) Blue Duck also was a historical person, a paramour of Belle Starr, "Queen of the Oklahoma Outlaws".

According to McMurtry's memoir, Books: A Memoir, the ultimate sources for Gus and Call were Don Quixote, the crazy old knight, and Sancho Panza, the peasant pragmatist, from Don Quixote. He stated: "What is important that, early on, I read some version of Don Quixote and pondered the grave differences (comically cast) between Sancho and the Don. Between the two is where fiction, as I've mostly read and written it, lives."

Other books of the Lonesome Dove series feature other prominent historic events and locations such as the Texan Santa Fe Expedition, the Great Raid of 1840, and the King Ranch, and characters such as Buffalo Hump, John Wesley Hardin, and Judge Roy Bean.

== See also ==
- Andy Adams, who wrote Log of a Cowboy, an account of a five-month drive of 3,000 cattle from Brownsville, Texas, to Montana in 1882 along the Great Western Cattle Trail

== Bibliography ==
- McMurtry, Larry. (1985). Lonesome Dove: A Novel. New York: Simon & Schuster. ISBN 0-671-50420-7
