= 24th Writers Guild of America Awards =

24th WGA Awards
- Date: 1972
- Organized by: Writers Guild of America, East and the Writers Guild of America, West

The 24th Writers Guild of America Awards honored the best film writers and television writers of 1971. Winners were announced in 1972.

== Winners and nominees ==
=== Film ===
Winners are listed first highlighted in boldface.

**Best Drama Written Directly for the Screen**: **Sunday Bloody Sunday, Screenplay by Penelope Gilliatt**; Klute, Written by Andy Lewis and Dave Lewis; Summer of '42, Written by Herman Raucher; The Hellstrom Chronicle, Written by David Seltzer	**Best Comedy Written Directly for the Screen**: **The Hospital, Written by Paddy Chayefsky**; Bananas, Written by Woody Allen and Mickey Rose; Carnal Knowledge, Written by Jules Feiffer; Made for Each Other, Written by Renée Taylor and Joseph Bologna; Taking Off, Written by Miloš Forman, Jean-Claude Carrière, John Guare and Jon Klein
**Best Drama Adapted from Another Medium**: **The French Connection, Screenplay by Ernest Tidyman; based on the book by Robin Moore**; A Clockwork Orange, Screenplay by Stanley Kubrick; based on the novel by Anthony Burgess; Johnny Got His Gun, Screenplay by Dalton Trumbo; based on his novel; McCabe & Mrs. Miller, Screenplay by Robert Altman and Brian McKay; based on the novel by Edmund Naughton; The Last Picture Show, Screenplay by Larry McMurtry and Peter Bogdanovich; based on the novel by Larry McMurtry	**Best Comedy Adapted from Another Medium**: **Kotch, Screenplay by John Paxton; based on the novel by Katharine Topkins**; A New Leaf, Screenplay by Elaine May; based on the story "The Green Heart" by Jack Ritchie; Fiddler on the Roof, Screenplay by Joseph Stein; based on the novel by Sholom Aleichem; Little Murders, Screenplay by Jules Feiffer; based on his play; The Boy Friend, Screenplay by Ken Russell; based on the musical by Sandy Wilson

=== Television ===
**Episodic Comedy**: **"Thoroughly Unmilitant Mary" – The Mary Tyler Moore Show (CBS) – Martin Cohan**; "Archie's Aching Back" – All in the Family (CBS) – Stanley Ralph Ross; "Mike's Problem" – All in the Family (CBS) – Alan J. Levitt, and Phil Mishkin; "Gloria Has a Belly Full" – All in the Family (CBS) – Jerry Mayer; "Edith's Accident" – All in the Family (CBS) – Michael Ross, Bernard West, Alfred Lewis Levitt, and Helen Levitt; "Christmas Day at the Bunkers" – All in the Family (CBS) – Don Nicholl	**Episodic Drama**: **"Par for the Course" – The Psychiatrist (NBC) – T.Y Drake, Herbe Bermann, Jerrold Freedman, and Bo May**; "Murder by the Book" – Columbo (NBC) – Steven Bochco; "F.O.B. Honolulu: Part I & II" – Hawaii Five-O (CBS) – Jerry Ludwig, and Eric Bercovici; "No Motive for Murder" – Ironside (NBC) – Sy Salkowitz; "They Grow Up" – Marcus Welby, M.D. (ABC) – Dick Nelson; "Until Proven Innocent" – Owen Marshall, Counselor at Law (ABC) –Pat Fielder; "The Invasion of Kevin Ireland" – Bold Ones: The Lawyers (NBC) – Jack B. Sowards; "Angry Man" – Bold Ones: The New Doctors (NBC) – Howard Dimsdale

=== Special awards ===
Laurel Award for Screenwriting Achievement

**Ernest Lehman**

Valentine Davies Award

**Michael Blankfort**

Morgan Cox Award

**Allen Rivkin**
