= McCabe & Mrs. Miller =

1971 film by Robert Altman

- Theatrical release poster by Richard Amsel
- Directed by: Robert Altman
- Screenplay by: Robert Altman; Brian McKay
- Based on: McCabe (1959 novel) by Edmund Naughton
- Produced by: David Foster; Mitchell Brower
- Starring: Warren Beatty; Julie Christie; René Auberjonois
- Cinematography: Vilmos Zsigmond
- Edited by: Louis Lombardo
- Production company: David Foster Productions
- Distributed by: Warner Bros. Pictures
- Release date: June 24, 1971
- Running time: 121 minutes
- Country: United States
- Language: English
- Box office: $8.2 million

McCabe & Mrs. Miller is a 1971 American revisionist Western film directed by Robert Altman and starring Warren Beatty and Julie Christie. The screenplay by Altman and Brian McKay is based on the 1959 novel McCabe by Edmund Naughton. Set in Washington State during the early 1900s, the film follows a mysterious gambler and alleged shootist (Beatty) who recruits a British madam (Christie) to run a boomtown brothel, later running afoul of powerful business interests.

Altman referred to it as an "anti-Western" film because it ignores or subverts a number of Western conventions. The film is also noted for its cinematography by Vilmos Zsigmond, and its soundtrack, which features several songs by Leonard Cohen. Filming took place in British Columbia, Canada in the fall and winter of 1970, and the film was released by Warner Bros. Pictures on June 24, 1971.

McCabe & Mrs. Miller has received critical acclaim in the years since its release and earned an Oscar nomination for Christie in the Best Actress category. The film was deemed the 8th greatest Western of all time by the American Film Institute in its AFI's 10 Top 10 list in 2008 and, in 2010, was selected for preservation in the United States National Film Registry by the Library of Congress as being "culturally, historically or aesthetically significant".

== Plot ==
In 1902, a mysterious gambler named John McCabe arrives in the unincorporated boomtown of Presbyterian Church, Washington, named after its only substantial building, a tall but mostly unused chapel. McCabe quickly takes a dominant position over the town's simple-minded and lethargic inhabitants, thanks to his aggressive personality and persistent rumors that he is actually a notorious gunfighter known as "Pudgy" McCabe.

To support himself, McCabe establishes a makeshift brothel, consisting of three sex workers purchased for $200 from a pimp in the nearby town of Bearpaw. British cockney madam Constance Miller arrives and persuades McCabe to let her manage his brothel while he focuses on running a gambling hall. The two become financially successful business partners, turning their small business into the largest in town, and a romantic relationship develops between the two, though she charges him for sex.

As the town becomes richer, Sears and Hollander, a pair of agents from the Harrison Shaughnessy Mining Company in Bearpaw, arrive to buy out McCabe's business, as well as the surrounding zinc mines. Harrison Shaughnessy is notorious for having people killed when they refuse to sell. McCabe does not want to sell at their initial price of $5,500 but overplays his hand in negotiations by demanding too high an asking price. The agents leave in disgust, and Miller warns him that they will not return to negotiate and that his life is in danger.

Hired guns Butler, Breed and the Kid arrive in town with a contract to kill McCabe. Appearing fearful, McCabe relents and agrees to sell. Butler refuses to parlay, declaring that McCabe is a fraud and has never killed anyone in his life. McCabe goes back to Bearpaw to find the agents, but after learning that neither are still around, he visits a lawyer, Clement Samuels, in the hopes of resolving the dispute peacefully. The lawyer, an aspiring politician, boosts McCabe's confidence and convinces him not to give in by arguing that he can set an example by standing up to Harrison Shaughnessy.

McCabe returns to town and tries to hide in the chapel, but the pastor grabs his shotgun and chases him out before being fatally shot by Butler. A broken lantern starts a fire in the church and the townspeople rush to help extinguish it. McCabe manages to kill Breed and the Kid in ambushes, but the Kid is able to wound him before dying. As the townsfolk mobilize to fight the chapel fire, McCabe is gunned down by Butler, using a hunting rifle; as Butler attempts to verify the kill, McCabe pulls a derringer and kills him. As the townspeople celebrate extinguishing the fire, McCabe dies alone in the snow, while Mrs. Miller lies sedated in an opium den.

== Cast ==
Credits from AFI Catalog of Feature Films:

- Warren Beatty as John McCabe
- Julie Christie as Constance Miller
- René Auberjonois as Patrick Sheehan
- William Devane as Clement Samuels
- John Schuck as Smalley
- Corey Fischer as Mr. Elliot
- Shelley Duvall as Ida Coyle
- Bert Remsen as Bart Coyle
- Keith Carradine as Cowboy
- Michael Murphy as Eugene Sears
- Antony Holland as Ernest Hollander
- Hugh Millais as Butler
- Manfred Schulz as "Kid"
- Jace Van Der Veen as "Breed"
- Jeremy Newson as Jeremy Berg
- Jack Riley as Riley Quinn
- Tom Hill as Archer
- Linda Sorensen as Blanche
- Janet Wright as Eunice
- Maysie Hoy as Maisie
- Elisabeth Knight as "Birdie"
- Jackie Crossland as Lily
- Elizabeth Murphy as Kate
- Carey Lee McKenzie as Alma
- Linda Kupecek as Ruth
- Wayne Robson as The Barkeep
- Wes Taylor as "Shorty" Dunn
- Wayne Grace as Munson
- Anne Cameron as Mrs. Dunn
- Graeme Campbell as Billy Cubbs
- Terence Kelly as Quigley
- Don Francks as "Buffalo"
- Brantley Kearns as The Fiddler
- Rodney Gage as Sumner Washington
- Lili Francks as Mrs. Washington
- Alex Diakun as Townsman

== Themes ==
Film historian James Bernardoni in his book The New Hollywood (1991) locates the central theme of the picture within an inherent conflict between human individuality and the requirements of community in a capitalist society. Bernardoni maintains that Robert Altman delivers these personal and social struggles relentlessly — "in every sequence, virtually every frame"— through his handling of Mise-en-scène.

The denouement depicts the mortally wounded McCabe dying alone in a snowbank, and Mrs. Miller, unaware of this demise, descending into a death-like opium trance. As such, "a nuanced, compelling, iconoclastic meditation on the great western theme of the reconciliation of the individual and the community, comes to the end."

== Production ==
=== Development ===
McCabe & Mrs. Miller is based on Edmund Naughton's 1959 novel McCabe. David Foster, one of the film's producers, had purchased the film rights to the novel in 1968; he'd learned of the novel while negotiating with Ellen Wright (the widow of novelist Richard Wright) over the rights to The Mandarins, a novel by Simone de Beauvoir. Wright was acting as the agent for Naughton, who was then living in Paris and working for the International Herald Tribune. With his partner, Mitchell Brower, Foster then negotiated a deal with the Fox studio for two films. By October, 1968, Foster had commissioned a screenplay from Ben Maddow, a well-known poet and screenwriter.

In 1969, Altman was in post-production on M*A*S*H and snuck Foster into the screening; Foster liked the film and signed Altman to direct a film based on McCabe. They agreed to wait until M*A*S*H became a box-office hit to take the pitch for McCabe to a studio for funding. A second screenplay – independent of Maddow's – was commissioned from television writer Brian McKay, who completed it in only five weeks. A revised version of that screenplay dated July 1970 became the "shooting script" for the film. Altman and McKay are listed in the film's credits as its screenwriters; Maddow went uncredited.

Altman offered the lead to Elliott Gould who turned it down to make I Love My Wife. "Bob said, 'You're making the mistake of your life'," said Gould. "There was a part of me that was not developed at all and that had no real understanding about what the woman is. Bob wanted to cast Patricia Quinn as Mrs. Miller, and I hadn't seen Alice's Restaurant and I hadn't met her. I had some misconceptions because I wanted her to have the same relationship with Altman as I had. I recently watched Alice's Restaurant and she's great. Altman was so right."

Foster called Warren Beatty in England, about the film; Beatty flew to New York City to see M*A*S*H and then flew to Los Angeles, California to sign for McCabe.

The film was originally called The Presbyterian Church Wager, after a bet placed among the church's few attendees, about whether McCabe would survive his refusal of the offer to buy his property. Altman reported that an official in the Presbyterian Church called Warner Bros. to complain about having its church mentioned in a film about brothels and gambling. The complaint prompted a name change to John Mac Cabe but it was released as McCabe & Mrs. Miller.

=== Filming ===
The film was shot in British Columbia, Canada – in West Vancouver and in Squamish. The film was shot almost in sequential order, a rarity for film makers. The crew found a suitable location for the filming and built up the "set", as McCabe built up the town in the film. Mrs. Miller is brought into town on a J. I. Case 80 HP steam engine from 1912; the steam engine is genuine and functioning and the crew used it to power the lumbermill after its arrival. Carpenters for the film were locals and young men from the United States, fleeing conscription into the Vietnam War; they were dressed in period costume and used tools of the period, so that they could go about their business in the background, while the plot advanced in the foreground.

The crew ran buried hoses throughout the town, placed so they could create the appearance of rain. Since the city of Vancouver generally receives a great deal of rain, it was usually only necessary to turn on the hoses to make scenes shot on the rare days when it didn't rain, to match those shot on days when it did.

It began snowing near the end of shooting, when the church fire and the standoff were the only scenes left. Beatty did not want to start shooting in the snow, as it was financially risky to do so: to preserve continuity, the rest of the film would have to be shot in snow. Altman countered that since those were the only scenes left to film, it was best to start since there was nothing else to do. The "standoff" scene—which is in fact more a "cat and mouse" scene involving shooting one's enemy in the back—and its concurrent church fire scene, were shot over nine days. The heavy snow, with the exception of a few "fill-in" patches on the ground, was genuine; the crew members built snowmen and had snowball fights between takes.

The film, especially the final scene, is atypical of the western genre. The showdown between a reluctant protagonist and his enemies takes place ungracefully in the snow during the early hours, rather than at "high noon". Instead of hiding indoors and watching the battle unfold outside, the townsfolk are bustling in the streets and largely unaware of the gunfight taking place in their midst. For a distinctive look, Altman and Zsigmond chose to "flash" (pre-fog) the film negative before its eventual exposure, as well as use a number of filters on the cameras, rather than manipulate the film in post-production; in this way the studio could not force him to change the film's look to something less distinctive.

=== Editing ===
The editing of McCabe & Mrs. Miller took much longer than its filming. Altman and Lou Lombardo, the editor and second unit director, spent nine months editing the film in North Vancouver, close to the location of the filming itself. The editing was an innovation in its time because the principal storyline about John McCabe and Constance Miller occupies relatively little of the film's running time, especially in the first half of the film. Pauline Kael emphasized this in her 1971 review of the film. She wrote,

The classical story is only a thread in the story that Altman is telling ... The people who drop in and out of the place—a primitive mining town—are not just background for McCabe and Mrs. Miller; McCabe and Mrs. Miller are simply the two most interesting people in the town, and we catch their stories in glimpses, as they interact with the other characters and each other ... Lives are picked up and let go, and the sense of how little we know about them becomes part of the texture; we generally know little about the characters in movies, but since we're assured that that little is all we need to know, and thus all there is to know, we're not bothered by it. Here we seem to be witnesses to a vision of the past ...

This aspect of the film's editing also carried through into the film's unusual sound editing, which can blend many conversations and noises and does not emphasize the principal characters. In his textbook on film production, Bruce Mamer wrote,

Robert Altman was famous for using this style of layered dialogue cutting. The frontier barroom scene that opens his McCabe & Mrs. Miller (Louis Lombardo, editor) has snippets of conversations underlying the foreground action.

Ken Dancyger describes the effect in terms of its undermining of dialogue as an element in the film,

Many characters speak simultaneously, and we are aware of the discreteness of their conversations, but as their comments bleed into those of others, the effect is to undermine the dialogue. The scene moves dialogue from the informational status it usually occupies to the category of noise. Language becomes a sound effect. When we do hear the dialogue, it is the speaker who is important rather than what is being said.

Similarly, Jay Beck writes

McCabe & Mrs. Miller represents the full-scale launch of the practice of overlapping dialogue in Altman's cinema. The visual and acoustic strategies in the film avoid foregrounding the main characters in the narrative and the audience has to work to follow the story, or stories, as they unfold.

=== Leonard Cohen's songs ===
Other than the music occurring in the ordinary life of Presbyterian Church, the only music for the film is from three songs composed and performed by Leonard Cohen, a Canadian poet who had released his first album of songs in 1967. Their importance is emphasized by Scott Tobias, who wrote in 2014 that "The film is unimaginable to me without the Cohen songs, which function as these mournful interstitials that unify the entire movie."

Altman had liked Cohen's debut album, Songs of Leonard Cohen (1967), immensely, buying additional copies of it after wearing out each vinyl record. He had then forgotten about the album. A few years later, Altman visited Paris, just after finishing shooting McCabe & Mrs. Miller, and rediscovered Cohen's album. He had Lou Lombardo, the film's editor, use the music to maintain a rhythm for the film (in effect using it as a "temp" track). He later said, "I think the reason they worked was because those lyrics were etched in my subconscious, so when I shot the scenes I fitted them to the songs, as if they were written for them."

Altman didn't expect to be able to procure rights for Cohen's music since McCabe was a Warner Brothers film and Cohen's album was released through Columbia Records. He called Cohen, expecting to trade off his recent success with M*A*S*H, but found that Cohen had no knowledge of it. Instead, Cohen had loved Altman's less popular follow-up film Brewster McCloud. Cohen arranged for his record company to license the music cheaply, even writing into the contract that sales of that album after the release of McCabe would turn some of the royalties to Altman (an arrangement which at the time was quite unusual). The three Cohen songs used in the film were "The Stranger Song", "Sisters of Mercy" and "Winter Lady". They were released together on a 7-inch single in France in 1971, and other European countries during 1972.

== Release ==
=== Box office ===
With poor initial reviews, the film did not perform well at the box office in New York, but it was more successful in other parts of the country. Warner Bros., encouraged by Beatty, rereleased the film at the Coronet Theatre in New York in August 1971 along with a new advertising campaign, and its box-office performance improved upon that of the original release.

The film earned an estimated $4 million in theatrical rentals in the United States and Canada.

=== Home media ===
Warner Home Video released a Region 1 DVD in 2002. The Criterion Collection released a 4K digital transfer of the film on Blu-ray and DVD on October 11, 2016. A new 4K UHD physical release from Criterion was released in February, 2024.

== Reception ==
=== Contemporary U.S. reviews ===
The film opened without advance screenings at the Criterion and Loew's Cine theaters in New York City and received mostly negative reviews from the New York daily newspapers including one from Vincent Canby of The New York Times, who wrote that the film dragged its storyline out with such "tired symbolism ... that the effect is to undercut its narrative drive and the dignity of its fiction." It was also panned by Rex Reed, who called it "an incoherent, amateurish, simple-minded, boring and totally worthless piece of garbage" and "an insult to the intelligence of anyone stupid or masochistic enough to sit through it"; he added that "at the screening I attended Wednesday night, there were so many boos and hisses and programs thrown at the screen I thought the enraged audience was going to burn down the theater. I wouldn't have blamed them." However, the weekly critics raved about the film including Judith Crist and Pauline Kael of The New Yorker who called it "a beautiful pipe dream of a movie—a fleeting, almost diaphanous vision of what frontier life might have been," adding, "The movie is so affecting it leaves one rather dazed." Kael goes on to laud Altman, saying he has a "gift for creating an atmosphere of living interrelationships and doing it so obliquely that the viewer can't quite believe it."

As well, Kathleen Carroll of the New York Daily News gave the film three-and-a-half stars out of four and said that "again Altman never states or explains. He suggests the passing of time and one has to catch his clues. His concern is not to unravel a plot, but to capture an atmosphere or a feeling and this he does beautifully even to the point of softening the color so that the film has a faded, antique look to it."

Roger Ebert gave the film four stars out of four and wrote that it "is like no other Western ever made, and with it, Robert Altman earns his place as one of the best contemporary directors." He later added the film to his "Great Movies" list, where he said "Robert Altman has made a dozen films that can be called great in one way or another, but one of them is perfect, and that one is McCabe & Mrs. Miller (1971)." Gene Siskel also awarded it four stars and called it "a brilliant film, not because of the story, but because of the way in which it is told ... To construct such delicate scenes is the hallmark of fine film making and Altman is clearly a master." Charles Champlin of the Los Angeles Times called the film "interesting" but "as uneven as the stare of a cheap mirror." Gary Arnold of The Washington Post wrote, "Once again Altman brings a special way of life casually but vibrantly alive. 'McCabe' is an imaginative triumph partly in a visible, technical sense—a meticulous, conventionally authentic reconstruction of a frontier town—but principally in an emotional sense—a deeply felt and stirring romantic vision of frontier society."

=== Contemporary Canadian reviews ===
Les Wedman of the Vancouver Sun noted that "locally, the initial interest is that the movie was shot last winter in West Vancouver and Squamish, but it is going to take more than the stunning and scenic photography of Vilmos [Zsigmond] and the presence of local actors on the screen to sustain audiences even here. And unfortunately, even with varying degrees of performance and the drawing power of stars Warren Beatty and Julie Christie, McCabe and Mrs. Miller doesn't have much else." James Spears, however, wrote in The Province that the film "is a beautiful dream, and an important part of the dream of Vancouver." Daniel Stoffman of The Toronto Star called it "an hour and a half of Warren Beatty mumbling, Julie Christie scowling, and Leonard Cohen droning on the sound track. It's not much else." Dave Lanken of the Montreal Gazette said that "for director Robert Altman, McCabe must be a source of satisfaction. So different from his M*A*S*H or his Brewster [McCloud], but another little masterpiece." A critic in the Montreal Star called the film "a beautiful but sometimes pretentious outdoors saga."

=== Retrospective reviews ===
On review aggregator Rotten Tomatoes, the film holds an approval rating of 85% based on 60 reviews, with an average score of 8.70/10. The website's critical consensus reads, "McCabe & Mrs. Miller offers revisionist Western fans a landmark early addition to the genre while marking an early apogee for director Robert Altman." On Metacritic, the film received a score of 93 based on 17 reviews, indicating "universal acclaim". McCabe & Mrs. Miller received five votes in the British Film Institute's 2012 Sight & Sound polls, and in a later BBC poll was voted the 16th greatest American film ever made. In a 2009 interview, the film critic A.O. Scott named it one of his five favorite films.

=== Accolades ===
Award	Year	Category	Work	Result
Academy Award	1972	Best Actress	Julie Christie	Nominated
BAFTA Award	1973	Best Cinematography	Vilmos Zsigmond	Nominated (Note: Jointly nominated for Deliverance and Images.)
National Society of Film Critics Award	1971	Best Cinematography	Vilmos Zsigmond	3rd place (Note: Tied with Billy Williams for Sunday Bloody Sunday.)
Writers Guild of America Award	1972	Best Drama Adapted from Another Media	Robert Altman, Brian McKay	Nominated

In 2010, McCabe & Mrs. Miller was selected for preservation in the United States National Film Registry by the Library of Congress as being "culturally, historically or aesthetically significant".

In June 2008, the American Film Institute revealed its AFI's 10 Top 10—the best ten films in ten "classic" American film genres—after polling over 1,500 people from the creative community. McCabe & Mrs. Miller was acknowledged as the eighth best film in the Western genre.

== See also ==
- List of American films of 1971

== Sources ==
- Bernardoni, James. 1991. The New Hollywood: What the Movies Did with the New Freedoms of the Seventies. McFarland & Co., Jefferson, North Carolina ISBN 0-89950-627-5
