= 29th Golden Globe Awards =

Film award ceremony in 1972

- Date: February 6, 1972

The 29th Golden Globe Awards, honoring the best in film and television for 1971, were held on February 6, 1972.

== Winners and nominees ==
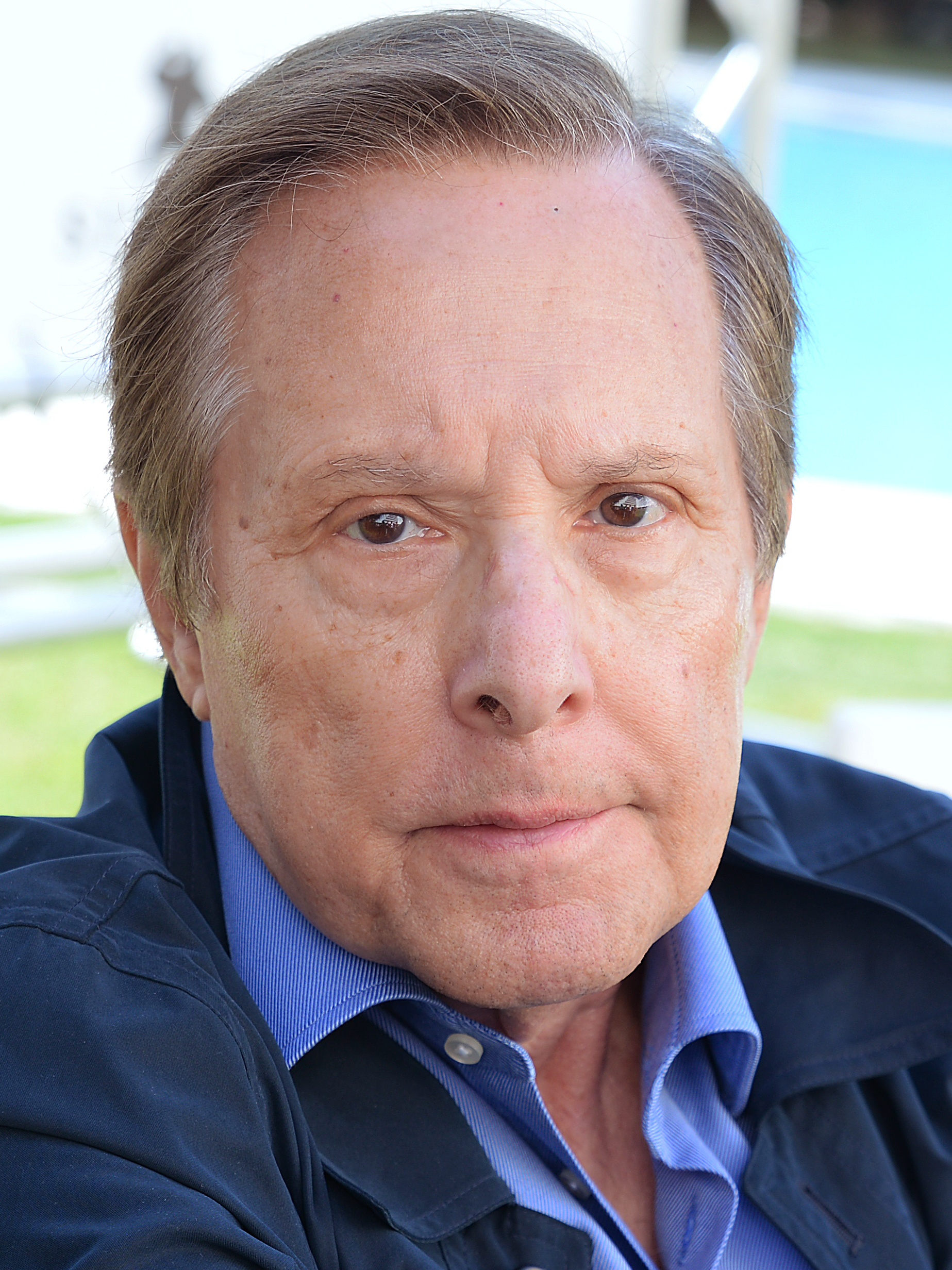
William Friedkin, Best Director, winner

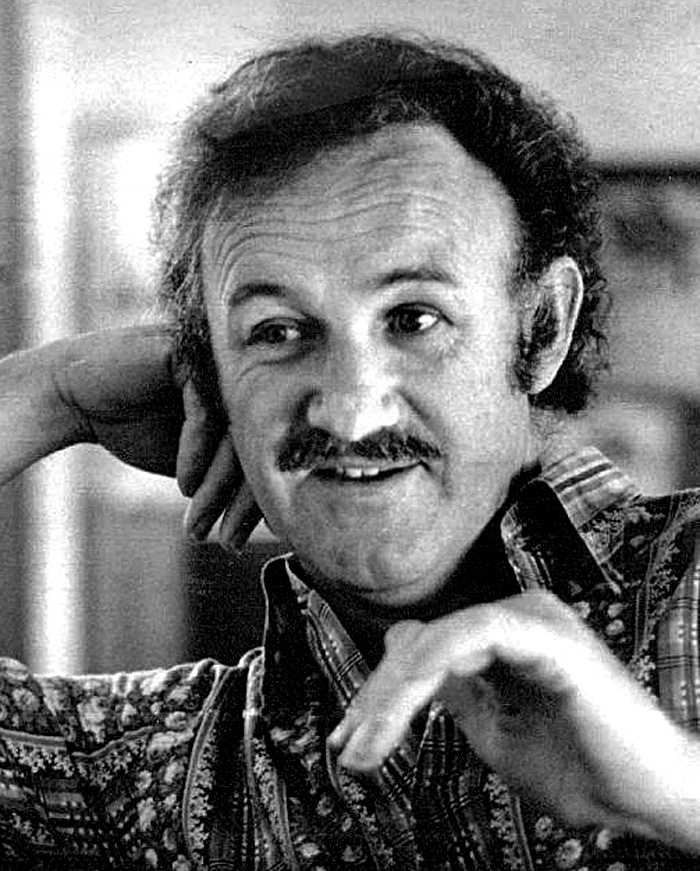
Gene Hackman, Best Actor in a Motion Picture – Drama winner

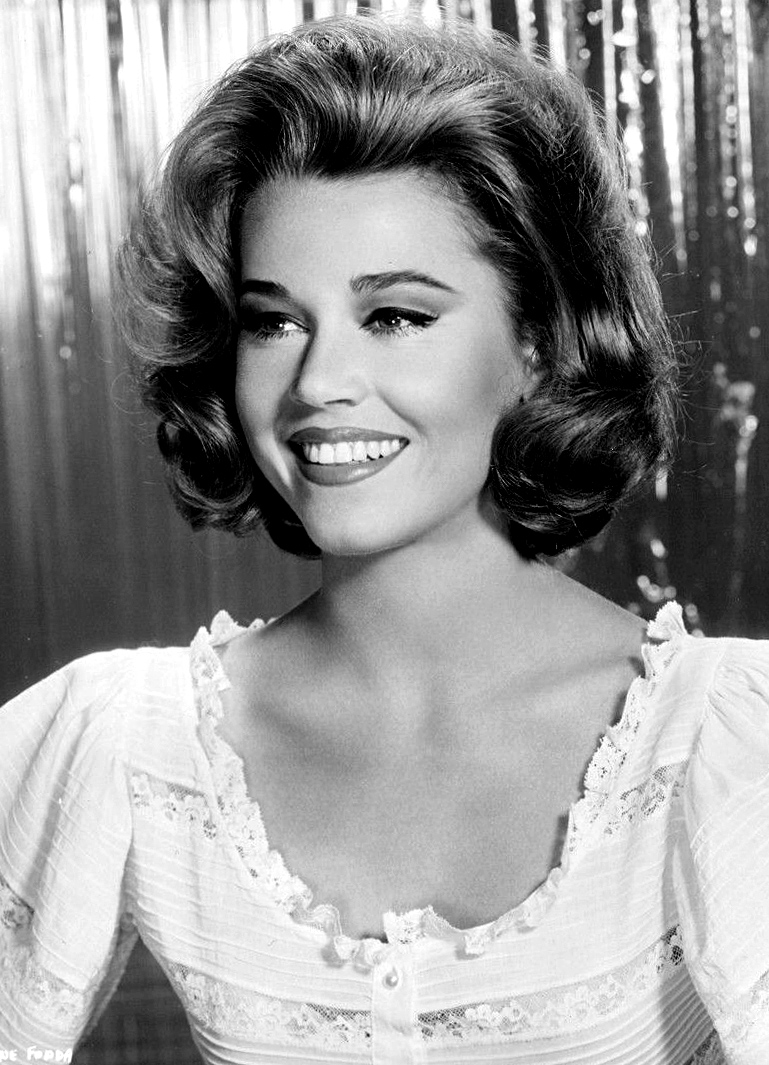
Jane Fonda, Best Actress in a Motion Picture – Drama winner

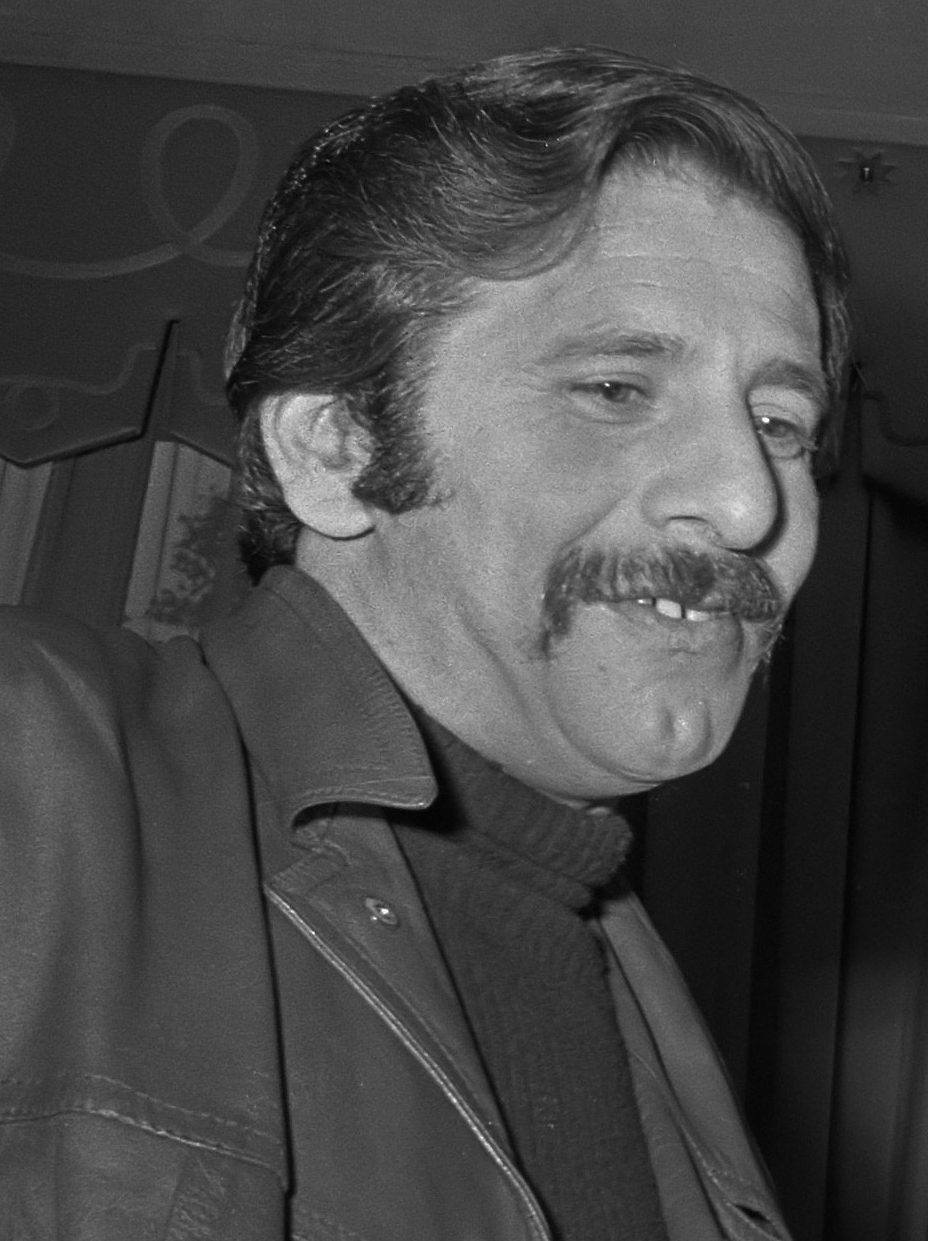
Chaim Topol, Best Actor in a Motion Picture – Musical or Comedy winner

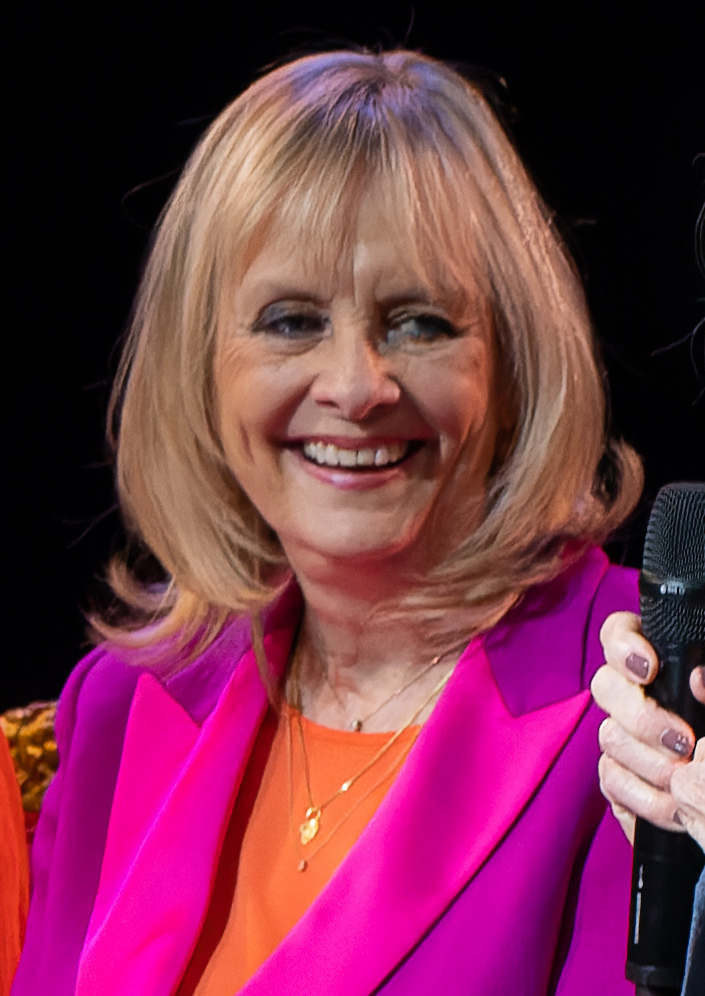
Twiggy, Best Actress in a Motion Picture – Musical or Comedy winner

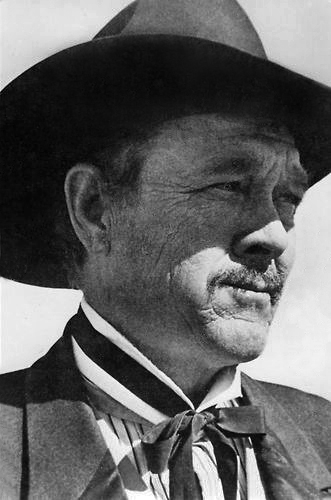
Ben Johnson, Best Supporting Actor in a Motion Picture, winner

Ann-Margret, Best Supporting Actress in a Motion Picture, winner

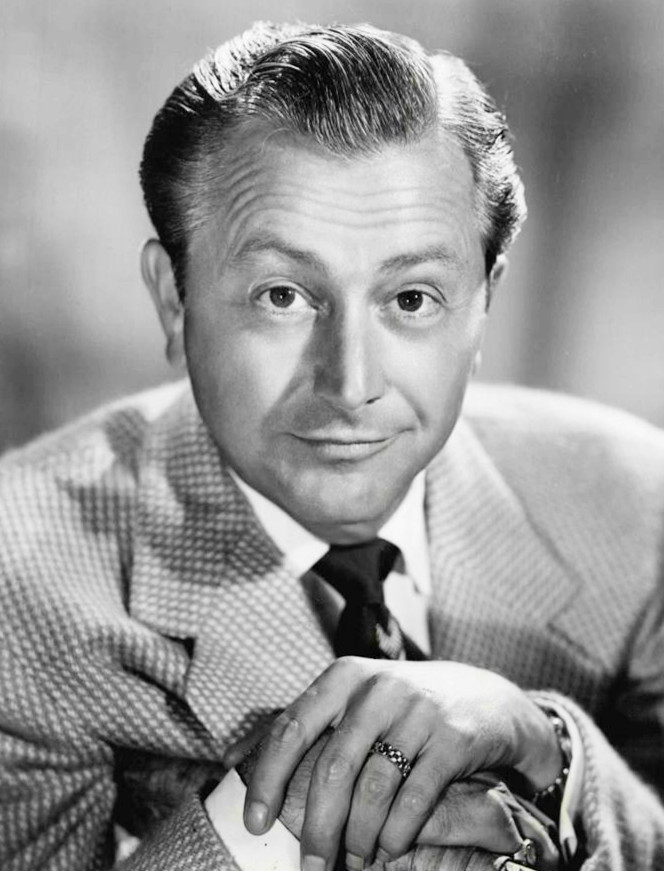
Robert Young, Best Actor in a Television Series, Drama winner

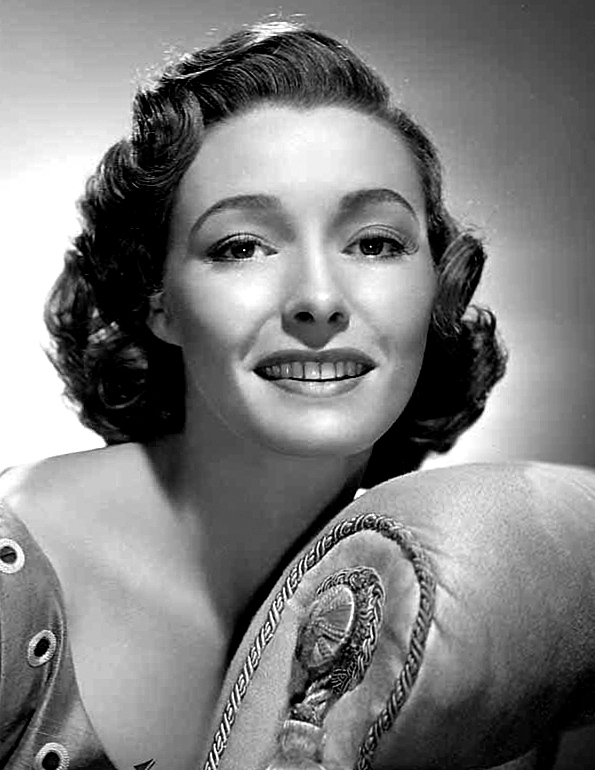
Patricia Neal, Best Actress in a Television Series, Drama winner

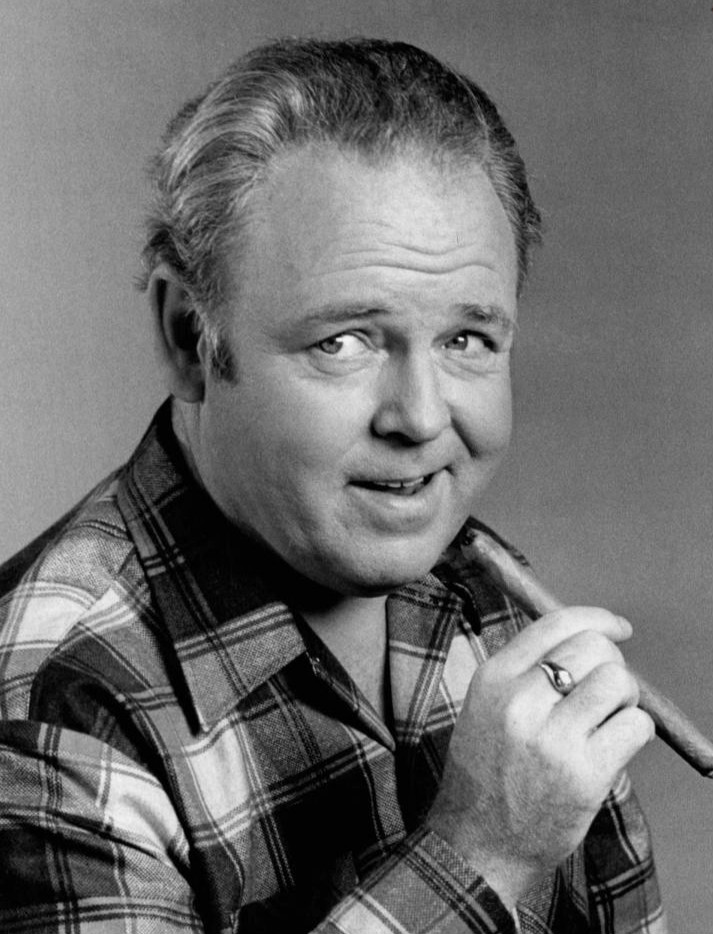
Carroll O'Connor, Best Actor in a Television Series, Comedy or Musical winner

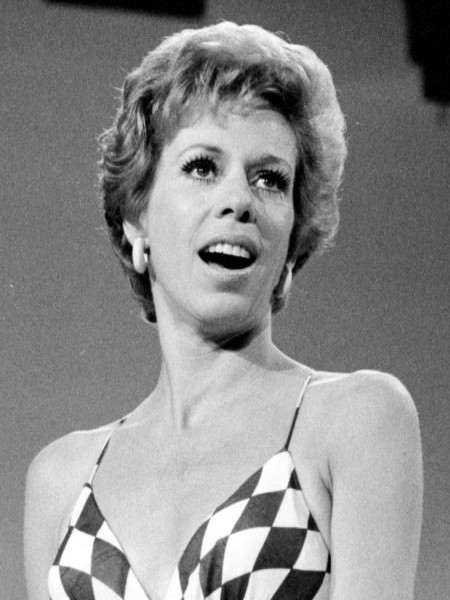
Carol Burnett, Best Actress in a Television Series, Comedy or Musical winner

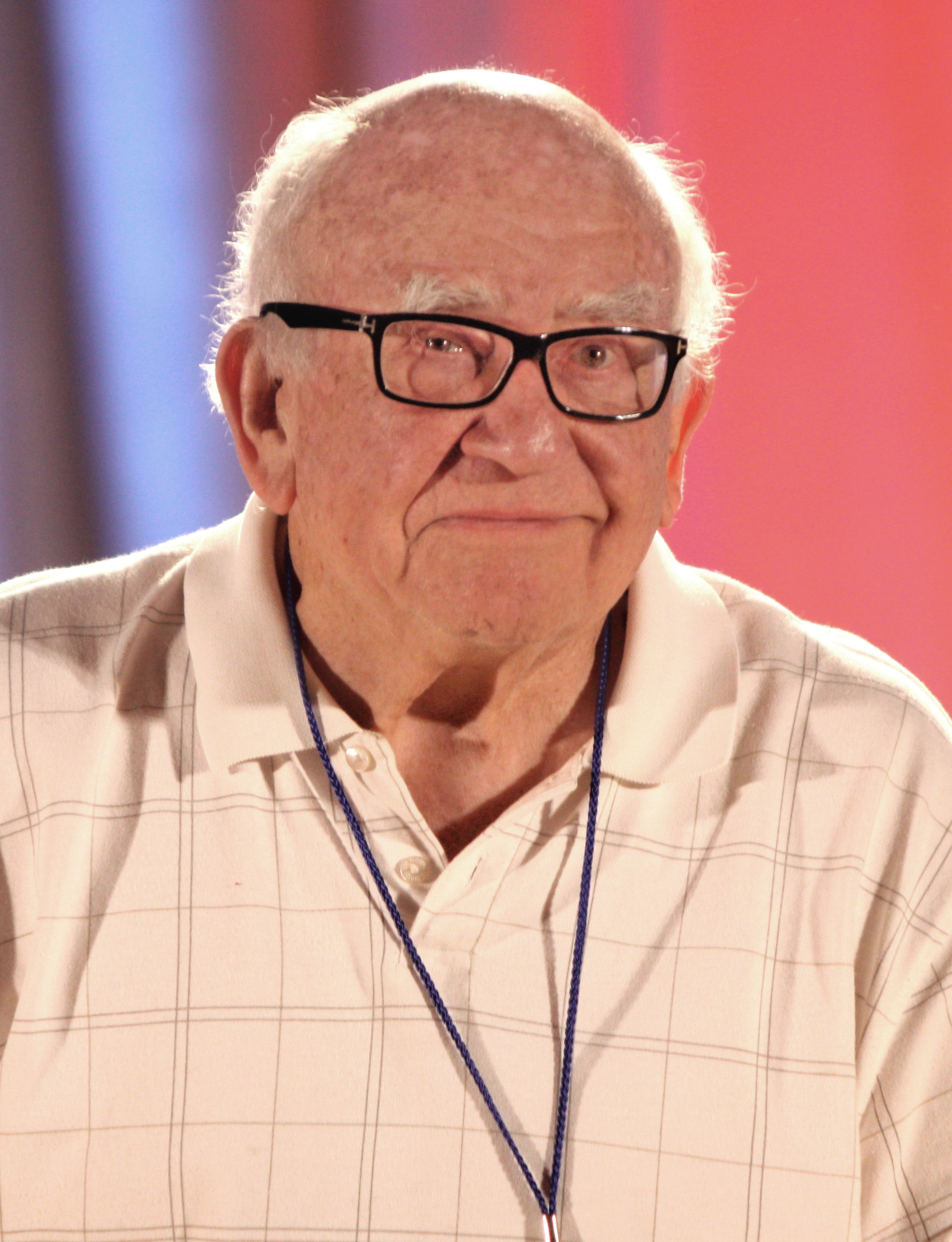
Ed Asner, Best Supporting Actor in a Series, Miniseries, or Television Film winner

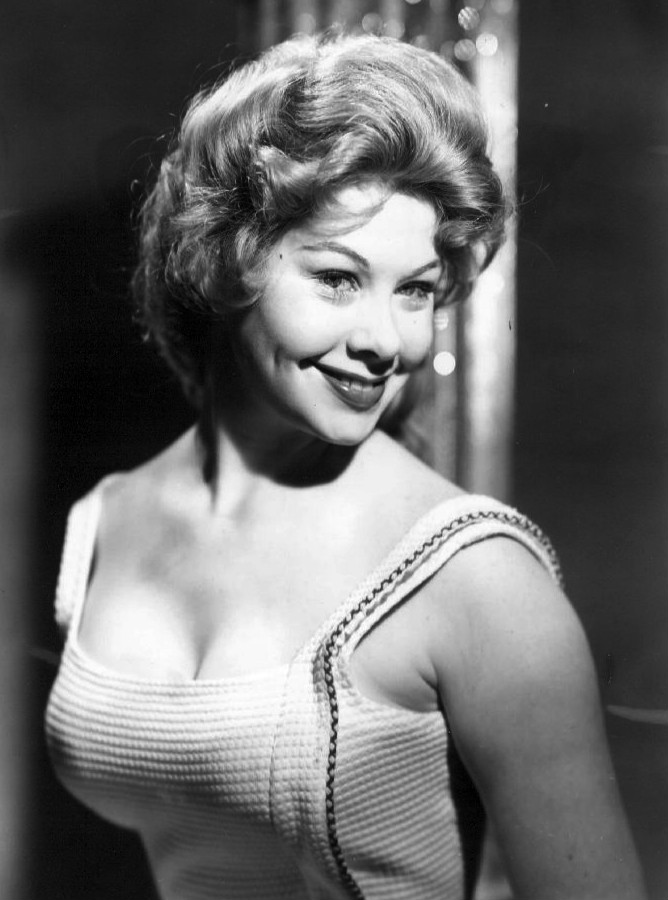
Sue Ane Langdon, Best Supporting Actress in a Series, Miniseries, or Television Film winner

=== Film ===
Best Motion Picture
| Drama | Comedy or Musical |
|---|---|
| The French Connection; A Clockwork Orange; The Last Picture Show; Mary, Queen of Scots; Summer of '42 | Fiddler on the Roof; The Boy Friend; Kotch; A New Leaf; Plaza Suite |
Best Performance in a Motion Picture – Drama
| Actor | Actress |
| Gene Hackman – The French Connection as Det. Jimmy "Popeye" Doyle; Peter Finch – Sunday Bloody Sunday as Daniel Hirsh; Malcolm McDowell – A Clockwork Orange as Alex DeLarge; Jack Nicholson – Carnal Knowledge as Jonathan Fuerst; George C. Scott – The Hospital as Dr. Herbert Bock | Jane Fonda – Klute as Bree Daniels; Dyan Cannon – Such Good Friends as Julie Messinger; Glenda Jackson – Mary, Queen of Scots as Queen Elizabeth I; Vanessa Redgrave – Mary, Queen of Scots as Mary, Queen of Scots; Jessica Walter – Play Misty for Me as Evelyn Draper |
Best Performance in a Motion Picture – Comedy or Musical
| Actor | Actress |
| Topol – Fiddler on the Roof as Tevye; Bud Cort – Harold and Maude as Harold Chasen; Dean Jones – The Million Dollar Duck as Professor Dooley; Walter Matthau – Kotch as Joseph P. Kotcher; Gene Wilder – Willy Wonka & the Chocolate Factory as Willy Wonka | Twiggy – The Boy Friend as Polly Browne; Sandy Duncan – Star Spangled Girl as Amy Cooper; Ruth Gordon – Harold and Maude as Maude Chardin; Angela Lansbury – Bedknobs and Broomsticks as Eglantine Price; Elaine May – A New Leaf as Henrietta Lowell |
Best Supporting Performance in a Motion Picture – Drama, Comedy or Musical
| Supporting Actor | Supporting Actress |
| Ben Johnson – The Last Picture Show as Sam the Lion; Tom Baker – Nicholas and Alexandra as Rasputin; Art Garfunkel – Carnal Knowledge as Sandy; Paul Mann – Fiddler on the Roof as Lazar Wolf; Jan-Michael Vincent – Going Home as Jimmy Graham | Ann-Margret – Carnal Knowledge as Bobbie; Ellen Burstyn – The Last Picture Show as Lois Farrow; Cloris Leachman – The Last Picture Show as Ruth Popper; Diana Rigg – The Hospital as Barbara Drummond; Maureen Stapleton – Plaza Suite as Karen Nash |
Other
| Best Director | Best Screenplay |
| William Friedkin – The French Connection; Peter Bogdanovich – The Last Picture Show; Norman Jewison – Fiddler on the Roof; Stanley Kubrick – A Clockwork Orange; Robert Mulligan – Summer of '42 | The Hospital – Paddy Chayefsky; The French Connection – Ernest Tidyman; Klute – Andy and Dave Lewis; Kotch – John Paxton; Mary, Queen of Scots – John Hale |
| Best Original Score | Best Original Song |
| Shaft – Isaac Hayes; The Andromeda Strain – Gil Mellé; Le Mans – Michel Legrand; Mary, Queen of Scots – John Barry; Summer of '42 – Michel Legrand | "Life Is What You Make It" (Marvin Hamlisch, Johnny Mercer) – Kotch; "Long Ago Tomorrow" (Burt Bacharach, Hal David) – The Raging Moon; "Rain Falls Anywhere It Wants To" (Laurence Rosenthal, Alan and Marilyn Bergman) – The African Elephant; "Something More" (Quincy Jones) – Honky; "Theme from Shaft" (Isaac Hayes) – Shaft |
| Best Foreign Film (English Language) | Best Foreign Film (Foreign Language) |
| Sunday Bloody Sunday (United Kingdom); The African Elephant (United Kingdom); Friends (United Kingdom); The Go-Between (United Kingdom); The Red Tent (Italy/USSR); The Raging Moon (United Kingdom) | The Policeman (Israel); Claire's Knee (France); The Conformist (Italy); Tchaikovsky (USSR); To Die of Love (France) |
| New Star of the Year – Actor | New Star of the Year – Actress |
| Desi Arnaz Jr. – Red Sky at Morning as William "Steenie" Stenopolous; Tom Baker – Nicholas and Alexandra as Rasputin; Timothy Bottoms – Johnny Got His Gun as Joe Bonham; Gary Grimes – Summer of '42 as Hermie; Richard Roundtree – Shaft as John Shaft; John Sarno – The Seven Minutes as Jerry Griffith | Twiggy – The Boy Friend as Polly Browne; Sandy Duncan – The Million Dollar Duck as Katie Dooley; Cybill Shepherd – The Last Picture Show as Jacy Farrow; Janet Suzman – Nicholas and Alexandra as Alexandra; Delores Taylor – Billy Jack as Jean Roberts |

The following films received multiple nominations:

| Nominations | Title |
|---|---|
| 6 | The Last Picture Show |
| 5 | Mary, Queen of Scots |
| 4 | Fiddler on the Roof |
| 4 | The French Connection |
| 4 | Kotch |
| 4 | Summer of '42 |
| 3 | The Boy Friend |
| 3 | Carnal Knowledge |
| 3 | A Clockwork Orange |
| 3 | The Hospital |
| 3 | Nicholas and Alexandra |
| 3 | Shaft |
| 2 | Harold and Maude |
| 2 | Klute |
| 2 | The Million Dollar Duck |
| 2 | A New Leaf |
| 2 | Plaza Suite |
| 2 | The Raging Moon |
| 2 | Sunday Bloody Sunday |

The following films received multiple wins:

| Wins | Title |
|---|---|
| 3 | The French Connection |
| 2 | The Boy Friend |
| 2 | Fiddler on the Roof |

=== Television ===
Best Television Series
| Drama | Musical or Comedy |
|---|---|
| Mannix: Marcus Welby, M.D.; Medical Center; The Mod Squad; O'Hara, U.S. Treasury | All in the Family: The Carol Burnett Show; The Flip Wilson Show; The Mary Tyler Moore Show; The Partridge Family |
Best Performance in a Television Series Drama
| Actor | Actress |
| Robert Young - Marcus Welby, M.D. as Dr. Marcus Welby: Raymond Burr - Ironside as Robert T. Ironside; Mike Connors - Mannix as Joe Mannix; William Conrad - Cannon as Frank Cannon; Peter Falk - Columbo as Lt. Columbo | Patricia Neal - The Homecoming: A Christmas Story as Olivia Walton: Lynda Day George - Mission: Impossible as Lisa Casey; Peggy Lipton - The Mod Squad as Julie Barnes; Denise Nicholas - Room 222 as Miss Liz McIntyre; Susan Saint James - McMillan & Wife as Sally McMillan |
Best Performance in a Television Series – Musical or Comedy
| Actor | Actress |
| Carroll O'Connor - All in the Family as Archie Bunker: Herschel Bernardi - Arnie as Arnie Nuvo; Jack Klugman - The Odd Couple as Oscar Madison; Dick Van Dyke - The New Dick Van Dyke Show as Dick Preston; Flip Wilson - The Flip Wilson Show as Various Characters | Carol Burnett - The Carol Burnett Show as Various Characters: Lucille Ball - Here's Lucy as Lucy Carter; Shirley Jones - The Partridge Family as Shirley Partridge; Mary Tyler Moore - The Mary Tyler Moore Show as Mary Richards; Jean Stapleton - All in the Family as Edith Bunker |
Best Supporting Performance in a Series, Miniseries or Television Film
| Supporting Actor | Supporting Actress |
| Ed Asner - The Mary Tyler Moore Show as Lou Grant: James Brolin - Marcus Welby, M.D. as Dr. Steven Kiley; Harvey Korman - The Carol Burnett Show as Various Characters; Rob Reiner - All in the Family as Michael Stivic; Milburn Stone - Gunsmoke as Dr. Galen "Doc" Adams | Sue Ane Langdon - Arnie as Lilian Nuvo: Amanda Blake - Gunsmoke as Miss Kitty Russell; Gail Fisher - Mannix as Peggy Fair; Sally Struthers - All in the Family as Gloria Stivic; Lily Tomlin - Rowan & Martin's Laugh-In as Various Characters |
Best Miniseries or Television Film
The Snow Goose: Brian's Song; Duel; The Homecoming: A Christmas Story; The Last Child

The following programs received multiple nominations:

| Nominations | Title |
|---|---|
| 5 | All in the Family |
| 3 | The Carol Burnett Show |
| 3 | Mannix |
| 3 | Marcus Welby, M.D. |
| 3 | The Mary Tyler Moore Show |
| 2 | Arnie |
| 2 | The Flip Wilson Show |
| 2 | Gunsmoke |
| 2 | The Homecoming: A Christmas Story |
| 2 | The Mod Squad |
| 2 | The Partridge Family |

The following programs received multiple wins:

| Wins | Title |
|---|---|
| 2 | All in the Family |

=== Cecil B. DeMille Award ===
Alfred Hitchcock
