= Thalia, Texas =

Unincorporated community in Texas, US

Thalia is an unincorporated community in Foard County in the northern part of the U.S. state of Texas. In 1990, the population was 104. Its name was given to the town portrayed in a number of Larry McMurtry's novels, including his first novel, Horseman, Pass By (1961). McMurtry's "Thalia" is widely considered to be modeled on his own North Texas hometown of Archer City, about 60 miles from Thalia.

== Geography ==
Thalia is located at 33°59′05″N 99°32′16″W.

== History ==
Thalia was founded in Hardeman County, and originally called "Paradise", but that name was rejected by the United States Postal Service, so it was renamed Thalia, meaning "blooming" or "luxuriant". The townsite was donated by William W. Pigg. A post office and school were opened in 1890. When Foard County was established in 1891, Thalia was located within the borders of the new county. Thalia was incorporated in 1926 with a population of 50. A high school was opened in 1930.

Thalia's economy benefited from the Texas oil boom of the 1920s, but later suffered from drought, the Great Depression, and a drop in oil production. The high school shut down in 1943, and the post office was closed by 1960. The population was recorded as 104 in 1980, down from 180 in 1950. In 2000, the population was again recorded as 104.

== Fiction ==
In addition to Horseman, Pass By, Larry McMurtry's novels Leaving Cheyenne (1963), The Last Picture Show (1966), Texasville (1987), Duane's Depressed (1999), and When the Light Goes (2007) are set in or around "Thalia". Hud, the film adaptation of Horseman, Pass By, was relocated from North Texas to the Texas Panhandle. The film adaptations of The Last Picture Show and Texasville take place in fictional Anarene, Texas.
