= 1971 New York Film Critics Circle Awards =

37th New York Film Critics Circle Awards

37th New York Film Critics Circle Awards

January 23, 1972

Best Picture:
A Clockwork Orange

The 37th New York Film Critics Circle Awards honored the best filmmaking of 1971. The winners were announced on 29 December 1971 and the awards were given on 23 January 1972.

== Winners ==
- Best Actor:
  - Gene Hackman - The French Connection
  - Runners-up: Peter Finch - Sunday Bloody Sunday and Malcolm McDowell - A Clockwork Orange
- Best Actress:
  - Jane Fonda - Klute
  - Runners-up: Gena Rowlands - Minnie and Moskowitz and Shirley MacLaine - Desperate Characters
- Best Director:
  - Stanley Kubrick - A Clockwork Orange
  - Runners-up: Peter Bogdanovich - The Last Picture Show and Bernardo Bertolucci - The Conformist (Il conformista)
- Best Film:
  - A Clockwork Orange
  - Runners-up: The Last Picture Show and The French Connection
- Best Screenplay (tie):
  - Peter Bogdanovich and Larry McMurtry - The Last Picture Show
  - Penelope Gilliatt - Sunday Bloody Sunday
  - Runner-up: Éric Rohmer - Claire's Knee (Le genou de Claire)
- Best Supporting Actor:
  - Ben Johnson - The Last Picture Show
  - Runners-up: Warren Oates - The Hired Hand and Two-Lane Blacktop and Alan Webb - King Lear
- Best Supporting Actress:
  - Ellen Burstyn - The Last Picture Show
  - Runners-up: Cloris Leachman - The Last Picture Show and Ann-Margret - Carnal Knowledge
