= The Stairs (1950 film) =

1950 film

- Directed by: Ben Maddow
- Written by: Ben Maddow
- Produced by: Helen Levitt
- Production companies: Film Documents, Inc. for the Mental Health Film Board and the South Carolina Department of Mental Health
- Distributed by: International Film Bureau
- Release date: 1950
- Running time: 25 minutes
- Country: United States
- Language: English

The Stairs (later renamed as The Steps of Age) is a 1950 American short documentary film. It focuses on a woman in her sixties who retires and goes to live with her daughter.

It was nominated for an Academy Award for Best Documentary Short.
