= Edmund Naughton =

American novelist

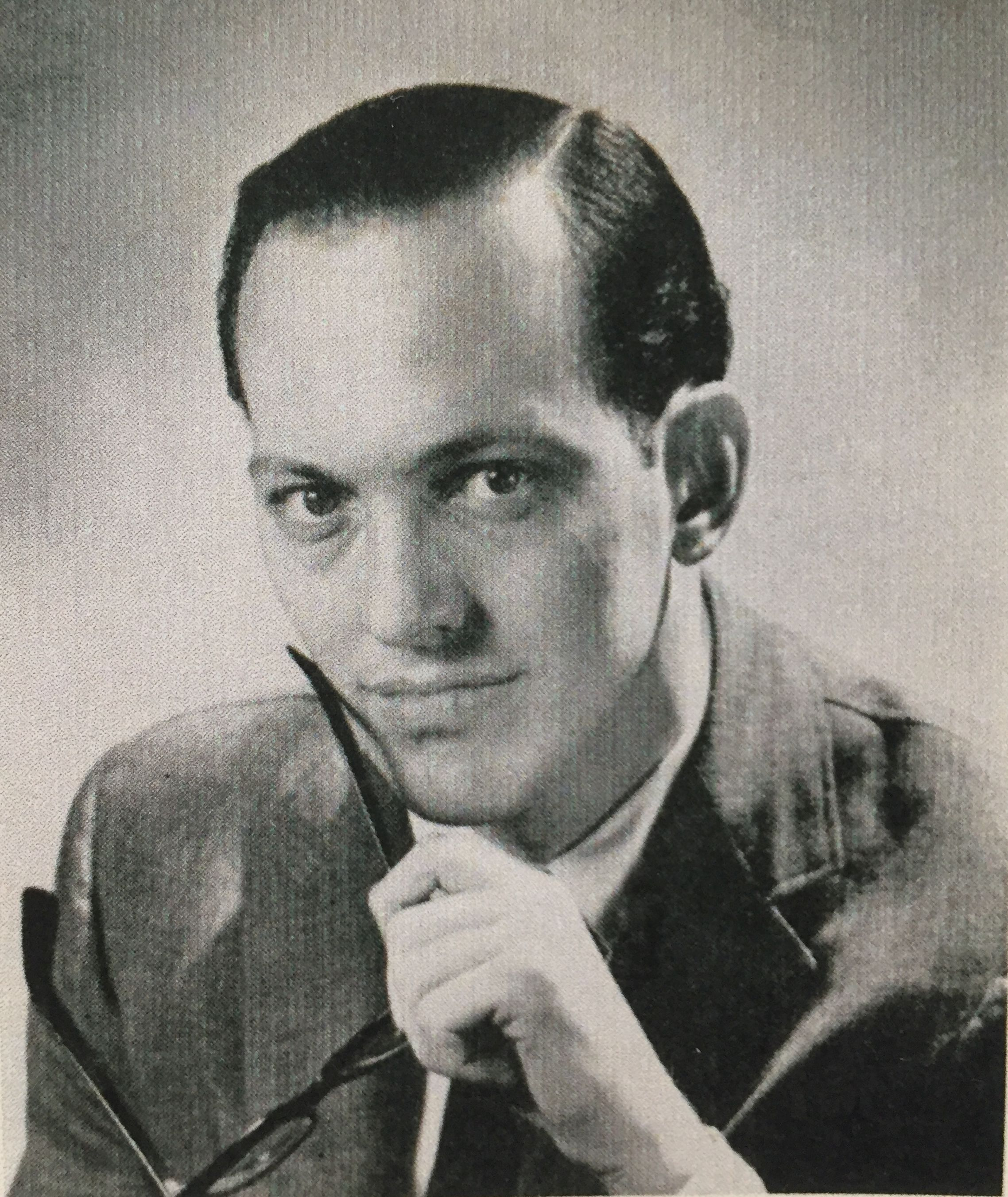
- Photograph from the dust jacket of McCabe (1959).
- Born: Edmund J. Naughton; March 7, 1926; New York City, New York, U.S.
- Died: September 9, 2013 (aged 87)
- Education: Boston College; Fordham University
- Occupations: Writer, journalist
- Years active: 1953–1984

Edmund J. Naughton (1926–2013) was an American writer and journalist, best known as an author crime and Western fiction. His 1959 debut novel McCabe was the basis for the 1971 film McCabe & Mrs. Miller, directed by Robert Altman.

== Life and career ==
Naughton was born and raised in New York City and educated in Catholic schools. He received a bachelor's degree from Boston College in 1948, and an M.F.A. degree from Fordham University in 1953. He became a police reporter for The Courier-Journal in Louisville, Kentucky. As described in a short biographical notice, "he stayed for 5 years on the police beat, which he worked down to an average of an hour & a half's work per day. The rest of the time he spent playing cards and drinking beer with policemen. Once he went on an actual manhunt with them. He wrote McCabe in 1957-1958, largely out of his experience on the police beat, transposing his characters to the West." In 1958 Naughton moved to Paris, France, where he worked for the International Herald Tribune, The New York Times, and as an English teacher.

McCabe, which had been well-reviewed by Nelson C. Nye in The New York Times, was translated into French as La Belle Main in 1960, and into German as Keine Chance für McCabe in 1966. He published his second novel, The Pardner, in 1971, which was also promptly translated into French (as Oh! collègue). In association with the 1971 film based on it, McCabe was published in new editions and a new translation into Italian (I Compari). The novel was last reprinted as a mass market paperback in 1992.

Naughton published four more novels. A Case in Madrid was published in 1973 and The Maximum Game in 1975. Two more novels appeared only in French translation: Les Cow-boys dehors! (1982 - Wild Horses) and Grand Noir et le petit Blanc (1984 - White Man, Black Man). French critic Claude Mesplède included Naughton in the Dictionnaire des littératures policières (lit. Dictionary of Crime Literature). Mesplède writes that Naughton lost his job as a journalist in Louisville following public revelations that he was homosexual, and that this episode motivated his emigration from the United States to Europe.

== Film adaptation of McCabe ==
The adaptation of Naughton's novel for the film McCabe & Mrs. Miller gave him wide recognition; the film is considered a masterpiece by prominent critics, and was entered into the U.S. National Film Registry in 2010. The story of the adaptation has been told by several film historians. The rights to McCabe were purchased in 1968 by producer David Foster through Naughton's agent in Paris, Ellen Wright.

Ben Maddow was hired to write a screenplay based on the novel, and there are two versions of his work in the archives of the Margaret Herrick Library. Maddow had made substantial changes to the plot of the novel. In October 1969 Robert Altman had been signed to direct a film adaptation of the novel. Brian McKay was hired to write a second, independent screenplay. A later "shooting screenplay" is available in archives. Only McKay and Altman were listed as screenwriters in the film's credits. Critic Matthew Dessem has compared the actual film with the Maddow and McKay screenplays and with Naughton's novel. Dessem concludes that the structure of the final film is reasonably faithful to Naughton's original novel.
