= The Hospital =

1971 absurdist satirical black comedy film directed by Arthur Hiller

- Theatrical release poster
- Directed by: Arthur Hiller
- Written by: Paddy Chayefsky
- Produced by: Howard Gottfried; Paddy Chayefsky
- Starring: George C. Scott; Diana Rigg
- Narrated by: Paddy Chayefsky
- Cinematography: Victor J. Kemper
- Edited by: Eric Albertson
- Music by: Morris Surdin
- Distributed by: United Artists
- Release date: December 14, 1971
- Running time: 103 minutes
- Country: United States
- Language: English
- Box office: $14.1 million $9 million (rentals)

The Hospital is a 1971 American absurdist satirical black comedy film directed by Arthur Hiller and starring George C. Scott as Dr. Herbert Bock. It was written by Paddy Chayefsky, who was awarded the 1972 Academy Award for Best Original Screenplay. Chayefsky also narrates the film and was one of the producers; he had complete control over the casting and content of the film.

In 1995, The Hospital was selected for preservation in the United States National Film Registry as being deemed "culturally, historically, or aesthetically significant".

== Plot ==
At a Manhattan teaching hospital, the life of Dr. Bock, the Chief of Medicine, is in disarray: he has left his wife, his children don't talk to him, and his once-beloved teaching hospital is falling apart.

The hospital is dealing with the sudden deaths of two doctors and a nurse. These are attributed to coincidental or unavoidable failures to provide accurate treatment.

At the same time, the teaching hospital's administrators must deal with a protest against the hospital's annexation of an adjacent and decrepit apartment building. The annexation is to be used for a drug rehabilitation center; the building's current occupants demand that the hospital find them replacement housing before the building is demolished despite the building being condemned sometime beforehand.

Dr. Bock admits to impotence and has thoughts of suicide, but falls in love with Barbara Drummond, a patient's daughter who came with her father from Mexico for his treatment. This temporarily gives Dr. Bock something to live for, after Barbara challenges and engages with him.

The deaths are discovered to have been caused by Barbara's father as retribution for the "inhumanity" of modern medical treatment. Mr. Drummond takes no personal responsibility, claiming his victims would have been saved if they had received prompt, appropriate treatment, but they didn't. Dr. Bock and Barbara use a final, accidental death of a doctor at the hospital to cover up Mr. Drummond's misdeeds. Barbara then makes plans to fly with her father back to Mexico. Dr. Bock at first intends to go with them, but at the last minute, driven by his sense of obligation, he insists on staying behind at the hospital so that it won't descend into total chaos.

== Cast ==
- George C. Scott as Dr. Herbert "Herb" Bock
- Diana Rigg as Miss Barbara Drummond
- Robert Walden as Dr. Brubaker
- Barnard Hughes as Edward Drummond (credited) and Dr. Mallory (uncredited)
- Richard A. Dysart as Dr. Welbeck
- Stephen Elliott as Dr. John Sundstrom
- Andrew Duncan as William "Willie" Mead
- Donald Harron as Milton Mead
- Nancy Marchand as Mrs. Christie, Head of Nurses
- Jordan Charney as Hitchcock, Hospital Administration
- Roberts Blossom as Guernsey
- Lenny Baker as Dr. Howard Schaefer
- Richard Hamilton as Dr. Ronald Casey
- Arthur Junaluska as Mr. Blacktree
- Kate Harrington as Nurse Dunne
- Katherine Helmond as Mrs. Marilyn Mead
- David Hooks as Dr. Joe Einhorn
- Frances Sternhagen as Mrs. Sally Cushing
- Tracey Walter as Man in Crowd (uncredited)
- Stockard Channing as E.R. Nurse (uncredited)
- Dennis Dugan as E.R. Doctor (uncredited)

== Production ==
It was filmed at Metropolitan Hospital Center in New York. Frank Thompson designed the costumes for the film.

== Reception ==
=== Box office ===
The film earned $9 million in North American rentals.

=== Critical response ===
When The Hospital was released, film critic Roger Ebert lauded the film, writing, "The Hospital is a better movie than you may have been led to believe. It has been criticized for switching tone in midstream, but maybe it's only heading for deeper, swifter waters. [...] Chayevsky's [sic] bizarre and unexpected ending suggests that men—even madmen—can still use institutions for their own private purpose."

Writing in The New York Times, Vincent Canby found the film “a very serious (in fact, perhaps, a little too serious), very funny melodramatic farce ... the writer’s intelligence, and his only recently exercised gift for fantasy ... save ‘The Hospital’ from a couple of serious seizures that, toward the end, overtake the movie when it feels called upon to certify its serious purposes and to straighten out its peculiar plot.”

More recently, film critic Dennis Schwartz gave the film a mildly positive review, writing, "The gallows humor was the melodramatic farce's saving grace; the film uses its razor-sharp instruments to cut into the hides of the insensitive institutionalized health care providers like Michael Moore's Sicko does in 2007 to the fat-cat HMOs. My major gripe was that it could have been better, as Chayefsky delivered his part of the bargain and so did Scott; nevertheless the pic flattens out as the director increasingly loses his way in all the bitterness and invented horror stories and leaves us dangling over how to get out of such an irredeemable world (where modern man is perceived as forgotten in death)." Pauline Kael wrote: "That great spangled ham George C. Scott in Paddy Chayefsky's farce about the killing incompetence in a modern big-city hospital. The picture strains for seriousness now and then, but even when it makes a fool of itself it's still funny."

The film has a 100% rating on Rotten Tomatoes, with an average rating of 7.8/10, based on 12 reviews.

=== Awards and nominations ===
Award	Category	Nominee(s)	Result	Ref.
Academy Awards	Best Actor	George C. Scott	Nominated	
Academy Awards	Best Story and Screenplay – Based on Factual Material or Material Not Previously Produced or Published	Paddy Chayefsky	Won	
Berlin International Film Festival	Golden Bear	Arthur Hiller	Nominated	
Berlin International Film Festival	Grand Jury Prize	Arthur Hiller	Won	
Berlin International Film Festival	Extraordinary Jury Prize	Arthur Hiller	Won	
British Academy Film Awards	Best Actor in a Leading Role	George C. Scott (also for They Might Be Giants)	Nominated	
British Academy Film Awards	Best Screenplay	Paddy Chayefsky	Won (Note: Tied with Larry McMurtry and Peter Bogdanovich for The Last Picture Show.)	
Golden Globe Awards	Best Actor in a Motion Picture – Drama	George C. Scott	Nominated	
Golden Globe Awards	Best Supporting Actress – Motion Picture	Diana Rigg	Nominated	
Golden Globe Awards	Best Screenplay – Motion Picture	Paddy Chayefsky	Won	
National Film Preservation Board	National Film Registry		Inducted	
Writers Guild of America Awards	Best Comedy – Written Directly for the Screen	Paddy Chayefsky	Won	

== See also ==
- List of American films of 1971
