= The Core =

2003 film by Jon Amiel

- Theatrical release poster
- Directed by: Jon Amiel
- Written by: Cooper Layne; John Rogers
- Produced by: David Foster; Cooper Layne; Sean Bailey
- Starring: Aaron Eckhart; Hilary Swank; Delroy Lindo; Stanley Tucci; D. J. Qualls; Richard Jenkins; Tcheky Karyo; Bruce Greenwood; Alfre Woodard
- Cinematography: John Lindley
- Edited by: Terry Rawlings
- Music by: Christopher Young
- Production companies: David Foster Productions; MFP Munich Film Partners
- Distributed by: Paramount Pictures
- Release date: March 28, 2003
- Running time: 135 minutes
- Country: United States
- Language: English
- Budget: $85 million
- Box office: $74.1 million

The Core is a 2003 American science fiction disaster film directed by Jon Amiel with screenplay written by Cooper Layne and John Rogers and starring Aaron Eckhart, Hilary Swank, Delroy Lindo, Stanley Tucci, D. J. Qualls, Richard Jenkins, Tcheky Karyo, Bruce Greenwood, and Alfre Woodard. The film focuses on a team of scientists whose mission is to drill to the center of the Earth and set off a series of nuclear explosions in order to restart the rotation of the Earth's core.

The film was released on March 28, 2003, by Paramount Pictures. It received mixed reviews from critics and grossed $74 million worldwide with a production budget of $85 million.

== Plot ==
After 32 mysterious deaths in Boston, a U.S. government investigation by Dr. Josh Keyes and Dr. Serge Leveque determines each victim died after electrical interference to their pacemakers. Other incidents involving the Earth's magnetic field lead Josh and Dr. Conrad Zimsky to conclude the Earth's inner core has stopped rotating.

To avoid exposure to devastating solar radiation, the U.S. government plans to detonate nuclear weapons within the Earth's outer core to restart the rotation. Zimsky's former partner, Dr. Ed "Braz" Brazzelton, builds a vessel, named Virgil, to deliver the bombs. NASA pilots Commander Robert Iverson and Major Rebecca Childs are enlisted to pilot Virgil and computer hacker Theodore Donald "Rat" Finch is recruited to avoid general panic by keeping news of further disasters and Virgil's mission off the internet.

Virgil is launched through the Marianas Trench and enters the crust using a laser-based drilling array. After entering the mantle, Virgil drills and falls into a gigantic empty geode, damaging the array. Iverson is killed freeing the vessel, but Virgil attempts to escape through a field of diamond formations where the compartment housing the weapons-control module is breached. Serge sacrifices himself to get the team the information and tools they need to detonate the nukes before the compartment is sealed and jettisoned.

The team finds the outer core much less dense than believed, making their nuclear payload insufficient for the mission. Zimsky reports to Lieutenant General Thomas Purcell and confesses his work on DESTINI, a U.S. tectonic weapon that likely stopped the core's rotation. Purcell orders them to return so DESTINI can be used to restart the core, but Josh convinces the team that DESTINI could permanently destabilize the core and trigger massive natural disasters. When a burst of microwave rays destroys the Golden Gate Bridge and causes power outages along the West Coast, Purcell orders DESTINI deployed before other power outages prevent it. Rat prevents Purcell from firing the weapon by redirecting its power.

The team plans to seal bombs inside Virgil's remaining compartments, jettison them, and stagger the detonations using constructive wave interference to increase the force of the bombs. Braz sacrifices himself to activate the jettison controls. The bomb in the second-to-last compartment falls on Zimsky's leg and he is unable to escape before the compartment is ejected. Josh uses the nuclear fuel rods from Virgil's reactor to provide additional energy for the final detonation. The bombs detonate, killing Zimsky in the powerless main compartment, but successfully restarts the core's rotation. Josh and Rebecca restore Virgil's power and escape the core, breaching the ocean floor near Hawaii. Purcell and the U.S. Navy conduct search operations, and Rat realizes the Virgil crew is using low-power ultrasound to draw whales to them so they can be located.

Rat uploads information about Virgil, its team, and DESTINI to the internet, leading to worldwide news reports and tributes to the lost team members.

== Cast ==
- Aaron Eckhart as Dr. Joshua "Josh" Keyes, a professor of geophysics at the University of Chicago who designs the navigation system for Virgil and is assigned as head of the project.
- Hilary Swank as Major Rebecca "Beck" Childs, USAF, an astronaut who distinguished herself during an emergency crash landing of the Space Shuttle Endeavour in Los Angeles, California, a result of the magnetic instability.
- Delroy Lindo as Dr. Edward "Braz" Brazzelton, the designer of Virgil and the ultrasonic lasers.
- Stanley Tucci as Dr. Conrad Zimsky, Earth specialist and designer of Project DESTINI, based in Alaska.
- Tcheky Karyo as Dr. Serge Leveque, nuclear weapons specialist, and colleague and friend of Dr. Keyes.
- Bruce Greenwood as Commander Robert "Bob" Iverson, USN, Major Childs' commander and mentor.
- D. J. Qualls as Theodore Donald "Rat" Finch, a computer hacker who is widely regarded as the best in the world, crippled the FBI's database, recruited to control the flow of information on the Internet to prevent public panic.
- Alfre Woodard as Dr. Talma "Stick" Stickley, the flight director for NASA Space Shuttle Endeavour and Virgil.
- Richard Jenkins as Lieutenant General Thomas Purcell, U.S. Army, leader of the operation.
- Fred Ewanuick as Endeavour Flight Engineer Jenkins

== Production ==
The Core began development in the late 1990s under producer David Foster for Paramount Pictures and was one of several Journey to the Center of the Earth inspired projects in development at the time along with Inner Earth at 20th Century Fox and a straight adaptation of the novel at Walt Disney Pictures. Initially Peter Hyams had been announced to be in final negotiations to direct. In September 2001, it was announced that Jon Amiel had signed on to direct. That same month, it was also announced that Aaron Eckhart had signed on to star in the film with co-star Hilary Swank joining the following month in October.

The Core had out-to-sea scenes, featuring the USS Abraham Lincoln (CVN-72), with full support of the US Navy.

The original plan for the shuttle landing scene had been for Endeavour to attempt a landing at Los Angeles International Airport (LAX) with the shuttle coming to a halt on the nearby beaches. However, due to changes in security-related protocols following the events of September 11, 2001, the crew was not allowed to film at LAX. The scene was therefore rewritten with Endeavour landing in the L.A. River.

== Release ==
The film was originally going to be released on November 1, 2002, but was delayed to March 28, 2003.

=== Box office ===
The film grossed $31.1 million in United States theaters, and another $43.0 million overseas for a total worldwide gross of $74.1 million against a production budget of $85 million.

=== Critical response ===
The Core garnered mixed reviews from critics. On the review aggregator website Rotten Tomatoes, 39% of 160 critics' reviews are positive, with an average rating of 5.3/10. The website's consensus reads: "A B-movie with its tongue planted firmly in cheek, The Core is so unintentionally (intentionally?) bad that it's a hoot." On Metacritic, another aggregation website, the film has a weighted average score of 48 out of 100 based on reviews from 32 critics, indicating "mixed or average reviews". Audiences polled by CinemaScore gave the film an average grade of "B" on an A+ to F scale.

In his review, Roger Ebert gave the film two and a half stars out of four and said "I have such an unreasonable affection for this movie, indeed, that it is only by slapping myself alongside the head and drinking black coffee that I can restrain myself from recommending it."

Several reviews cited the numerous scientific inaccuracies in the film. Elvis Mitchell of The New York Times said: "The brazen silliness of The Core is becalming and inauthentic, like taking a bath in nondairy coffee creamer. The Earth core's inability to turn is mirrored in the cast's inability to give the picture any spin." Kenneth Turan of the Los Angeles Times was a little more forgiving, saying: "If The Core finally has to be classified as a mess, it is an enjoyable one if you're in a throwback mood. After all, a film that comes up with a rare metal called unobtainium can't be dismissed out of hand."

In response to criticism of his screenplay's lack of scientific realism, screenwriter John Rogers responded that he tried to make the science accurate, but expended three years fighting "to get rid of the ... dinosaurs, magma-walks in 'space-suits', bullshit-sci-crap sources for the Earth's crisis, and a windshield for the ship Virgil."

On March 30, 2009, it was reported that Dustin Hoffman was leading a campaign to get more real science into science-fiction movies. Hoffman is on the advisory board of the Science & Entertainment Exchange, an initiative of the United States National Academy of Sciences, intended to foster collaborations between scientists and entertainment industry professionals in order to minimize inaccurate representations of science and technology such as those found in The Core.

In a poll of hundreds of scientists about bad science fiction films, The Core was voted the worst.

On February 21, 2010, The Guardian ran an article about American professor Sidney Perkowitz's proposals to curb bad science in science fiction movies. In the article, Perkowitz is said to have hated The Core. "If you violate [the coherent rules of science] you are in trouble. The chances are that the public will pick it up and that is what matters to Hollywood. The Core did not make money because people understood the science was so out to lunch".

== See also ==
- Crack in the World, 1965 film with a similar plot
- Deep Core, 2000 film with a similar plot
- Polar Storm, 2009 film with a similar plot
- Geostorm, 2017 film with a similar plot
- List of disaster films
