= 24th Directors Guild of America Awards =

- Date: March 18, 1972
- Location: The Beverly Hilton, Beverly Hills, California; Delmonico's, New York City
- Country: United States
- Presented by: Directors Guild of America
- Hosted by: Jack Lemmon

Highlights
- Best Director Feature Film: The French Connection – William Friedkin
- Website: https://www.dga.org/Awards/History/1970s/1971.aspx?value=1971

The 24th Directors Guild of America Awards, honoring the outstanding directorial achievements in film and television in 1971, were presented on March 18, 1972, at the Beverly Hilton in Beverly Hills, California and at Delmonico's in New York City. The ceremony was hosted by Jack Lemmon. The feature film nominees were announced in February 1972.

== Winners and nominees ==
=== Film ===
Feature Film

William Friedkin – The French Connection

- Peter Bogdanovich – The Last Picture Show
- Stanley Kubrick – A Clockwork Orange
- Robert Mulligan – Summer of '42
- John Schlesinger – Sunday Bloody Sunday

=== Television ===
Drama Series

Daniel Petrie – The Man and the City for "Hands of Love"

- Lewis Freedman –Hollywood Television Theater for Beginning to End
- Lamont Johnson – Hollywood Television Theater for Birdbath
Comedy Series

John Rich – All in the Family for "Meet the Bunkers"

- Bruce Bilson – The Odd Couple for "Being Divorced is Never Having to Say I Do"
- Jay Sandrich – Mary Tyler Moore for "Baby Sit-Com"
Movies for Television and Mini-Series

Buzz Kulik – Brian's Song

- Fielder Cook – The Price
- Delbert Mann – Jane Eyre
Musical Variety

Timothy Kiley – The Flip Wilson Show

- Arthur Fisher – The Sonny & Cher Comedy Hour
- Greg Garrison – The Dean Martin Show
Documentary/News

Phillip Beigel – Behind the Lines for Anatomy of a Decision: The FBI and the Great American Dream Machine

- Joel Banow – Louis Armstrong (CBS News special)
- Anthony Messuri – Apollo: A Trip to the Moon (NBC News special)

=== Outstanding Television Director ===
- John Rich
