= 1971 National Society of Film Critics Awards =

Annual US film award ceremony

6th NSFC Awards

December 24, 1971

Best Film:
Claire's Knee

The 6th National Society of Film Critics Awards, given on 24 December 1971, honored the best filmmaking of 1971.

== Winners ==
=== Best Picture ===
1. Claire's Knee (Le genou de Claire)
2. The Conformist (Il conformista)
3. A Clockwork Orange

=== Best Director ===
- Bernardo Bertolucci – The Conformist (Il conformista)

=== Best Actor ===
- Peter Finch – Sunday Bloody Sunday

=== Best Actress ===
- Jane Fonda – Klute

=== Best Supporting Actor ===
- Bruce Dern – Drive, He Said

=== Best Supporting Actress ===
- Ellen Burstyn – The Last Picture Show

=== Best Screenplay ===
- Penelope Gilliatt – Sunday Bloody Sunday

=== Best Cinematography ===
- Vittorio Storaro – The Conformist (Il conformista)

=== Special Award ===
- The Sorrow and the Pity (Le chagrin et la pitié)
