= Anarene, Texas =

Ghost town in Texas, United States

Anarene is a ghost town in Archer County, Texas, United States. Its name was used for the town portrayed in the film adaptation of Larry McMurtry's novel, The Last Picture Show.

== Geography ==
Anarene is located at 33°29′06″N 98°39′57″W.

== History ==
Anarene was founded on the Wichita Falls and Southern Railroad in 1908, the same year the Belknap Coal Company opened a coal mine in nearby Newcastle. It was named for Anna Laurene Graham, the daughter of pioneer settler J. M. Keen. Keen began ranching in the area after serving in the Confederate Army in the American Civil War.

Anarene's primary industry was the transportation of coal from the Newcastle mine. An oil field was discovered nearby in 1921. In 1929, Anarene had a population of 100, a store, a schoolhouse, a post office, a blacksmith shop, a filling station, and a two-story hotel. By 1933 the population had declined to 20. In 1942, coal production ended at the Newcastle mine. The Anarene railroad station closed in 1951, and the railway itself was abandoned in 1954. The same year marked the end of production at the Anarene oil field. The post office, established in 1909, was discontinued in 1955.

== Popular culture ==
The town portrayed in the 1971 film adaptation of The Last Picture Show is called "Anarene", although it is called "Thalia" in Larry McMurtry's novel. The film was actually made some 8 miles (13 km) to the north of Anarene, in McMurtry's hometown of Archer City, which is widely believed to have been the model for McMurtry's "Thalia". Director Peter Bogdanovich intended the film as an homage to Howard Hawks' Red River, set in Abilene, Kansas, and chose the name Anarene to evoke a correspondence. Anarene also appears in Bogdanovich's 1990 adaptation of McMurtry's sequel, Texasville.
