= Kotch =

1971 American film by Jack Lemmon

- Theatrical release poster
- Directed by: Jack Lemmon
- Screenplay by: John Paxton
- Based on: Kotch; 1965 novel by Katharine Topkins
- Produced by: Richard Carter
- Starring: Walter Matthau; Deborah Winters; Felicia Farr; Charles Aidman; Ellen Geer
- Cinematography: Richard H. Kline
- Edited by: Ralph E. Winters
- Music by: Marvin Hamlisch
- Production companies: Jalem Productions; Brier Productions; ABC Pictures
- Distributed by: Cinerama Releasing Corporation
- Release date: September 17, 1971
- Running time: 113 minutes
- Country: United States
- Language: English
- Budget: $1.5 million
- Box office: $5 million (rentals)

Kotch is a 1971 American comedy-drama film directed by Jack Lemmon and starring Walter Matthau, Deborah Winters, Felicia Farr (Lemmon's wife), Charles Aidman and Ellen Geer.

Adapted by John Paxton from Katharine Topkins's 1965 novel, the film tells the story of an elderly man who leaves his family rather than go to a nursing home, and strikes up a friendship with a pregnant teenage girl. It is Lemmon's only film behind the camera, and partnered him with friend and frequent co-star Matthau. It was also co-produced by Lemmon's company, Jalem Productions, in co-production with Paxton and Carter's company Brier Productions.

== Plot ==
In Los Angeles, young mother Wilma Kotcher hires Erica "Ricky" Herzenstiel to babysit her infant son Duncan. Wilma's father-in-law, nicknamed "Kotch", interrupts the arrangement with an unrelated and confusing story about another Herzenstiel. Erica takes Duncan to the park, but when her boyfriend arrives, she leaves Kotch behind. At the park, Kotch saves a young girl from drowning and, in an attempt to be friendly, gives her a pat on the back. The girl's mother and a Parks Department representative are offended, and Kotch's son Gerald is also displeased.

While Gerald and Wilma go out, Kotch discovers Erica and her boyfriend having sex in the living room. He quietly leaves and later discusses his frustrations with Gerald, questioning why he and Wilma do not trust him with Duncan. Kotch's complaints about Wilma taking tranquilizers lead her to insist that Gerald remove Kotch from their household. Gerald subsequently takes Kotch to an upscale retirement community, but Kotch is put off by the tests that he must take.

Kotch finds Erica at her high school, upset over her unplanned pregnancy and her decision to leave school for a job in San Bernardino. Despite her initial refusal, Erica accepts a small payment from Kotch, promising to repay it. Kotch subsequently travels across the country by bus, staying in motels and sending postcards to Duncan.

Returning unannounced to the Kotcher home, Kotch learns through a Halloween party letter that Erica cannot repay her debt due to serious issues. Acting as a private investigator, Kotch discovers that Erica was dismissed from her job as a hair stylist for being unlicensed and is now looking for work in Palm Springs. Kotch finds Erica, takes her on a tram ride, and offers her a job as his housekeeper. After spending autumn alone, Erica returns on Christmas Eve, ready to accept his offer.

In Palm Springs, Erica decorates and knits while Kotch buys an old car. Erica leaves a note saying that she is at a hospital, but Kotch finds out that she is attending a class on midwifery. When Erica decides to give up her baby for adoption, Kotch hires a nurse and tries to find a new family for Erica. However, Erica begins to have contractions and needs to be rushed to the hospital. Kotch ends up delivering the baby at a gas station.

Erica decides to keep her baby, and returns to Los Angeles. Gerald and Wilma offer a place to Kotch in their home, but he declines. Kotch instead plans to buy the Palm Springs house and work at a local hardware store. While cleaning up, Kotch finds a note indicating that he would have made a great-grandfather under better circumstances. He leaves with Pablo, ready for new adventures.

== Cast ==
- Walter Matthau as Joseph P. Kotcher
- Deborah Winters as Erica Herzenstiel
- Felicia Farr as Wilma Kotcher
- Charles Aidman as Gerald Kotcher
- Ellen Geer as Vera Kotcher
- Donald and Dean Kowalski as Duncan Kotcher
- Arlen Stuart as Mrs. Fisher
- Jane Connell as Miss Roberts
- James E. Brodhead as Mr. Weaver
- Jessica Rains as Dr. McKernan
- Darrell Larson as Vincent Perrin
- Biff Elliot as Motel Manager
- Paul Picerni as Dr. Ramon Caudillo
- Lucy Saroyan as Sissy
- Kim Hamilton as Emma Daly
- Amzie Strickland as Nurse Barons
- Larry Linville as Peter Stiel
- Penny Santon as Mrs. Segura
- Jack Lemmon as Sleeping Bus Passenger (uncredited)

== Production ==
Portions of the film were shot and set in Palm Springs, California.

== Reception ==
The film earned rentals of $3.6 million in North America, and $1.4 million in other countries. It recorded an overall profit of $330,000.

On Rotten Tomatoes, the film has an aggregate score of 75%, based on 6 positive and 2 negative reviews.

Roger Ebert of the Chicago Sun-Times gave the film two stars out of four. He wrote, "There aren't many comic actors I admire more than Matthau, and he does his best to be an old man in Kotch, but the illusion simply isn't there."

== Awards and nominations ==
Award	Category	Nominee(s)	Result	Ref.
Academy Awards	Best Actor	Walter Matthau	Nominated	
Academy Awards	Best Film Editing	Ralph E. Winters	Nominated	
Academy Awards	Best Song – Original for the Picture	"Life Is What You Make It"; Music by Marvin Hamlisch; Lyrics by Johnny Mercer	Nominated	
Academy Awards	Best Sound	Richard Portman and Jack Solomon	Nominated	
American Cinema Editors Awards	Best Edited Feature Film	Ralph E. Winters	Nominated	
Golden Globe Awards	Best Motion Picture – Musical or Comedy		Nominated	
Golden Globe Awards	Best Actor in a Motion Picture – Musical or Comedy	Walter Matthau	Nominated	
Golden Globe Awards	Best Screenplay – Motion Picture	John Paxton	Nominated	
Golden Globe Awards	Best Original Song – Motion Picture	"Life Is What You Make It"; Music by Marvin Hamlisch; Lyrics by Johnny Mercer	Won	
Kansas City Film Circle Critics Awards	Best Actor	Walter Matthau	Won (Note: Tied with Gene Hackman for The French Connection.)	
Writers Guild of America Awards	Best Comedy – Adapted from Another Medium	John Paxton	Won	

== Home media ==
Kotch was released on a Region 1 DVD by 20th Century Fox Home Entertainment July 6, 2004.

== See also ==
- List of American films of 1971
