= The Last Picture Show =

1971 film by Peter Bogdanovich

- Theatrical release poster by Richard Amsel
- Directed by: Peter Bogdanovich
- Screenplay by: Larry McMurtry; Peter Bogdanovich
- Based on: The Last Picture Show; 1966 novel by Larry McMurtry
- Produced by: Stephen J. Friedman
- Starring: Timothy Bottoms; Jeff Bridges; Ellen Burstyn; Ben Johnson; Cloris Leachman; Cybill Shepherd
- Cinematography: Robert Surtees
- Edited by: Donn Cambern; Peter Bogdanovich
- Color process: Black and white
- Production companies: Last Picture Show Productions; BBS Productions
- Distributed by: Columbia Pictures
- Release date: October 22, 1971
- Running time: 118 minutes
- Country: United States
- Language: English
- Budget: $1.3 million
- Box office: $29.1 million

The Last Picture Show is a 1971 American coming-of-age drama film directed by Peter Bogdanovich and co-written by Bogdanovich and Larry McMurtry, adapted from the 1966 semi-autobiographical novel by McMurtry. The film's ensemble cast includes Timothy Bottoms, Jeff Bridges, Ellen Burstyn, Ben Johnson, Cloris Leachman, Cybill Shepherd, Eileen Brennan, Sam Bottoms and Randy Quaid. Set in a small town in northern Texas from November 1951 to October 1952, it is a story of two high school seniors and longtime best friends, Sonny Crawford (Bottoms) and Duane Jackson (Bridges).

The Last Picture Show was theatrically released on October 22, 1971, by Columbia Pictures. It was a critical and commercial success, grossing $29 million on a $1.3 million budget, and was nominated for eight Academy Awards, including Best Picture, Best Director, Best Supporting Actor for Johnson and Bridges, and Best Supporting Actress for Burstyn and Leachman, with Johnson and Leachman winning.

Bogdanovich directed a 1990 sequel, Texasville, based on McMurtry's 1987 novel of the same name and featuring much of the original film's cast reprising their roles; Texasville failed to match the critical or commercial success of its predecessor. In 1998, the Library of Congress selected The Last Picture Show for preservation in the United States National Film Registry for being "culturally, historically or aesthetically significant".

== Plot ==
In 1951, Sonny Crawford and Duane Jackson are high school seniors and best friends in the small oil town of Anarene, Texas. Duane is dating Jacy Farrow, the most popular girl in town with the richest parents who disapprove of Duane's roughneck lifestyle. Sonny breaks up with his girlfriend Charlene due to his secret crush on Jacy.

At a Christmas dance, Jacy is invited by Lester Marlow to a skinny-dipping pool party at Bobby Sheen's, a wealthy young man and seemingly better prospect than Duane. At the dance, Sonny kisses Ruth Popper, the depressed middle-aged wife of his high school coach, and later sleeps with her.

Duane, Sonny and others take their young, mentally disabled friend, Billy, to a prostitute to lose his virginity. Returning him home, local businessman Sam "The Lion" is angered by their treatment of Billy, who habitually sweeps Anarene's main street. He forbids the group from entering any of his businesses, the only entertainment in town: the pool hall, movie theater, and café. Later, when Sam catches Sonny visiting Billy and Genevieve the waitress at the café, Sonny apologizes and Sam lifts the ban on him.

Bobby makes an advance on Jacy but refuses to have sex with her because she is a virgin. On New Year's Eve weekend, Duane and Sonny impulsively drive to Mexico. Before leaving, the nostalgic Sam gives them some extra money to enjoy themselves. When the boys return hungover and tired on Monday morning, they learn that Sam died suddenly of a stroke the day before. Sam leaves Sonny the pool hall in his will.

Jacy invites Duane to a motel room for sex, as she wants to be accepted into Bobby's libertine circle. He is unable to get an erection, so she scolds him. Later, they try again and Duane performs briefly, just enough for Jacy to lose her virginity. She breaks up with him by phone, hoping to become involved with Bobby.

However, Jacy learns that Bobby has already married another girl. Out of boredom and feeling rejected, she has sex with Abilene, her father Gene's drilling crew foreman and her mother's adulterer. When he drops Jacy off, he is brutally cold. Upon entering the house, Jacy's mother Lois catches her and Jacy begins to cry. They discuss.

Upset over the breakup, Duane enlists in the Army and is scheduled to serve in the Korean War after basic training. In his absence, Jacy goes for Sonny, who abruptly drops Ruth and dreams of marrying her. Duane returns home on leave, driving a new Mercury. He fights with Sonny over Jacy, smashing a beer bottle into Sonny's eye, sending him to the hospital. During his recovery, he refuses to see Ruth when she visits.

Jacy and Sonny elope to Oklahoma. While driving to their honeymoon, Jacy reveals that she left a letter to her parents, telling them of their entire plan. Jacy and Sonny are stopped by a state trooper who tells them to follow him. They meet the Farrows outside a police station. Gene angrily berates Sonny and drives Jacy home. Sonny rides back with Lois, who reveals that Sam was her first true love. She suggests that Sonny would be much better off with Ruth than with Jacy. The marriage is annulled and a short time passes.

On Duane's last night of leave, Sonny makes amends with him and reveals that Jacy has left for college in Dallas. They go to the theater on its final night. The last picture show is Red River.

The next morning, when Sonny sees Duane off, Duane asks Sonny to take care of his Mercury after Sonny admits that he and Jacy "never made it to the motel." As Sonny opens the pool hall, he hears brakes squealing outside. Billy is struck and killed by a truck while sweeping the road. The local townsmen surround Billy's body and coldly blame the dead boy for being stupid and careless. Grief-stricken, Sonny yells at them for their behavior and carefully carries Billy's body away, covering his face with his letterman jacket.

Angry and depressed with his life, Sonny drives to the city limits. He slowly changes his mind and returns, parking near Ruth's. He shyly asks to come in for a cup of coffee. Depressed, she has shuttered herself inside.

Ruth lets him in, then explodes in hurt and anger. She notices that Sonny is completely devastated. Demanding that he look at her, he does and gently touches her hand. Ruth's anger melts away and she comforts him. Her last words are “Never you mind, honey. Never you mind” as the film ends.

== Cast ==
- Timothy Bottoms as Sonny Crawford
- Jeff Bridges as Duane Jackson
- Cybill Shepherd as Jacy Farrow
- Ben Johnson as Sam the Lion
- Cloris Leachman as Ruth Popper
- Ellen Burstyn as Lois Farrow
- Eileen Brennan as Genevieve
- Clu Gulager as Abilene
- Sam Bottoms as Billy
- Randy Quaid as Lester Marlow
- Gary Brockette as Bobby Sheen
- Sharon Ullrick as Charlene Duggs (credited Sharon Taggart)
- Barc Doyle as Joe Bob Blanton
- Bill Thurman as Coach Popper
- Jessie Lee Fulton as Miss Mosey
- Joe Heathcock as the town's sheriff
- John Hillerman as the English teacher
- Robert Glenn as Gene Farrow
- Kimberly Hyde as Annie-Annie Martin
- Frank Marshall as Tommy Logan
- Janice O'Malley as Mrs. Clarg
- Helena Humann as Jimmie Sue
- Pamela Keller as Jackie Lee French
- Noble Willingham as Chester

== Production ==
Going into The Last Picture Show Peter Bogdanovich was a 31-year-old stage actor, film essayist, and critic. Bogdanovich had directed one film, Targets (also known as Before I Die), working with his wife and collaborator, Polly Platt. As Bogdanovich later explained to The Hollywood Reporter, while waiting in a cashier's line in a drugstore, he happened to look at the rack of paperbacks and his eye fell on an interesting title, The Last Picture Show. The back of the book said it was about "kids growing up in Texas" and Bogdanovich decided that it did not interest him and put it back. A few weeks later, actor Sal Mineo handed Platt a copy of the book. "I always wanted to be in this", he said, "but I'm a little too old now", said Mineo, who recommended that Platt and Bogdanovich make it into a film. According to Bogdanovich, Platt said, "I don't know how you make it into a picture, but it's a good book." According to Platt, at a dinner with her and Bogdanovich, producer Bert Schneider "asked Peter what he wanted to direct next, and Peter didn't really have an answer, but I piped up about this great book, The Last Picture Show, and Bert showed some interest." Platt contended that after Schneider agreed to fund the picture through BBS Productions, she convinced Bogdanovich to overcome his hesitations about the source material and commit to the project. Bogdanovich, McMurtry, and Platt adapted the novel into the film of the same name.

Stephen Friedman was a lawyer with Columbia Pictures but keen to break into film production as he had bought the film rights to the book, so Bogdanovich hired him as producer.

After discussing the proposed film with Orson Welles, his houseguest at the time, Bogdanovich agreed with him that shooting the film in black and white would work aesthetically, which by then was an unusual choice.

The film was shot in Larry McMurtry's small hometown of Archer City located in north-central Texas near the Oklahoma state line. McMurtry had renamed the town Thalia in his book; Bogdanovich dubbed it Anarene (for a ghost town eight miles (13 km) south of Archer City). The similarity to famed cowtown Abilene, Kansas, in Howard Hawks' Red River (1948) was intentional. Red River again is tied in as "the last picture show", which Sonny and Duane watch at the end of the film.

After shooting wrapped, Bogdanovich went back to Los Angeles to edit the film footage on a Moviola. Bogdanovich has said that he edited the entire film himself, but refused to credit himself as editor, reasoning that director and co-writer were enough. When informed that the Motion Picture Editors Guild required an editor credit, he suggested Donn Cambern, who had been editing another film, Drive, He Said (1971), in the next office and had helped Bogdanovich with some purchasing paperwork concerning the film's opticals. Cambern disputes this, stating that Bogdanovich did do an edit of the film, which he screened for a selection of guests, including Jack Nicholson, Bob Rafelson and himself. The consensus was the film was going to be great, but needed further editing to achieve its full potential. Cambern claims Bogdanovich invited him to do so, during which he made significant contributions to the film's final form.

Bogdanovich obtained a rare waiver from the Directors Guild of America to have his name appear only at the end of the film, only after the actors' credits, as he felt it was more meaningful for the audience to see their names after their performances.

=== Music ===
The film features entirely diegetic music, including many songs of Hank Williams Sr. and other country and western and 1950s popular music recording artists. In interviews, Bogdanovich emphasized that a lot of attention was paid to the music being accurate and contemporary to the narrated time span between November 1951 to October 1952, and that no songs were used that were released later than that.

== Reception and legacy ==
=== Box office ===
The film earned $13.1 million in domestic rentals in North America.

=== Critical reception ===
Chicago Sun-Times critic Roger Ebert gave the film four out of four stars in his original review and named it the best film of 1971. He later added it to his "Great Movies" list, writing that "the film is above all an evocation of mood. It is about a town with no reason to exist, and people with no reason to live there. The only hope is in transgression." Vincent Canby of The New York Times called it a "lovely film" that "rediscovers a time, a place, a film form—and a small but important part of the American experience." Gene Siskel of the Chicago Tribune gave the film four stars out of four and wrote: "Like few films in recent years, Peter Bogdanovich's The Last Picture Show ends with us wanting to see more of the people who occupy the small town world that is Anarene, Tex. in 1951. This emotion is not easily achieved. It is a result of a thoro [sic] Peyton Place investigation into Anarene's bedrooms, parked cars, football games, movie theater, restaurant, and pool hall." Charles Champlin of the Los Angeles Times called the film "the most considered, craftsmanlike and elaborate tribute we have yet had to what the movies were and how they figured in our lives." Gary Arnold of The Washington Post called it "an exceedingly well-made and involving narrative film with decent aims, encouraging us to understand and care about its characters, though not to emulate them."

On the review aggregation website Rotten Tomatoes, the film holds an approval rating of 98% based on 115 reviews, with an average rating of 9.2/10. The site's critics consensus reads: "Making excellent use of its period and setting, Peter Bogdanovich's small town coming-of-age story is a sad but moving classic filled with impressive performances." According to Metacritic, which assigned a weighted average score of 93 out of 100 based on 15 critics, the film received "universal acclaim".

=== Legacy ===
The film and its poster are referenced in the title of the 1975 album The Last Record Album by American rock band Little Feat and in the cover illustration by Neon Park.

Irish musician CMAT addressed the breakdown of Bogdanovich's marriage with his wife and collaborator Polly Platt after deciding to leave her for lead actress Cybill Shepard, which occurred during the production of The Last Picture Show, in the song "Peter Bogdanovich", which was released as part of her 2022 debut album If My Wife New I'd Be Dead.

2024 graphic novel The Final Cut by American cartoonist Charles Burns includes illustrations of shots from the pool party scene.

=== Awards and nominations ===
Award	Category	Nominee(s)	Result	Ref.
Academy Awards	Best Picture	Stephen J. Friedman	Nominated	
Academy Awards	Best Director	Peter Bogdanovich	Nominated	
Academy Awards	Best Supporting Actor	Jeff Bridges	Nominated	
Academy Awards	Best Supporting Actor	Ben Johnson	Won	
Academy Awards	Best Supporting Actress	Ellen Burstyn	Nominated	
Academy Awards	Best Supporting Actress	Cloris Leachman	Won	
Academy Awards	Best Screenplay – Based on Material from Another Medium	Larry McMurtry and Peter Bogdanovich	Nominated	
Academy Awards	Best Cinematography	Robert Surtees	Nominated	
British Academy Film Awards	Best Film		Nominated	
British Academy Film Awards	Best Direction	Peter Bogdanovich	Nominated	
British Academy Film Awards	Best Actor in a Supporting Role	Ben Johnson	Won	
British Academy Film Awards	Best Actress in a Supporting Role	Eileen Brennan	Nominated	
British Academy Film Awards	Best Actress in a Supporting Role	Cloris Leachman	Won	
British Academy Film Awards	Best Screenplay	Larry McMurtry and Peter Bogdanovich	Won (Note: Tied with Paddy Chayefsky for The Hospital.)	
Directors Guild of America Awards	Outstanding Directorial Achievement in Motion Pictures	Peter Bogdanovich	Nominated	
Golden Globe Awards	Best Motion Picture – Drama		Nominated	
Golden Globe Awards	Best Director – Motion Picture	Peter Bogdanovich	Nominated	
Golden Globe Awards	Best Supporting Actor – Motion Picture	Ben Johnson	Won	
Golden Globe Awards	Best Supporting Actress – Motion Picture	Ellen Burstyn	Nominated	
Golden Globe Awards	Best Supporting Actress – Motion Picture	Cloris Leachman	Nominated	
Golden Globe Awards	New Star of the Year – Actress	Cybill Shepherd	Nominated	
Kansas City Film Critics Circle Awards	Best Supporting Actress	Cloris Leachman	Won	
Kinema Junpo Awards	Best Foreign Language Film	Peter Bogdanovich	Won	
National Board of Review Awards	Top Ten Films		5th Place	
National Board of Review Awards	Best Supporting Actor	Ben Johnson	Won	
National Board of Review Awards	Best Supporting Actress	Cloris Leachman	Won	
National Film Preservation Board	National Film Registry		Inducted	
National Society of Film Critics Awards	Best Supporting Actor	Ben Johnson	Nominated	
National Society of Film Critics Awards	Best Supporting Actress	Ellen Burstyn	Won	
National Society of Film Critics Awards	Best Supporting Actress	Cloris Leachman	Nominated	
New York Film Critics Circle Awards	Best Film		Nominated	
New York Film Critics Circle Awards	Best Director	Peter Bogdanovich	Nominated	
New York Film Critics Circle Awards	Best Supporting Actor	Ben Johnson	Won	
New York Film Critics Circle Awards	Best Supporting Actress	Ellen Burstyn	Won	
New York Film Critics Circle Awards	Best Supporting Actress	Cloris Leachman	Runner-up	
New York Film Critics Circle Awards	Best Screenplay	Larry McMurtry and Peter Bogdanovich	Won (Note: Tied with Penelope Gilliatt for Sunday Bloody Sunday.)	
Online Film & Television Association Awards	Film Hall of Fame: Productions		Inducted	
São Paulo Association of Art Critics Awards	Best Foreign Film	Peter Bogdanovich	Won	
Texas Film Awards	Frontier Award	Cybill Shepherd	Won	
Writers Guild of America Awards	Best Drama – Adapted from Another Medium	Larry McMurtry and Peter Bogdanovich	Nominated	

It ranked No. 19 on Entertainment Weekly's list of the 50 Best High School Movies. In 2007, the film was ranked No. 95 on the American Film Institute's 10th Anniversary Edition of the 100 greatest American films of all time.

In April 2011, The Last Picture Show was re-released in UK and Irish cinemas, distributed by Park Circus. Total Film magazine gave the film a five-star review, stating: "Peter Bogdanovich's desolate Texan drama is still as stunning now as it was in 1971."

The February 2020 issue of New York Magazine lists The Last Picture Show as among "The Best Movies That Lost Best Picture at the Oscars."

=== Home media ===
The film was released by The Criterion Collection in November 2010 as part of its box set America Lost and Found: The BBS Story. It included a high-definition digital transfer of Peter Bogdanovich's director's cut, two audio commentaries, one from 1991, featuring Bogdanovich and actors Cybill Shepherd, Randy Quaid, Cloris Leachman, and Frank Marshall; the other from 2009, featuring Bogdanovich "The Last Picture Show": A Look Back, (1999) and Picture This (1990), documentaries about the making of the film, A Discussion with Filmmaker Peter Bogdanovich, a 2009 Q&A, screen tests and location footage, and excerpts from a 1972 television interview with director François Truffaut about the New Hollywood.

== Director's cut ==
Bogdanovich re-edited the film in 1992 to create a "director's cut". This version restores seven minutes of footage that Bogdanovich trimmed from the 1971 release because Columbia had imposed a firm 119-minute limit. With this requirement removed in the 1990s, Bogdanovich used the 127-minute cut on LaserDisc, VHS and DVD releases. The original 1971 cut was never released on DVD or Blu-ray for years, though it was released on VHS and LaserDisc through Columbia Tristar Home Video. However, the theatrical cut, along with the more known director's cut, was included as a part of Sony's Columbia Classics Volume 3 4K Blu-ray box set.

There are two substantial scenes restored in the director's cut. The first is a sex scene between Jacy and Abilene that plays in the poolhall after it has closed for the night; it precedes the exterior scene where he drops her off home and she says "What a night. I never thought this would happen." The other major insertion is a scene that plays in Sam's café, where Genevieve watches while an amiable Sonny and a revved-up Duane decide to take their road trip to Mexico; it precedes the exterior scene outside the pool hall when they tell Sam of their plans, the last time they will ever see him.

Several shorter scenes were also restored. One comes between basketball practice in the gym and the exterior at The Rig-Wam drive-in; it has Jacy, Duane and Sonny riding along in her convertible (and being chased by an enthusiastic little dog), singing an uptempo rendition of the more solemn school song sung later at the football game. Another finds Sonny cruising the town streets in the pick-up, gazing longingly into Sam's poolhall, café and theater, from which he has been banished. Finally, there is an exterior scene of the auto caravan on its way to the Senior Picnic; as it passes the fishing tank where he had fished with Sam and Billy, Sonny sheds a tear for his departed friend and his lost youth.

Two scenes got slightly longer treatments: Ruth's and Sonny's return from the doctor, and the boys' returning Billy to Sam after his encounter with Jemmie Sue—both had added dialogue. Also, a number of individual shots were put back in, most notably a Gregg Toland-style deep focus shot in front of the Royal Theatre as everyone gets into their cars.

== Sequel ==
Texasville, the 1990 sequel to The Last Picture Show, based on McMurtry's 1987 novel of the same name, was also directed by Bogdanovich, from his own screenplay, without McMurtry this time. The film reunites actors Jeff Bridges, Cybill Shepherd, Timothy Bottoms, Cloris Leachman, Eileen Brennan, Randy Quaid, Sharon Ullrick (née Taggart) and Barc Doyle.
