= Ben Maddow =

American screenwriter, documentarian, and poet (1909–1992)

- Born: Benjamin David Maddow; August 7, 1909; Passaic, New Jersey, U.S.
- Died: October 9, 1992 (aged 83); Los Angeles, California, U.S.
- Education: Columbia University
- Occupations: Screenwriter, poet, short story author, film director
- Spouse: Freda Flier (m. 1944)
- Children: 2
- Writing career
- Pen name: David Wolff

Benjamin David Maddow (August 7, 1909 – October 9, 1992) was an American screenwriter, documentarian, and poet, whose career spanned the 1930s to 1970s. He was nominated for an Academy Award for Best Adapted Screenplay for his work on The Asphalt Jungle (1950), and shared a BAFTA Award for Best Documentary for co-directing the documentary The Savage Eye (1960).

He sometimes used the pen name David Wolff.

== Early life and education ==
Maddow was born in 1909 in Passaic, New Jersey to Russian-Jewish immigrant parents. He graduated in 1930 with a degree in biophysics from Columbia University, but with the onset of the Great Depression he was unemployed for two years. He eventually found work as an orderly at Bellevue Hospital. He then got a job with New York City's Emergency Relief Bureau as a social welfare investigator. He was also writing poetry (which he had started doing at Columbia) under the pseudonym 'David Wolff'. In January 1940, his poem "The City" won the Harriet Monroe Memorial Prize, worth $100.

== Film career ==
Maddow's film career began when he answered an ad to write commentary for a short documentary, Harbor Scenes (1935), being made by photographer Ralph Steiner. Maddow was impressed with the power of the film medium. He partnered with Leo Hurwitz and others to form NYKino, an independent company devoted to making socially conscious films. In 1936, NYKino initiated a left-wing newsreel series, The World Today. It was patterned after The March of Time and produced two episodes, "Sunnyside" and "The Black Legion". In March 1937, NYKino was renamed Frontier Films. Maddow co-wrote, either using his own name or "David Wolff", the Frontier-made documentaries People of the Cumberland (1937), Heart of Spain (1937), China Strikes Back (1937), and United Action Means Victory (1939). The company's most successful effort was the 1942 documentary feature, Native Land, narrated by Paul Robeson and co-written by Maddow, Hurwitz, and Paul Strand.

During World War II, Maddow served in the U.S. Army's First Motion Picture Unit. After the war, he obtained work in Hollywood as a screenwriter. His first feature film credit was Framed (1947). After co-writing The Man from Colorado (1948), he and fellow leftist Walter Bernstein adapted Gerald Butler's novel Kiss the Blood Off My Hands into a noir-thriller of the same title. In his next assignment, Maddow undertook the task of adapting William Faulkner's Intruder in the Dust, with its complex narrative structure, into an accessible screen drama. The resulting film, directed by Clarence Brown, is regarded as one of the better Faulkner adaptations.

Maddow's most notable achievement was to adapt, with writer-director John Huston, W. R. Burnett's 1949 crime novel The Asphalt Jungle into the critically acclaimed 1950 film. For their work, Maddow and Huston received an Oscar nomination for Best Adapted Screenplay, among other accolades.

Maddow continued his interest in the documentary genre; he wrote and directed The Stairs (1950), which was commissioned by the National Bureau of Mental Health.

=== Hollywood Blacklist ===
Maddow was working on scripts for two films destined to become classics, High Noon (1952) and The Wild One (1953), when he was informed he had been fired from both projects. He figured that he was being blacklisted for his left-wing documentaries from the 1930s. In early 1953 he was named as a Communist to the House Un-American Activities Committee (HUAC) by the wife of screenwriter Leo Townsend. Maddow was subpoenaed by the HUAC and testified on March 28, 1953. He invoked both the First Amendment and Fifth Amendment rather than answer the committee's question about whether he was a member of the Communist Party.

While blacklisted he wrote for several years under pseudonyms and "fronts". He contributed to Johnny Guitar (1954), credited to Philip Yordan. Maddow also used Yordan as a front for Men in War (1957) and God's Little Acre (1958), an adaptation of the Erskine Caldwell novel.

In a controversial move that cost him friendships, Maddow decided in 1958 to cooperate with the HUAC and name names, including his former documentary partner Leo Hurwitz. Maddow explained this decision, which ended his blacklisting, in a 1989 interview with Patrick McGilligan.

=== After the blacklist ===
In 1959, Maddow made The Savage Eye, "a dramatized documentary look at the seedy side of Los Angeles". It won the BAFTA Flaherty Documentary Award. He and John Huston teamed up again to work on The Unforgiven. They co-wrote the episode "The Professor" for the 1961 TV series The Asphalt Jungle. Two years later, Maddow directed his first feature film, the offbeat drama An Affair of the Skin. He was employed steadily as a writer in the 1960s: he adapted the Jean Genet play The Balcony for the 1963 film; he co-wrote the screenplays for The Way West (1967) and The Secret of Santa Vittoria (1969); and he contributed scripts to TV series such as The Untouchables, Naked City, Arrest and Trial, and Kraft Suspense Theatre.

In 1968, Maddow drafted a screenplay of Edmund Naughton's novel McCabe; however, Maddow's approach to adapting the novel was mostly jettisoned, and he was not credited on the 1971 film, McCabe & Mrs. Miller. His final credited film effort was the screenplay for The Mephisto Waltz (1970). He directed the award-winning documentary, A Storm of Strangers in 1969. He also wrote the TV movie Man on a String, which aired in 1972.

In a 1971 interview with Richard Corliss, Maddow wryly commented on the challenges of adapting novels to the screen: "[I]f the novel is bad, the film has a decent chance to be good. If the novel is fairly good, the film is generally not bad at all. But if the novel is great, the film, paralyzed with admiration, is quite hopeless."

== Other writings ==
Maddow also wrote short fiction. His story, "In a Cold Hotel", was one of the O. Henry Award winners of 1963. His only novel, 44 Gravel Street, was published in 1959.

After retiring from screenwriting, Maddow pursued various non-fiction projects. He researched and wrote illustrated biographies of photographers Edward Weston and W. Eugene Smith. The Weston work was nominated for a National Book Award in 1974.

== Death ==
On October 9, 1992, Ben Maddow died of congestive heart failure at the Hollywood Presbyterian Medical Center. He was 83.
