= David Foster (film producer) =

American film producer (1929–2019)

- Born: 1929; The Bronx, New York City, U.S.
- Died: December 23, 2019 (aged 90); Los Angeles, California, U.S.
- Occupation: Film producer
- Spouse: Jackie Pattiz
- Children: 3 sons

David Foster (1929 – December 23, 2019) was an American film producer, with credits in films such as The Thing (1982), The Mask of Zorro (1998) and The Core (2003).

== Early life ==
Foster was born in 1929 in The Bronx, New York City. His parents were Jewish immigrants from Poland. He moved to California in 1946 at age 17, and graduated from USC School of Cinema - Television in 1953.

== Career ==
=== Early career ===
Foster began his career as a publicist for Rogers & Cowan, representing top tier talent including Steve McQueen, Shirley MacLaine, Peter Sellers and Sonny and Cher. He then became a partner at Allan, Foster, Ingersoll and Weber. He produced his first film, McCabe & Mrs. Miller, in 1971.

== Personal life and death ==
Foster married Jackie Pattiz in 1959, and they had three sons: Gary, Greg, and Tim. Gary followed in his father's footsteps, producing the TV series Community. Tim also produced two films in the late 1990s, and Greg was the former CEO of IMAX.

David Foster died on December 23, 2019, in Los Angeles, California, at age 90.

== Filmography ==
He was producer for all films unless otherwise noted.

=== Film ===
Year	Film	Credit	Notes
1971	McCabe & Mrs. Miller		
1972	The Getaway		
1974	The Nickel Ride	Executive producer	
1975	The Drowning Pool		
1977	First Love		
1977	Heroes		
1978	The Legacy		
1981	Caveman		
1982	The Thing		
1983	Second Thoughts		
1984	Mass Appeal		
1985	The Mean Season		
1986	Short Circuit		
1986	Running Scared		
1988	Short Circuit 2		
1988	Full Moon in Blue Water		
1989	Gleaming the Cube		
1994	The Getaway		
1994	The River Wild		
1998	The Mask of Zorro		
1999	Clubland	Executive producer	
2002	Collateral Damage		
2002	Hart's War		
2003	The Core		
2005	The Fog		
2011	The Thing	Executive producer	Final film as a producer

Miscellaneous crew

Year	Film	Role	Notes
1980	Tribute	Presenter	
1982	The Thing	Photographic model: Norwegian crew	Uncredited

Thanks

Year	Film	Role
1997	8 Heads in a Duffel Bag	The producers and director wish to thank

=== Television ===
Year	Title	Credit	Notes
1982	Between Two Brothers	Executive producer	Television film
1982	The Gift of Life	Executive producer	Television film
1985	Murphy's Mob		
1986	News at Eleven	Executive producer	Television film
