= Katharine Topkins =

American novelist

- Born: July 22, 1927 (age 99); Seattle, Washington, US
- Occupation: Writer
- Spouse: Richard Topkins
- Writing career
- Genre: Fiction

Katharine Topkins (born July 22, 1927) is an American novelist, short story writer, and recipient of the 1966 Grant for Creative Writing from the Rockefeller Foundation. She has published five novels and several short stories.

She graduated from Columbia University School of General Studies with a B.S. in 1949, and from Claremont Graduate University with an M.A. in 1951. She married Richard Topkins in 1954, with whom she had three children.

She currently lives in Marin, California.

== Adaptations ==
A film adaptation of her novel, Kotch, was released on September 17, 1971. Jack Lemmon directed the film, Kotch, starring Walter Matthau, Deborah Winters, Felicia Farr, Charles Aidman, and Ellen Geer.

In 1996, the Griffin Theatre Company premiered a theatrical adaptation of her novel Riding the Dolphin.

== Published works ==
=== Novels ===
- All the Tea in China, Macmillan, 1962. LCCN 62019432
- Kotch, McGraw-Hill, 1965. LCCN 64007872
- Passing Go, Little Brown, with Richard Topkins, 1965. LCCN 68024235
- Ill Boom, Random House, with Richard Topkins, 1974. ISBN 0394487915
- Riding the Dolphin, Beaufort, 1987. ISBN 978-0825304279 (published as Amanda Thomas)

=== Short stories ===
- "Dearly Beloved", The New Yorker, March 22, 1958 P. 124
- “Forsaking All Others”, Accent, summer, 1960
- “Vista del Sol”, The Minnesota Review, winter, 1961
- “Repeat the Sounding Joy”, Epoch, spring, 1961
- “The Visitation”, The Minnesota Review, 1961
- “Car Pool”, Epoch, spring, 1962
- “The Family Way”, Prairie Schooner, fall, 1961
- “Free and Accepted”, Genesis West, winter, 1963
- “Dun Rovin”, Claremont Quarterly, winter, 1963
- “Janetta”, The University Review, University of Missouri, Dec, 1964
