= Sunday Bloody Sunday (film) =

1971 British drama film by John Schlesinger

- Theatrical release poster
- Directed by: John Schlesinger
- Written by: Penelope Gilliatt; David Sherwin; John Schlesinger (Note: Sherwin and Schlesinger are both uncredited)
- Produced by: Joseph Janni; Edward Joseph
- Starring: Glenda Jackson; Peter Finch; Murray Head; Peggy Ashcroft
- Cinematography: Billy Williams
- Edited by: Richard Marden
- Music by: Ron Geesin
- Production company: Vectia
- Distributed by: United Artists
- Release date: 1 July 1971 (Premiere)
- Running time: 110 minutes
- Country: United Kingdom
- Language: English
- Budget: £1.5 million

Sunday Bloody Sunday is a 1971 British drama film directed by John Schlesinger, written by Penelope Gilliatt, and starring Glenda Jackson, Peter Finch, Murray Head and Peggy Ashcroft. It tells the story of a free-spirited young bisexual artist (played by Head) and his simultaneous relationships with a divorced recruitment consultant (Jackson) and a gay Jewish doctor (Finch).

Although a box office failure in many regions of the United States, the film received critical acclaim upon release, with major praise drawn towards Schlesinger's direction, performances of the cast (particularly of Finch and Jackson), and its screenplay. The film garnered significant praise for its positive depiction of homosexuality, marking a considerable departure from Schlesinger's previous film Midnight Cowboy (1969), which portrayed gay men as alienated and self-loathing beings, as well as other gay-themed films of the era, including The Boys in the Band (1970) and Some of My Best Friends Are... (1971).

The film received numerous accolades. At the 25th British Academy Film Awards, the film received eight nominations, winning a leading five awards, including for the Best Film. It received four nominations at the 44th Academy Awards: Best Director, Best Actor (for Finch), Best Actress (for Jackson), and Best Original Screenplay.

== Plot ==
In London, a middle-aged gay Jewish doctor, Daniel Hirsh, and a divorced woman in her mid-30s, Alex Greville, are both involved in an open love triangle with sculptor Bob Elkin, a younger man in his mid-20s. Not only are Daniel and Alex each aware that Bob is seeing the other but they know one another through mutual friends. Despite this, they are willing to put up with the situation through fear of losing Bob, who switches freely between them. Bob has his own coterie of artist friends who support his work, which consists of glass fountains.

Alex and Daniel are both close friends with the Hodsons, who are a bohemian, academic middle-class family living in a leafy London suburb. They alternate having Sunday dinner with the Hodsons, who are aware of their relationships but do not talk about them, though the Hodson children are inclined to snicker. Alex also has a depressed client who has recently lost his job to age discrimination. They sleep together at Alex's flat. However, Bob and Daniel have a fight, which motivates Bob to visit Alex at her residence. Upon his arrival, the couple pretend to be having a casual drink. Bob tells Alex that he has no problem with her sleeping with other men. They are, in his words, "free".

The Hodsons' family dog is run over by a truck which narrowly misses the eldest daughter Lucy. Daniel has to deal with a former lover who is a heroin addict. After unsuccessfully trying to fill a heroin prescription for him at a pharmacy, being unable to prove he is a doctor, Daniel finds that his medical bag has been stolen from his car.

For Alex, the relationship is bound up with growing disillusion about her professional life, failed marriage and uneasy childhood. For Daniel, it represents an escape from the repressed nature of his Jewish upbringing. Both realise the lack of permanence about the situation. When Bob decides to leave the country to settle in New York, after receiving an offer to open his own art gallery, they both come face to face for the first time in the narrative. Despite their opposed circumstances, Daniel and Alex come to realise that it is time to move on; Bob leaves for the United States.

The film ends with an unconventional speech from Daniel directly to the audience. He muses on his relationship with Bob, his friends' concern for his happiness, and declares "I am happy, apart from missing him." His last remark is "I only came about my cough," often a punch-line to a joke about a man going to the doctor and getting unexpected news.

== Cast ==
- Peter Finch as Dr. Daniel Hirsh
- Glenda Jackson as Alex Greville
- Murray Head as Bob Elkin
- Peggy Ashcroft as Mrs. Greville
- Tony Britton as George Harding
- Maurice Denham as Mr. Greville
- Bessie Love as answering service lady
- Vivian Pickles as Alva Hodson
- Frank Windsor as Bill Hodson
- Kimi Tallmadge as Lucy, oldest of the Hodson children
- Emma Schlesinger as an Hodson child
- Thomas Baptiste as Professor Johns
- Richard Pearson as patient
- June Brown as woman patient
- Hannah Norbert as Daniel's mother
- Harold Goldblatt as Daniel's father
- Russell Lewis as Timothy Hodson
- Marie Burke as Aunt Astrid
- Caroline Blakiston as rowing wife
- Peter Halliday as rowing husband
- Jon Finch as Scotsman
- Robert Rietti as Daniel's brother
- Douglas Lambert as man at party
- Niké Arrighi as party guest
- Edward Evans as husband at hospital
- Gabrielle Daye as wife at hospital
- Esta Charkham as bar mitzvah guest
- Petra Markham (uncredited) as designer's girlfriend
- Daniel Day-Lewis (uncredited) as child vandal
- John Warner (uncredited) as party guest
- Martin Lawrence as the rabbi

== Production ==
=== Development ===
Schlesinger had the idea for the film when making Far from the Madding Crowd. The film took five years of development. "There were endless delays," said the director. "No one was very keen about our doing the film." There were casting problems. "For what it is it ended up being terribly expensive."

=== Writing ===
The film was partly based on Schlesinger's personal experience as a Jewish English gay man. He approached Penelope Gilliatt, who had recently finished a novel, A Statement of Change, about a love triangle involving a doctor, and asked if she would write a script. They collaborated extensively on the first draft.

The relationship between Schlesinger and Gilliatt was somewhat difficult. According to John Schlesinger biographer William J. Mann, the first draft came out of intensive collaboration and brainstorming sessions between Schlesinger and Gillatt. Schlesinger and producer Joseph Janni did not like Gilliatt's dialogues. By that time, Gilliatt already moved to New York to work for The New Yorker magazine, and did not want to return to London to revise the script. David Sherwin was brought in to do an extensive rewrite. Sherwin and Schlesinger are not credited for the script, because Gilliatt had it in her contract that she would be the sole scriptwriter.

After the film's success in the United Kingdom, Gilliatt took the sole credit in the published final script in her interviews, going as far as stating that the "ideas had been hers", while in fact the initial idea was Schlesinger's and the story was very personal to him. Producer Joseph Janni wrote her a letter, asking her to acknowledge the collaborative nature of the final script, stating

I have just received a copy of the book of SUNDAY BLOODY SUNDAY and I am flabbergasted at the note at the back which says that you "first thought of this film script on a train in Switzerland".

I am writing this letter to you because of what has happened for some time with regard to verbal and written statements, ... all made by you with regard to the authorship.... You have gone out of your way to want to create in everybody's mind the impression that the subject and the subsequent script were entirely your creation....

I want to be very clear that we do not want to take away from you any glory or fail to recognise the marvellous work you have done on the script of SUNDAY BLOODY SUNDAY. I wish, however, that any statement made about this work should correspond to the truth as I have stated it above and the reason for my writing this letter is to ask you to do so, so that we should not be forced, especially when coming to America for the opening of the film, to have to deny certain statements or make declarations which will conflict with yours and which ultimately will not be pleasant for any of us.

=== Casting ===
The original choice for Alex was Vanessa Redgrave.

John Schlesinger said he wanted Peter Finch for the role of Daniel Hirsh. However, he was meant to star in a film version of Man's Fate and so was unavailable. He then cast Alan Bates, but Bates was held up filming The Go-Between (1970), so Ian Bannen was cast. Apparently, Bannen was so nervous about what kissing another male actor on screen might do to his career that he could not concentrate enough to even get going with the part. He later said that losing the role set back his career, and regretted it till his death. He was replaced by Finch, who had by then—the André Malraux project having abruptly unraveled—become available.

Schlesinger was thinking of casting Jean Simmons until he saw Glenda Jackson in Women in Love and decided to offer her the role.

Several actresses (including Dame Edith Evans and Thora Hird) politely refused the part of Glenda Jackson's mother, Mrs. Greville, because they thought the project was too risqué. Dame Peggy Ashcroft accepted, after the director explained to her the elements of the story, and she gladly signed on.

=== Filming ===
Filming took place from March to August 1970.

Daniel Day-Lewis made his film debut in an uncredited role as a vandal. He described the experience as "heaven", getting paid £2 to vandalise expensive cars parked near St Alfege Church, Greenwich. The sequence showed children walking alongside a line of parked cars, casually scraping the cars' paintwork with keys, coins, and broken bottles.

Of the kiss scene between Head and Finch, Schlesinger said he wanted to direct it in a "purely natural" way. The director told the New York Times, "Both Peter and Murray were totally involved in their parts and they were certainly less shocked by the kiss than some of the technicians."

"We were eager to make a tender film," said Schlesinger.

During filming Head was in a motorbike accident and the child actors came down with measles.

=== Music ===
The film makes extensive use of source music including a leitmotif of the trio Soave sia il vento from Mozart's opera Così fan tutte.

== Release ==
Schlesinger says that when he showed the film to United Artists executives in New York, "they were all appalled except David Picker. They were prepared to let it quietly die."

The film had its premiere at the Leicester Square Theatre in London on 1 July 1971.

=== Box office ===
The film performed strongly at the box office in urban centres but was not popular outside these and ultimately lost money. It grossed £20,149 in its first 13 days of release at the Leicester Square Theatre.

=== Critical reception ===
The film holds an 83% rating on Rotten Tomatoes from 30 reviews. The consensus summarizes: "Led by strong performances from its three leads, Sunday Bloody Sunday takes a sophisticated and groundbreaking look at the complexities of love."

Peter Rainer of Bloomberg News wrote, "It's Finch's finest moment as an actor (and literally a far cry from his most famous role as the 'mad prophet of the airwaves' in Network). As for Jackson, she was never better, more variegated."

This film appeared on both Roger Ebert and Gene Siskel's Top 10 list of 1971, listed as No. 5 and No. 6 respectively. Roger Ebert commented, "The official East Coast line on John Schlesinger's Sunday Bloody Sunday was that it is civilized. That judgment was enlisted to carry the critical defense of the movie; and, indeed, how can the decent critic be against a civilized movie about civilized people? My notion, all the same, is that Sunday Bloody Sunday is about people who suffer from psychic amputation, not civility, and that this film is not an affirmation but a tragedy... I think Sunday Bloody Sunday is a masterpiece, but I don't think it's about what everybody else seems to think it's about. This is not a movie about the loss of love, but about its absence."

Director Pedro Almodóvar has cited Sunday Bloody Sunday as one of his favorite films.

=== Accolades ===
| Award | Category | Nominee(s) | Result | Ref. |
|---|---|---|---|---|
| Academy Awards | Best Director | John Schlesinger | Nominated | |
| Academy Awards | Best Actor | Peter Finch | Nominated | |
| Academy Awards | Best Actress | Glenda Jackson | Nominated | |
| Academy Awards | Best Story and Screenplay – Based on Factual Material or Material Not Previously Produced or Published | Penelope Gilliatt | Nominated | |
| British Academy Film Awards | Best Film | John Schlesinger | Won | |
| British Academy Film Awards | Best Direction | John Schlesinger | Won | |
| British Academy Film Awards | Best Actor in a Leading Role | Peter Finch | Won | |
| British Academy Film Awards | Best Actress in a Leading Role | Glenda Jackson | Won | |
| British Academy Film Awards | Best Screenplay | Penelope Gilliatt | Nominated | |
| British Academy Film Awards | Best Cinematography | Billy Williams | Nominated | |
| British Academy Film Awards | Best Editing | Richard Marden | Won | |
| British Academy Film Awards | Best Sound | David Campling, Simon Kaye, and Gerry Humphreys | Nominated | |
| David di Donatello Awards | Best Foreign Director | John Schlesinger | Won | |
| Directors Guild of America Awards | Outstanding Directorial Achievement in Motion Pictures | John Schlesinger | Nominated | |
| Golden Globe Awards | Best Foreign Film – English-Language | | Won | |
| Golden Globe Awards | Best Actor in a Motion Picture – Drama | Peter Finch | Nominated | |
| National Society of Film Critics Awards | Best Actor | Peter Finch | Won | |
| National Society of Film Critics Awards | Best Screenplay | Penelope Gilliatt | Won | |
| National Society of Film Critics Awards | Best Cinematography | Billy Williams | 3rd Place | |
| New York Film Critics Circle Awards | Best Actor | Peter Finch | Runner-up | |
| New York Film Critics Circle Awards | Best Screenplay | Penelope Gilliatt | Won (Note: Tied with Larry McMurtry and Peter Bogdanovich for The Last Picture Show.) | |
| Writers Guild of America Awards | Best Drama – Written Directly for the Screen | Penelope Gilliatt | Won | |
| Writers' Guild of Great Britain Awards | Best British Original Screenplay | Penelope Gilliatt | Won | |

=== Home media ===
Sunday Bloody Sunday was released on Blu-ray by the Criterion Collection in North America and by the BFI in the British Isles.

== See also ==
- BFI Top 100 British films
- London in film
- Entertaining Mr. Sloane
