= John Paxton =

American screenwriter (1911–1985)

- Born: May 21, 1911; Kansas City, Missouri, United States
- Died: January 5, 1985 (aged 73); Santa Monica, California, United States
- Occupation: Screenwriter

John Paxton (May 21, 1911 – January 5, 1985) was an American screenwriter.

Some of his films include Murder, My Sweet in 1944, Cornered in 1945, Crossfire in 1947 (an adaptation of the controversial novel The Brick Foxhole that earned him his only Oscar nomination). He helped adapt the screenplay for the controversial film The Wild One in 1953, starring Marlon Brando.

Paxton's work twice received the Mystery Writers of America's Edgar Award for Best Motion Picture Screenplay, for Murder, My Sweet and Crossfire.

== Biography ==
Paxton was born in Kansas City in 1911. He attended the University of Missouri where he studied journalism and was involved in college plays.

He went to New York. A cousin of Paxton's father did publicity for Katherine Cornell and got him a job organising a play-writing contest for the Theatre Guild. He went to work at Stage magazine as an assistant and ended up doing reviews . He became friends with a fellow reviewer, Adrian Scott with whom Paxton would later work in Hollywood.

When Stage magazine folded in 1943 Paxton moved to Hollywood and did a variety of jobs, including ghost writing. In 1943 Scott became established at RKO as a producer and got Paxton a job there was a writer.

=== RKO ===
Paxton's first credit was for My Pal Wolf (1944), a girl-and-dog film. Paxton gained critical praise for his adaptation of Raymond Chandler's Farewell, My Lovely, Murder, My Sweet (1944). This was produced by Adrian Scott and directed by Edward Dmytryk, and starred Dick Powell.

Paxton was reunited with Powell, Dmytryk and Scott on a film noir Cornered (1945). He worked on another noir, Crack-Up (1946) with Pat O'Brien, then made a third film with Scott and Dmytryk, So Well Remembered (1947).

The three men combined for a fourth time on Crossfire (1947), a thriller about anti-Semitism that was a huge critical and commercial success. The team broke up, however, when Dmytryk and Scott were blacklisted and fired from RKO. Paxton took over from Scott as producer of an adaptation of Scott's play The Great Man's Whiskers but it was not made. The Boy with Green Hair which Paxton and Scott were going to make was made by others. Paxton quit RKO in July 1948.

Paxton did some work on the script for Rope of Sand (1948) for Hal Wallis and worked on the documentary Of Men and Music (1951).

Paxton went to 20th Century Fox where he wrote Fourteen Hours (1951).

=== Columbia ===
Paxton was hired by Stanley Kramer, who released through Columbia, to adapt the story for The Wild One (1953). He went to MGM to write The Cobweb (1955) then re-wrote R.C. Sheriff's script for A Prize of Gold (1955) for Warwick Films who released through Columbia.

Warwick liked Paxton's work and hired him to write Interpol (1957). He went on to write and produce How to Murder a Rich Uncle (1957) for Warwick.

Kramer hired Paxton to adapt the Nevil Shute novel On the Beach (1959) as a film.

Paxton went into television writing "Aftermath" for General Electric Theater.

=== Later career ===
Paxton had no feature film credits for the 1960s. However he won a Golden Globe and an award from the Writers Guild of America in 1971 for his screenplay to the Walter Matthau film Kotch.

Paxton adapted a play by Adrian Scott for television, The Great Man's Whiskers (1972).

He worked on the cartoon series I Am the Greatest!: The Adventures of Muhammad Ali (1977).

== Personal life ==
Paxton married Sarah Jane Miles Dec. 4, 1948. She worked in public relations for 20th Century Fox. They had no children. He died of complications from emphysema.

Paxton was an uncle of comic book writer Ed Brubaker. Paxton's life inspired Brubaker's 2013 series The Fade Out.
