= Penelope Gilliatt =

English writer and film critic (1932–1993)

- Born: Penelope Ann Douglass Conner; 25 March 1932; London, England
- Died: 9 May 1993 (aged 61); London, England
- Occupations: Film critic and novelist
- Spouse(s): Roger Gilliatt (m. 1954; divorced) John Osborne (m. 1963; div. 1968)
- Partner: Vincent Canby
- Children: 1 daughter (with Osborne)

Penelope Gilliatt (/ˈdʒɪliət/; born Penelope Ann Douglass Conner; 25 March 1932 – 9 May 1993) was an English novelist, short story writer, screenwriter, and film critic. As one of the main film critics for The New Yorker magazine in the 1960s and 1970s, Gilliatt was known for her detailed descriptions and evocative reviews. A writer of short stories, novels, non-fiction books, and screenplays, Gilliatt was nominated for an Academy Award for Best Original Screenplay for Sunday Bloody Sunday (1971).

== Film criticism ==
Gilliatt began her work as a film and theatre critic with London's The Observer, where she wrote numerous reviews between 1961 and 1967. In 1967, she began a column in The New Yorker, in which she alternated for six-month intervals with Pauline Kael as that publication's chief film critic. Gilliatt's column ran from late spring to early fall, and Kael's for the remainder of the year. The contrasting perspectives of Kael and Gilliatt were a significant attraction to the magazine. Gilliatt's criticism tended to focus on visual metaphors and imagery, describing scenes from films in detail in her characteristically grandiose style. She also prided herself on knowing actors and directors personally, and tended to interweave her acquaintance with them into reviews of their films. Many of Gilliatt's readers appreciated her colourful and detailed writing, while other readers saw her style as distracting and superfluous to film criticism, and felt that her description of films was too complete.

Gilliatt wrote profiles on many directors, with her favourite directors including Ingmar Bergman, Jean Renoir, Luis Buñuel, Jeanne Moreau, and Woody Allen.

Her career as a film critic for The New Yorker ended in 1979, after it was determined that a profile she had written of Graham Greene contained unattributed passages taken from a piece about Greene by novelist Michael Meshaw that had appeared in The Nation two years before. The fact-checker had warned editor William Shawn of the plagiarism, but Shawn published the article anyway. Following its appearance, Greene said that Gilliatt’s ”so-called Profile” of him was “inaccurate” and the product of a “rather wild imagination.” Although she no longer wrote film criticism for The New Yorker, Gilliatt continued to publish fiction in the magazine.

Some of her film (and theatre) writing was first collected in Unholy Fools: Wits, Comics, Disturbers of the Peace: Film & Theater (1973), which reprints articles first published in The Guardian, Harper's Bazaar / Queen / Harper's & Queen, The New Yorker, The Observer, The Spectator, and Vogue. A later collection, Three-Quarter Face: Reports & Reflections (1980), features articles from The New Yorker and her "Nabokov" article from Vogue. In addition, Gilliatt published two non-fiction books on two French film directors, Jean Renoir: Essays, Conversations, Reviews (1975) and Jacques Tati (1976), as well as a book on comedy, To Wit: Skin and Bones of Comedy (1990).

== Fiction ==
In addition to her criticism and non-fiction books, Gilliatt wrote short stories, novels, teleplays, and one screenplay. The film was Sunday Bloody Sunday (1971), an accepting treatment of homosexuality based on a personal story of the director John Schlesinger. She was approached by Schlesinger to collaborate on the script in part because of her debut novel One by One. She wrote the first draft, then left the project to take a job at The New Yorker. The final script was extensively revised by David Sherwin and John Schlesinger in her absence. For the film script, she won several Best Screenplay awards, including the New York Film Critics Circle Award, Writers Guild of America, USA, and Writers' Guild of Great Britain. The screenplay was also nominated for an Academy Award and a BAFTA.

Gilliatt wrote several novels, including One by One (1965), A State of Change (1967), The Cutting Edge (1978), Mortal Matters (1983), and A Woman of Singular Occupation (1988). Mortal Matters, much concerned with shipbuilding and suffragettes, is largely set in Northumberland and Newcastle. There are several pages devoted to Hexham, and numerous mentions of Newcastle locations. She celebrates the achievements of the North East, including the vessels Mauretania and Charles Parsons' Turbinia. Gilliatt also praises the Torrens, the Sunderland-built ship on which Joseph Conrad served for two years from 1891.

Gilliatt's short stories, many of which were first published in The New Yorker, were collected in What's It Like Out? and Other Stories (UK edition, 1968) / Come Back If It Doesn't Get Better (US edition, 1969), Nobody's Business (1972), Splendid Lives (1977), Quotations from Other Lives (1982), They Sleep Without Dreaming (1985), 22 Stories (1986), and Lingo (1990).

== Personal life ==
Born in London, Gilliatt was the daughter of a barrister named Cyril Conner. Her mother was Marie Stephanie Douglass. Both parents came from Newcastle upon Tyne, and divorced not long after their daughter's birth. Gilliatt had an upper-middle class upbringing in Northumberland, where her father (having left his legal practice) was director of the BBC in the north east from 1938 to 1941, and she retained a lifelong love of the Roman Wall country. Gilliatt attended Queen's College in London before earning a scholarship to attend Bennington College in Vermont.

Gilliatt married neurologist Roger Gilliatt in 1954. He served as Anthony Armstrong-Jones’s best man during his wedding to Princess Margaret in 1960, and she carried on using his name after their divorce. Gilliatt was then married to playwright John Osborne from 1963 to 1968, living at 31 Chester Square in central London in a house designed by architect Sir Hugh Casson. She gave birth to their only child, a daughter named Nolan, whom Osborne later disowned. Following her divorce from Osborne, she was romantically involved with Mike Nichols and Edmund Wilson. The New York Times film critic Vincent Canby was her companion for many years. Gilliatt died from alcoholism in 1993.

== Bibliography ==
=== Novels ===
- One by One (Secker & Warburg/Atheneum, 1965)
- A State of Change (Secker & Warburg/Random House, 1967)
- The Cutting Edge (Secker & Warburg/Coward, McCann & Geoghegan, 1978)
- Mortal Matters (Macmillan/Coward-McCann, 1983)
- A Woman of Singular Occupation (Weidenfeld & Nicolson, 1988)

=== Stories ===
- What's It Like Out? (Secker & Warburg, 1968) aka Come Back if It Doesn't Get Better (Random House, 1969)
- Nobody's Business (Secker & Warburg/Viking, 1972)
- Splendid Lives (Secker & Warburg/Coward, McCann & Geoghegan, 1977)
- Quotations from Other Lives (Secker & Warburg/Coward, McCann & Geoghegan, 1982)
- They Sleep Without Dreaming (Macmillan/Dodd, Mead, 1985)
- 22 Stories (Dodd, Mead, 1986)
- Lingo (Weidenfeld & Nicolson, 1990)

=== Other ===
- Unholy Fools: Wits, Comics, Disturbers of the Peace: Film & Theatre (Secker & Warburg/Viking, 1973)
- Jean Renoir: Essays, Conversations, Reviews (McGraw-Hill, 1975)
- Jacques Tati (Woburn Press, 1976)
- Three-Quarter Face: Reports & Reflections (Coward, McCann & Geoghegan, 1980)
- To Wit: Skin and Bones of Comedy (Scribner's, 1990)
