= Lonesome Dove series =

Novel series

The Lonesome Dove series is a series of four Western fiction novels written by Larry McMurtry and the five television miniseries and television series based upon them.

== Overview ==
The novels and miniseries follow the exploits of several members of the Texas Ranger Division from the time of the Republic of Texas up until the beginning of the 20th century. Recurring characters include Augustus "Gus" McCrae, Woodrow F. Call, Joshua Deets, Pea Eye Parker, Jake Spoon, Clara Forsythe Allen, Maggie Tilton, Lorena Wood Parker, Blue Duck, and Buffalo Hump. The series is set within historical events and characters, although they are often adapted or altered to accommodate the fictional timelines of the main characters.

== History ==
=== Early days ===
Larry McMurtry was born into a cattle ranching family, and some of his uncles were old enough to have participated in the end of the cattle driving days. Before railroads went across the country, cattle drives had to be put on in order to move cattle to their set destinations. This era is where the history of the cowboys originated and eventually became romanticized. McMurtry realized that being a cowboy was not as good as people thought and decided to write a novel showing the hardships cowboys really faced.

=== Creating Lonesome Dove ===
McMurtry originally planned to create a western screenplay called Streets of Laredo, which would star John Wayne. This did not pan out, so McMurtry turned the screenplay into a novel. He took inspiration from Charles Goodnight's 1860 cattle drives, The Log of a Cowboy, and Nelson Story's 1866 drive from Texas to Montana.

== Novels ==
In order of publication:

1. Lonesome Dove (1985)
2. Streets of Laredo (1993)
3. Dead Man's Walk (1995)
4. Comanche Moon (1997)

In order of internal chronology:

1. Dead Man's Walk – set in the early 1840s
2. Comanche Moon – set in the 1850–60s
3. Lonesome Dove – set in mid-to-late 1870s
4. Streets of Laredo – set in the early 1890s

== Summaries ==
=== Lonesome Dove ===
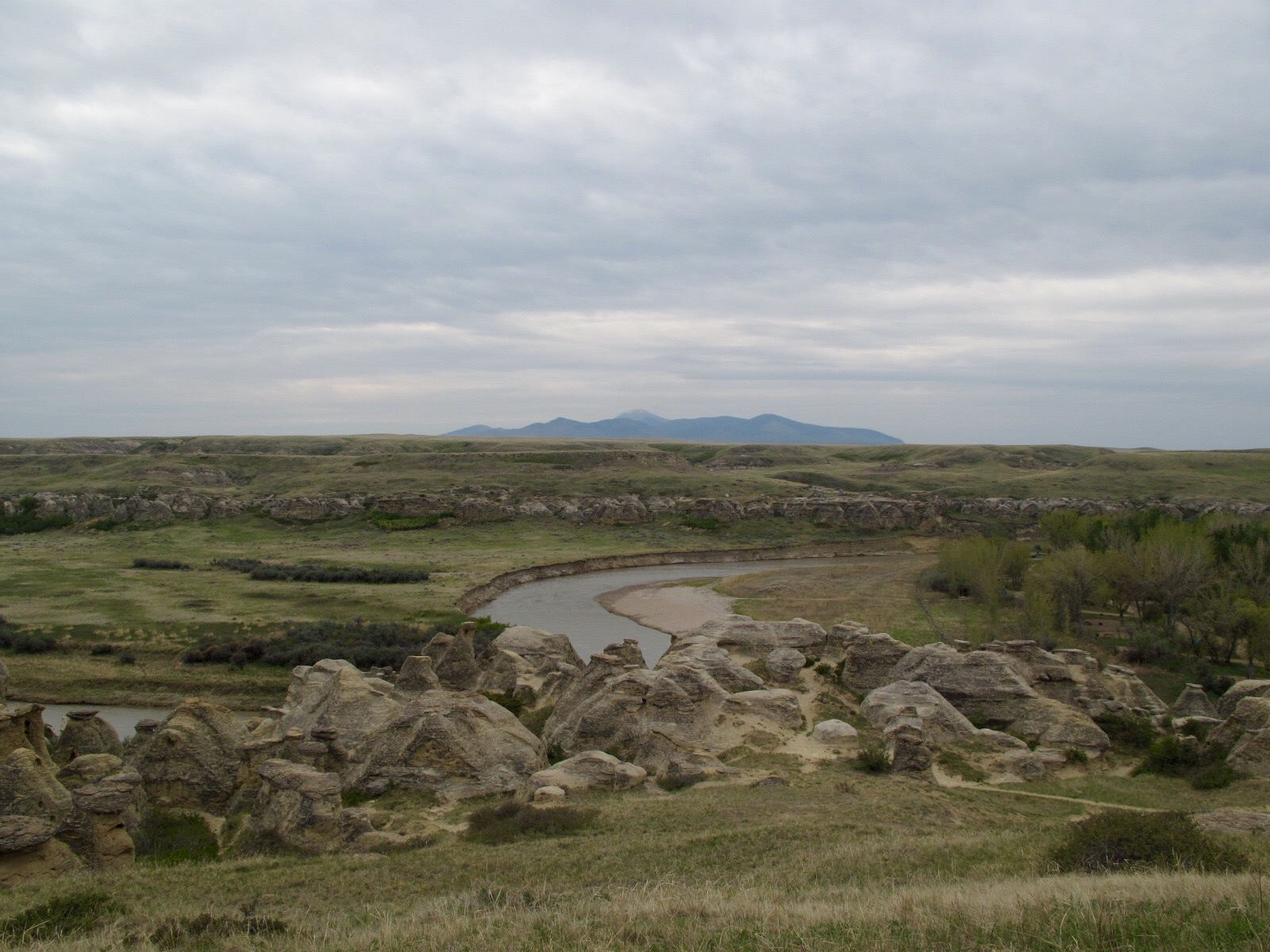
The Milk River in Montana is where the Hat Creek Cattle Company sets up their ranch.

Lonesome Dove follows two retired Texas Rangers, Woodrow F. Call and Augustus "Gus" McCrae, who in the mid to late 1870s run the Hat Creek Cattle Company in Lonesome Dove, a small fictional town on the Rio Grande (and Mexican border) of southern Texas. Retirement does not suit Captain Call and he grows restless. Gus does not mind retirement, but he misses Clara, the love of his life, who he learns now lives in Nebraska with her husband and children. Jake Spoon, another former Ranger, suddenly reappears after more than 10 years and tells them about Montana, describing it as a "cattleman's paradise" but also warns that it is a "damn wilderness." Based on this information, they determine to embark on a cattle drive from Texas to Montana, where they would set up a ranch and tame another wild country. Jake Spoon would not go on this drive all the way to Montana, but other notable people would, including Pea Eye Parker, an illiterate former Ranger who was under the command of and later works under Call and Gus; Joshua Deets, a tracker and another former Ranger; Newt Dobbs, a young man who works for the Hat Creek Cattle Company; Lorena, a prostitute who resided in the town; and Bolivar, a former Mexican bandit turned cook. While they are still in Texas, a Mexican-Indian known as Blue Duck (who was previously known to Call and Gus) causes problems for the cattle drive. Along the way, they deal with other characters, inclement weather, and treacherous terrain. The group eventually reaches Montana, but several of the men who embarked on the mission die along the way. Near the end of the book, Call makes a promise to Gus that adds to the storyline of their friendship.

=== Streets of Laredo ===
In Streets of Laredo, Woodrow Call is hired by a railroad company, and is tasked with taking down Joey Garza, a skilled sniper who has been killing railroad workers. Ned Brookshire, a salaried man who works with the railroad company, accompanies Call on his mission. Call attempts to recruit Pea Eye Parker, but he declines, as he now has a family and is married to Lorena. However, shortly after Call leaves, Pea eye's guilty conscience convinces him to go after Call. As they get closer to Joey Garza they encounter more foes, such as Mox Mox, a man who used to work under Blue Duck. In the end Joey Garza is defeated, thus concluding the Lonesome Dove series.

=== Dead Man's Walk ===
Dead Man's Walk follows Woodrow Call and Augustus McCrae (Gus) back in their younger days. On their first expedition the Rangers are stalked by Buffalo Hump, a Comanche Chief. After this expedition concludes, Call and Gus join another expedition led by a man named Colonel Cobb. The expedition started with 200 men, but quickly drops to 40 after many of them are either killed or desert. Shortly after being reduced to 40 men, they are captured by Mexican soldiers. Here, they are forced to march through the Dead Man's Walk; at the end of the journey only 10 men have survived. They are forced to partake in a grim ceremony, involving beans, which results in half of them being executed. Luckily Call and Gus survive, and the book ends with Gus and Call making it back to town where Clara lives.

=== Comanche Moon ===
Comanche Moon follows Gus and Call in the middle of their ranger years. This book also reintroduces Joshua Deets and Pea Eye Parker. Here they work under Captain Inish Scull attempting to track down Kicking Wolf, a Comanche horse thief. However, a Mexican bandit named Ahumado captures Kicking Wolf before Inish Scull can. Eventually Inish Scull finds Kicking Wolf but frees him. Scull gets captured by Ahumado and he is put into a cage where he is expected to die. While this is going on Buffalo Hump leads an assault on Austin. Before Inish Scull dies or goes crazy, Call and Gus save him. The group then returns to Austin where Inish Scull is promoted General. Meanwhile, Ahumando is bitten by a poisonous spider and walks south. It is assumed that he succumbs to this venomous bite on his way to a "tree of medicines in the south" he believes will cure him. After this, Blue Duck kills his father after he finds out that Buffalo Hump left them to go die.

== Television miniseries ==
1. Lonesome Dove (1989)
2. Return to Lonesome Dove (1993) – This miniseries is set a year after the events of Lonesome Dove. The story was written by John Wilder. McMurtry was not involved in the production of this and he was not happy when CBS implied that he was a collaborator.
3. Streets of Laredo (1995)
4. Dead Man's Walk (1996)
5. Comanche Moon (2008)

=== Primary characters ===
Color key
Main cast ("Starring" in opening credits)
Secondary cast ("Also starring" in opening credits)
Guest cast ("Special guest star" in opening credits or co-starring)

Role	Actor				
Role	Lonesome Dove (1989)	Return to Lonesome Dove (1993)	Streets of Laredo (1995)	Dead Man's Walk (1996)	Comanche Moon (2008)
Starring
Captain Augustus "Gus" McCrae	Robert Duvall			David Arquette	Steve Zahn
Captain Woodrow F. Call	Tommy Lee Jones	Jon Voight	James Garner	Jonny Lee Miller	Karl Urban
Joshua Deets	Danny Glover				Keith Robinson
Lorena Wood	Diane Lane		Sissy Spacek		
Jake Spoon	Robert Urich				Ryan Merriman
Blue Duck	Frederic Forrest				Adam Beach
Dishwater "Dish" Boggett	D. B. Sweeney				
Newt Dobbs	Ricky Schroder	Ricky Schroder			Joseph Castanon
Clara Forsythe Allen	Anjelica Huston	Barbara Hershey		Jennifer Garner	Linda Cardellini
Isom Pickett		Louis Gossett Jr.			
Gideon Walker		William Petersen			
Gregor Dunnigan		Oliver Reed			
"Cherokee Jack" Jackson		Dennis Haysbert			
Ferris Dunnigan		Reese Witherspoon			
Corporal "Pea Eye" Parker	Tim Scott	Tim Scott	Sam Shepard		Troy Baker
July Johnson	Chris Cooper	Chris Cooper			
Sara Pickett		CCH Pounder			
Agostina Vega		Nia Peeples			
Judge Roy Bean			Ned Beatty		
John Wesley Hardin			Randy Quaid		
Famous Shoes			Wes Studi		David Midthunder
Ned Brookshire			Charles Martin Smith		
Billy Williams			George Carlin		
Joey Garza			Alexis Cruz		
"Mox-Mox"			Kevin Conway		
Charles Goodnight			James Gammon	Chris Penn	Jeremy Ratchford
Deputy Ted Plunkert			Tristan Tait		
Maria Garza			Sônia Braga		
Caleb Cobb				F. Murray Abraham	
William "Bigfoot" Wallace				Keith Carradine	
Matilda Jane				Patricia Childress	
Major Chevallier				Brian Dennehy	
Captain Salazar				Edward James Olmos	
Chief Buffalo Hump				Eric Schweig	Wes Studi
Shadrach				Harry Dean Stanton	
Major Laroche				Joaquim de Almeida	
Inish Scull					Val Kilmer
Maggie Tilton				Gretchen Mol	Elizabeth Banks
"Long Bill" Coleman				Ray McKinnon	Ray McKinnon
Governor Elisha Pease					James Rebhorn
Tudwal					Jake Busey
Inez Scull					Rachel Griffiths
Also starring
Elmira "Ellie" Johnson	Glenne Headley				
Deputy Roscoe Brown	Barry Corbin				
"Lippy" Jones	William Sanderson	William Sanderson			
Jasper Fant	Barry Tubb	Barry Tubb			
Dan Suggs	Gavan O'Herlihy				
Luke	Steve Buscemi				
"Big Zwey"	Frederick Coffin				
Allan O'Brien	Travis Swords				
Doctor	Kevin O'Morrison				
Old Hugh	Ron Weyand				
Needle Nelson		David Carpenter			
Bolivar		Leon Singer			
Cholo		Jack Caffrey			
Isaac Pickett		Reginald T. Dorsey			
Estrella			Míriam Colón		
Beulah			Anjanette Comer		
Sheriff Doniphon			Dave S. Cass Sr.		
Gordo			James Victor		
Johnny Carthage				Tim Blake Nelson	
Captain Billy Falconer				Alastair Duncan	
Kirker				Brad Greenquist	
Jimmy Tweed				Kieran Mulroney	
Wesley Buttons				Jared Rushton	
Lady Lucinda Carey				Haviland Morris	
Emeralda				Akosua Busia	
Pearl Coleman					Melanie Lynskey
Ahumado					Sal Lopez
First Old Comanche					Floyd Westerman
Elmira Forsythe					Kristine Sutherland
Captain Richard King					Norbert Leo Butz
Therese Wanz					Indira Varma

== Television series ==
- Lonesome Dove: The Series (Syndication, 1994–1996)
- Lonesome Dove (Netflix, TBA)
