= Dead Man's Walk (miniseries) =

1996 American Western adventure television miniseries

- 1998 VHS Cover
- Genre: Western
- Based on: Dead Man's Walk by Larry McMurtry
- Teleplay by: Diana Ossana
- Directed by: Yves Simoneau
- Starring: David Arquette; Jonny Lee Miller; F. Murray Abraham; Keith Carradine; Brian Dennehy; Joaquim de Almeida; Edward James Olmos; Chris Penn; Harry Dean Stanton
- Composer: David Bell
- Country of origin: United States
- Original language: English
- No. of episodes: 3

Production
- Executive producers: Suzanne De Passe; Robert A. Halmi; Larry Levinson; Larry McMurtry; Diana Ossana
- Producer: Frank Q. Dobbs
- Production locations: Lajitas, Texas; Van Horn, Texas; Terlingua, Texas; CF Ranch - State Route 118, Alpine, Texas; Fort Davis, Texas; Big Bend Ranch State Park; Alpine, Texas
- Cinematography: Edward J. Pei
- Editor: Michael Ornstein
- Running time: 283 minutes
- Production companies: De Passe Entertainment; Hallmark Entertainment; Larry Levinson Productions; RHI Entertainment; Saria Company

Original release
- Network: ABC
- Release: May 12 – May 13, 1996

Related
- Lonesome Dove; Return to Lonesome Dove; Streets of Laredo; Comanche Moon

Dead Man's Walk is an American epic Western adventure television miniseries starring David Arquette as Augustus McCrae and Jonny Lee Miller as Woodrow F. Call. It was directed by Yves Simoneau. It is a three-part adaptation of the 1995 novel of the same name by Larry McMurtry and is chronologically the first book of the Lonesome Dove series. In this prequel to Lonesome Dove, it is 1840s Texas, and two young men join the Texas Rangers unit that is on a mission to annex Santa Fe. While the miniseries has been broken up into 3 parts for the DVD release, the series was originally broadcast by ABC over two nights in May 1996, and was later nominated for several awards.

== Plot ==
=== Part 1 ===
The series begins in the Republic of Texas in 1842, as Comanche warriors led by Buffalo Hump use the full moon to conduct slave-raids on settlements in northern Mexico. Woodrow Call and Augustus "Gus" McCrae are junior Texas Rangers of a larger party heading west to scout a road from San Antonio to El Paso. Tasked with night watching the camp, a drunk McCrae wanders off exploring and is chased and wounded by Buffalo Hump. The next morning, the group is ambushed and two of the party are killed and one wounded.

Three months later in Austin, a large group is being assembled in order to seize Santa Fe from the Mexicans as the Texan Santa Fe Expedition. McCrae encounters Clara Forsythe at the local store and Call meets Maggie at the local whorehouse. News of a Comanche raid takes the Rangers group west over the Brazos River, where they are ambushed while resting. Call manages the only kill of the punishment squad's raid and is promoted to corporal as a result, whereas McCrae proposes to Clara. Rejoining the expedition, they encounter Buffalo Hump again and learn (after inviting him to parley at their camp) that it was his son who died at the hands of Call.

=== Part 2 ===
The expedition begins to break up as it is slowed by heavy rains and many of the civilians opt to return to Austin. The increasingly rocky terrain of Comancheria also proves troublesome for the wagons. After meeting the ranger Charlie Goodnight, who explains that they're heading into country with no water, their native guides desert, stealing horses as they go. They again encounter the natives who harry them by shooting Call, stealing more horses and setting fire to the grasslands. Now on foot, with no horses and limited supplies, the party splits over gathering food and which way to travel to find water. McCrae, weakened by hunger and thirst, is haunted by a dream of Buffalo Hump riding a buffalo.

Wallace, Call, and McCrae are arrested by Mexican militia after stumbling into a remote Mexican village. En route to San Lazaro to be tried, the camp is attacked at night by a grizzly, allowing them to escape with rifles. In the darkness they re-find their companions, and the morning reveals a large Mexican army camp nearby. Now around 30, weakened by hunger, and with limited ammunition, Colonel Cobb enters the camp and surrenders to the Mexicans - but not without resistance from Call who attacks Cobb and receives 100 lashes as punishment.

The army breaks camp and moves with their prisoners through Apache lands. As they travel, the nights become increasingly cold, increasing the suffering of the travellers. They soon find the corpses of the Mexican general and his retinue, killed by the region's rogue natives, led by an Apache named Gomez - including Cobb who survived blinded and crippled. Many of the group are unfit for the "dead man's walk" through the wastelands and across "the big dry", more so after Cobb decides to die in a blaze of glory, killing Shadrach and injuring several others in the process. Finally they begin the desert crossing.

=== Part 3 ===
Continuing to cross the desert, their horses are soon stolen by the Apache. Their numbers dwindle as they are picked off one by one, until they finally reach the Rio Grande having survived the Jornada del Muerto.

Here the prisoners are transferred to a French Major in charge of a troop of lancers, and the disgraced Mexican Captain is told to return across the desert to his post despite the dangers. Told to bathe in a river, the prisoners panic when the army begins a practice military maneuver, and several more are killed by accident. They soon arrive at San Lazaro, a leper colony, and the seven surviving men are forced to select lots to decide who among them will be executed for treason. Bigfoot Wallace is among those executed. Also in the colony is an English prisoner, The Lady Carey, who along with her son Willie, and Lady-in-Waiting Emerald, having been ransomed and released, asks them to escort her back to Austin and offers to provision the journey.

On the way back they again travel back through Comancheria but are able to spook the Comanche. Lady Carey disrobes and sings an aria, while carrying a snake around her shoulders. But it is Emerald holding the sword that fulfils the prophecy from the prologue - that the Comanches will decline when a dark woman on a white mule carries a sword. Back in Austin, McCrae calls again on Clara, and Call turns to see Maggie leave the store. Clara and McCrae kiss while Call looks on awkwardly. Call looks out the window to see Maggie and the two share a meaningful look with each other.

== Cast ==
Starring

- F. Murray Abraham as Caleb Cobb
- Keith Carradine as William "Bigfoot" Wallace
- Patricia Childress as Matilda Jane
- Brian Dennehy as Major Chevallier
- Joaquim de Almeida as Major Laroche
- Edward James Olmos as Captain Salazar
- Chris Penn as Charles Goodnight
- Eric Schweig as Chief Buffalo Hump
- Harry Dean Stanton as Shadrach
- David Arquette as Augustus "Gus" McCrae
- Jonny Lee Miller as Woodrow F. Call

Also starring

- Ray McKinnon as Bill "Long Bill" Coleman
- Jennifer Garner as Clara Forsythe Allen
- Tim Blake Nelson as Johnny Carthage
- Alastair Duncan as Captain Billy Falconer
- Brad Greenquist as Kirker
- Kieran Mulroney as Jimmy Tweed
- Jared Rushton as Wesley Buttons
- Haviland Morris as Lady Lucinda Carey
- Akosua Busia as Emeralda

== Production ==
The series teleplay was co-written by author Larry McMurtry and Diana Ossana, who had also worked on other parts of the Lonesome Dove series, and later went on to write the screenplay for Brokeback Mountain.

The budget was $20 million.

== Reception ==
A review by Don Heckman in the May 11, 1996 edition of the L.A. Times stated that "Director Yves Simoneau did the best he could with a script--by McMurtry and producer Diana Ossana--that provided little in the way of workable character development."

== Awards ==
The series and its actors were nominated for several awards:

- 1996 Emmy Awards: Nominated for Outstanding Individual Achievement in Music Composition for a Miniseries or a Special, David Bell.
- 1996 Lone Star Film & Television Awards: Best TV Teleplay, Larry McMurtry and Diana Ossana
- 1996 NCLR Bravo Awards: Edward James Olmos won for Outstanding Individual Performance in Made for Television Movie or Mini-Series

== Home media ==
Videos of the series were first released in August 1998 (see cover art). It was released in Region 1 on DVD on October 23, 2001.
