= Comanche Moon =

1997 novel by Larry McMurtry

- First edition
- Author: Larry McMurtry
- Cover artist: Chip Kidd (designer)
- Language: English
- Series: Lonesome Dove series
- Genre: Western
- Publisher: Simon & Schuster
- Publication date: 24 Nov 1997
- Publication place: United States
- Media type: Print (hardback & paperback)
- Pages: 752
- ISBN: 0-684-80754-8
- OCLC: 39144173
- Preceded by: Dead Man's Walk

Comanche Moon (1997) is a Western novel by American writer Larry McMurtry. It is the fourth and final book he published in the Lonesome Dove series. In terms of chronology, it is the second installment of the narrative. A Comanche Moon in Texas history was a full moon in autumn which permitted Comanche warriors to ride by night journeying southward to raid Mexico for livestock and captives.

The novel was adapted as a three-part television miniseries of the same name, first aired in January 2008.

== Plot introduction ==
In this bridge novel between McMurtry's Dead Man's Walk and Lonesome Dove, Woodrow Call and Gus McCrae are in their middle years, still serving as respected Texas Rangers.

== Plot summary ==
Texas Governor Elisha Pease sends a small troop of Texas Rangers, under the leadership of Captain Inish Scull, to the Llano Estacado in pursuit of Kicking Wolf, a celebrated Comanche horse thief. The Comanche steals Scull's horse Hector and takes it to the Sierra Perdida as a gift for Mexican bandit Ahumado. Scull promotes McCrae and Call to captains and orders them to lead the Ranger troop back to Austin. He sets off on foot after Kicking Wolf and his horse, accompanied only by Famous Shoes, a Kickapoo tracker.

Ahumado captures Kicking Wolf and his companion, Three Birds. The latter man leaps off a cliff to avoid Ahumado's plans for his death. Scull finds Kicking Wolf being dragged by the horse, and cuts the Comanche's bonds. Kicking Wolf survives to return to his tribe. Scull is captured by Ahumado, and placed in a cage for a slow death.

Having returned to Austin, McCrae learns that his beloved Clara Forsythe intends to marry his rival, horse trader Bob Allen. Call learns that his lover, Maggie Tilton, is pregnant with his child. Governor Pease sends Call and McCrae out with a typically small Ranger troop to rescue Captain Scull. While they are on this mission, Comanche chief Buffalo Hump takes his warriors on the warpath. They attack Austin. Prepared by Call, Maggie hides under a smokehouse and escapes their notice. The Rangers turn back to Austin as soon as they hear of the raid there.

Scull handles the cage so well that Ahumado has him taken down, and inflicts more pain. Ahumado sends word to Austin that he will return Scull for a ransom of one thousand cattle. Governor Pease sends the Rangers out again, to collect the cattle and exchange the herd for Scull. The Rangers go to Lonesome Dove in search of cattleman Captain King. Realizing they won't be able to collect that many cattle nor persuade King to sell them, Call and McCrae try to rescue Scull on their own terms. Bitten by a venomous spider, Ahumado goes South to die. Call and McCrae find Scull going insane in a pit, but they rescue him in time for his nearly total recovery. Scull returns to Austin and later becomes a general with the Union army.

Meanwhile, Buffalo Hump banishes his half-Mexican son Blue Duck. Blue Duck goes East and acquires wealth and notoriety as the leader of a gang of bandits. The novel moves more quickly, covering the period leading up to the sequel, Lonesome Dove. Maggie gives birth to Call's son Newt, but Call refuses to acknowledge the boy. Maggie goes to work at the general store, and Jake Spoon moves in with her. The Civil War takes most of the soldiers away from the frontier, enabling the Comanche to push back the white settlers. After the Civil War, Call and McCrae are sent in pursuit of Blue Duck and his band of renegades. Buffalo Hump has gone off to die. When Blue Duck learns of this he pursues his father. The Rangers attack his band, but Blue Duck has already left. He finds his father at his chosen place of death and kills him there. Maggie dies while the Rangers are on this expedition.

== Characters ==
- Woodrow Call — Texas Ranger
- Gus McCrae — Texas Ranger
- Clara Allen — Gus's former lover, a storekeeper's daughter
- Maggie Tilton — Woodrow's lover
- Inish Scull — Captain, Texas Ranger
- Inez Scull — wife of Inish Scull
- Long Bill Coleman — Texas Ranger
- Jake Spoon — Texas Ranger
- Pea Eye Parker — Texas Ranger
- Josh Deets — Texas Ranger
- Famous Shoes — the Rangers' Kickapoo tracker
- Buffalo Hump — Comanche war-chief
- Kicking Wolf — Comanche horse thief
- Blue Duck — son of Buffalo Hump
- Ahumado — Mexican bandit and murderer
- Goyeto — Ahumado's henchman and skinner (humans, not animals)
- Tana — member of Buffalo Hump's tribe

== Miniseries ==
A television adaptation of the novel first aired on CBS January 13, January 15, and January 16, 2008. It features actors Karl Urban as Woodrow F. Call, Steve Zahn as Augustus McCrae, Val Kilmer as Inish Scull (often given top billing), Elizabeth Banks as Maggie, Wes Studi as Buffalo Hump, Adam Beach as Blue Duck, and Jake Busey as Tudwal. Other stars include Linda Cardellini as Clara Forsythe, Rachel Griffiths as Inez Scull, and James Rebhorn as Elisha Pease.
