= Comanche Moon (miniseries) =

- Release poster
- Written by: Diana Ossana; Larry McMurtry
- Directed by: Simon Wincer
- Starring: Val Kilmer; Steve Zahn; Linda Cardellini; Elizabeth Banks; Ryan Merriman; Ray McKinnon; James Rebhorn; Adam Beach; Jake Busey; Wes Studi; Karl Urban; Melanie Lynskey; Rachel Griffiths
- Theme music composer: Lennie Niehaus
- Country of origin: United States
- Original language: English
- No. of episodes: 3

Production
- Producer: Dyson Lovell
- Cinematography: Alan Caso
- Editor: Terry Blythe
- Running time: 284 minutes
- Production companies: The Firm; Saria Inc.; CBS Paramount Television; Sony Pictures Television

Original release
- Network: CBS
- Release: January 13 – January 16, 2008

Comanche Moon is a 2008 American Western television miniseries, an adaptation of the 1997 novel Comanche Moon. Woodrow Call and Gus McCrae are in their middle years, serving as Texas Rangers. In terms of the Lonesome Dove series' storyline, this account serves as a prequel to the Lonesome Dove miniseries, and a sequel to Dead Man's Walk. The series was produced by The Firm, Saria Inc, CBS Paramount Television and Sony Pictures Television and aired on CBS from January 13 to January 16, 2008.

== Plot ==
=== Part 1 ===
The series starts in The Republic of Texas in the early 19th century with a massacre of Comanche chiefs, observed by a young Buffalo Hump. The opening explains that the Texas Rangers "were formed as a volunteer troop to contain the Comanche" and indicates the locale is north-west Texas in 1858. Woodrow Call and Augustus McCrae are among a party of eight men, led by Captain Scull and supported by a Kickapoo scout (Famous Shoes). They seek to capture Kicking Wolf, who is hiding in the camp of Buffalo Hump. Meanwhile, in Austin, Clara Forsythe runs her shop and is visited by Maggie Tilton; the two become closer while waiting for the rangers to return. In the nearby mansion, Inez Scull briefly seduces a young ranger, Jake Spoon.

The tables turn on the Rangers as the Captain's horse is stolen by Kicking Wolf. Scull departs with Famous Shoes to retrieve it, deputizing Call and McCrae to take the party back to Austin. The party comes across a burnt out wagon and are able to rescue a traumatized mother and her young daughters from some Comanche before returning to Austin. Separating from Famous Shoes at a river crossing to the Sierra, Scull tracks his horse alone towards Yellow Cliffs in northern Mexico, a known slavers den, and finds an injured Kicking Wolf but no horse. Buffalo Hump then plans a combined and perhaps final raid to the ocean for all Comanche. In Austin, having met the governor, McCrae and Forsythe reunite, as do Call and Tilton (who tells Call that she is carrying his child). Meanwhile, Scull is captured by Ahumado's men and put into a wooden cage. Call and McCrae, now confirmed as captains, are then tasked with retrieving Scull just as the Comanche army departs.

=== Part 2 ===
The show opens with a Comanche attack on Austin. Property losses are extensive, most of the men are killed, and women are raped or taken captive if they are young enough. Learning of this, the Rangers decide to return immediately. Ranger Bill Coleman suffers from his losses and hangs himself. Scull, having survived the cage, is moved to Ahumado's snake-pit while awaiting ransom. Blue Duck falls out with his father, Buffalo Hump, and is exiled, and the camp is devastated by cholera. Also, in Galveston, Clara Forsythe learns of her parents' death and loss of the store in Austin. Bob Allen, a horse-trader from Nebraska, proposes to her.

In Austin, the governor re-issues the order to Call and McCrae to rescue Scull, if they can convince cattle ranchers to provide them the 1000-head ransom on credit. Call tries to come to terms with being a father, while McCrae ponders why Clara chose Allen over him. En route to the ranchers, they have a run-in with some wild cattle before being directed to rancher Dick King and the "town" of Lonesome Dove. Unable to secure the ransom, Call and McCrae set off alone to rescue Scull. Meanwhile, Scull is alive in the snake pit. Ahumado is bitten by a spider and dies en route to a legendary medicine tree. The rest of the camp is abandoned. Scull is rescued and returned to Austin, where he suffers occasional delusions. McCrae loses the love of Clara when she learns of his affair with Inez. Call cannot commit to marrying Maggie and claiming her newborn son, named Newton, as his.

=== Part 3 ===
Seven years later, in 1865, the American Civil War ends. Call is still single and McCrae is mourning the death of his wife Nellie. Call is blind to Spoon moving in with Maggie (who works at the store). He can neither admit feelings for her or accept his son, even though he regularly has dinner with the pair. Spoon leaves for other opportunities. In Austin, Governor Pease is in charge, but the pending arrival of Union cavalry represents a new phase in the struggle with the Comanche. Rangers are to serve as scouts. In Nebraska, Clara Allen, now a mother of two, hears of Nellie's death and mourns the loss of her own son, too. In Boston, the Sculls are still married.

On the plains, Blue Duck continues to attack and kill settlers. Led by Charles Goodnight, the Rangers and cavalry locate a Comanche camp, and recapture "the Parker girl", now a woman who has assimilated to the Comanche. Heading back to Austin, they meet Clara Allen, who is visiting to sell her family's property. Clara and McCrae rekindle their friendship, and she returns to her family in Nebraska. Maggie begins showing symptoms of TB. At the Comanche camp, Buffalo Hump leaves for good. His brother-in-law relays the news to his nephew, Blue Duck, at his forest hideaway. The Rangers and sheriffs raid the Comanche camp but Blue Duck has already left seeking to kill his father. His death represents the end of an era for the region. Maggie dies of TB, and Newt is taken in by Pearl and Rippley.

== Cast ==
- Val Kilmer as Inish Scull
- Steve Zahn as Augustus "Gus" McCrae
- Karl Urban as Woodrow F. Call
- Linda Cardellini as Clara Forsythe Allen
- Elizabeth Banks as Maggie Tilton
- Ryan Merriman as Jake Spoon
- Ray McKinnon as Bill Coleman
- Keith Robinson as Joshua Deets
- Wes Studi as Chief Buffalo Hump
- Adam Beach as Blue Duck
- James Rebhorn as Governor Elisha Pease
- Jake Busey as Tudwal
- Melanie Lynskey as Pearl Coleman
- Sal Lopez as Ahumado
- Norbert Leo Butz as Captain Richard King
- Indira Varma as Therese Wanz
- Floyd Westerman as First Old Comanche
- Kristine Sutherland as Elmira Forsythe
- Rachel Griffiths as Inez Scull
- David Midthunder as Famous Shoes
- Toby Metcalf as Ranger Lee Hitch
- Troy Baker as "Pea Eye" Parker
- Jeremy Ratchford as Charles Goodnight
- Brad Johnson as Colonel Tom Soult
- Rod Rondeaux as SlowTree
- Buck Taylor as Ben Lily

== Production ==
As with others in the Lonesome Dove series, the teleplay was co-written by author Larry McMurtry and Diana Ossana. It was directed by Simon Wincer, with the music directed by Lennie Niehaus.

=== Historical accuracy ===
Events such as the shooting of the chieftains (ahistorical, but based on the Council House Fight), the attack on Austin (ahistorical, but based on the Great Raid of 1840), and the rescue of the white woman (historical, based on Cynthia Ann Parker) were all included in the series, although actual timelines or events were altered.

== Reception ==
The series received lukewarm reviews from critics. Common complaints were the clownish portrayal of the Texas Rangers, who were continually drunk on duty and tumbling into bed with beautiful women under the slightest pretext, the negative stereotyping of the Mexican characters, who were largely portrayed as unwashed wild-eyed drooling killers superstitiously worshiping long-vanished Aztec gods, and the simplistic portrayal of frontier women, who were either weak-willed, simpering victims or cruel and manipulative Gorgons. Brian Lowry from Variety called it "tedious, at times cartoonishly bad".

Filmink argued Kilmer "stole all the reviews, in admittedly the flashiest role."

== Home media ==
It was released in Region 1 on DVD on February 26, 2008 by Sony Pictures Home Entertainment.
