= Streets of Laredo (novel) =

1993 novel by Larry McMurtry

- First edition cover
- Author: Larry McMurtry
- Language: English
- Series: Lonesome Dove series
- Genre: Western
- Publisher: Simon & Schuster
- Publication date: 1993
- Publication place: United States
- Media type: Print (Hardback & Paperback)
- Pages: 589
- ISBN: 0-671-79281-4
- OCLC: 40347807
- Preceded by: Lonesome Dove
- Followed by: Dead Man's Walk

Streets of Laredo is a 1993 Western novel by American writer Larry McMurtry. It is the second book published in the Lonesome Dove series, but the fourth and final book chronologically. It was adapted into a television miniseries in 1995.

== Introduction ==
The book follows the adventures of Captain Woodrow F. Call as he tracks a Mexican bandit who is preying on the railroad. It was later made into a television miniseries of the same name starring James Garner as Captain Call. Streets of Laredo takes its name from a famous cowboy ballad. The title was originally used by Larry McMurtry for a screenplay that he wrote with Peter Bogdanovich, but which never materialized as a movie. He then rewrote it as the original Lonesome Dove.

=== Between Lonesome Dove and Streets of Laredo ===
Between the events of the two books, quite a bit has happened. Lorena, lover of Gus McCrae, has left Clara and married Pea Eye Parker, of the former Hat Creek Outfit. They have several children, and own a farm in the Texas Panhandle. Pea Eye is thoroughly devoted to Lorena, and Lorena has learned to reciprocate and become almost equally attached to Pea Eye. Lorena teaches in a nearby schoolhouse. The cattle ranch (set up by the Hat Creek outfit in Montana) has collapsed. Newt is dead, fallen on by the Hell Bitch. Call has finally admitted to himself that Newt was his son. July Johnson is dead, and Clara lives alone. Call has gone back to being a Ranger and a gun-for-hire. Trains have greatly expanded the reach of civilization and have pushed back the frontier. The American West is no longer rough and tumble, and Captain Woodrow F. Call has become a relic, albeit a greatly respected one. Nineteen-year-old Joey Garza and his deadly German rifle (capable of killing a man at a distance of half a mile) are not about to let law and order close the book on the Wild West just yet.

== Plot summary ==
=== Part I: A Salaried Man ===
The book opens with former Ranger Captain Woodrow F. Call (now a bounty hunter) and Ned Brookshire, the "salaried man" of the title. Brookshire has been sent to Texas from New York City by his boss, railroad tycoon Colonel Terry, to contract Call's services in apprehending a bandit. The bandit in question is a young Mexican named Joey Garza, who has cost Terry significant business and money through his deadly train robberies. Brookshire is surprised that the old man he encounters has such a reputation, though he notes that Call does have a rather dangerous and respect-demanding aura about him. Brookshire himself does not strike a particularly imposing figure, and soon proves not to be cut out for train or horse travel, inexperienced in the ways of the west or violence, and very homesick for his bossy but loving wife, Katie. Call, on the other hand, is the very picture of experience. Though he is old and seems almost to have trouble lifting his foot into the stirrups, his reputation speaks for him. He has spent forty years on the border and the frontier, many of those with his more talkative but equally respected late partner, Gus McCrae. Protecting settlers in innumerable skirmishes with hostile Indians, rustlers, and dangerous gangs has earned him a great deal of respect and a reputation that generally strikes fear into the hearts of criminals.

Family is a focal point of McMurtry's book, with the emphasis on two very different families. One is that of Pea Eye Parker, Call's corporal, a fellow former-ranger who assists Call in his bounty-hunter duties. Pea Eye is now married to Lorena Wood (Lorie), the heroine of Lonesome Dove and now a school teacher and mother of five. Pea Eye is increasingly pressured by his wife and children to stop following the captain in pursuit of bandits, but his loyalty and devotion to Call usually prevails. Though he initially refuses to accompany Call and Brookshire in the hunt for Joey Garza, his guilt wins out, and he soon sets out after Call, accompanied by the celebrated Kickapoo tracker, Famous Shoes. The second family that dominates the plot of Streets of Laredo is the family of Joey Garza. Joey's mother, Maria, is the midwife of a small Mexican village on the Rio Grande. She has had a string of brief, failed marriages and has three children, of which Joey is the oldest. Of the other two, her daughter, Teresa, is blind from birth, while her other, Rafael, is very slow.

One of Maria's husbands sold Joey to the Apache Indians as a slave when he was a small boy; by the time he came back to Maria and her family, he was a bitter, angry, silent boy who was obsessed with killing and stealing (unknown to Maria, Joey killed her third husband, the only one who was kind to her or her children). Joey possesses a fine German rifle with a telescopic sight, which enables him to shoot his victims from a half-mile away. At the outset of the novel, Joey is hiding out in Crow Town, an outlaw village deep in the borderland desert. One of the other notorious denizens of Crow Town is the legendary Texas gunfighter, John Wesley Hardin. Maria travels by horse to Crow Town to warn Joey that Call is on his trail. Joey disappears, stealing his mother's horse, and rides to Langtry, Texas, where he shoots and hangs Judge Roy Bean, the "Law West of the Pecos".

=== Part II: The Manburner ===
As Call and Brookshire search for Joey Garza, they discover he is not the only outlaw preying on the railroad. A string of strange murders soon leads Call to pursue a ghost from the past — Mox Mox (or, as the Apache call him, "The Snake You Do Not See"). A former flunky of Blue Duck, of Lonesome Dove fame, Mox Mox is known for burning his captives alive. Mox Mox was thought to have been killed years before but had just been in hiding at sea and has now returned to the head of a murderous gang. The news is especially traumatic for Lorie, who herself had nearly been burned by the villain while she was a captive of Blue Duck. Fearing for the lives of her children, Lorie sends them to Nebraska, to the protection of her friend Clara Allen. She then sets off to find Pea Eye to warn him. Pea Eye and the Kickapoo Famous Shoes, unaware of the threat of Mox Mox, continue south to find Captain Call. They are thrown into the Presidio jail when the sheriff accuses Famous Shoes of being a horse thief (he came across Famous Shoes eating a dead horse several years ago and decided that it was stolen) and decides to hang him. Captain Call hears of their plight and frees them from jail (nearly killing the sheriff in the process with a furious beating) and continues in pursuit of Mox Mox. He ambushes the gang just as they are about to burn two children alive, killing outright all but two — Quick Jimmy, a renegade Cherokee, who escapes unscathed, and Mox Mox himself, who limps off to die.

=== Part III: Maria's Children ===
After rescuing Pea Eye and Famous Shoes from the corrupt bordertown sheriff, Call and his gang close in on Joey Garza. Ned Brookshire is killed in a scuffle; the anticipated confrontation between Call and Joey leaves Call seriously wounded; Lorie must amputate a leg to save him. The Mexican bandit is instead shot and mortally wounded by Pea Eye. Garza then drags himself back to his native village and attempts to kill his younger siblings, Teresa and Rafael, for whom he has long reserved his greatest hatred. Maria, the mother of the three children, attempts to stop Joey; he stabs her. A local villager then shoots Joey dead. Maria dies from her wounds, and at her request, Pea Eye and Lorie adopt Maria's two surviving children, returning with them to their farm. Call, crippled and no longer able to pursue bandits, goes to live with them. He becomes increasingly attached to Teresa, Maria's blind daughter, demonstrating for the first time an attachment to anyone besides Gus McCrae and, perhaps, secretly, his son Newt.

== Characters in Streets of Laredo ==
- Captain Woodrow F. Call
- Pea Eye Parker
- Lorena Wood (Parker)
- Clara Allen
- Ned Brookshire
- Joey Garza
- Mox Mox
- Famous Shoes
- Charles Goodnight
- Judge Roy Bean
- John Wesley Hardin
- Ben Lilly
- Maria

== Reception ==
Streets of Laredo received mostly positive reviews. Critic Michiko Kakutani of The New York Times described the book as "sad, funny elegy not only for his characters' pasts, but for the waning of the American West." Also writing for The Times, Noel Perrin criticized the novel as including several hard-to-believe scenes.

== Adaptation ==
The novel was adapted into a television miniseries starring James Garner replacing Tommy Lee Jones (from the Lonesome Dove miniseries) as Captain Woodrow F. Call, Sissy Spacek replacing Diane Lane as Lorena, and Sam Shepard replacing Timothy Scott as Pea Eye. Also featured were Randy Quaid as John Wesley Hardin, Ned Beatty as Judge Roy Bean, Wes Studi as Famous Shoes, Charles Martin Smith as Ned Brookshire, George Carlin as Billy Williams, Alexis Cruz as Joey Garza, Kevin Conway as Mox Mox, James Gammon as Charles Goodnight, and Sonia Braga as Maria Garza.

== In popular culture ==
Streets of Laredo appeared in the 2017 television episodes "Goodwill" and "Search" of American television series Halt and Catch Fire.
