= Contrabando =

Ghost town in Texas, United States

- Location within Texas Location within the United States
- Location: Chihuahuan Desert, Presidio / Brewster, Texas, United States
- Coordinates: 29°16′46″N 103°50′28″W
- Operator: Texas Parks and Wildlife
- Website: Texas Parks and Wildlife Website

The Contrabando is a vacant and artificial ghost town used as a filming location within the Big Bend Ranch State Park, 9.5 miles (15.3 km) west of Lajitas, Texas, between Texas State Highway 170 and the Rio Grande, the international border with Mexico.

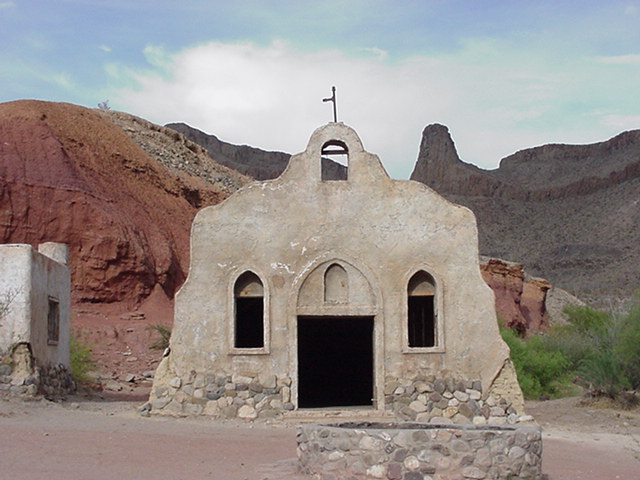
The church from the movie set

The Contrabando consists of an original adobe building called 'La Casita' and several later additions that became part of the Contrabando during its use as a movie set. The movie set was constructed in 1985 for the Roy Clark film Uphill all the Way. The site has been used as a set for nine movies including John Sayles' 1996 movie Lone Star; as well as Dead Man's Walk and Streets of Laredo, which were part of the Lonesome Dove miniseries based upon the novel by Larry McMurtry.

In September 2008, heavy rains and flooding occurred in Ojinaga, Mexico. The rain, and the ensuing release of water from local flood control structures, caused widespread flooding, and resulted in damage to the movie set buildings at the Contrabando. The original Casita was not damaged. In 2015, the buildings, except for the Casita, were removed for safety reasons.
