= Suzanne de Passe =

American film producer (born 1946)

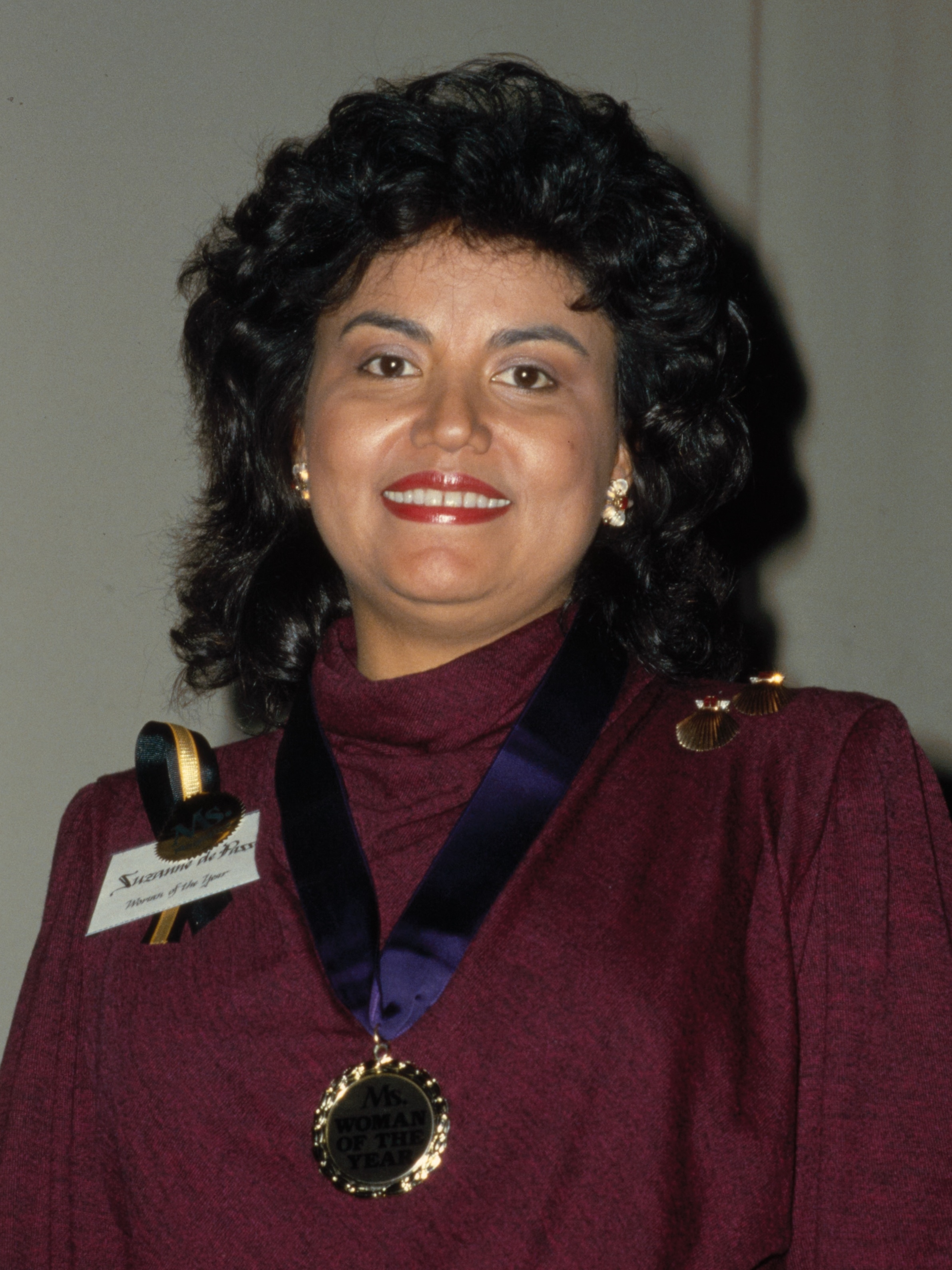
- De Passe in 1986
- Born: July 19, 1946 (age 80) or July 19, 1947 (age 79) or July 19, 1948 (age 78) (sources differ); New York City, U.S.
- Education: Syracuse University
- Occupations: Executive producer; chairwoman; television producer; businesswoman; screenwriter
- Years active: 1966–present
- Notable work: The Temptations; The Jacksons: An American Dream; Sister, Sister; Lady Sings the Blues
- Spouse: Paul Le Mat (m. 1978; div. 1994)
- Children: 3
- Website: depassejones.com

Suzanna Celeste de Passe (born July 19, 1946, 1947 or 1948) is an American businesswoman, television, music and film producer. De Passe serves as the co-chairwoman of de Passe Jones Entertainment Group.

== Early life and education ==
De Passe was born in New York City to a Harlem born mother of Jamaican descent and a father of Haitian and French descent. Raised in Harlem, De Passe attended New Lincoln School and graduated from Syracuse University in 1968.

== Career ==
De Passe began her career in show business at the Cheetah nightclub in New York City. Through her friendship with Cindy Birdsong, who replaced Florence Ballard as a member of the Supremes in 1967, she began working at Motown as creative assistant to company founder Berry Gordy. Early in her career, de Passe developed the Jackson 5's wardrobe and the act they took on the road. She was instrumental in taking the record label to television with a host of notable specials, including Motown 25: Yesterday, Today, Forever produced while she was president of Motown Productions. When Motown was sold, she partnered with her mentor in Gordy/de Passe Productions and subsequently established de Passe Entertainment in 1992. De Passe's association with Gordy was featured in the December 2008 issue of Vanity Fair: Motown the Untold Story, The Labels Greatest Legends, In Their Own Words with photography by Annie Leibovitz.

The subject of two Harvard Business School case studies: "Suzanne de Passe and Motown Productions" and "de Passe Entertainment", de Passe has lectured at the Harvard Business School on several occasions. In 2002, de Passe was named Time Warner Visiting Professor to the Department of Radio, Television and Film at Howard University's John H. Johnson School of Communications, a post she held for the requisite 3 years. During Howard University's 138th Charter Day celebration in March 2006, de Passe received an honorary doctorate degree of Doctor of Humanities. De Passe is currently serving as the Producer-in-Residence at Emerson College, School of the Arts in Boston. She also served as the Emerson College 2007 Balfour Distinguished Lecturer. De Passe served as executive producer of the half-hour situation comedies Sister, Sister and Smart Guy, both of which aired on The WB and were produced in association with Paramount and Disney Television, respectively.

From 2002 until 2008, de Passe served as executive producer of Showtime at the Apollo, a weekly variety program nationally syndicated by Warner Brother/Telepictures. In 2005 and 2006 she co-created, wrote, and executive produced the Black Movie Awards for TNT. Currently, she is developing King, a film on the life of Rev. Dr. Martin Luther King Jr. In 2009, De Passe was featured in HBO's The Black List: Vol. 2. This is the second installment of the documentary including other prominent African Americans such as filmmaker Tyler Perry, Massachusetts Governor Deval Patrick, and Pastor T.D. Jakes.

In 2024, de Passe was selected for induction into the Rock and Roll Hall of Fame with the Ahmet Ertegun Award category for non-performers.

== Personal Life ==
Suzanne de Passe and actor Paul Le Mat were married in August 1978 at St. Alban's Church with a reception at the Beverly Hills Hotel. Diana Ross was matron of honor. Guests included Ross' daughters, Tracee, Chudney and Rhonda. Other guests included Lauren Hutton, Red Buttons, Marisa Berenson and Sue Mengers.

The couple had three daughters before divorcing in 1994.

== Filmography ==
=== Miniseries ===
- The Temptations, NBC, four hours, 1998, de Passe Entertainment. NAACP Image Award Winner for Best Miniseries. (Nominated for six Emmy Awards, including Best Mini-Series and won an Emmy for Best Director.) Also nominated for a Golden Globe and won the Producers Guild Award; Directors Guild Award; and Prism Award. Starring: Leon, Charles Malik Whitfield, DB Woodside, Terron Brooks and Christian Payton.
- Dead Man's Walk (miniseries), ABC, five hours, 1996, de Passe Entertainment. Starring: Edward James Olmos, Keith Carradine, Brian Dennehy and F. Murray Abraham.
- Buffalo Girls, CBS, four hours, 1995, de Passe Entertainment. Nominated for eleven Emmy Awards, including Best Miniseries and Best Actress. Starring Anjelica Huston, Melanie Griffith, Reba McEntire, Sam Elliott and Jack Palance.
- Streets of Laredo, CBS, five hours, 1995, de Passe Entertainment. Starring: James Garner, Sissy Spacek, Sam Shepard and Sonia Braga.
- Return to Lonesome Dove, CBS, four hours, 1993, Motown Productions. Starring: Jon Voight, Barbara Hershey, Rick Schroder and Louis Gossett Jr. and William Petersen.
- The Jacksons: An American Dream, ABC, five hours, 1992, Motown Productions. Nominated for multiple Emmy Awards, including Best Miniseries. Starring: Angela Bassett, Billy Dee Williams, and Vanessa Williams as Suzanne.
- Lonesome Dove, CBS, eight hours, 1989, Motown Productions. Emmy, Golden Globe, Peabody Award-winning miniseries. Named “Outstanding Program of the Year” by Television Critics Association, Best Miniseries in TV Guide Annual Readers Choice Awards, D.W. Griffith Award by National Board of Review. Among other honors, the success of this landmark western resulted in de Passe's induction into the Cowboy Hall of Fame. “Lonesome Dove” was based on Larry McMurtry's Pulitzer Prize-winning novel. Starring: Robert Duvall, Tommy Lee Jones and Anjelica Huston.
- Small Sacrifices, ABC, four hours, 1989, Motown Productions. Nominated for three Emmy Awards, including Best Miniseries and two Golden Globe Awards. Winner of the Peabody Award. Based on Ann Rule's best-selling book. Starring: Farrah Fawcett, Ryan O’Neal and John Shea.

=== Series ===
- Producer King: The upcoming DreamWorks motion picture on the life of Martin Luther King Jr. with Steven Spielberg and Madison Jones.
- Executive Producer, the upcoming series, Becoming KK Jones, Fox Television Network
- Executive Producer, Life Changers television series with superstar music producer, Rodney Jerkins (Lady Gaga, Beyoncé)
- Producer, Humpty Dumpty

=== Television movies ===
==== Network ====
- The Loretta Claiborne Story – Two-hour, 2000, Disney/ABC Sunday Night, de Passe Entertainment.
- Someone Else's Child – Two-hour, 1998, ABC, de Passe Entertainment.
- The Last Electric Knight – (AKA Sidekicks) – Two-hour, 1989, ABC, Motown Productions.
- Bridemaids – Two-hour, 1989, CBS, Motown Productions.
- Happy Endings – Two-hour, 1983, CBS, King Entertainment, Motown Productions.

==== Cable ====
- Zenon: Z3 – Two-hour, 2004, The Disney Channel, de Passe Entertainment.
- Zenon: The Zequel – Two-hour, 2001, The Disney Channel, de Passe Entertainment. When it aired, the movie had the highest-ever rating for a Disney Channel original movie. Premiered January 2001 with 3.3 rating/6 share.
- Cheaters – Two-hour, 2000, HBO Films, de Passe Entertainment.
- Zenon: Girl of the 21st Century – Two-hour, 1999, The Disney Channel, de Passe Entertainment.

==== Specials ====
- Executive Producer, Commander In Chief's Inaugural Ball for President Barack Obama.
- 70th Anniversary Tribute to the Apollo Theatre: Two-hour, 2004, NBC, de Passe Entertainment.
- Motown 40: The Music is Forever, Four-hour documentary 1998, ABC, de Passe Entertainment. Executive Producer & Writer.
- Motown 30: What's Goin' On, Two-hour, 1990, CBS, Motown Productions, and Emmy Award Nominee. Executive Producer & Writer.
- Motown: Merri X-Mas, One-hour, 1987, ABC, Motown Productions.
- Motown Returns to the Apollo, Three-hour, 1985, NBC, Motown Productions. Emmy Award winner for best variety Program. NAACP Image Award winner. Executive Producer & Writer.
- Motown 25: Yesterday, Today, Forever, Two-hour, 1983, NBC, Motown Productions, Emmy Award winner for best variety program. Winner of NAACP Image Award and Peabody Award. Executive Producer & Writer.
- Motown on Showtime: – Smokey Robinson – One-hour, 1990, Showtime, Motown Productions. – Comedy on Campus – One-hour, 990, Showtime, Motown Productions. – Michael Jackson – One-hour, 1988, Showtime, Motown Productions. – Marvin Gaye – One-hour, 1987, Showtime, Motown Productions. – Temptations and Four Tops – One-hour, 1986, Showtime, Motown Productions

==== Series ====
- Sister, Sister: Half-hour sitcom – 122 episodes completed, 1995–1999, ABC/The WB, de Passe Entertainment. Starring: Tia and Tamera Mowry, Tim Reid and Jackee Harry.
- Smart Guy: Half-hour sitcom – 51 episodes completed, 1996–1999, The WB, de Passe Entertainment. Starring: Tahj Mowry, John Marshall Jones, Jason Weaver, Omar Gooding and Essence Atkins.
- On Our Own: Half-hour sitcom – 20 episodes completed, 1994–1995, ABC, de Passe Entertainment. Starring: The Smollet Family.
- The Motown Revue starring Smokey Robinson: Six one-hour episodes, 1986, NBC, Motown Productions. Starring: Smokey Robinson.

==== First-run syndication ====
- Showtime at the Apollo: 130 one-hour episodes completed, variety program format. 2002–Present. Syndicated through Warner Brothers/Telepictures.
- Lonesome Dove, The Outlaw Years: 44 one-hour episodes completed, western drama, 1994-1996. Starring: Eric McCormack, Scott Bairstow and Paul Le Mat.
- Night Life: (195) half-hour episodes, talk show. 1986-87. Hosted by David Brenner.

==== Award programs ====
- 2006 Black Movie Awards: A Celebration of Black Cinema: Past, Present, & Future. A 90-minute special which aired nationally on Turner Network Television (TNT) October 18, 2006. Hosted by Tyler Perry
- 2005 Black Movie Awards: A Celebration of Black Cinema: Past, Present, & Future. A 90-minute special which aired nationally on Turner Network Television (TNT) October 19, 2005. Hosted by Cedric the Entertainer
- 34th NAACP Image Awards, Two-hour special, 2003 FOX, de Passe Entertainment. Hosted by Cedric the Entertainer.
- 2003 Essence Awards, Two-hour special, FOX, de Passe Entertainment.
- 2002 Essence Awards, Two-hour special, FOX, de Passe Entertainment. Hosted by Steve Harvey
- 33rd NAACP Image Awards, Two-hour special, 2002, FOX, de Passe Entertainment. Hosted by Chris Tucker
- 32nd NAACP Image Awards, Two-hour special, 2001, FOX, de Passe Entertainment. Hosted by Chris Tucker
- MUSIC and MORE...Image Awards, One-hour special, 2001, WB, de Passe Entertainment. Hosted by Sinbad and Brandy.

== Awards ==
De Passe received an Academy Award nomination for co-writing the screenplay Lady Sings the Blues, making her the first person of color to be nominated for Best Original Screenplay. De Passe also won two Emmy Awards and NAACP Image Awards as executive producer of Motown 25: Yesterday, Today, Forever and Motown Returns to the Apollo. De Passe served as executive producer for the CBS western miniseries Lonesome Dove, that won both Golden Globe and Peabody Awards and was voted "Outstanding Program of the Year" by the Television Critics Association.

As executive producer of the benchmark NBC miniseries The Temptations, de Passe won the NAACP Image Award for Outstanding Miniseries and was nominated for both the Golden Globe Award and Emmy Award for Best Miniseries. She also served as Executive Producer for Small Sacrifices, The Jacksons: An American Dream and Buffalo Girls, all of which were nominated for the Emmy Award for Best Miniseries.

De Passe has also received countless awards for her contributions to the television, movie and music industries including:

- Essence: Hollywood Women of Power Visionary Award (2008)
- Savannah Film Festival Lifetime Achievement Award (2008)
- Black Enterprise Top 50 Hollywood Power Brokers (2007)
- The AWRT (American Women in Radio and Television) Silver Satellite Award (1999);
- Revlon Business Woman of the Year Award (1994);
- Inducted into the Black Filmmakers Hall of Fame (1990);
- Essence Award (1989); and
- Women in Film Crystal Award for outstanding women who, through their endurance and the excellence of their work, have helped to expand the role of women within the entertainment industry. (1988).
- Candace Award, National Coalition of 100 Black Women, 1983 and 1989

Recent community honors include:

- 2010 Recipient The George Arents Award is Syracuse University's highest alumni honor, presented annually to alumni who have made outstanding contributions to their chosen fields.
- Center for The Advancement of Women: 2007 Changing the Landscape for Women Honoree
- Jackie Robinson Foundation 2006 Trailblazer Award
- Ebony Magazine selected de Passe for its highest honor, presenting her with the 2004 Madame C. J. Walker Award
- 2003 Whitney M. Young Award; Los Angeles Urban League's highest accolade. (In keeping with tradition, de Passe presented the 2004 award to Magic Johnson.)

== Boards, trade associations and affiliations ==
- Academy of Motion Picture Arts and Sciences, Member
- Alpha Kappa Alpha sorority, Honorary Member
- American Federation of Television and Radio Artists, Member
- American Film Institute, Trustee
- American Society of Composers and Publishers, Member
- Caucus of Writers, Producers and Directors, Executive Committee
- Debbie Allen Dance Academy, Board Member
- Humanities Prize, Board Member
- Los Angeles Chamber of Commerce, Former Board Member
- Los Angeles Opera, Board Member
- National Association of Recording Arts and Sciences, Member
- National Association of Television Arts and Sciences, Member
- New York City Ballet, Former Board Member
- Producers Guild of America, Member
- Writers Guild of America, Member

Additionally, she has appeared as a speaker before numerous businesses and industry trade groups, including:

- Miller Brewing Company; Black Entertainment and Sports Lawyers Association.
- Burger King Franchise Owners Association
- Chicago Minority Business Development Council.
