= Timothy Scott (actor, born 1937) =

American actor (1937–1995)

Tom Harmon (July 20, 1937 – June 14, 1995), credited as Timothy Scott or Tim Scott, was an American actor.

== Personal life ==
Scott was born in Detroit, Michigan, lived in New Mexico, and moved to Los Angeles, California, in 1959 for his acting career. He had a wife Donna Leigh Scott, one stepdaughter Marisa Scott-Windom, and two sons, Scott Harmon and Dean Swope. Scott co-founded the Met Theatre with James Gammon in Los Angeles. He lived in Woodland Hills where he was undergoing treatment for lung cancer.

== Career ==
Scott appeared in nearly two dozen films and television series, including many westerns. He portrayed Texas Ranger turned cowboy Pea Eye Parker in the 1989 miniseries Lonesome Dove and its 1993 sequel Return to Lonesome Dove. He was replaced by Sam Shepard as Pea Eye in Streets of Laredo (1995). He also appeared in films such as Butch Cassidy and the Sundance Kid (1969), as drifter Smokey Lonesome in Fried Green Tomatoes (1991), Vanishing Point (1971), and The Electric Horseman (1979), and television, like 1966 series Batman and miniseries Ned Blessing: The True Story of My Life.

== Death ==
Scott was diagnosed with advanced lung cancer in 1994. He died of a heart attack in a Los Angeles hospital at age 57 in June 1995 where he was receiving cancer treatment. Scott was commemorated in Los Angeles and Texas. He was cremated, his ashes scattered at screenwriter Bill Wittliff's ranch, Plum Creek, located between two Texas cities, Luling and Gonzales.

== Selected filmography ==
Main sources:

- In the Heat of the Night (1967)
- The Party (1968), Gore Pontoon
- Butch Cassidy and the Sundance Kid (1969), William "News" Carver
- Vanishing Point (1971), Angel
- Macon County Line (1974), Shagbag
- The Electric Horseman (1979), Leroy
- Roots: The Next Generations (1979), Mr. Peacock
- Blood Feud (1983), Ohlmeyer
- Footloose (1984), Andy Beamis
- Lonesome Dove (1989), "Pea Eye" Parker
- Chattahoochee (1989), Harley
- Fried Green Tomatoes (1991), Smokey Lonesome
- Ned Blessing: The Story of My Life and Times (1992), Deputy Sticks Packwood
- Return to Lonesome Dove (1993), "Pea Eye" Parker
