= Dead Man's Walk =

1995 novel by Larry McMurtry

- First edition cover
- Author: Larry McMurtry
- Language: English
- Series: Lonesome Dove series
- Genre: Western
- Publisher: Simon & Schuster
- Publication date: September 1995
- Publication place: United States
- Media type: Print (Hardback & Paperback)
- Pages: 488 (hardback and paperback edition)
- ISBN: 0-684-80753-X
- OCLC: 32625743
- Dewey Decimal: 813/.54 20
- LC Class: PS3563.A319 D38 1995
- Preceded by: Streets of Laredo
- Followed by: Comanche Moon

Dead Man's Walk is a 1995 Western novel by American writer Larry McMurtry. It is the third book published in the Lonesome Dove series but the first installment in terms of chronology. McMurtry wrote a fourth segment to the Lonesome Dove chronicle, Comanche Moon, which describes the events of the central characters' lives between Dead Man's Walk and Lonesome Dove. The second novel in the Lonesome Dove series was the 1993 sequel to the original, called Streets of Laredo. Dead Man's Walk was later adapted into a three-part miniseries of the same name, which aired in May 1996.

== Plot summary ==
In 1842, young Texas Rangers Augustus McCrae and Woodrow Call are introduced quickly and brutally to the rangering life on their first expedition, in which they are stalked by the Comanche war chief Buffalo Hump. After a narrow escape, the rangers return to civilization, only to quickly join an expedition to capture and annex Santa Fe, part of New Mexico (the part east of the Rio Grande) for Texas. The expedition, led by pirate and soldier of fortune Caleb Cobb, is ultimately a failure; of the 200 initial adventurers, only about 40 survive, falling to starvation, bears and Comanches, only to be swiftly arrested by the Mexican authorities. Those survivors are forced to march the Jornada del Muerto ("Dead Man's Walk") to El Paso, and many, Mexican and Texan alike, die along the journey. The Texas contingent is reduced to ten persons when the captives panic after they observe cavalry drilling and are slaughtered in a blood lust as they flee. At their destination, the ten are forced to gamble for their lives by drawing a bean from a jar - a white bean signals life, a black bean death. Call and McCrae are among the five survivors. The last Rangers then return to Texas, escorting a Scottish woman and her son, who have also been held captive by the Mexicans, as well as an African woman the Comanches fear as she is thought to be a feared dark woman on a white horse who will ensure the Comanches' downfall.

== Characters ==
- Augustus McCrae – Texas Ranger
- Woodrow Call – Texas Ranger
- William "Long Bill" Coleman – Texas Ranger
- Johnny Carthage – Texas Ranger
- Colonel Caleb Cobb – pirate who leads the Texas-Santa Fe expedition
- Bigfoot Wallace – Texas Ranger scout
- Shadrach – Texas Ranger scout
- Matilda Roberts – whore, also known as "The Great Western"
- Captain Salazar – Mexican Army captain who takes the Texas prisoners in New Mexico
- Major Laroche – Frenchman in the Mexican Army, who takes the prisoners to the leper colony
- Buffalo Hump – a notorious Comanche war chief and father of Blue Duck
- Kicking Wolf – Comanche warrior, accomplished horse thief
- Clara Forsythe – young lady in a general store in Austin, who 'smites' Gus
- Lady Lucinda Carey – Scottish nobility, leper
- Willy – Lady Carey's son
- Mrs. Chubb – Lady Carey's attendant
- Emerald – Lady Carey's African attendant
- Maggie Tilton – a prostitute who loves Woodrow F. Call and the mother of his illegitimate son Newt.

== Background ==
Dead Man's Walk details the earliest adventures of the young Woodrow F. Call and Augustus McCrae as they join up with the Texas Rangers on a fictional expedition based loosely on the historical Texan Santa Fe Expedition of 1841. Although the exact time frame of the story is not given, the historical context of the events occurring sometime in the early 1840s is authentic. The Republic of Texas did indeed attempt to annex part of New Mexico, in what historians refer to as the Texan Santa Fe Expedition. As seen in this story, it was a failure.

During the course of this book, three other familiar and important characters are introduced. At a general store, McCrae meets Clara Forsythe, later to marry Robert Allen and become Clara Allen, Augustus's old flame in the original novel. In the same town, Call meets a prostitute named Maggie, later to become the mother of his illegitimate son, Newt. On their journey, they are tracked by the notorious Comanche warrior Buffalo Hump, future father of Blue Duck, whom they will hunt during their later days as Texas Rangers. Call and Gus also briefly encounter a fictionalized version of Charles Goodnight, a rancher and future close friend of Call's in Streets of Laredo.

== Reception ==
Reviewing the book for The Philadelphia Inquirer, John Milius said: "What amazes continually in this book is McMurtry's understanding of the time and the land - how distant we are from it, how we protect ourselves from its truth and ultimately how strong and exciting that truth really is."

== Adaptations ==
In May 1996 it was screened on ABC as a two-part miniseries starring David Arquette as Augustus McCrae and Jonny Lee Miller as Woodrow F. Call.
