= Karl Urban =

New Zealand actor (born 1972)

- Urban in 2026
- Born: Karl-Heinz Urban; 7 June 1972 (age 54); Wellington, New Zealand
- Occupation: Actor
- Years active: 1990–present
- Spouse: Natalie Wihongi (m. 2004; sep. 2014)
- Children: 2

Karl-Heinz Urban (born 7 June 1972) is a New Zealand actor. His career began with appearances in New Zealand films and television series such as Xena: Warrior Princess. His first Hollywood role was in the 2002 horror film Ghost Ship. Since then, he has starred in many high-profile movies, including as Éomer in two films of The Lord of the Rings trilogy (2002–2003), Vaako in two films of the Riddick film series (2004–2013), Johnny Cage in Mortal Kombat II, Dr Leonard "Bones" McCoy in the Star Trek reboot film series (2009–2016), Kirill in The Bourne Supremacy (2004), John "Reaper" Grimm in Doom (2005), Judge Dredd in Dredd (2012), Gavin Magary in Pete's Dragon (2016), and Skurge in Marvel Studios' Thor: Ragnarok (2017). In 2013, he starred in the sci-fi series Almost Human. From 2019 to 2026, he starred as Billy Butcher in the satirical superhero series The Boys and voiced a character in the 2022 film The Sea Beast.

== Early life ==
Urban was born on 7 June 1972 in Wellington, New Zealand. His father, a German immigrant, owned a leather goods store, and his mother once worked for Film Facilities in Wellington. Through his mother, the young Urban was exposed to classic New Zealand cinema and developed an interest in the film industry. Urban attended St Mark's Church School, where he showed an early love for public performance. His first acting role came at age eight, when he had a single line in one episode of the New Zealand television series Pioneer Woman. Though continuing to take part in school stage productions, he did not act professionally again until after high school.

He attended Wellington College in 1986–1990. He then enrolled at Victoria University of Wellington in the Bachelor of Arts programme but left after one year to pursue a career in acting. Over the next few years, he appeared in several local TV commercials in addition to theatre roles in the Wellington area. Eventually, he moved to Auckland where he was offered many guest roles in TV shows (one of which was playing a heroin addict in the police drama Shark in the Park). Urban then moved briefly to Bondi Beach, Sydney, Australia in 1995 before returning to New Zealand the following year.

== Career ==
Urban's first Hollywood role was in the 2002 horror film Ghost Ship. Since then, he has worked on many high-profile movies, including the second and third installments of The Lord of the Rings trilogy (The Two Towers and The Return of the King) as Éomer, The Bourne Supremacy (as Russian Federal Security Service agent Kirill), The Chronicles of Riddick, Star Trek and Doom. The Hollywood Reporter speculated that Urban was one of several actors being considered for the part of British secret service agent James Bond in Casino Royale, directed by fellow New Zealander Martin Campbell.

Urban played John "Reaper" Grimm in Universal Pictures' Doom (based on the first-person shooter video game Doom), which was released on 21 October 2005. In 2007, he starred in the Viking adventure Pathfinder. A longtime fan of Westerns, he starred as Woodrow Call in Comanche Moon, a television miniseries that aired in early 2008 as a prequel to the Lonesome Dove miniseries based on Larry McMurtry's book series of the same name.

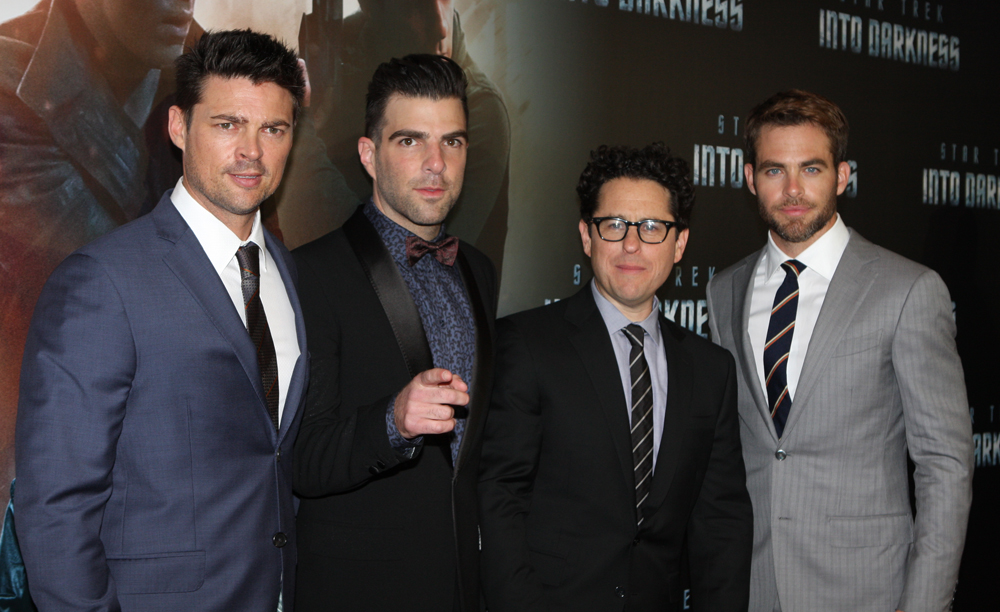
Urban, Zachary Quinto, J. J. Abrams, and Chris Pine, at the Star Trek Into Darkness movie premiere in Sydney, Australia in April 2013

In the 2009 film Star Trek, he played Dr. Leonard "Bones" McCoy, a role originated by DeForest Kelley in the original Star Trek TV series. A fan of the Star Trek franchise since childhood, Urban actively pursued a role in the film. His performance was widely embraced by the Star Trek fan community for its faithfulness to the spirit of Kelley's McCoy. Urban reprised the role in the 2013 film Star Trek Into Darkness and the 2016 film Star Trek Beyond.

Urban next appeared as CIA agent William Cooper in Red, adapted from the graphic novel of the same name and co-starring Bruce Willis and Helen Mirren. He portrayed Black Hat, a villainous priest-turned-vampire, in the film adaptation of the Korean manhwa Priest, released in 3-D in 2011.

In 2012, Urban starred as law-enforcing comic book character Judge Dredd in the film Dredd. In an interview with Shave magazine, Urban described it as a "high-octane, action-fueled film... about the day in the life of Dredd". The film was directed by Pete Travis, with a script by Alex Garland. Though it underperformed at the box office, Dredd was well received by critics.

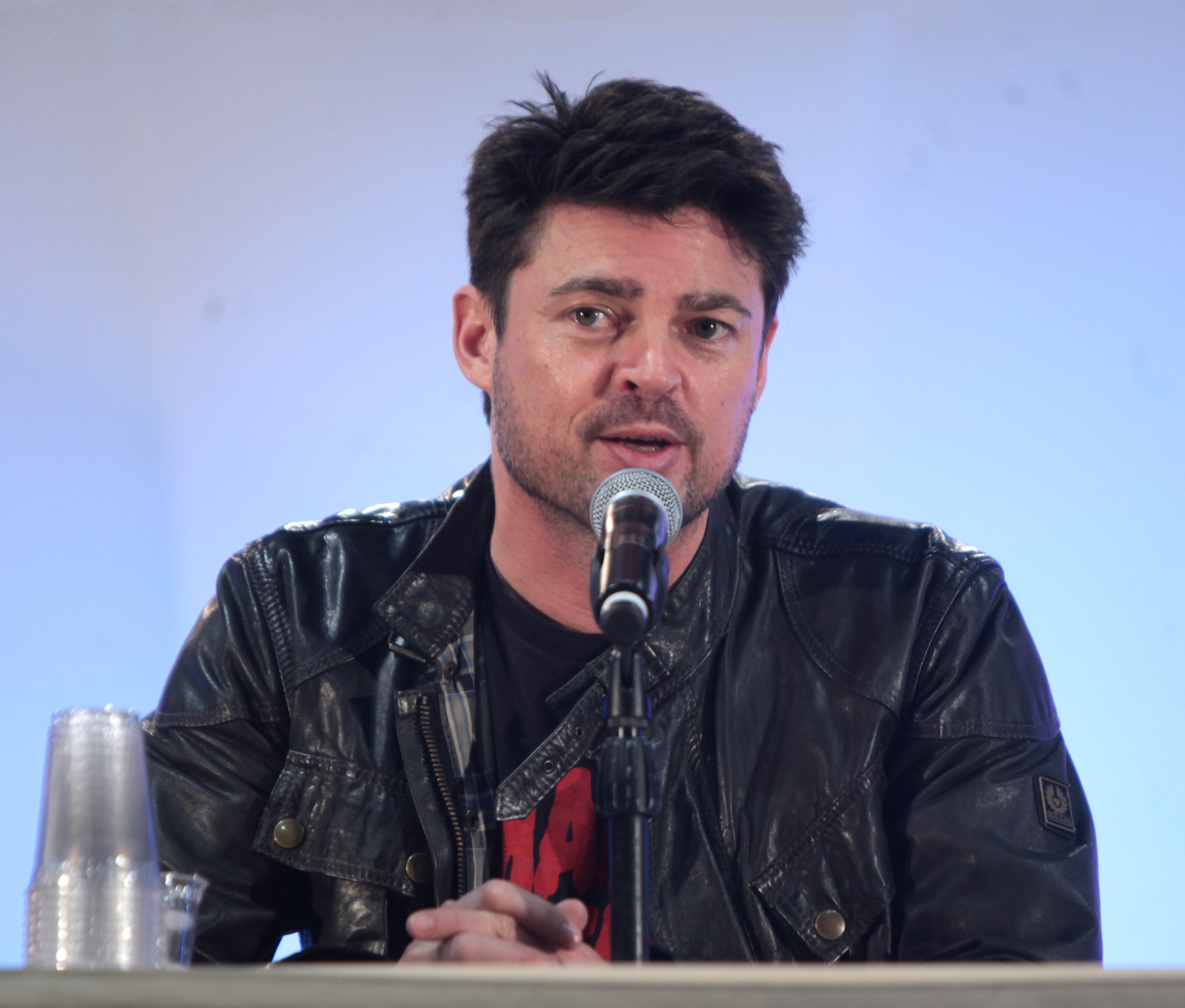
Urban at Phoenix Comicon in May 2015

In 2013, Urban starred as Detective John Kennex in Almost Human, a TV series created by J. H. Wyman. The series was set 35 years into the future when cops in the L.A.P.D. are paired up with lifelike androids. Urban played a detective who has a dislike for robots but ends up being teamed up with one with emotional feelings. Urban next appeared in the ensemble thriller The Loft, a remake of the Belgian film of the same name. It was filmed in New Orleans and Belgium by the director of the 2008 original, Erik Van Looy. In January 2015, Urban replaced Michael C. Hall as the main antagonist in the 2016 remake of Pete's Dragon. In 2017, he played Skurge in Thor: Ragnarok. Also in 2017, Urban played a psychotic cop in the action thriller Acts of Vengeance opposite Antonio Banderas and Robert Forster. Urban had a cameo as a stormtrooper in Star Wars: The Rise of Skywalker in 2019. He voiced the lead role in The Sea Beast in 2022.

Since 2019, Urban has starred as William "Billy" Butcher in the Amazon Prime Video series The Boys. He stars as Johnny Cage in the Mortal Kombat II film.

== Personal life ==
In September 2004, Urban married his longtime partner, Natalie Wihongi, who was his makeup artist for the 2000 television film The Privateers. Together they have two sons, Hunter and Indiana. His second son, Indy, was named for the eponymous hero of the Indiana Jones franchise, which he has stated is one of his favourite movie series. They lived in the Herne Bay area of Auckland, New Zealand. The couple separated in June 2014.

From 2014 to 2018, he was in a relationship with actress Katee Sackhoff.

== Philanthropy ==
Urban serves as a celebrity ambassador for KidsCan, a charity that currently supports over 16,000 disadvantaged children in New Zealand by providing them with essentials such as food, clothing, and shoes.

In May 2022, UNICEF Aotearoa New Zealand welcomed Urban as an official Ambassador to support in raising awareness on children's rights both in New Zealand and around the world.

On 1 June 2020, Urban was part of Josh Gad's YouTube series Reunited Apart which reunites the cast of popular movies through video-conferencing, and promotes donations to non-profit charities. Other contributors were Sean Astin, Sean Bean, Orlando Bloom, Billy Boyd, Ian McKellen, Dominic Monaghan, Viggo Mortensen, Miranda Otto, John Rhys-Davies, Andy Serkis, Liv Tyler, and Elijah Wood, plus writer Philippa Boyens and director Peter Jackson.

== Filmography ==
=== Film ===
Year	Title	Role	Notes
1992	Chunuk Bair	Wellington Soldier	
1998	Heaven	Sweeper	
1998	Via Satellite	Paul	
2000	The Irrefutable Truth about Demons	Harry Ballard	
2000	The Price of Milk	Rob	
2002	Ghost Ship	Daryl Munder	
2002	The Lord of the Rings: The Two Towers	Éomer	
2003	The Lord of the Rings: The Return of the King	Éomer	Broadcast Film Critics Association Award for Best Cast; Critics' Choice Movie Award for Best Acting Ensemble; National Board of Review Award for Best Cast; Screen Actors Guild Award for Outstanding Performance by a Cast in a Motion Picture; Nominated—Phoenix Film Critics Society Award for Best Cast
2004	The Chronicles of Riddick	Siberius Vaako	
2004	The Bourne Supremacy	Kirill	
2005	Doom	John "Reaper" Grimm	Nominated—Fangoria Chainsaw Award for Bloodiest Beatdown (with Dwayne Johnson)
2006	Out of the Blue	Nick Harvey	Won—Qantas Film and Television Award for Best Supporting Actor
2007	Pathfinder	Ghost	
2009	Star Trek	Leonard McCoy	Boston Society of Film Critics Award for Best Cast; Denver Film Critics Society Award for Best Cast; Nominated—Critics' Choice Movie Award for Best Acting Ensemble; Nominated—Washington D.C. Area Film Critics Association Award for Best Ensemble
2009	Black Water Transit	Earl Pike	
2010	And Soon the Darkness	Michael	
2010	Red	William Cooper	
2011	Priest	Black Hat	
2012	Dredd	Judge Dredd	
2013	Star Trek Into Darkness	Leonard McCoy	
2013	Riddick	Siberius Vaako	Cameo
2013	Walking with Dinosaurs	Zack	
2014	The Loft	Vincent Stevens	
2016	Star Trek Beyond	Leonard McCoy	
2016	Pete's Dragon	Gavin Magary	
2017	Thor: Ragnarok	Skurge the Executioner	
2017	Acts of Vengeance	Officer Hank Strode	
2017	Hangman	Detective Will Ruiney	
2018	Bent	Danny Gallagher	
2019	Star Wars: The Rise of Skywalker	Stormtrooper	Cameo
2020	Butcher: A Short Film	William "Billy" Butcher	Short film
2022	The Sea Beast	Jacob Holland	Voice role
2026	The Bluff	Capt. Francisco Connor	
2026	Mortal Kombat II	Johnny Cage	
2026	I, Object	Frank	Also producer

Key
†	Denotes films that have not yet been released

=== Television ===
Year	Title	Role	Notes
1990	Shark in the Park	Rohann Murdoch	6 episodes
1992	Homeward Bound	Tim Johnstone	Unknown episodes
1993	White Fang	David	Episode: "Tough Kid"
1993–1994	Shortland Street	Paramedic Jamie Forrest	Recurring
1995	Riding High	James Westwood	Unknown episodes
1996–1998	Hercules: The Legendary Journeys	Cupid; Julius Caesar	Episode: "The Green-Eyed Monster"; "Render Unto Caesar"
1996–2001	Xena: Warrior Princess	Mael	Episode: "Altared States" (season 1)
1996–2001	Xena: Warrior Princess	Julius Caesar	8 episodes (season 2–4, 6)
1996–2001	Xena: Warrior Princess	Cupid	2 episodes (season 2)
1996–2001	Xena: Warrior Princess	Kor	Episode: "Lifeblood" (season 5)
1997	Amazon High	Kor	Television film
2000	The Privateers	Captain Aran Dravyk	Television film
2008	Comanche Moon	Woodrow F. Call	Miniseries
2013–2014	Almost Human	John Kennex	13 episodes
2014	Short Poppies	Alex Turnbull	Episode: "Mary Ledbetter"
2019–2026	The Boys	William "Billy" Butcher	Lead role, 40 episodes. Also producer. Nominated—Best Actor in a Superhero Series, Critics' Choice Super Awards; Nominated—Best Actor in a Streaming Series, Drama, Hollywood Critics Association TV Awards
2023	Gen V	William "Billy" Butcher	Episode: "Guardians of Godolkin"
2024	Ark: The Animated Series	Bob	Voice role

=== Video games ===
Year	Title	Voice role	Notes
2013	Star Trek	Leonard McCoy	Also likeness
2023	"Let's get to Work"		Armored Core VI: Fires of Rubicon live-action trailer
2024	Ark: Survival Ascended	Bob	Bob's Tall Tales downloadable content
