= Corky Ehlers =

American television and film editor

- Born: Donald Ehlers
- Occupation(s): Television and film editor
- Parents: Donald Ehlers (father); Evelyn Lessley (mother)
- Relatives: Elgin Lessley

Corky Ehlers is an American television and film editor.

He was born Donald "Corky" Ehlers, son of Evelyn Lessley, niece of Elgin Lessley, and Donald Ehlers, an assistant process camera at RKO.

He worked in Gettysburg (1993), starring Tom Berenger and Martin Sheen; The Food of the Gods (1976), directed by Bert I. Gordon and based on a novel by H. G. Wells; Tarantulas: The Deadly Cargo (1977), directed by Stuart Hagmann; Mysterious Island Of Beautiful Women (1979), directed by Joseph Pevney; and The Triangle Factory Fire Scandal (1979), directed by Mel Stuart.

== Filmography ==
- Texas Hold 'Em
- East of Yuma (2019)
- South Dakota (2017)
- Rodeo & Juliet (2015)
- Gods and Generals (2003)
- The Song of the Lark (2001)
- The Wonderful World of Disney (1997-2001)
- Border Line (1999)
- Still Holding On: The Legend of Cadillac Jack (1998)
- The Almost Perfect Bank Robbery (1997)
- True Women (1997)
- Tidal Wave: No Escape (1997)
- Amor venenoso (1996)
- The Babysitter's Seduction (1996)
- The Price of Love (1995)
- The Four Diamonds (1995)
- Johnny's Girl (1995)
- Liz: The Elizabeth Taylor Story (1995)
- Return to Lonesome Dove (1993)
- Gettysburg (1993)
- Prophet of Evil: The Ervil LeBaron Story (1993)
- Miss Rose White (1992)
- Mann & Machine (1992)
- Harley Davidson and the Marlboro Man (1991)
- Decoration Day (1990)
- Casey's Gift: For Love of a Child (1990)
- Revealing Evidence: Stalking the Honolulu Strangler (1990)
- The Outsiders (1990)
- A Son's Promise (1990)
- Montana (1990)
- Lonesome Dove (1989)
- Bluegrass (1988)
- A Hobo's Christmas (1987)
- A Stranger Waits (1987)
- A Place to Call Home (1987)
- Firefighter (1986)
- The Parent Trap II (1986)
- Robert Kennedy and His Times (1985)
- Bill: On His Own (1983)
- Adam (1983)
- Jaws 3-D (1983)
- Ripley's Believe It or Not! (1982)
- Mysterious Two (1982)
- The Jayne Mansfield Story (1980)
- The Chisholms (1979-1980)
- Mysterious Island of Beautiful Women (1979)
- The Triangle Factory Fire Scandal (1979)
- In Search of... (1978)
- Ruby and Oswald (1978)
- Tarantulas: The Deadly Cargo (1977)
- Stunts (1977)
- The Last of the Cowboys (1977)
- The Food of the Gods (1977)
- The Chosen (1977)
- Return to Macon County (1975)
- Abby (1974)
- Melvin Purvis G-MAN (1974)
- National Geographic Specials (1973)
- When Michael Calls (1972)

== Bibliography ==
- Havert, Nik (30 April 2019). The Golden Age of Disaster Cinema: A Guide to the Films, 1950-1979. McFarland Publishing. p. 256. ISBN 9781476667300.
