= Lonesome Dove: The Series =

American western television series

- Also known as: Lonesome Dove: The Outlaw Years
- Genre: Drama; Western
- Starring: Scott Bairstow; Eric McCormack
- Country of origin: United States
- Original language: English
- No. of seasons: 2
- No. of episodes: 43

Production
- Executive producers: Suzanne de Passe; Robert Halmi Jr.
- Production companies: Telegenic Programs Inc.; RHI Entertainment; Rysher TPE

Original release
- Network: Syndication
- Release: September 26, 1994 – May 16, 1996

Lonesome Dove: The Series is an American western drama television series that debuted in first-run syndication on September 26, 1994. It serves as continuation of the story of the miniseries of the same name. The television series starred Scott Bairstow and Eric McCormack, and its executive producers were Suzanne de Passe and Robert Halmi Jr. The series was produced by Telegenic Programs Inc. and RHI Entertainment in association with Rysher TPE, in conjunction with Canadian television network CTV.

In its second season which aired in syndication during the 1995–96 television season, the series was renamed Lonesome Dove: The Outlaw Years.

== Plot ==
In the series, Scott Bairstow plays the role of Newt Call, taking over the role played by Ricky Schroder in the original 1989 Lonesome Dove miniseries and its 1993 sequel Return to Lonesome Dove. The story follows Call as he leaves home to find adventure in Curtis Wells, Montana. He soon becomes attracted to Hannah (Christianne Hirt), the daughter of local newspaper publisher Josiah Peale (Paul Le Mat). Call also crosses paths with a stranger named Col. Francis Clay Mosby (Eric McCormack), who is revealed to be a former Confederate officer who has taken up a life of crime as his revenge against the Union.

== Cast ==
Season 1 refers to Lonesome Dove: The Series, while season 2 refers to Lonesome Dove: The Outlaw Years.

=== Main ===
- Scott Bairstow as Newt Call
- Eric McCormack as Colonel Francis Clay Mosby
- Christianne Hirt as Hannah Peale (season 1)
- Kelly Rowan as Mattie Shaw (season 2)
- Paul Johansson as Austin Peale (recurring, season 1; main, season 2)
- Tracy Scoggins as Amanda (season 2)

=== Recurring ===
- Paul Le Mat as Josiah Peele
- Bret Hart as Luther Root
- Diahann Carroll as Ida Grayson (season 1)
- Dennis Weaver as Bill "Buffalo Bill" Cody (season 1)
- Frank C. Turner as Unbob Finch (season 2)

== Production ==
The series was filmed in the plains of Alberta, Canada, near Calgary. For its second season, the series was renamed Lonesome Dove: The Outlaw Years, and was retooled for a greater focus on action. The series was cancelled in March 1996, after two seasons, due to low ratings.

== Episodes ==
=== Series overview ===
Season	Episodes	Originally released	
Season	Episodes	First released	Last released
1	21	September 26, 1994	May 29, 1995
2	22	September 21, 1995	May 16, 1996

=== Lonesome Dove: The Series (1994–95) ===
No. overall	No. in season	Title	Original release date	Prod. code
1	1	"O Western Wind"	September 26, 1994	700-211
2	2	"Down Come Rain"	October 3, 1994	700-210
3	3	"When Wilt Thou Blow"	October 10, 1994	700-209
4	4	"Wild Horses"	October 17, 1994	700-212
5	5	"Judgment Day"	October 24, 1994	700-060
6	6	"Duty Bound"	October 31, 1994	700-061
7	7	"Long Shot"	November 7, 1994	700-063
8	8	"Last Stand"	November 14, 1994	700-062
9	9	"Ballad of a Gunfighter"	November 21, 1994	700-205
10	10	"Where the Heart Is"	November 28, 1994	700-066
11	11	"Firebrand"	January 30, 1995	700-065
12	12	"High Lonesome"	February 6, 1995	700-206
13	13	"Law and Order"	February 13, 1995	700-064
14	14	"The Road Home"	February 20, 1995	700-059
15	15	"Blood Money"	February 27, 1995	700-056
16	16	"Buffalo Bill's Wild West Show"	April 24, 1995	700-057
17	17	"Traveler"	May 1, 1995	700-207
18	18	"Rebellion"	May 8, 1995	700-204
19	19	"The List"	May 15, 1995	700-058
20	20	"Ties That Bind"	May 22, 1995	700-208
21	21	"Snowbound"	May 29, 1995	700-203

=== Lonesome Dove: The Outlaw Years (1995–96) ===
No. overall	No. in season	Title	Original release date	Prod. code
22	1	"The Return"	September 21, 1995	791-296
23	2	"The Hanging"	September 28, 1995	791-297
24	3	"Fear"	October 5, 1995	791-299
25	4	"The Badlands"	October 19, 1995	791-302
26	5	"The Alliance"	November 9, 1995	791-301
27	6	"Nature of the Beast"	November 16, 1995	791-300
28	7	"Providence"	November 23, 1995	791-303
29	8	"Thicker than Water"	November 30, 1995	791-132
30	9	"Redemption"	December 7, 1995	791-130
31	10	"Day of the Dead"	December 14, 1995	791-131
32	11	"The Bride"	December 21, 1995	791-298
33	12	"Lover's Leap"	January 11, 1996	791-133
34	13	"Angel"	January 27, 1996	791-881
35	14	"Bounty"	February 8, 1996	791-134
36	15	"Cattle War"	March 7, 1996	791-135
37	16	"Betrayal"	March 14, 1996	791-905
38	17	"The Hideout"	March 21, 1996	791-906
39	18	"Partners"	1996	791-903
40	19	"The Robbery"	April 18, 1996	791-904
41	20	"When She Was Good"	April 25, 1996	791-902
42	21	"Medicine"	May 2, 1996	791-901
43	22	"Love and War"	May 16, 1996	791-900

== Reception ==
Todd Everett of Variety was mostly positive in his review of Lonesome Dove: The Series, praising the script by Stephen Zito and Tom Towler, and the direction by Sidney J. Furie. Chris Willman of Los Angeles Times was more mixed in his review, praising the "luscious Canadian Rocky Mountain scenery", but noting that the syndicated television series shared little in common with its predecessors and lacked "any of the solemn sophistication of the first miniseries".
