= David Bell (composer) =

American composer

David A. Bell (born April 17, 1954 in Middletown, Ohio) is an American composer, known for his music for television shows. He grew up in Monroe, Ohio, where his father Paul Bell was the high school music teacher and his mother, Maria, was active in the community. David attended Miami University, Oxford, Ohio, and Eastman School of Music in Rochester, New York. From 1984 to 1991 he contributed music to 79 episodes of Murder, She Wrote, 5 episodes of "Dr. Quinn, Medicine Woman", followed by 66 episodes of Star Trek shows from 1994 to 2003. In 2002 he won the ASCAP Award (Top TV Series) for Enterprise, shared with the series' other regular composers.

== Television scores (partial) ==
Year	Title	Info
1984	Murder, She Wrote	80 episodes: Seasons one to seven
1987	In the Heat of the Night	53 episodes (including one TV movie): Season two to last season, and one TV movie ("Season 8") "Grow Old Along With Me", the finale of the whole thing.
1989–90	Jake and the Fatman	3 episodes: "Out of Nowhere" "You Turned the Tables on Me" "Put Your Dreams Away"
1993	Dr. Quinn, Medicine Woman	5 episodes: "Rite of Passage" "Heroes" "The Operation" "The Secret" (additional music; Olvis main composer) "Portraits" (main composer; theme and additional by Olvis; season finale)
1994–99	Star Trek: Deep Space Nine	24 episodes: "Second Skin" "Past Tense, Part II" "Heart of Stone" "Improbable Cause" "The Sword of Kahless" "Sons of Mogh" "The Quickening" "Looking for par'Mach in All the Wrong Places" "The Ascent" "Business as Usual" "Soldiers of the Empire" "In the Cards" "Rocks and Shoals" "Sacrifice of Angels" "Statistical Probabilities" "Who Mourns for Morn?" "In the Pale Moonlight" "Profit and Lace" "Take Me Out to the Holosuite" "Treachery, Faith and the Great River" "Covenant" "'Til Death Do Us Part" "Tacking Into the Wind" "The Dogs of War"
1995–2001	Star Trek: Voyager	33 episodes: "Faces" "Projections" "Persistence of Vision" "Meld" "The Thaw" "Flashback" "Remember" "Warlord" "Fair Trade" "Unity" "Distant Origin" "Nemesis" "Revulsion" "Waking Moments" "The Killing Game" "The Killing Game, Part II" "Demon" "Extreme Risk" "Once Upon a Time" "Bride of Chaotica!" "Dark Frontier" "11:59" "Barge of the Dead" "Alice" "Fair Haven" "Memorial" "Child's Play" "Muse" "Imperfection" "Flesh and Blood" "Nightingale" "Prophecy" "Homestead"
1996	Dead Man's Walk	3 episodes
2001–03	Enterprise	7 episodes: "Terra Nova" "Dear Doctor" "Fusion" "Fallen Hero" "Minefield" "Singularity" "Dawn"
