= Patricia Childress =

American actress

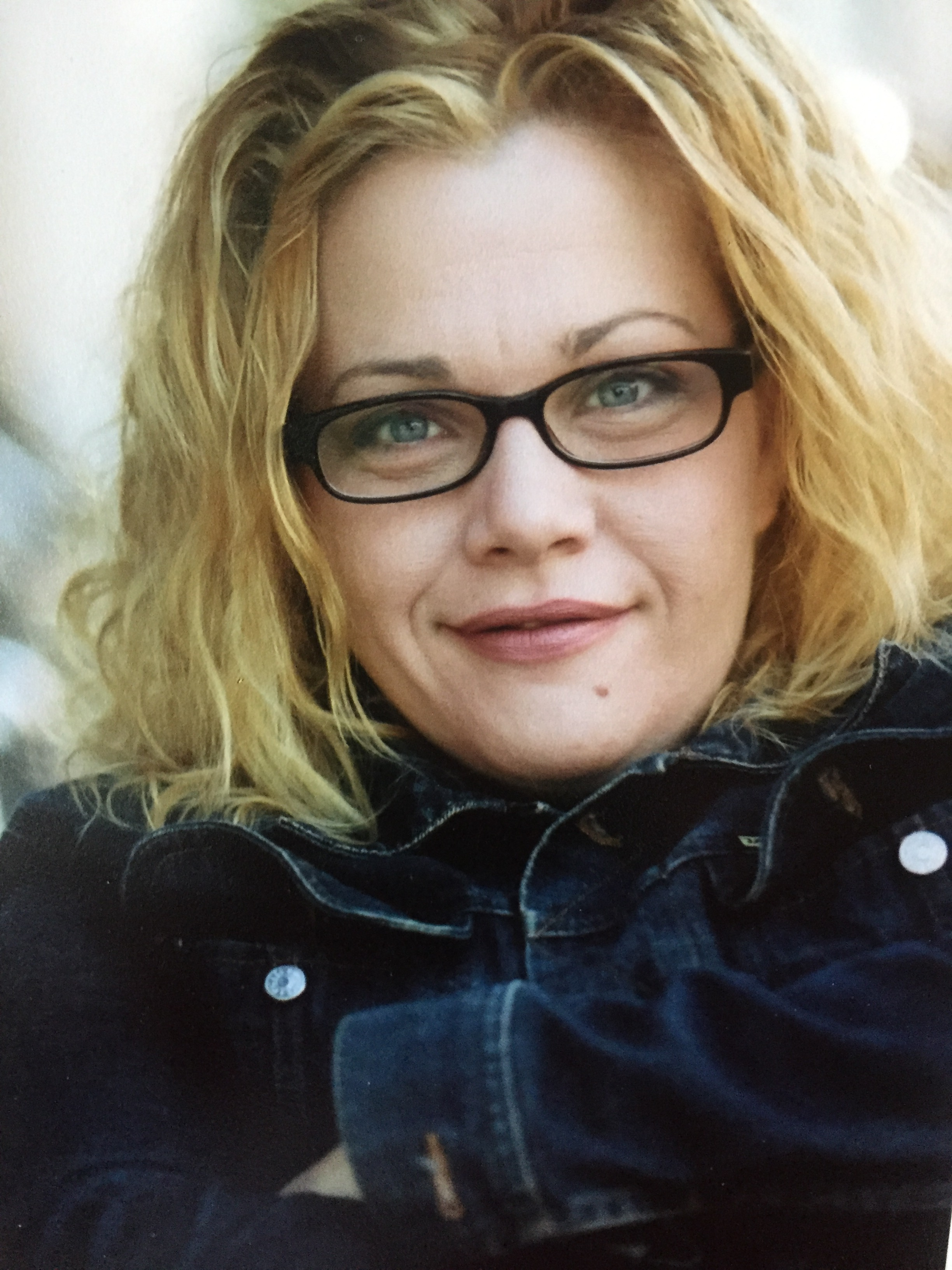
- Born: 1971 or 1972 (age 54–55); Arlington, Texas
- Education: Quail Valley Middle School; Dulles High School; SUNY at Old Westbury; Marymount Manhattan College
- Occupations: Actress; producer; director
- Spouse(s): Daniel Rogers (m. 2008)
- Relatives: Helen Childress

Patricia Childress (born 1971 or 1972) is a film and television actress, director, producer and writer who lives in Los Angeles where she works with many of the entertainment industry's most respected talents. Childress is the recipient of two Emmy Awards.

== Early life ==
Born in Arlington, Texas, Childress is the younger of two daughters–the other being screenwriter Helen Childress–of Cynthia Anne (née Denges) and Joel Patrick Childress. When she was four, the family moved to Missouri City, where she attended Quail Valley Middle School, and where—in that school's production of Lionel Bart's signature work—Childress portrayed the young Oliver Twist. She later attended Dulles High School, SUNY at Old Westbury, and Marymount Manhattan College.

== Career ==
Childress appeared in Dead Man's Walk, a television film by writer Larry McMurtry; Childress' work was commented on by the Los Angeles Times in a review appraising a "...sweetly compassionate performance by Patricia Childress."

She continued as an actor while producing a series for Oxygen in 2000 which she also directed and narrated, "As She Sees It." After independent production projects at MTV and CBS, she began an association with the Dr. Phil Show where she help to develop and create Dr. Phil's Ultimate Weight Loss Challenge which broke daytime ratings records in 2003. In 2005, Childress worked on the launch of model and television personality Tyra Banks program, The Tyra Banks Show. Earning two Emmys—2008 and 2009, each in the "Outstanding Talk Show/Information" category—she was the supervising creative producer and supervising field producer for five years for the popular daytime program.

Childress has launched four successful television shows: The Dr. Phil Ultimate Weight Loss Show, The Tyra Banks Show, The Talk and Anderson. She has written and produced programming with the A&E, Bravo, CBS, and VH1 networks. She recently produced and directed a series of Webisodes: Fa Fa Fa Fashion, with Vogue magazine contributing editor Andre Leon Talley and model Tyra Banks.

== Personal life ==
Since at least 2008, Childress has been married to Brazilian-born video editor Daniel Rogers.
