= Return to Lonesome Dove =

1993 television miniseries

- 1993 newspaper advertisement for the miniseries
- Written by: John Wilder
- Directed by: Mike Robe
- Starring: Jon Voight; Barbara Hershey; Rick Schroder; Louis Gossett, Jr.; William Petersen; Oliver Reed; Dennis Haysbert; Reese Witherspoon; Timothy Scott; Chris Cooper; Nia Peeples; Barry Tubb
- Music by: Ken Thorne
- Country of origin: United States
- Original language: English

Production
- Producer: Dyson Lovell
- Cinematography: Kees Van Oostrum
- Editor: Corky Ehlers

Original release
- Network: CBS
- Release: November 14 – November 18, 1993

Related
- Lonesome Dove; Lonesome Dove: The Series

Return to Lonesome Dove is a 1993 American three part television miniseries, written by John Wilder involving characters created in Larry McMurtry's Western novel Lonesome Dove which was broadcast by CBS and first aired on November 14, 16 and 18, 1993. The story focuses on a retired Texas Ranger and his adventures driving mustangs from Texas to Montana. It was followed by Lonesome Dove: The Series.

It is a sequel to the 1989 miniseries Lonesome Dove, but was not written by McMurtry, who wrote and published his own sequel novel, Streets of Laredo, in the same time frame. McMurtry followed Streets of Laredo with two prequels, which with Laredo were also subsequently made into TV miniseries.

== Plot ==
=== Part I - The Vision ===
Captain Woodrow F. Call, having just buried his friend Augustus McCrae near Lonesome Dove in Texas, plans to return to his ranch, signposted as "Hat Creek Cattle Company", in Montana. Call sends word to Newt Dobbs that he intends to meet him in Ogallala, Nebraska at the home of Clara Allen, with a herd of wild Mustangs that he hopes to drive north to interbreed.

To help drive the herd he seeks the help of former companions Gideon Walker, a San Antonio dressmaker and ex-ranger, and wrangler Isom Pickett. They are also joined by Pickett's family and his brother, Isaac. Walker also hires a group of Mexican vaqueros, who are led by a woman known as Augostina Vega, who harbors a resentment against Call for some unknown reason.

Newt, still in charge at the Montana ranch, leaves Pea Eye Parker in charge and heads off with Jasper Fant to meet Call, but while in Miles City they are involved in a bar fight that concludes with the shooting of two locals. Surrendering to the sheriff, they are helped by his neighbor, Gregor Dunnigan, and paroled into his custody as employees (Newt had previously rescued Gregor's young wife, Ferris Dunnigan, from cattle rustlers). Meanwhile, Call captures an outlaw named Cherokee Jack Jackson, but barely escapes with his life after Jack's gang rescues him.

=== Part II - The Forge ===
Call, having jumped into a river and trekked barefoot across the plains, stumbles half-dead into a Cheyenne village. The chief recognizes him as an enemy, but nevertheless honors his bravery with a horse, a rifle, and his widowed sister Many Tears. Call then heads off to meet Clara Allen, and learns of Newt's situation.

While on the trail, however, Isaac is killed by the outlaw Cherokee Jack, and is buried with a headstone dated "Gone to glory 4 August 1878". Isom has to take his place in leading the herd. When the children become sick, Augostina heads off to Fort Wallace for medicine, but is forced to shoot her army escorts when they attempt to rape her. Gideon then helps her with a fabricated alibi when an army patrol arrives to investigate.

After his return to Montana, having left his 'wife' with Clara, Call is disturbed to find Newt working for Dunnigan, believing that he is only there because of his young wife. But Newt is determined to honor his debt to Call's neighbor, and later confronts his father and tries to explain why he was unable to finish his mission. Meanwhile, back in Ogallala, lightning strikes start wildfires that destroy all of the Allen homestead.

=== Part III - The Legacy ===
Miraculously, Clara Allen, July Johnson, Clara's two daughters, Johnson's son, her ranch-hand, Cholo, and Many Tears, survive the inferno but Johnson is badly burnt. They head off to town to recover, just as Gideon and the others arrive. Through Gideon, Clara soon learns of Gus's secret daughter, Augostina, and also agrees to allow her herd to go north with Call's.

Call meets Dunnigan on the range, and comes into conflict with him and his "Montana's Cattleman's Alliance". Things come to a head when he decides to surround his property with barbed wire, and the wagons and the wire are destroyed by a group of masked men. Newt, now distanced from Call, becomes uneasy with Dunnigan because of his campaign to drive the other ranchers of the region out of business, but is reluctant to part ways because of the debt he feels he owes him. Added to this is the pressure being placed on Newt by Dunnigan who starts to treat him "like a son", and his wife, who begins showing an increased romantic interest in him.

As the herders head north, they stop at Miles City, where Johnson has his bandages removed. Gideon begins showing a romantic interest in Clara, inviting her out on a dinner-date. They are observed by Dunnigan, who secretly hires Cherokee Jack to stir up trouble between The Alliance and unaffiliated groups, including free-rangers and homesteaders. Dunnigan's aim is to solidify The Alliance's hold on the territory so they will have complete control over the cattle/beef market in years to come.

=== Part IV - The Passing ===
Upon reaching Montana, the horse drovers begin to settle in at Hat Creek ranch. Call and Augostina have a confrontation, in which she reveals the reason for her animosity towards him: he shot her mother. Call convinces her that her mother's death was an accident. Call had tracked her mother's brother, a bandit, but she had jumped in front of a bullet meant for the bandit. He also reasons with her that her father, Gus, had not raped her mother by pointing out that her name, Augostina (the feminine derivative of "Augustus"), was given to her by her mother to honor her father's memory. Call then makes her a partner in the ranch.

As part of their deal, Cherokee Jack attacks a small herd of cattle on Kenilworth Ranch, killing two cattlemen in plain view of Dunnigan and Newt (who is now aware of Dunnigan's plan to name him his inheritor). Dunnigan uses this attack to stir up fear, and to begin to consolidate his control. Jack also attacks Clara's family and Gideon while they are on their way into town. Gideon and four others die in the ambush, and Clara is severely wounded. However July Johnson manages to warn Call of the attack. Call returns to the canyon where the attack had taken place, finds Gideon's body, and also finds a blood trail leading away in another direction. He, Pea, and Isom follow the trail and find Cherokee Jack attempting to flee into the nearby hills. Isom chases Jack down, and before Call executes him, Jack tells him about the arrangements he had made with Dunnigan.

Dunnigan's alliance begins persecuting the smaller outfits, using cattle his men had planted in the other men's herds as an excuse. Call rounds up all the men he can, and attempts to stall Dunnigan long enough for reinforcements to arrive from other unaffiliated groups. He confronts Dunnigan with the money purse about his relationship with Cherokee Jack, which Dunnigan denies. Newt, seeing the evidence, knows that Dunnigan is lying, and goes to join Call. Dunnigan attempts to shoot Call, whereupon Newt shoots Dunnigan and the others surrender.

Call and Clara bury Gideon, whereupon Clara decides she wishes to leave Montana and return home. Newt goes to speak with Ferris, and tells her that he doesn't feel that their arrangement of him assuming Dunnigan's estate should still be valid. She tells him that she feels it is, but he cannot accept. He goes on to say his goodbyes to Call as well, expressing a desire to move on, and Call finally proudly identifies himself as Newt's father.

== Cast and characters ==
- Jon Voight as Captain Woodrow F. Call, a hardworking former Texas Ranger who won a merit award from the Governor of Texas for "courage under fire", he served with Gus McCrae when both were young men. Though Call has utter disdain for lazy men who drink, gamble and whore their lives away, he has his own secret which he hides carefully from his comrades. Call's ability to "break" unmanageable horses is also well known.
- Barbara Hershey as Clara Forsythe Allen, former love of Gus McCrae and owner of a ranch in Nebraska. Clara blames Call for her failed relationship with Gus.
- Ricky Schroder as Newt Dobbs, a young orphan raised by Gus and Call. His mother was a prostitute named Maggie Dobbs, who died when he was a child. He suspects that Call is his father, despite Call not formally admitting it.
- Louis Gossett Jr. as Isom Pickett, an African-American cowboy who agrees to help Call herd his Mustangs.
- William Petersen as Gideon Walker, a former Ranger who served with Gus and Call. He agrees to help Call herd his Mustangs.
- Oliver Reed as Gregor Dunnigan, a wealthy Scottish-born Montana rancher on a spread near the Hat Creek Cattle Company.
- Dennis Haysbert as Jack "Cherokee Jack" Jackson, an African-American outlaw raised by the Cherokee.
- Reese Witherspoon as Ferris Dunnigan, the young wife of Gregor, who befriends Newt.
- Tim Scott as "Pea Eye" Parker, the wrangler and blacksmith of the Hat Creek Cattle Company. He served as a corporal in the Rangers under Gus and Call. Pea Eye (his real name long forgotten) is not especially bright, but he is reliable, brave, and kind. He follows Call's lead without question.
- Chris Cooper as July Johnson, a former sheriff of the town of Fort Smith, Arkansas. July has become a hand on the property of Clara.
- C. C. H. Pounder as Sara Pickett, Isom's wife.
- Nia Peeples as Agostina Vega, a Mexican wrangler on the Mustang drive to Montana, the daughter of Augustus McCrae.
- Barry Tubb as Jasper Fant, The wrangler of the Hat Creek Cattle Company. He is often troublesome and at times incredibly weak.
- William Sanderson as "Lippy" Jones
- David Carpenter as "Needle" Nelson
- Leon Singer as Bolivar, cook
- Jack Caffrey as Cholo
- Reginald T. Dorsey as Isaac Pickett

== Reception ==
According to Ken Tucker:

Dove II relies far too much on what Dove I used as window dressing: long, deep shots of rolling farmland and dusty desert. Lonesome Dove's director of photography, Douglas Milsome, has been bumped up to second-unit director here, and it's clear that, in the absence of vivid atmosphere in the script, Milsome was prevailed upon to gussy up the proceedings. He did, but the result serves to emphasize the ultimate pointlessness of this whole enterprise. Everything that was complicated and implied in Lonesome Dove—the subtle, shifting relationships between the main characters, their crisscrossing pasts—is tidied up, spelled out, and tediously resolved in Return. Stick around for seven hours and you'll find that this is a perfectly decent Western; you might even shed a tear or two. But you'll also know that, when it's finished, a grand piece of TV mythmaking has been reduced to a horse opera.

According to Rick Kogan:

It's asking a lot of the still-young-looking Rick Schroder to handle the heavy legacy of "Lonesome Dove." At the end of "Return to Lonesome Dove," the sequel to the majesterial 1988 mini-series, when Schroder's character Newt takes off into the sunset to live out his own dusty dreams, he does so with tears in his eyes. They are meant to be tears of truth, but it's easy to believe they are the result of riding through a long, heartbreaking disappointment. "Return to Lonesome Dove," which spreads its seven hours thinly across three evenings (8 p.m. Sunday and Tuesday, 7 p.m. Thursday, CBS-Ch. 2), does more than suffer by comparison with the original. It is a mess on its own terms, closer in emotional depth and action to old episodes of TV's "The Cisco Kid" than to the original "Lonesome Dove." But what could you expect? The original was one of a kind.
