= Lonesome Dove (miniseries) =

1989 television miniseries

- VHS promotional poster
- Genre: Western; Adventure; Historical
- Based on: Lonesome Dove by Larry McMurtry
- Teleplay by: William D. Wittliff
- Directed by: Simon Wincer
- Starring: Robert Duvall; Tommy Lee Jones; Danny Glover; Diane Lane; Robert Urich; Frederic Forrest; D. B. Sweeney; Ricky Schroder; Anjelica Huston
- Composer: Basil Poledouris
- Country of origin: United States
- Original language: English
- No. of episodes: 4

Production
- Producers: Dyson Lovell; Suzanne de Passe
- Cinematography: Douglas Milsome
- Editor: Corky Ehlers
- Running time: 384 minutes
- Production companies: Motown Productions; Pangaea; Qintex Entertainment
- Budget: $20 million

Original release
- Network: CBS
- Release: February 5 – February 8, 1989

Related
- Return to Lonesome Dove; Streets of Laredo; Dead Man's Walk; Comanche Moon; Lonesome Dove: The Series

Lonesome Dove is a 1989 American epic Western television miniseries directed by Simon Wincer. It is an adaptation of the 1985 novel by Larry McMurtry, in turn based upon an unproduced screenplay by McMurtry and Peter Bogdanovich, and is the first installment in the Lonesome Dove series. It was written for the screen by William D. Wittliff and stars an ensemble cast, headed by Robert Duvall, Tommy Lee Jones, Danny Glover, Diane Lane, and Anjelica Huston.

The series originally aired in four installments on CBS, between February 5 and February 8, 1989. An estimated 26 million homes tuned in to watch Lonesome Dove, unusually high numbers at that time for both a Western and a miniseries. By the show's end, it had earned huge ratings and virtually revamped the entire 1989–1990 television season.

A favorite with audiences, as well as critics, Lonesome Dove garnered many honors and awards. At the 1989 Emmy Awards, the miniseries had 18 nominations and seven wins, including Outstanding Directing for a Limited Series or Movie (for Wincer). It also won two Golden Globes, for Best Miniseries and Best Actor – Miniseries (Robert Duvall).

== Plot ==
In the late 1870s, Captain Augustus "Gus" McCrae and Captain Woodrow F. Call, two famous former Texas Rangers, run a livery in the small, dusty Texas border town of Lonesome Dove along the Rio Grande. Gus is an upbeat womanizer and twice a widower, and Call is a strict, stoic workaholic. Working with them are Joshua Deets, a black tracker and scout from their Ranger days, Pea Eye Parker, another former Ranger who works hard but is not very bright, and Bolívar, a retired Mexican bandit who is their cook. Also living with them is Newt Dobbs, a 17-year-old whose mother was a prostitute named Maggie who died nine years ago. Gus alone knows who Newt's father is.

Gus is also close to the town's only prostitute, the young and beautiful Lorena Wood, who longs to one day leave Lonesome Dove behind.

=== Part I: Leaving ===
Former Texas Ranger and comrade of Gus and Call's, Jake Spoon, shows up after an absence of more than a decade. He reveals that he is a fugitive after having accidentally shot the dentist and mayor of Fort Smith, Arkansas, in a bar-room gunfight. The dentist/mayor's brother happens to be the sheriff, July Johnson.

Reunited with Gus and Call, Jake's glowing description of Montana inspires Call to gather a herd of cattle and drive them there, attracted by the notion of settling pristine country. Gus is less enthusiastic, pointing out that they are getting old and that they are Rangers and traders, not cowboys, but he changes his mind upon learning that his former lover, Clara Allen, is living in Nebraska, and makes plans to visit her on the way. Jake begins a relationship with Lorena.

At the continued insistence of the dentist's widow, Sheriff Johnson sets off in pursuit of Spoon, accompanied by his young stepson Joe, who travels at the request of Joe's mother and Sheriff Johnson's wife Elmira. Once her son and husband have left for Texas, Elmira leaves Fort Smith for Ogallala, Nebraska, to meet up with her first husband and Joe's father, Dee Boot. Sailing up the Arkansas River on a whiskey boat, she falls in with a pair of buffalo hunters.

Meanwhile, the men of Lonesome Dove make preparations for their adventure north, including stealing 2,500 horses and cattle from across the Rio Grande in Mexico, befriending two lost Irish immigrants, Allan and Sean O'Brien, and being joined by nearly all of the male citizens of the town. Before leaving, Gus returns to fetch his livery sign and say farewell to his pigs, which end up following him, anyway.

Back in Fort Smith, Peach (widowed from Jake's shooting) insists that Roscoe Brown, July's timid deputy, must find July to inform him that his wife has run off and is pregnant.

Jake decides not to travel with the herd, mainly because he has reluctantly promised to take Lorena to San Francisco via Denver. Some time later, the group survives a huge dust storm, but Sean, one of the Irishmen, is attacked by water moccasins while crossing the Nueces River.

=== Part II: On the Trail ===
The young Irishman soon succumbs to his numerous snakebites, dies, and is buried. While traveling through a forest in East Texas, Roscoe encounters Janey, a young girl fleeing from an old abusive "owner". As they travel together, they are robbed, when Sheriff Johnson happens to catch up with them. Meanwhile, Johnson's wife Elmira arrives by boat at Bent's Fort, Colorado, and sets off overland across the plains with two hunters interested in her following.

Meanwhile, the camp's cook refuses to cross the river after Sean O'Brien's mishap, so Gus and Call head into San Antonio in search of a new cook. They soon find Po Campo, who gets the job after impressing Gus and Call not only with his cooking, but also with his attitude. On the way back, Gus catches up with Lorie, whom Jake has abandoned to go gambling in Austin. Before he returns, Gus and Lorie encounter Blue Duck, a notorious Mexican/Indian bandit from Gus and Call's Ranger days. After Gus sends Newt over to Lorie's camp to guard her, Blue Duck knocks Newt unconscious, kidnaps Lorie, and attempts to sell/barter her to a gang of Comanchero bandits camped on the Llano Estacado.

Knowing that Gus is in pursuit, Blue Duck asks the Comancheros to kill Gus when he arrives, with Lorie being their reward. Gus and the bandits engage in a brief gun battle that quickly turns into a stalemate. Gus, having killed his horse for cover on the flat plains, is pinned down by the bandits' gunfire until nightfall, when Sheriff Johnson's party arrives and scares them off. Johnson, despite Gus's protests, joins Gus in the rescue of Lorie. The two then ride to a hilltop above the Comancheros' camp. After a brief one-sided gunfight, in which Gus kills all of Blue Duck's gang, Lorie is rescued. While Gus and Johnson are away, Blue Duck uses his knife to kill deputy Roscoe, Janey, and Joe. He then steals their horses and escapes. The tearful sheriff, with Gus's help, buries them all. Gus and Lorie ride north to rejoin Call and the herd. After being severely traumatized by her capture, Lorie now regards Gus as her primary protector. Meanwhile, in a saloon in Fort Worth, oblivious of Lorie's ordeal, Jake Spoon falls in with a gang that is headed north to rob banks in Kansas.

=== Part III: The Plains ===
As they ride through the bush, Spoon and the robbers come across a group of horse wranglers. They shoot most of the wranglers and steal the horses. They then travel to a sodbuster's farm, two of whom the leader kills, hangs, and burns for no apparent reason. Although Spoon disagrees, the gang leader bullies and threatens Spoon into submission. When one of the dying wranglers is rescued by the cowboys, Call leads a posse to search for the thieves. Gus and Call quickly capture the robbers and prepare to hang them. With his last words, Jake Spoon admits that it is better to be hanged by his friends than by strangers. Jake, with his head in the noose, then spurs his own horse, which causes it to run from underneath him, effectively hanging himself, much to the shock and dismay of his former friends.

By chance, Elmira and the buffalo hunters arrive at the home of Gus' old sweetheart, Clara Allen, near the Platte River in Nebraska. Clara's husband is an invalid, having been kicked in the head by a horse. Elmira gives birth to a son, but abandons the child with Clara and goes to Ogallala in search of Dee Boot. She finds Dee in jail, where he is shortly hanged for a murder. Two weeks later, Sheriff Johnson also arrives at Clara's house and sees his abandoned son. Later in Ogallala, Sheriff Johnson sees Elmira, who is still recovering from childbirth. That night, Elmira secretly departs east for St. Louis with the two buffalo hunters, but all three and their horses are soon killed by the Sioux. Sheriff Johnson returns to Clara's house and is offered a job. Clara, having lost her own three sons to pneumonia, is quite fond of Johnson's newborn son, and names him Martin.

Gus and Call's cattle drive also arrives at Ogallala, where they relax and enjoy the town. Some U.S. cavalry soldiers attempt to commandeer the group's horses, and things intensify when their scout both brutally beats top cowhand Dishwater "Dish" Boggett and viciously whips Newt when they resist, prompting an enraged Call to savagely beat the scout and nearly kill him before Gus restrains him with a lasso. In the aftermath, Gus tells Newt that Call is his father. Clara, although happy to see Gus, and with her husband gravely ill, makes it clear that she will not marry Gus. Instead, she invites Gus to settle and ranch on a piece of nearby property. Further, she invites Lorie to remain with her daughters and her. Before he departs, Gus promises he will return one day.

Continuing their journey, Gus and Call lead their cattle drive north through the badlands of Wyoming Territory, nearly exhausting their water supply, and into Montana Territory. Impoverished Indians soon steal a dozen of their horses for food. Gus, Call, and Deets ride after the horse thieves to retrieve the horses. Call frightens the Indians away with a gunshot. Deets takes pity on a blind Indian child left behind, and goes to assist him. Another Indian mistakes his intentions and impales Deets with a spear. Mortally wounded, he dies in Gus and Call's arms a few moments later.

=== Part IV: Return ===
Deets is buried, then the party continues on across the Powder River. Meanwhile, in Nebraska, Clara's husband finally dies and is buried, as well.

Leaving the main group to scout ahead with Pea Eye Parker, Gus decides to pursue some buffalo. Parker and he end up being chased by mounted Indians, and Gus is badly wounded by two arrows in his right leg. While trying to get back to the herd for help, an exhausted Pea Eye is guided by the ghost of Deets, whereas Gus is found by a stranger and taken 40 miles (64 km) away to Miles City, Montana. Call leaves to search for Gus.

There, a doctor amputates Gus's right leg. He tells Gus that his left leg is septic and that he will die unless it also is amputated, but Gus refuses to let him remove it. When Call arrives, a dying Gus tells him to give his money to Lorie, and asks him to return his body to Texas and to accept Newt as his son. After some brief reminiscing with Call at Gus's bedside, Gus dies. Call arranges to store Gus's body in the town over the winter. He then leads the cattle drive to a wilderness lake where the party raises a cabin and a corral.

The following spring, Call honors Gus's wish to be returned to Texas. Just before departing, Call gives Newt his horse, his rifle, and a pocket watch that belonged to his own father, and states that Newt will run the ranch in his absence. However, he is still unable to claim Newt as his son, leaving Newt devastated.

Call soon returns to Ogallala. Sheriff Johnson, Clara, Lorie, and the ranch hand Dish live happily together. Dish is enamored with Lorie, but she does not return his affections. When Call brings Gus's body, Lorie stays and mourns by the coffin all night long. Clara asks Call to bury Gus at her home, but Call declines. Clara then berates Call for the bad effect Gus and he had on each other, blaming their adventures as the reason neither of them could find happiness.

After a long journey, Call arrives at Santa Rosa, New Mexico Territory, where Blue Duck has finally been captured. Call visits Blue Duck in his jail cell, where Blue Duck mocks Call's failure to capture him. While being led to the gallows, Blue Duck grabs deputy Robert Hofer and throws himself out a window, choosing a murder-suicide rather than allow himself to be hanged.

Despite blizzards, a broken wagon, and the loss of the coffin, Call finally succeeds in burying Gus after a journey of some 3,000 miles (4,800 km). Call weeps for his friend after burying him, the first display of emotion he has allowed himself since Deets's death. After the burial, Call tours Lonesome Dove, reunites with his former cook, Bolivar, and discovers that the saloon owner who once employed Lorie was so heartbroken by her departure that he burned the saloon down around himself.

As Call walks out of town, a reporter recognizes him and tries to interview him about his remarkable feats. Call ignores the reporter's questions—aside from ironically agreeing with him that he was a man of vision—and walks away.

== Cast ==
=== Starring ===
- Robert Duvall as Captain Augustus "Gus" McCrae, former Texas Ranger
- Tommy Lee Jones as Captain Woodrow F. Call, former Texas Ranger
- Danny Glover as Joshua Deets, former scout for the Texas Rangers
- Diane Lane as Lorena Wood, prostitute
- Robert Urich as Jake Spoon, former Texas Ranger
- Frederic Forrest as Blue Duck, half Native-American, half Mexican bandit and murderer
- D. B. Sweeney as Dishwater "Dish" Boggett, ramrod of the Hat Creek trail herd
- Ricky Schroder as Newt Dobbs, Captain Call's illegitimate son
- Anjelica Huston as Clara Forsythe Allen, Gus' former love

=== Also starring ===
- Chris Cooper as Sheriff July Johnson
- Tim Scott as "Pea Eye" Parker, former Texas Ranger
- Glenne Headly as Elmira "Ellie" Johnson
- Barry Corbin as Deputy Roscoe Brown
- William Sanderson as "Lippy" Jones
- Barry Tubb as Jasper Fant
- Gavan O'Herlihy as Dan Suggs, leader of the Suggs Gang
- Steve Buscemi as Luke, takes on Elmira
- Frederick Coffin as "Big Zwey", takes on Elmira
- Travis Swords as Allan O'Brien
- Kevin O'Morrison as Doctor
- Ron Weyand as Old Hugh

=== Co-starring ===
- Nina Siemaszko as Janey
- Missy Crider as Sally Allen, Clara's daughter
- Lauren Stanley as Betsy Allen, Clara's daughter
- Jerry Biggs as Roy Suggs, Suggs Gang
- Sean Hennigan as Eddie Suggs, Suggs Gang
- Julius Tennon as "Frog Lip", Suggs Gang
- Bradley Gregg as Sean O'Brien
- Lanny Flaherty as "Soupy" Jones
- David Carpenter as "Needle" Nelson
- James McMurtry as Jimmy Rainey
- Charlie Haynie as Ben Rainey
- Sonny Carl Davis as Bert Borum
- Helena Humann as Peach Johnson
- O-Lan Jones as Sally Skull
- Jorge Martínez de Hoyos as Po Campo, second Hat Creek trail cook
- León Singer as Bolivar, Hat Creek cook and H.C. first trail cook
- Jack Caffrey as Cholo, Clara's ranch hand
- Adam Faraizl as Joe Boot
- Michael Tylo as Dee Boot
- Matthew Cowles as John "Monkey John"
- Margo Martindale as "Buffalo Heifer", prostitute
- Jordan Lund as Hutto
- Tony Epper as Dixon
- Bud Shrake as Sodbuster
- Pierre Epstein as Xavier Wanz, proprietor of the saloon

== Production ==
Most Hollywood studios were at first not interested in the rights to the novel, which ended up being bought by Motown Productions, headed by Suzanne de Passe. Motown made the miniseries for CBS with Robert Halmi Inc. as deficit financier. Robert Halmi's company was being taken over at that time by Qintex, whose head of American operations, David Evans, suggested Simon Wincer as director. CBS also suggested him on the basis of The Last Frontier (1986) and Bluegrass (1988). Robert Duvall, who had director approval, was a fan of some of Wincer's films and approved him.

Four actors (Charles Bronson, Robert Duvall, James Garner, and Jon Voight) were offered the role of Woodrow Call, but declined for various reasons before the role fell to Tommy Lee Jones. Garner said that he was originally set to play one of the lead roles, but had to drop out for ill health. Duvall turned down the part of Call on the grounds he had already played that type of character, and asked to play Gus. Bronson agreed to play Blue Duck, but he was under contract to Cannon Films, which said he was required to make a movie for them, instead.

The miniseries was partially shot at the Alamo Village, the movie set originally created for John Wayne's The Alamo (1960).

The majority of the miniseries was filmed at the Moody Ranch, seven miles (11 km) south of Del Rio, Texas. Other locations used for filming were ranches in Texas and New Mexico, as well as the Contrabando ghost town in Redford, Texas. The series was shot over 90 days. Real ranch horses were used for authenticity during the filming of the movie. Tommy Lee Jones and Robert Duvall did their own stunts in the film, except for one brief scene that required Duvall to ride in the center of a herd of bison.

== Reception ==
Lonesome Dove received universal acclaim from critics. The New York Times commented:

This six-hour miniseries, based on a Pulitzer Prize-winning novel by Larry McMurtry, revitalized both the miniseries and Western genres, both of which had been considered dead for several years.... Lonesome Dove earned 18 Emmy nominations and inspired a pair of miniseries sequels, as well as two attempts at an ongoing television series.

On review aggregator Rotten Tomatoes, 98% of 43 critics gave the series a positive review, with an average rating of 10.0/10. The website's critics consensus reads, "Headlined by Robert Duvall's sublimely rowdy performance, Lonesome Dove brings Larry McMurtry's beloved book to resounding life in an epic treatment that broadens the possibilities of what the silver screen is capable of."

The first installment, on February 5, 1989, led the Nielsen ratings for the week, with an impressive 28.5 rating (34 share, 44 million estimated viewers). That rating was the highest rating of any movie or miniseries that season, topping The Karen Carpenter Story (26.4 rating), and also well ahead of the first episode of the most massive miniseries that season, War and Remembrance (21.8 rating). Part 4 led ratings for the following week of ratings (27.3 rating), with Part 2 in 8th place (23.8 rating) and Part 3 in 4th place (24.8 rating).

Viewership and ratings for Lonesome Dove
No.	Title	Air date	Timeslot (ET)	Rating/share (households)	Viewers (millions)	Ref(s)
1	"Part 1"	February 5, 1989	Sunday 9:00 p.m.	28.5/42	44.1	
2	"Part 2"	February 6, 1989	Monday 9:00 p.m.	23.8/34	36.8	
3	"Part 3"	February 7, 1989	Tuesday 9:00 p.m.	24.8/37	37.0	
4	"Part 4"	February 8, 1989	Wednesday 9:00 p.m.	27.3/41	41.5	

== Awards and nominations ==
Lonesome Dove was nominated for 19 Emmy Awards, winning seven. The series was also deemed Program of the Year by the National Television Critics Association, as well as Outstanding Dramatic Achievement. It received the D.W. Griffith Award for Best Television Miniseries, and CBS was presented with a Peabody Award for Outstanding Achievement in Drama. In a 2003 TRIO Network Special, TRIO ranked Lonesome Dove third in a list of ten outstanding miniseries, beginning from the time the format was created

1989 Emmy Awards
Category	Won	Winner
Outstanding Achievement in Casting for a Miniseries or a Special	Yes	Lynn Kressel
Outstanding Achievement in Makeup for a Miniseries or a Special	Yes	Manlio Rocchetti (makeup supervisor), Carla Palmer (makeup artist), and Jean Ann Black (makeup artist); For Part 4 ("The Return")
Outstanding Achievement in Music Composition for a Miniseries or a Special (Dramatic Underscore)	Yes	Basil Poledouris (composer); For Part 4 ("The Return")
Outstanding Costume Design for a Miniseries or a Special	Yes	Van Broughton Ramsey; For Part 2 ("On the Trail")
Outstanding Directing in a Miniseries or a Special	Yes	Simon Wincer (director); For Part 1 ("Leaving") and Part 4 ("The Return")
Outstanding Sound Editing for a Miniseries or a Special	Yes	Dave McMoyler (supervising sound editor); Joseph Melody (co-supervising editor); Mark Steele, Richard S. Steele, Michael J. Wright, Gary Macheel, Stephen Grubbs, Mark Friedgen, Charles R. Beith Jr., Scott A. Tinsley, Karla Caldwell, George B. Bell, and G. Michael Graham (sound editors); Kristi Johns (supervising adr editor); Tom Villano (supervising music editor); and Jamie Forester (supervising music editor); For Part 3 ("The Plains")
Outstanding Sound Mixing for a Miniseries or a Special	Yes	Donald F. Johnson (sound mixer), James L. Aicholtz (dialogue mixer), Michael Herbick (music mixer), and Kevin O'Connell (sound effects mixer); For Part 4 ("The Return")
Outstanding Achievement in Hairstyling for a Miniseries or a Special	No	Philip Leto (hairstylist) and Manlio Rocchetti (hair supervisor); For Part 2 ("On the Trail")
Outstanding Art Direction for a Miniseries or a Special	No	Cary White (production designer) and Michael J. Sullivan (set decorator); For Part 4 ("The Return")
Outstanding Cinematography for a Miniseries or a Special	No	Douglas Milsome (director of photography); For Part 4 ("The Return")
Outstanding Editing for a Miniseries or a Special - Single Camera Production	No	Corky Ehlers (editor); For Part 3 ("The Plains")
Outstanding Lead Actor in a Miniseries or a Special	No	Robert Duvall; For Part 2 ("On the Trail")
Outstanding Lead Actor in a Miniseries or a Special	No	Tommy Lee Jones; For Part 4 ("The Return")
Outstanding Lead Actress in a Miniseries or a Special	No	Anjelica Huston; For Part 3 ("The Plains")
Outstanding Lead Actress in a Miniseries or a Special	No	Diane Lane; For Part 3 ("The Plains") and Part 4 ("The Return")
Outstanding Miniseries	No	Suzanne de Passe (executive producer), Bill Wittliff (executive producer), Robert Halmi Jr. (co-executive producer), Dyson Lovell (producer), and Michael Weisbarth (supervising producer)
Outstanding Supporting Actor in a Miniseries or a Special	No	Danny Glover; For Part 1 ("Leaving"), Part 2 ("On the Trail"), and Part 3 ("The Plains")
Outstanding Supporting Actress in a Miniseries or a Special	No	Glenne Headly; For Part 1 ("Leaving"), Part 2 ("On the Trail"), and Part 3 ("The Plains")
Outstanding Writing in a Miniseries or a Special	No	Bill Wittliff (teleplay); For Part 1 ("Leaving") and Part 4 ("The Return")

1990 Golden Globes
Category	Won	Winner
Best Mini-Series or Motion Picture Made for TV	Yes	
Best Performance by an Actor in a Mini-Series or Motion Picture Made for TV	Yes	Robert Duvall
Best Performance by an Actor in a Supporting Role in a Series, Mini-Series or Motion Picture Made for TV	No	Tommy Lee Jones
Best Performance by an Actress in a Supporting Role in a Series, Mini-Series or Motion Picture Made for TV	No	Anjelica Huston

Other
Awards	Category	Won	Winner
American Cinema Editors (1990)	Best Edited Episode from a Television Mini-Series	No	Corky Ehlers For Part 3 ("The Plains")
BMI Film & TV Awards (1990)		Yes	Basil Poledouris
Casting Society of America (1989)	Best Casting for TV Miniseries	Yes	Lynn Kressel
Directors Guild of America (1990)	Outstanding Directorial Achievement in Dramatic Specials	No	Simon Wincer
TV Land Awards (2007)	Miniseries You Didn't Miss a Moment Of	No	
Television Critics Association Awards (1989)	Outstanding Achievement in Drama	Yes	
Television Critics Association Awards (1989)	Program of the Year	Yes	
Western Heritage Awards (1990)	Television Feature Film	Yes	William D. Wittliff (writer/executive producer), Suzanne de Passe (executive producer), Robert Duvall (star), Tommy Lee Jones (star), and Anjelica Huston (star)
Writers Guild of America Awards (1990)	Adapted Long Form	Yes	William D. Wittliff; For Part 1 ("Leaving")

== Soundtrack ==
The score for Lonesome Dove was composed and conducted by Basil Poledouris, his first western and the first of his five scores for director Simon Wincer - Poledouris subsequently scored the director's next four theatrical films (Quigley Down Under, Harley Davidson and the Marlboro Man, Free Willy and Crocodile Dundee in Los Angeles). In 1993 Cabin Fever Music released an album of selections from his score; Sonic Images issued an expansion in 1998.

== Home media ==
Lonesome Dove has been released in various formats for over two decades.

- Cabin Fever Entertainment (1991-1998) VHS
- Ster-Kinekor Home Video (1994) VHS
- Hallmark Entertainment/Artisan Home Entertainment (1998-2003) VHS & DVD
- Genius Products/Vivendi Entertainment (2008-2014) DVD & Blu-ray
- Mill Creek Entertainment (2014-2019) DVD & Blu-ray

In 2008, Lonesome Dove was released on Blu-ray for the first time. This release, and the accompanying DVD release, was labeled the Collector's Edition. This edition was the first time the miniseries was presented in widescreen on home video.

Lonesome Dove was filmed in the full frame, 1.37:1 aspect ratio, but was framed so it could be presented in both fullscreen and widescreen. In the featurette "On Location with Director Simon Wincer" from the 2008 collector's edition, Wincer claims that prior to its television premier Lonesome Dove was screened for critics in a movie theater in the widescreen aspect ratio. He was very enthusiastic that the 2008 edition would be presented in widescreen and said "the quality of the picture will now be so much better . . . it just gives the film a whole new life."

== Bibliography ==
- A Book of Photographs from Lonesome Dove, by Bill Wittliff. Foreword by Larry McMurtry. The University of Texas Press, 2007. 188 pp., 112 color photos. ISBN 978-0-292-71311-6. Publishers info page for the book
- A Book on the Making of Lonesome Dove, Interviews by John Spong, studio archives photographs by Jeff Wilson, and on-set photographs by Bill Wittliff. 12 x 12 inches, 168 pp., 137 color and 2 b&w photos. The Wittliff Collections at Texas State University-San Marcos. https://web.archive.org/web/20100706171028/http://uweb.txstate.edu/gao/wittliff/collections/book_0047.html
