= Dyson Lovell =

British film producer and actor (1936–2024)

- Dyson Lovell in The Saint 1964
- Born: August 28, 1936
- Died: January 11, 2024 (aged 87)

Dyson Lovell (28 August 1936 – 11 January 2024) was a British film producer and actor. He produced amongst others, Franco Zeffirelli's Hamlet, starring Mel Gibson (1990), and Francis Ford Coppola's 1984 box-office flop The Cotton Club, starring Richard Gere and Diane Lane. He has received four Emmy Award, and three Golden Globe nominations for his work as a producer in television.

Lovell originally trained as an actor at RADA, and his early stage work included appearances at The Old Vic and small roles on Broadway. He has played supporting roles in such films as Franco Zeffirelli's 1968 version of Romeo and Juliet, in which he played Sampson.

Lovell died from cancer on 11 January 2024, at the age of 87.

== Productions ==
- Hamlet
- Endless Love
- Lonesome Dove
- Merlin
- Arabian Nights
- Jane Eyre
- The Odyssey
- Alice in Wonderland
- A Christmas Carol
- Cleopatra
- The Lion in Winter
