= Langtry, Texas =

- Unincorporated community
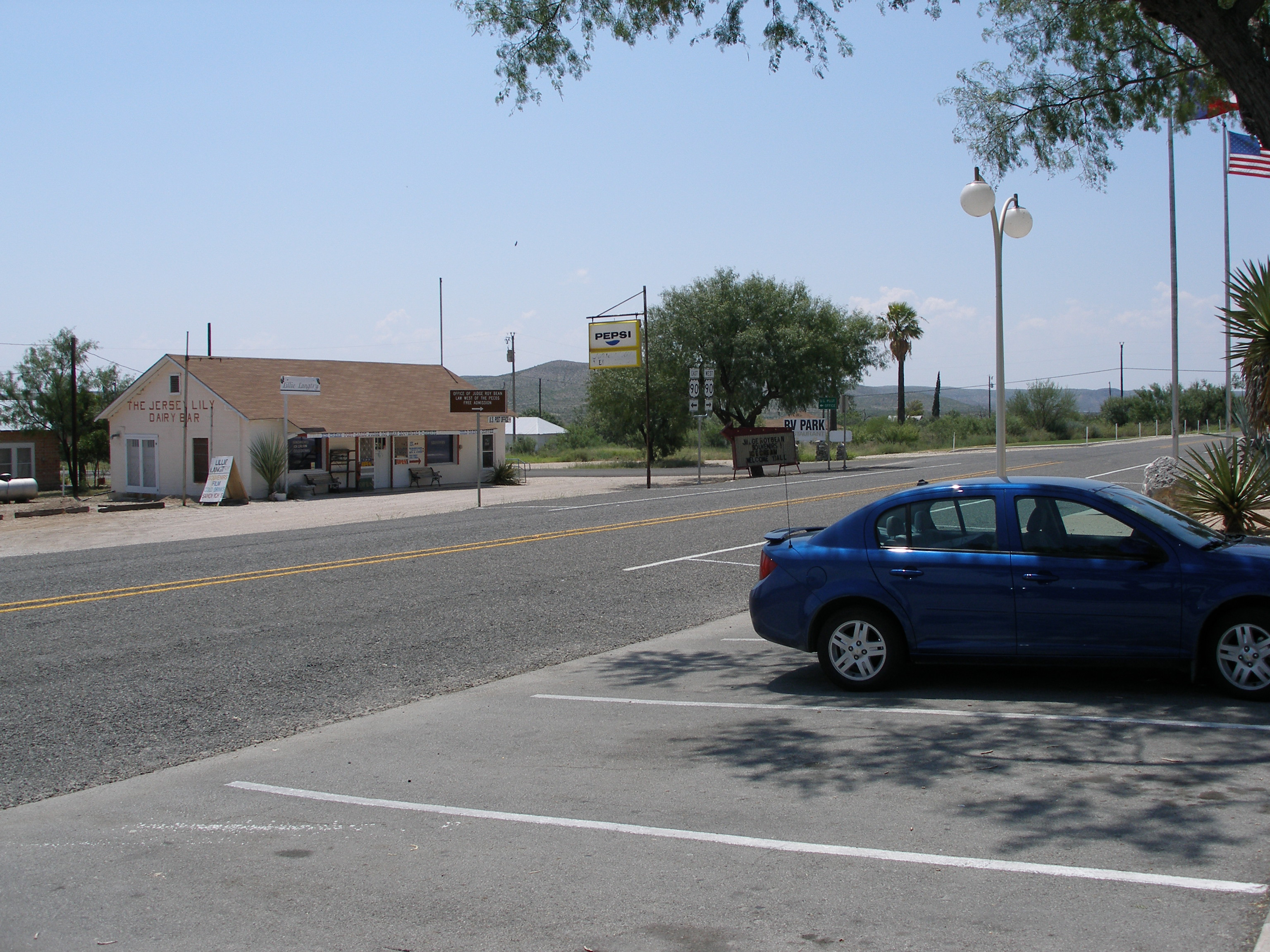
- Main Street in Langtry

- Location within Texas
- Coordinates: 29°48′31″N 101°33′31″W
- Country: United States
- State: Texas
- County: Val Verde
- Established: 1882
- Elevation: 1,289 ft (393 m)

Population (2016)
  - Total: 12
- Time zone: UTC-6 (Central (CST))
  - Summer (DST): UTC-5 (CDT)
- ZIP codes: 78871
- Area code: Area code 830
- GNIS feature ID: 2034106

Langtry is an unincorporated community in Val Verde County, Texas, United States. The community is notable as the place where Judge Roy Bean, the "Law West of the Pecos", had his saloon and practiced law.

== History ==
Langtry was originally established in 1882 by the Southern Pacific Railroad as a grading camp called Eagle Nest. It was later renamed for George Langtry, an engineer and foreman, who supervised the immigrant Chinese work crews building the railroad in the area.

Roy Bean arrived soon after completion of the railroad, and set up a tent saloon on company land. He later built a wooden structure for his saloon, which he called The Jersey Lilly after the well-known British actress Lillie Langtry. She was a native of the island of Jersey. (Née Le Breton, Langtry was her married name, and she was not related to George Langtry.) Bean used the saloon as his headquarters when authorized as a justice of the peace and notary public. He called himself the "Law West of the Pecos". After a notable career as justice of the peace, Bean died in 1903.

In 1884, the town was authorized a post office. In 1892, it had a general store, a railroad depot, and two saloons. Langtry began to decline after the highway was moved slightly north in the early 1900s for a more direct east-west route. Once bypassed, the town's businesses lost revenue and jobs. In the 1920s, Southern Pacific moved its facilities away, more jobs were lost, and the town population dwindled to 50.

By the 1970s, its population dipped as low as 40. Tourism to the Judge Roy Bean Visitor Center continues to keep the town alive.

== Transportation ==
Langtry is located along US 90.

No transportation services directly serve Langtry. The nearest transportation option is service from Amtrak’s Sunset Limited, which passes through the town on Union Pacific tracks on the Sanderson Subdivision, but makes no stop. A stop is located 60 miles (96 km) northwest in Sanderson, or the same distance southeast in Del Rio.

== Education ==
It was formerly in the Langtry Common School District, but sometime prior to 1976 the Langtry district merged into the Comstock Independent School District. In 1964, Langtry's student count exceeded 60.

The entire county is served by Southwest Texas Junior College according to the Texas Education Code.

== Archeology ==
Found on Mile Canyon near Langtry, Bonfire Shelter is an archeological site that has yielded bones from butchered animals, including bison driven to their deaths over the cliff by Native Americans thousands of years ago.

== Popular culture ==
- The Westerner (1940) is a film featuring Walter Brennan as Judge Roy Bean and Gary Cooper as a fictional interloper. It repeated the myth of the town's being named for Lillie Langtry.
- A 1965 episode of the Western series Death Valley Days called "A Picture of a Lady" also depicts Judge Roy Bean renaming a Texas town (called Vinegaroon) as "Langtry" in honor of Lillie Langtry. It stars Peter Whitney as Judge Roy Bean.
- Lillie (1978), a TV miniseries about Lillie Langtry, was produced by Britain's London Weekend Television, also related the myth of the Texas town's name.
- Judge Roy Bean (1955–1956), a Western television series set in Langtry, but filmed in Pioneertown, California, aired in syndication with Edgar Buchanan in the title role.
- The Life and Times of Judge Roy Bean (1972), a film set in Langtry and starring Paul Newman, sparked new interest in Texas history.
- The Wild Bunch (1969) has a passing reference to Langtry as a place where Freddie Sykes (Edmond O'Brien) had been active as a desperado many years before the events depicted the film.
- Roy Bean appears as a main character in Le Juge, part of the Lucky Luke series.
- The Other Roswell: UFO Crash on the Texas-Mexico Border (2008) is a nonfiction book about a reported UFO crash at Langtry in 1955.
- The town plays a major role in R.A. Lafferty's science-fiction novel Fourth Mansions.
- Langtry is mentioned in the Cormac McCarthy novel No Country for Old Men. Langtry could be the hometown of the novel's protagonist Llewelyn Moss.
- Langtry and the surrounding area have long been favorite hunting grounds for legions of amateur and professional herpetologists looking for a variety of reptiles endemic to the area.
- Langtry inspired the fictional town of Langtree in the video game Wandersong.

== Climate ==
Langtry has a hot semi-arid (Köppen: BSh) climate.

Climate data for Langtry, TX (1991-2020 normals, extremes 1897-2022)
| Month | Jan | Feb | Mar | Apr | May | Jun | Jul | Aug | Sep | Oct | Nov | Dec | Year |
|---|---|---|---|---|---|---|---|---|---|---|---|---|---|
| Record high °F (°C) | 93 (34) | 100 (38) | 100 (38) | 110 (43) | 110 (43) | 113 (45) | 111 (44) | 113 (45) | 112 (44) | 104 (40) | 99 (37) | 90 (32) | 113 (45) |
| Mean maximum °F (°C) | 81.4 (27.4) | 87.6 (30.9) | 92.6 (33.7) | 100.0 (37.8) | 104.0 (40.0) | 105.5 (40.8) | 105.4 (40.8) | 106.0 (41.1) | 101.8 (38.8) | 96.3 (35.7) | 87.3 (30.7) | 79.9 (26.6) | 108.7 (42.6) |
| Mean daily maximum °F (°C) | 64.5 (18.1) | 69.7 (20.9) | 77.3 (25.2) | 85.3 (29.6) | 91.8 (33.2) | 96.9 (36.1) | 98.4 (36.9) | 99.0 (37.2) | 92.8 (33.8) | 83.9 (28.8) | 72.5 (22.5) | 65.0 (18.3) | 83.1 (28.4) |
| Daily mean °F (°C) | 50.2 (10.1) | 55.4 (13.0) | 63.6 (17.6) | 71.7 (22.1) | 79.7 (26.5) | 85.6 (29.8) | 87.4 (30.8) | 87.7 (30.9) | 81.3 (27.4) | 71.5 (21.9) | 59.6 (15.3) | 51.1 (10.6) | 70.4 (21.3) |
| Mean daily minimum °F (°C) | 35.9 (2.2) | 41.0 (5.0) | 49.9 (9.9) | 58.1 (14.5) | 67.6 (19.8) | 74.3 (23.5) | 76.4 (24.7) | 76.4 (24.7) | 69.8 (21.0) | 59.0 (15.0) | 46.7 (8.2) | 37.1 (2.8) | 57.7 (14.3) |
| Mean minimum °F (°C) | 24.4 (−4.2) | 26.9 (−2.8) | 32.7 (0.4) | 41.7 (5.4) | 54.1 (12.3) | 66.1 (18.9) | 69.8 (21.0) | 69.4 (20.8) | 56.6 (13.7) | 41.0 (5.0) | 30.3 (−0.9) | 24.7 (−4.1) | 21.5 (−5.8) |
| Record low °F (°C) | 3 (−16) | −4 (−20) | 15 (−9) | 28 (−2) | 41 (5) | 45 (7) | 55 (13) | 52 (11) | 39 (4) | 24 (−4) | 14 (−10) | 9 (−13) | −4 (−20) |
| Average precipitation inches (mm) | 0.60 (15) | 0.55 (14) | 0.91 (23) | 0.84 (21) | 1.81 (46) | 1.84 (47) | 1.60 (41) | 1.43 (36) | 1.99 (51) | 1.68 (43) | 0.68 (17) | 0.36 (9.1) | 14.29 (363.1) |
| Average snowfall inches (cm) | 0.2 (0.51) | 0.0 (0.0) | 0.0 (0.0) | 0.0 (0.0) | 0.0 (0.0) | 0.0 (0.0) | 0.0 (0.0) | 0.0 (0.0) | 0.0 (0.0) | 0.0 (0.0) | 0.0 (0.0) | 0.0 (0.0) | 0.2 (0.51) |
| Average precipitation days (≥ 0.01 in) | 3.2 | 2.6 | 3.1 | 2.7 | 4.5 | 3.3 | 2.6 | 3.4 | 4.1 | 3.5 | 2.8 | 2.3 | 38.1 |
| Average snowy days (≥ 0.1 in) | 0.0 | 0.0 | 0.0 | 0.0 | 0.0 | 0.0 | 0.0 | 0.0 | 0.0 | 0.0 | 0.0 | 0.0 | 0 |
Source: NOAA

== Gallery ==
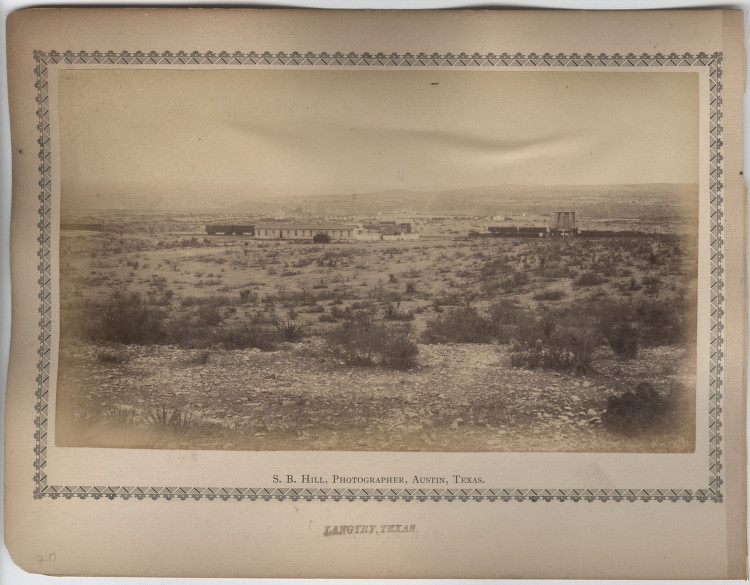
Langtry ca. 1880s.

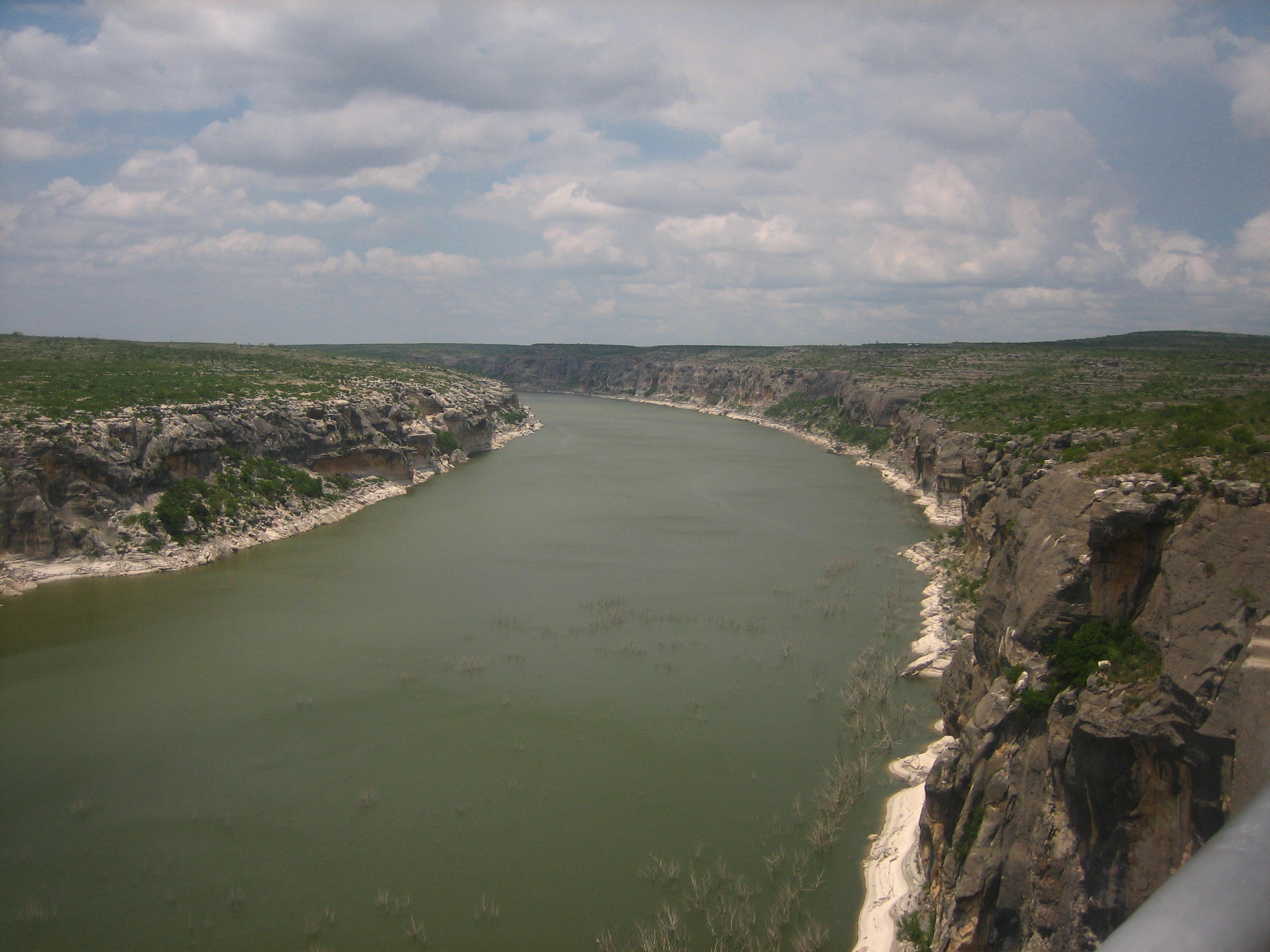
Scenic Pecos River east of Langtry: Judge Roy Bean claimed to have been "The Law West of the Pecos".

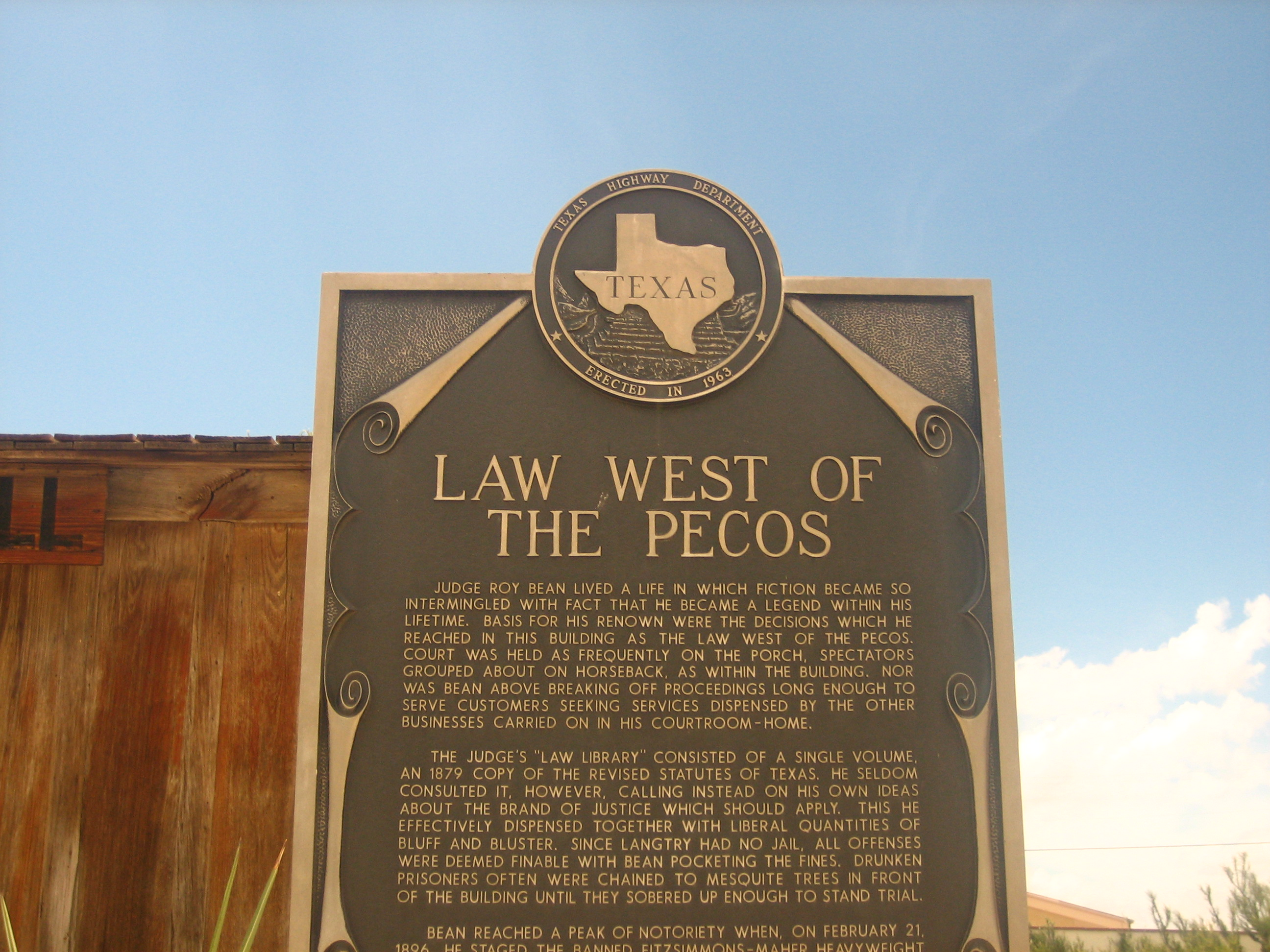
Judge Bean historical marker in Langtry

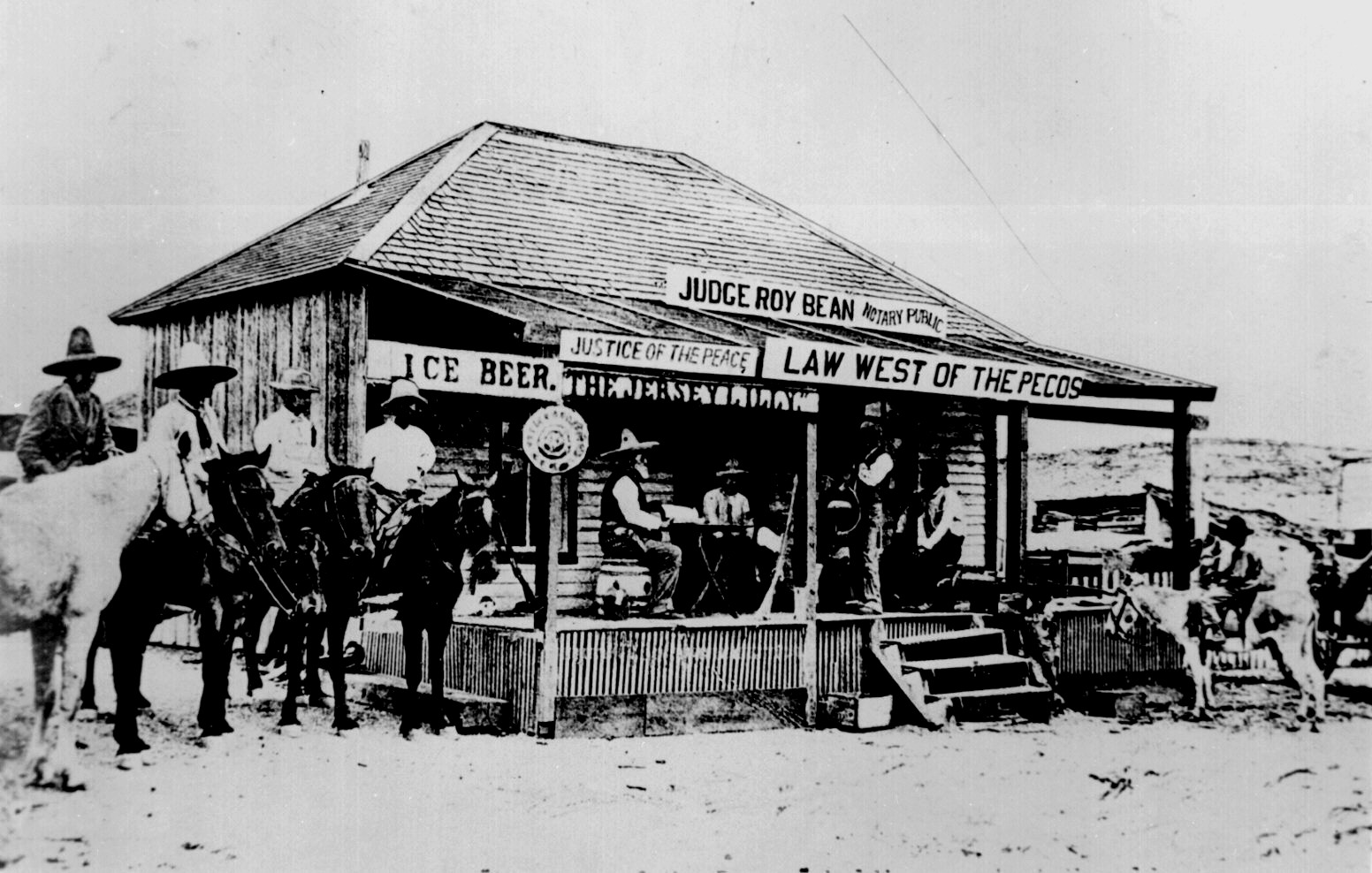
Judge Roy Bean holding court at The Jersey Lilly

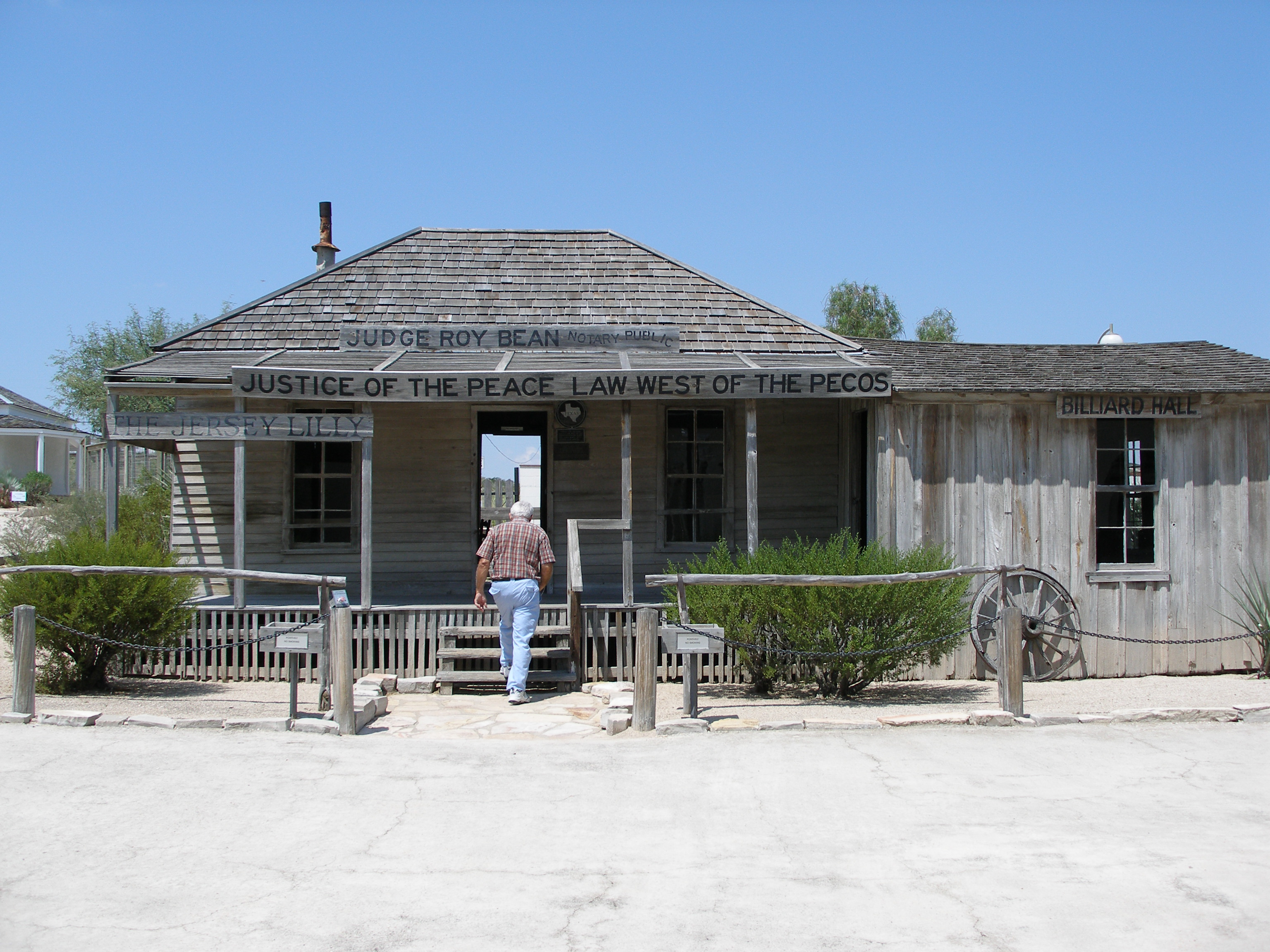
The Jersey Lilly saloon (September 2005)

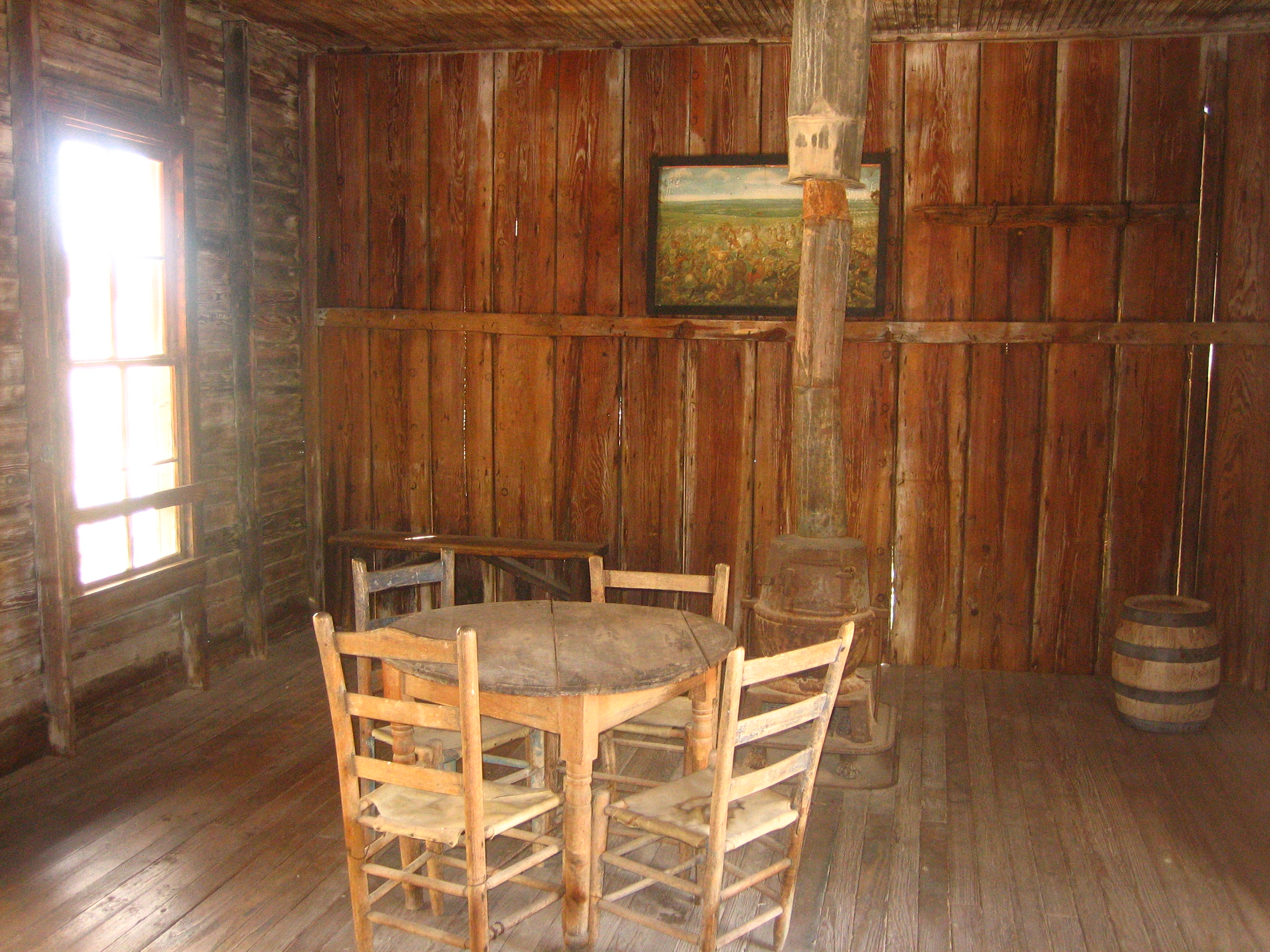
Inside Judge Bean's saloon in Langtry

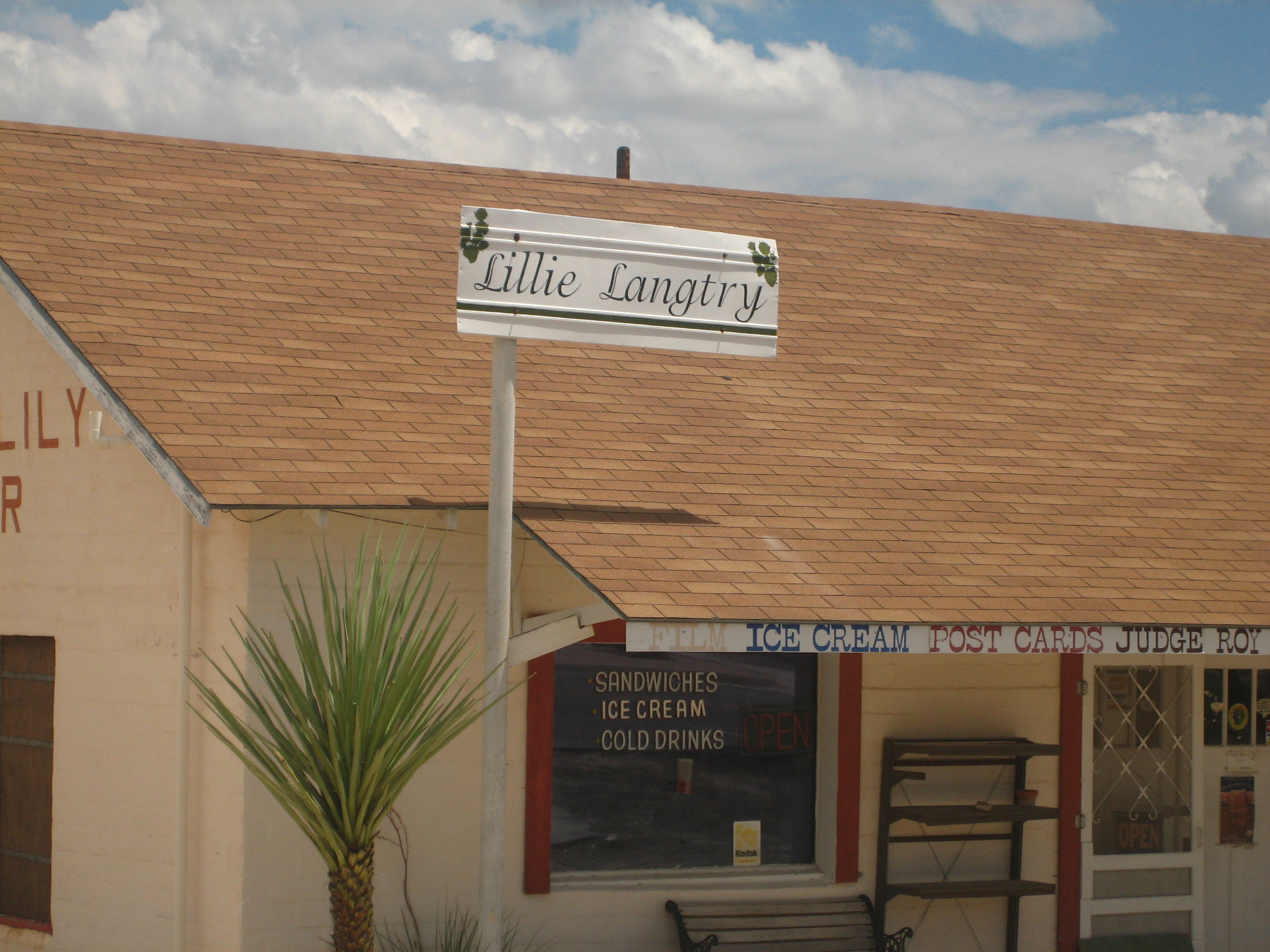
A restaurant named for Lillie Langtry in Langtry, Texas

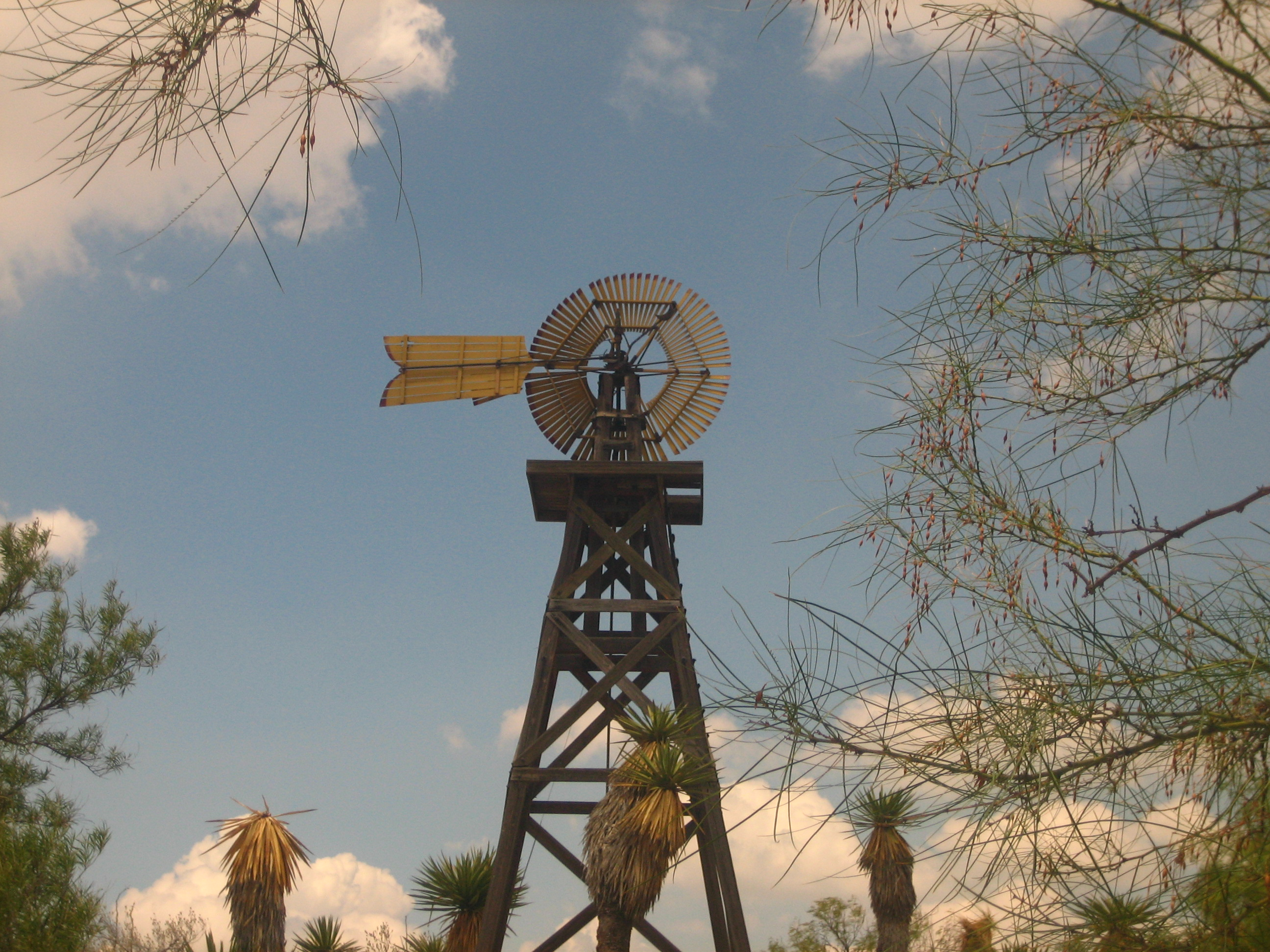
The windmill at the Judge Roy Bean Visitor Center

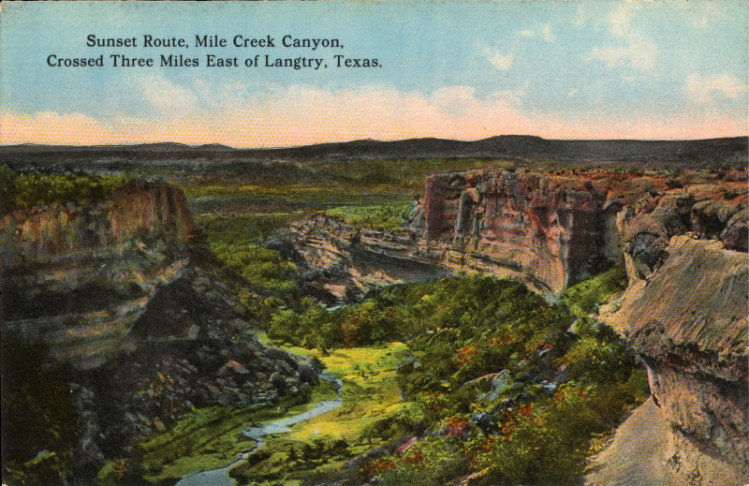
Sunset Route, Mile Creek Canyon (3 miles east of Langtry, Texas, postcard, circa 1908)

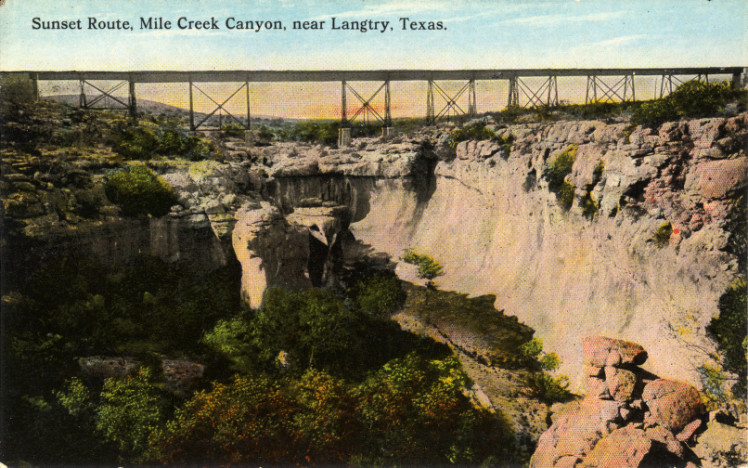
Sunset Route (postcard, circa 1908)
