= Roy Bean =

American judge (c. 1825 – 1903)

Judge Roy Bean
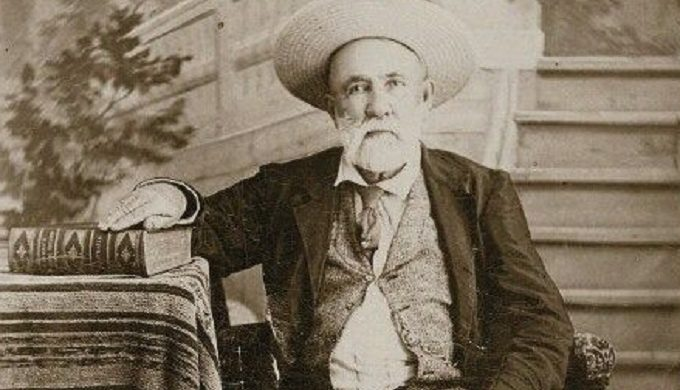
- Born: Phantly Roy Bean Jr. 1825; Mason County, Kentucky, U.S.
- Died: March 16, 1903 (aged 77–78); Langtry, Texas, U.S.
- Burial place: Whitehead Memorial Museum; Del Rio, Texas; 29.3517°N 100.8980°W
- Other name: "Only Law West of the Pecos"
- Occupations: Justice of the Peace/Coroner/Notary Public; Saloon keeper
- Years active: 1882–1903
- Spouse: Virginia Chavez (divorced)
- Children: 4
- Relatives: Joshua Bean (brother)

Phantly Roy Bean Jr. (c. 1825 – March 16, 1903) was an American saloon-keeper and justice of the peace in Val Verde County, Texas, who called himself "the Only Law West of the Pecos." He held court in his saloon along the Rio Grande in a desolate stretch of the Chihuahuan Desert. Legend records his jurisprudence as thoroughly abnormal and in many instances, comical. Although remembered as a hanging judge who said, "hang 'em first and try 'em later," he never had anyone hanged.

== Early life ==
Roy Bean was born around 1825 in Mason County, Kentucky, and was the namesake and youngest of five children (four sons and a daughter) of Phantly Roy Bean Sr. (November 21, 1804 – June 13, 1844) and the former Anna Henderson Gore. The family was extremely poor; at age 16, Bean left home to ride a flatboat to New Orleans, hoping to find work.

After getting into trouble in New Orleans, Bean fled to San Antonio to join his elder brother Sam. Samuel Gore "Sam" Bean (1819–1903), who had earlier migrated to Independence, Missouri, was a teamster and bullwhacker. He hauled freight to Santa Fe and then on to Chihuahua, Mexico. Sam had moved out of San Antonio after fighting in the Mexican–American War.

In 1848, the two brothers opened a trading post in the Mexican state of Chihuahua. Soon after, Roy Bean shot and killed a Mexican desperado who had threatened "to kill a gringo". To escape being charged with murder by Mexican authorities, Roy and Sam Bean fled west to Sonora, Mexico. By the spring of 1849, Roy Bean had moved to San Diego, California, to live with his elder brother Joshua Bean. The latter was elected the first mayor of San Diego the following year, after California became part of the Union.

Considered handsome, Bean competed for the attentions of various local women. A Scotsman named John Collins challenged Bean to a pistol-shooting match on horseback. Bean was left to choose the targets and decided that they would shoot at each other. The duel was fought on February 24, 1852, and ended with Collins receiving a wound to his right arm. Both men were arrested and charged with assault with intent to murder.

In the two months that he was in jail, Bean received many gifts of flowers, food, wine, and cigars from women in San Diego. Some of the final gifts he received were knives encased in tamales. Bean used the knives to dig through the cell wall and escape on April 17, 1852. He fled to San Gabriel, California, where he became a bartender in his elder brother Joshua's "Headquarters Saloon". After Joshua was murdered in November 1852, Bean inherited the saloon. In 1854, Bean courted a young woman who was subsequently kidnapped and forced to marry a Mexican officer. Bean challenged the groom to a duel and killed him. Six of the dead man's friends put Bean on a horse and tied a noose around his neck, leaving him to hang when the horse moved. When he was hanged, the rope stretched and Bean was able to stay alive. The bride, who had been hiding behind a tree, cut the rope, freeing him and saving his life. This experience left Bean with a permanent rope burn and a stiff neck for the rest of his life.

Shortly thereafter, Bean chose to leave California and migrated to New Mexico to live with Sam, who had been elected the first sheriff of Doña Ana County.

In 1861, Samuel G. and Roy Bean operated a store and saloon on Main Street in Pinos Altos (just north of Silver City) in present-day Grant County, New Mexico. It advertised liquor and "a fine billiard table". Roy's cannon, which had been used to repel an Apache assault on the town, was displayed in front of the store.

== Move to Texas ==
During the Civil War, the Confederate Army had invaded New Mexico. During the Battle of Glorieta Pass in March 1862, the Confederates lost their supply wagons and were forced to retreat to San Antonio. After taking money from his brother's safe, Bean joined the retreating army. For the remainder of the war, he ran the naval blockade by hauling cotton from San Antonio to British ships off the coast at Matamoros and returning with needed supplies. For the next 20 years, Bean lived in San Antonio, working nominally as a teamster. During this time, he attempted to run a firewood business by cutting down a neighbor's timber. He then tried to run a dairy business, but was soon caught watering down the milk. Bean later worked as a butcher, rustling unbranded cattle from other area ranchers for his business.

On October 28, 1866, he married 18-year-old Virginia Chavez. Within a year after being married, he was arrested for aggravated assault and threatening his wife's life. Despite the tumultuous marriage, they had four children together: Roy Jr., Laura, Zulema, and Sam. The family lived a "poor area of San Antonio named for him....called Beanville". Beanville would have been centered near the present-day corner of South Flores Street and Glenn Avenue, not far from Burbank High School. By the late 1870s, Bean was operating a saloon in Beanville and had heard that many construction camps were opening as several railroad companies were working to extend the railroads west. A storeowner in Beanville "was so anxious to have this unscrupulous character out of the neighborhood" that she bought all of Bean's possessions for $900 so he could leave San Antonio. At the time, Bean and his wife were separated and he had left his children with friends as he prepared to go west.

=== Justice of the peace ===
With the money he received, Bean purchased a tent, some supplies to sell, and ten 55-gallon barrels of whiskey. By the spring of 1882, he had established a small saloon near the Pecos River in a tent city he named Vinegaroon. Within 20 miles (32 km) of the tent city were 8,000 railroad workers. The nearest court was 120 miles (190 km) away at Fort Stockton, and few means existed to stop illegal activity. A Texas Ranger requested that a local law jurisdiction be set up in Vinegaroon, and on August 2, 1882, Bean was appointed justice of the peace for the new Precinct 6 in Pecos County. His first case, however, had been heard earlier, on 25 July 1882, when Texas Rangers brought in Joe Bell to be tried.

One of his first acts as a justice of the peace was to "shoot [...] up the saloon shack of a Jewish competitor". Bean then turned his tent saloon into a part-time courtroom and began calling himself "the Only Law West of the Pecos". As a judge, Bean relied on a single law book, the 1879 edition of the Revised Statutes of Texas, and when newer law books showed up, he used them as kindling. Bean did not allow hung juries or appeals. Jurors, who were chosen from his best bar customers, were expected to buy a drink during every court recess. He was also known for his unusual rulings. In one case, an Irishman named Paddy O'Rourke shot a Chinese laborer. During the trial, a mob of 200 angry Irishmen surrounded the courtroom and saloon, threatening to lynch Bean if O'Rourke were not freed. After looking through his law book, Bean ruled that "homicide was the killing of a human being; however, he could find no law against killing a Chinaman" and subsequently dismissed the case.

By December 1882, railroad construction had moved farther westward, and Bean moved his courtroom and saloon 70 miles (110 km) to Strawbridge (now Sanderson). He sent for his children, who then lived with him at the saloon, with his youngest son Sam sleeping on a pool table. A competitor who was already established in the area laced Bean's whiskey with kerosene. Unable to attract customers, Bean left the area and moved to Eagle's Nest, 20 miles (32 km) west of the Pecos River, which was soon renamed Langtry.

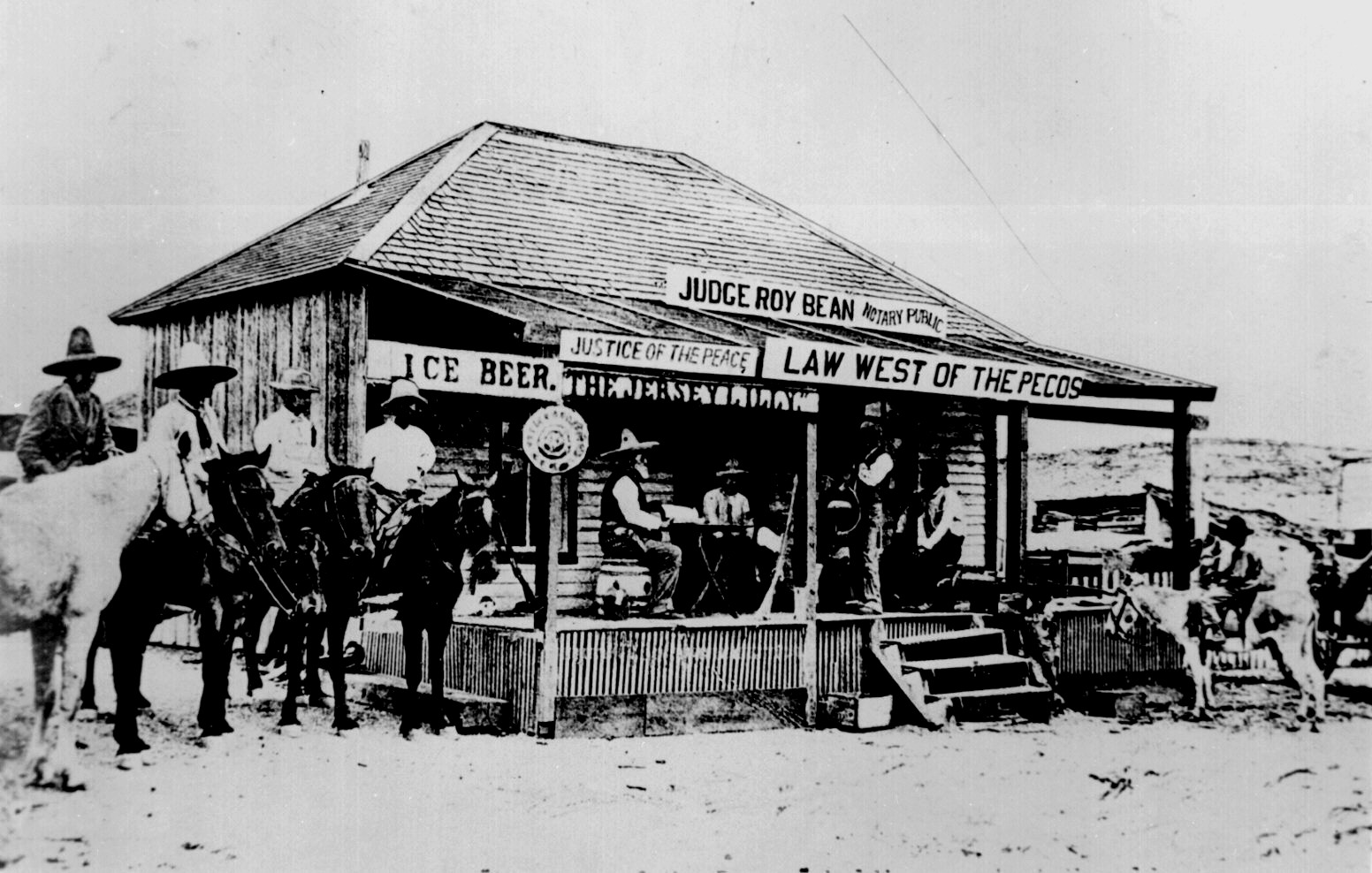
Roy Bean holding court while sitting on a barrel and holding his law book at his Jersey Lilly Saloon, 1900s

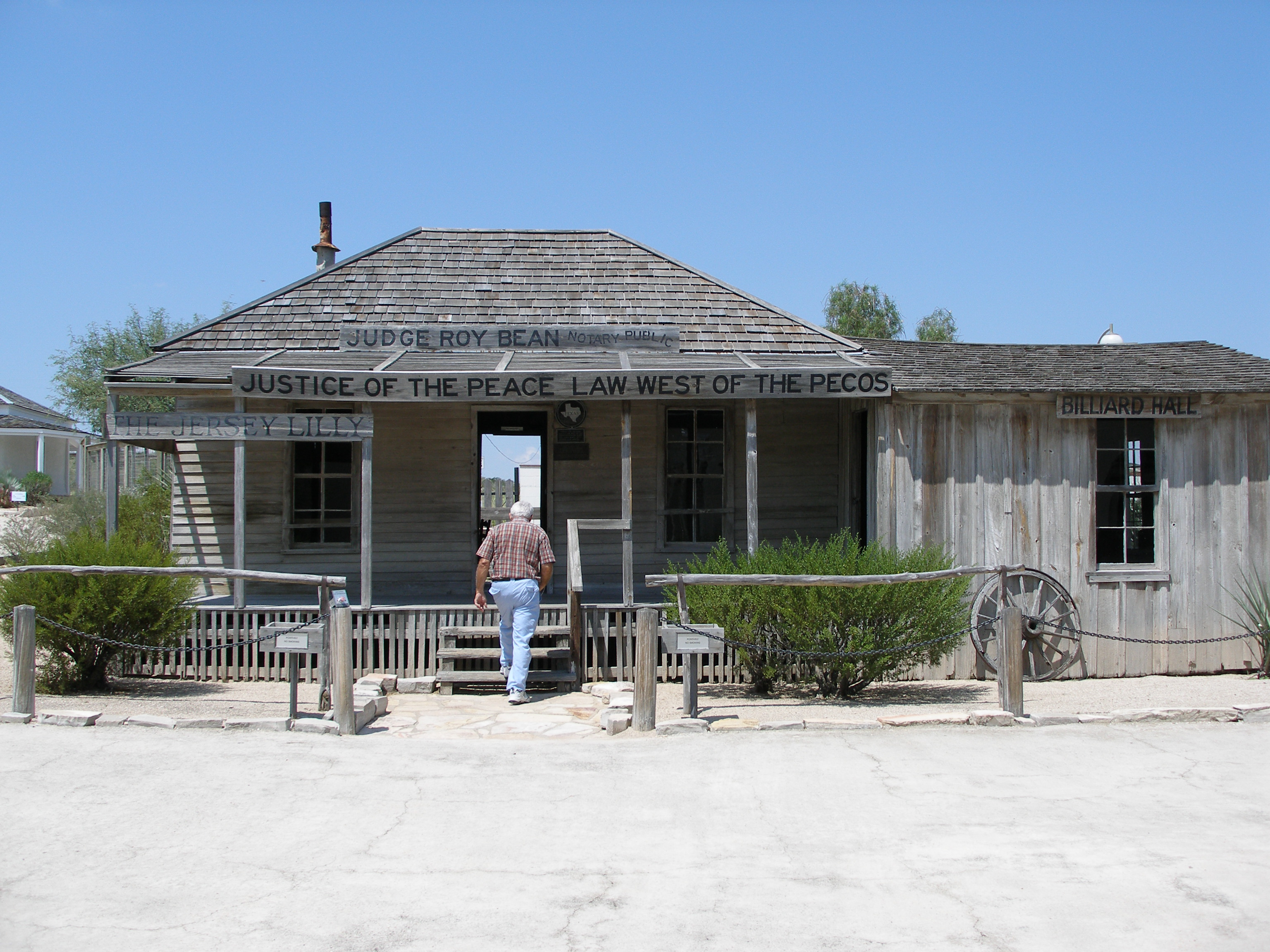
The Jersey Lilly Saloon in September 2005

The original owner of the land, who ran a saloon, had sold 640 acres (2.59 km^{2}) to the railroad on the condition that no part of the land could be sold or leased to Bean. O'Rourke, the Irishman whose case Bean had previously dismissed, told Bean to use the railroad right-of-way, which was not covered by the contract, and for the next 20 years, Bean squatted on land he had no legal right to use. Bean supposedly named his new saloon the Jersey Lilly in honor of Lillie Langtry, who recounted in her autobiography that she had visited the area after Bean's death. She did, however, send to Bean a pair of Colt .45 pistols. Langtry did not have a jail – although it is reported that outside the Jersey Lilly was a large oak tree with a heavy log chain that served as a "jail" for those unable to pay their fines; fines settled all cases. Bean refused to send the state any part of the fines, and kept all of the money. In most cases, the fines were made for the exact amount the accused person was carrying.

Bean was noted for his unusual verdicts, some of which are reported to have been:

- Upon finding the corpse of a Southern Pacific railroad workman who had been killed after he fell from a high bridge over the Pecos River, the man having been carrying a pistol in his pocket and $40 on his person when he had died, the judge rendered a verdict of accidental death and then imposed a posthumous $40 fine (a $20 fine upon the man for having carried the concealed weapons. Bean, whose court/saloon was in need of money at the time, and was also a coroner, collected a burial fee of $10 and $10 in court costs).
- When a train passenger tossed a $20 gold piece for a beer, Bean refused to give any change. When the stranger protested, Bean fined him $19.95 for contempt of court and threatened to double the fine if the stranger said another word; the stranger left on a train.
- Although only district courts were legally allowed to grant divorces, Bean did so anyway, and pocketed $10 for each divorce. He charged $5 for weddings, and ended all wedding ceremonies with the phrase "and may God have mercy on your souls" (a traditional saying when a death sentence is carried out). After Bean performed the marriage of two Mexican couples, they later came before Bean and asked to be divorced and remarried to the other person's spouses; Bean agreed to the demand, charging each $10 for the marriages and $40 for the divorces.
- When a Mexican man received permission for one day off from his boss to marry his future wife, but did not have enough time for a license, Bean married them anyway and proclaimed that the marriage license would arrive by the next day's mail after charging them his usual $5 marriage fee.
- A rival saloon owner named Torrano was brought before Bean on an assault charge; a jury of six men found the accused guilty and fined him two dozen bottles of beer. Bean stopped his rival from buying beer at his own saloon and instead had him pay the fine at the Jersey Lilly.
- A railroad contractor named Howard, who had some law training, was brought into court and read from the latest revised law statutes; Bean remitted the fine, but rendered a verdict that no law books were to be brought into his court.
- When a young ranchman was fined $5 for fighting, he produced witnesses that he had not been fighting, but had held the other person off. Bean remitted the fine, but fined the other man $10 – who had skipped town. The ranchman was committed until the fine was paid; the ranchman paid the fine.

Bean won re-election to his post in 1884, but was defeated in 1886. The following year, the commissioner's court created a new precinct in the county and appointed Bean to be the new justice of the peace. He continued to be re-elected until 1896. Even after the election defeat, he "refused to surrender his seal and law book and continued to try all cases north of the tracks".

- On April 16, 1897, an accidental collision occurred between two trains in which one man was killed and four scalded; Bean presided over an inquest concerning the train wreck of the G.H.& S. Railroad between Bean and Langtry, finding one man had formerly been a fireman on the Southern Pacific Railroad. The dead man was identified as Robert Beckman; Bean had him brought to Langtry and buried in the Langtry graveyard.
- During his term as a judge, Bean is known to have sentenced only two men to hang, one of whom escaped. Horse thieves, who were often sentenced to death in other jurisdictions, were always let go if the horses were returned to their owners. Prior to May 1897 Leslie's Weekly printed an item "The picture in your publication of March 11 of Judge Roy Bean is all right, except the collar and cravat. He was once trying a Mexican on a charge of horse stealing and his charge was the shortest on record: Gentlemen of the Jury, there's a greaser in the box and a hoss missing. You know your duty, and they did.".

== Later years and death ==
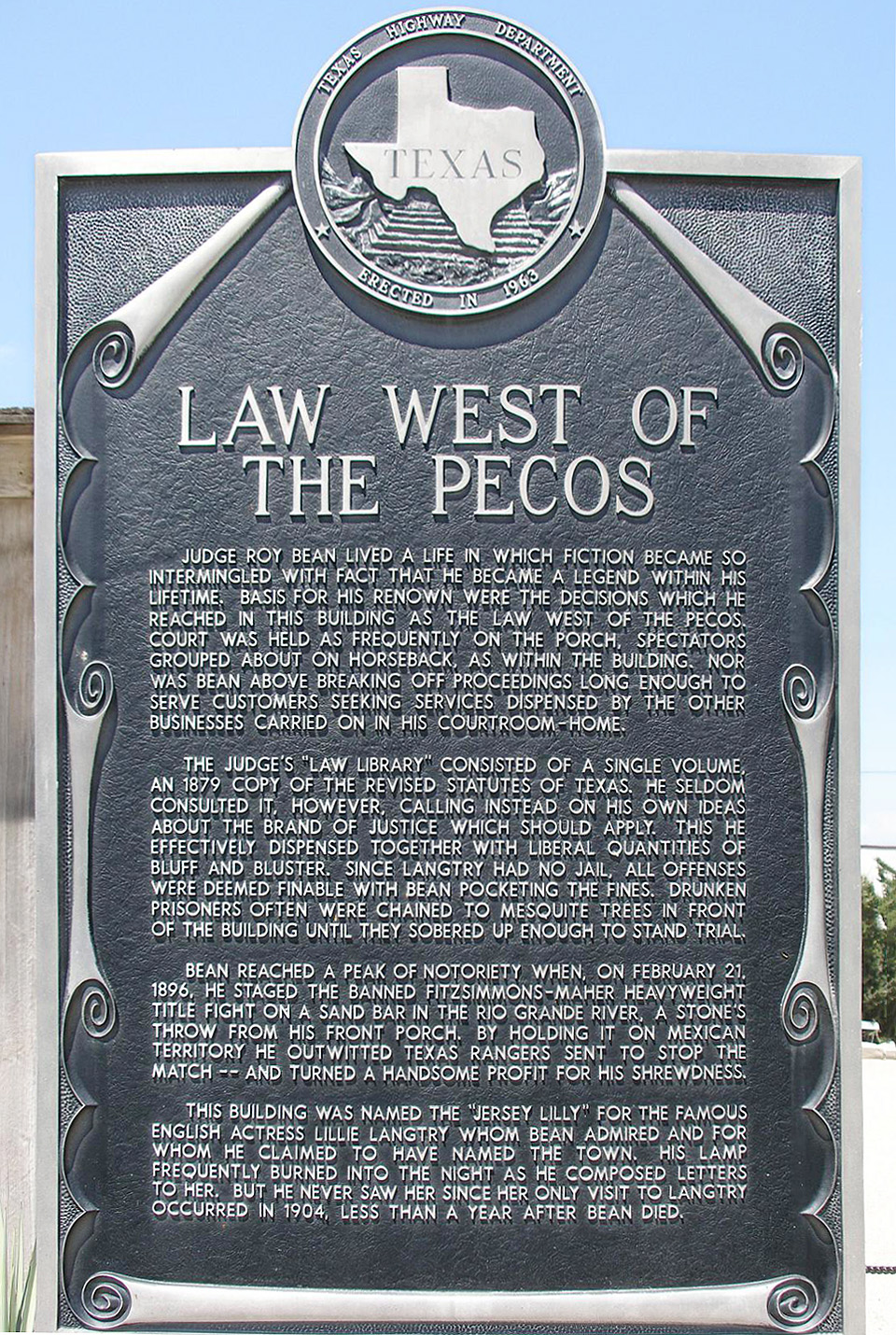
Jersey Lilly historical marker

In 1890, Bean received word that railroad developer and speculator Jay Gould was planning to pass through Langtry on a special train. Bean flagged down the train using a danger signal. Thinking the bridge was out, the train engineer stopped the train. Bean then invited Gould and his daughter to visit the saloon as his guests. The Goulds visited for two hours, causing a brief panic on the New York Stock Exchange when Gould was reported to have been killed in a train crash.

In 1896, Bean organized a world championship boxing title bout between Bob Fitzsimmons and Peter Maher on an island in the Rio Grande because boxing matches were illegal in both Texas and Mexico. The fight, won by Fitzsimmons, lasted only 1 minute and 35 seconds, but the resulting sport reports spread Bean's fame throughout the United States.

As he aged, Bean spent much of his profits helping the poor of the area and always made sure that the local schoolhouse had free firewood in the winter. In January 1901, Bean stated that a claim for damages of $13,000 from Apache depredations of his mules would certainly be allowed.

Bean died in his bed on March 16, 1903, after a bout of heavy drinking in San Antonio. His son, Sam Bean (1874–1907), and he are interred at the Whitehead Memorial Museum in Del Rio. In 1965, as part of the Civil War Centennial commemoration in Texas, an official Texas Historical Marker honoring Bean was erected on the museum grounds.

== In popular culture ==
Films

- The Westerner, a 1940 film directed by William Wyler and starring Gary Cooper, features Roy Bean (played by Walter Brennan) as one of the main characters, for which Brennan won a Best Supporting Actor Academy Award. The movie gives Bean an entirely fictitious death scene.
- A Time for Dying was a 1969 film portraying his time in Vinegarroon; Audie Murphy starred as Jesse James and Victor Jory played a half-crazed Judge Roy Bean.
- The Life and Times of Judge Roy Bean (1972), a heavily fictionalized comedy-drama film, starring Paul Newman as Bean.

Television

- Judge Roy Bean is a fictionalized 1955 syndicated television series. Edgar Buchanan portrayed Bean.
- In the episode "Law West of the Pecos" (June 7, 1959) of the ABC/Warner Bros. Western television series, Colt .45, Frank Ferguson is cast as Judge Bean. Lisa Gaye portrays June Webster and Douglas Kennedy is cast as Jay Brisco.
- The western anthology series Death Valley Days episode "A Picture of a Lady", first broadcast on December 30, 1965, depicts Lillie Langtry (Francine York) traveling to Langtry after the death of Judge Bean (Peter Whitney). Paul Fix was cast in the episode as Bean's friend Doc Lathrop.
- In another Death Valley Days episode, "A Sense of Justice" (1966), Tom Skerritt played a young Bean while he was in San Diego, California, with his older brother, Joshua, played by Tris Coffin. In the story line, Roy is jailed after he gets into a fight with a local man; Joshua is unsympathetic at his brother's plight.
- In a second-season episode of The Monkees, "The Devil and Peter Tork", Billy Beck played Judge Bean, presiding over the trial between Peter and the Devil.
- Lillie (1978), Tommy Duggan played the role in this British miniseries biopic of Lillie Langtry.
- In the Fantasy Island episode "Legends" (1982), Bean was played by Andy Griffith.
- The Gambler: The Luck of the Draw (1991), a television movie starring Kenny Rogers and Reba McEntire, features Brad Sullivan as Judge Roy Bean.
- In the Mathnet episode ""The Case of the Galling Stones" (1991), Pat Tuesday is framed for jewelry theft and her trial is presided over by Judge Roy A. Kidney Bean.
- Streets of Laredo, a 1995 TV mini-series starring James Garner and based on the Larry McMurtry novel of the same name, includes a portrayal of Bean by Ned Beatty.
- Beyond Belief: Fact or Fiction, a television series in which episode 16 (April 24, 1998) features a segment inspired by an actual event, in which the ghost of Judge Bean and his dog were claimed to have cleaned out a cheat's money.
- The Sopranos - Tony refers to one of his capos as Judge Roy Bean in season six because of a rush to judgment about an associate being homosexual.

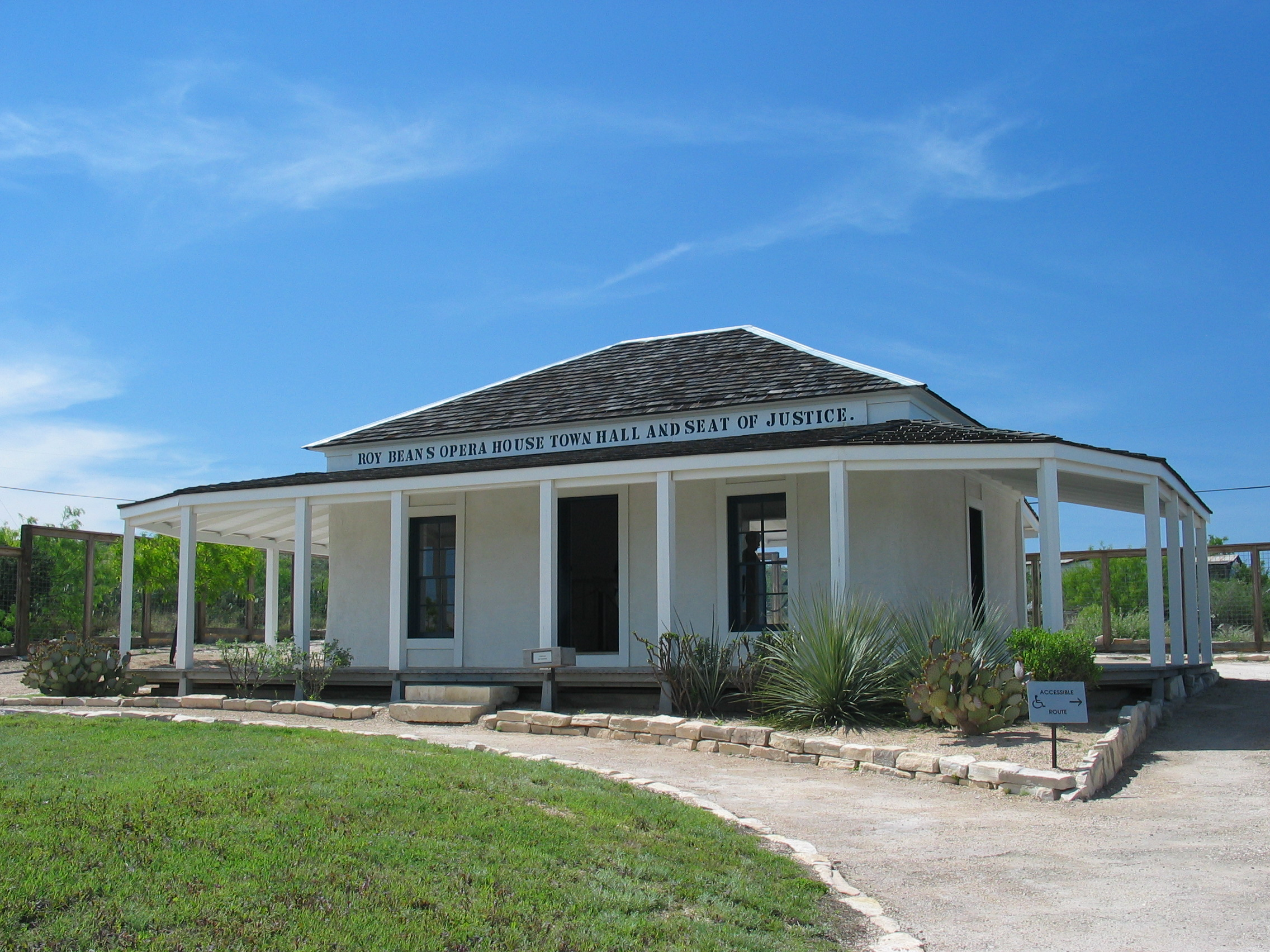
Roy Bean's Opera House in Langtry

Literature

- Echo Burning (2001), a novel by Lee Child, has the main character looking for a grave and sees a replica of Judge Bean's courthouse.
- West of the Pecos (1937), a novel by Zane Grey, features Bean as a minor character.
- Streets of Laredo (1993), a novel by Larry McMurtry depicts a fictionalized version of Judge Roy Bean.
- Roy & Lillie: A Love Story (2010), a novel by Loren D. Estleman, has the fictitious "lost letters" that Judge Bean and Miss Langtry exchanged.
- Vinegarroon : The Saga of Judge Roy Bean "The Law West of the Pecos"(1936) by Ruel McDaniel
- Four Against the West: The True Saga of a Frontier Family That Reshaped the Nation - And Created a Legend (2024), a true saga by Joe Pappalardo

Comics

- Le Juge (The Judge), by Morris and Goscinny, is a Lucky Luke Belgian comic book from 1959.
- Bean encounters a younger Scrooge McDuck in Don Rosa's The Life and Times of Scrooge McDuck.

Video games

- Roy Bean's House of Justice and Jelly Beans in the comedy adventure video game West of Loathing, made by Asymmetric Publications.

Namesake locations

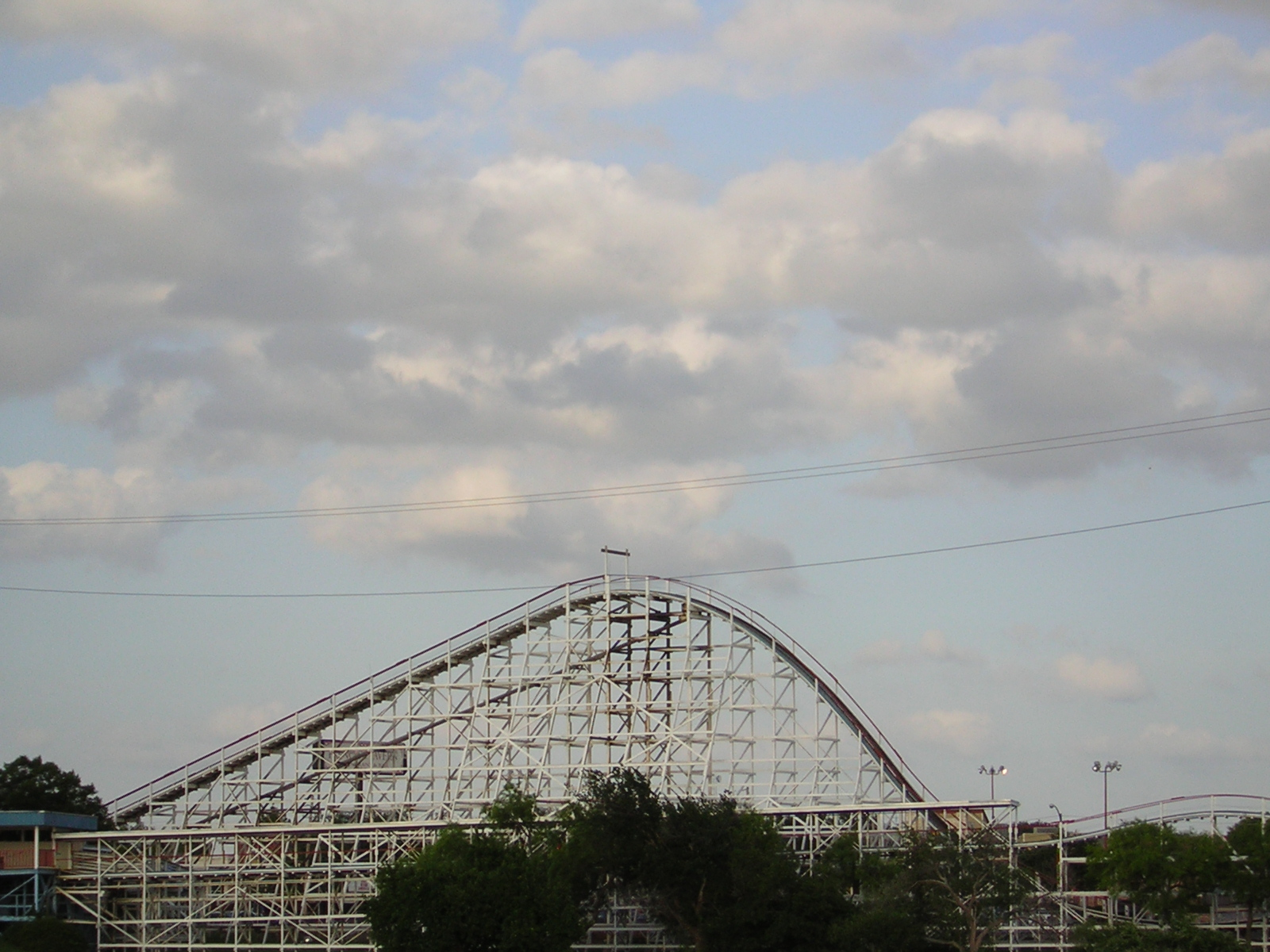
Judge Roy Scream at Six Flags Over Texas

- The wooden roller coaster Judge Roy Scream at Six Flags Over Texas is named for Bean.
- A bar in Daphne, Alabama, named Judge Roy Bean was open from 1976 until 2005, when it was destroyed in a fire. Guests and performers included local artists Wet Willie and Mac McAnally, as well as more popular musicians, such as Fairhope native Jimmy Buffett, as well as Stephen Stills, Leon Russell, Karla Bonoff, Beth Nielsen Chapman, Emmylou Harris, George Thorogood, The Marshall Tucker Band, and The Allman Brothers Band.
- Knott's Berry Farm features a replica of the Jersey Lilly Saloon.
- A bar in Simi Valley, California, is named "Judge Roy Bean's".
- The Judge Roy Bean Saloon in Bristol, Rhode Island.
- A barbecue restaurant in Brentwood, Tennessee, is named Judge Beans, and features Texas-inspired recipes.
- Judge Roy Beans is the name of a steakhouse, bar and music venue in Newbridge, County Kildare, Ireland.
