= Bonfire Shelter =

Archaeological site in Texas, US

Coordinates: 29°49′N 101°33′W

Bonfire Shelter is an archaeological site located in a southwest Texas rock shelter, near Langtry, Texas, US. This archaeological site contains evidence of mass American buffalo hunts, a phenomenon that is usually associated with the Great Plains hundreds of miles to the north. This site is the southernmost site that has been located in North America where mass bison hunts have taken place, and also the earliest known.

== History ==
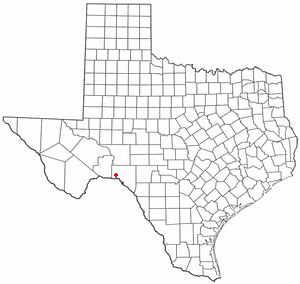
Bonfire Shelter is located in Texas

Bison hunting was performed as "bison jumps" which involved stampeding a herd of bison over a cliff, and then butchering the dead animals. In the shelter, there are two distinct zones of bison bones. Each zone represents several bison jumps over relatively little time, perhaps no more than 50–100 years, but the two zones occurred nearly 7500 years apart. The earlier bones are dated to Paleo-Indian period hunts, while the later occurred in around 500 BC. The site was originally investigated by legendary Texas archaeologist David S. Dibble.

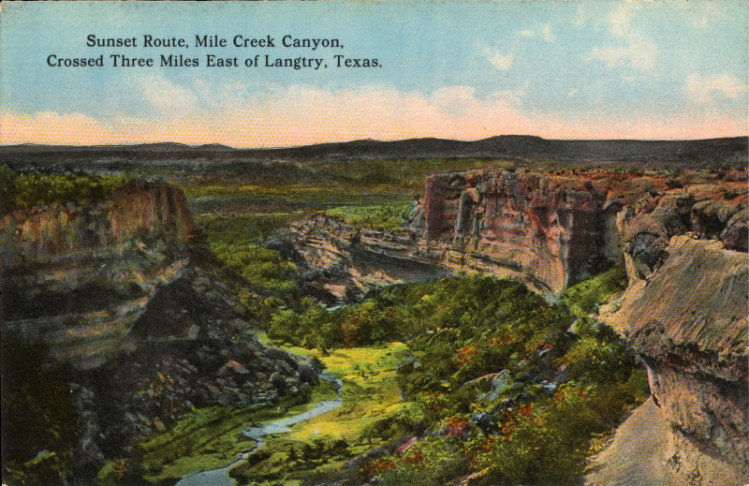
Mile Canyon bison jump site

Archaeologist Vaughn Bryant has investigated this strange lack of intermediate hunts. Using pollen samples, he discovered that the area had seen good grass cover for grazing only twice since 10,000 BC, and that each time coincided with a deposit of bones. At other times, this area was too inhospitable to support large herds of grazing animals. Bonfire Shelter demonstrates the correlation between climatic changes and the archaeological evidence we can find today.

Mile Canyon, where Bonfire Shelter is located, was added to the National Register of Historic Places in 1970 AD. The historic district comprises a 1,500 acre (6 km^{2}) area which is entirely on privately owned land.
