= Behind the News (film) =

1940 film

- Film poster
- Directed by: Joseph Santley
- Written by: Allen Rivkin; Dore Schary
- Produced by: Robert North
- Starring: Lloyd Nolan
- Cinematography: Jack A. Marta
- Edited by: Ernest J. Nims
- Production company: Republic Pictures
- Release date: December 20, 1940
- Running time: 75 minutes
- Country: United States
- Language: English

Behind the News is a 1940 American drama film starring Lloyd Nolan and directed by Joseph Santley. The film was nominated for an Academy Award for Best Sound (Charles L. Lootens). It is also known as A Flagpole Needs a Flag.

== Plot ==
Recently graduated journalist Jeff Flavin gets a scholarship of six months work for The Enquirer.

Jeff gets the most renowned reporter, Stuart Woodrow, as a mentor, upon his arrival to the paper. The editor, Vic Archer, hopes this will jumpstart the old man's spark and steer him back on the road to success where he used to be.

However, the result of the pairing-up gets Jeff a very harsh treatment during his first time at the paper. Stu is reporting on notorious racketeer Harry "Face" Houseman, who many claim have been indicted just because the district attorney, Hardin S. Kelly, wants to be re-elected.

Everything goes wrong with the cooperation between the old and young reporters. Jeff manages to make Stu late for a date with his fiancé Barbara Shaw, who is in fact Kelly's secretary. Stu gets drunk and scolds Jeff, but when Stu is too hungover to cover the story about Face escaping prison, Jeff steps in and does the job.

Jeff starts his investigation of the case, and becomes a witness to murder when Face is shot down in cold blood in his sister's apartment. He reports everything in Stu's name, and the old reporter becomes very grateful. Stu starts caring about Jeff's future career, and is determined to get him out of newspaper reporting, since he deems it unsuitable for a decent man like Jeff.

Stu tricks Jeff to cover a fake story, and the editor is furious when he sees the result, and makes him read funny strips on radio instead of serious reporting. But when Jeff visits the court to meet one of his young listeners, he happens to watch the trial against Face's murderer, Carlos Marquez.

Since Jeff speaks Spanish, he discovers that the interpreter translates the accused man's words wrong, saying that Carlos confesses to the murder, although he doesn't. When Carlos is convicted of the murder, Jeff tries to correct the wrongdoing by telling his editor about it. No one takes him seriously because of the fake story he reported previously, but eventually Stu agrees to help him look into the matter.

Stu, Barbara, and Jeff sneak into the district attorney's office to look for clues. They find evidence that Kelly is corrupt and has been taking bribes for years. Together, they go on to find a witness who can reveal Kelly's involvement in Face's murder and the false conviction of Carlos. When Kelly is arrested, Carlos is released. Jeff continues working as a reporter and also serves as the best man on Stu and Barbara's wedding.

== Cast ==
- Lloyd Nolan as Stuart Woodrow
- Doris Davenport as Barbara Shaw
- Frank Albertson as Jeff Flavin
- Robert Armstrong as Vic Archer
- Paul Harvey as Dist. Atty. Hardin S. Kelly
- Charles Halton as Neil Saunders
- Eddie Conrad as Enrico
- Harry Tyler as Monroe
- Dick Elliott as Foster
- Archie Twitchell as Reporter
- Veda Ann Borg as Bessie
- Milton Parsons as Eddie
