= Whitehead Memorial Museum =

American western museum

Coordinates: 29.3517°N 100.8980°W

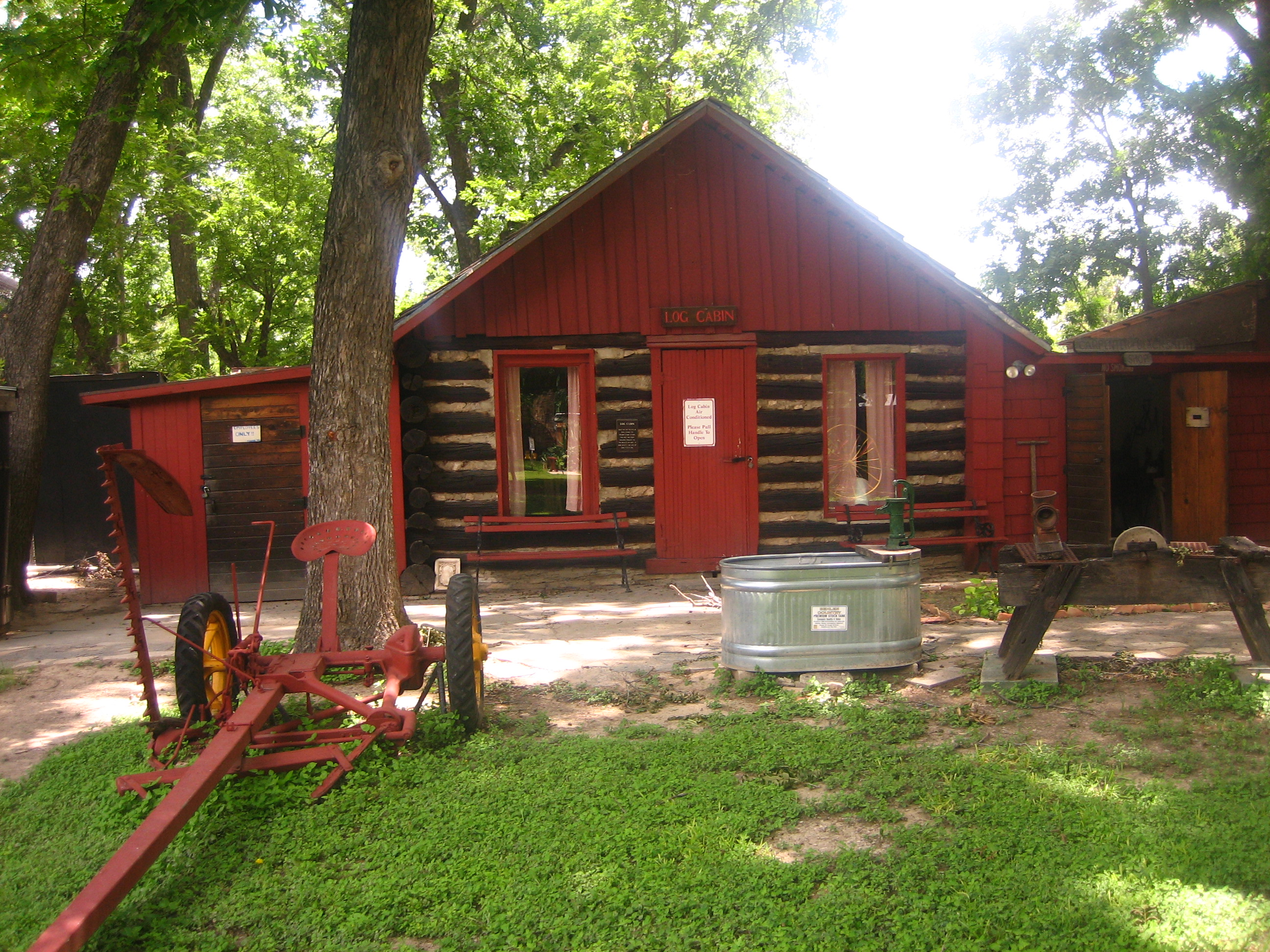
Settlers cabin

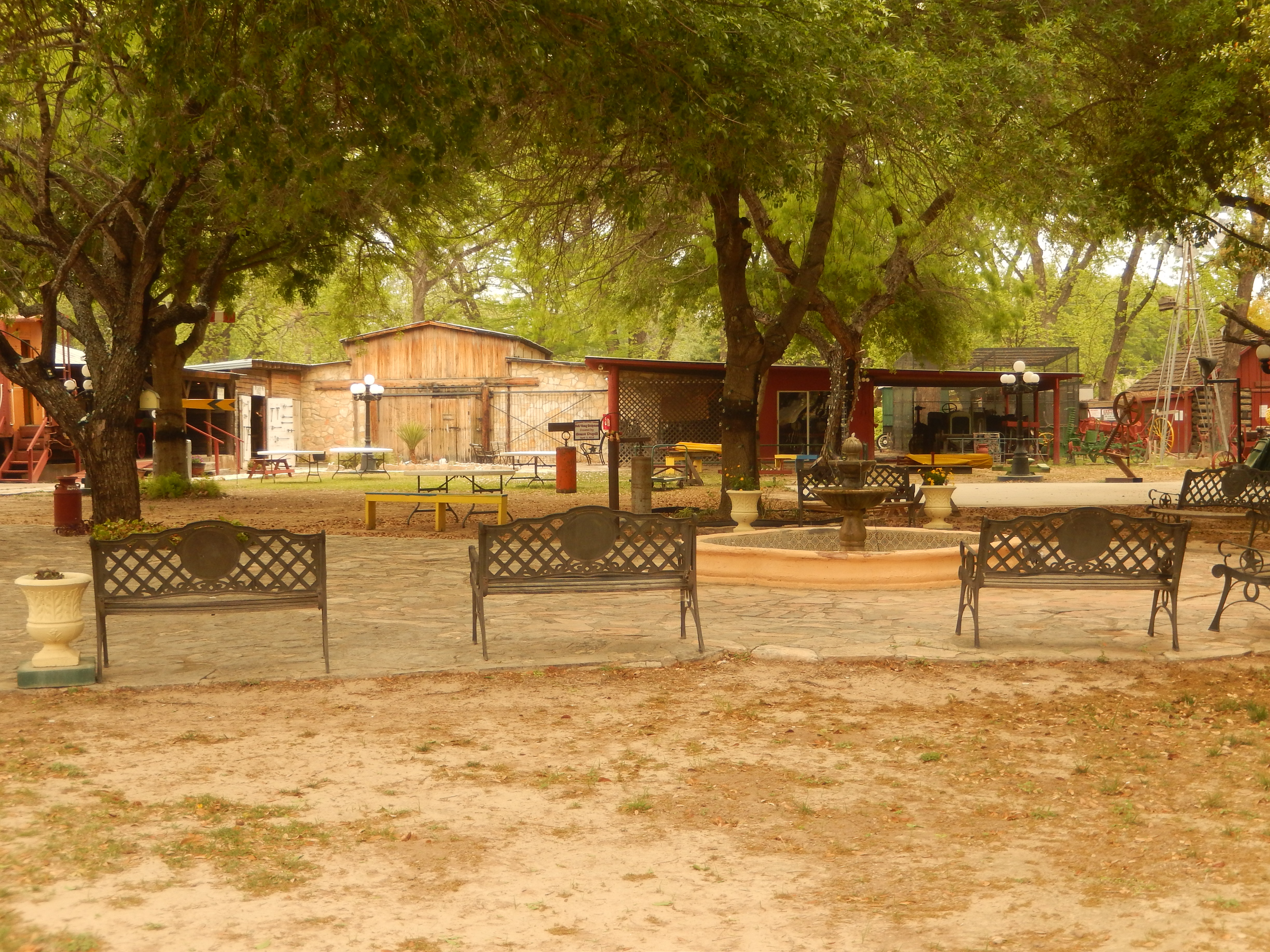
Interior

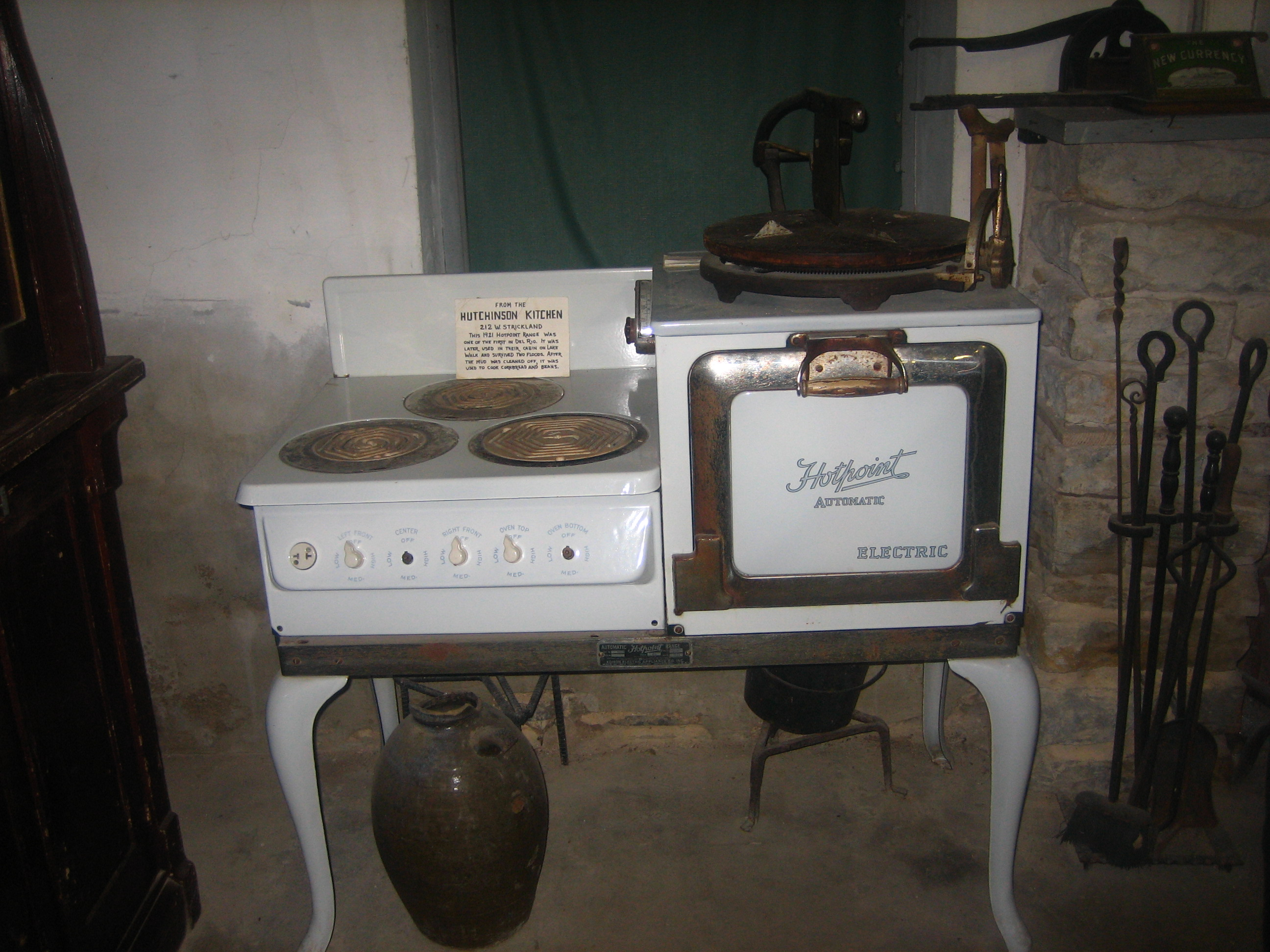
Exhibit of an early stove

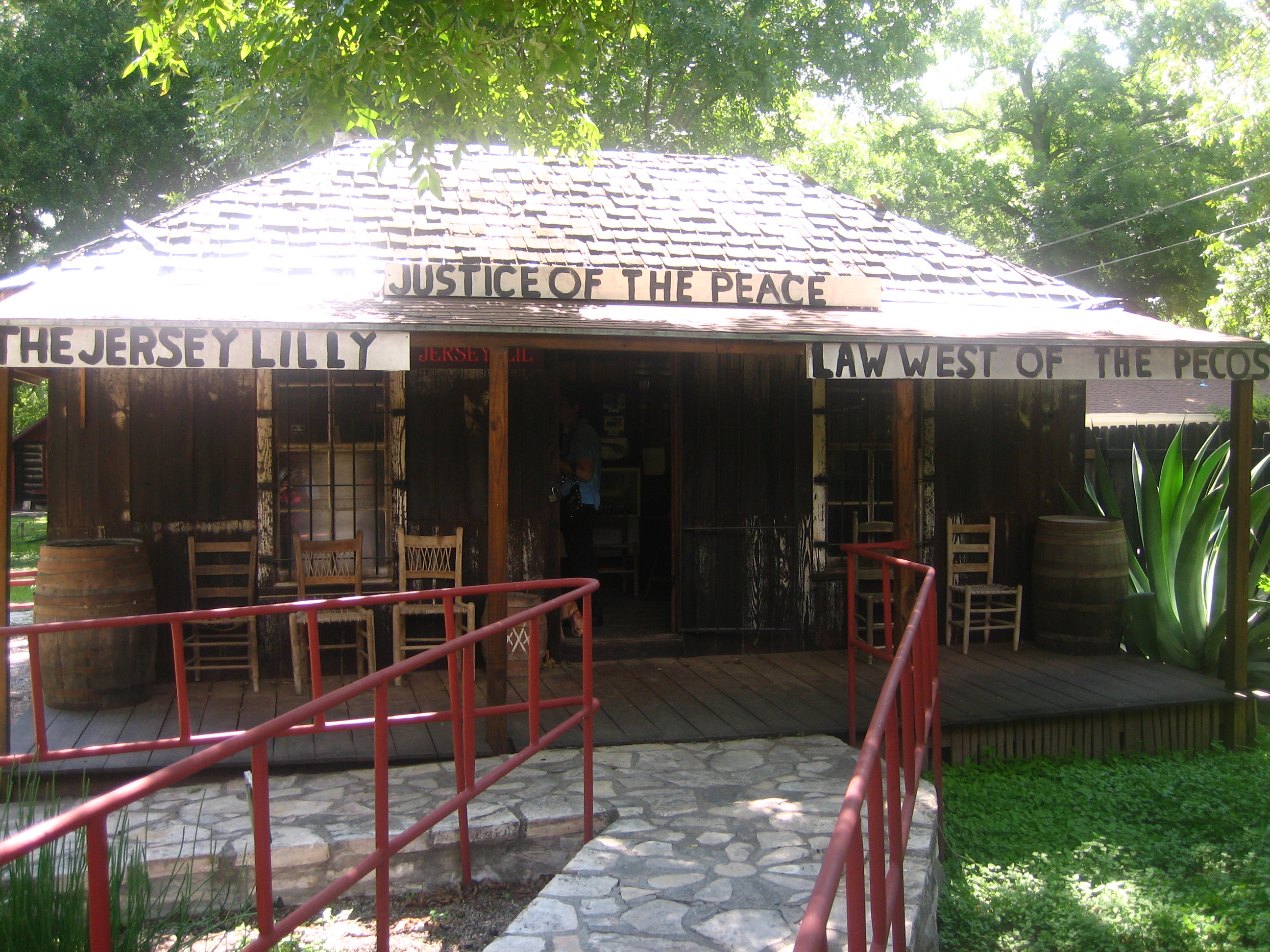
Replica of The Jersey Lilly

The Whitehead Memorial Museum is a western museum located at located at 1308 South Main Street, in Del Rio, Texas. It boasts a replica of "The Jersey Lilly" saloon, and the gravesites of Judge Roy Bean and his son Sam, the latter of whom "was killed there in a street fight". The two-and-a-half acre property was donated to the city and county for by the Del Rio ranching family in 1962.
