= Doris Davenport =

American actress (1917–1980)

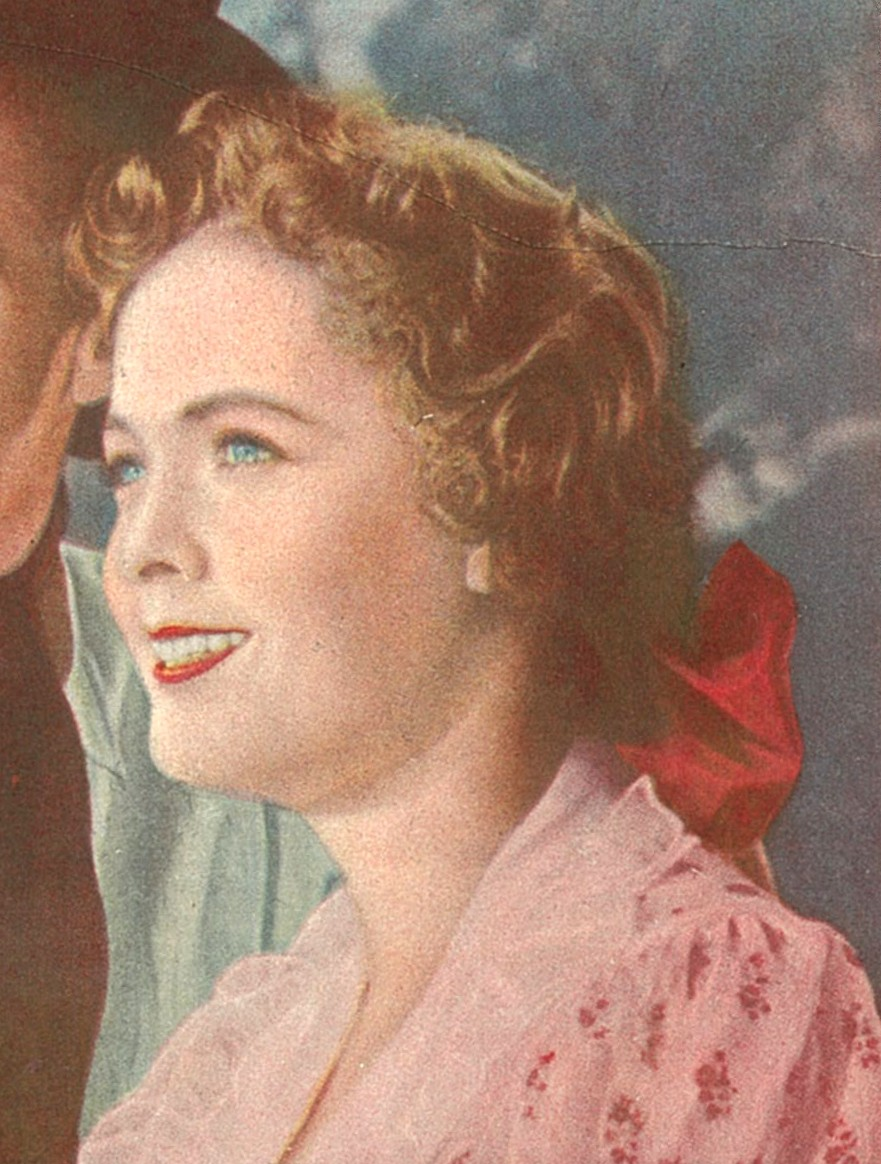
- Davenport in a Japanese advertisement from the 1940 film The Westerner
- Born: January 17, 1917; Moline, Illinois, U.S.
- Died: June 18, 1980 (aged 63); Santa Cruz, California, U.S.
- Other name: Doris Jordan (model)
- Occupation: Actress
- Years active: 1934–1940
- Notable work: The Westerner
- Spouse: Garland Weaver (m. 1938; div. 1941)

Doris Davenport, also known as Doris Jordan (January 1, 1917 – June 18, 1980) was an American actress in movies of the 1930s and early 1940s.

== Early years ==
Davenport was born in Moline, Illinois, and lived in Davenport, Iowa, before she and her mother moved to Los Angeles, California. She wanted to be an actress when she was five years old, and her parents supported that desire by providing voice training and classes in drama.

== Career ==
Davenport's first film was Kid Millions (1934). After that, however, she said, "It looked as if my career had begun and ended all at once." A stock contract with Metro-Goldwyn-Mayer disappointed her after she realized "it wasn't any better than extra work". Over a span of approximately four years she applied her acting abilities on radio and in little theater.

From 1934 to 1939, she appeared in five films and worked in New York City as a model between films. When she was interviewed under the screen name Doris Jordan for the role of Scarlett O'Hara for Gone with the Wind, she received a short-term contract with Warner Bros. She did well enough to become one of the finalists for the role.

Despite not winning that major role, Davenport impressed studio head Samuel Goldwyn. In 1940, he gave a lead role to Davenport in the film The Westerner, starring opposite Gary Cooper and Walter Brennan. The same year, she starred in the movie Behind the News opposite Lloyd Nolan. It was her last role. Shortly after she completed The Westerner she was in a car accident in which her legs were crushed, which required her to walk with a cane the rest of her life, and she retired from acting.

== Personal life and death ==
When she worked as a model, Davenport met photographer V. G. Weaver, Jr. They were married on April 12, 1938, in Fordston, Arizona, and they were divorced on July 18, 1941.

Davenport lived in Santa Cruz, California, for 10 years prior to her death on June 18, 1980, age 63.

== Filmography ==
Year	Title	Role	Notes
1934	Kid Millions	Nora aka Toots	
1935	George White's 1935 Scandals	Chorine	uncredited
1935	The Girl Friend	Chorus Girl in Play	uncredited
1936	Born to Dance	Chorus Girl	uncredited
1937	Thin Ice	Member of Girls Band	uncredited
1939	Sorority House	Neva Simpson	
1940	The Westerner	Jane Ellen Mathews	
1940	Behind the News	Barbara Shaw	
