= The Westerner (1940 film) =

1940 film by William Wyler

- Cinema poster
- Directed by: William Wyler
- Screenplay by: Niven Busch; Jo Swerling; W.R. Burnett (uncredited); Lillian Hellman (uncredited); Oliver La Farge (uncredited); Dudley Nichols (uncredited)
- Story by: Stuart N. Lake
- Produced by: Samuel Goldwyn
- Starring: Gary Cooper; Walter Brennan; Fred Stone; Doris Davenport
- Cinematography: Gregg Toland; Rudolph Maté (additional footage) (uncredited)
- Edited by: Daniel Mandell
- Music by: Alfred Newman; Dimitri Tiomkin
- Production company: Samuel Goldwyn Productions
- Distributed by: United Artists
- Release date: September 20, 1940
- Running time: 100 minutes
- Country: United States
- Language: English
- Budget: $1 million

The Westerner is a 1940 American Western film directed by William Wyler and starring Gary Cooper, Walter Brennan and Doris Davenport. Written by Niven Busch and Jo Swerling (from a story by Stuart N. Lake), the film concerns a self-appointed hanging judge in Vinegaroon, Texas, who befriends a saddle tramp who opposes the judge's policy against homesteaders. The film is remembered for Walter Brennan's performance as Judge Roy Bean, for which he won his record-setting third Academy Award for Best Supporting Actor. James Basevi and Stuart N. Lake also received Academy Award nominations for Best Art Direction, Black and White and Best Story, respectively. The supporting cast features Dana Andrews, Chill Wills and Forrest Tucker.

== Plot ==
In 1882, the town of Vinegaroon, Texas, is run by Judge Roy Bean, who calls himself "the only law west of the Pecos." Conducting trials from his saloon, Bean makes a corrupt living meting out his own eccentric form of justice. Those who annoy him are usually hanged. That includes an unfortunate homesteader who put up barbed-wire fencing, which causes a shootout with Bean's cattlemen cronies.

Cole Harden is a drifter accused of stealing a horse belonging to Chickenfoot, Bean's main sidekick. Harden's conviction by a jury composed of Bean's men seems certain, and the undertaker waits eagerly for the verdict and hanging. Bean dismisses Harden's contention that he bought the horse legally from another man. Noticing the judge's obsession with the English actress Lily Langtry, in desperation Harden claims to know her intimately and to have a lock of her hair, which he claims is in El Paso. Bean sentences him to hang, but suspends the sentence. Just then, the man who sold Harden the horse enters the bar. The two men brawl, and Harden knocks the real thief to the ground. Bean kills the man when the latter tries to shoot Harden in the back.

Bean likes Harden, considering him a kindred spirit because Harden is as bold and daring as Bean was in his youth. However, Bean tries to shoot him when Harden lends his support to the homesteaders, a group led by Jane-Ellen Mathews and her father Caliphet. The struggling homesteaders have been at odds with Bean and his cattle-rancher allies for a long time. Harden tries to appeal to the judge's better nature, and he even saves Bean from an attempted lynching. When that fails, and a corn crop is burned and Mr. Mathews killed, Harden sees no choice but to take action. He is deputized by the county sheriff and procures an arrest warrant for Bean.

Arresting Bean in Vinegaroon, now renamed Langtry by the judge in honor of the actress, is impossible with all of Bean's men around. When Bean learns that Langtry will be appearing in a nearby town, a long day's ride from Vinegaroon, he has one of his men buy all of the tickets. Bean dons his full Confederate Civil War regalia and rides to see the performance with his men. He enters the theater alone to await the performance, leaving his henchmen outside.

Unknown to Bean, Harden has been waiting in the theater to arrest him. In the ensuing gunfight, Harden fatally wounds Bean. Harden carries Bean backstage to meet the woman he has adored for so long. After Bean introduces himself, he dies.

Two years later, Harden and Jane-Ellen, now married and having rebuilt the burned farm, watch as new settlers arrive.

== Cast ==
- Gary Cooper as Cole Harden
- Walter Brennan as Judge Roy Bean
- Doris Davenport as Jane Ellen Mathews
- Fred Stone as Caliphet Mathews
- Forrest Tucker as Wade Harper
- Paul Hurst as Chickenfoot
- Chill Wills as Southeast
- Lilian Bond as Lillie Langtry
- Dana Andrews as Hod Johnson
- Charles Halton as Mort Borrow
- Trevor Bardette as Shad Wilkins
- Tom Tyler as King Evans
- Lucien Littlefield as The Stranger
- Hank Bell as Deputy (uncredited)
- Charles Coleman as Lily Langtry's Manager (uncredited)
- Heinie Conklin as Man at Ticket Window (uncredited)

== Production ==
According to Niven Busch, Sam Goldwyn bought a ten-page treatment about Judge Roy Bean and hired Jo Swerling to turn it into a script. Busch says that Swerling struggled to plot the script and Busch had just been nominated for In Old Chicago so he was hired to work with Sweling. Busch:

Swerling and I had a very productive collaboration. He really didn’t like me, but we worked together great. Walter Brennan came along with some good ideas; if I was stuck I ran down to Cooper’s dressing room, and he would put me right. Cooper was such a fund of information about the West.

When Gary Cooper learned that Walter Brennan would be playing the part of Judge Roy Bean, he tried to withdraw from the film, believing that his character would be reduced to a minor role. Although Goldwyn assured Cooper that his role would be expanded, Cooper remained unconvinced, writing to Samuel Goldwyn: "I couldn't see that it needed Gary Cooper for the part." Goldwyn remained adamant about Cooper's contractual obligations and insisted that he star in the film. In a formal letter to Goldwyn indicating his intention to sever their future working relationship, Cooper agreed to fulfill his contract and to "perform my services...to the fullest of my ability, with the express understanding that I am doing so under protest."

Cooper and Brennan appeared in eight films together: Watch Your Wife (1926), The Wedding Night (1935), The Cowboy and the Lady (1938), The Westerner (1940), Meet John Doe (1941), Sergeant York (1941), Pride of the Yankees (1942) and Task Force (1949).

== Reception ==
The New York Times critic Bosley Crowther found the film fatally flawed, writing:

Gary Cooper is an exceedingly modest fellow—too modest for his own good, perhaps. For in Samuel Goldwyn's "The Westerner," which arrived yesterday at the Music Hall, he casually permits the most important role in the picture to be taken away from him and bestowed upon capable Walter Brennan. ... If some one could just have decided who should carry the ball, instead of letting it pass from one to the other, "The Westerner" might have been a bang-up, dandy film. And that, we are sorry to say, it isn't. The trouble, as indicated, is that the picture has no core. ... Such confusion in its fundamental purpose prevents "The Westerner" from ever hitting a stride. And that is indeed too bad, for there are things about it which are excellent. Mr. Brennan is one of them.

Brennan received his third Academy Award for Best Supporting Actor (within the five years since the category's inception), which prompted the academy to rescind the extras' union from voting.

The Westerner was nominated by the American Film Institute for inclusion in the Western category of its 2008 list AFI's 10 Top 10.
