= Mile Canyon =

- U.S. National Register of Historic Places
- U.S. Historic district
- U.S. National Historic Landmark District – Contributing property
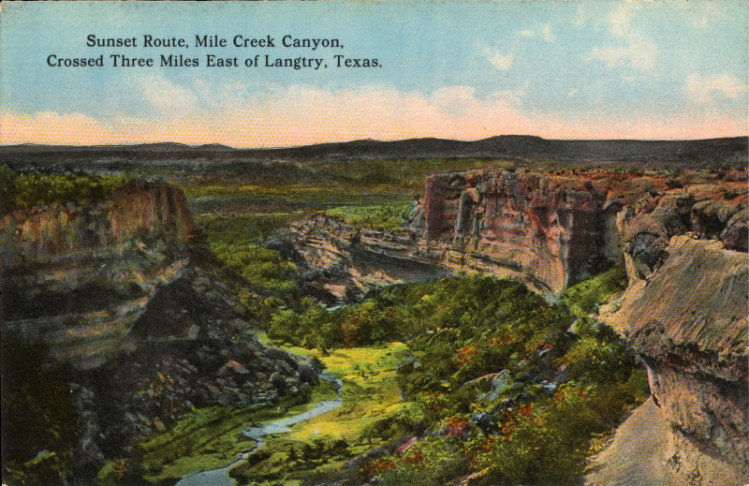
- Postcard depiction, 1908
- Location: Just downstream from Langtry
- Nearest city: Langtry, Texas
- Coordinates: 29°48′35″N 101°33′01″W
- Area: 1,500 acres (610 ha)
- Part of: Lower Pecos Canyonlands Archeological District (ID100006256)
- NRHP reference No.: 70000773

Significant dates
- Added to NRHP: October 15, 1970
- Designated NHLDCP: January 13, 2021

Mile Canyon or more recently known as Eagle Nest Canyon is a tributary canyon of the Rio Grande entering on the north side of the river just downstream from Langtry, Texas. Mile Canyon received its name due to its length being approximately one mile long. In more recent years, this canyon is more commonly referred to as Eagle Nest Canyon, named after a nesting pair of golden eagles observed nearby. It has been an important area of many archaeological and geological expeditions over the past century.

== Environmental setting ==
Mile Canyon is found on the northern boundary of the Chihuahuan Desert.

== Archaeology ==
This canyon and its surrounding upland edge contains numerous sites ranging from dry rockshelters to burned rock middens to upland “hearth” fields.

The canyon is primarily recognized for Bonfire Shelter, Kelly Cave, Eagle Cave, and other natural shelters that were used by Native Americans up to 13,500 years ago. Bonfire Shelter features a prehistoric bison jump, where wild herds of bison were driven off the cliff edge by Native American hunters and died below. The bison were then harvested for clothing, food and tools. The jumps occurred as early as 9700 BC and as recently as 800 BC.

The canyon was added to the National Register of Historic Places in 1970 AD. The historic district comprises a 1,500 acre (6 km^{2}) area entirely on private land.

In 2014, archaeological research was conducted on the many sites found within and around the canyon by a crew from Texas State University. This research was part of a multiyear research design focused on the Lower Pecos Canyonlands called the Ancient Southwest Texas Project.

== History ==
The Mile Canyon was the area where Lt. John L. Bullis and his Black Seminole scouts fought border Indians on 25 April 1875.

In 1882, a railway camp named Eagle's Nest was established around the canyon.

== See also ==
- National Register of Historic Places listings in Val Verde County, Texas
