= Joan Didion bibliography =

This is a list of works by and on American author Joan Didion.

== Fiction ==
- Run, River (1963) ISBN 0679752501
- Play It as It Lays (1970) ISBN 0374529949
- A Book of Common Prayer (1977) ISBN 0671224913
- Democracy (1984) ISBN 0679754857
- The Last Thing He Wanted (1996) ISBN 0679433317

== Nonfiction ==
- Slouching Towards Bethlehem (1968) ISBN 0374266360
- The White Album (1979) ISBN 0374532079
- Salvador (1983) ISBN 0671470248
- Miami (1987) ISBN 0671646648
- After Henry (1992) ISBN 0671727311
- Political Fictions (2001) ISBN 0375413383
- Where I Was From (2003) ISBN 0679433325
- Fixed Ideas: America Since 9.11 (2003; essay first published in the January 16, 2003 issue of The New York Review of Books under the title "Fixed Opinions, or The Hinge of History") ISBN 1590170733
- The Year of Magical Thinking (2005) ISBN 1400078431
- Blue Nights (2011) ISBN 978-0307267672
- South and West: From a Notebook (2017) ISBN 978-1524732790
- Let Me Tell You What I Mean (2021) ISBN 978-0593312193
- Notes to John (2025) ISBN 978-0593803677

== Anthologies ==
- Vintage Didion (2004; includes excerpts from previous nonfiction works) ISBN 1400033934
- Live and Learn (2005; includes Slouching Towards Bethlehem, The White Album and After Henry) ISBN 0007204388
- We Tell Ourselves Stories in Order to Live: Collected Nonfiction (2006; includes Didion's first seven volumes of nonfiction) ISBN 0307264874
- I Write to Find Out What I Am Thinking: Collected Nonfiction (2025; includes the last four books published in Didion's lifetime) ISBN 978-0593992210

=== Library of America collection ===
- Joan Didion: The 1960s & 70s (2019; edited by David L. Ulin) ISBN 978-1598536454
- Joan Didion: The 1980s & 90s (2021; edited by David L. Ulin) ISBN 978-1598536836
- Joan Didion: Memoirs & Later Writings (2024; edited by David L. Ulin) ISBN 978-1598537871

== Uncollected essays and articles ==
Below are essays and articles by Didion that have not been published in book form to date.

- "Berkeley's Giant: The University of California". Mademoiselle. January 1960.
- "Et tu, Mrs. Miniver" (PDF). National Review. January 2, 1960.
- "Marriage a la Mode" (PDF). National Review. August 13, 1960.
- "San Francisco Job Hunt". Mademoiselle: 128–29. September 1960.
- "Washington, D.C.: Anything Can Happen Here". Mademoiselle. November 1960.
- "Jealousy: Is It a Curable Illness?". Vogue. June 1961.
- "Take No for an Answer". Vogue. October 1, 1961.
- "When it was Magic Time in Jersey". Vogue. September 15, 1962.
- "Emotional Blackmail: An Affair of Every Heart". Vogue. November 15, 1962.
- "American Summer". Vogue. May 1963.
- "I'll Take Romance" (PDF). National Review. September 24, 1963.
- "Silver to Have and to Hurl". Vogue. April 1, 1964.
- "Bosses Make Lousy Lovers". The Saturday Evening Post. January 31, 1965.
- "New Museum in Mexico". Vogue. August 1, 1965.
- "Questions About the New Fiction" (PDF). National Review. November 30, 1965.
- "The Big Rock Candy Figgy Pudding Pitfall". The Saturday Evening Post. 3 December 1966.
- "On Becoming a Cop Hater". The Saturday Evening Post. August 24, 1968.
- "On the Last Frontier with VX and GB". Life. February 20, 1970.
- "Where Tonight Show Guests Go to Rest". Esquire. October 1976.
- "Falconer". The New York Times. March 6, 1977. (Review of Falconer by John Cheever)
- "Getting the Vegas Willies". Esquire. May 1977.
- "Meditation on a Life". The New York Times. April 29, 1979. (Review of Sleepless Nights by Elizabeth Hardwick)
- "Letter from 'Manhattan'". The New York Review of Books. August 16, 1979. ISSN 0028-7504.
- "'I want to go ahead and do it'". The New York Times. October 7, 1979. (Review of The Executioner's Song by Norman Mailer)
- "Without Regret or Hope". The New York Review of Books. June 12, 1980. ISSN 0028-7504.
- "Discovery". The New York Review of Books. October 1, 1984. ISSN 0028-7504.
- "When Trees Grew on Money". The New York Times. December 1, 1991. (Review of The Golden Age of American Gardens by Mac Griswold and Eleanor Weller)
- "Varieties of Madness". The New York Review of Books. April 23, 1998. ISSN 0028-7504.
- "'The Day Was Hot and Still...'". The New York Review of Books. November 4, 1999. ISSN 0028-7504.
- "Mr. Bush & the Divine". The New York Review of Books. November 6, 2003. ISSN 0028-7504.
- "Politics in the 'New Normal' America". The New York Review of Books. October 21, 2004. ISSN 0028-7504.
- "The Case of Theresa Schiavo". The New York Review of Books. June 9, 2005. ISSN 0028-7504.
- "Cheney: The Fatal Touch". The New York Review of Books. October 5, 2006. ISSN 0028-7504.
- "On Elizabeth Hardwick (1916–2007)". The New York Review of Books. February 14, 2008. ISSN 0028-7504. (With Darryl Pinckney; adapted from remarks delivered at a memorial service for Elizabeth Hardwick on December 16, 2007)
- "Joan Didion on 'Election by sound bite'". Salon. 17 October 2008. Archived from the original on October 23, 2012.
- "Obama: In the Irony-Free Zone". The New York Review of Books. December 18, 2008. ISSN 0028-7504. (With Darryl Pinckney; adapted from comments made at a symposium at the New York Public Library on November 10, 2008)
- "In Sable and Dark Glasses". Vogue. October 31, 2011.

== Screenplays and plays ==
- The Panic in Needle Park (1971) (with husband John Gregory Dunne and based on the novel by James Mills)
- Play It as It Lays (1972) (with John Gregory Dunne and based on her novel)
- A Star Is Born (1976) (with John Gregory Dunne and Frank Pierson)
- True Confessions (1981) (with John Gregory Dunne and based on his novel of the same name)
- Women & Men: Stories of Seduction (1990) (segment: Hills Like White Elephants; with John Gregory Dunne)
- Up Close & Personal (1996) (with John Gregory Dunne)
- The Year of Magical Thinking (2007) (a stage play based on her book) ISBN 978-0307386410
- As It Happens (2012) (with Todd Field; unrealized project)

== Biographies of and memoirs about Didion ==
Below are biographies of and memoirs about Didion.

- Anolik, Lili (2024). Didion and Babitz. New York: Scribner. ISBN 978-1668065488.
- Daugherty, Tracy (2015). The Last Love Song: A Biography of Joan Didion. New York: St. Martin's Publishing Group. ISBN 978-1250105943.
- Davidson, Sara (2023). The Didion Files: Fifty Years of Friendship with Joan Didion. Independently published. ISBN 979-8856871998.
- Dunne, Griffin (2024). The Friday Afternoon Club: A Family Memoir. New York: Penguin Press. ISBN 978-0593652824.
- Leadbeater, Cory (2024). The Uptown Local: Joy, Death, and Joan Didion: A Memoir. New York: Ecco. ISBN 978-0063371576.

== Conversations and interviews ==
- Friedman, Ellen G., ed. (1984). Joan Didion: Essays and Conversations. Princeton: Ontario Review Press. ISBN 086538035X.
- Melville House, ed. (2022). Joan Didion: The Last Interview and Other Conversations. New York: Melville House. ISBN 978-1685890117.
- Parker, Scott F., ed. (2018). Conversations with Joan Didion. Jackson: University Press of Mississippi. ISBN 978-1496815514.

== Books on Didion's work ==
- Als, Hilton (2022). Joan Didion: What She Means. New York: DelMonico Books. ISBN 978-1636810577. (Companion book to the Hammer Museum exhibition of the same name)
- Berman, Jeffrey (2010). Companionship in Grief: Love and Loss in the Memoirs of C.S. Lewis, John Bayley, Donald Hall, Joan Didion, and Calvin Trillin. Amherst: University of Massachusetts Press. ISBN 978-1558498044.
- Dean, Michelle (2018). Sharp: The Women Who Made an Art of Having an Opinion. New York: Grove Press. ISBN 978-0802125095.
- Felton, Sharon, ed. (1994). The Critical Response to Joan Didion. Westport, Connecticut: Greenwood Publishing Group. ISBN 0313285349.
- Henderson, Katherine Usher (1981). Joan Didion. New York: Frederick Ungar. ISBN 0804423709.
- Houston, Lynn Marie; Lombardi, William V. (2009). Reading Joan Didion. Santa Barbara, California: Greenwood Press. ISBN 978-0313364037.
- Loris, Michelle C. (1989). Innocence, Loss and Recovery in the Art of Joan Didion. New York: Peter Lang. ISBN 0820406619.
- McDonnell, Evelyn (2023). The World According to Joan Didion. New York: HarperOne. ISBN 978-0063289079.
- McLennan, Matthew R. (2019). Philosophy and Vulnerability: Catherine Breillat, Joan Didion, and Audre Lorde. London: Bloomsbury Academic. ISBN 978-1350004153.
- —————————— (2022). Joan Didion and the Ethics of Memory. London: Bloomsbury Academic. ISBN 978-1350149595.
- McClure, John A. (1994). Late Imperial Romance. London; New York: Verso Books. ISBN 086091612X.
- Nelson, Deborah (2017). Tough Enough: Arbus, Arendt, Didion, McCarthy, Sontag, Weil. Chicago: University of Chicago Press. ISBN 978-0226457802.
- Nelson, Steffie, ed. (2020). Slouching Towards Los Angeles: Living and Writing by Joan Didion's Light. Los Angeles: Rare Bird Books. ISBN 978-1644281673.
- Nowak-McNeice, Katarzyna (2018). California and the Melancholic American Identity in Joan Didion's Novels: Exiled from Eden. New York: Routledge. ISBN 978-0429655319.
- Parrish, Timothy (2008). From the Civil War to the Apocalypse: Postmodern History and American Fiction. Amherst: University of Massachusetts Press. ISBN 978-1558496279.
- Rhodes, Chip (2008). Politics, Desire, and the Hollywood Novel. Iowa City: University of Iowa Press. ISBN 978-1587297557.
- Scarpino, Cinzia; Zehelein, Eva-Sabine, eds. (2023). Joan Didion: Life and/with/through Words. Berlin: Peter Lang. ISBN 978-3631894408.
- Stout, Janis P. (1990). Strategies of Reticence: Silence and Meaning in the Works of Jane Austen, Willa Cather, Katherine Anne Porter, and Joan Didion. Charlottesville: University Press of Virginia. ISBN 0813912628.
- —————— (1998). Through the Window, Out the Door: Women's Narratives of Departure, from Austin and Cather to Tyler, Morrison, and Didion. Tuscaloosa: University of Alabama Press. ISBN 081730908X.
- Szalay, Michael (2012). Hip Figures: A Literary History of the Democratic Party. Redwood City, California: Stanford University Press. ISBN 978-0804776356.
- Vandenberg, Kathleen M. (2021). Joan Didion: Substance and Style. Albany: State University of New York Press. ISBN 978-1438481388.
- Weingarten, Marc (2010). The Gang That Wouldn't Write Straight: Wolfe, Thompson, Didion, Capote, and the New Journalism Revolution. New York: Crown Publishing Group. ISBN 978-0307525697.
- Wilkinson, Alissa (2025). We Tell Ourselves Stories: Joan Didion and the American Dream Machine. New York: Liveright. ISBN 978-1324092612.
- Worden, Daniel (2020). Neoliberal Nonfictions: The Documentary Aesthetic from Joan Didion to Jay-Z. Charlottesville: University of Virginia Press. ISBN 978-0813944159.
