= Let Me Tell You What I Mean =

2021 essay collection by Joan Didion

- Author: Joan Didion
- Cover artist: Caroline Devine Carson
- Language: English
- Genre: Essay
- Publisher: Alfred A. Knopf (US), Fourth Estate (UK)
- Publication date: January 26, 2021
- Publication place: United States
- Media type: Print (hardcover and paperback)
- Pages: 192
- ISBN: 978-0593318485

Let Me Tell You What I Mean is a collection of essays by Joan Didion published on January 26, 2021. It was her last published book before her death on December 23, 2021. The book includes 12 essays, written between 1968 and 2000, and a foreword by critic Hilton Als. Like many of Didion's previous essay collections, the pieces in the book represent a mixture of reporting, memoir and criticism.

Let Me Tell You What I Mean was a critical success. It also reached number six on The New York Times Best Seller list.

== Contents ==
- "Alicia and the Underground Press"
  About Didion's fondness for underground newspapers. First appeared in 1968 in The Saturday Evening Post.
- "Getting Serenity"
  About a Gamblers Anonymous meeting Didion attended in Gardena, California. First appeared in 1968 in The Saturday Evening Post.
- "A Trip to Xanadu"
  About the Hearst Castle and its symbolic importance in California culture. First appeared in 1968 in The Saturday Evening Post.
- "On Being Unchosen by the College of One's Choice"
  About Didion's failure to be admitted to Stanford University. First appeared in 1968 in The Saturday Evening Post.
- "Pretty Nancy"
  A profile of then-First Lady of California Nancy Reagan. First appeared in 1968 in The Saturday Evening Post. A shortened version of the article later appeared in the essay "Good Citizens", included in The White Album (1979).
- "Fathers, Sons, Screaming Eagles"
  About a reunion of 101st Airborne Division veterans that Didion attended in Las Vegas at the height of American involvement in the Vietnam War. First appeared in 1968 in The Saturday Evening Post.
- "Why I Write"
  About Didion's relationship with writing. First appeared in 1976 in The New York Times Magazine. It was later included in the anthology The Writer on Her Work, edited by Janet Sternburg (1980).
- "Telling Stories"
  About Didion's brief experience writing short stories. First appeared in 1978 in New West.
- "Some Women"
  First appeared in 1989 as an introduction to Robert Mapplethorpe's book Some Women.
- "The Long Distance Runner"
  First appeared in 1993 as an introduction to Tony Richardson's autobiography The Long Distance Runner.
- "Last Words"
  About the controversial posthumous publication of Ernest Hemingway's unfinished work. First appeared in 1998 in The New Yorker.
- "Everywoman.com"
  A profile of businesswoman Martha Stewart. First appeared in 2000 in The New Yorker.

== Release ==
The release of Let Me Tell You What I Mean was highly anticipated, coming amid a resurgence of interest in Didion's work following the publication of her two best-selling memoirs, The Year of Magical Thinking (2005) and Blue Nights (2011), and the release of the Netflix documentary Joan Didion: The Center Will Not Hold (2017). In its first week of publication, it reached no. 6 on The New York Times Best Seller list.

== Reception ==
Let Me Tell You What I Mean was met with widespread critical acclaim, with reviewers praising the quality and perceptiveness of Didion's writing, as well as the diversity of the topics covered. Writing for The New York Times Book Review, Durga Chew-Bose said, "Didion's pen is like a periscope onto the creative mind – and, as this collection demonstrates, it always has been." Kirkus Reviews called it "both a practical entry point for neophytes and a celebration for longtime fans". The Washington Post praised "the clarity of Didion's vision and the precision with which she sets it down", although it noted the absence of material written after 2000. Reviewing the book for Los Angeles magazine, Bret Easton Ellis, a long-time admirer of Didion's work, wrote, "reading [Let Me Tell You What I Mean], you're once again reminded that the observations and subjects might not be unique, but that the angles from which Didion looked at everything are totally different from anyone else's".

Let Me Tell You What I Mean received similar praise in the United Kingdom. In a review for The Guardian, Francesca Wade called it "a valuable addition to the literature of self-doubt and self-awareness". In The Observer, Peter Conrad wrote, "A sentence by Didion, whether it sticks to 39 characters or articulates possibilities in multiple dependent clauses, is always a marvel of magical thinking".
