= Joan Didion: The Center Will Not Hold =

2017 documentary film

- Promotional poster
- Directed by: Griffin Dunne
- Produced by: Griffin Dunne; Annabella Dunne; Mary Recine; Susanne Rostock
- Cinematography: Tom Hurwitz; Reed Morano; William Rexer
- Edited by: Ann Collins
- Music by: Nathan Halpern
- Distributed by: Netflix
- Release dates: October 11, 2017 (New York Film Festival); October 27, 2017
- Running time: 94 minutes
- Country: United States
- Language: English

Joan Didion: The Center Will Not Hold is a 2017 documentary film about Joan Didion and her work. The film was released by Netflix on October 10, 2017.

== Premise ==
In the film, director Griffin Dunne, Joan Didion's nephew, incorporates archival footage and conversations with Didion about the eras she covered in essays, novels and screenplays, as well as events in her personal life.

== Synopsis ==
Didion narrates that she went to San Francisco in search of work, convinced that writing was not important work. She began writing at age five, when her mother gave her a journal to start writing instead of whining about her thoughts. She was born in California and spent many years living in Sacramento. Didion won a writing contest by Vogue and began working there. Her first piece was about self-respect. Its personal nature was unusual for the magazine at the time. Her first novel was Run, River, which only sold 11 copies. Didion recalls her father being severely depressed throughout her childhood, although she did not recognize it at the time.

Didion married John Gregory Dunne, another writer. They lived in New York until Didion was 28, when she realized she was no longer happy there. Then they moved to California for six months. They bought a house in Portuguese Bend, where they stayed for one year while Dunne researched for a book he was writing on the California grape strike. One day, Dunne received a phone call that there was a baby girl at the hospital who needed a home. Didion and Dunne took her home. They named the baby Quintana and performed a baptism for her at the kitchen sink. They moved out of the beach house after adopting Quintana. Didion liked to write pieces on rock and roll subjects. During this time, she began writing on hippiedom, a growing trend at the time. Many of her pieces were published in New York, where readers could catch a glimpse of the West Coast hippie lifestyle unfamiliar to them. In August 1969, word of the murders on Cielo Drive shook the community. Didion interviewed Linda Kasabian as she testified about the murders.

In the mid-1960s, Didion and Dunne began to have marital problems and wrote about being on the brink of divorce. Didion wrote the novel Play It as It Lays, whose protagonist Maria is loosely based on Didion. They moved back to the beach, this time in Malibu, overlooking the ocean, and living near the beach was helpful for Didion. She wrote A Book of Common Prayer in anticipation of Quintana growing up and leaving her. She used novels to deal with her own fears.

Didion then began transitioning to writing about politics, supported by Bob Silvers, editor-in-chief of the New York Review of Books at the time. Didion wanted to investigate the brutality in El Salvador. She also wrote about the Central Park jogger case and the Bush-Cheney administration.

Dunne's work brought him and Didion back to New York City. Once, Quintana told Didion that she had been remote as a mother, which made Didion realize how little parents understand their children. In July 2003, Quintana got married. That December, Quintana was too sick to attend Christmas Eve dinner. She became very sick and was admitted to the ICU. One day, as Didion was preparing supper, Dunne slumped in his chair at home and died. Didion sent Quintana for a short trip to Malibu, where she fell and suffered brain injuries at the airport. She went into a coma and struggled to recover for two years, until she died in August 2005.

Didion described the grief of losing her husband and daughter as dislocating to both her mind and body. She wrote about her feelings of emptiness and void in losing Dunne in her book The Year of Magical Thinking. Didion was scared to move on and let go, out of fear that her memories with Dunne and Quintana would become increasingly remote as time passed.

Didion's nephew, Griffin Dunne, wanted to write a play about her life. She weighed about 75 pounds at this time, and he helped her become healthy again in preparing for the play.

Didion wrote Blue Nights about Quintana, as a way to confront her death. Didion realized she had focused on Quintana's amusing side while not fully seeing her troubled side. She felt guilty about not properly taking care of Quintana after her adoption.

During the Obama presidency, Didion was awarded a National Medal of Arts for exploring the depths of sorrow.

== Appearances ==
- Hilton Als
- Tom Brokaw
- Dick Cheney
- Joan Didion
- Griffin Dunne
- John Gregory Dunne
- Tony Dunne
- Harrison Ford
- David Hare
- Patty Hearst
- Linda Kasabian
- Ed Koch
- Vanessa Redgrave
- Robert B. Silvers
- Calvin Trillin
- Anna Wintour

== Release ==
It was released on October 27, 2017, on Netflix streaming.

== Reception ==
On Rotten Tomatoes, the film has a rating of 89% based on reviews from 35 critics. The site's consensus states: "Joan Didion: The Center Will Not Hold pays tribute to an American literary legend with a richly personal perspective that should thrill devotees while enlightening newcomers." On Metacritic, it has a score of 72% based on reviews from 9 critics, indicating "generally favorable reviews".
