= We Tell Ourselves Stories in Order to Live =

2006 nonfiction anthology by Joan Didion

- First edition
- Author: Joan Didion
- Cover artist: Julian Wasser
- Language: English
- Series: Everyman's Library
- Genre: Essays
- Publisher: Knopf
- Publication date: 2006
- Publication place: United States
- Media type: Print (Hardback)
- Pages: 1122 pp
- ISBN: 0-307-26487-4
- OCLC: 64594439

We Tell Ourselves Stories in Order to Live: Collected Nonfiction is a 2006 collection of nonfiction by Joan Didion. It was released in the Everyman's Library, a series of reprinted classic literature, as one of the titles chosen to mark the series' 100th anniversary. The title is taken from the opening line of Didion's essay "The White Album" in the book of the same name. We Tell Ourselves Stories in Order to Live includes the full content of her first seven volumes of nonfiction. The contents range in style, including journalism, memoir, and cultural and political commentary.

Critics noted that Didion's distinct literary voice, highlighted by John Leonard's introduction, is apparent throughout the collection. The Chicago Tribune review stated "even the slightest [of her work] tends to have at least a moment when her prose somehow modulates ... transfigures ... kicks the whole thing up a level."

== Contents ==
- Introduction by John Leonard
- Slouching Towards Bethlehem (1968)
- The White Album (1979)
- Salvador (1983)
- Miami (1987)
- After Henry (1992)
- Political Fictions (2001)
- Where I Was From (2003)
