= The Last Thing He Wanted (film) =

2020 film

- Release poster
- Directed by: Dee Rees
- Screenplay by: Marco Villalobos; Dee Rees
- Based on: The Last Thing He Wanted by Joan Didion
- Produced by: Cassian Elwes; Dee Rees
- Starring: Anne Hathaway; Ben Affleck; Rosie Perez; Edi Gathegi; Mel Rodriguez; Toby Jones; Willem Dafoe
- Cinematography: Bobby Bukowski
- Edited by: Mako Kamitsuna
- Music by: Tamar-kali
- Production companies: Elevated Films; Little Red Hen; The Fyzz Facility
- Distributed by: Netflix
- Release dates: January 27, 2020 (Sundance); February 14, 2020 (United States)
- Running time: 115 minutes
- Countries: United States; United Kingdom
- Language: English
- Budget: $100 million

The Last Thing He Wanted is a 2020 political thriller film directed by Dee Rees, based on the 1996 novel of the same name by Joan Didion, from a screenplay by Rees and Marco Villalobos. The film stars Anne Hathaway, Ben Affleck, Rosie Perez, Edi Gathegi, Mel Rodriguez, Toby Jones, and Willem Dafoe.

The Last Thing He Wanted had its world premiere at the Sundance Film Festival on January 27, 2020, and was released in select theaters on February 14, 2020, followed by a release on February 21 on Netflix. The film was panned by critics, who criticized the writing.

== Plot ==
Elena McMahon is a journalist reporting out of the Atlantic Post's Central American bureau in El Salvador who is forced to flee during the civil war. A few years later she is pushing to reopen the bureau, but her editor reveals that Congress is secretly pressuring the paper to dial back their coverage of Central and South American affairs, so reopening the bureau is not an option. Instead, he reassigns Elena to cover Ronald Reagan's re-election campaign.

Elena reluctantly agrees to meet with her absentee father, Dick. She realises he is still involved in trafficking illegal contraband, but also that he is suffering from dementia.

Elena embarks on Reagan's campaign trail. In Cincinnati, she uses her acquaintance with Helena Shultz to get a seat at her husband, Secretary of State George Shultz's table during Helena's birthday party. Elena attempts to question him but he stonewalls her until a staffer intervenes.

In Houston, Elena meets with General Gus Sharp who had previously identified American shell casings in El Salvador as coming from a stockpile in Missouri. She shows him surveillance photos of shipping containers, which Sharp identifies as surplus arms from various National Guard units, including the 20th Special Forces.

Elena receives a call that Dick has been hospitalized. She hands off her assignment to her friend Alma and goes to Florida to take care of him. He begs her to meet his business associate, Barry Sedlow, for an important deal that he has set up. Elena reluctantly agrees to meet Sedlow, allowing her to investigate the story from the inside.

Sedlow gives Elena specific instructions for how to deliver a large arms shipment to Costa Rica. She is to be paid in traveler's checks, but upon arriving the buyer, Jones, shorts her, also paying in cocaine. When the cargo pilot she flew in with leaves without her, Jones drives her to San José. She seizes the opportunity to take his gun and vehicle, driving herself the rest of the way.

When leaving Costa Rica, Elena discovers the passport she was given has the name Elise Meyer. She manages to depart, narrowly avoiding trouble when her cab driver is stopped by security with her bag containing the cocaine and gun; it has her father's name on it, so the cab driver is arrested.

Secretary Shultz meets with Ambassador-at-Large Treat Morrison, who has been looking into Elena's background since her original encounter with Shultz.

Elena ends up in Antigua, where she learns that her father has died. She attempts to enter the American embassy to get a valid passport, but it is the 4th of July, and nobody is available. Dejected, she returns to her hotel, where Morrison arrives and hides his true agenda. After some mild verbal sparring, Elena sleeps with him. Confessing who her father is, she explains what she has been doing for him in Central America. Elena believes that her focus on this story was motivated by her fear of losing her connection to her daughter Cat. The teen is enrolled in a boarding school, and fears her work will be all she has left.

The next day, Elena is by the hotel pool when Jones arrives and rescues her from an attack by gunmen. He escorts her to safety and explains to her that the deal her father was offered was fake, meant to lure Dick out of hiding. Morrison puts her in touch with Paul Schuster, who gives her a place to stay while things get sorted out. After several days at Paul's, Morrison reaches out and lays out a plan to get her home, where she can break the story on the arms deals. The next day, a shooter arrives at Paul's, killing him and his staff before calling out to Elena. She turns around to see Morrison, who fatally shoots her.

Morrison gives official testimony claiming he shot Elena in self-defense. Meanwhile, Jones issues an official report to his superiors in French Intelligence revealing he had been trying to protect her. Finally, Alma uses all of the notes and information gathered by Elena to posthumously publish the story of the Iran–Contra affair.

== Cast ==
- Anne Hathaway as Elena McMahon
- Ben Affleck as Treat Morrison
- Rosie Perez as Alma Guerrero
- Willem Dafoe as Dick McMahon
- Edi Gathegi as Jones
- Mel Rodriguez as Barry Sedlow
- Onata Aprile as Cat McMahon
- Toby Jones as Paul Schuster
- Robert González

== Production ==
=== Development ===
Joan Didion's 1996 novel The Last Thing He Wanted was optioned by the producer Cassian Elwes in 2016. In September 2017, it was announced Dee Rees, who had previously worked with Elwes on the 2017 film Mudbound, would direct. Elwes produced the film, under his Elevated Films banner, with financing by Fyzz Facility. The film was executive produced by Jamin O'Brien, Wayne Godfrey, and Robert Jones.

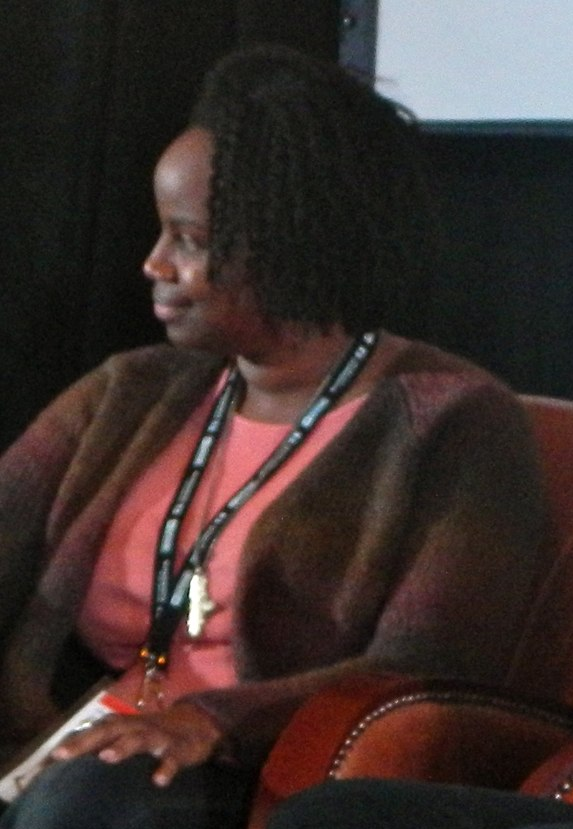
The director, Dee Rees, in 2012

The first draft of the script for The Last Thing He Wanted was written by Marco Villalobos, with Rees writing the second draft. She described the script as a difficult adaptation, as the novel is internally focused and told by an anonymous narrator. Rees was drawn to the character of Elena and her contradictory actions throughout the novel; she wanted to retain Didion's prose but with "more connectivity, because in the book there’s no reason why Elena goes or why she stays". The storyline differs from Didion's novel, with the addition of the character of Alma and the increased role of Jones; in the latter case, Rees intended this theme of Elena refusing to trust Jones despite him repeatedly saving her to serve as a commentary on race that was absent from Didion's novel. This allowed Rees to explore Elena's false confidence and for the audience to "question the idea of heroism, in the big scale we're looking at American imperialism and then Treat in micro is kind of a personification of that idea, in that he is the system".

Many of the changes from the original plot have been criticized by reviewers, including the addition of the scene where Schultz and Morrison discuss the assassination plot. Villalobos and Rees' choice to retain direct quotes from the novel – which come from the unnamed narrator who was cut in the film adaptation – was criticized in a review by the Associated Press as retaining the sense of detachment employed in the novel by Didion without explanation. The same review commented on the choice to portray the fiction story with no explanation of the Sandinistas and Contras, but to introduce the character of the real Secretary of State George Shultz.

=== Casting ===
In February 2018, Anne Hathaway joined the cast of the film. In June 2018, Willem Dafoe joined the cast of the film. In July 2018, Ben Affleck, Toby Jones, Rosie Perez, Edi Gathegi, Mel Rodriguez and Carlos Leal joined the cast of the film. Rees later described the casting of Affleck as important to her focus on Elena trusting the white Morrison over the black Jones; she said in an interview with the Los Angeles Times that Affleck and "all the baggage he brings" brought an important racial awareness to the film.

=== Filming ===
The film, with a budget of $100 million, began principal photography in June 2018 in Puerto Rico. Background extras were scouted for filming in Miami, Florida.

The Last Thing He Wanted was filmed by cinematographer Bobby Bukowski. Rees worked with Bukowski to use the camera to capture the pace of Didion's prose, with a stream-of-consciousness speed. She was particularly focused on the opening of the film, which maintains a momentum of blocking under a narration of the novel's opening passage. Rees was inspired by the films The Parallax View, Salvador and Network, with a focus on pacing and realism. In one early scene, Hathaway and Perez run for an airplane as the camera moves away from them, through the airport and out to the tarmac as they make it aboard the flight. This approach creates "isolation and uncertainty in nearly every frame of the movie".

== Release ==
In May 2018, Netflix acquired the distribution rights for The Last Thing He Wanted after the film was offered to potential buyers by Bloom Media at the 2018 Berlin International Film Festival. It had its world premiere at the Sundance Film Festival on January 27, 2020. The film received a limited theatrical release on February 14, 2020, and was released on Netflix on February 21.

== Reception ==
On the review aggregator website Rotten Tomatoes, 5% of 56 critics' reviews are positive, with an average rating of 3.2/10. The website's consensus reads: "It'll be the last thing most viewers want, too." Metacritic, which uses a weighted average, assigned the film a score of 35 out of 100, based on 16 critics, indicating "generally unfavorable" reviews. Rees, in an interview with Entertainment Weekly, commented simply that "Everybody hated it".

Nick Allen, a critic for RogerEbert.com, called the film "incomprehensible to an almost impressive degree [...] A true Netflix Original Film paradox – not even a pause and rewind button at the ready will help it make much sense." The film was described as suffering from an overload of information, too much backstory paired with choppy editing. Hathaway's acting was praised by Allen, with Affleck and Dafoe described as "professionals on autopilot" and Perez and Gathegi not given a role beyond story devices. A review in Time similarly praised Hathaway for "playing stressed-out and obsessive".

Benjamin Lee of The Guardian wrote, "a two-hour film packed with too much and somehow not enough, The Last Thing He Wanted is a thing that no one wanted." A similar review in the Associated Press argued that the film is "both too small and too large, unable to tell the whole story of the U.S. meddling in Central America and yet unable to really tell the story of one woman, either."

=== Accolades ===
Award	Category	Recipient(s)	Result	Ref.
Golden Raspberry Awards	Worst Actress	Anne Hathaway (also for The Witches)	Nominated	
