= Noel Parmentel =

American writer (1926–2024)

- Born: Noel Edward Parmentel Jr. June 26, 1926; New Orleans, Louisiana, U.S.
- Died: August 31, 2024 (aged 98); West Haven, Connecticut, U.S.
- Education: Tulane University
- Occupation: Essayist
- Spouse: Peggy O'Neill (divorced)
- Partner: Vivian Sorvall
- Children: 1
- Writing career
- Subject: Politics

Noel Edward Parmentel Jr. (June 21, 1926 – August 31, 2024) was an American writer who was a leading figure on the New York political journalism, literary, and cultural scene during the 20th century. He was known for criticizing political figures on the left and right that he considered "phonies". He was credited with introducing a much-quoted question about Richard Nixon: "Would you buy a used car from this man?" He wrote for publications such as The Nation, National Review and Esquire. Parmentel mentored writers such as John Gregory Dunne and Joan Didion. He collaborated on films with Norman Mailer and Richard Leacock and advised Mailer to run for mayor of New York City in 1969.

== Background and career ==
Born in 1926 in the Algiers section of New Orleans, Parmentel attended Tulane University after World War II service in the US Marine Corps, and moved to New York City in the 1950s. There, he quickly became a prominent fixture in literary circles and in political journalism, "the tall, shambling New Orleans freelance pundit," known for his witty essays, usually targeting those he considered "phonies," be they of the left or the right. "Anyone who knew anything about New York then knew Noel," wrote Dan Wakefield in New York in the Fifties, describing Parmentel's making "a fine art of the ethnic insult," dining out on his "reputation for outrageousness," and savaging the right in The Nation, the left in National Review, and both in Esquire. He was "a respecter of no race or tradition or station," his style "that of an axe-murderer, albeit a funny one," in the words of his early protégé John Gregory Dunne; William F. Buckley Jr., wrote admiringly of Parmentel's "vituperative art." In the New York of the day, though "phonies" were proportionately distributed among the political classes, the left was more numerous than the right; Parmentel thus had the reputation in some circles of being an arch-conservative, though he described himself as a "reactionary individualist". (Carey McWilliams, editor of The Nation, credited Parmentel with introducing the much-quoted line about Richard Nixon, "Would You Buy a Used Car From This Man?".) Those he respected as not "phonies" included such varied figures as the sociologist C. Wright Mills, the politician Adam Clayton Powell Jr., the Tammany Hall boss Carmine DeSapio, and Father James Harold Flye, mentor of James Agee.

Among his most widely remembered essays were a piece on Young Americans for Freedom entitled The Acne and the Ecstasy, one called John Lindsay – Less Than Meets the Eye, and one on Henry Kissinger called Portnoy on the Potomac. In 1964 he and Marshall Dodge published Folk Songs for Conservatives, illustrated by the caricaturist David Levine and containing such lyrics as "Won't You Come Home, Bill Buckley," "Hang Down Your Head, Tom Dewey," "D'Ye Ken John Birch", and "I Dreamed I Saw Roy Cohn Last Night", with a companion LP record of the songs purportedly sung by "Noel X and the Unbleached Muslims"; and he and Levine published a booklet of rhymes and caricatures of Johnson Administration figures called Meanwhile, Back at the Ranch.

Parmentel was noted for helping launch the careers of aspiring young writers of the 1950s and 1960s. John Gregory Dunne called him "as close to a mentor as anyone I have ever known. ... He taught me to accept nothing at face value, to question everything, above all to be wary. From him I developed an eye for social nuance, learned to look with a spark of compassion upon the socially unacceptable, to search for the taint of metastasis in the socially acceptable." Joan Didion was mentored by Parmentel and first found an audience for her serious essays owing to Parmentel's recommendations; through his efforts her first novel was published (he is a dedicatee of that novel, Run, River); some aspects of the character "Warren Bogart" in her novel A Book of Common Prayer are modeled on Parmentel.

The lively New York intellectual ferment of the 1950s and 1960s faded with the general decline of the city in the 1970s and 1980s, and Parmentel's activity fell off along with that of the other prominent figures of those golden years. Later on, he published occasional essays, chiefly in The Nation.

=== Collaborations ===
Parmentel was associated in several ventures with the novelist Norman Mailer (who said of him, according to Dunne, "I must love him, otherwise I'd kill him," but who spoke of Parmentel as "a marvelously funny guy.") He appeared in Mailer's films Beyond the Law and Maidstone; it was he and Village Voice columnist Jack Newfield who proposed to Mailer that he conduct his famous campaign for mayor of New York City in 1969. Parmentel worked in Mailer's campaign, and contributed what The New York Times called a "witty article" to a collection of essays about that venture.

Parmentel collaborated with his friend Richard Leacock, a pioneer in modern documentary filmmaking, on several films that became lasting classics, including Campaign Manager, following the activities of the manager of Barry Goldwater's 1964 presidential campaign; Chiefs, about a police chiefs' convention in 1968 in Hawaii; and the Emmy-winning Ku Klux Klan: The Invisible Empire, broadcast on CBS in 1965. He was involved in several feature film projects, none of which reached the screen. These included a film adaptation of Robert Penn Warren's novel Night Rider; a film adaptation of Walker Percy's philosophical novel The Moviegoer, which was to have featured Blythe Danner; a film adaptation of Ole Edvart Rølvaag's classic Giants in the Earth; Mallory, about a character strongly reminiscent of Joseph P. Kennedy; and Missy, about a character strongly evoking a prominent proponent of the Women's liberation movement. The director Jim McBride borrowed Parmentel's surname, and some perceived personal characteristics, for the character played by Charles Ludlam in McBride's film The Big Easy.

== Personal life and death ==
During the late 1950s and early 1960s, Parmentel was in a relationship with Joan Didion. He was first married to Peggy O'Neil, with whom he had a son and later divorced. In his later years, he lived in Fairfield, Connecticut, and was in a long-term relationship with Vivian Sorvall. He died at a hospital in West Haven, Connecticut, on August 31, 2024, at the age of 98.
