= Fixed Ideas: America Since 9.11 =

Essay published in 2003 by Joan Didion

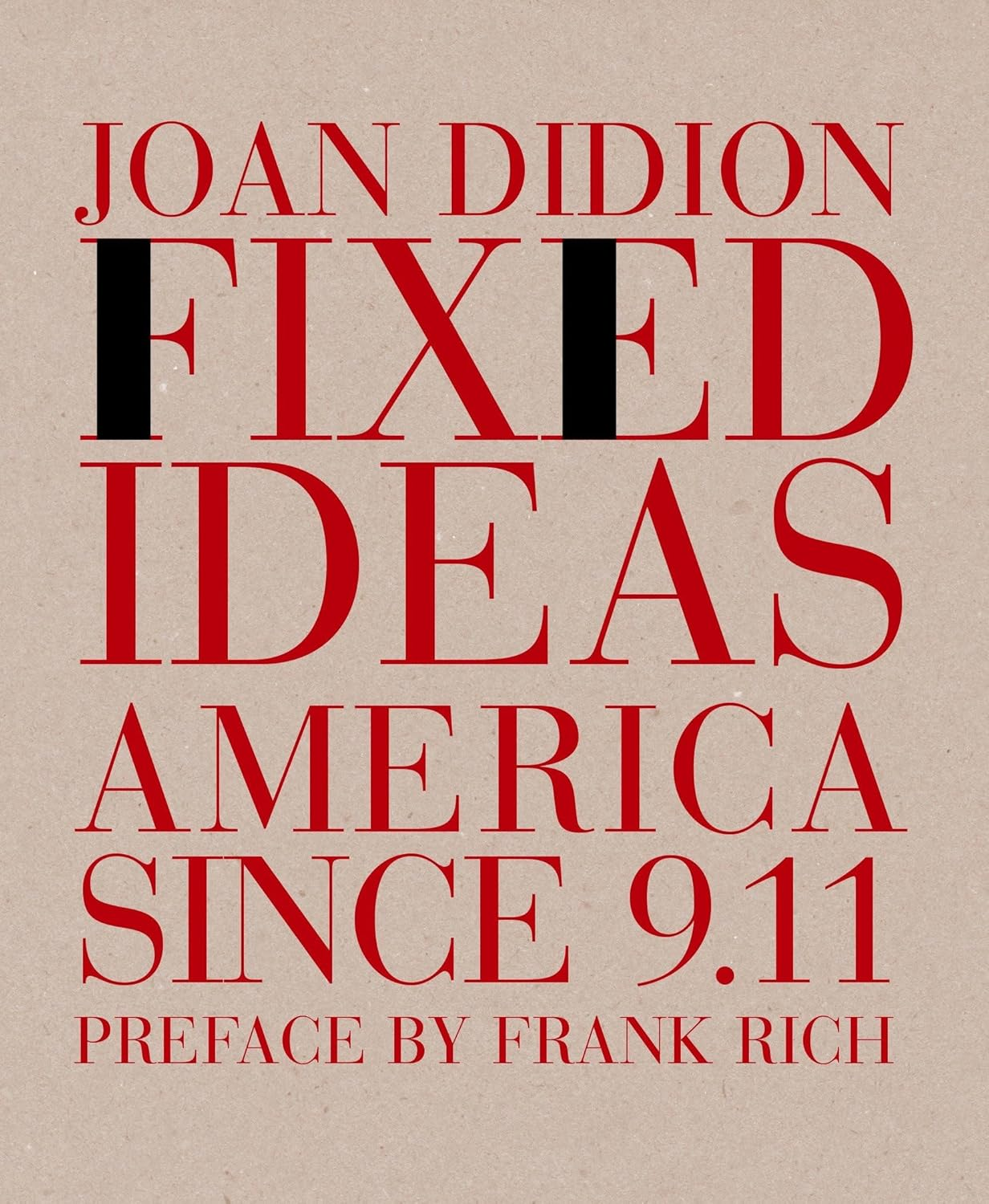
- Author: Joan Didion
- Language: English
- Subject: Essay on American modern political discourse
- Publisher: New York Review Books
- Publication date: 2003
- Publication place: New York
- Pages: 44
- ISBN: 978-1-59017-073-1
- OCLC: 51984914
- Dewey Decimal: 320.530973
- LC Class: E902 .D53 2003

Fixed Ideas: America Since 9.11 is an essay by the American writer Joan Didion in 2002 for a lecture, and then published in 2003. The initial publication was in the New York Review of Books, it was subsequently published as a book. It focuses on how political discourse in the United States has changed, specifically in the light of the suicide attacks on New York's World Trade Center, and other locations, in September 2001.

== Background ==
On 11 September 2001, the United States came under a coordinated terrorist attack, an event that became known as 9/11. By coincidence Didion's book Political Fictions was published on the same day. The author had a pre-planned publicity tour starting a week later, which involved events in different US cities. In Political Fictions Didion suggested that half of US citizens had only "a vassal relationship to the government under which they lived, that the democracy we spoke of spreading throughout the world was now in our own country only an ideality." Didion's biographer Tracy Daugherty wrote that given the timing, and the mood of national unity that arose from 9/11, the book's analysis was not enthusiastically received by reviewers. At one event at the Herbst Theatre in San Francisco, on the book's publicity tour, she found herself weeping on stage after trying to read an extract from her 1967 essay Goodbye to All That, which referred to New York as: "the mysterious nexus of all love and money and power — the shining and perishable dream itself."

== Preface ==
The book version alone has a preface written by Frank Rich. This only makes a brief reference to Didion's text, with the focus more on Rich's own examples of how the "anesthetizing" influence of fixed ideas by members of the political establishment was damaging wider political discourse. His view was that President George W. Bush was shrewedly capitalising on the atmosphere after 9/11 to drown out narratives that did not accord with the administration's 'good versus evil' theme.

== Synopsis ==
Another Didion biographer, Alissa Wilkinson, noted the similarities between Political Fictions and Fixed Ideas, where the essay "fiercely questions dogma that arose in the wake of the attacks". In Didion's words: "We have come in this country to tolerate many such fixed opinions, or national pieties, each with its own baffles of invective and counterinvective, of euphemism and downright misstatement, its own screen that slides into place whenever actual discussion threatens to surface."

Fixed Ideas starts with the 2001 book tour, where she contrasts the open dialogue she encountered with Americans "apparently immune from conventional wisdom" with a New York and Washington doubling down on dissent; where US flags were rolled out in public places across the cities, and where the demands of national unity were allowed to stretch into areas well beyond the strategic imperative, such as the necessity for tax cuts and the elimination of union protections. Postmodernism was to be edged out by "moral clarity" and the end declared to the age of irony.

Didion quoted an interview with the Berkeley academic Steven Weber who said that in the weeks immediately after 9/11 there was a desire to understand foreign policy and Islam, but for some reason this got short-circuited by November 2001, and replaced with a narrative which simply queried "what's wrong with the Islamic world?". The potentially constructive dialogue of late September was replaced with an argument with nowhere to go. This has led to the United States' newly assumed role in the world being deemed to be to wage perpetual war, justified by the insistent arguments of 9/11.

One particular fixed idea has emerged from this: The demise of the former Soviet Union had led to an inevitable American ascendancy, labelled by Charles Krauthammer as a "uniquely benign imperium", or as Didion would rephrase it: "a mantle of beneficent power that all nations except rogue nations — whatever they may say on the subject — were yearning for us to assume." Didion queried whether these fixed ideas had much currency outside Washington and New York, and suggested this was a disconnect between government and citizens.

== Publication ==
The essay was originally delivered by the author as the Robert B. Silvers Lecture at the New York Public Library on 13 November 2002. It was then printed in the New York Review of Books, published on 16 January 2003, under the title Fixed Opinions, or The Hinge of History. The book appeared in May 2003, published by New York Review Books, with the title of Fixed Ideas: America Since 9.11.

The essay is approximately 6,200 words long, in three chapters. The book format has 44 pages for the essay, of which the text occupies 42 pages. The book version has an eight page preface by Frank Rich of the New York Times.

More recently the essay has been included in Didion's collected works, Memoirs & Later Writings. There is an Italian language version of the book, translated by Cristina Cecchi.

== Reception ==
Donna Seaman described Fixed Ideas as "an essential work of clarity in the time of obfuscation." In the reviewer's opinion, Didion's proven ability was to place recent events into their political and historic contexts, and to articulate the machinations and the spin of government messaging, which overtly oversimplified complex arguments.

Writing 19 years after the appearance of the essay, Avi Garfinkel of Haaretz noted the relevance of Didion's perspective to the political narrative in Israel. The essay highlighted Didion's view that an example of fixed ideas was how the president of Harvard indicated that criticism of the Israeli government was often seen as veering on antisemitism, by intent or effect. Garfinkel's review, with the headline "The Joan Didion essay that Israelis should read", noted a stronger parallel on the essay's main thrust, relating the United States' approach after 9/11 with the way the Israeli government frames discussions about peace and security.

A rather different perspective was presented in Bruce Bawer's obituary of Didion in The American Spectator, where he described Fixed Ideas as a "chillingly ugly little book", and that Didion's elitism, and reluctance to speak positively about her country, was, in his opinion, unbearable.
