= After Henry (book) =

1992 book of essays by Joan Didion

- First edition
- Author: Joan Didion
- Language: English
- Genre: Essays
- Publisher: Simon & Schuster
- Publication date: May 1992
- Publication place: United States
- Media type: Print (hardcover and paperback)
- Pages: 319
- ISBN: 0-671-72731-1
- OCLC: 27173966

After Henry is a 1992 book of essays by Joan Didion. All but two of the essays of this book are reprinted in the 2006 anthology We Tell Ourselves Stories in Order to Live. "Insider Baseball" and "Shooters Inc." are not included, although they appear in the Political Fictions section of the collection. In the United Kingdom, the book was published in 1993 by HarperCollins under the title Sentimental Journeys, after the last essay in the collection.

== Prologue ==
=== "After Henry" ===
A personal tribute to Henry Robbins, who was Didion's friend and editor from 1966 until he died in 1979. The essays collected in this book were written after Henry's death.

== Washington ==
Two of the three essays from the "Washington" section of the book were republished in 2001 as part of Didion's book Political Fictions.

=== "In the Realm of the Fisher King" ===
Analyzes Ronald Reagan's style of government, mostly through the character of his wife and other handlers. Didion says that the Reagans maintained, in their years in Sacramento and Washington, the sheltered, disconnected lifestyle of "actors on location," living in housing provided by the studio. A refrain in the piece is the public-relations language of Reagan speechwriter Peggy Noonan, putting words to the president's grandiose but vague political vision: "Where brave heroes blank, and during those terrible last days blank..."
First appeared in 1989 in The New York Review of Books.

=== "Insider Baseball" ===
Chronicles the failed 1988 presidential campaign of democratic candidate Michael Dukakis. Didion takes as her central image a campaign stop in which Dukakis, for the benefit of news cameras, tossed a baseball with an aide on the tarmac of an airport runway, an event duly reported as news by a number of journalists "all of whom believed it to be a setup and yet most of whom believed that only an outsider, someone too 'naive' to know the rules of the game, would so describe it."
First appeared in the October 27, 1988 issue of The New York Review of Books.

=== "Shooters Inc." ===
On the occasion of Bush's election in 1988, describes the American political strategy of using brief engagements in foreign wars as "sideshows," treating "other nations as changeable scrims in the theatre of domestic politics." Didion states that, when Bush toured Israel and Jordan, the Jordanian government was instructed to provide a camel for the background of every photo opportunity.
First appeared in 1988 in The New York Review of Books.

== California ==
=== "Girl of the Golden West" ===
An essay on Patty Hearst, written after the release of Hearst's 1982 memoir Every Secret Thing. Didion recounts the history as a Californian opera, and Hearst as an emblematic Californian character in her lack of self-analysis or sense of connection to history, and she illustrates this point with a quote from a survivor of the Donner Party: "Don't let this letter dishearten anybody, never take no cutoffs and hurry along as fast as you can." Didion would return to this quote in her longer consideration of Californian character, Where I Was From, in 2003.
First appeared in 1982 in The New York Review of Books.

=== "Pacific Distances" ===
A disparate series of reflections on Didion's own experiences in the Pacific, centering on the University of California, Berkeley.

- The first section recalls her culture shock at moving from New York to Los Angeles, at first finding the "absence of narrative" in L.A.'s public culture "a deprivation" but after two years realizing "I had come to find narrative sentimental."
- The second section reviews her career at Berkeley, first as a writing student in 1954 and then as a writing teacher in 1975.
- The third section is about the history of the experimental TRIGA nuclear reactor at Berkeley and Didion's sense as a child of the beginning of the Atomic Age.
- The fourth section is about the laser project at Livermore Labs, where nuclear weapons were also developed.
- The fifth section chronicles an extended stay in Honolulu, where Didion rented a house in the Kahala district during a 1980 garbage strike.
- The final section crosses the Pacific to Hong Kong, where 300,000 refugees from the Vietnam War fled in the late 1970s and were forcibly repatriated to Vietnam in 1991.

First appeared in partial form in the magazine New West in 1979 and in The New Yorker under the title "Letter from Los Angeles" in 1989.

=== "Los Angeles Days" ===
First appeared in 1988 in The New Yorker under the title "Letter from Los Angeles."

=== "Down at City Hall" ===
Considers the political longevity of five-term Los Angeles mayor Tom Bradley, focusing on his dealings with real-estate developers and the role of racism and anti-Semitism in his final, successful campaign against a Jewish opponent.
First appeared in 1989 in The New Yorker under the title "Letter from Los Angeles."

=== "L.A. Noir" ===
Chronicles a murder trial suggesting links between Hollywood and Colombia drug cartels: the wife of a man alleged to have been a high-level dealer was accused of murdering a small-time movie producer. The murder was said to have been over anticipated profits from The Cotton Club, and the supposed connection to that movie's producer Robert Evans gave the case a very faint air of celebrity, as did the fact that two accused accomplices in the murder were bodyguards of Larry Flynt. Rumors flew that the case would be made into a book or movie. Didion notes that everyone involved was motivated by unrealized fantasies, from the criminals who killed for a stake in a flop to prosecutors and reporters hoping that this obscure, sordid crime could itself be turned into a glamorous Hollywood production.
First appeared in 1989 in The New Yorker under the title "Letter from Los Angeles."

=== "Fire Season" ===
Describes southern California's annual season of wildfires, the role of the Santa Ana winds, and the way in which fire is a part of the rhythm of a Californian view of the world.
First appeared in 1989 in The New Yorker under the title "Letter from Los Angeles."

=== "Times Mirror Square" ===
Reviews the history of the Los Angeles Times.
First appeared in 1990 in The New Yorker under the title "Letter from Los Angeles."

== New York ==
=== "Sentimental Journeys" ===
Uses the Central Park jogger, sensational 1989 New York City rape case, to examine racial tensions in New York, and the way that the city's fabric of corruption (incorporated by its founding fathers) is obscured and sustained by a sentimentality for the narratives it tells about itself, whether they are true or not. She reviews the differences in the way the case was reported in white- and black-owned media, and contrasts it with cases involving black victims.
First appeared in 1991 in The New York Review of Books.

== Book cover ==
The cover of After Henry is an evening photograph of Central Park's 102nd Street Transverse, known also as the Jogger's Transverse, where the Central Park Jogger crime took place.
