= Play It as It Lays =

1970 novel by Joan Didion

- First edition cover
- Author: Joan Didion
- Language: English
- Publisher: Farrar, Straus and Giroux
- Publication date: 1970
- Publication place: United States
- Media type: Print (hardcover and paperback)
- Pages: 214
- ISBN: 0-374-52171-9
- OCLC: 312968389

Play It as It Lays is a 1970 novel by American writer Joan Didion. Time magazine included the novel in its list of the 100 best English-language novels from 1923 to 2005. The novel has been credited for helping define modern American fiction and has been described as an "instant classic". It is known for depicting the nihilism and the illusory glamour of life in Hollywood, as well as capturing the landscape and culture of 1960s Los Angeles.

The book was adapted into a 1972 film starring Tuesday Weld as Maria and Anthony Perkins as BZ. Didion co-wrote the screenplay with her husband, John Gregory Dunne.

== Plot ==
31-year-old Maria Wyeth's story begins as she is recovering from an implied mental breakdown in a psychiatric hospital in the Los Angeles area. Her journey oscillates between dizzying and domestic, as her acting career slows and her personal life collapses. Her story is revealed though flashbacks and flash forwards.

Maria contrasts her life in Los Angeles with her childhood in Silver Wells, Nevada, a small town so inconsequential that it no longer exists. The daughter of a neurotic mother and a gambling father, who bet on a mine and lost, Maria moves to New York to become an actress. In New York, Maria works temporarily as a model and meets Ivan Costello, a psychopathic blackmailer who has no hesitation exploiting Maria.

In New York, Maria receives news of her mother's death in a car wreck, possibly a suicide. Her father dies soon after, leaving useless mineral rights to his business partner and friend Benny Austin. Maria withdraws from acting and modeling, splits up with Ivan, and eventually meets Carter and moves to Hollywood. Later, we find that she and Carter have a four-year-old daughter Kate. Kate is in a treatment facility for an unspecified "aberrant chemical in her brain". (Note: The Rumpus speculated that Kate would likely be considered to have low functioning autism in the present day.) Maria loves Kate, as indicated by her tender descriptions, her frequent hospital visits, and her determination "to get her out".

When Maria discovers she is pregnant, she is unsure if her husband Carter or her lover Les Goodwin is the father and she tells Carter the truth. Carter urges Maria to have an abortion, and suggests that if she chooses to have the child, he will take full custody of their daughter. Set in a time before the legalization of abortion, Maria must find a doctor who will perform an illegal abortion. Maria follows steps to covertly contact and visit the only doctor who does "clean work" in Los Angeles. Maria has an illegal abortion, performed with local anesthetic, in a house where there are newspapers on the floor. Feeling distress after her abortion, Maria begins to have vivid nightmares about dying infants and rattlesnakes.

An inevitable divorce, and the ensuing social chaos bring Maria to indulge in self-destructive behavior. Maria disengages from her social world as she plunges into long days of compulsive driving, wandering Southern California's freeways, through motels and casinos, drinking and chancing sexual encounters with actors and ex-lovers. After a series of disasters for Maria, infidelity among her friends adds further chaos to her life.

The plot reaches a climax when Maria's friend BZ commits suicide in her presence, choosing to overdose on sleeping pills (Seconal), and Maria does not stop him, despite fully understanding what he is doing. Before overdosing, he offers to share his pills with Maria, implying that he could help her die by suicide as well. Maria chooses not to take the pills and does not stop BZ as he proceeds to swallow them. His final words are "hold onto me", after which they fall asleep on the bed together. Maria awakens to the sound of BZ's wife Helene, screaming as she discovers his dead body next to Maria. Maria ignores the screaming and holds tighter onto BZ's lifeless hand. In not preventing his suicide, Maria is blamed for his death by her friends.

Maria is institutionalized for her inaction in stopping BZ's suicide, under doctors' and friends' assumption that she must have been disconnected from reality at the time the suicide occurred. It is implied that Maria doesn't try to escape her position, but accepts it apathetically. Her institutionalization can be seen as her choice to withdraw from the outside world, rather than a consequence of an actual mental illness or breakdown. From her hospital, Maria turns her visitors away, and plans for a day she might see her daughter again.

== Background and publication ==
Play It as It Lays was author Joan Didion's second novel, after her debut Run, River was published in 1963. Didion gained public attention for her non-fiction collection Slouching Towards Bethlehem in 1968. Published on July 13, 1970, by Farrar, Straus & Giroux, Didion said about the novel, "I didn't think it was going to make it [...] And suddenly it did make it, in a minor way. And from that time on I had more confidence."

The book bears some resemblance to Didion's life, as Didion also had a daughter with a psychological disorder and drove the same car as Maria, a yellow Corvette Stingray. Like the protagonist, Didion lived in New York before moving to California. However, Didion asserted that the book was not autobiographical.

== Themes ==
=== Life as a game ===
This theme occurs frequently throughout the novel, especially in reference to gambling and casino games. Having grown up around casinos with her gambling father, Maria sees life as a game in which every player chooses a strategy, or chooses to stop playing. Describing her upbringing she says, "My father advised me that life itself was a crap game: it was one of the two lessons I learned as a child. The other was that overturning a rock was apt to reveal a rattlesnake. As lessons go those two seem to hold up, but not to apply."

The title of the book, Play it as it Lays, is a reference to advice from Maria's father on playing craps: "it goes as it lays, don't do it the hard way", an idiom with meaning similar to "playing with the cards you are dealt". At the exposition of the novel, Maria describes the recent events of life as such, "I was holding all the aces, but what was the game?".

Furthermore, social interactions can be seen as a kind of game. Maria tries to be a good "player" when she speaks to her doctors: "There are only certain facts, I say, trying again to be an agreeable player of the game."

Death can be seen as the choice to stop playing the game of life. As he is about to commit suicide, BZ says to Maria, "you're still playing [...] Some day you'll wake up and you just won't feel like playing". By choosing to die, BZ decides to stop playing. Meanwhile Maria references her choice to keep living, and continuing to "play" the game of life despite its meaninglessness, in the famous quote: "I know what 'nothing' means, and keep on playing."

=== Nihilism ===
Throughout the novel Maria and other characters reveal a belief in the meaninglessness of life. This theme may be ascribed to depression which the characters experience, to the emptiness of working in Hollywood or as an overarching philosophical theme on life. Many scenes in the book can be seen as an encounter with absurdity and nothingness, as Maria has odd encounters with strangers whom she never sees again. Maria's dark view of life is revealed in quotes such as, "Maria did not particularly believe in rewards, only in punishments, swift and personal."

The concept of nothing occurs in many contexts, such as Maria marking "nothing applies" on her hospital documents, and repeating this thought when revisiting memories of her past. When speaking to Benny about their now-destroyed hometown, Maria says, "there is no Silver Wells", suggesting that finding meaning in past memories is futile. The line "Maria said nothing" occurs repeatedly in several dialogues, suggesting that Maria considers it pointless to explain herself to others.

Maria does not try to find greater meaning in suffering, nor does she ask questions about why suffering occurs and if there is a purpose to it. This view is presented in her opening monologue, "Carter and Helene still ask questions. I used to ask questions, and I got the answer: nothing. The answer is 'nothing.'"

=== Depiction of Los Angeles ===
Play It As It Lays is considered a classic Los Angeles novel, containing many literary motifs associated with Los Angeles and California.

==== Driving, cars and the freeway ====
The interstate freeway plays an important part in both the setting and the plot of the novel, as the protagonist spends her days driving on the freeway as a form of escapism, a motif that is popular in Los Angeles novels. Los Angeles, known as "a city on wheels", has a unique identity as a city designed for cars, due to its flat terrain and relatively late urbanization.

The philosophical themes of the novel have been described as "freeway existentialism" as Maria goes on drives without a destination in mind. Maria fulfills the literary trope of a drifter, a common trope in Los Angeles novels, where protagonists are often depicted driving, either as a way to chase their dreams or to escape their problems. Driving a fast car on the open road is often considered a literary symbol of the illusion of freedom, which is easily achieved in Southern California, where there is a well developed, multi-lane freeway.

Some of the plot developments occur while driving. For instance Maria informs Carter that she is pregnant when they are driving on the freeway. When driving to the house where her illegal abortion is to occur, Maria and the man in the "duck pants" discuss their cars, which brings a sense of normalcy and relief to Maria, "In the past few minutes he had significantly altered her perception of reality: she saw now that she was not a woman on her way to have an abortion. She was a woman parking a Corvette [...] while a man in white pants talked about buying a Camaro. There was no more to it than that."

An ongoing theme is that Maria avoids her problems by driving away from them, and as she sinks deeper into a nihilistic depression, she drives further distances, driving between California and Nevada.

==== Disillusionment in Hollywood ====
Didion is often credited for capturing the atmosphere of Hollywood in the 1960s. Play It As it Lays depicts Hollywood as a "broken paradise" as seen from the point of view of a disenchanted actress, in contrast to the more common, utopian view of Hollywood. The novel depicts the scheming, exploitation, and elitism common in the film industry at that time. In the same way that movie makers manufacture stories, the characters in the film industry manufacture their own image to attain status and fame.

Though themes of narcissism and self-destruction among the wealthy are old themes, seen in novels such as The Great Gatsby, the focus on the inner workings of movie production at the end of Golden Era Hollywood, establish Play It As It Lays as a classic Los Angeles novel. Maria's acting career is on the decline because she walked away from a movie set, damaging her reputation in an industry where reputation is highly important. This leads her to become more detached and apathetic to the social culture around her, and she begins to disregard social conventions and isolate herself from her acquaintances, rejecting invitations to parties and choosing to be alone instead.

Many dialogues between Maria and other characters portray the superficiality and strategy associated with the film industry, as characters choose words carefully to achieve an aim or to avoid direct communication. The few dialogues which depict genuine, heartfelt interactions stand out, such as BZ telling Maria, "hold onto me" before overdosing.

== Criticism ==
=== Reception ===
Considered a classic work of American fiction, the novel has received largely positive reviews from literary critics, but often draws mixed reviews from the public due to its bleak content and unlikable protagonist. The plot has been described by critics as having "cinematic nihilism," and being a "ruthless dissection of American life in the 1960s." It has been positively described as a "terrifying book." In a review of the novel, Joseph Epstein described Joan Didion as a novelist: "her vision is dark, her views are bleak, but she is richly talented." J. Frakes, reviewing the novel in the Book World column of The Washington Post, described the novel as a "scathing novel, distilling venom in tiny drops, revealing devastation in a sneer and fear in a handful of atomic dust." Library Journal described it as "intelligent, well-structured, witty, irresistibly relentless."

Didion's writing style in this novel has been applauded for breaking from literary tradition and making use of a precise, minimalist style, composed of short chapters, some of which are only a few sentences long, leaving the page mostly blank. The style has been described as "short, laser-focused chapters that come in hot and burn out just as quickly like a firework."

=== In popular culture ===
The novel continues to be a prominent work in popular culture. The book has been referenced in the Netflix television series, You. The 1984 single "Rattlesnakes" by Lloyd Cole and the Commotions (a minor UK hit, peaking at #65) was a story about the lead character of Didion's A Book of Common Prayer, with Cole having "inserted her into the landscape" of Play It as It Lays.

The novel is frequently listed as a popular Los Angeles novel by popular culture websites. In a 2023 survey of writers by the LA Times, Play It As It Lays was voted the third most popular Los Angeles book. Literary Hub included the novel in its list of 10 Essential Books That Capture Los Angeles in All Its Sublime, Beautiful Darkness. The independent editorial website Book Riot included the novel in its list "10 of the Best Books About Los Angeles," saying of its author that "when people think of Los Angeles authors, Joan Didion is almost always the first name that pops into their minds."

== Adaptation ==
The book was adapted into a 1972 film directed by Frank Perry, starring Tuesday Weld as Maria and Anthony Perkins as BZ. Didion co-wrote the screenplay with her husband, John Gregory Dunne.
