= The Last Thing He Wanted =

1996 novel by Joan Didion

- First edition
- Author: Joan Didion
- Language: English
- Publisher: Alfred A. Knopf
- Publication date: 1996
- Publication place: United States
- Media type: Print (hardback & paperback)
- Pages: 227
- ISBN: 0-679-43331-7
- OCLC: 255857884

The Last Thing He Wanted is a novel by Joan Didion. It was published by Alfred A. Knopf in 1996. The story centers on Elena McMahon, a reporter for The Washington Post who quits her job covering the 1984 United States presidential election to care for her father after her mother's death. In an unusual turn of events, she inherits his position as an arms dealer for the U.S. Government in Central America. In this sparsely written, quick-paced narrative, Elena struggles to cope with the spies, American military personnel, and the consequences of her father's errors that are waiting for her on a small island in the Lesser Antilles.

== Plot ==
Elena McMahon, the former wife of a Los Angeles oil tycoon, quits her job reporting on the 1984 United States presidential election for The Washington Post in order to care for her father, Dick McMahon, following her mother's death. Her father has arranged an upcoming deal, in which he has been promised $1 million in exchange for organizing the shipment of arms to Costa Rica in order to supply the contra forces in Nicaragua, but he is too ill to escort the shipment. Elena agrees to go in his place but when the plane lands in a remote air strip as opposed to San José, she is forced to evoke the name of her father's partner, Max Epperson, despite not knowing whether he really exists. As a result, she is offered a ride to the capital, surrendering her passport to her hotel. While staying there, an American passport bearing the name Elise Meyers and her photo is slipped under the door of her room and when she checks out of the hotel, her own passport has gone missing. On the instructions of her father's colleagues, she flies to an unnamed island in the Lesser Antilles, unaware that her father has already died.

The story is told by an unnamed narrator, who knew Elena in her previous life as a Hollywood socialite and who is writing a biography on Treat Morrison, a high-level government official in the State Department. Treat is aware of rumors of a proposed assassination attempt on the U.S. ambassador to the Caribbean island on which Elena is staying, Alexander Brokaw. The narrator documents her journey to uncover the plot unfolding on this island, where U.S. special forces have been setting up a base. She discovers that Dick was being set up as a scapegoat for the assassination attempt on Alexander Brokaw, which had been organized by Mark Berquist, a congressional aide, and Bob Weir; it would then be announced that Dick was working for the Sandinista government. As Elena has taken his place for the arms deal, she has also taken his place as the catalyst for the assassination attempt.

Elena visits the American embassy on this island in order to request a replacement passport, she triggers a government investigation by showing the passport bearing the name Elise Meyers to consulate staff. While there, she overhears a conversation in which a Salvadoran man says, "Dick McMahon will not be a problem". She takes a job as assistant manager at a hotel run by an American named Paul Schuster until one night when his friend Bob Weir visits and asks her to take Paul to the airport the next morning. Paul refuses and Elena, confused, returns to her room until she hears the voice of the Salvadoran from the embassy. As a result of the government investigation triggered by her passport, Treat flies down to investigate the situation and becomes romantically involved with Elena. It is revealed that Bob Weir is actually Max Epperson, Dick's longtime business partner, and that if Elena had gone to the airport, she would have been set up as the frontman for the assassination of Alexander Brokaw. Since she did not go to the airport, the assassination target in the plot is changed to Treat Morrison. Elena moves to a different hotel where Treat visits her, under the agreement that she will wait on the bluffs for him to arrive. On the day before he has arranged to escort her back to the United States, she is waiting on the bluffs when a man shoots Treat, wounding him, and Elena is killed by the island's local police as the suspect assassin. Following her death, it is reported by the Associated Press that she was supplying arms to the Sandinistas.

== Reception ==
The book received generally favorable reviews. It has been compared to Didion's previous novel, Democracy, as well as the moral thrillers of Graham Greene. Michiko Kakutani, writing for The New York Times, drew parallels between Jack Lovett, a C.I.A. agent in Democracy and Treat Morrison, as well as between Maria in Play It as It Lays and Elena McMahon. The novel has been criticised for the rigidness of its style and a lack of character development, something that Didion herself addressed in the novel, writing in the voice of her narrator, "I lost patience somewhat later with the conventions of the craft, with exposition, with transitions, with the development and revelation of character". Marie Arana-Ward, writing for The Washington Post, commented that despite this self-reflection, Didion was able to use her characters to reflect the realities of the time and parody the typical American male novel.

== Film adaptation ==
In September 2017, it was announced Dee Rees would direct an adaptation of the film, from a screenplay by Rees and Marco Villalobos. Anne Hathaway, Willem Dafoe, and Ben Affleck star in the film, with Netflix distributing. It received a limited theatrical opening on February 14, 2020, before being released on Netflix on February 21, 2020.
