= Blue Nights =

2011 memoir by Joan Didion

- First edition
- Author: Joan Didion
- Language: English
- Genre: Memoir
- Published: 2011 Alfred A. Knopf
- Publication place: United States
- Media type: Print (hardcover & paperback)
- Pages: 208
- ISBN: 978-0307267672

Blue Nights is a memoir written by American author Joan Didion, first published in 2011. The memoir is an account of the death of Didion's daughter, Quintana, who died in 2005 at age 39. Didion also discusses her own feelings on parenthood and aging. The title refers to certain times in the "summer solstice [...] when the twilights turn long and blue." Blue Nights is notable for its "nihilistic" attitude towards grief as Didion offers little understanding or explanation of her daughter's death. Writing for The New York Review of Books, Cathleen Schine said,

"'We tell ourselves stories in order to live,' Didion famously wrote in The White Album. Blue Nights is about what happens when there are no more stories we can tell ourselves, no narrative to guide us and make sense out of the chaos, no order, no meaning, no conclusion to the tale."

Blue Nights has been called a "companion piece" to Didion's The Year of Magical Thinking, published in 2005, which focuses on Didion's experiences following the death of her husband and hospitalization of her daughter.

== Style ==
Unlike some other memoirs, including Didion's previous work, Blue Nights does not follow a conventional narrative path. Didion's writing is repetitive and nonlinear, reflecting the difficult process of coping with her daughter's death. Didion frequently diverges from the subject of her daughter and often discusses her own life and feelings. Quintana's "fleeting presence" in the book can be said to illustrate the difficulty of coping with a child's death. Other critics believe it demonstrates Didion's "lack of humility," a quality she has been criticized for as "a perennial insider" for her own contributions, or lack of, towards her daughter's decline.

== Background ==
On New Year's weekend of 1966, Joan's friend Diana Lynn brought up the conversation of adoption. Joan and John were struggling to have a child of their own, and Diana gave them the name of the doctor who had delivered her own adopted children. In the early hours of March 3, 1966, Joan and John received a call from that same doctor stating that he had just delivered a baby girl and needed to know whether or not they wanted her. An hour later Joan and John stood outside the nursery with no question, this baby was going to be theirs. During her early years, Quintana struggled with the knowledge of her adoption. Quintana could be heard questioning what would have happened should John not have picked up the phone on March 3, 1966, or if there had been an accident on the freeway on their way to pick her up.

During her early years, Quintana had a multitude of diagnoses for her anxiety and depression. It was not until her adult life that a doctor diagnosed her with borderline personality disorder. The symptoms of such a diagnosis were apparent in Quintana's character. Joan had witnessed these effects: "I had seen the charm, I had seen the composure, I had seen the suicidal despair." With all the confusion surrounding her mental state, Quintana would spend her early adult life self-medicating with alcohol. This addiction led her to meet her bartender husband, Gerald Brian Michael. On July 26, 2003, Quintana married Gerry in the Cathedral of St. John the Divine in New York.

On December 24, 2003, Quintana was admitted to the emergency room with flu-like symptoms. Her illness, which initially seemed routine, would soon become life-threatening. Her father John died unexpectedly of a heart attack on December 30, 2003. The funeral would have to wait until Quintana was strong enough to attend. Afterward, Quintana had planned a trip to Los Angeles whereupon she fell and hit her head exiting the airport. Brain surgery and two years of post-op recovery were not sufficient; her injury coupled with her multiple illnesses would lead to her death on August 26, 2005.

The memoir Blue Nights deals not with Quintana's illnesses or her death, but rather with Joan's mourning process. The memoir covers the timeline of Quintana's life via Joan's understanding of it. Joan struggled to come to terms with her mothering of Quintana and questioned whether she lived up to the title of "mother" and whether Quintana would agree.

== Reception ==
In a New York Times review, John Banville stated that Didion's style changed after the memoir that focused on the death of her husband, The Year of Magical Thinking. Banville states that Didion, having not been able to find an outlet for her grief following the unexpected death of her husband, began to write The Year of Magical Thinking as her way of mourning her late husband John. With Quintana's death, Didion takes much longer to compile her thoughts in a way that she wants them represented. After writing the initial drafts, Didion rewrites in order to make that turn from cold journalistic reporting to more emotional reflection. Didion's struggle to express her grief is explicated by critic Rachel Cusk, from The Guardian: Cusk states, "Blue Nights is in a sense the manifestation of this frailty, the dwindling and fading of the artist's ability to create order out of randomness and chaos of experience". Other critics such as Hellar McAlpin, from The Washington Post, focus more on the impact of the stylistic choices made by Didion, describing the book as "a beautiful condolence note to humanity about some of the painful realities of the human condition that deserves to be painted on traditional black-bordered mourning stationary". Similarly, NPR's Lawrence Frascella describes the book as having "an aching desperation...to reach some sort of shattering revelation about mortality. And this determination — this ferocity — more than compensates for Didion's sometimes suffocating self-consciousness. Ultimately, Blue Nights leaves us wrecked."
