= Play It as It Lays (film) =

1972 film by Frank Perry

- Theatrical release poster
- Directed by: Frank Perry
- Screenplay by: Joan Didion; John Gregory Dunne
- Based on: Play It as It Lays by Joan Didion
- Produced by: Frank Perry; Dominick Dunne
- Starring: Tuesday Weld; Anthony Perkins; Tammy Grimes; Adam Roarke
- Cinematography: Jordan Cronenweth
- Edited by: Sidney Katz
- Production company: F.P. Films
- Distributed by: Universal Pictures
- Release date: October 19, 1972
- Running time: 99 minutes
- Country: United States
- Language: English
- Budget: $1 million

Play It as It Lays is a 1972 American drama film directed by Frank Perry from a screenplay by Joan Didion and John Gregory Dunne, based on the 1970 novel of the same name by Didion. The film stars Tuesday Weld and Anthony Perkins, who previously starred together in the 1968 film Pretty Poison.

== Plot ==
Former model Maria Wyeth, who comes from a Nevada town with a population of 28, is now a successful actress. Unhappily married to, and separated from, temperamental producer Carter Lang, she is also chronically depressed and institutionalized.

Reflecting back on what brought her to the asylum, Maria recalls driving around Los Angeles in her yellow Chevrolet Corvette and spending time with her closest friend, B.Z. Mendenhall, an unhappy man who is gay. Maria has a brain-damaged daughter, Kate, who is being kept in a sanitarium at the insistence of Carter, who resents Maria's visiting the girl so frequently. Maria's secret desire is to live somewhere with Kate and find some kind of joy in life together.

Maria has been having an affair with Les Goodwin, a screenwriter. When she tells Carter that she's pregnant with Goodwin's child, he demands that she get an abortion. Maria goes to Las Vegas and has a fling with a mob-connected lawyer, Larry Kulik. She later returns to L.A. and has a one-night stand with Johnny Waters, a television star who needs to watch his own show on TV in order to get in the mood for sex.

Bored and depressed, Maria steals Johnny's car and speeds off. When she is stopped by police, drugs are found in the car and she is placed under arrest. With her spirits at an all-time low, Maria returns to Las Vegas and finds that B.Z. is equally unhappy. When B.Z. swallows a handful of pills and washes them down with vodka, Maria, rather than calling for help, cradles him and watches him die.

Back at the asylum, a psychiatrist asks Maria why she keeps on playing when she knows what “nothing” (nihilism) really means. She replies, "Why not?"

== Cast ==
- Tuesday Weld as Maria Wyeth Lang
- Anthony Perkins as B.Z. Mendenhall
- Tammy Grimes as Helene
- Adam Roarke as Carter Lang
- Ruth Ford as Carlotta
- Eddie Firestone as Benny Austin
- Diana Ewing as Susannah
- Paul Lambert as Larry Kulik
- Chuck McCann as Abortionist's Assistant
- Severn Darden as Hypnotist
- Tony Young as Johnny Waters
- Richard Anderson as Les Goodwin
- Elizabeth Claman as The Chickie
- Mitzi Hoag as Patsy
- Tyne Daly as Journalist
- Roger Ewing as Nelson
- Richard Ryal as Apartment Manager
- John P. Finnegan as Frank
- Tracy Morgan as Jeanelle
- Darlene Conley as Kate's Nurse
- Arthur Knight as Himself
- Albert Johnson as Himself
- Allan Warnick as TV Panelist
- Jennifer C. Lesko as Kate Lang (uncredited)

== Reception ==
Roger Ebert of the Chicago Sun-Times gave the film four stars and praised the two leads' performances: "What makes the movie work so well on this difficult ground is, happily, easy to say: It has been well-written and directed, and Tuesday Weld and Anthony Perkins are perfectly cast as Maria and her friend B.Z. The material is so thin (and has to be) that the actors have to bring the human texture along with them. They do, and they make us care about characters who have given up caring for themselves."

Molly Haskell of The Village Voice was less enthusiastic, stating that she had "a hard time remembering [the film]."

Vincent Canby of The New York Times found the screenplay and direction "banal", but effused praise for the performances of Weld and Perkins, writing, "The film is beautifully performed by Tuesday Weld as Maria and Anthony Perkins as B.Z., but the whole thing has turned soft." Critic John Simon described Play it as it Lays as "a very bad movie."

Tuesday Weld was nominated for a Golden Globe Award for Best Actress in a Motion Picture – Drama at the 30th Golden Globe Awards in 1972.

On the review aggregator website Rotten Tomatoes, 64% of 11 critics' reviews are positive.
