= Notes to John =

2025 posthumous book by Joan Didion

- Author: Joan Didion
- Publisher: Knopf
- Publication date: April 22, 2025
- Pages: 224
- ISBN: 9780593803677

Notes to John is a 2025 posthumous book by Joan Didion. A largely unedited copy of her journal, it consists of 46 diary entries written by Didion after she began seeing a psychiatrist in 1999.

The book was released on April 22, 2025 by Knopf. It marks Didion's first posthumous release, as well as the first release of entirely new Didion material (as opposed to reprinted material) since 2011.

== Background ==
Didion died in 2021. Shortly after, her literary trustees (agent Lynn Nesbit and editors Shelley Wanger and Sharon DeLano) discovered a journal in a filing cabinet next to her desk in her Manhattan apartment.

Alexandra Alter, writing for The New York Times, stated that "The release of Didion’s post-therapy notes as a discrete literary work will likely raise questions about whether she would have approved of the project." Alter noted that Didion never circulated her journal's entries for editing or publication, and described Didion's known "disapproval" of "literary estates' impulses to put out every last scrap of a famous author’s work" as well as Didion's criticism of a posthumous Ernest Hemingway novel.

== Composition ==
Didion's journal entries start in 1999, the year which Didion had started to see a psychiatrist; as such, they tackle personal, intimate challenges such as alcoholism, depression, and relationship struggles with her family. All 46 entries are addressed to John Gregory Dunne, her husband, who later died in 2003.

According to the Didion Dunne Literary Trust, Notes to John is a largely faithful version of Didion's diary, only correcting typos. The editors have also added footnotes to explain some of the entries' context. The original diary will be available for public viewing via New York Public Library archives starting on March 26, 2025.
