= Jeffrey Berman =

American literary scholar (born 1945)

- Born: January 16, 1945 (age 81)
- Occupations: Literary scholar, academic, and author

Academic background
- Education: B.A. in English Literature; M.A. in English Literature; Ph.D. in English Literature
- Alma mater: State University of New York at Buffalo; Cornell University

Jeffrey Berman is a literary scholar, academic, and author. He is a distinguished teaching professor of English at the University at Albany - State University of New York (SUNY-Albany). His research interests have included literature and psychoanalysis, trauma theory, love and loss, death education, and self-disclosure pedagogy.

== Education ==
Berman graduated with a B.A. in English literature from the State University of New York at Buffalo in 1967. He then enrolled at Cornell University to pursue an M.A. in English literature in 1968, and later, completed his Ph.D. in English Literature there in 1971.

== Career ==
Berman began his academic career at Cornell University as a lecturer in English from 1971 to 1973. At SUNY-Albany, he held the appointment of assistant professor starting in 1973, was promoted to associate professor in 1979, and became a professor in 1988. Since 2007, he has been a distinguished teaching professor of English.

== Works ==
In his 1985 book The Talking Cure: Literary Representations of Psychoanalysis, Berman highlighted how Philip Roth's discussion of psychoanalysis in Portnoy's Complaint and My Life as a Man was based on his analysis with Hans J. Kleinschmidt, who had written about Roth. Richard Kuczkowski argued that the book needed better editing for "focus and concision", since it gets weighed down by facts that are not "penetrating and illuminating". Ralph Victor, on the other hand, remarked it as a "masterly work" because it produced well-written insights, and made "sensitive and intelligent analyses" of various works by different authors. His other book, Surviving Literary Suicide, examined how readers are impacted by suicidal literature, which includes books and poems that depict and occasionally glorify suicide. Joseph Richman called this book a "fascinating account". However, he expressed disagreements on a few aspects, including the author's interpretations of the "nature of the families in which a suicidal state occurs" and the "nature of the treatment process".

In Risky Writing: Self-disclosure and Self-transformation in the Classroom, Berman investigated the implications of producing work and reading about traumatic issues, as well as how teachers might encourage students to safely express themselves on sensitive themes in the classroom. According to Judith Harris, the book pointed out "certain crucial points" addressing language disputes without making an "overwrought theoretical argument" or employing words linked with "painful emptiness". Carl Goldberg "highly recommended" this book for educators. However, he also raised reservations about the theoretical framework due to the author's "limited understanding" of shame.

In his book Dying to Teach: A Memoir of Love, Loss, and Learning, published in 2012, Berman wrote about the loss of his wife, Barbara. The book presented the power of writing to process grief and recall loss, as well as the need for death education. Kathleen Gallagher remarked the book as a "worthy rumination on the role of teaching", although she criticized Berman's classroom openness, describing it as "foolhardy at best", "unprofessional" and "exploitative". Robin Paletti called this book a "valuable work" with an "insightful approach to the grieving process". However, he also questioned the decision to read Barbara's eulogy in class, characterized it as a "decision motivated primarily by self-interest", which made the students "visibly distraught", and also highlighted his lack of regard for his listeners. In his book The art of caregiving in fiction, film, and memoir, he analyzed care narratives and put together the human story of care with its portrayal in literature, film, and memoir. He also included the tale of his wife's medical condition and caregiving into his examination of literary and cinematic storylines to shed light on various approaches to coping with human aging. Shirley Jordan praised the book's "accessibility and readability" and called it an "absorbing and incisive monograph". However, she referred to the author's structural decisions as "double-edged".

== Awards and honors ==
- 2012 – America's Top 300 Professors, Princeton Review
- 2013 – Honorary membership, American Psychoanalytic Association
- 2017 – Book Prize, American Psychoanalytic Association
- 2022 – Torch Student Engagement Award, University at Albany

== Bibliography ==
=== Selected books ===
- Berman, Jeffrey (1985). The Talking Cure: Literary Representations of Psychoanalysis. New York University. ISBN 9780814710913.
- Berman, Jeffrey (1990). Narcissism and the novel. New York University Press. ISBN 9780814711323.
- Berman, Jeffrey (2012). Dying to Teach: A Memoir of Love, Loss, and Learning. State University of New York Press. ISBN 9780791480502.
- Berman, Jeffrey (2019). Writing the Talking Cure: Irvin D. Yalom and the Literature of Psychotherapy. State University of New York Press. ISBN 9781438473895.
- Berman, Jeffrey; Mosher, Paul W. (2019). Off the tracks: cautionary tales about the derailing of mental health care. International Psychoanalytic Books. ISBN 9781949093155.
- Berman, Jeffrey (2021). The art of caregiving in fiction, film, and memoir. Bloomsbury Publishing Plc. ISBN 9781350166578.
- Berman, Jeffrey (2022). Norman N. Holland: The Dean of American Psychoanalytic Literary Critics. Bloomsbury USA Children's Books. ISBN 9781501373008.
- Berman, Jeffrey (2024). Psychoanalytic Memoirs. Bloomsbury USA Children's Books. ISBN 9781350338609.
- Berman, Jeffrey (2024). Psychoanalysis: An Interdisciplinary Retrospective. State University of New York Press. ISBN 9781438495699.
- Berman, Jeffrey (2024). Freudians and Schadenfreudians: Loving and Hating Psychoanalysis. Bloomsbury Publishing Plc. ISBN 9781350471849.
