= Miami (book) =

1987 nonfiction book by Joan Didion

- First edition
- Author: Joan Didion
- Language: English
- Genre: Political science
- Publisher: Simon & Schuster
- Publication date: 1987
- Publication place: United States
- Media type: Print (Hardback & Paperback)
- Pages: 238
- ISBN: 978-0-88619-175-7
- OCLC: 59878584

Miami is a 1987 nonfiction book of social and political analysis by Joan Didion. The book is based on three extended essays Didion published in The New York Review of Books between May and July 1987.

Miami is an extended report on the generation of Cubans who landed in exile in Miami following the overthrow of dictator Fulgencio Batista in 1959 and the way in which that community has influenced both the city and the United States's foreign policy.

Granta writes, "Miami may be the sunniest place in America, but this is Didion's darkest book."

== Summary ==
Didion describes life in Miami for Cuban exiles and the city's complex racial dynamics. She discusses their role and influence on major events such as the Bay of Pigs invasion, the assassination of John F. Kennedy, the Watergate scandal, the Reagan Doctrine and the Iran–Contra affair.
