= The White Album (book) =

1979 collection of essays by Joan Didion

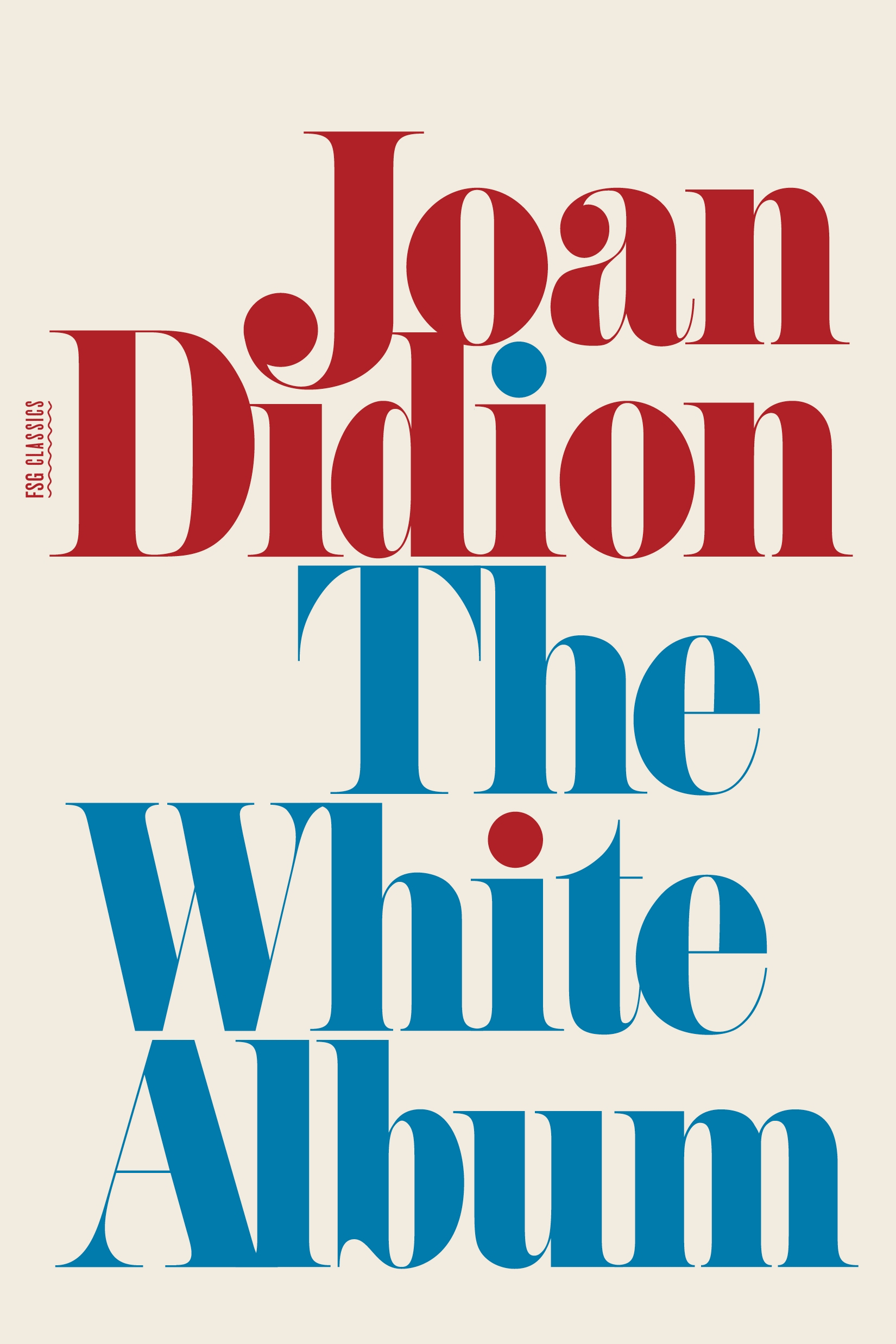
- First edition
- Author: Joan Didion
- Language: English
- Genre: Essays
- Publisher: Simon & Schuster
- Publication date: 1979
- Publication place: United States
- Media type: Print (Hardback & Paperback)
- Pages: 222
- ISBN: 0-671-22685-1
- OCLC: 23163086

The White Album is a 1979 book of essays by Joan Didion. Like her previous book Slouching Towards Bethlehem, The White Album is a collection of works previously published in magazines such as Life and Esquire. The subjects of the essays range widely and represent a mixture of memoir, criticism, and journalism, focusing on the history and politics of California in the late 1960s and early 70s. With the publication of The White Album, Didion established herself as a prominent writer on Californian culture. As critic Michiko Kakutani stated, "California belongs to Joan Didion."

The title of the book comes from its first essay, "The White Album", which was chosen as one of the 10 most important essays since 1950 by Publishers Weekly in 2012. The essay title itself stems from the Beatles' eponymous 1968 album, better known as the White Album. She found the album "ominous and disturbing," according to the New York Times.

The opening sentence of this essay—"We tell ourselves stories in order to live"—would become one of Didion's best-known sayings, and was used as the title of a 2006 collection of Didion's nonfiction.

Martin Amis wrote of The White Album, "(Didion) stands revealed, in The White Album, as a human being who has managed to gouge another book out of herself, rather than as a writer who gets her living done on the side, or between the lines. The result is a volatile, occasionally brilliant, distinctly female contribution to the new New Journalism, diffident and imperious by turns, intimate yet categorical, self-effacingly listless and at the same time often subtly self-serving. She can still find her own perfect pitch for long stretches, and she has an almost embarrassingly sharp ear and unblinking eye for the Californian inanity. Seemingly obedient, though, to the verdicts of her psychiatric report, Miss Didion writes about everything with the same doom-conscious yet faintly abstract intensity of interest, whether remarking on the dress sense of one of Manson’s henchwomen, or indulging her curious obsession with Californian waterworks in these pieces, Miss Didion’s writing does not ‘reflect’ her moods so much as dramatise them. ‘How she feels’ has become, for the time being, how it is."

== Contents ==
The White Album is organized into five sections. The first section contains only the title essay, while the other four sections are identified by a major topic or theme, such as "California Republic" or "Women."

=== I. The White Album ===
- "The White Album" (1968–78)

"The White Album" is an autobiographical literary essay detailing loosely related events in the author's life in the 1960s, primarily in Los Angeles, California. In the course of describing her ongoing psychological difficulties, Didion discusses Black Panther Party meetings, the murder of Ramon Navarro, Betty Lansdown Fouquet "who put her five-year-old daughter out to die on the center divider of Interstate 5", drug-related experiences, a Doors recording session, various other interactions with LA musicians and cultural figures and several prison meetings with Linda Kasabian, a former follower of Charles Manson who was testifying against the group for the grisly Sharon Tate murders. Tate had been an acquaintance of Didion's. The murder trial cast a cloud of fear over Hollywood that seemed to propel many of Didion's insights. The impression conveyed is one of a city and nation pervaded by paranoia and detachment.

=== II. California Republic ===
- "James Pike, American" (1976).
  In this essay, Didion discusses James Pike, the charismatic and controversial fifth Episcopalian Bishop of California, at once eulogizing him and raising questions about his legacy, unpacking the ways in which the diversity of his accomplishments and passions are riddled with contradictions in a manner that makes his character, in some way, a microcosm for the psychology of the state where he was made bishop. A thinly veiled version of this essay is criticized in Philip K. Dick's fictionalized memoir/biography of James Pike, The Transmigration of Timothy Archer, which was published posthumously as the third volume of Dick's Valis trilogy. In the book, Didion and The White Album are given the aliases "Jane Marione" and "The Green Cover" respectively.
- "Holy Water" (1977)
- "Many Mansions" (1977)
- "The Getty" (1977)
- "Bureaucrats" (1976)
- "Good Citizens" (1968–70)
- "Notes Toward a Dreampolitik" (1968–70)

=== III. Women ===
- "The Women's Movement" (1972)
- "Doris Lessing" (1971)
- "Georgia O'Keeffe" (1976)

=== IV. Sojourns ===
- "In the Islands" (1969–1977)
- "In Hollywood" (1973)
- "In Bed" (1968)
- "On the Road" (1977)
- "On the Mall" (1975)
- "In Bogotá" (1974)
- "At the Dam" (1970)

=== V. On the Morning After the Sixties ===
- "On the Morning After the Sixties" (1970)
- "Quiet Days in Malibu" (1976–1978)
