= Democracy (novel) =

1984 novel by Joan Didion

- First edition
- Author: Joan Didion
- Language: English
- Publisher: Simon & Schuster
- Publication date: 1984
- Publication place: United States
- Media type: Print (hardback & paperback)
- Pages: 240 pp (Vintage International paperback edition)
- ISBN: 0-679-75485-7 (Vintage International paperback edition)
- OCLC: 31411030
- Dewey Decimal: 813/.54 20
- LC Class: PS3554.I33 D4 1995

Democracy is a 1984 novel by the American author Joan Didion. Set in Hawaii and Southeast Asia at the end of the Vietnam War, the book tells the story of Inez Victor, wife of U.S. Senator and one-time presidential hopeful Harry Victor, and her enduring romance with Jack Lovett, a CIA agent/war profiteer whom Inez first met as a teenager living in Hawaii.

== Plot ==
The novel follows Inez Christian Victor, the wife of the Senator Harry Victor who ran for the Democratic Party's nomination in the 1972 presidential election and the daughter of a prominent family in Honolulu, Hawaii. Joan Didion serves as the narrator of the novel and defines herself as an acquaintance of Inez, telling the story of her family's life in Honolulu, where her mother, Carol Christian, abandoned her husband Paul and her daughters Inez and Janet when they were young. Inez met Jack Lovett, an undefined intelligence agent, when she was seventeen.

In 1975, Inez's father shoots and kills her sister Janet Ziegler and a Hawaiian congressman, Wendell Omura. Shortly after, Inez's daughter Jessie runs away to Vietnam and Inez and Jack leave her sister's funeral to fly to Kuala Lumpur, from where Jack flies to Vietnam to find Jessie during the Saigon evacuation. The novel ends with Jack dying in a pool in Kuala Lumpur and Inez staying on in the country to work in refugee camps.

== Background and publication ==
Democracy, Joan Didion's fourth novel, was published on April 25, 1984, by Simon & Schuster. The novel's title came from the 1880 novel by Henry Adams, Democracy: An American Novel, which focuses on Ulysses S. Grant's second term as president of the United States. A review by Mary McCarthy in The New York Times noted the influence of the writings of Joseph Conrad on the novel and compared the ending to that of "The Cocktail Party" by T. S. Eliot.

McCarthy similarly commented that Harry Victor seemed to be modelled off the Kennedys, notably his womanizing and his wife's rumored alcoholism. The novel focuses on a satire of liberal politics that is exemplified by Harry, who names his son Adlai, gets tear-gassed at the 1968 Democratic National Convention so it can be photographed by Life magazine and uses phrases such as "I happen to believe". He is compared throughout the novel with Jack, who might be running coups, but takes action rather than resorting to theory.

== Reception ==
Democracy received mixed reviews, including a negative review from The Washington Post, which felt that the forced style overshadowed the underdeveloped plot. Kirkus Reviews commented that the novel had some witty lines of dialogue and Didion's characteristic details but that it was "a chic literary objet with a thin soap-opera center". The style has been compared to constructing a jigsaw puzzle, noted for its repetition and the suspense that this style builds in the narrative. Thomas Edwards described it in The New York Review of Books as "absorbing, immensely intelligent, and witty, and it finally earns its complexity of form".

Despite its mixed reception, Didion said in an interview in 2020 that Democracy was the book that she was the most proud of.
