= Joan Didion =

American writer (1934–2021)

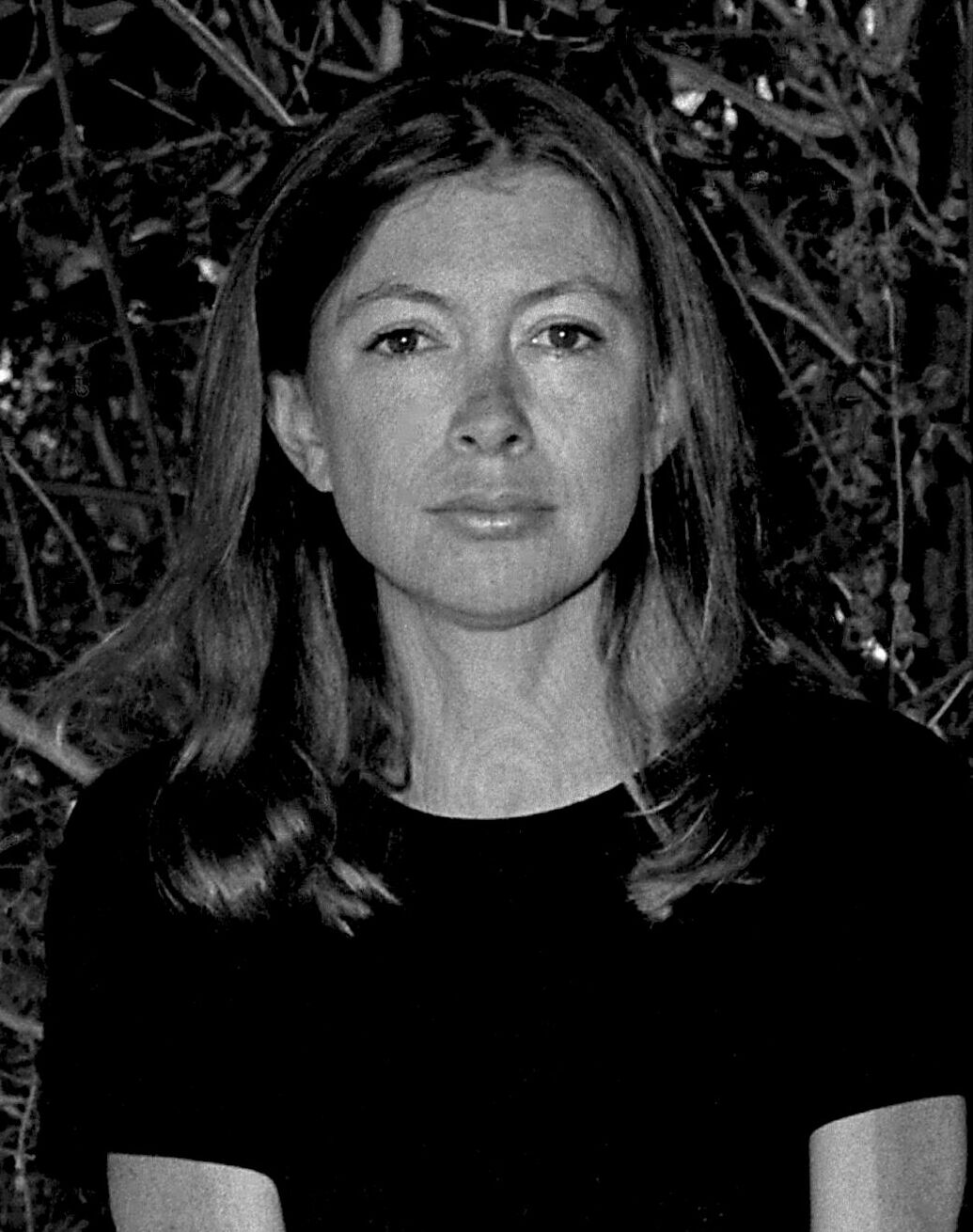
- Didion in 1970
- Born: December 5, 1934; Sacramento, California, U.S.
- Died: December 23, 2021 (aged 87); New York City, U.S.
- Education: University of California, Berkeley (BA)
- Occupations: Essayist; journalist; novelist; memoirist; screenwriter
- Spouse: John Gregory Dunne (m. 1964; died 2003)
- Children: 1
- Relatives: Dominick Dunne (brother-in-law); Griffin Dunne (nephew); Dominique Dunne (niece); Hannah Dunne (great-niece)
- Writing career
- Period: 1956–2021
- Notable works: Slouching Towards Bethlehem (1968); Play It as It Lays (1970); The White Album (1979); The Year of Magical Thinking (2005)
- Movement: New Journalism

Joan Didion (/ˈdɪdiən/; December 5, 1934 – December 23, 2021) was an American writer and journalist. She is considered one of the pioneers of New Journalism, along with Gay Talese, Truman Capote, Norman Mailer, Hunter S. Thompson and Tom Wolfe.

Didion's career began in the 1950s after she won an essay contest sponsored by Vogue magazine. She went on to publish essays in The Saturday Evening Post, National Review, Life, Esquire, The New York Review of Books and The New Yorker. Her writing during the 1960s through the late 1970s engaged audiences in the realities of the counterculture of the 1960s, the Hollywood lifestyle, and the history and culture of California.

Play It As It Lays (1970), Didion's second novel, is considered a classic work of American fiction; Time magazine included the novel in its list of the 100 best English-language novels from 1923 to 2005. Didion's political writing in the 1980s and 1990s concentrated on political rhetoric and the United States's foreign policy in Latin America. In 1991, she wrote the earliest mainstream media article to suggest that the Central Park Five had been wrongfully convicted.

With her husband John Gregory Dunne, Didion wrote screenplays including The Panic in Needle Park (1971), A Star Is Born (1976), and Up Close & Personal (1996). In 2005, she won the National Book Award for Nonfiction and was a finalist for both the National Book Critics Circle Award and the Pulitzer Prize for The Year of Magical Thinking, a memoir of the year following the sudden death of her husband. She later adapted the book into a play that premiered on Broadway in 2007. In 2013, she was awarded the National Humanities Medal by President Barack Obama. Didion was profiled in the 2017 Netflix documentary The Center Will Not Hold, directed by her nephew Griffin Dunne.

== Early life and education ==
Didion was born on December 5, 1934, in Sacramento, California, to Eduene (née Jerrett) and Frank Reese Didion. She had one brother, five years her junior, James Jerrett Didion, who became a real estate executive. Didion recalled writing things down as early as age five, although she said she never saw herself as a writer until after her work had been published. She identified as a "shy, bookish child", an avid reader, who pushed herself to overcome social anxiety through acting and public speaking. During her adolescence, she would type out Ernest Hemingway's works to learn how his sentence structures worked.

Didion's early education was nontraditional. She attended kindergarten and first grade, but, because her father was a finance officer in the Army Air Corps and the family constantly relocated, she did not attend school regularly. In 1943 or early 1944, her family returned to Sacramento, and her father went to Detroit to negotiate defense contracts for World War II. Didion wrote in her 2003 memoir Where I Was From that moving so often made her feel as if she were a perpetual outsider.

Didion received a B.A. in English from University of California, Berkeley, in 1956. During her senior year, she won first place in the "Prix de Paris" essay contest, sponsored by Vogue, and was awarded a job as a research assistant at the magazine. The topic of her winning essay was the San Francisco architect William Wurster.

== Career ==
=== Vogue ===
During her seven years at Vogue, from 1956 to 1964, Didion worked her way up from promotional copywriter to associate feature editor. Mademoiselle published Didion's article "Berkeley's Giant: The University of California" in January 1960. While at Vogue, and homesick for California, she wrote her first novel, Run, River (1963), about a Sacramento family as it comes apart. Writer and friend John Gregory Dunne helped her edit the book. John—the younger brother of author, businessman, and television mystery show host Dominick Dunne—was writing for Time magazine at the time. He and Didion married in 1964.

The couple moved to Los Angeles in 1964, intending to stay only temporarily, but California remained their home for the next 20 years. In 1966, they adopted a daughter, whom they named Quintana Roo Dunne. The couple wrote many newsstand-magazine assignments. "She and Dunne started doing that work with an eye to covering the bills, and then a little more," Nathan Heller reported in The New Yorker. "Their [Saturday Evening] Post rates allowed them to rent a tumbledown Hollywood mansion, buy a banana-colored Corvette Stingray, raise a child, and dine well."

In Los Angeles, they settled in Los Feliz from 1963 to 1971, and then, after living in Malibu for eight years, she and Dunne moved to Brentwood Park, a quiet, affluent residential neighborhood. Didion wrote in her later Notes to John she felt "for years" that she and Dunne had "failed their daughter". When Quintana was five years old, she phoned the state psychiatric facility in Ventura County to find out what she needed to do if she was "going crazy". At a later time, she called 20th Century Fox to ask them what she needed to do to be a star, while, at the age of thirteen, she spoke to Didion of "the novel I'm writing just to show you".

=== Slouching Towards Bethlehem ===
In 1968, Didion published her first nonfiction book, Slouching Towards Bethlehem, a collection of magazine pieces about her experiences in California. Cited as an example of New Journalism, it used novel-like writing to cover the non-fiction realities of hippie counterculture, particularly in the Haight-Ashbury neighborhood of San Francisco. She wrote from a personal perspective, adding her own feelings and memories to situations, inventing details and quotes to make the stories more vivid, and using metaphors to give the reader a better understanding of the disordered subjects of her essays: politicians, artists, or just people living an American life. The New York Times characterized the "grace, sophistication, nuance, [and] irony" of her writing.

=== 1970s ===
Didion's novel Play It as It Lays, set in Hollywood, was published in 1970, and A Book of Common Prayer appeared in 1977. In 1979, she published The White Album, another collection of her magazine pieces from Life, Esquire, The Saturday Evening Post, The New York Times, and The New York Review of Books. In The White Album's title essay, Didion documented an episode she experienced in the summer of 1968. After undergoing psychiatric evaluation, she was diagnosed as having had an attack of vertigo and nausea. After periods of partial blindness in 1972, she was diagnosed with multiple sclerosis, but remained in remission throughout her life. In her essay entitled "In Bed", Didion explained that she experienced chronic migraines.

Dunne and Didion worked closely for most of their careers. Much of their writing is therefore intertwined. They co-wrote a number of screenplays, including a 1972 film adaptation of her novel Play It as It Lays that starred Anthony Perkins and Tuesday Weld and the screenplay for the 1976 film of A Star is Born. They also spent several years adapting the biography of journalist Jessica Savitch into the 1996 Robert Redford and Michelle Pfeiffer film, Up Close & Personal.

=== 1980s and 1990s ===
Didion's book-length essay Salvador (1983) was written after a two-week trip to El Salvador with her husband. The next year, she published the novel Democracy, the story of a long, but unrequited love affair between a wealthy heiress and an older man, a CIA officer, against the background of the Cold War and the Vietnam War. Her 1987 nonfiction book Miami looked at the different communities in that city. In 1988, the couple moved from California to New York City.

In a prescient New York Review of Books piece of 1991, a year after the various trials of the Central Park Five, Didion dissected serious flaws in the prosecution's case, making her the earliest mainstream writer to view the guilty verdicts as miscarriages of justice. She suggested the defendants were found guilty because of a sociopolitical narrative with racial overtones that clouded the judgment of the court. In 1992, Didion published After Henry, a collection of twelve geographical essays and a personal memorial for Henry Robbins, who was Didion's friend and editor until his death in 1979. She published The Last Thing He Wanted, a romantic thriller, in 1996.

=== The Year of Magical Thinking ===
In 2003, Didion's daughter Quintana Roo Dunne developed pneumonia that progressed to septic shock and she was comatose in an intensive-care unit when Didion's husband suddenly died of a heart attack on December 30. Didion delayed his funeral arrangements for approximately three months until Quintana was well enough to attend. While in Los Angeles after the funeral, Quintana fell at the airport, hit her head on the pavement, and required brain surgery for hematoma.

On October 4, 2004, at the age of 70, Didion began writing The Year of Magical Thinking, documenting her response to the death of her husband and the severe illness of their daughter. She finished the manuscript on the following New Year's Eve. This was her first nonfiction book that was not a collection of magazine assignments. After progressing toward recovery in 2004, Quintana died of acute pancreatitis on August 26, 2005, at age 39, during Didion's New York promotion for The Year of Magical Thinking. Didion said that she found the book-tour process therapeutic during her period of mourning. The book was called a "masterpiece of two genres: memoir and investigative journalism" and won several awards. Didion wrote about Quintana's death in her 2011 book, Blue Nights.

=== 2000s ===
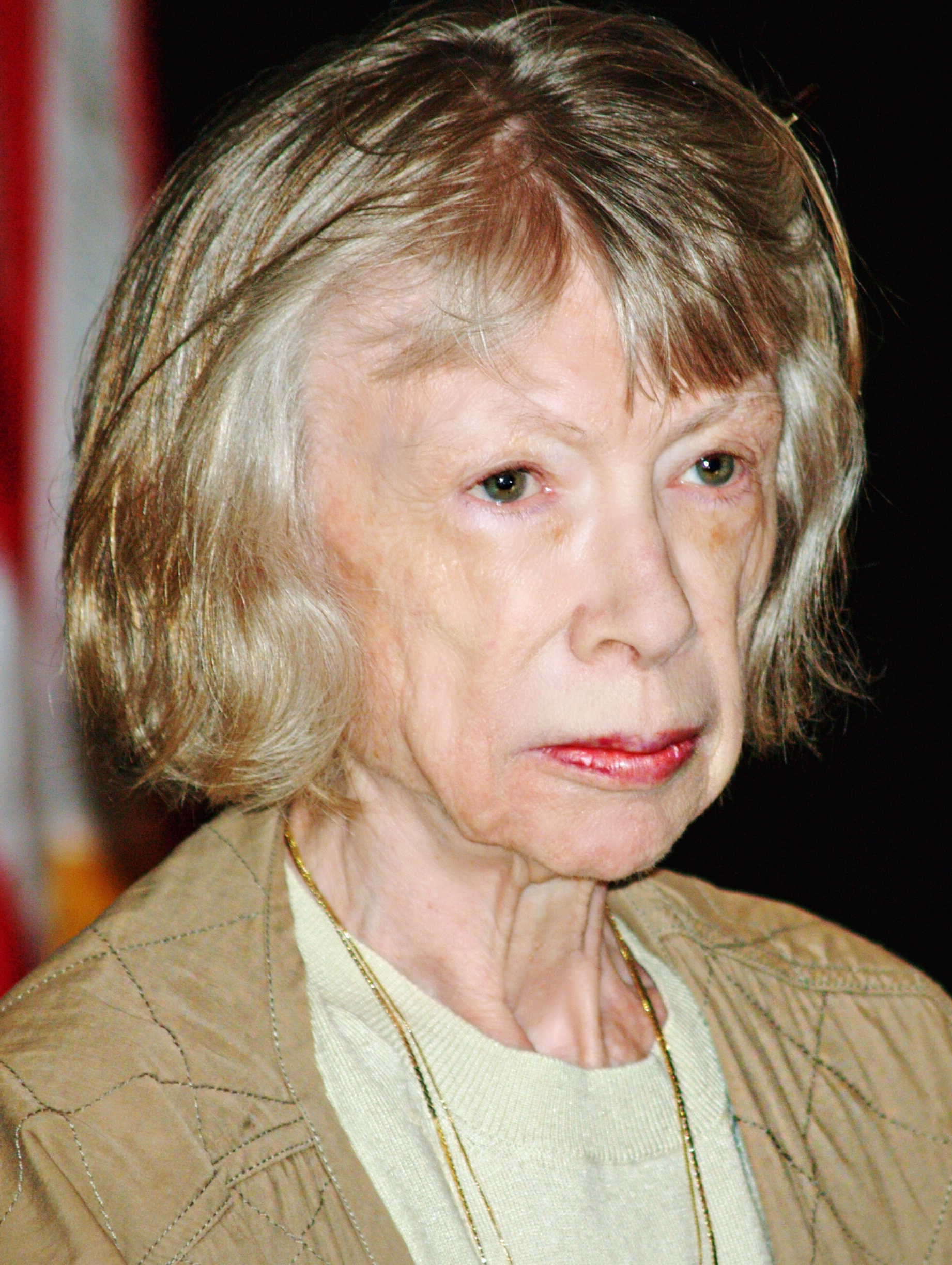
Didion at the Brooklyn Book Festival in 2008

Didion was living in an apartment on East 71st Street in Manhattan in 2005. Everyman's Library published We Tell Ourselves Stories in Order to Live, a 2006 compendium of much of Didion's writing, including the full content of her first seven published nonfiction books (Slouching Towards Bethlehem, The White Album, Salvador, Miami, After Henry, Political Fictions, and Where I Was From), with an introduction by her contemporary, the critic John Leonard.

Didion began working with English playwright and director David Hare on a one-woman stage adaptation of The Year of Magical Thinking in 2007. Produced by Scott Rudin, the Broadway play featured Vanessa Redgrave. Although Didion was hesitant to write for the theater, she eventually found the genre, which was new to her, exciting. Didion wrote early drafts of the screenplay for an untitled HBO biopic directed by Robert Benton on Katharine Graham. Sources say it may trace the paper's reporting on the Watergate scandal.

=== Later works ===
In 2011, Knopf published Blue Nights, a memoir about aging that also focused on Didion's relationship with her late daughter. More generally, the book deals with the anxieties Didion experienced about adopting and raising a child, as well as the aging process.

In 2012, New York magazine announced that Didion and Todd Field were "co-writing a screenplay". The project titled As it Happens was a political thriller that never came to fruition, as they couldn't find a studio to properly back it. Ultimately Field was to become the only writer, other than Dunne, with whom Didion would ever collaborate. He paid tribute to her in a scene for his movie Tár wherein the title character returns to her childhood bedroom and peers at "little boxes" labeled precisely the way Didion describes Quintana's in Blue Nights

A photograph of Didion shot by Juergen Teller was used as part of the 2015 spring-summer campaign of the luxury French fashion brand Céline, while previously the clothing company Gap had featured her in a 1989 campaign. Didion's nephew Griffin Dunne directed a 2017 Netflix documentary about her, Joan Didion: The Center Will Not Hold. In it, Didion discusses her writing and personal life, including the deaths of her husband and daughter, adding context to her books The Year of Magical Thinking and Blue Nights. In 2021, Didion published Let Me Tell You What I Mean, a collection of 12 essays she wrote between 1968 and 2000.

== Death ==
Didion died from complications of Parkinson's disease at her home in Manhattan on December 23, 2021, at the age of 87.

== Writing style and themes ==
Didion viewed the structure of the sentence as essential to her work. In the New York Times article "Why I Write" (1976), she remarked, "To shift the structure of a sentence alters the meaning of that sentence, as definitely and inflexibly as the position of a camera alters the meaning of the object photographed ... The arrangement of the words matters, and the arrangement you want can be found in the picture in your mind ... The picture tells you how to arrange the words and the arrangement of the words tells you, or tells me, what's going on in the picture."

Didion was heavily influenced by Ernest Hemingway, whose writing she credited as having taught her the importance of how sentences work in a text. Her other influences included George Eliot and Henry James, who wrote "perfect, indirect, complicated sentences". Didion was also an observer of journalists, believing the difference between the process of fiction and nonfiction is the element of discovery that takes place in nonfiction, which happens not during the writing, but during the research.

Rituals were a part of Didion's creative process. At the end of the day, she would take a break from writing to remove herself from the "pages", saying that without the distance, she could not make proper edits. She would end her day by cutting out and editing prose, not reviewing the work until the following day. She would sleep in the same room as her work, saying: "That's one reason I go home to Sacramento to finish things. Somehow the book doesn't leave you when you're right next to it." Among her common themes is her home state of California, with which she has been strongly associated.

In a notorious 1980 essay, "Joan Didion: Only Disconnect," Barbara Grizzuti Harrison called Didion a "neurasthenic Cher" whose style was "a bag of tricks" and whose "subject is always herself". In 2011, New York magazine reported that the Harrison criticism "still gets her (Didion's) hackles up, decades later". Critic Hilton Als suggested that Didion is reread often "because of the honesty of the voice."

== Personal life ==
From 1957 to 1962, Didion was in a relationship with Noel E. Parmentel Jr., a political pundit on the New York literary and cultural scene. Didion wished to have a baby, but Parmentel felt he had already failed at marriage and ruled out a conventional domestic arrangement. Parmentel introduced Didion to Gregory Dunne as a potential husband, and they were friends for six years before embarking on a romantic relationship.

Dunne later recalled that at a celebratory lunch with her after he finished reading the galleys for her first novel, Run, River, "while [h]er [significant] other was out of town, it happened." They married in January 1964. In 1966, while living in Los Angeles, they adopted a daughter, whom they named Quintana Roo Dunne. Didion and Dunne remained together until his death from a heart attack in 2003.

Parmentel, who had championed and found publishers for Didion's work, was angered by what he felt was a thinly veiled portrait of him in her 1977 novel, A Book of Common Prayer. In 1996, breaking a long-held silence on Didion, Parmentel was interviewed for an article about her in New York magazine. In Notes to John, Didion wrote of discussing the relationship with her psychiatrist, telling him that Parmentel had hit her and had a drinking problem.

She also said, of his lawsuit, that the character was "more or less" based on him, but "basing a character on him wasn't really the problem—the problem was that the 'character' did something in the novel that this person had done in real life and didn't want people to know about ... [T]he character had beaten up a woman in circumstances pretty much the same as this person had beaten up a woman I knew. Or so I had believed."

Didion was a cancer survivor, but kept her treatment secret from everyone except Dunne, even getting her radiation treatments at a location in northern Manhattan where she believed she was less likely to run into people she knew. A Republican in her early years, Didion later drifted toward the Democratic Party, "without ever quite endorsing [its] core beliefs". As late as 2011, she smoked precisely five cigarettes per day.

== Awards and honors ==
- 1981: Elected to the American Academy of Arts and Letters
- 1996: Edward MacDowell Medal
- 2002: St. Louis Literary Award from the Saint Louis University Library Associates
- 2002: George Polk Book Award for Political Fictions
- 2005: National Book Award for Nonfiction for The Year of Magical Thinking
- 2006: American Academy of Achievement's Golden Plate Award
- 2006: Elected to the American Philosophical Society
- 2007: Prix Médicis for The Year of Magical Thinking
- 2007: National Book Foundation's Medal for Distinguished Contribution to American Letters
- 2007: Writers Guild of America Evelyn F. Burkey Award
- 2009: Honorary Doctor of Letters, Harvard University
- 2011: Honorary Doctor of Letters, Yale University
- 2013: National Humanities Medal
- 2013: Lifetime Achievement Award, PEN Center USA

== Joan Didion: What She Means Exhibition ==
The Hammer Museum at University of California, Los Angeles, organized the exhibition Joan Didion: What She Means. Curated by The New Yorker contributor and writer Hilton Als, the group show was on view from 2022 and traveled to the Pérez Art Museum Miami in 2023. The exhibition pays homage to Didion through the lens of nearly 50 modern and contemporary international artists such as Félix González-Torres to Betye Saar, Vija Celmins, Maren Hassinger, Silke Otto-Knapp, John Koch, Ed Ruscha, and Pat Steir, among others.

== Published works ==
=== Fiction ===
- Run, River (1963)
- Play It as It Lays (1970)
- A Book of Common Prayer (1977)
- Democracy (1984)
- The Last Thing He Wanted (1996)

=== Nonfiction ===
- Slouching Towards Bethlehem (1968)
- The White Album (1979)
- Salvador (1983)
- Miami (1987)
- After Henry (1992)
- Political Fictions (2001)
- Where I Was From (2003)
- Fixed Ideas: America Since 9.11 (2003; essay first published in the January 16, 2003 issue of The New York Review of Books under the title "Fixed Opinions, or The Hinge of History")
- The Year of Magical Thinking (2005)
- Blue Nights (2011)
- South and West: From a Notebook (2017)
- Let Me Tell You What I Mean (2021)
- Notes to John (2025)

=== Screenplays and plays ===
- The Panic in Needle Park (1971) (with husband John Gregory Dunne and based on the novel by James Mills)
- Play It as It Lays (1972) (with John Gregory Dunne and based on her novel of the same name)
- A Star Is Born (1976) (with John Gregory Dunne and Frank Pierson)
- True Confessions (1981) (with John Gregory Dunne and based on his novel of the same name)
- Up Close & Personal (1996) (with John Gregory Dunne)
- The Year of Magical Thinking (2007) (a stage play based on her book)
