= A Book of Common Prayer =

1977 novel by Joan Didion

- 2023 Vintage International reprint cover
- Author: Joan Didion
- Language: English
- Publisher: Simon & Schuster
- Publication date: 1977
- Publication place: United States
- Media type: Print (hardback & paperback)
- Pages: 280 pp (Simon & Schuster paperback edition)
- ISBN: 0-671-49589-5 (Simon & Schuster paperback edition)

A Book of Common Prayer is a 1977 novel by Joan Didion. The novel centers on the story of Charlotte Douglas, narrated by Grace Strasser-Mendana, a member of the wealthy ruling class in the fictional Central American country of Boca Grande. The narrative follows Charlotte's tumultuous journey from San Francisco to Boca Grande, both women's involvement with the American government and "La Republica de Boca Grande," and their journey through grief and personal discovery amidst the backdrop of mounting political violence. A limited signed edition of this book was issued by Franklin library.

== Themes ==
The novel is a story of both personal and political tragedy in the fictional Central American country of "Boca Grande". In 1983 Didion published Salvador, a book of essays on corruption and violence in El Salvador; the fiction and non-fiction reflect a similar perspective of rage and despair.

== Plot introduction ==
The novel is narrated by Grace Strasser-Mendana, an American expatriate who married into one of the three or four families that dominate Boca Grande politics, the Mendanas. Grace was trained as an anthropologist under Claude Lévi-Strauss, and later took up the amateur study of biochemistry, both attempts to find clear-cut, scientific answers to the mysteries of human behavior. Both attempts fail: Grace remains uncomprehending and cut off from the people around her, and in the final line of the novel she admits, "I have not been the witness I wanted to be."

But Grace is not the novel's central character. That is Charlotte Douglas, another American woman sojourning in Boca Grande, although her family ties are elsewhere. Charlotte's beloved daughter Marin has run off with a group of Marxist radicals and taken part in an absurd act of terrorism, and in the wake of her daughter's disappearance, Charlotte's marriage to a crusading Berkeley lawyer (not Marin's father), has fallen apart.
