= Political Fictions =

2001 essay collection by Joan Didion

- First edition
- Author: Joan Didion
- Language: English
- Subjects: American politics, political journalism
- Genre: Essays
- Publisher: Knopf
- Publication date: 2001
- Publication place: United States
- Media type: Print (hardcover and paperback)
- Pages: 352 pp (Knopf hardcover edition)
- ISBN: 0-375-41338-3 (Knopf hardcover edition)
- OCLC: 47913664
- Dewey Decimal: 973.929 21
- LC Class: E839.5 .D52 2001

Political Fictions is a 2001 book of essays by Joan Didion on the American political process.

In it, Didion discusses the presidency of Ronald Reagan, the 1988, 1992 and 2000 presidential elections, the Republican takeover of Congress in the 1994 elections, the impeachment of Bill Clinton, as well as the works of journalists Bob Woodward and Michael Isikoff. The collection includes two of the three essays previously published in the "Washington" section of Didion's 1992 essay collection After Henry.

In 2002, Political Fictions won the George Polk Book Award.

== Content ==
The evolution of American politics and political journalism in the wake of the Reagan Revolution and the Clinton–Lewinsky scandal provide the book's central material.

Didion evolves this into a close dissection of how the press casts and shapes the news, and helps promote a scandal. It is, as Didion writes, a story of "that handful of insiders who invent, year in and year out, the narrative of public life." The narrative, she writes, "is made up of many understandings ... to overlook the observable in the interests of obtaining a dramatic story line."

She implies that this shift to a more purely performative, logistically cynical, media-narrative determined politics is a functionally emergent, if possibly only semi-consciously intentional strategy to mask the American voters' disenfranchisement. As she mentions in the book's foreword, "We'd reached the zero-sum point towards which the process had been moving, the moment in which the Republican's determination to maximize their traditional low-turnout advantage was perfectly matched by the determination of the Democratic Party to shed any association with its low-income base."

In a 2001 essay, Joseph Lelyveld, former executive editor of The New York Times, asked, "Who can deny that this is a reasonable view of reality?"

Political Fictions includes a foreword by the author and eight essays, all written between 1988 and 2000 and initially published in The New York Review of Books:

- "Insider Baseball".
  About the 1988 presidential election, with a focus on the media's coverage of the campaign. First published on October 27, 1988. It was also included in After Henry.
- "The West Wing of Oz".
  About various aspects of the presidency of Ronald Reagan. Adapted from three essays: "Shooters Inc." (first published on December 22, 1988), "'Something Horrible' in El Salvador" (first published on July 14, 1994), and "The Lion King" (first published on December 18, 1997). "Shooters Inc." was also included in After Henry.
- "Eyes on the Prize".
  About Bill Clinton's 1992 presidential campaign. First published on September 24, 1992 under the title "Eye on the Prize".
- "Newt Gingrich, Superstar".
  A review of Newt Gingrich's published works. First published on August 10, 1995 under the title "The Teachings of Speaker Gingrich".
- "Political Pornography".
  A critical examination of Bob Woodward's post-Watergate work. First published on September 19, 1996 under the title "The Deferential Spirit".
- "Clinton Agonistes".
  About the Clinton–Lewinsky scandal. First published on October 22, 1998.
- "Vichy Washington".
  A review of Clinton Uncovered, Michael Isikoff's book on the Clinton-Lewinsky scandal. First published on June 24, 1999 under the title "Uncovered Washington".
- "God's Country".
  About the role of religion in the 2000 presidential election. First published on November 2, 2000.

== Reception ==
In the Yale Review of Books, Jessica Lee Thomas wrote, "The scariest point Didion seems to be making is not simply that politics is a nest of lies, but that we buy into 'the story' like any good novel." In his 2001 essay in The New York Review of Books, former New York Times executive editor Joseph Lelyveld discussed "Didion's great virtues as a political writer," noting particularly her examination of the journalism of Bob Woodward. "For the sheer exuberance of the savaging, Joan Didion on the methodology of Bob Woodward's books is itself worth the price of admission." He calls the book both a demonstration of how "in the end something like a narrative is foisted on the land" and "the freshest application of an acute literary intelligence to the political scene [in] three decades." In Salon, political writer Joe Conason noted, "It turns out that the man who used to run the Times is quite troubled by the quality of journalism during the era when he was in power, though we learn that circuitously, through his endorsements of many of Didion's complaints. He is plainly contemptuous of his old rivals at The Washington Post. He worries that readers regard him and his colleagues as part of a 'self-serving, self-satisfied, self-enriching establishment' that conspires in the creation of a trivial and misleading narrative of our national life. And most surprisingly, he suggests that there was substance behind suspicions of a 'vast right-wing conspiracy' against the Clintons. (Now he tells us.)" In The New York Times Book Review, John Leonard wrote, "Didion is on pure Zen target when she tells us that American democracy has been abducted," and called the book "a splendid sermon."

Conason, in his brief essay, examines implications in Lelyveld's positive reception of the book.

Although he oversaw most of the Times coverage of Whitewater, replete with distortion and omission, Lelyveld avoids mentioning how that fabricated "scandal" led into the Lewinsky affair. He praises Didion's able dissection of the Isikoff–Starr version, an unreliable narrative concocted by prosecutors and their helpers in the press. He doesn't dispute her observation that Washington's "self-interested political class," including the media, "smelled blood, Clinton's." And he forthrightly agrees that the real story was the independent counsel's "headlong attempt" to bring down an elected president, adding that Hillary Clinton's famous remark about a possible conspiracy "was too easily discounted."

What Lelyveld says next amounts to a confession of sorts. "Very late in the game, reporters started tracing the network of lawyers in the conservative Federalist Society, funded in part by Richard Mellon Scaife, that reached into both the Paula Jones defense team and Starr's office," he writes. Students of the subject will recognize how inadequate that description is, but it is apparently the best he can do.

The question he is uniquely qualified to answer, but does not, is why that fascinating and salient story was so assiduously ignored by the mainstream media, including the Times, for so many years. Lelyveld cannot quite bring himself to be candid on that sensitive topic, which is, ironically, the same kind of intellectual failure excoriated so passionately and so precisely by Joan Didion. It is astonishing, nevertheless, that he even tries.
