= The Year of Magical Thinking =

2005 memoir by Joan Didion

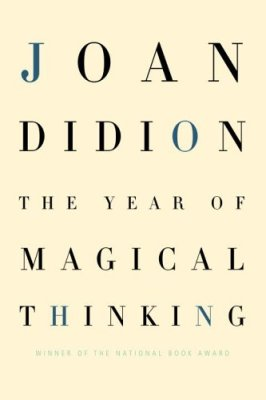
- First edition
- Author: Joan Didion
- Language: English
- Genre: Memoir
- Publisher: Alfred A. Knopf
- Publication date: October 2005
- Publication place: United States
- Media type: Print (hardcover & paperback)
- Pages: 240
- ISBN: 1-4000-4314-X
- OCLC: 58563131
- Dewey Decimal: 813/.54 B 22
- LC Class: PS3554.I33 Z63 2005

The Year of Magical Thinking is a memoir by Joan Didion, accounting of the year following the death of her husband John Gregory Dunne in 2003. Published by Knopf in October 2005, The Year of Magical Thinking was immediately acclaimed as a classic book about mourning. It won the 2005 National Book Award for Nonfiction and was a finalist for both the National Book Critics Circle Award and the Pulitzer Prize for Biography or Autobiography. In 2024, The New York Times Book Review ranked The Year of Magical Thinking as the 12th best book of the 21st century. It was adapted into a play in 2007.

== Structure and themes ==
The book recounts Didion's experiences of grief after Dunne's 2003 death. Days before his death, their daughter Quintana Roo Dunne was hospitalized in New York with pneumonia, which developed into septic shock; she was still unconscious when her father died. In 2004, Quintana was again hospitalized after she fell and hit her head disembarking from a plane at Los Angeles International Airport. After learning of her father's death, she returned to Malibu, her childhood home.

The book follows Didion's reliving and reanalysis of her husband's death throughout the following year, in addition to caring for Quintana. With each event replay, the focus on specific emotional and physical aspects of the experience shifts. Didion also incorporates medical and psychological research on grief and illness into the book.

The title of the book refers to magical thinking in the anthropological sense, thinking that if a person hopes for something enough or performs the correct actions, then an unavoidable event can be averted. Didion reports many instances of her magical thinking, particularly the story in which she cannot give away Dunne's shoes, as he would need them when he returned. The experience of insanity or derangement that is part of grief is a major theme about which Didion was unable to find a great deal of existing literature.

Didion applies the reportorial detachment for which she is known to her own experience of grieving; there are few expressions of raw emotion. Through observation and analysis of changes in her behavior and abilities, she indirectly expresses the toll her grief is taking. She is haunted by questions about the medical details of her husband's death, the possibility that he sensed it in advance, and how she might have made his remaining time more meaningful. Fleeting memories of events and persistent snippets of past conversations with John take on a new significance. Her daughter's continuing health problems and hospitalizations further compound and interrupt the natural course of grief.

== Writing process ==
Didion wrote The Year of Magical Thinking between October 4 and December 31, 2004, completing it a year and a day after Dunne died. Notes she made during Quintana's hospitalizations became part of the book. Quintana Roo Dunne Michael died of pancreatitis on August 26, 2005, before the book's publication, but Didion did not revise the manuscript. Instead, she devoted a second book, Blue Nights, to her daughter's death.

== Reception ==
The New York Times Book Review praised the memoir as "not a downer. On the contrary. Though the material is literally terrible, the writing is exhilarating, and what unfolds resembles an adventure narrative." The New York Review of Books declared, "I can't imagine dying without this book." The American Prospect's mixed review found that the book read "like a Warren Report on the death of LBJ." In 2019, the book was ranked 40th on The Guardian's list of the 100 best books of the 21st century.

== Theatre adaption ==
On March 29, 2007, Didion's adaptation of her book for Broadway, directed by David Hare, opened with Vanessa Redgrave as the sole cast member. The play expands upon the memoir by dealing with Quintana's death. It ran for 24 weeks at the Booth Theatre in New York City and the following year Redgrave reprised her role to largely positive reviews at London's National Theatre. This production was set to tour the world, including Salzburg, Athens, Dublin Theatre Festival, Bath and Cheltenham. The play was also performed in the Sydney Theatre Company's 2008 season, starring Robyn Nevin and directed by Cate Blanchett.

Also in 2008, it was performed in Barcelona at the Sala Beckett, directed by Òscar Molina and starring Marta Angelat.

The play was performed in Canada at the Belfry Theatre in 2009 and at the Tarragon Theatre by Seana McKenna. This production was also mounted in January 2011 as part of English Theatre's season at the National Arts Centre in Ottawa.

On October 26, 2009, Redgrave reprised her performance again in a benefit production of the play at the Cathedral Church of St. John the Divine in New York City.

In January 2010, the play was mounted at the Court Theatre (Chicago), starring Mary Beth Fisher. Fisher won the 2010 "Jeff" Solo Performance Award for her performance in the play.

The play was mounted in April 2011 by Nimbus Theater in Minneapolis, Minnesota, starring Barbra Berlovitz and directed by Liz Neerland.

In 2011, Fanny Ardant played a French translation of The Year of Magical Thinking in Théâtre de l'Atelier, Paris.

The play opened in May 2015 at Teatro Español y Naves del Español in Madrid, Spain, as El Año del Pensamiento Mágico produced by Teatro Guindalera. The production starred Jeannine Mestre and was directed by Juan Pastor Millet.

The Norwegian translation of the play premiered in September 2015 at Den Nationale Scene in Bergen, directed by Jon Ketil Johnsen and starring Rhine Skaanes.

On November 3, 2017, Stageworks Theatre in Tampa, Florida, opened a production of the play featuring Vickie Daignault. Writing in the Tampa Bay Times, Colette Bancroft noted Daignault's "skill and subtlety" and the exploration of grief in Didion's play that was "raw and refined at once."

Beginning in March 2020, the impact of the COVID-19 pandemic forced theatres to close worldwide. In the fall of 2021, productions began to resurface. Cesear's Forum, a minimalist theatre company at Playhouse Square, Cleveland, Ohio, presented the play with Julia Kolibab in a November/December production.

The play adaptation, narrated by Redgrave, was released in audio format on Audible in 2020.

== Translations ==
- Czech: Víc než další den, lit. 'More Than the Next Day'. Translated by Jarmila Emmerová. Prague: Beta - Pavel Dobrovský. 2006. ISBN 80-7306-259-3.
- Dutch: Het jaar van magisch denken. Translated by Christien Jonkheer. Amsterdam: Prometheus. 2006. ISBN 978-90-446-0836-6.
- Italian: L'anno del pensiero magico. Translated by Vincenzo Mantovani. Milan: Il Saggiatore. 2006. ISBN 978-88-428-1382-8.
- Spanish: El año del pensamiento mágico. Translated by Olivia de Miguel. Chicago: Global Rhythm Press. 2006. ISBN 978-84-934487-4-5.
- Chinese: 奇想之年; pinyin: Qíxiǎng zhī nián; lit. 'Year of Wonder'. Translated by Li Jingyi. Taipei: YLib. 2007. ISBN 978-957-32-6004-2.
- Finnish: Maagisen ajattelun aika. Translated by Marja Haapio. Helsinki: Like. 2007. ISBN 978-952-471-891-2.
- French: L'année de la pensée magique. Translated by Pierre Demarty. Paris: Grasset. 2007. ISBN 978-2-246-71251-0.
- Norwegian: De magiske tankers år. Translated by Halvor Kristiansen. Oslo: Tiden Norsk Forlag. 2007. ISBN 978-82-05-36499-8.
- Polish: Rok magicznego myślenia. Translated by Hanna Pasierska. Warsaw: Prószyński i S-ka. 2007. ISBN 978-83-7469-518-3.
- Turkish: O yılın büyüsü, lit. 'The Magic of That Year'. Translated by Burcu Tümer Unan. Ankara: Arkadaş Yayınevi. 2007. ISBN 978-975-509-516-5.
- Croatian: Godina magičnog razmišljanja. Translated by Lara Hölbling Matković. Ivanec Bistranski: Fraktura. 2009. ISBN 978-953-266-118-7.
- Greek: Η χρονιά της μαγικής σκέψης, romanized: I chroniá tis magikís sképsis. Translated by Xenia Mavrommati. Athens: KEDROS. 2011. ISBN 978-960-04-4260-1.
- Japanese: 悲しみにある者, romanized: Kanashimi ni aru mono, lit. 'One in Sorrow'. Translated by Toshio Ikeda. Tokyo: Keio University Press. 2011. ISBN 978-4-7664-1870-5.
- Hungarian: A mágikus gondolatok éve. Translated by Krisztina Varga. Budapest: Európa Könyvkiadó. 2017. ISBN 978-963-405-677-5.
- Danish: Et år med magisk tænkning. Translated by Bente Kastberg. Copenhagen: Gyldendal. 2018. ISBN 978-87-02-26173-8.
- Arabic: عام التفكير السحري, romanized: Am al-tafkir al-siriy. Translated by Shadi Kharmasho. Baghdad: Dar al-Mada. 2020. ISBN 978-9933-604-36-3.
- Bulgarian: Годината на магическото мислене, romanized: Godinata na magicheskoto mislene. Translated by Zornitsa Hristova. Sofia: List. 2021. ISBN 978-619-7596-51-9.
- Russian: Год магического мышления, romanized: God magicheskogo myshleniya. Translated by Vasily Arkanov. Moscow: Corpus. 2021. ISBN 978-5-17-121092-2.
- Serbian: Година магијског мишљења, romanized: Godina magijskog mišljenja. Translated by Alen Bešić. Belgrade: Štrik. 2022. ISBN 978-86-89597-64-6.
- Slovak: Rok magického myslenia. Translated by Jana Juráňová. Bratislava: BRAK. 2023. ISBN 978-80-8286-021-7.
- European Portuguese: O Ano do Pensamento Mágico. Translated by Hugo Gonçalves. Lisbon: Infinito Particular / Cultura. 2017. ISBN 978-989-8886-12-5
