= Where I Was From =

2003 nonfiction book by Joan Didion

- First edition
- Author: Joan Didion
- Language: English
- Genre: Essay, history, memoir
- Publisher: Alfred A. Knopf
- Publication date: September 2003
- Publication place: United States
- Media type: Print (hardcover and paperback)
- Pages: 240
- ISBN: 0-679-43332-5
- OCLC: 57191802

Where I Was From is a 2003 book by Joan Didion. It concerns the history and culture of California, where Didion was born and spent much of her life. The book combines aspects of historical writing, journalism, and memoir to present a history of California as well as Didion's own experiences in that state.

== Synopsis ==
The book attempts to understand the differences between California's factual history and its perceived reputation. According to Didion, "This book represents an exploration into my own confusions about the place and the way in which I grew up ... misapprehensions and misunderstandings so much a part of who I became that I can still to this day confront them only obliquely." Where I Was From is also in parts a retrospective on Didion's own work, examining how these "confusions" affected her debut novel Run, River.

Some sections of Where I Was From first appeared, in different form, in the following essays and articles:

- "Thinking About Western Thinking". Esquire. February 1976.
- "Trouble in Lakewood". The New Yorker. July 19, 1993. ISSN 0028-792X.
- "The Golden Land". The New York Review of Books. 40 (17). October 21, 1993. ISSN 0028-7504.

== Critical reception ==
Diane Johnson in The New York Review of Books summarizes the apparent hypocrisies of California culture that Didion discusses in the book:

Like all California children, Didion had been fed the old stories of California history, but when she eventually came to think about them, she could see they didn't 'add up.' The disjunction between myth and reality was too large, the basic paradoxes of the California psyche too obvious: mistrust of government while feeding at the troughs of public works and agricultural subsidies; unchecked commercial exploitation of natural resources in the very footsteps of John Muir; the decline of education from a place near the top of the nation to somewhere near that of Mississippi; apathy, increasing rates of crime, and crime's related social problems.

In The New York Times Book Review, novelist and critic Thomas Mallon wrote, "The more penetrating and idiosyncratic moments of 'Where I Was From' are the work of someone who can still be very much herself, someone who is even now, arguably, a great American writer."
