= Salvador (book) =

1983 book by Joan Didion on the Salvadoran Civil War

- First US edition
- Author: Joan Didion
- Cover artist: Lawrence Ratzkin
- Language: English
- Genre: Essays
- Publisher: Simon & Schuster (US); Chatto & Windus (UK); Lester & Orpen Dennys (Canada)
- Publication date: 1983
- Publication place: United States
- Media type: Print (Hardback & Paperback)
- Pages: 108 pp
- ISBN: 0-671-47024-8 (UK/US); ISBN 0-88619-015-0 (Canada)
- OCLC: 29389494
- Dewey Decimal: 972.8405/2 20
- LC Class: F1488.3 .D53 1994

Salvador is a 1983 nonfiction book by Joan Didion on American involvement in the Salvadoran Civil War. Most of the book is based on three extended essays Didion published in The New York Review of Books in November and December 1982. She spent two weeks in El Salvador in June 1982 and referred to the experience as "terrifying." Didion was in the country during the 1982 earthquake.
