= Slouching Towards Bethlehem =

1968 collection of essays by Joan Didion

- First edition
- Author: Joan Didion
- Cover artist: Lawrence Ratzkin
- Published: May 10, 1968 (Farrar, Straus and Giroux)
- Pages: 238
- OCLC: 22634186

Slouching Towards Bethlehem is a collection of essays by Joan Didion that mainly describes her experiences in California during the 1960s. It was published on May 10, 1968, by Farrar, Straus and Giroux. It takes its title from the poem "The Second Coming" by W. B. Yeats. The full poem was an epigraph to the book while only the last six lines from the first stanza were included in the title essay as it first appeared in The Saturday Evening Post in 1967. The contents of this book are reprinted in Didion's We Tell Ourselves Stories in Order to Live: Collected Nonfiction (2006).

== Collection's origins ==
According to Nathan Heller in The New Yorker, the book came about this way: "In the spring of 1967, Joan Didion [was ...] engaged to write a regular column for The Saturday Evening Post. [...] At some point, an editor suggested that she had the makings of a collection, so she stacked her columns with past articles she liked (a report from Hawaii, the best of some self-help columns she'd churned out while a junior editor at Vogue), set them in a canny order with a three-paragraph introduction, and sent them off. This was Slouching Towards Bethlehem."

== Title essay ==
The center was not holding. It was a country of bankruptcy notices and public-auction announcements and commonplace reports of casual killings and misplaced children and abandoned homes and vandals who misspelled even the four-letter words they scrawled. It was a country in which families routinely disappeared, trailing bad checks and repossession papers. Adolescents drifted from city to torn city, sloughing off both the past and the future as snakes shed their skins, children who were never taught and would never now learn the games that had held the society together.

— Joan Didion, "Slouching Towards Bethlehem"

The title essay describes Didion's impressions of the Haight-Ashbury district of San Francisco during the neighborhood's heyday as a countercultural center. Didion originally wrote the piece as an assignment for The Saturday Evening Post in 1967. It was republished by the Post in 2017.

In contrast to the more utopian image of the milieu promoted by counterculture sympathizers then and now, Didion offers a rather grim portrayal of the goings-on, including an encounter with a pre-school-age child who was given LSD by her parents. Diggers founders-participants Arthur Lisch, Jane Lisch, Peter Berg, and Chester Anderson are featured in the essay. Didion also quoted from a Diggers communique authored by Anderson that described the sexual trafficking of a 16-year-old girl and proclaimed: "Rape is as common as bullshit on Haight Street." (Note: This text is excerpted from a communique titled "Uncle Tim'$ [sic] Children", dated April 16, 1967. "Uncle Tim" is a reference to Timothy Leary. See image here and transcription here.)

One critic describes the essay as "a devastating depiction of the aimless lives of the disaffected and incoherent young," with Didion positioned as "a cool observer but not a hardhearted one." Another scholar writes that the essay's form mirrors its content; the fragmented structure resonates with the essay's theme of societal fragmentation. In a 2011 interview, Didion discussed her technique of centering herself and her perspective in her non-fiction works like "Slouching Towards Bethlehem": "I thought it was important always for the reader, for me to place myself in the piece so that the reader knew where I was, the reader knew who was talking...At the time I started doing these pieces it was not considered a good thing for writers to put themselves front and center, but I had this strong feeling you had to place yourself there and tell the reader who that was at the other end of the voice."

In her preface to the book, Didion writes, "I went to San Francisco because I had not been able to work in some months, had been paralyzed by the conviction that writing was an irrelevant act, that the world as I had understood it no longer existed. If I was to work again at all, it would be necessary for me to come to terms with disorder."

== Contents ==
=== I. Life Styles in the Golden Land ===
- "Some Dreamers of the Golden Dream"
  Appeared first in 1966 in The Saturday Evening Post under the title "How Can I Tell Them There's Nothing Left".
- "John Wayne: A Love Song"
  Appeared first in 1965 in The Saturday Evening Post.
- "Where the Kissing Never Stops"
  Appeared first in 1966 in The New York Times Magazine under the title "Just Folks at a School for Non-Violence".
- "Comrade Laski, C.P.U.S.A. (M.-L.)"
  Appeared first in 1967 in The Saturday Evening Post.
- "7000 Romaine, Los Angeles 38"
  Appeared first in 1967 in The Saturday Evening Post under the title "The Howard Hughes Underground".
- "California Dreaming"
  Appeared first in 1967 in The Saturday Evening Post.
- "Marrying Absurd"
  Appeared first in 1967 in The Saturday Evening Post.
- "Slouching Towards Bethlehem"
  Appeared first on September 23, 1967, in The Saturday Evening Post.

=== II. Personals ===
- "On Keeping a Notebook"
  Appeared first in 1966 in Holiday.
- "On Self-Respect"
  Appeared first in 1961 in Vogue under the title "Self-respect: Its Source, Its Power".
- "I Can't Get That Monster out of My Mind"
  Appeared first in 1964 in The American Scholar.
- "On Morality"
  Appeared first in 1965 in The American Scholar under the title "The Insidious Ethic of Conscience".
- "On Going Home"
  Appeared first in 1967 in The Saturday Evening Post.

=== III. Seven Places of the Mind ===
- "Notes from a Native Daughter"
  Appeared first in 1965 in Holiday.
- "Letter from Paradise, 21° 19' N., 157° 52' W"
  Appeared first in 1966 in The Saturday Evening Post under the title "Hawaii: Taps Over Pearl Harbor".
- "Rock of Ages"
  Appeared first in 1967 in The Saturday Evening Post.
- "The Seacoast of Despair"
  Appeared first in 1967 in The Saturday Evening Post.
- "Guaymas, Sonora"
  Appeared first in 1965 in Vogue.
- "Los Angeles Notebook"
  A section entitled "The Santa Ana" appeared first in 1967 in The Saturday Evening Post.
- "Goodbye to All That"
  Appeared first in 1967 in The Saturday Evening Post under the title "Farewell to the Enchanted City".

== Reception ==
The book was immediately favorably received; its popularity continued to grow and it became a "phenomenon" with a devoted readership in subsequent years.

In The New York Times Book Review, novelist and screenwriter Dan Wakefield wrote, "Didion's first collection of nonfiction writing, Slouching Towards Bethlehem, brings together some of the finest magazine pieces published by anyone in this country in recent years. Now that Truman Capote has pronounced that such work may achieve the stature of 'art,' perhaps it is possible for this collection to be recognized as it should be: not as a better or worse example of what some people call 'mere journalism,' but as a rich display of some of the best prose written today in this country."

In 2024, musician and comedian Will Wood referenced Slouching Towards Bethlehem in his musical comedy tour of the same name, which later became a concert film and audio album called "Slouching Towards Branson" in 2025. Additionally, a new audiobook voiced by actress Maya Hawke was released in November 2024.
