= Run, River =

1963 novel by Joan Didion

- First edition
- Author: Joan Didion
- Language: English
- Publisher: Ivan Obolensky
- Publication date: 1963
- Publication place: United States
- Media type: Print (hardcover and paperback)
- Pages: 264
- ISBN: 0-006218792
- OCLC: 312968389

Run River is the debut novel of Joan Didion, first published in 1963.

== Summary ==
The novel is both a portrait of a marriage and a commentary on the history of California. Everett McClellan and his wife, Lily Knight McClellan, are the great-grandchildren of pioneers, and what happens to them (murder and betrayal) is suggested as an epilogue to the pioneer experience.

== Didion on Run River ==
In her 2003 book of essays Where I Was From, Didion turned a critical eye on this novel, calling the novel's nostalgia ''pernicious''. She recalled writing it as a homesick girl lately moved from California to New York, and judged it to be a work of false nostalgia, the construction of an idyllic myth of rural Californian life that she knew never to have existed.

== Original title ==
In a 1978 interview, Didion said that she had intended the title to be Run River but that the English publisher, Jonathan Cape, inserted a comma; "but it wasn't of very much interest to me because I hated it both ways. The working title was In the Night Season", which her American publisher did not like.
