= Dustin Hoffman filmography =

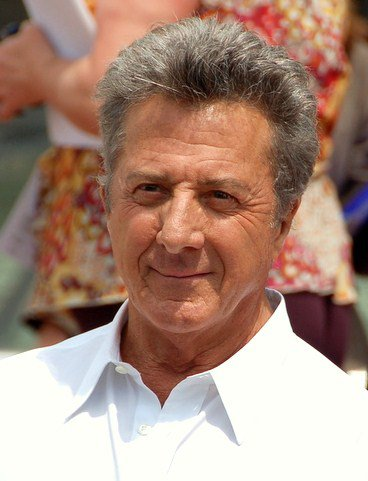
Hoffman at the Cannes Film Festival

American actor Dustin Hoffman began his career by appearing in an episode of Naked City in 1961. His first theatrical performance was 1961's Shmem needs a shink as Ridzinski. Following several guest appearances on television, he starred in the 1966 play Eh?; his performance garnered him both a Theatre World Award and Drama Desk Award. Hoffman made his film debut in 1967 when he appeared in the comedy The Tiger Makes Out. In the same year, his breakthrough role as Benjamin "Ben" Braddock, the title character in Mike Nichols' comedy-drama The Graduate, led to Hoffman achieving star status and his first Academy Award nomination. He then acted in the play Jimmy Shine as the eponymous character and the comedy film Madigan's Millions (both 1968). In 1969, he starred alongside Jon Voight in the Academy Award for Best Picture winner Midnight Cowboy, for which Hoffman was nominated a second time for the Academy Award for Best Actor.

The 1970s saw Hoffman star in several critically acclaimed and commercially successful films, including the Western Little Big Man (1970), psychological thriller Straw Dogs (1971), prison film Papillon (1973) alongside Steve McQueen, Lenny (1974) about the controversial comedian Lenny Bruce, and the political thriller All the President's Men (1976) as journalist Carl Bernstein investigating the Watergate scandal alongside Bob Woodward (played by Robert Redford). After starring in the suspense-thriller Marathon Man (1976) and the crime drama Straight Time (1978), Hoffman starred in the 1979 drama Kramer vs. Kramer, which he won the Academy Award for Best Actor for the first time for his performance as Ted Kramer.

After a three-year acting hiatus, he starred in the comedy Tootsie in 1982 as a struggling actor who pretends to be a woman in order to get an acting role. He returned to stage acting with a 1984 performance as Willy Loman in Death of a Salesman – Hoffman reprised the role a year later in a television film. 1987 saw the release of originally ill-received comedy Ishtar, in which he starred with Warren Beatty; its critical support has since grown. He won his second Academy Award for Best Actor for his portrayal of the autistic savant Ray Babbitt in the 1988 film Rain Man, co-starring Tom Cruise. In 1989, he was nominated for a Tony Award and a Drama Desk Award for playing Shylock in a stage performance of The Merchant of Venice. In the 1990s, he made appearances in such films as Warren Beatty's action comedy adaptation Dick Tracy (1990), Steven Spielberg's Hook (1991) as Captain Hook, guest starred in the 1991 "Lisa's Substitute" episode of The Simpsons, medical disaster Outbreak (1995), legal crime drama Sleepers (1996), thriller Mad City (1997), and the satirical black comedy Wag the Dog (1997) alongside Robert De Niro.

In the 2000s, he played theatrical producer Charles Frohman in Finding Neverland, co-starred in the comedy Meet the Fockers (both 2004) as Bernie Focker, the fantasy thriller Perfume: The Story of a Murderer (2006), and played the title character in the family comedy Mr. Magorium's Wonder Emporium (2007). Hoffman has acted in the Kung Fu Panda franchise since 2008 and reprised his role as Focker in Little Fockers (2010). He starred in the HBO drama series Luck, which was cancelled after one season due to animal safety concerns. He made his directorial debut film Quartet in 2012.

== Film ==
Hoffman in 1968

With Bette Midler on The Bette Midler TV Special (1977)

in Death of a Salesman (1985)

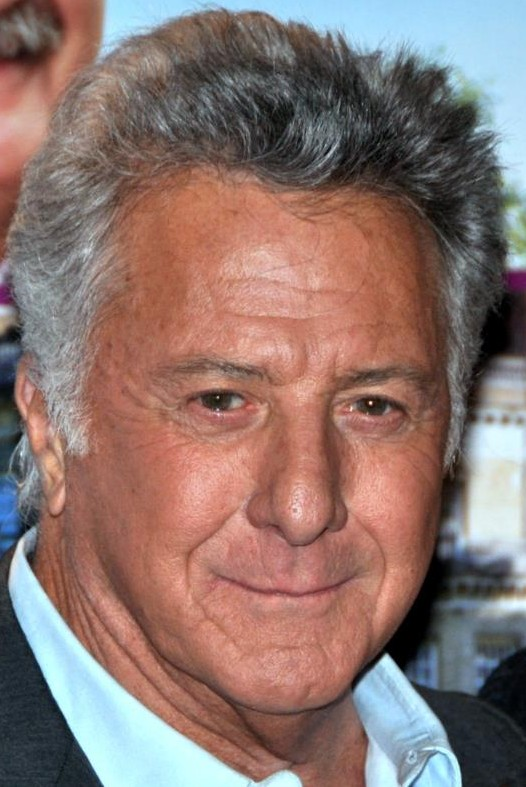
Hoffman in Paris at the French premiere of Quartet, March 2013

Film credits of Dustin Hoffman
Year	Title	Role	Notes	Ref(s)
1967	The Tiger Makes Out	Hap		
1967	The Graduate	Benjamin Braddock		
1968	Madigan's Millions	Jason Fister		
1969	Sunday Father	A Sunday Father	Short film	
1969	Midnight Cowboy	"Ratso" or Enrico Salvatore "Rico" Rizzo		
1969	John and Mary	John		
1970	Little Big Man	Jack Crabb		
1971	Who Is Harry Kellerman and Why Is He Saying Those Terrible Things About Me?	Georgie Soloway		
1971	Straw Dogs	David Sumner		
1972	Alfredo, Alfredo	Alfredo Sbisà		
1973	Papillon	Louis Dega		
1974	Lenny	Lenny Bruce		
1976	All the President's Men	Carl Bernstein		
1976	Marathon Man	Thomas Babington "Babe" Levy		
1978	Straight Time	Max Dembo	Also producer	
1979	Agatha	Wally Stanton		
1979	Kramer vs. Kramer	Ted Kramer		
1982	Tootsie	Michael Dorsey / Dorothy Michaels		
1987	Ishtar	Chuck Clarke		
1988	Rain Man	Raymond Babbitt		
1989	Common Threads: Stories from the Quilt	Narrator	Documentary	
1989	Family Business	Vito McMullen		
1990	Dick Tracy	Mumbles		
1991	Billy Bathgate	Dutch Schultz		
1991	Hook	Captain James Hook		
1992	Hero	Bernie LaPlante		
1995	Outbreak	Colonel Sam Daniels		
1996	Sleepers	Danny Snyder		
1996	American Buffalo	Walt "Teach" Teacher		
1997	Mad City	Max Brackett		
1997	Wag the Dog	Stanley Motss		
1998	Sphere	Dr. Norman Goodman		
1999	A Walk on the Moon	—N/a	Producer only	
1999	The Messenger: The Story of Joan of Arc	The Conscience		
2001	Tuesday	Unknown character	Voice; Short film	
2002	Moonlight Mile	Ben Floss		
2003	Confidence	Winston King		
2003	Runaway Jury	Wendell Rohr		
2004	Finding Neverland	Charles Frohman		
2004	I Heart Huckabees	Bernard Jaffe		
2004	Meet the Fockers	Bernie Focker		
2004	Lemony Snicket's A Series of Unfortunate Events	The Critic	Uncredited cameo	
2005	Racing Stripes	Tucker	Voice	
2005	The Lost City	Meyer Lansky		
2006	Perfume: The Story of a Murderer	Giuseppe Baldini		
2006	Stranger than Fiction	Professor Jules Hilbert		
2006	The Holiday	Himself	Uncredited cameo	
2007	Mr. Magorium's Wonder Emporium	Mr. Edward Magorium		
2008	Kung Fu Panda	Master Shifu	Voice	
2008	Secrets of the Furious Five	Master Shifu	Voice; Short film	
2008	Last Chance Harvey	Harvey Shine		
2008	The Tale of Despereaux	Roscuro	Voice	
2010	Barney's Version	Israel "Izzy" Panofsky		
2010	Jews and Baseball: An American Love Story	Narrator	Voice; Documentary	
2010	Little Fockers	Bernie Focker		
2011	Kung Fu Panda 2	Master Shifu	Voice	
2011	Kung Fu Panda: Secrets of the Masters	Master Shifu	Voice; Short film	
2012	Quartet	—N/a	Directorial debut	
2014	Chef	Riva		
2014	Boychoir	Carvelle		
2014	The Cobbler	Abraham Simkin		
2015	The Program	Bob Hamman		
2016	Kung Fu Panda: Secrets of the Scroll	Master Shifu & Warrior	Voice; Short film	
2016	Kung Fu Panda 3	Master Shifu	Voice	
2017	The Meyerowitz Stories	Harold Meyerowitz		
2019	Into the Labyrinth	Doctor Green		
2022	As They Made Us	Eugene		
2022	Sam & Kate	Bill		
2024	Kung Fu Panda 4	Master Shifu	Voice	
2024	Megalopolis	Nush Berman		
2025	Tuner	Harry Horowitz		
2026	Diamond	Dr. Harry Kleiman		
2026	The Revisionist	David		
TBA	Tower Stories	Jacob	Post-production	

== Television ==
Television credits of Dustin Hoffman
Year	Title	Role	Notes	Ref(s)
1961, 1963	Naked City	Finney / Lester Stenton	2 episodes	
1962, 1965	The Defenders	Buddy / Robert Burke	2 episodes	
1965	The Nurses	Larson	Episode: "The Civil"	
1966	The Journey of the Fifth Horse	Zoditch	Television film; episode of NET Playhouse	
1966	The Star-Wagon	Hanus Wicks	Television film; episode of NET Playhouse	
1967	ABC Stage 67	J.J. Semmons	Episode: "The Trap Old Man"	
1968	Premiere	Arthur Greene	Episode: "Higher and Higher, Attorneys at Law"	
1971	The Point!	Narrator / Father	Voice; Television film	
1985	Death of a Salesman	William "Willy" Loman	Television film	
1990	The Earth Day Special	Everylawyer	Television special	
1991	The Simpsons	Mr. Bergstrom	Voice; Episode: "Lisa's Substitute"; Credited as Sam Etic	
1991	A Wish for Wings That Work	Milquetoast the Cross-Dressing Cockroach	Voice; Television special	
2002–2003	Liberty's Kids	Benedict Arnold	Voice; 4 episodes	
2005	Curb Your Enthusiasm	Larry's Guide #1	Episode: "The End"	
2010	Kung Fu Panda Holiday	Master Shifu	Voice; Television special	
2011–2012	Luck	Chester "Ace" Bernstein	9 episodes; also producer	
2015	Roald Dahl's Esio Trot	Mr Henry Hoppy	Television film	
2016	Medici: Masters of Florence	Giovanni de' Medici	5 episodes	

== Theater ==
Theater credits of Dustin Hoffman
Year	Title	Role	Playwright(s)	Venue	Notes	Ref(s)
1961	A Cook for Mr. General	Ridzinski	Steven Gethers	Playhouse Theatre		
1964	The Subject Was Roses	Timmy Clearly	Frank D. Gilroy	Belasco Theatre	Stage manager and standby	
1966	Journey of the Fifth Horse	Zorlitch	Ronald Ribman	American Place Theatre		
1966	Eh?	Valentine Brose	Henry Livings	Circle in the Square Theatre		
1968	Jimmy Shine	Jimmy Shine	Murray Schisgal	Brooks Atkinson Theatre		
1974	All Over Town		Murray Schisgal	Booth Theatre	Director	
1984	Death of a Salesman	Willy Loman	Arthur Miller	Blackstone Theatre		
1984	Death of a Salesman	Willy Loman	Arthur Miller	Broadhurst Theatre		
1989	The Merchant of Venice	Shylock	William Shakespeare	Phoenix Theatre		
1989	The Merchant of Venice	Shylock	William Shakespeare	46th Street Theatre		

== Music videos ==
Year	Title	Artist(s)
2006	"Follow My Lead"	50 Cent featuring Robin Thicke

== See also ==
- List of awards and nominations received by Dustin Hoffman
