= List of awards and nominations received by Dustin Hoffman =

Dustin Hoffman awards and nominations
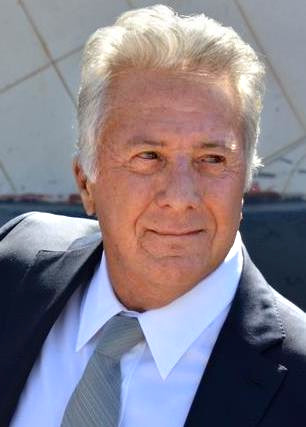
- Hoffman at the Cannes Film Festival in 2017
Awards and nominations
Award	Wins	Nominations
Academy Award	2	7
BAFTA Awards	3	9
Golden Globe Award	6	12
Emmy Awards	2	3
Screen Actors Guild Award	0	2
Tony Awards	0	1

Totals (Note: Certain award groups do not simply award one winner. They acknowledge several different recipients, have runners-up, and have third place. Since this is a specific recognition and is different from losing an award, runner-up mentions are considered wins in this award tally. For simplification and to avoid errors, each award in this list has been presumed to have had a prior nomination.)
- Wins: 32
- Nominations: 257

This article is a List of awards and nominations received by Dustin Hoffman.

Dustin Hoffman is an American actor known for his leading man performances on the stage and screen. In a career spanning over his six decades he received numerous accolades including two Academy Awards, three British Academy Film Awards, six Golden Globe Awards, and two Primetime Emmy Award, as well as nominations for two Screen Actors Guild Awards and a Tony Award.

Hoffman won two Academy Awards for Best Actor for his performances as a father going through a divorce in Kramer vs. Kramer (1979) and as an autistic savant in Rain Man (1988). He was Oscar-nominated for his roles as young man having an affair with an older woman in the coming-of-age film The Graduate (1967), a con man in the drama Midnight Cowboy (1969), comedian Lenny Bruce in biographical film Lenny (1974), an out-of-work actor crossdressing as a female in the comedy Tootsie (1982), and a film producer in the satire Wag the Dog (1997).

For his roles on television, he won two Primetime Emmy Awards including for Primetime Emmy Award for Outstanding Lead Actor in a Limited Series or Movie for his role as Willy Loman in the CBS adaptation of Death of a Salesman (1985). He won the International Emmy Award for Best Actor for Roald Dahl's Esio Trot (2016). He also acted in a leading role in the HBO drama series Luck (2011–2012).

On stage, Hoffman earned a nomination for the Tony Award for Best Actor in a Play for his role as Shylock in the Broadway revival of William Shakespeare play The Merchant of Venice (1990). He won three Drama Desk Awards for his performances as Valentine Brose in Eh? (1967), the title role and struggling artist in Jimmy Shine (1969), and Willy Loman in Death of a Salesman (1984). He made his Broadway debut in the Steven Gethers play A Cook for Mr. General (1961) and acted in Frank D. Gilroy play The Subject Was Roses (1964).

Over his career he has received several honorary awards and prizes including the Berlin International Film Festival's Honorary Golden Bear in 1989, the Venice International Film Festival's Career Golden Lion in 1996, the Golden Globe Cecil B. DeMille Award in 1996, the Britannia Award in 1997, the AFI Life Achievement Award in 1999, the Honorary César in 2009, and the Kennedy Center Honors Award in 2012. He was given a Film Society at Lincoln Center Gala Tribute in 2005 and a Special Presentation Tribute from the Gotham Awards in 2017.

== Major associations ==
=== Academy Awards ===
Year	Category	Nominated work	Result	Ref.
1968	Best Actor	The Graduate	Nominated	
1970	Best Actor	Midnight Cowboy	Nominated	
1975	Best Actor	Lenny	Nominated	
1980	Best Actor	Kramer vs Kramer	Won	
1983	Best Actor	Tootsie	Nominated	
1989	Best Actor	Rain Man	Won	
1998	Best Actor	Wag the Dog	Nominated	

=== BAFTA Awards ===
Year	Category	Nominated work	Result	Ref.
British Academy Film Awards
1969	Most Promising Newcomer	The Graduate	Won	
1970	Best Actor	John and Mary & Midnight Cowboy	Won	
1972	Best Actor	Little Big Man	Nominated	
1976	Best Actor	Lenny	Nominated	
1977	Best Actor	All the President's Men	Nominated	
1977	Best Actor	Marathon Man	Nominated	
1981	Best Actor	Kramer vs. Kramer	Nominated	
1984	Best Actor	Tootsie	Won	
1990	Best Actor	Rain Man	Nominated	
Britannia Awards
1997	Excellence in Film Award		Honored	

=== Emmy Awards ===
Year	Category	Nominated work	Result	Ref.
Primetime Emmy Awards
1986	Outstanding Television Movie	Death of a Salesman	Nominated	
1986	Outstanding Lead Actor in a Limited Series or Movie	Death of a Salesman	Won	
Daytime Emmy Award
2000	Outstanding Children's Special	The Devil's Arithmetic	Nominated	
International Emmy Award
2016	Best Actor	Roald Dahl's Esio Trot	Won	

=== Golden Globe Awards ===
Year	Category	Nominated work	Result	Ref.
1968	Most Promising Newcomer	The Graduate	Won	
1968	Best Actor – Motion Picture Musical or Comedy	The Graduate	Nominated	
1970	Best Actor – Motion Picture Musical or Comedy	John and Mary	Nominated	
1970	Best Actor – Motion Picture Drama	Midnight Cowboy	Nominated	
1975	Best Actor – Motion Picture Drama	Lenny	Nominated	
1977	Best Actor – Motion Picture Drama	Marathon Man	Nominated	
1980	Best Actor – Motion Picture Drama	Kramer vs. Kramer	Won	
1983	Best Actor – Motion Picture Musical or Comedy	Tootsie	Won	
1986	Best Actor – Miniseries or Television Film	Death of a Salesman	Won	
1989	Best Actor – Motion Picture Drama	Rain Man	Won	
1992	Best Actor – Motion Picture Musical or Comedy	Hook	Nominated	
1997	Cecil B. DeMille Award	—N/a	Honored	
1998	Best Actor – Motion Picture Musical or Comedy	Wag the Dog	Nominated	
2009	Best Actor – Motion Picture Musical or Comedy	Last Chance Harvey	Nominated	

=== Screen Actors Guild Award ===
Year	Category	Nominated work	Result	Ref.
1998	Outstanding Actor in a Leading Role	Wag the Dog	Nominated	
2005	Outstanding Cast in a Motion Picture	Finding Neverland	Nominated	

=== Tony Awards ===
Year	Category	Nominated work	Result	Ref.
1990	Best Actor in a Play	Merchant of Venice	Nominated	

== Theatre awards ==
Organizations	Year	Category	Work	Result	Ref.
Drama Desk Awards	1967	Best Performance	Eh?	Won	
Drama Desk Awards	1969	Best Performance	Jimmy Shine	Won	
Drama Desk Awards	1984	Best Actor in a Play	Death of a Salesman	Won	
Drama Desk Awards	1990	Best Featured Actor in a Play	The Merchant of Venice	Nominated	
Theatre World Awards	1967	Performance Award	Eh?	Won	

== Miscellaneous awards ==
Organizations	Year	Category	Work	Result	Ref.
Annie Awards	2009	Outstanding Voice Acting in a Feature Production	Kung Fu Panda	Won	
Boston Society of Film Critics	1982	Best Actor	Tootsie	Won	
Chicago International Film Festival	2012	Best Narrative Feature	Quartet	Won	
Genie Award	2011	Best Supporting Actor	Barney's Version	Won	
Satellite Awards	1997	Best Actor in a Motion Picture Comedy	Wag the Dog	Nominated	
Satellite Awards	2017	Best Supporting Actor	The Meyerowitz Stories	Nominated	
Kansas City Film Critics Circle	1979	Best Actor	Kramer v. Kramer	Won	
Kansas City Film Critics Circle	1988	Best Actor	Rain Man	Won	
Laurel Awards	1968	Male New Face	Himself	Nominated	
Laurel Awards	1968	Male Comedy Performance	The Graduate	4th Place	
Laurel Awards	1970	Male Star	Himself	Nominated	
Laurel Awards	1970	Male, Dramatic Performance	Midnight Cowboy	Won	
Laurel Awards	1971	Male Star	Himself	Won	
Laurel Awards	1971	Male, Comedic Performance	Little Big Man	Nominated	
Los Angeles Film Critics Association	1979	Best Actor	Kramer v. Kramer	Won	
MTV Movie Awards	2004	Best Comedic Performance	Meet the Fockers	Won	
National Society of Film Critics	1979	Best Actor	Kramer v. Kramer	Won	
National Society of Film Critics	1982	Best Actor	Tootsie	Won	
National Society of Film Critics	1988	Best Actor	Rain Man	Nominated	
National Society of Film Critics	1997	Best Actor	Wag the Dog	Nominated	
New York Film Critics' Circle	1969	Best Actor	Midnight Cowboy	Nominated	
New York Film Critics' Circle	1974	Best Actor	Lenny	Nominated	
New York Film Critics' Circle	1979	Best Actor	Kramer v. Kramer	Won	
New York Film Critics' Circle	1982	Best Actor	Tootsie	Nominated	
New York Film Critics' Circle	1988	Best Actor	Rain Man	Nominated	

== Honorary awards ==
Organizations	Year	Award	Result	Ref.
Berlin International Film Festival	1986	Honorary Golden Bear	Honored	
Venice International Film Festival	1996	Career Golden Lion	Honored	
Golden Globe Awards	1996	Cecil B. DeMille Award	Honored	
BAFTA LA Britannia	1997	Excellence in Film Award	Honored	
American Film Institute	1999	AFI Life Achievement Award	Honored	
Empire Awards	2003	Statue	Honored	
Film at Lincoln Center	2005	Gala Tribute	Honored	
César Awards	2009	Honorary César	Honored	
John F. Kennedy Center for the Performing Arts	2012	Kennedy Center Honors	Honored	
Gotham Awards	2017	Tribute	Honored	
Karlovy Vary International Film Festival	2026	Crystal Globe for Outstanding Artistic Contribution to World Cinema	Honored	
