= Office Gossip =

- Genre: Sitcom
- Created by: Paul Mayhew-Archer
- Starring: Pauline Quirke; Robert Daws; Neil Stuke; Pippa Haywood; Daniela Denby-Ashe
- Country of origin: United Kingdom
- No. of series: 1
- No. of episodes: 6

Production
- Executive producer: Sophie Clarke-Jervoise
- Producer: Matthew Francis
- Running time: 30 minutes

Original release
- Network: BBC One
- Release: 2 February – 9 March 2001

Office Gossip is a British sitcom that aired on BBC One in 2001. Starring Pauline Quirke, it was written by Paul Mayhew-Archer, who co-wrote The Vicar of Dibley, and George Pritchett.

Recently, it has been aired in the United States on various PBS stations as part of 'One Season Wonders.

== Cast ==
- Pauline Quirke – Jo Thomas
- Robert Daws – Rod Battle
- Neil Stuke – Simon
- Pippa Haywood – Maxine Wells
- Daniela Denby-Ashe – Cheryl Potts
- Charlotte Francis – Sam Thomas

== Plot ==
Set in the office Tippins Toys Ltd, Office Gossip concentrates on the love lives of Jo Thomas and Simon, who sit opposite each other. Jo is a single mother, her daughter is eleven-year-old Sam, and is the hardworking PA to Rod Battle. Battle, a workaholic whose wife is on the verge of leaving him, confides in Jo and she clearly harbours feelings for him. Meanwhile, Simon is having an affair with his boss, Maxine, a married woman. Both of these relationships, especially Jo and Rod's, become the subject of gossip in the office, often led by Cheryl.

== Episodes ==
Title	Air date	Overview
"Too Close for Comfort"	2 February	Jo learns that Rod's wife has left him, and he invites himself round to dinner, and when Cheryl spots him leaving Jo's office she soon starts the gossip. Also, Maxine tries to make sure her husband doesn't discover her affair with Simon.
"Old Bangers"	9 February	Cheryl finds more reason to gossip when she spots Jo getting out of Rod's car, and Simon's strenuous denials of an affair land him in trouble with Maxine.
"Work Experience"	16 February	The school that Jo's daughter Sam attends has been flooded, so Jo has to bring her to work, which annoys child-hating Maxine. Cheryl thinks that Jo is pregnant by Simon. The staff are trying to figure out why the splatter-gun toy is not selling, and Sam eventually solves the riddle, and exacts revenge on Maxine when the latter takes credit for it.
"Moving On"	23 February	Rod meets a company lawyer who has a personal hygiene problem and when Simon decides to look for another job, Jo wonders whether Rod really appreciates her work.
"The Violin Lesson"	2 March	When Rod is introduced to some European clients, he has to stop saying his opinions about the French, and Jo is annoyed when Rod gives Sam a violin.
"Lucky in Love"	9 March	Jo joins a dating agency, and Rod plucks up the courage to leave his wife. Simon and Maxine have an argument.

== Title song ==
The title song was sung by Daniela Denby-Ashe and Jenna Russell.

== Reception ==
Office Gossip, despite having a good cast and prime time slot of Friday at 9pm on BBC One, did not receive positive reviews and was pulled after only one series. The first episode received 6.6 million viewers, but by the sixth episode only 4.4 million people tuned in.
