= Asthma (film) =

- Directed by: Jake Hoffman
- Written by: Jake Hoffman
- Produced by: Tracey Baird; Noah C. Haeussner; Jake Hoffman; Stephanie Meurer; Missy Papageorge; Krysia Plonka; Orian Williams
- Starring: Benedict Samuel; Krysten Ritter
- Cinematography: David J. Myrick
- Edited by: Barney Pilling
- Music by: Mark Noseworthy
- Production companies: Thank You, Brain! Productions
- Distributed by: IFC Films
- Release dates: July 5, 2014 (Karlovy Vary); October 23, 2015 (United States)
- Running time: 90 minutes
- Country: United States
- Language: English

Asthma is a 2014 American romantic drama film written and directed by Jake Hoffman and starring Benedict Samuel and Krysten Ritter. It is Hoffman's directorial debut.

== Premise ==
Gus is a young rock and roller who steals a white Rolls-Royce and invites a beautiful tattoo artist named Ruby on a joyride out of the city where they smoke and talk about life.

== Cast ==
- Benedict Samuel as Gus
- Krysten Ritter as Ruby
- Nick Nolte as Werewolf (voice)
- Rosanna Arquette as Gus' mother
- Goran Višnjić as Ragen
- Dov Tiefenbach as Logan Backer
- Iggy Pop as local drunk
- Rene Ricard as Juan
- Joey Kern as Bottle Cap
- Gillian Zinser as Kara
- Carlen Altman as Bree
- Annabelle Dexter-Jones as Lilly
- Chelsea Schuchman as Nicole
- Jerry Zucker as Gus' father

== Reception ==
Rotten Tomatoes gives the film an approval rating of 10%, based on 10 reviews, with an average rating of 3.8/10. On Metacritic, the film has a score of 41 out of 100, based on 6 reviews.

Tom Keogh of The Seattle Times wrote that the film "loses its spark and momentum long before the halfway point — a genuine disappointment."

Katie Walsh of the Los Angeles Times wrote that the film "suffers from near-lethal doses of self-satisfied hipness."
