= Esio Trot =

1990 children's novel by Roald Dahl

- First UK edition
- Author: Roald Dahl
- Illustrator: Quentin Blake
- Language: English
- Genre: Children
- Publisher: Jonathan Cape (UK); Viking Press (US)
- Publication date: 3 September 1990
- Publication place: United Kingdom
- Media type: Print (hardback and paperback)
- Pages: 62
- ISBN: 0-224-02786-7
- OCLC: 24734818

Esio Trot is a 1990 children's novel by British author Roald Dahl. The title is an anadrome of "tortoise". It was the last of Dahl's books to be published in his lifetime; he died just two months later.

Unlike other Dahl works (which often feature tyrannical adults and heroic/magical children), Esio Trot is the story of an aging lonely man (Mr. Hoppy), trying to make a connection with a person that he has loved from afar (his widowed neighbour, Mrs. Silver).

In 1994, Monty Python star Michael Palin narrated the English language audiobook recording of the book. In 2015 it was adapted by Richard Curtis into a BBC television film, Roald Dahl's Esio Trot, featuring Dustin Hoffman and Judi Dench as the couple, with James Corden narrating. Geoffrey Palmer later narrated a second English-language recording.

== Plot ==
Mr. Hoppy, a shy bachelor, harbours romantic feelings for his neighbour, the widowed Mrs. Silver. One morning, Silver expresses her wish to make Alfie, her pet tortoise, grow larger. Hoppy gives Silver a "spell" written on a piece of paper and tells her to whisper it in the tortoise's ear. In reality, Hoppy has bought tortoises of varying sizes from pet shops; he builds a special tool to snatch the tortoise from Mrs. Silver's balcony.

Mr. Hoppy continues to switch Mrs. Silver's current pet with larger ones, but she still does not realize that her pet is growing in size, until Mrs. Silver notices that Alfie can no longer fit through the door to his house. Mr. Hoppy summons his courage and asks Mrs. Silver if he can come down and see the effect for himself. Mrs. Silver gladly grants his request. She thanks her friend for the spell, but the tortoise can no longer fit in the house. Hoppy tells her how to "reverse" the spell and they marry.

== 2023 censorship controversy ==
Despite Roald Dahl having enjoined his publishers not to "so much as change a single comma in one of my books", in February 2023 Puffin Books, a division of Penguin Books, announced it would be re-writing portions of many of Dahl's children's novels, changing the language to, in the publisher's words, "ensure that it can continue to be enjoyed by all today." The decision was met with sharp criticism from groups and public figures including authors Salman Rushdie and Christopher Paolini, British prime minister Rishi Sunak, Queen Camilla, Kemi Badenoch, PEN America, and Brian Cox. Dahl's publishers in the United States, France, and the Netherlands announced they had declined to incorporate the changes.

In Esio Trot, more than a dozen changes were made, including removing reference to Mrs Silver being "attractive", changing "I'll be your slave for life" to "You'll be my hero for life" (and similar), and removing reference to a woman changing her surname upon marriage.

Original text	2023 text
Tortoises used to be brought into England by the thousand, packed in crates, and they came mostly from North Africa. But not many years ago a law was passed that made it illegal to bring any tortoises into the country.	Tortoises used to be brought into England by the thousand. They came from lots of different countries, packed in crates. But many years ago a law was passed that made it illegal to bring any tortoises into the UK.

== Film adaptation ==
The book was turned into a BBC One television film of the same name. It features Dustin Hoffman, as Mr Hoppy and Judi Dench as Mrs Silver, with James Corden as the narrator. It was screened on 1 January 2015 and received praise, with The Guardian calling it "a thing of wonder".

== Editions ==
- ISBN 0-670-83451-3 (hardcover, 1990)
- ISBN 0-14-034728-3 (paperback, 1991)
- ISBN 0-14-131133-9
