= Dustin Hoffman =

American actor (born 1937)

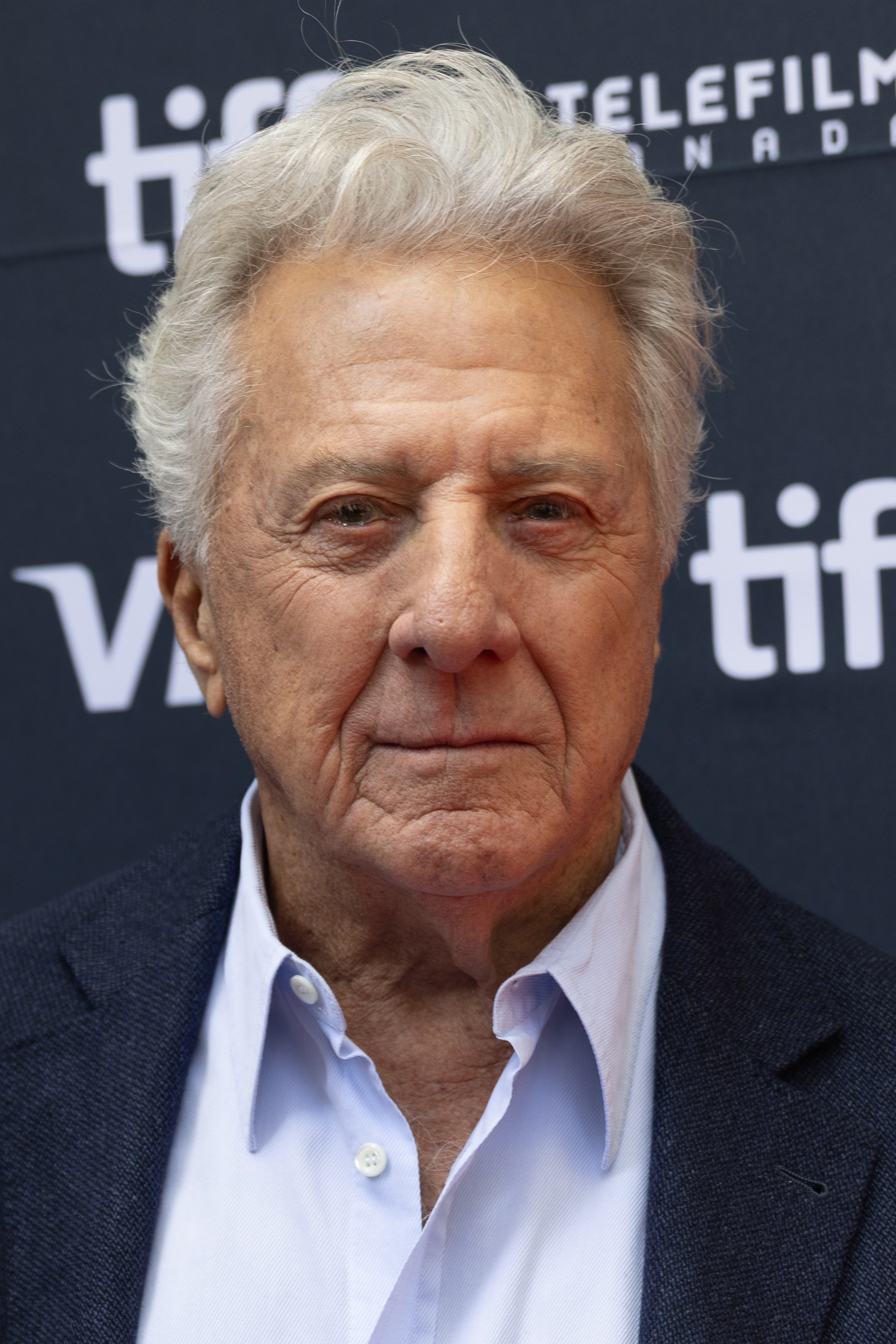
- Hoffman at the TIFF in 2025
- Born: Dustin Lee Hoffman; August 8, 1937 (age 89); Los Angeles, California, U.S.
- Occupation: Actor
- Years active: 1960–present
- Works: Full lists
- Spouses: Anne Byrne (m. 1969; div. 1980); Lisa Gottsegen (m. 1980)
- Children: 6, including Jake
- Awards: Full list
- Dustin Hoffman's voice from the BBC programme Desert Island Discs December 2, 2012

Dustin Lee Hoffman (born August 8, 1937) is an American actor and filmmaker. As one of the key leading man actors in the formation of New Hollywood, Hoffman is known for his versatile portrayals of antiheroes and emotionally vulnerable characters. Throughout his 6 decade career, his numerous accolades include two Academy Awards, four BAFTA Awards, five Golden Globe Awards, and two Emmy Awards as well as a nomination for a Tony Award. He was honored with the Cecil B. DeMille Award in 1997, the AFI Life Achievement Award in 1999, and the Kennedy Center Honors Award in 2012.

Hoffman studied at the Los Angeles Conservatory of Music before he decided to go into acting, for which he trained at the Pasadena Playhouse. He made his film debut acting in The Tiger Makes Out (1967). He went on to receive two Academy Awards for Best Actor for playing a man going through a divorce in Kramer vs. Kramer (1979) and an autistic savant in Rain Man (1988). He was Oscar-nominated for The Graduate (1967), Midnight Cowboy (1969), Lenny (1974), Tootsie (1982), and Wag the Dog (1997). Other notable roles include in Little Big Man (1970), Straw Dogs (1971), Papillon (1973), Marathon Man (1976), All the President's Men (1976), Ishtar (1987), Dick Tracy (1990) and Hook (1991).

In the 21st century, Hoffman mostly transitioned to supporting roles in films such as Runaway Jury (2003), Finding Neverland (2004), I Heart Huckabees (2004), Stranger than Fiction (2006), Meet the Fockers (2004), its sequel Little Fockers (2010), Last Chance Harvey (2008), Chef (2014), The Meyerowitz Stories (2017), Megalopolis (2024), and Tuner (2025). Hoffman also voiced Master Shifu in the Kung Fu Panda film series (2008–present). He made his directorial debut with Quartet in 2012 and released his memoir Look at Me in 2026.

Hoffman made his Broadway debut in the 1961 play A Cook for Mr. General. He subsequently starred as Willy Loman in the 1984 revival of Death of a Salesman and reprised the role a year later in a television film, earning a Primetime Emmy Award for Outstanding Actor in a Limited Series or Movie. In 1989, he received a Tony Award for Best Actor in a Play nomination for his role as Shylock in The Merchant of Venice. He has received three Drama Desk Awards, for his performances in Eh? (1967), Jimmy Shine (1969), and Death of a Salesman (1984), respectively.

== Early life and education ==
Dustin Lee Hoffman was born in Los Angeles, California on August 8, 1937. He is the younger of two sons of Harry Hoffman (1907–1990) and Lillian (née Gold; 1909–1982). His father worked as a prop supervisor (set decorator) at Columbia Pictures before becoming a furniture salesman. Hoffman was named after stage and silent screen actor Dustin Farnum. He has an elder brother Ronald, who is a lawyer and economist. Hoffman is Jewish, from an Ashkenazi Jewish family of immigrants from Belaya Tserkov, Russian Empire (present-day Ukraine) and Iași, Romania. The family's surname was spelled Гойхман (Goikhman) in Russia. His extended family experienced persecution during the Russian Empire and his great grandmother was imprisoned in a concentration camp by the Cheka during the early Soviet period. His upbringing was nonreligious, and he has said, "I don't have any memory of celebrating holidays growing up that were Jewish", and that he had "realized" he was Jewish at around the age of 10.

Hoffman graduated from Los Angeles High School in 1955, which he attended with George Takei and enrolled at Santa Monica College with the intention of studying medicine. But he decided to become an actor, and left in the following year to join the Pasadena Playhouse, although when he told his family about his career goal, his Aunt Pearl warned him, "You can't be an actor. You are not good-looking enough." He also studied with Lee Strasberg and has stated that he did not study with either Sanford Meisner or Stella Adler.

Hoffman initially hoped to become a classical pianist, having studied piano during much of his youth and in college. While at Santa Monica College, he also took an acting class, which he assumed would be an easy grade, and "caught the acting bug". He recalls: "I just was not gifted in music. I did not have an ear." Once his aspirations shifted to acting, he spent the following ten years doing odd jobs, being unemployed, and struggling to get any available acting roles, a lifestyle he was later to portray in the comedy film Tootsie. Hoffman composed a song called "Shooting the Breeze", alongside Bette Midler who wrote the words.

== Career ==
=== 1960–1966: Early theatre roles ===
Hoffman's first acting role was at the Pasadena Playhouse, alongside future Academy Award–winner Gene Hackman. After two years there, Hackman headed for New York City, with Hoffman soon following. Hoffman, Hackman, and Robert Duvall lived together in the 1960s, while all three of them focused on finding acting jobs. Hackman remembers, "The idea that any of us would do well in films simply didn't occur to us. We just wanted to work". Hoffman's appearance—Duvall described him as Barbra Streisand in drag—and small size made him uncastable, Vanity Fair later wrote. During this period, Hoffman got occasional television bit parts, including commercials but, needing income, he briefly left acting in order to teach.

Hoffman studied at the Actors Studio and became a dedicated method actor. In 1960, Hoffman was cast in a role in an off-Broadway production and followed with a bit part in his Broadway debut in production, A Cook for Mr. General (1961). In 1962, he appeared in Rabbit Run Theatre's summer stock production of Write Me a Murder in Madison, Ohio and served as an assistant director to Ulu Grosbard on The Days and Nights of BeeBee Fenstermaker at off-Broadway's Sheridan Square Playhouse. In 1964, Hoffman appeared in Three Men on a Horse at Princeton's McCarter Theatre and in 1965, in off-Broadway's Harry, Noon and Night with Joel Grey. On June 23, 1965, he played Mendy in a practice run of Philip Roth's abandoned off-Broadway play The Nice Jewish Boy, directed by Gene Saks and co-starring Melinda Dillon. Grosbard and Hoffman reunited for a 1965 recording of Death of a Salesman starring Lee J. Cobb and Mildred Dunnock, with Hoffman playing Bernard. He was assistant director for Grosbard's 1965 off-Broadway production of A View from the Bridge starring Robert Duvall and Jon Voight, and in late 1965 stage-managed and appeared in Grosbard's The Subject Was Roses on Broadway. Hoffman's "sharply outlined and vividly colored" performance in off-Broadway's The Journey of the Fifth Horse in April 1966 was followed by another critical success in the play Eh?, by Henry Livings, which had its U.S. premiere at the Circle in the Square Theatre on October 16, 1966. Sidney W. Pink, a producer and 3D-film pioneer, discovered Hoffman in one of his off-Broadway roles and cast him in Madigan's Millions. Through the early and mid-1960s, Hoffman made appearances in television shows and films, including Naked City, The Defenders, and Hallmark Hall of Fame.

Hoffman starred in the 1966 off-Broadway play Eh?, for which he received a Drama Desk Award. He made his film debut in The Tiger Makes Out alongside Eli Wallach in 1967. That same year, immediately after wrapping up principal filming on The Tiger Makes Out, Hoffman travelled from New York City to Fargo, North Dakota, where he directed productions of William Gibson's Two for the Seesaw and William Saroyan's The Time of Your Life for the Fargo-Moorhead Community Theatre. The $1,000 he received for the eight-week contract was all he had to hold him over until the funds from the film materialized.

=== 1967–1969: The Graduate and breakthrough ===
Hoffman in 1968

Director Mike Nichols auditioned Hoffman in 1966 for a lead role in the Broadway musical The Apple Tree but rejected him because he could not sing well enough, and gave Alan Alda the part. However, Nichols was so impressed with Hoffman's overall audition that he cast him as the male lead in the film The Graduate (1967). The role was that of Benjamin Braddock, a recent college graduate who has an affair with Mrs. Robinson, the wife of his father's law partner. It was Hoffman's first major role; he received an Academy Award nomination for it, but lost to Rod Steiger for In the Heat of the Night.

Although David Zeitlin joked in Life magazine that "if Dustin Hoffman's face were his fortune, he'd be committed to a life of poverty", The Graduate was a gigantic box office hit for Embassy Pictures, making Hoffman a major new star at the same time. The film received near-unanimous good reviews. Time magazine called Hoffman "a symbol of youth" who represented "a new breed of actors". The film's screenwriter, Buck Henry, notes that Hoffman's character made conventional good looks no longer necessary on screen, "A whole generation changed its idea of what guys should look like. ... I think Dustin's physical being brought a sort of social and visual change, in the same way people first thought of Bogart. They called him ugly". Hoffman's success amazed friends from his early years as an actor, who told him "You were the last one I expected to make it". Biographer Jeff Lenburg wrote that "newspapers across the country were deluged with thousands of letters from fans", with one example published in The New York Times: "I identified with Ben. ... I thought of him as a spiritual brother. He was confused about his future and about his place in the world, as I am. It's a film one digs, rather than understands intellectually".

Turner Classic Movies critic Rob Nixon notes that Hoffman represented "a new generation of actors". He credits Hoffman with breaking "the mold of the traditional movie star and brought to their roles a new candor, ethnicity, and eagerness to dive deep into complex, even unlikable characters." Nixon expands on the significance of the film to Hoffman's career: "In The Graduate, he created a lasting resonance as Ben Braddock that made him an overnight sensation and set him on the road to becoming one of our biggest stars and most respected actors." Hoffman, however, mostly credits director Mike Nichols for taking a great risk in giving him, a relative unknown, the starring role: "I don't know of another instance of a director at the height of his powers who would take a chance and cast someone like me in that part. It took tremendous courage."

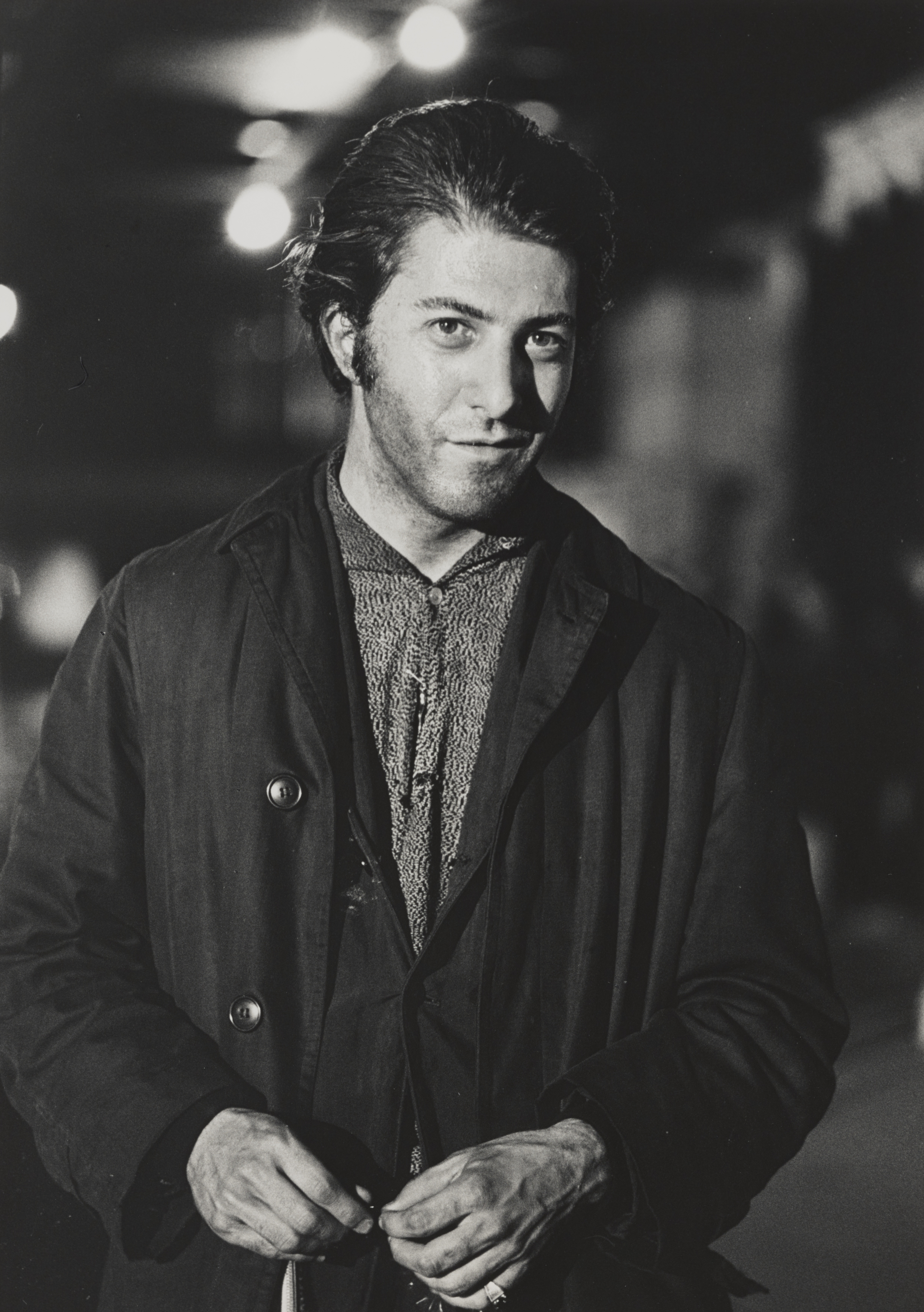
Hoffman on the set of Midnight Cowboy (1969)

Critic Sam Kashner observed strong similarities between Hoffman's character and that of Nichols when he previously acted with Elaine May in the comedy team of Nichols and May. "Just close your eyes and you'll hear a Mike Nichols—Elaine May routine in any number of scenes." Buck Henry also noticed that "Dustin picked up all these Nichols habits, which he used in the character. Those little noises he makes are straight from Mike", he says. After completing The Graduate Hoffman turned down most of the film roles offered to him, preferring to go back to New York and continue performing in live theater. He returned to Broadway to appear in the title role of the musical Jimmy Shine. Hoffman won a Drama Desk Award for Outstanding Performance. "I was a theater person. That's how my friends were, too, Gene Hackman and Bobby Duvall. I wasn't going to be a movie star. I wasn't going to sell out. We wanted to be really good actors. I told them, "I'm going out to make this movie. Don't worry, I'm coming right back."

Hoffman was paid $20,000 for his role in The Graduate, but netted just $4,000 after taxes and living expenses. After spending that money, Hoffman filed for New York State unemployment benefits, receiving $55 per week while living in a two-room apartment in the West Village of Manhattan. He was offered the leading role in Midnight Cowboy (1969), which he accepted partly to prove many critics were wrong about his acting range and the variety of characters he could portray. Peter Biskind wrote, "it was the very contrast between his preppy character in The Graduate, and Ratso Rizzo that appealed to Hoffman. 'I had become troubled,' recalls Hoffman, 'by the reviews that I read of The Graduate, that I was not a character actor, which I like to think of myself as. It hurt me. Some of the stuff in the press was brutal.'" Critics assumed that director Mike Nichols got lucky by finding a typical actor with average acting ability to play the part of Benjamin Braddock.

John Schlesinger, who would direct Midnight Cowboy and was seeking lead actors for it, held that same impression. Hoffman's performance as a button-down college graduate and track star was so convincing to Schlesinger, "he seemed unable to comprehend the fact that he was acting", notes Biskind. To help the director, whom he had never met, overcome that false impression, Hoffman met him in Times Square dressed as a homeless person, wearing a dirty raincoat, his hair slicked back and with an unshaven face. Schlesinger was sold, admitting, "I've only seen you in the context of The Graduate, but you'll do quite well." Midnight Cowboy premiered in theaters across the United States in May 1969. For his acting, Hoffman received his second Oscar nomination and the film won Best Picture. In 1994, Hoffman described the film which was deemed "culturally, historically, or aesthetically significant" by the Library of Congress and selected for preservation in the United States National Film Registry. Biskind considers Hoffman's acting a major accomplishment:

Midnight Cowboy makes us a gift of one of the landmark performances of movie history: Dustin Hoffman's Ratso Rizzo, with Jon Voight's Joe Buck a close second. From a cesspool of dark, foul, even taboo material, ... it rescues a true humanism that need not hide its name.

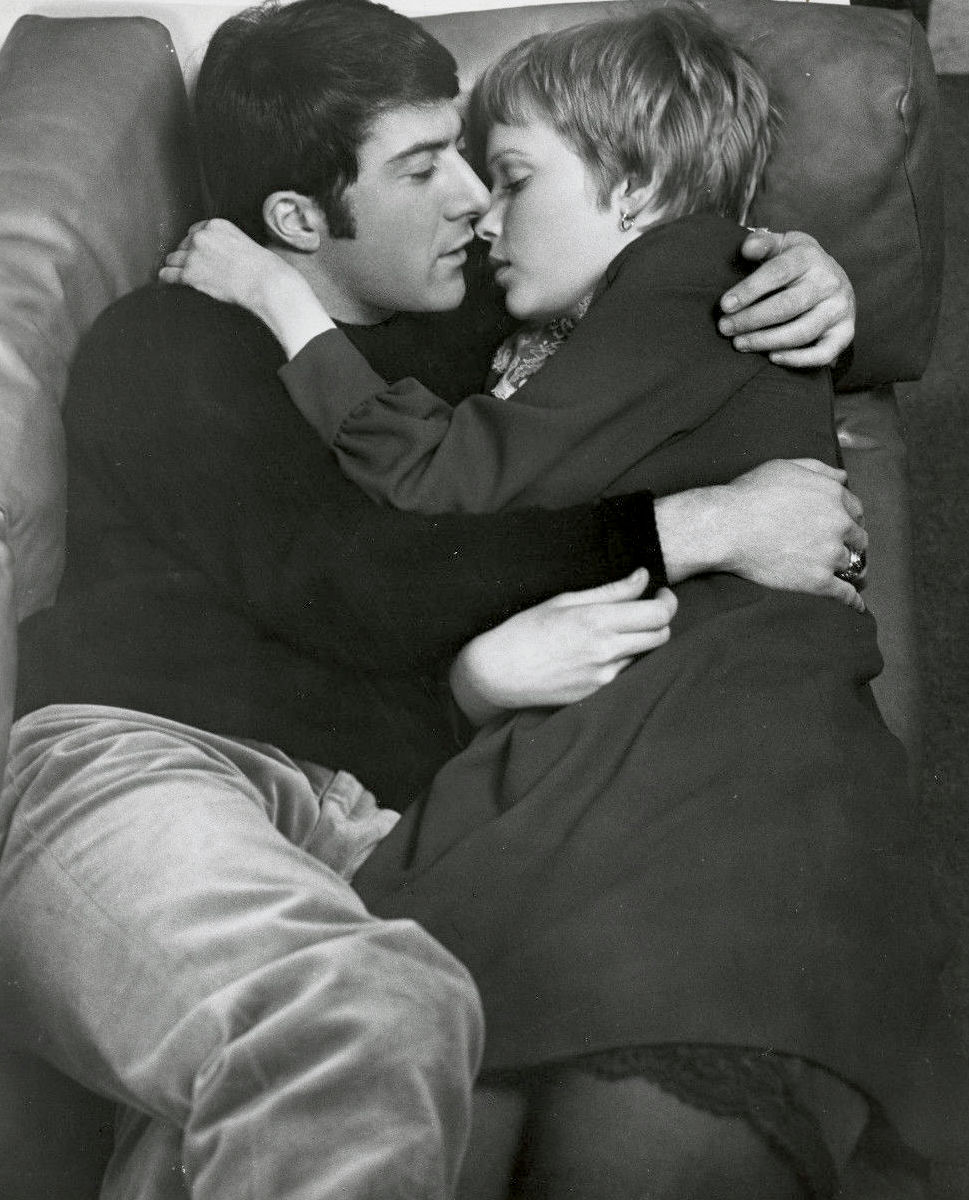
Hoffman with Mia Farrow on the set of John and Mary (1969)

Also in 1969, Hoffman co-starred with Mia Farrow in Peter Yates's romantic drama film John and Mary. He received a 1970 British Academy Film Award for Best Actor for his performance in the film, although the film received mixed reviews. He was also nominated for a Golden Globe Award for Best Actor in a Musical or Comedy Motion Picture. The film was made soon after the success of Farrow's performance in Roman Polanski's Rosemary's Baby (1968), and Hoffman's performance in The Graduate, which prompted their being hailed on the cover of the February 27, 1969 Time magazine as stars of their generation.

=== 1970–1979: Film stardom and acclaim ===
This was followed by his role in Little Big Man (1970), where Jack Crabb, his character, ages from teenager to a 121-year-old man. The film was widely praised by critics, but was largely overlooked for awards except for an Academy Award for Best Supporting Actor nomination for Chief Dan George. Hoffman continued to appear in major films over the next few years, including Who Is Harry Kellerman and Why Is He Saying Those Terrible Things About Me? (1971), Straw Dogs (also 1971), and Papillon (1973). He returned to Broadway in 1974, directing All Over Town. Hoffman next starred in Lenny (1974), for which he was again nominated for Best Actor. Lenny was based on the life of stand-up comedian Lenny Bruce, who died at the age of 40, and was known for his open, free-style and critical form of comedy which integrated politics, religion, sex, and vulgarity. Expectations were high that Hoffman would win an Oscar for his portrayal, especially after his similar role in Midnight Cowboy. Film critic Katharine Lowry speculates that director Bob Fosse "never gave him a chance" to go far enough into developing the character. "We never understand what, besides the drugs he injected, made him tick like a time bomb", she says.

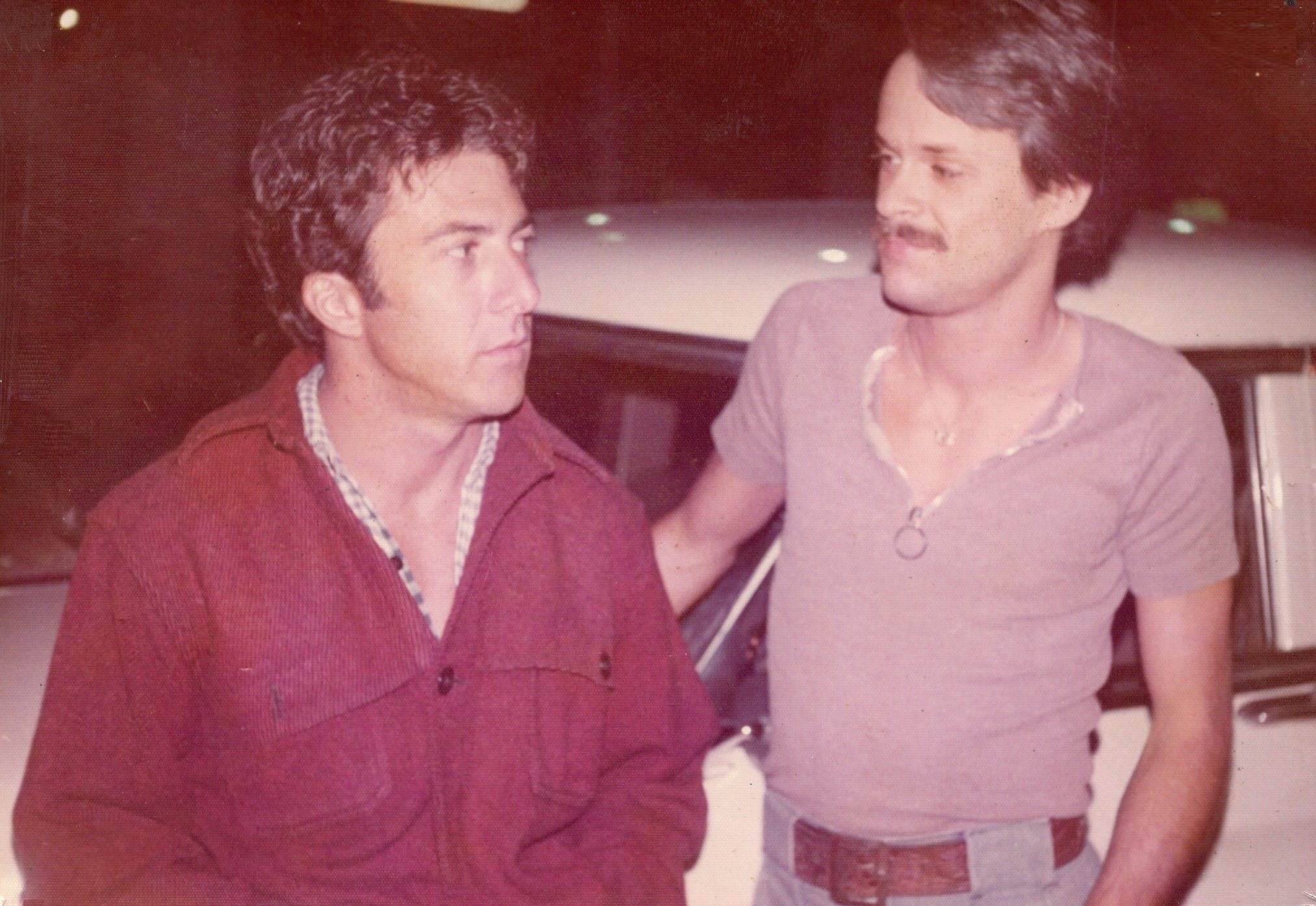
Hoffman (left) on the set of Lenny in 1974

However, notes author Paul Gardner, "directing Lenny, his most ambitious project, exhausted Fosse emotionally and physically. It turned his life inside out", with shooting days often lasting 10 to 12 hours: "The Lenny Bruce project, based on Julian Barry's play, had gone through two studios and three scripts, and was a problem child, like Lenny himself. But Fosse wanted to do it, and he wanted Dustin Hoffman". Hoffman initially turned the part down, saying: "I didn't think the script was strong enough and I wasn't sure I was the one to play the role." While considering the part, he read Lenny Bruce's autobiography and looked at films with Bruce performing stand-up to live audiences. In the same interview with Playboy he recounted: "I began to feel an affinity with him, a realization that there was a lot of Lenny Bruce in me. My wife felt it too ... I realized that I'd have to make use of my own spontaneity because he was so spontaneous. And I admired his guts ... That intimacy is what an actor tries to get ... It occurred to me that if I had known him, I would have wanted us to be friends ... and he was a provocateur, and I love to provoke." Movie critic Judith Crist gave Hoffman credit for the ultimate success of the film:

What is important is that Bruce's routines are so artfully reconstructed, the juice of his creativity so carefully strained, that the claim to genius is justified. And for that Dustin Hoffman deserves full credit, vanishing into the Bruce persona to simply stunning effectiveness,… Hoffman captures the restlessness, the velocity of a man's mouth straining to keep pace with a jet-propelled intelligence…

Lenny was nominated for six Academy Awards, including Best Picture, Best Director, Best Actor, Best Actress, Best Adapted Screenplay, and Best Cinematography.

All the President's Men (1976) was made less than two years after the Watergate scandal, and starred Hoffman and Robert Redford as the real-life journalists, Carl Bernstein and Bob Woodward, respectively. Based on actual events, Hoffman and Redford play Washington Post reporters who uncover a break-in at the Watergate Hotel and end up investigating a political scandal that reaches all the way to the presidency. The film, as earlier ones, had Hoffman take on a dramatically different character than his previous one (as Lenny Bruce), although both men, Bruce and Bernstein, set their faces against abuses of institutional power, and the tendency for society to ignore such abuses. Author James Morrison compares the two roles: "As Lenny Bruce in Lenny (1974), Hoffman plays a martyr to the cause of establishment oppression, while in All the President's Men, he plays a reporter exposing presidential malfeasance."

Vincent Canby of The New York Times described the film as "a spellbinding detective story". "The strength of the movie", he added, was "the virtually day-to-day record of the way Bernstein and Woodward conducted their investigations." The characters portrayed by Hoffman and Redford shared the rank of No. 27 Hero on AFI's 100 Years... 100 Heroes and Villains list, while Entertainment Weekly ranked All the President's Men as one of the 25 "Powerful Political Thrillers".

With Bette Midler on The Bette Midler TV Special (1977)

Hoffman next starred in Marathon Man (1976), a film based on William Goldman's novel of the same name, opposite Laurence Olivier and Roy Scheider. Its director, John Schlesinger also directed Hoffman in Midnight Cowboy in 1969. Described as "Schlesinger's thriller", by author Gene D. Phillips, Hoffman plays the hero, Babe Levy, a part-time long-distance runner and graduate student, who suddenly finds himself being pursued by a fugitive Nazi. To put himself in the mindset of someone under severe emotional distress, Hoffman did not sleep for days at a time and let his body become disheveled and unhealthy. Olivier was alarmed when Hoffman turned up on set for the dental torture scene. Hoffman explained what he had done, and Olivier replied: "My dear boy, have you ever tried simply acting? It's much easier."

Goldman describes his inspiration for the novel: "What if someone close to you was something totally different from what you thought? In the story, Hoffman thinks his brother (Roy Scheider) is a businessman where the reality is that the man is a spy, who has been involved with the Nazi, Szell." However, Hoffman remembers a serious disagreement he had with Goldman, who also wrote the screenplay, about how the story ends:

I was called on, as the character, to fire point-blank at the Laurence Olivier character, Dr. Szell, and kill him in that last scene. And I said that I couldn't do it. Goldman was quite upset about it, because first of all, how dare I? He wrote the book. "Your job isn't to rewrite — your job is to play it as written." ... it got nasty. I said, "Go hire someone else."
I remember Goldman saying: "Why can't you do this? Are you such a Jew?" I said, "No, but I won't play a Jew who cold-bloodedly kills another human being." ... And that's important to me, that I didn't shoot him in the end. Being a Jew is not losing your humanity and not losing your soul.

Hoffman's next roles were also successful. He opted out of directing Straight Time (1978), but starred as a thief. His next film, Michael Apted's Agatha (1979), was with Vanessa Redgrave as Agatha Christie, focusing on the missing eleven days of the author's life. The part of Archie Christie was played by Timothy Dalton, the then partner of Redgrave, and later to star in James Bond films. Dalton's depiction of cold indifference to his wife produced a perfect foil to Hoffman's portrayal of warm compassion, humor and sensitivity. The film had both romantic and comic moments whilst the overall plot cleverly mirrored one of Christie's detective novels. Agatha was generally very well received by critics, especially in the UK, and maintains an 82% rating on Rotten Tomatoes.

Hoffman next starred in Kramer vs. Kramer (1979) opposite Meryl Streep and directed by Robert Benton. The film tells the story of a married couple's divorce and its impact on everyone involved, including the couple's young son. Hoffman won his first Academy Award, and the film also received the Best Picture honor, plus the awards for Best Supporting Actress (Streep), Best Director, and Best Adapted Screenplay. The film required Hoffman to change his attitude, from being a "desensitized advertising art director" into becoming a "responsive and concerned daddy" after his wife (Streep) walks out on him and their six-year-old son, Billy. Hoffman, during the making of the movie, was also going through his own divorce after a ten-year first marriage. Hoffman has said, "Giving myself permission not only to be present but to be a father was a kind of epiphany for me at that time, that I could get to through my work. ... I got closer to being a father by playing a father. That's very painful to say." The role also reminded him of his own love of children in general saying, "Children are more interesting than anything. I walk my younger child to school every day and I don't like leaving the school. I would like to sit down on those little chairs, at those little tables, and play. And a child's love is like a drug. To have a child throw his arms about you—it's instant stoned. People talk about the rush heroin gives you: I would say children give you that rush".

Benton's directing has been praised by Hoffman, who credits him for inspiring the emotional level supporting many scenes: "Perfect directors make you emotional. On Kramer vs. Kramer, Robert Benton made me emotional. He was pulling so hard for me. When I didn't think I could do a scene again I'd say, "I can't give it to you, I haven't got it." Then he'd just get this look on his face and roll the camera and I'd say, "Okay, this is yours." That's what he made you want to do for him—to give him one."

In a tense restaurant scene, he famously shattered his wine glass against the wall without telling Streep beforehand (only informing the cameraman beforehand to keep shooting, so the moment would be captured on film and her reaction would be genuine), sending glass shards into her hair. She confronted him immediately afterward for frightening her so badly.

=== 1980–1989: Career expansion ===
Hoffman in Death of a Salesman (1985)

In Tootsie (1982), Hoffman played Michael Dorsey, a struggling actor who finds himself dressing up as a woman to land a role on a soap opera. His co-star was Jessica Lange. Tootsie earned ten Academy Award nominations, including Hoffman's fifth nomination. Under direction by Sydney Pollack, Hoffman's role demanded "a steady bombardment of opposites—edgy then funny, romantic then realistic, soft then quivering." To film critic David Denby, Hoffman's character "embodies vulnerability and drive in perfect proportion. He has the knack of making everything he does seem perilous, and so audiences feel protective of him and root for him." Hoffman's acting was made more difficult than necessary, however, as he was not given the rehearsal time Pollack promised, "I like to be very prepared, and I feel that the success or failure of a film is many times determined before you start principal photography. I wanted rehearsal very much. I was promised two weeks and was grieved that I didn't get it. We also followed the risky course of starting to shoot with a screenplay that wasn't completed".

Fellow actor Gary Oldman reported that, during a telephone conversation with Hoffman, the latter recalled having made comments toward a "very powerful" industry figure who ensured that he was unable to find work in Hollywood for some time following Tootsie. In 1983, Hoffman became a major donor for The Mirror Theater Ltd, alongside Paul Newman and Al Pacino, matching a grant from Laurance Rockefeller. The men were inspired to invest by their connection with Lee Strasberg, as Strasberg's then daughter-in-law Sabra Jones was the founder and producing artistic director of The Mirror. In 1983, Hoffman signed on to star in The Yellow Jersey, which was to be a bicycle-racing drama set during the Tour de France. Hoffman was passionate about the project, considering several directors, firstly Michael Cimino whom he later fired due to the director's uncompromising way of working. The film's producers, however, failed to find a suitable replacement, so the film was not made.

In 1984, Hoffman starred as Willy Loman in the Broadway revival of Arthur Miller's play Death of a Salesman. He reprised his role in a television film of the same name, for which he won the 1985 Emmy Award for Outstanding Lead Actor along with a Golden Globe. Hoffman first read the play at the age of 16, but today considers the story much like his own: "It was a blueprint of my family. I was the loser, the flunky, and my brother, a high-school varsity football player, was Biff." Author Marie Brenner notes that Hoffman "has been obsessed with the play" throughout his career: "For years he has wanted to be Willy Loman; when he discovered that Arthur Miller was his neighbor in Connecticut, they began to talk about it in earnest." For Hoffman, the story also left a deep emotional impact from the time he first read it, "I read that play, and I was just destroyed by it. It was like finding out something terrible about my family. I just shook. I felt like my family's privacy had been invaded. I couldn't even talk about it for weeks". Hoffman rehearsed for three weeks with the play's original star, Lee J. Cobb, and remembers seeing his stage performance: "I'll never forget that period in my life. It was so vivid, so intense, watching Lee J. Cobb and his sixteen-inch guns as Willy. God, how I think about what I saw on that stage!" Brenner adds that Hoffman "has been training like a boxer for the role that so exhausted Cobb he had to be replaced after four months." The original play was directed by Elia Kazan, who Hoffman considers "the perfect director, the best there ever was. ... God, I would have done anything to have worked with Kazan."

The thing I love about Ishtar – and I love it with all of its flaws – is that it has a statement to make. And that is: It is far, far better to spend a life being second rate in something that you're passionate about, than to spend a life being first-rate at that which you are not passionate about. I thought that was worth making a movie about. These guys want to be Simon & Garfunkel, but they have no talent at all. They're middle-aged guys, and at the end of the movie they wind up singing "That's Amore" at a Holiday Inn in Morocco. It's fair. It's fair to make a movie about that.

— Hoffman on working on Ishtar

Hoffman's worst film failure was Elaine May's Ishtar (1987), co-starring Warren Beatty, who also produced it. Hoffman and Beatty play two down-and-out singer-songwriters who travel to Morocco for a nightclub gig and get caught up in foreign intrigue. Much of the movie was filmed in Africa. The film faced severe production problems, mostly related to its $55 million cost, and received overwhelmingly negative reviews. However, Hoffman and Beatty liked the film's final cut and tried to defend it. Hoffman and Beatty were unaffected by the flop, and Ishtar became a cult film. Quentin Tarantino, for one, has called it one of his favorite movies, partly due to the humorous lyrics of the songs written by Paul Williams.

Next came director Barry Levinson's Rain Man (1988), where Hoffman starred as an autistic savant, alongside Tom Cruise. Levinson, Hoffman, and Cruise worked for two years on the film, and Hoffman's performance gained him his second Academy Award. Behind Hoffman's motivation for doing the film, he has said, "Deep inside, Rain Man is about how autistic we all are." In preparation for the part, Hoffman spent two years befriending autistic people, which included taking them bowling and to fast food restaurants. "It fed my obsession", he has stated. Hoffman worked at the New York Psychiatric Institute, affiliated with Columbia University, when he was 21. "It was a great experience for me", he said. "All my life I had wanted to get inside a prison or a mental hospital. ... I wanted to get inside where behavior, human behavior, was so exposed. All the things the rest of us were feeling and stopping up were coming out of these people." He used that experience to help him develop the character of Raymond Babbitt, a high-functioning autistic savant, yet a person who critic David Denby described as "a strangely shuttered genius". Hoffman created certain character traits for Raymond. Denby noted: "Hoffman, looking suddenly older and smaller, has developed a small shuffling walk for Raymond, with shoulder bent. His eyes don't make contact with anyone else's, and he flattens his voice to a dry nasal bark."

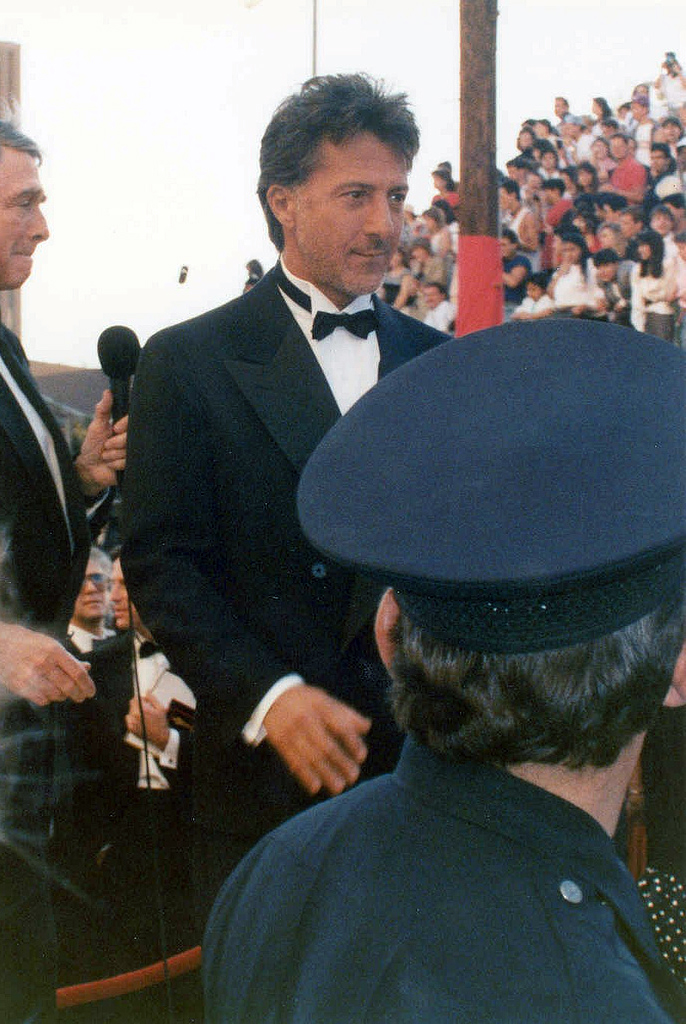
Hoffman at the 61st Academy Awards, 1989

Rain Man won four Academy Awards, including Best Picture, Best Actor for Hoffman, and Best Director for Barry Levinson. Having worked closely with Hoffman for two years on filming, Levinson offered some opinions about his skill as an actor:

You can't define Dustin Hoffman, because he's unique. He's one of a kind and he's not one character. There is no Dustin Hoffman. He is many, many people. ... He can do comedy and he can do drama. He has an enormous range, and yet he's still Dustin somewhere in there. He's intelligent and has a great sense of how to connect with people, because he's very interesting. On a day-to-day basis, he's like an actor who's making his first movie, with the enthusiasm and energy to want to make things happen and try things and experiment.

After Rain Man, Hoffman starred with Sean Connery and Matthew Broderick in Family Business (1989), directed by Sidney Lumet. The film centers on the estrangement between Vito (Hoffman), a middle-aged man trying to succeed in a legitimate business, and his "hopelessly corrupt but charming father", Jesse (Connery). Critics were mostly not impressed with the story, although the individual performances were praised, especially Connery's.

Because of their different acting styles and nationalities, some industry writers thought Connery and Hoffman might not work well together as close family members. "To the surprise of many", note Connery biographers Lee Pfeiffer and Lisa Philip, "the two superstars developed an immediate rapport and chemistry that translates onto the screen." And Lumet remembered: "Sean is extremely disciplined and Dustin is very improvisational, all over the place with his lines. I didn't know where it would end up, but Sean met Dustin improvisation for improvisation, and a great deal of richness and humor came out of it." In 1989, Hoffman played Shylock in Peter Hall's production of Shakespeare's The Merchant of Venice at the Phoenix Theatre in London, transferring to New York the following year.

=== 1990–2009: Established actor ===
In 1991, Hoffman voiced substitute teacher Mr. Bergstrom in The Simpsons episode "Lisa's Substitute". He was credited under the pseudonym Sam Etic, a play on "Semitic". Throughout the 1990s, Hoffman appeared in many large, studio films, such as Dick Tracy (1990) (where his Ishtar co-star Beatty played the titular character), Hero (1992) and Billy Bathgate (1991) co-starring with Nicole Kidman (who was nominated for a Golden Globe). Hoffman also played the title role of Captain Hook in Steven Spielberg's Hook (also 1991), earning a Golden Globe nomination, and the narrator in Dr. Seuss Video Classics: Horton Hears a Who! (also 1992); in Hook, Hoffman's costume was so heavy that he had to wear an air-conditioned suit under it. Hoffman played the lead role in Outbreak (1995), alongside Rene Russo, Kevin Spacey, Morgan Freeman, Cuba Gooding Jr., and Donald Sutherland. In the film, Hoffman is a medical doctor, serving as a Colonel in the U.S. Army Medical Corps., working at the United States Army Medical Research Institute of Infectious Diseases (USAMRIID), who uncovers a newly discovered Ebola-like virus which came to the U.S. from Africa in an infected monkey. Hoffman races to stop the virus's spread and find a vaccine before it becomes a worldwide pandemic without a cure. It was one of the films that was produced by his production banner, Punch Productions. The film is described by critic Roger Ebert as "one of the great scare stories of our time, the notion that deep in the uncharted rain forests, deadly diseases are lurking, and if they ever escape their jungle homes and enter the human bloodstream, there will be a new plague the likes of which we have never seen." Critic David Denby credits Hoffman with giving the movie much of its thriller-like quality:

Tanks and men pour in to herd the terrified population here and there, and Dustin Hoffman, as the supersleuth Army doctor, gives such a lip-biting, anguished performance he absolves the movie of slickness. Hoffman isn't good, exactly; he's tense, edgy, and righteous, like a B-movie actor from the fifties.

Following that, he appeared in the 1996 revenge drama/legal thriller Sleepers (1996) with Robert De Niro, Brad Pitt, Jason Patric, and Kevin Bacon. In the mid-1990s, Hoffman starred in—and was deeply involved in the production of—David Mamet's American Buffalo (also 1996), and an early effort of film editor Kate Sanford. In 1997, Hoffman starred opposite John Travolta in the Costa Gavras film Mad City. Hoffman gained his seventh Academy Award nomination for his performance in Wag the Dog (1997), in a role that allowed Hoffman the chance to work with both De Niro and Denis Leary. The black comedy film was produced and directed by Barry Levinson, who previously worked with Hoffman for the Rain Man. The story takes place a few days before a presidential election, where a Washington, D.C. spin doctor (De Niro) distracts the electorate from a sex scandal by hiring a Hollywood film producer (Hoffman) to construct a fake war with Albania. Hoffman, as a caricature of real life producer Robert Evans, according to some, "gives the kind of wonderfully funny performance that is liable to win prizes, especially since its mixture of affection and murderous parody is so precise. Stanley (Hoffman) conducts business meetings in tennis clothes or in robe and slippers", notes critic Janet Maslin.

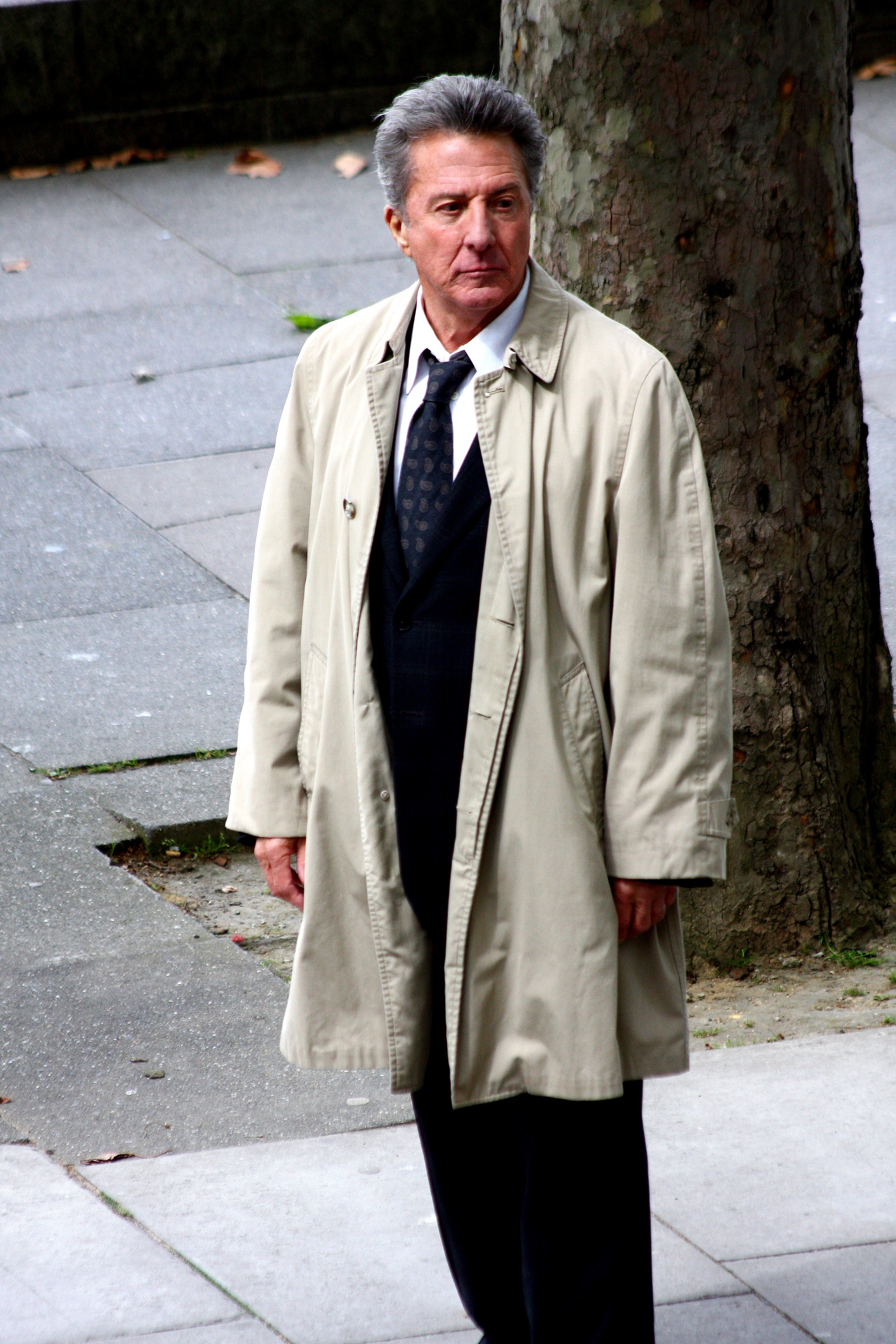
Hoffman during the filming of Last Chance Harvey in 2008

Hoffman next appeared in Levinson's next film, the science fiction psychological thriller, Sphere (1998), opposite Sharon Stone. In 1999, Hoffman received the AFI Life Achievement Award and recalls the emotional impact that receiving the award had on him, "There was this reel of pictures, me playing all these different roles. I had my first—and only, thank God—panic attack. What followed was depression. ... It had to do with a central core in me, which was that I never felt I deserved success". Hoffman next appeared in Moonlight Mile (2002), followed by Confidence (2003) opposite Edward Burns, Andy García, and Rachel Weisz. Hoffman finally had a chance to work with Gene Hackman in Gary Fleder's Runaway Jury (also 2003), an adaptation of John Grisham's bestselling novel. Hoffman played theater owner Charles Frohman in the J. M. Barrie historical fantasia Finding Neverland (2004), co-starring Johnny Depp and Kate Winslet. In director David O. Russell's I Heart Huckabees (also 2004), Hoffman appeared opposite Lily Tomlin as an existential detective team member. In 2001, his Punch Productions company went to a first look deal with The Walt Disney Studios.

Seven years after his nomination for Wag the Dog, Hoffman starred again with De Niro, co-starring with Streisand and Ben Stiller in the 2004 comedy Meet the Fockers, a sequel to Meet the Parents (2000). Hoffman won the 2005 MTV Movie Award for Best Comedic Performance. In 2005, he voiced a horse in Racing Stripes, and appeared in cameo roles in Andy García's The Lost City and on the final episode of HBO sitcom Curb Your Enthusiasm's fifth season. Hoffman appeared in Stranger than Fiction (2006) and played the perfumer Giuseppe Baldini in Tom Tykwer's film Perfume: The Story of a Murderer (also 2006).

In 2007, Hoffman was featured in an advertising campaign for Australian telecommunications company Telstra's Next G network, appeared in the 50 Cent video "Follow My Lead" as a psychiatrist, and played the title character in the British family film Mr. Magorium's Wonder Emporium for which he was nominated for a BIFA for Best Performance by an Actor in a British Independent Film at the British Independent Film Awards 2007. In 2008, although he was reluctant to perform in an animated feature film (despite previously performing voices in a version of The Point! and in an episode of The Simpsons), Hoffman had a prominent role as Shifu in the film Kung Fu Panda, which was praised in part for his comedic chemistry with Jack Black (whom he tutored in acting for an important scene) and his character's poignantly complex relationship with the story's villain. He later won the Annie Award for Voice Acting in an Animated Feature for his performance and has continued into the role in the franchise's subsequent filmed productions outside of the franchise's television series. He next voiced Roscuro in The Tale of Despereaux.

As the title character in Last Chance Harvey, Hoffman acted with co-star Emma Thompson in the story of two lonely people who tentatively forge a relationship over the course of three days. Director Joel Hopkins notes that Hoffman was a perfectionist and self-critical: "He often wanted to try things stripped down, because less is sometimes more. He worries about every little detail."

=== 2010–present ===
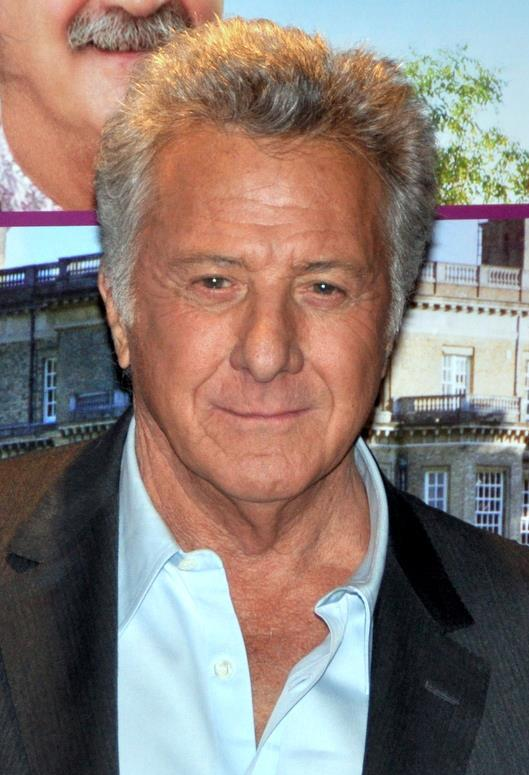
Hoffman in 2013

He appeared in Little Fockers, the critically panned yet financially successful 2010 sequel to Meet the Fockers. However, his character plays a significantly smaller role than in the previous installment. In 2011, Hoffman reprised his role as Master Shifu in the commercially and critically successful animated film Kung Fu Panda 2. In 2012, Hoffman's audiobook recording of Jerzy Kosinski's Being There was released at Audible.com. Hoffman starred in the HBO horse racing drama Luck, as a man involved in bookmaking and casino operations. The series was canceled in March 2012 after one season following the death of three horses on set.

In 2012, Hoffman made his directorial debut with Quartet, starring Maggie Smith, Tom Courtenay, Pauline Collins, Billy Connolly, and Michael Gambon. The BBC comedy-drama premiered at the 2012 Toronto Film Festival where it earned respectable reviews from critics. Smith was nominated for Golden Globe for her performance. In 2015, Hoffman starred in Roald Dahl's Esio Trot, a BBC television film adaptation of Roald Dahl's classic novel, adapted by Richard Curtis, and co-starring Judi Dench. Hoffman received an Emmy Award for Best Performance by an Actor. In 2016, he reprised his role as Master Shifu in the animated sequel Kung Fu Panda 3.

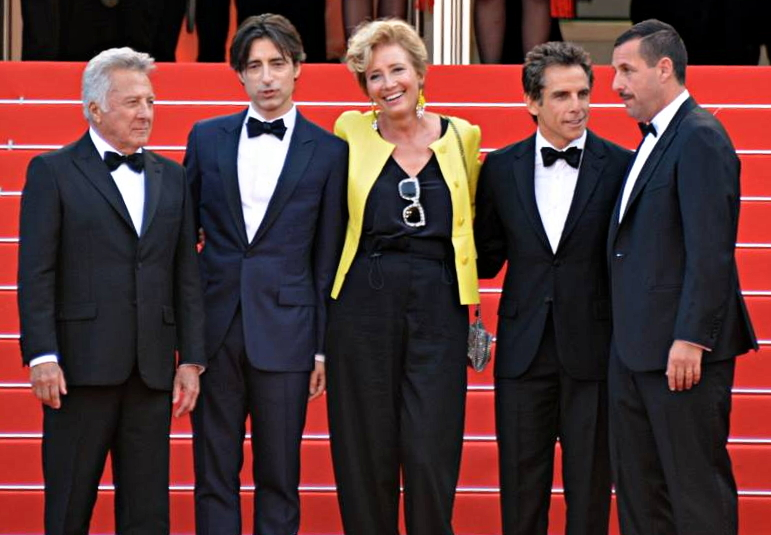
Hoffman, Noah Baumbach, Emma Thompson, Ben Stiller, and Adam Sandler at the Cannes Film Festival screening of The Meyerowitz Stories in 2017

In 2017, Hoffman starred in Noah Baumbach's Netflix film The Meyerowitz Stories alongside Adam Sandler, Ben Stiller, Elizabeth Marvel, and Emma Thompson. The film premiered at the Cannes Film Festival on May 21, 2017, where it received a four-minute standing ovation. In 2017, Hoffman was honored with the Gotham Awards Tribute alongside Sofia Coppola, Nicole Kidman, and Edward Lachman. Hoffman was introduced by Elizabeth Marvel.

In 2020, it was announced that Hoffman would make his return to the Broadway stage in Scott Rudin's revival of Our Town as the Stage Manager. Hoffman's last appearance on stage was 30 years prior in The Merchant of Venice in 1989. Due to the COVID-19 pandemic, Broadway theaters remained shut until 2021 and the production was unrealized. Hoffman appeared alongside Candice Bergen, Dianna Agron, and Simon Helberg in As They Made Us directed by Mayim Bialik. He also starred alongside Sissy Spacek and his son Jake Hoffman in Darren Le Gallo's directorial film debut Sam & Kate which began filming in February 2022. In September 2021, he was attached to feature comedy film Mr. Shaw Goes To Hollywood as MGM studio head, Louis B Mayer. Filming would tentatively commence fall 2021.

In October 2022, Hoffman was cast in Francis Ford Coppola's latest film, a dystopian science fiction epic Megalopolis after James Caan, who was originally cast, died in July. The film reunited Hoffman with his Midnight Cowboy costar Jon Voight. The film premiered at the 2024 Cannes Film Festival. Hoffman is attached to Peter Greenaway's upcoming film Tower Stories, which has started filming in the Tuscan city of Lucca. Hoffman's most recent performance was in the film Tuner in 2025.

Hoffman’s memoir Look at Me, published by Simon & Schuster, is scheduled for release in November 2026. He worked on the book with The New Yorker journalist Ariel Levy.

== Legacy and reputation ==
David Thomson of The Guardian described Hoffman as "a central figure of the late 60s, 70s and 80s" adding, "He is a part of what has turned out a very ambiguous vintage: it also includes Jack Nicholson, Robert Redford, Warren Beatty and Woody Allen, actors who cannot quite make up their minds whether they are adorable still or national treasures."

In 2017, the Gotham Awards announced that they would recognize Hoffman for his lifetime achievement in film. The director of the Independent Filmmaker Project (IFP) and Made in NY Media Center stated, "We are thrilled to present Dustin Hoffman with the Actor Tribute. Starting with his breakthrough role in the timeless classic The Graduate to his highly praised turn in his upcoming film, The Meyerowitz Stories, Dustin's wide range of roles – often portraying antiheroes or the marginalized – and the creative choices he has embodied in these complex characters, has firmly placed him amongst the most compelling actors to have graced the screen." Actress Elizabeth Marvel introduced Hoffman where she talked about the influence he has had over her career and stated, "His work is never anything less than extraordinary".

== Acting credits and accolades ==
In 1999, Hoffman was honored by the American Film Institute, who celebrated him with the 27th Life Achievement Award. Those who praised him and celebrated his work included Edward Norton, Jon Voight, Goldie Hawn, Cuba Gooding Jr., and Kathy Bates. Jack Nicholson presented Hoffman with the award. Upon receiving the award he quoted the poet Emily Dickinson, "Not knowing when the dawn will come, I open the door".

In 2009, Hoffman received an Honorary Cesar Medal at the César Awards. In 2012, Dustin Hoffman received a Kennedy Center Honor, with the following commendation: "Dustin Hoffman's unyielding commitment to the wide variety of roles he plays has made him one of the most versatile and iconoclastic actors of this or any other generation". Those who honored him at the ceremony included Robert De Niro, Liev Schreiber, Naomi Watts, and Billy Connolly.

== Personal life ==
=== Marriage and relationships ===
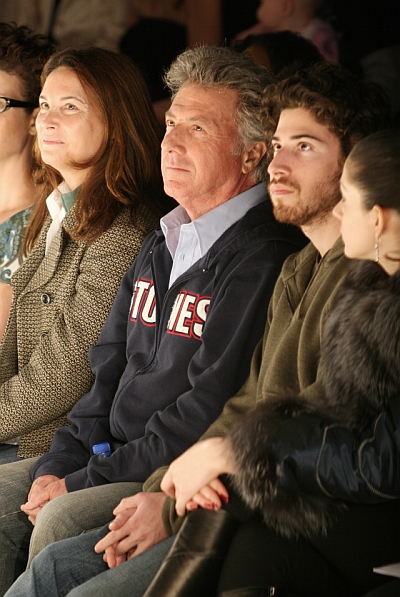
Hoffman (center) with his wife Lisa and son Jake in 2007

After meeting her in 1963, Hoffman married Anne Byrne in May 1969. He adopted Karina (born 1967), Byrne's child from a previous marriage, and with Byrne had daughter Jenna (born October 15, 1969). In 1970, Hoffman and Byrne were living in Greenwich Village in a building next door to a townhouse occupied at the time by members of the Weathermen, when a bomb was accidentally detonated in the townhouse's basement, killing three. In the 2002 documentary The Weather Underground, Hoffman can be seen standing in the street during the aftermath of the explosion. The couple divorced in 1980.

After Hoffman's separation and divorce, he began seeing Lisa Gottsegen, their families having had a relationship together growing up. She was finishing her Juris Doctor degree, and the couple married on October 12, 1980. They have four children: Jacob Edward (born 1981), Rebecca Lillian (born 1983), Maxwell Geoffrey (born 1984) and Alexandra Lydia "Ali" (born 1987). They live in Brentwood, Los Angeles and have a property in Malibu, California.

In an interview, he said that all of his children from his second marriage had bar or bat mitzvahs. Regarding his own spirituality, he has stated he is a more observant Jew now than when he was younger. He has also lamented that he is not fluent in Hebrew.

=== Activism ===
Hoffman has long supported the Democratic Party and Ralph Nader. In 1997 he was one of a number of Hollywood stars and executives to sign an open letter to the German chancellor Helmut Kohl protesting against the treatment of Scientologists in Germany, which was published as a newspaper advertisement in the International Herald Tribune.

=== Cancer treatment ===
Hoffman was successfully treated for cancer in 2013.

=== Sexual misconduct allegations ===
In 2017, seven women accused Hoffman of sexual misconduct or assault. Anna Graham Hunter alleged that, while she was 17 and working as an intern on a TV production of Death of a Salesman, Hoffman made inappropriate jokes and comments around her and asked her to give him foot massages. Hoffman released an apology to Hunter, saying "I have the utmost respect for women and feel terrible that anything I might have done could have put her in an uncomfortable situation", continuing, "I am sorry. It is not reflective of who I am."

In December 2017, comedian John Oliver unexpectedly questioned Hoffman about the allegations during the 20th anniversary screening of Wag the Dog at the 92nd Street Y. "It's 'not reflective of who I am' – it's that kind of response to this stuff that pisses me off," Oliver said. "Do you understand how that feels like a dismissal?" Hoffman said he felt blindsided by the line of questioning, remarking "You've made the case better than anyone else can. I'm guilty. Because someone has alleged something, I'm guilty. You push a button. It's all over the world: I'm a predator. I'm this and that, and it's not true." Hoffman did not publicly respond to the other six allegations at the time.

Online magazine Slate reported in 2017 that Meryl Streep had differences with Hoffman which include his slapping her in a scene and groping her breast. However, a representative for Streep responded to Slate saying it was not an accurate rendering of their 1979 meeting. Streep's representative stated "there was an offense and it is something for which Dustin apologized. And Meryl accepted that."

Bill Murray, who costarred with Hoffman in Tootsie (1982) and The Lost City (2005), defended him, saying, "I heard what happened to him, and Dustin Hoffman is a really decent person. He's crazy, a Borscht Belt flirt, has been his whole life. (But) he's a really sweet man." Actors Chevy Chase and Liam Neeson also came to his defense.

In his 2026 book Look at Me, Hoffman wrote, "I’m sure it’s true that in my life, especially forty years ago, I made some women uncomfortable" but continued to deny any sexual misconduct allegations made against him. In their review of his memoir, The New York Times wrote, "Hoffman got caught up in the big #MeToo sweep of 2017, with several women accusing him of very specific acts of sexual misconduct in the 1980s, including exposing himself to a minor...The actor equivocates about all this. He meanders from a discussion of the violent and misogynistic Sam Peckinpah movie Straw Dogs to the 'demoralizing' beauty rituals he underwent to transform into Dorothy Michaels in Tootsie, to the bawdy sense of humor he shares with Lenny Bruce."

== See also ==
- List of actors with Academy Award nominations
- List of actors with more than one Academy Award nomination in the acting categories
- List of actors with two or more Academy Awards in acting categories
- List of Jewish Academy Award winners and nominees
- List of International Emmy Award winners
- List of Primetime Emmy Award winners
- List of Golden Globe winners
