= Work Is a Four-Letter Word =

1968 British film by Peter Hall

- Film poster
- Directed by: Peter Hall
- Written by: Jeremy Brooks
- Based on: Eh? by Henry Livings
- Produced by: Thomas Clyde
- Starring: David Warner; Cilla Black; Zia Mohyeddin; David Waller; Elizabeth Spriggs
- Cinematography: Gilbert Taylor
- Edited by: Jack Harris
- Music by: Guy Woolfenden; Delia Derbyshire
- Production company: Cavalcade Films
- Distributed by: Rank Film Distributors; Universal Pictures (United States)
- Release dates: June 7, 1968 (London); September 25, 1968 (United States)
- Running time: 93 minutes
- Country: United Kingdom
- Language: English
- Budget: $800,000

Work Is a Four-Letter Word (also known as Work Is a 4-Letter Word) is a 1968 British satirical comedy film directed by Peter Hall and starring David Warner and Cilla Black. It was written by Jeremy Brooks based on the 1966 award-winning play Eh? by Henry Livings.

== Plot ==
Everyone is employed by the ultra-modern DICE Corporation but Valentine Brose would rather stay at home to tend his psychedelic mushrooms. However, his bedroom is too small and his fiancée Betty Dorrick wants him to settle down. Accordingly, Brose seeks a job in DICE's boiler-room, a suitable environment to grow his mushrooms.

The plot describes his attempts to get the job, and the conflicts with middle-management, including the personnel manager, Mrs Murray. Having obtained it, Brose is more interested in his mushrooms than tending the boiler, with unforeseen results including a major power cut. The boiler room contains a computer, which towards the end of the film is also breaking down.

Brose eventually marries Betty, but is more interested in having her sweep up the boiler room so he can concentrate on his first love, the mushrooms. Eventually he goes haywire and the film ends with Brose and Betty loading up a pram with mushrooms and escaping.

== Cast ==
- David Warner as Valentine Brose
- Cilla Black as Betty Dorrick
- Zia Mohyeddin as Dr. Aly Narayana
- David Waller as Mr. Price
- Elizabeth Spriggs as Mrs. Murray
- Alan Howard as Reverend Mort
- Jan Holden as Mrs. Price
- Tony Church as Mr. Arkwright
- Joe Gladwin as Pa Brose
- Julie May as Mrs. Dorrick
- Derek Royle as Briggs
- John Steiner as Anthony
- Cyril Cross as commissionaire
- Clifford Rose as Registry Office clerk
- Paul Dawkins as powerplant guard
- Tommy Godfrey as Mr. Thacker

== Production ==
David Warner had established a reputation for playing off-beat roles, including the title role in Morgan: A Suitable Case For Treatment (1966) and was a member of the Royal Shakespeare Company, of which Peter Hall was artistic director until the year of the film's release. Most of the remainder of the cast were also members of the RSC.

Cilla Black had not previously had a starring role; she had appeared briefly as herself in Ferry Cross The Mersey (1965). She recorded the title song for the film, which was released as the B side of "Where Is Tomorrow?" in 1968; the single reached number 39 in the UK Charts. This would be Black's only starring role in film.

The film was shot at an office building at Birmingham 5 Ways, seen in the opening credits, and at Belvedere Power Station (demolished 1993–1994). Interiors were completed at Shepperton Studios near London.

== Reception ==
The Monthly Film Bulletin wrote: "Somewhere in the shift from stage to film, Henry Livings' play has lost its delicate and primarily verbal anarchy. Its fantasy factory, here endowed with a solid and convincing presence, no longer belongs to the world of surrealism so much as to that of social satire. ... Of course, Val's lonely war against push-button gadgetry evokes comparisons with René Clair and Jacques Tati; but they are comparisons that Peter Hall's first film, with its tedious comic routines and flashy mixture of styles, is unable to sustain."

Variety compared the film thematically with Charlie Chaplin's Modern Times but was critical of its "irritating air of improvisation" and described the storyline as "thin", albeit praising some of the off-beat situations as "very funny".

Leslie Halliwell, in his Film Guide, described it as a "weakly futuristic industrial fantasy which the author would probably claim to be about lack of communication. Bored audiences might have a similar view".

== Cultural references ==
English indie rock band the Smiths covered the film's title song for the B-side of their 1987 single "Girlfriend in a Coma". Smiths guitarist Johnny Marr has stated in interviews that one of the main impetuses for his leaving the band was singer Morrissey's insistence on covering the song. In a 1992 issue of Record Collector, Marr stated, "'Work Is a Four Letter Word' I hated. That was the last straw, really. I didn't form a group to perform Cilla Black songs. That was it, really. I made a decision that I was going to get away on holiday. The only place I could think of was L.A. L.A. was the only place I knew where there'd be sunshine, so off I went. I never saw Morrissey again."

== Home media ==
The film has never been released on home media.
