= Jake Hoffman (actor) =

American actor (born 1981)

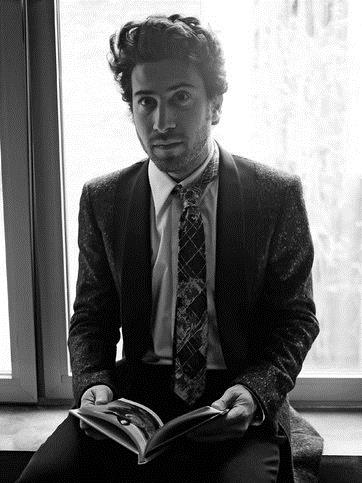
- Hoffman in 2015
- Born: Jacob Edward Hoffman; March 20, 1981 (age 45); Los Angeles County, California, U.S.
- Occupation: Actor
- Years active: 1988–present
- Spouse: Amit Dishon
- Children: 1
- Parents: Dustin Hoffman (father); Lisa Hoffman (mother)

Jacob Edward Hoffman (born March 20, 1981) is an American actor. He is the son of actor Dustin Hoffman and businesswoman Lisa Hoffman.

== Career ==
Hoffman has directed music videos and has written and directed short films, but is best known for his work as an actor. In 2006, he played the adult version of Adam Sandler's son Ben Newman in the comedy fantasy film Click.

Hoffman and his father were cast as grandson and grandfather in the HBO television series Luck (2012). He played shoe designer Steve Madden in Martin Scorsese's The Wolf of Wall Street (2013).

Hoffman made his feature film directorial debut with Asthma (2014).

== Filmography ==
=== Film ===
Year	Title	Role	Notes
1988	Rain Man	Boy at Pancake Counter	
1991	Hook	Little League Player	
1999	Liberty Heights	Turk	
2001	Sugar & Spice	Ted	
2004	King of the Corner	Ed Shifman	
2004	I Heart Huckabees	Valet	
2005	National Lampoon's Adam and Eve	Ferguson	
2006	Click	22-30-year-old Ben	
2009	Rosencrantz and Guildenstern Are Undead	Julian Marsh	
2010	10 Years Later	Josh Hughes	
2010	Barney's Version	Michael Panofsky	
2012	Random Acts of Violence	Fleischer	
2012	Reform	Yosef	Short film
2012	Generation Um...	Rob	
2013	Enter the Dangerous Mind	Jim Whitman	
2013	The Wolf of Wall Street	Steve Madden	
2014	Asthma		Directorial debut
2014	She's Funny That Way	Hotel Bellboy	
2016	Goldbricks in Bloom	Miles	
2019	Otherhood	Daniel Liberman	
2019	The Irishman	Allen Dorfman	
2020	Sister of the Groom	Liam	
2021	Superior	Michael	
2022	Sam & Kate	Sam	

=== Television ===
Year	Title	Role	Notes
2001	Undeclared	Lee	"Rush and Pledge", "Hell Week"
2005	Arrested Development	Jeff	"Switch Hitter"
2012	Californication	Club Guy	"Boys & Girls"
2012	Luck	Brent Bernstein	"1.9"
2013	Two Wrongs	Zach	TV film
2016	Ray Donovan	Jake Raleigh	
2019; 2021; 2023	Wu-Tang: An American Saga	Steve Rifkind	Recurring role; 9 episodes
