= David Waller =

English actor (1920–1997)

David Waller (27 November 1920 – 23 January 1997) was an English actor best known for his role as Inspector Jowett in the British television series Cribb. He also appeared as Stanley Baldwin in ITV's Edward & Mrs Simpson (1978), and in "The Woman He Loved" (1988).

Waller worked extensively in the theatre and was a mainstay at the Royal Shakespeare Company from its founding until the early 1980s. He played Bottom in the original cast of Peter Brook's celebrated 1970 Royal Shakespeare Company production of A Midsummer Night's Dream. He also appeared in films including roles in Work Is a Four-Letter Word (1968), Perfect Friday (1970), Shadowlands (1985), Lady Jane (1986) and The Secret Garden (1987).

Waller was married. He died in 1997.

== Partial filmography ==
- Work Is a Four-Letter Word (1968) - Mr. Price
- Perfect Friday (1970) - Williams
- Shadowlands (1985) - Warnie Lewis
- Lady Jane (1986) - Archbishop Cranmer
- The Secret Garden (1987) - Dr. Craven
- Miss Marple: 4:50 from Paddington (1987)- Inspector Duckham

== Notable theatre roles ==
- Pandarus in Troilus and Cressida, Royal Shakespeare Company, 1968 and 1976
- Claudius in Hamlet, RSC 1970
- Bottom in Midsummer Night's Dream, RSC 1970
- Caesar in Julius Caesar, RSC 1987
