= Matthew Francis (producer) =

British television producer

Matthew Francis is a British television producer who is best known for his BBC sitcoms including My Dad's the Prime Minister, Gimme Gimme Gimme, and Office Gossip.

He appeared in the original production of Zigger Zagger with the National Youth Theatre in London in 1967.

Celia Imrie has said that Francis had a very bad bicycle accident when he was younger (he said his head was included in textbooks as it was so badly crushed) and had "such joie de vivre having recovered.”
