= Lisa Hoffman =

American businesswoman (born 1954)

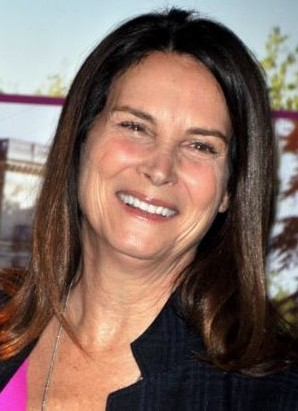
- Hoffman at a premiere of Quartet in March 2013
- Born: Lisa Jo Gottsegen; September 1, 1954 (age 72); Los Angeles, California, U.S.
- Education: University of Colorado at Boulder (1976)
- Occupations: Founder and president of Lisa Hoffman Beauty
- Spouse: Dustin Hoffman (m. 1980)
- Children: 4, including Jake

Lisa Jo Gottsegen Hoffman (born September 1, 1954) is an American businesswoman. She is the founder and president of Lisa Hoffman Beauty.

== Life ==
Hoffman graduated from University of Colorado at Boulder in 1976 with a bachelor's degree in psychology. She is Jewish.

Hoffman is married to American actor Dustin Hoffman. They married in Roxbury, Connecticut on October 12, 1980. They have four children together: Jacob Edward (born 1981), Rebecca Lillian (born 1983), Maxwell Geoffrey (born 1984), and Alexandra Lydia (born 1987). She is stepmother to Hoffman's daughters from his first marriage: Karina (born 1966) and Jenna (born 1970).

== Career ==
In 2007, Hoffman released a line of beauty products under the brand Lisa Hoffman Beauty. She is the founder and current president of Lisa Hoffman Beauty, which specializes in fine fragrance products.

In 2008, Lisa Hoffman was named "Newcomer of the Year" by Women's Wear Daily magazine. Lisa Hoffman Beauty was also named among the "Beauty's Top 40 of 2008" by Redbook magazine. Lisa Hoffman Beauty won an Allure Best of Beauty award in 2008 and 2009. In 2009, Lisa Hoffman Beauty won two nominations for the Top Five FiFi Finalist in the Unique Boutique category. The fragrances Madagascar Orchid and Japanese Agarwood were nominated alongside Acqua di Parma, Karl Lagerfeld, Chanel, and Tom Ford.

In 2012, Lisa Hoffman Beauty was nominated for two FiFi Awards, in the category of Technological Breakthrough, for their fragrance tools and their "Fine Fragrance Jewelry" collection. The company has been recognized for advanced algorithms that identify personal fragrance preferences for consumers. The "Fine Fragrance Jewelry" collection was nominated for an award in Technological Breakthrough in Packaging Technology and Delivery Systems. The company was also nominated as a finalist in the HBA International Package Design Awards (IPDA) - an industry-specific award.

In 2015, Lisa Hoffman Beauty won the ICMAD Award for its Brazilian Begonia Fragrance Bracelet.
