= Anna Graham Hunter =

American writer and career coach

- Born: Brooklyn, New York
- Occupations: Writer, career coach

Anna Graham Hunter (born c. 1968) is an American writer and career coach. Hunter was the subject of public attention in the wake of widespread sexual misconduct allegations against Harvey Weinstein in 2017 when she revealed to Hollywood Reporter and in an interview with journalist Cynthia McFadden that Dustin Hoffman had sexually harassed her on the set of the 1985 TV movie Death of a Salesman when Hoffman was 47 and Hunter was 17. Hoffman has since apologized to her for any pain he caused, though denies he did anything wrong. Hunter has written about the experience of coming forward as part of #MeToo.

Hunter was born in Brooklyn, New York and grew up there. She graduated from Stuyvesant High School in 1985 and graduated with a B.A. in Classics from Smith College in 1989. Hunter currently lives in Los Angeles. Despite being sometimes called an "actress" in the media, Hunter has never acted.
