= Henry Livings =

English playwright and screenwriter

Livings in 1970

Henry George Livings (20 September 1929 – 20 February 1998) was an English playwright and screenwriter, who worked extensively in British theatre, radio and television from the 1950s to the 1980s. Starting as an actor, he was inspired by the dramatist Brendan Behan, whom he encountered while a member of the Theatre Workshop company in the mid-1950s, and began writing plays.

As a working-class Northerner he focused on characters from a similar background to his own and paid little attention to the traditional theatrical elements of plot and character development. He showed the English working class in humorous ways while celebrating them in ways that would bring laughter, without overlooking darker images. Believing that theatre audiences could not concentrate on a scene for more than a few minutes, Livings developed a personal technique of play construction: his plays often consist of seven-minute sections strung together, and a coherent continuous narrative dispensed with.

== Life and career ==
=== Early years ===
Livings was born in Prestwich, Lancashire, on 20 September 1929, the son of George Livings (a shop manager) and his wife Dorothy née Buckley. He attended Park View Primary School from 1935 to 1939 and the Stand Grammar School from 1940 to 1945, where, according to his fellow dramatist Alan Plater, he enjoyed the learning but developed a lifelong contempt for the associated snobbery and elitism. He won a scholarship to the University of Liverpool, where from 1948 to 1950 he studied French and Spanish. After leaving the university without taking a degree he spent two years (1950 to 1952) doing his compulsory National Service in the Royal Air Force, during which time he served as a cook. Before going into the theatre Livings held various jobs. His first experience as an actor was in the roles of Curio and Sebastian in Twelfth Night at the Century mobile theatre at Hinckley, Leicestershire, in February 1954. From there he moved to the Theatre Royal, Leicester and then to repertory companies at, successively, Dundee, Canterbury and Belfast as well as playing in pantomimes in Bradford and Southsea.

Livings gained experience as an actor in what The Times has described as "the controlled anarchy" of Joan Littlewood's Theatre Workshop, which he joined in 1956. His first appearance before a London audience was in Brendan Behan's The Quare Fellow, first at Theatre Workshop's base at the Theatre Royal Stratford East and then in the West End at the Comedy Theatre. It was a play that influenced Livings as a potential author and Littlewood introduced him to a new perspective on the theatre; he wrote, "Littlewood opened out my understanding of the art more than any other has done. Her illuminations of the relevance of the theatre to life and society (they coincide), and to the basic teaching of Stanislavsky, are still fundamental to me". In 1957 he married a fellow member of the Theatre Workshop company, Judith Frances "Fanny" Carter; they had a son, Toby, and a daughter, Maria. In 1958, while still with the company, Livings appeared in a small role in the comedy film Carry On Sergeant. He also appeared in supporting roles in television dramas, including T. S. Eliot's The Cocktail Party (1957) and Bill Naughton's Starr and Company (1958).

=== 1958–1962: early plays ===
Like several of the Theatre Workshop company, Livings was inspired to try his hand at playwriting, and in 1958 he wrote Jack's Horrible Luck, a loosely knit series of episodes involving a naive young sailor ashore in Liverpool exploring a comic but disturbing underworld of low-lifes. He sold the play to the BBC but it was not produced until August 1961, when Barry Foster and Wilfred Brambell led the cast in a BBC Television broadcast. By that time, another television play by Livings, The Arson Squad, had been transmitted (April 1961) and his first stage play, Stop It, Whoever You Are, had been presented at the Arts Theatre in February of that year with Brambell and Arthur Lowe in the cast.

The Stage expressed reservations about parts of the script of Stop It, Whoever You Are, but found Livings "a writer of originality and promise, not yet able to control his ideas and material with enough precision, clarity and art to make them as effective as they could be, but interesting and entertaining all the same". Livings showed an instinct for dramatic writing and a fair display of craft, the reviewer added, that left him looking forward to the playwright's next work. The other critics were divided. J. C. Trewin disliked the piece, writing that if the play were meant as a joke "it is a dismal one". The anonymous reviewer in The Times remarked that the humour "falls clumsily between sophisticated and unsophisticated". In The Daily Herald, David Nathan wrote, "Trapped halfway between revulsion and laughter, skewered between disgust and admiration, I have to report that the Arts Theatre is showing the most extraordinary play In London". In The Daily Express, Bernard Levin wrote, "there were 20 minutes in the second act during which I laughed so much that I was not merely in pain but feared that I had done myself some serious physical mischief". He concluded by begging his readers to go to see the play – "But don't take the Lord Chamberlain". (Note: The Lord Chamberlain was the official censor of plays in Britain, but the Arts Theatre was a club and not technically a public venue, and so the Lord Chamberlain's writ did not run there.) The piece won for Livings the Evening Standard Award for "most promising playwright".

Among other plays by Livings are Big Soft Nellie (1961), whose witless hero creates chaos in a radio repair shop; and the stage and later television comedy Nil Carborundum (1962), set in an RAF kitchen and drawing on the author's experience of National Service. The stage version of the latter was presented by the Royal Shakespeare Company (RSC), with a cast headed by Nicol Williamson and Graham Crowden. Several critics compared it to a Whitehall farce. Trewin contrasted it with Arnold Wesker's Chips with Everything, another play about life for national servicemen in the RAF, premiered within weeks of Livings's play, concluding that "where Livings treated station life farcically, Wesker lashes out in fury … at the general humiliation of a conscript's life". In an adaptation for BBC television in October 1962, Williamson and Crowden recreated their stage roles and the author appeared in a small part. Kelly's Eye, mounted at the Royal Court Theatre in June 1963, was a straightforward drama, which disappointed some critics, including Kenneth Tynan who had hoped for more of Livings's farcical anarchy. It was directed by David Scase and starred Williamson, Sarah Miles and Arthur Lowe.

=== 1964–1972: later plays ===
Peter Hall, director of the RSC, commissioned Livings's next play, Eh? which was produced at the company's London base, the Aldwych Theatre, in October 1964. David Warner played the central figure, Valentine Brose, and Donald Sinden played his bemused employer. The play was later staged at the Circle in the Square Theatre in New York, with Dustin Hoffman, running for 232 performances and bringing Livings to the attention of American audiences. The critic Louis Gianetti described the play as "probably the best English farce since the death of Shaw". The Times described it as "the high-point of Livings's career as a dramatist". Hall directed a cinema adaptation of the play as Work Is a Four-Letter Word in 1968. Warner again starred as Valentine.

Scase directed The Little Mrs Foster Show at the Liverpool Playhouse in November 1966 with Barbara New and John Malcolm in the central roles. The author's friend and frequent collaborator Alex Glasgow acted in the production as well as providing the music. The play depicts a European couple caught up in an uprising in an African country. In The Guardian, Benedict Nightingale described the play as the author's "mixture of farce and blood" more extreme than ever ... "his most obviously serious play".

Good Grief, premiered at the Library Theatre in Manchester in July 1967, was described as "a popular evening's entertainment". It featured Livings and Glasgow with Jean Boht and Brian Miller in two one-act plays and three comic sketches. Livings's last full length stage play was The Finest Family in the Land (later retitled The ffinest ffamily in the Land) a straightforwardly comic piece, first given at the Theatre Royal, Lincoln in June 1970 and revived by the Theatre Workshop in 1972. The play had originally been titled The Ffinest Ffucking Ffamily in the Land, but Livings was persuaded that this was a little too strong.

=== Later years ===
Livings also wrote short stories and screenplays; he contributed to the TV series Juliet Bravo (1980) and Bulman (1985). In 1971 he and Glasgow starred in Get The Drift for BBC Television, based on their stage and radio show The Northern Drift, and billed as "a comedy series of mild and bitter humour with sweet and sour songs to tickle the palate". Their guests included Bernard Cribbins, Harry Carpenter, Roy Kinnear and Bryan Pringle. Livings worked with the director Ultz on a translation of Federico García Lorca's play The Public, published in 1994.

Separated from his wife, Livings lived from 1982 with Myra Brenner, a friend from university days. Plater reported that in Livings's last years "the years of dedicated late night drinking and pipe smoking had taken their toll". He died at his home in the Lancashire village of Delph on 20 February 1998.

== Character and reputation ==
Plater writes that Livings was "passionate and principled, impatient of mean-spirited fools in high places, a lover of anarchy in low places", and that the plays are "surreal farces, a million miles away from the bog-standard gritty northern realism into which so much regional drama tends to be categorised" In the view of the obituarist in The Times, Livings perfected a personal technique of play construction – the seven-minute take. He considered that – possibly because of television – no theatre audience could pay attention to one thing for more than seven minutes, and his plays often consist of seven-minute movements strung together. The critic Irving Wardle commented that because of this there are "isolated turns, brilliant self-contained oases of theatrical vitality with an arid trudge from one to the next". Wardle added, "If there is one thing that sets his plays apart from those of his contemporaries, it is that they seem to have been enormous fun to write; and that, for all their leaden stretches of linking material, they repeatedly communicate that fun to the audience".

The academic Steven H. Gale writes that Livings has been variously described as an Absurdist, an Angry Young Man, and a member of the "kitchen sink" school. Gale adds that the plays are:

about the British working class, and the dramatist tends to pay little attention to the traditional elements of plot and character development. His prime intent seems to be to make his audience laugh, and the vices of the farce are the means by which he attains his goal.

In Gale's view Livings captures the language patterns of the working class, and shares with his contemporaries Samuel Beckett and Harold Pinter "a distrust of the simple, overblown exposition of the well-made play and Shavian comedies".

== Plays ==
Source: Encyclopedia of British Humorists.

- Stop It, Whoever You Are (1961)
- Big Soft Nellie (1961)
- Nil Carborundum (1962)
- Kelly's Eye (1963)
- Eh? (1964)
- The Little Mrs Foster Show (1966)
- Good Grief (1967) (One-acts and sketches: "After the Last Lamp", "You're Free", "Variable Lengths", "Pie-Eating Contest", "Does It Make Your Cheeks Ache?" and "The Reasons for Flying")
- Honour and Offer (1968)
- The Gamecock (1969)
- Rand (1969)
- Variable Lengths and Longer: An Hour of Embarrassment (1969)
- Boggan (1970)
- The Rifle Volunteer (1970)
- Beewine (1970)
- The ffinest ffamily in the Land (1970)
- You're Free (1970)
- Mushrooms and Toadstools (1970)
- Tiddles (1970)
- Brainscrew (1971)
- Cinderella: A Likely Tale (1972; adaptation of Charles Perrault's story)
- The Tailor's Britches (1973)
- Jonah (1974)
- Jug (1975)
- Shuttlecock (1976)
- The Astounding Adventures of Tom Thumb (1979)

== Notes, references and sources ==
=== Sources ===
- Gale, Steven H (1996). Encyclopedia of British Humorists. New York: Garland. ISBN 0824059905.
- Herbert, Ian, ed. (1972). Who's Who in the Theatre (fifteenth ed.). London: Sir Isaac Pitman and Sons. ISBN 978-0-273-31528-5.
- Lorca, Federico García (1994). Plays Three. London: Methuen. ISBN 0413652408.
- Ross, Andrew (2015). Carry On Actors: The Complete Who's Who of the Carry On Film Series. Coventry: Fantom. ISBN 9781781961506.
- Tucker, Martin; Rita Stein, eds. (1966). Modern British Literature. New York: F. Ungar. ISBN 0804432759.
