= Murray Schisgal =

American playwright, screenwriter (1926–2020)

- Born: Murray Joseph Schisgal; November 25, 1926; Brooklyn, New York, U.S.
- Died: October 1, 2020 (aged 93); Port Chester, New York, U.S.
- Occupations: Screenwriter, playwright

Murray Joseph Schisgal (November 25, 1926 – October 1, 2020) was an American playwright and screenwriter.

== Early life ==
Schisgal was born in Brooklyn, New York City, New York. He was the son of Jewish immigrants, Irene (Sperling), a bank clerk, and Abraham Schisgal, a tailor.

== Education ==
He dropped out of high school and worked as a radio operator during World War II. He went to night school to get a diploma, while pushing a hand truck in the Garment District to support himself. He studied at Brooklyn Conservatory of Music. In 1953, he graduated from Brooklyn Law School with an honorary degree and LLB. He then studied at Long Island University in Brooklyn and later earned a Bachelors of Arts at the New School for Social Research in 1959.

== Career ==
Schisgal won his first recognition for the 1963 off-Broadway double-bill The Typists and The Tiger, which received the Drama Desk Award. His 1965 Broadway debut, Luv, was nominated for a Tony Award for Best Play and for Best Author of a Play. Other credits include Jimmy Shine, 74 Georgia Avenue, Naked Old Man and All Over Town, which received a Drama Desk nomination.

Schisgal also wrote The Love Song of Barney Kempinski, which was the first presentation of ABC Stage 67, and the screenplay for The Tiger Makes Out. Along with Larry Gelbart, Schisgal co-wrote the screenplay for Tootsie, for which he was nominated for an Oscar, Golden Globe, and BAFTA, and for which he won awards from the Writers Guild of America, New York Film Critics Circle, National Society of Film Critics and the Los Angeles Film Critics Association.

== Personal life and death ==
He married Reene Shapiro in 1958, a movie producer; she died in 2017. They had two children. In 1984, he signed a letter protesting German arms sales to Saudi Arabia.Schisgal died on October 1, 2020, in Port Chester, New York, at the age of 93.

== Filmography ==
Year	Title	Role	Notes
1982	Tootsie	Party Guest	Also co-screenwriter
