= The Tiger Makes Out =

1967 film by Arthur Hiller

- Promotional movie poster for the film
- Directed by: Arthur Hiller
- Screenplay by: Murray Schisgal
- Based on: The Tiger by Murray Schisgal
- Produced by: George Justin
- Starring: Eli Wallach; Anne Jackson
- Cinematography: Arthur J. Ornitz
- Edited by: Robert C. Jones
- Music by: Milton "Shorty" Rogers
- Production company: Elan Productions
- Distributed by: Columbia Pictures
- Release date: August 18, 1967 (New York City)
- Running time: 94 minutes
- Country: United States
- Language: English

The Tiger Makes Out is a 1967 American black comedy film directed by Arthur Hiller, and starring Eli Wallach and his wife Anne Jackson. The plot concerns a kidnapper and his unintended victim. It marked Dustin Hoffman's film debut.

== Plot ==
Ben Harris, an alienated Greenwich Village postal carrier, decides to get a girl by kidnapping her. Putting his plan into operation one rainy night, he spots an attractive young woman. He races ahead of her and prepares an ambush. However, his would-be target finds shelter from the downpour, and he ends up pulling a bag over Gloria Fiske instead.

When he carries her back to his basement apartment and removes the bag, he is dumbfounded to find he has captured a middle-aged housewife. With no alternative, he makes do with the person he has caught, but she proves to be not quite what he envisaged.

== Cast ==
- Eli Wallach as Benjamin "Ben" Harris
- Anne Jackson as Gloria Fiske
- Bob Dishy as Jerome "Jerry" Fiske
- John Harkins as Leo
- Ruth White as Edna Kelly
- Roland Wood as Tom Kelly
- Rae Allen as Beverly
- Sudie Bond as Miss Lane
- David Burns as Louie Ratner
- Jack Fletcher as Pawnbroker
- Bibi Osterwald as Theodora Ratner
- Charles Nelson Reilly as Mr. Henry—Registrar
- Frances Sternhagen as Woman on Bus
- Elizabeth Wilson as Receptionist
- Kim August as Toni the Songbird
- Alice Beardsley as Kentucky Neighbor
- Mariclare Costello as Rosi
- David Doyle as Marty—Housing Clerk
- Dustin Hoffman as Hap
- Michele Kesten as Waitress
- James Luisi as Pete Coppola
- Remak Ramsay as Housing Guard
- Sherman Raskin as Red Schwartzkopf
- John Ryan as Toni's Escort
- Edgar Stehli as Old Man
- Oren Stevens as Policeman
- Judy Graubart as Woman Passing Lassoed Hydrant

== Home media ==
The Tiger Makes Out was released on DVD by Sony Pictures Home Entertainment August 5, 2014, via its Choice Collection DVD-on-demand service, as a Region 1 DVD.

== See also ==
- List of American films of 1967
