= Jimmy Shine =

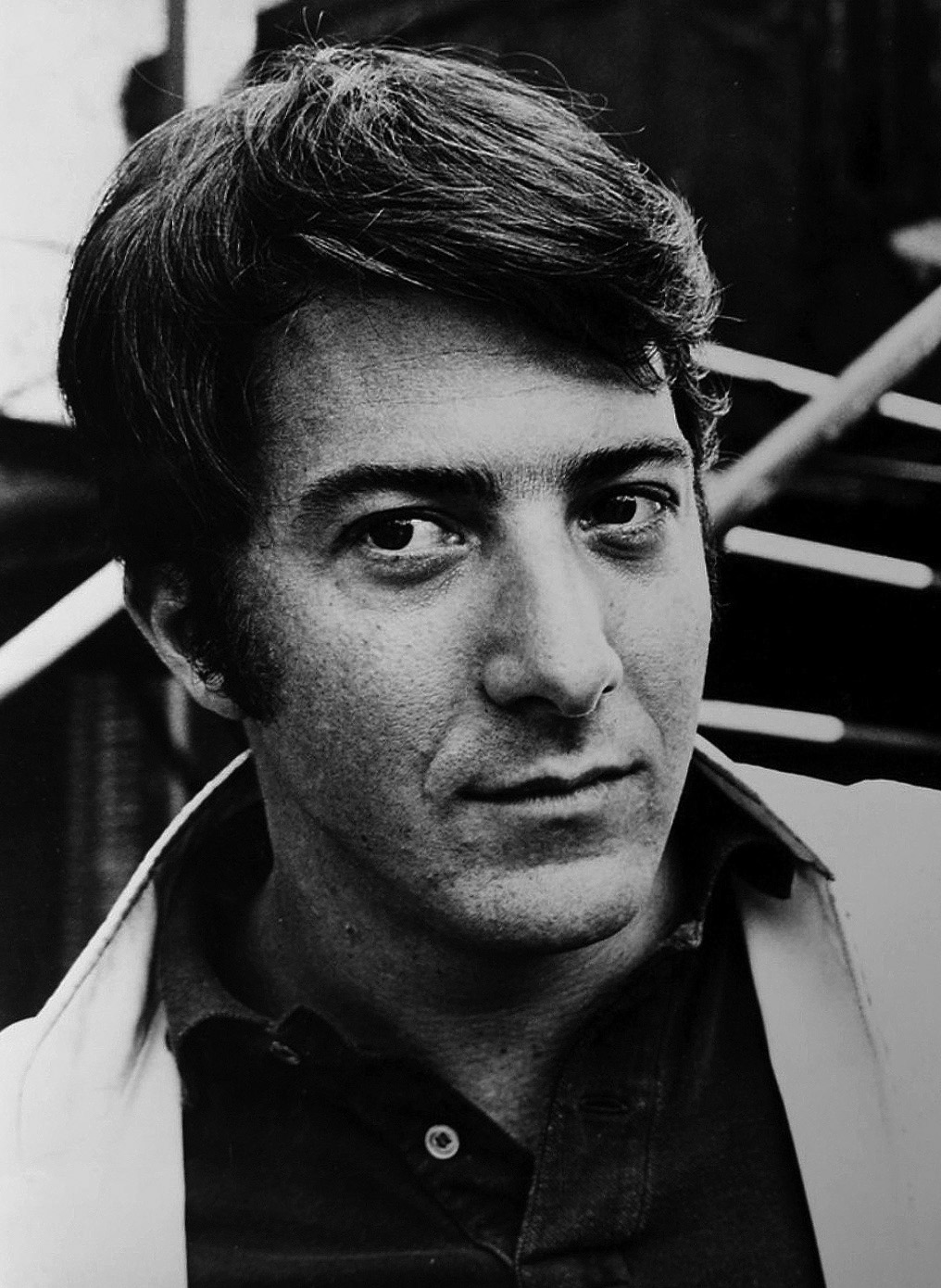
Publicity photo of Dustin Hoffman for Jimmy Shine

Jimmy Shine is a play with music. It was written by Murray Schisgal with music and lyrics by John Sebastian. The plot centers on its title character who is a struggling artist in Greenwich Village during the 1960s. Much of the story follows Jimmy's relationships with various women in his life and how he copes with love, sex, death, and rejection in relation to both himself and his art.

== Production history ==
Jimmy Shine opened on Broadway on December 5, 1968, at the Brooks Atkinson Theatre, where it closed on April 26, 1969, after 161 performances. The production starred Dustin Hoffman in the title role, with Pamela Payton-Wright as Constance Fry, Susan Sullivan as Elizabeth Evans, Rose Gregorio as Rosie Pitkin, Charles Siebert as Michael Leon, Cleavon Little as Lee Haines, Rue McClanahan as Sally Weber, Barbara Cason as Miss Green, Eli Mintz as Mr. Lepke, Dorothy Emmerson as Rita, Gale Dixon as Millie, and Arnold Wilkerson as Arnold. Hoffman won a Drama Desk Award for Outstanding Performance for his role in the production.

A production of the show was staged in 1969 in Chicago, with Jim Jacobs in the title role. Jacobs (later of Grease fame) was nominated for a Jeff Award for his work.
