= Esio Trot (film) =

2015 television film by Dearbhla Walsh

- DVD cover
- Based on: Esio Trot by Roald Dahl
- Written by: Richard Curtis; Paul Mayhew-Archer
- Directed by: Dearbhla Walsh
- Starring: Judi Dench; Dustin Hoffman; James Corden; Richard Cordery; Pixie Davies
- Composer: Tim Phillips
- Country of origin: United Kingdom
- Original language: English

Production
- Executive producers: Richard Curtis; Bob Weinstein; Harvey Weinstein; Matthew Read
- Producer: Hilary Bevan Jones
- Cinematography: Ben Smithard
- Editor: Tim Murrell
- Running time: 90 minutes
- Production company: Endor Productions

Original release
- Network: BBC One
- Release: 1 January 2015

Roald Dahl's Esio Trot, or simply Esio Trot, is a British comedy drama television film directed by Dearbhla Walsh and written by Richard Curtis and Paul Mayhew-Archer, based on the 1990 novel, Esio Trot, by Roald Dahl. In the film, a retired bachelor (Dustin Hoffman) falls in love with his neighbour, a widow (Judi Dench) who keeps a tortoise as a companion after the death of her husband.

Roald Dahl's Esio Trot debuted in the United Kingdom on 1 January 2015, on BBC One. It was seen by 7.86 million viewers, making it the ninth-most watched programme on BBC One and across all United Kingdom TV channels for the week ending 4 January 2015.

== Cast ==
- Judi Dench as Mrs. Lavinia Silver
- Dustin Hoffman as Mr. Henry Hoppy
- James Corden as The Narrator
- Richard Cordery as Mr. Pringle
- Pixie Davies as Roberta
- Geoffrey McGivern as the Pet Shop Owner
- Jimmy Akingbola as the keen Pet Shop Owner
- Lisa Hammond as Mrs. Desmond
- Anna Cannings as Mrs. Court
- Joseph West as Philip
- Katie Lyons as Philip's Mother
- Polly Kemp as the woman on Bus
- Pik-Sen Lim as Mrs. Wu
- Salo Gardner as Mr. Mavrokoukoudopolous
- Emily Ralph as the Little Girl

== Music ==
The musical score was composed by Tim Phillips. All the commercial music used in the show is of New Orleans jazz singer and trumpeter Louis Armstrong and his All-Stars, which includes Edmond Hall, Trummy Young, Billy Kyle, Arvell Shaw and Barrett Deems.

== Differences from Dahl's novel ==
- Mr. Pringle (Hoppy's rival for the affections of Mrs Silver) is not a part of the novel.
- In the novel, Mr. Hoppy's plan of switching tortoises to fool Mrs. Silver into thinking that hers is growing is successful, and she never discovers the truth. In the movie, she discovers Mr. Hoppy's plan, but still marries him.

== Production ==
Charlotte Moore announced the television film at the Edinburgh International Television Festival on 22 August 2013. It was produced by Hilary Bevan Jones and directed by Dearbhla Walsh. Bevan Jones said, "To bring together two of the world's favourite actors in Dame Judi and Dustin is a dream come true. Richard and Paul have captured the magic of Roald Dahl’s wonderful tale and I am thrilled that Dearbhla is to direct it." It was adapted by Richard Curtis and Paul Mayhew-Archer, and filming took place in May 2014 in London. The apartment block featured in the film is Adelaide Wharf in Haggerston.

== Reception ==
The adaptation was well received by the audience, with Lucy Mangan of The Guardian writing, "An utterly, completely, inescapably beguiling adaptation of Roald Dahl's book by Richard Curtis and Paul Mayhew-Archer, directed by Dearbhla Walsh, narrated by James Corden and starring Dustin Hoffman and Judi Dench. You could argue that with a pedigree like that nothing could have gone wrong, but it doesn’t work like that. Although you can maximise your chances of being able to conjure it, charm is ineffable, alchemical. You can't measure it out by the yard and cut it off when you've got enough. You can't splash it on to a scene and then stopper it to make sure you've got enough for the next take. It just … appears, if you're careful and if you're lucky. And then it ripples through your film, or your play or your book, animating all and subtly transforming everything from a prosaic good – or even great – into a thing of wonder."

=== Accolades ===
Year	Award	Category	Recipient(s)	Result	Ref.
2015	UK Film Festival	Best Comedy Film	Roald Dahl’s Esio Trot	Won	
2016	International Emmy Awards	Best Performance by an Actor	Dustin Hoffman	Won	
2016	International Emmy Awards	Best Performance by an Actress	Judi Dench	Nominated	
