= Willy Loman =

Fictional character from Death of a Salesman

William "Willy" Loman
- Death of a Salesman character
- Detail of the original 1949 Death of a Salesman Playbill cover art that depicts Willy Loman
- First appearance: Death of a Salesman
- Created by: Arthur Miller
- Portrayed by: Broadway: Lee J. Cobb, Albert Dekker and Gene Lockhart (1949), George C. Scott (1975), Dustin Hoffman (1984), Brian Dennehy (1999), Philip Seymour Hoffman (2012), Wendell Pierce (2019), Nathan Lane (2026); Film: Fredric March (1951), Cobb (1966), Rod Steiger (1966), D. Hoffman (1985), Warren Mitchell (1978–1996), Dennehy (2000)

In-universe information
- Gender: Male
- Occupation: Traveling salesman
- Family: Ben Loman (brother)
- Spouse: Linda Loman
- Children: Biff Loman (son), Harold "Happy" Loman (son)

William "Willy" Loman is a fictional character and the protagonist of Arthur Miller's play Death of a Salesman, which debuted on Broadway with Lee J. Cobb playing Loman at the Morosco Theatre on February 10, 1949. Loman is a 63-year-old travelling salesman from Brooklyn with 34 years of experience with the same company who endures a pay cut and a firing during the play. He has difficulty dealing with his current state and has created a fantasy world to cope with his situation. This does not keep him from multiple suicide attempts.

He is the central character in a play that has won the Tony Award for Best Broadway Production four times. People playing the role have earned many significant accolades for acting including Golden Globe Award, Olivier Award, Tony Award, Primetime Emmy Award, Screen Actors Guild Award, and Drama Desk Awards and many award nominations.

== Decline ==
Willy Loman is an aging Brooklyn, New York salesman whose less than spectacular career is on the decline. He has lost the youthful verve of his past and his camaraderie has faded away. His business acumen is still at its peak, but he is no longer able to leverage his personality to get by. Time has caught up with him. The play presents Loman's struggle "to maintain a foothold in the upward-striving American middle class" while combating his own self-doubt that plagues him in reminders from the past that his life rests on unsolid ground. According to Charles Isherwood, Loman is the play's dominant character because "It is his losing battle against spiritual and economic defeat that provides the narrative spine of the play." Loman is a symbolic representation of millions of white collar employees who outlived their corporate usefulness. He lives in a world with delusions about how popular, famous, influential and successful he is and about the prospects for the success of his sons. His wife not only allows these delusions, but also buys into them, somewhat. His misplaced values of importance and popularity are shaken to the core by his declining ability to leverage those self-perceived traits successfully as he grows older.

"And they know me, boys, they know me up and down New England. The finest people. And when I bring you fellas up, there'll be open sesame for all of us, 'cause one thing, boys: I have friends."

— Willy Loman

Loman's world crumbles around him during the play. According to Associated Press correspondent Cynthia Lowry's review of the drama, "we watched an aging, defeated traveling salesman move inexorably toward self-destruction, clinging desperately to fantasies". The play begins with the 63-year-old Loman dealing with a recent pay cut after 34 years on the job at a time when he is having difficulty meeting his financial responsibilities. In the second act, he deals with being fired. He is fired by the son of the man who had hired him 36 years prior. In the play, Loman reveals his past in scenes from his memory that the audience is challenged to judge for accuracy. Loman had succeeded in large part due to his ability to ingratiate himself with his bosses and appeal to his potential clients; thus, he continually impresses upon his sons the importance of popularity.

== Reviews ==
Although the play was performed earlier in Philadelphia, the February 10, 1949 Broadway opening is considered the debut and on February 11, Brooks Atkinson of The New York Times said the following: "Mr. Cobb's tragic portrait of the defeated salesman is acting of the first rank. Although it is familiar and folksy in the details, it has something of the grand manner in the big size and the deep tone." While reviewing a touring production of Death of a Salesman, Los Angeles Times critic Laurie Winer described Loman as "...the saddest, self-centeredest soul in American drama, a character who will continue to haunt the landscape as long as there are fathers and sons." United Press International critic Rick Du Brow described Loman as "...the aging failure of a salesman who has wasted his life by living in a world of delusions and shallow values..." Willy is described as a "suffering. . .middle-aged man at the end of his emotional rope". Lowry described the production as depicting "the end of a man when his dream world is shattered".

The play's author, Arthur Miller, described the role of Willy Loman as one for a large character in a small physical body, and noted he had difficulty finding the right actor at first. The part was originally written for a physically small man, with Willy at one point saying to his wife, "I'm short. I'm very foolish to look at." When Cobb was cast, the line was changed to "I'm fat. I'm very foolish to look at," and a reference to Willy being called a "shrimp" was changed to a "walrus." Subsequent productions used whichever version was appropriate to the actor playing Willy; Dustin Hoffman, for example, used the original. Loman's Brooklyn accent is part of the challenge of the role. In 1950, Miller described Loman as a man who upon hearing society's "thundering command to succeed" found himself staring at a failure in the mirror. The Amazon.com editorial review by Ali Davis states that "Willy Loman is a salesman desperately hustling for a living even as he slides into old age." Rovi Corporation's Matthew Tobey describes him as an everyman who has to cope with the sudden realization that he is over the hill, and retreats into a fantasy world in which he remains important. The Huffington Post's theater critic, Wilborn Hampton, describes the role as "one of the most complicated characters in dramatic literature".

The play is a statement on the idea that a man is valued by his position in life. Loman never matures enough to realize that being popular without any substance or skill is meaningless in the end, and Miller uses Loman to make a point against anti-intellectualism. In the end, Loman gives way to the belief that his inability to be a successful man and father means that his life has been a failure.

== Family ==
Willy's marriage to his wife Linda is described as "symbolic". Linda is a devoted wife who understands her husband's needs, dreams and shortcomings. Linda has emotional scenes as she attempts to manage Willy's emotional collapse and deals with her two adult sons, who have both wasted their lives following the easy road of pursuing popularity, as guided by their father. She breaks down as she confides in her sons about Willy's disintegration and reveals that he has attempted suicide before.

Willy has always made the point to his sons that being popular and having contacts is the key to success. His older, less successful son, Biff, causes "old hopes and boiling resentments" to return by visiting home after losing yet another job. Biff and Willy love each other, but do not get along; Biff resents Willy for insisting he pursue a life he doesn't want, while Willy thinks Biff has failed on purpose to spite him. Their relationship is the emotional lynchpin of the production. Biff attempts to help his father see what has become of him. In the end, Biff decides that he must force his father to see the truth rather than his fanciful images, for his own good, regardless of its toll on his father. This is the emotional climax of the show as he bares his soul, saying, "Pop, I'm nothing! I'm nothing, Pop! Can't you understand that? There's no spite in it any more. I'm just what I am, that's all." At Willy's funeral, Biff states that "He had the wrong dreams...He never knew who he was."

Although Willy's younger son, Happy, is self-absorbed, he attempts to humor his father. He views his Uncle Ben (Willy’s dead brother) as his role model rather than his father because Ben went out to the world as a teenager and was rich by the age of 21. He repeatedly reminds Willy of this. In the end, he is determined to not only adopt his father's dream (even when it killed him), but to surpass him as he states "It's the only dream you can have—to come out No. 1 man."

Besides interacting with his wife and his sons, Willy spends much time during the play in fantasy conversations with his long-dead brother Ben, whom Willy still idolizes, calling on him for guidance, for instance, when he is fired from his job. Toward the end of the play—when Willy has dreamed up a scheme to kill himself so that Biff can receive the money from his insurance policy and finally become successful—he "debates" the merits of his plan with Ben, finally deciding to go ahead with it after Ben (in his mind) comes to agree with him that it's a good idea.

== Critical history ==
Loman is the central role of the only play that has won a Tony Award for Best Broadway Production four times (Best Play, Best Revival and twice Best Revival of a Play).

Each of the four Broadway revivals has brought critical acclaim to the role. In addition, the role has been reprised in film with six English-language film portrayals of this character, at least four of which received critical acclaim. Three actors have won Golden Globe Awards playing the role, two have won Drama Desk Awards playing the role and actors playing the role have also won a Primetime Emmy Award, a Screen Actors Guild Award and a Tony Award. The role has been nominated for an Oscar Award, a BAFTA Award, a Grammy Award, three Tony Awards and three Primetime Emmy Awards. At least two West End productions have earned Olivier Awards for this role.

Although Cobb did not earn critical acclaim when he originated the role, he did when he reprised it for television. Other actors who have played the role on Broadway or in English-language cinema or television have almost all received critical acclaim. On Broadway, the role was reprised by George C. Scott (1975, Tony nomination), Dustin Hoffman (1984, Drama Desk award), Brian Dennehy (1999, Tony and Drama Desk awards), Philip Seymour Hoffman (2012, Tony nomination), and Wendell Pierce (2022). In cinema and on television, the role has also been highly acclaimed: Fredric March (1951, Golden Globe award and both Oscar and BAFTA nominations), Cobb (1966, Emmy and Grammy nominations), Rod Steiger (1966), D. Hoffman (1985, Golden Globe and Emmy awards), Warren Mitchell (1996) and Dennehy (2000, Golden Globe and SAG awards and Emmy nomination).

=== Awards ===
Fredric March won the Golden Globe Award for Best Actor – Motion Picture Drama at the 9th Golden Globe Awards and was nominated for Academy Award for Best Actor at the 24th Academy Awards and BAFTA Award for Best Actor in a Leading Role (Foreign) at the 6th British Academy Film Awards.

Brian Dennehy won Tony Award for Best Actor in a Play at the 53rd Tony Awards in 1999, while Philip Seymour Hoffman was nominated for the same award at the 66th Tony Awards in 2012 and George C. Scott was nominated for the award at the 30th Tony Awards in 1976.

Dennehy also won the Golden Globe Award for Best Actor – Miniseries or Television Film at the 58th Golden Globe Awards in 2001 and the Screen Actors Guild Award for Outstanding Performance by a Male Actor in a Miniseries or Television Movie at the 7th Screen Actors Guild Awards in 2001 and was nominated for the Primetime Emmy Award for Outstanding Lead Actor in a Miniseries or a Movie at the 52nd Primetime Emmy Awards in 2000.

Dustin Hoffman and Brian Dennehy won Drama Desk Award for Outstanding Actor in a Play at the 1984 and 1999 Drama Desk Awards.

Hoffman also won both the Golden Globe Award for Best Actor – Miniseries or Television Film at the 43rd Golden Globe Awards in 1986 and Primetime Emmy Award for Outstanding Lead Actor in a Miniseries or a Movie at the 38th Primetime Emmy Awards in 1986.

Lee J. Cobb was nominated for a Primetime Emmy Award for Outstanding Single Performance by an Actor in a Leading Role in a Drama at the 19th Primetime Emmy Awards as well as a Grammy Award for Best Spoken Word, Documentary or Drama Recording at the 9th Grammy Awards in 1967.

Warren Mitchell earned the Laurence Olivier Award for Actor of the Year in a Revival in 1979 for his West End theatre performance of the role. Dennehy earned a Laurence Olivier Award for Best Actor in 2006 for his reprisal of the role in the West End.

=== Commentary ===
Time described Scott's performance as "...a performance of staggering impact....When his head is bowed, it is not in resignation but rather like that of a bull bloodied by the picador yet ready to charge again." Philip Seymour Hoffman's performance came at a time when the Occupy Wall Street movement echoed the play while its target audience could not afford the $120 ticket price. The March version of Loman presented him as more mentally unstable than other versions.

== Influences ==
Miller noted that although he wrote the play in 1947 and 1948, the play grew out of his life experiences, that included his father losing everything in the 1929 stock market crash. Miller claims that the role was actually modeled on one of his uncles.

Dustin Hoffman says that the play was the first one he ever read and predated his interest in becoming an actor. He noted that the play resonated with him because his father was a travelling salesman and he had an older brother. Hoffman eventually played the role in a high-school production. In 1965, Hoffman served as the assistant director in an off-Broadway revival of A View from the Bridge at the Sheridan Square Playhouse with a cast that included Robert Duvall and Jon Voight. The show's director Ulu Grosbard suggested to Miller that Hoffman had the potential to make a great Willy Loman. Miller was unimpressed and later wrote that "My estimate of Grosbard all but collapsed as, observing Dustin Hoffman's awkwardness and his big nose that never seemed to get unstuffy, I wondered how the poor fellow imagined himself a candidate for any kind of acting career."
