= Eh? (play) =

Play by Henry Livings

- Written by: Henry Livings

Premiere
- Date: October, 1964
- Place: Aldwych Theatre, London

Eh? is a play by Henry Livings.

== Production history ==
=== Original production ===
The play premièred at the Aldwych Theatre in London's West End, produced as part of the Royal Shakespeare Companys London Season, in October 1964 and featured David Warner, Donald Sinden and Janet Suzman and was directed by Peter Hall.

=== Subsequent productions ===
Two years later it opened Off-Broadway at the Circle in the Square Downtown on Bleecker Street on October 16, 1966. The production was directed by Alan Arkin, using the pseudonym "Roger Short". Arkin had stepped in as director about two weeks before it opened and after two directors had quit. He used a pseudonym because he was under contract to begin direction of Hail Scrawdyke! only a week later.

The US production starred Dustin Hoffman as Valentine Brose, Alexandra Berlin as Betty Dorrick, Dana Elcar as Price, Carl Gabler as Aly, Joseph Maher as Reverend Mort and Elizabeth Wilson as Mrs. Murray. The play was the first major critical success in Hoffman's career, garnering him a Theatre World Award and Drama Desk Award for his performance. Livings won an Obie Award for Best Play. This production closed on May 24, 1967, after 233 performances.

== Film adaptation ==
It was adapted for the 1967 film Work Is a Four-Letter Word by Jeremy Brooks, starring David Warner and Cilla Black.
