= List of awards and nominations received by Once and Again =

List of awards won by Once and Again
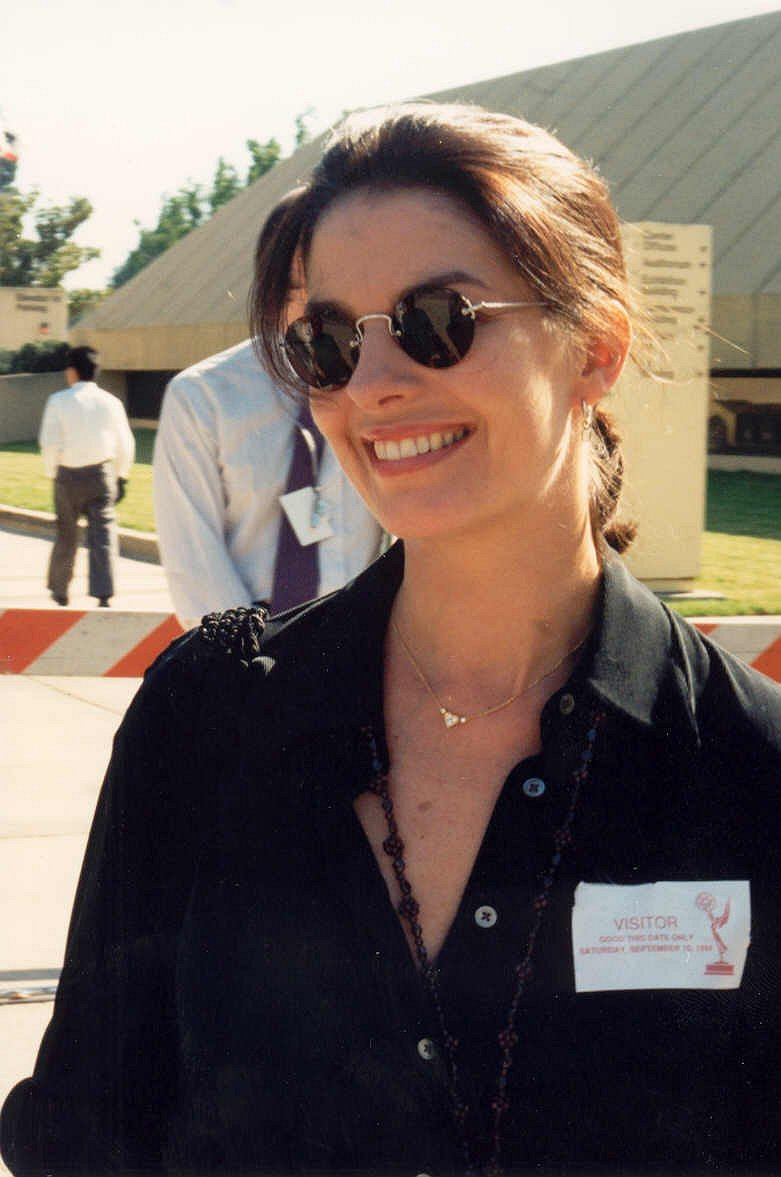
- Sela Ward received many awards and nominations for her performance as Lily Manning.
Awards and nominations
Award	Won	Nominated
Austin Film Festival	1	1
Artios Awards	0	1
Emmy Awards	1	5
GLAAD Media Awards	0	1
Golden Globe Awards	1	5
Humanitas Prize	1	2
People's Choice Awards	1	1
PRISM Awards	1	1
Satellite Awards	0	3
Screen Actors Guild Awards	0	1
TCA Awards	0	3
Teen Choice Awards	0	2
TV Guide Award	0	4
Q Awards	1	2
Writers Guild of America Award	0	1
Young Artist Award	1	2
YoungStar Award	0	1
- Total number of wins and nominations
Totals	8	37
- References

Once and Again is an American television drama series created by Ed Zwick and Marshall Herskovitz and produced by The Bedford Falls Company and Touchstone Television. The show originally aired in the United States on ABC between September 21, 1999, and April 15, 2002, with 63 episodes split over three seasons. The series stars Sela Ward and Billy Campbell as Lily Manning and Rick Sammler, two divorced parents who begin a romance. The series follows their relationship and the effect it has on their respective families.

Once and Again garnered acclaim and amassed 37 nominations for various industry awards. This includes 5 Emmy awards (with 1 win), 5 Golden Globe awards (with 1 win), 3 TCA awards, 2 Q awards (with 1 win), and a Writers Guild of America awards.

== Awards and nominations ==
=== Emmy Awards ===
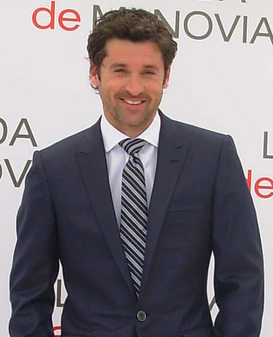
Patrick Dempsey received an Emmy nomination for his guest starring role on the series.

Presented by the Academy of Television Arts & Sciences since 1949, the Primetime Emmy Award is an annual accolade that honors outstanding achievements in various aspects of television such as acting, directing and writing. Once and Again received 5 nominations, winning one award for Outstanding Lead Actress in a Drama Series, awarded to Sela Ward.

==== Primetime Emmy Awards ====
Year	Category	Nominee(s)	Episodes(s)	Result	Ref.
2000	Outstanding Lead Actress in a Drama Series	Sela Ward as Lily Manning	"Pilot"	Won	
2001	Outstanding Lead Actress in a Drama Series	Sela Ward as Lily Manning	"Second Time Around"	Nominated	
2001	Outstanding Guest Actor in a Drama Series	Patrick Dempsey as Aaron Brooks	"Strangers and Brothers"	Nominated	

==== Creative Arts Emmy Awards ====
Year	Category	Nominee(s)	Result	Ref.
2001	Outstanding Casting for a Drama Series	Amy Lippens and Lizzie Scheck	Nominated	
2002	Outstanding Casting for a Drama Series	Amy Lippens	Nominated	

=== Golden Globe Awards ===
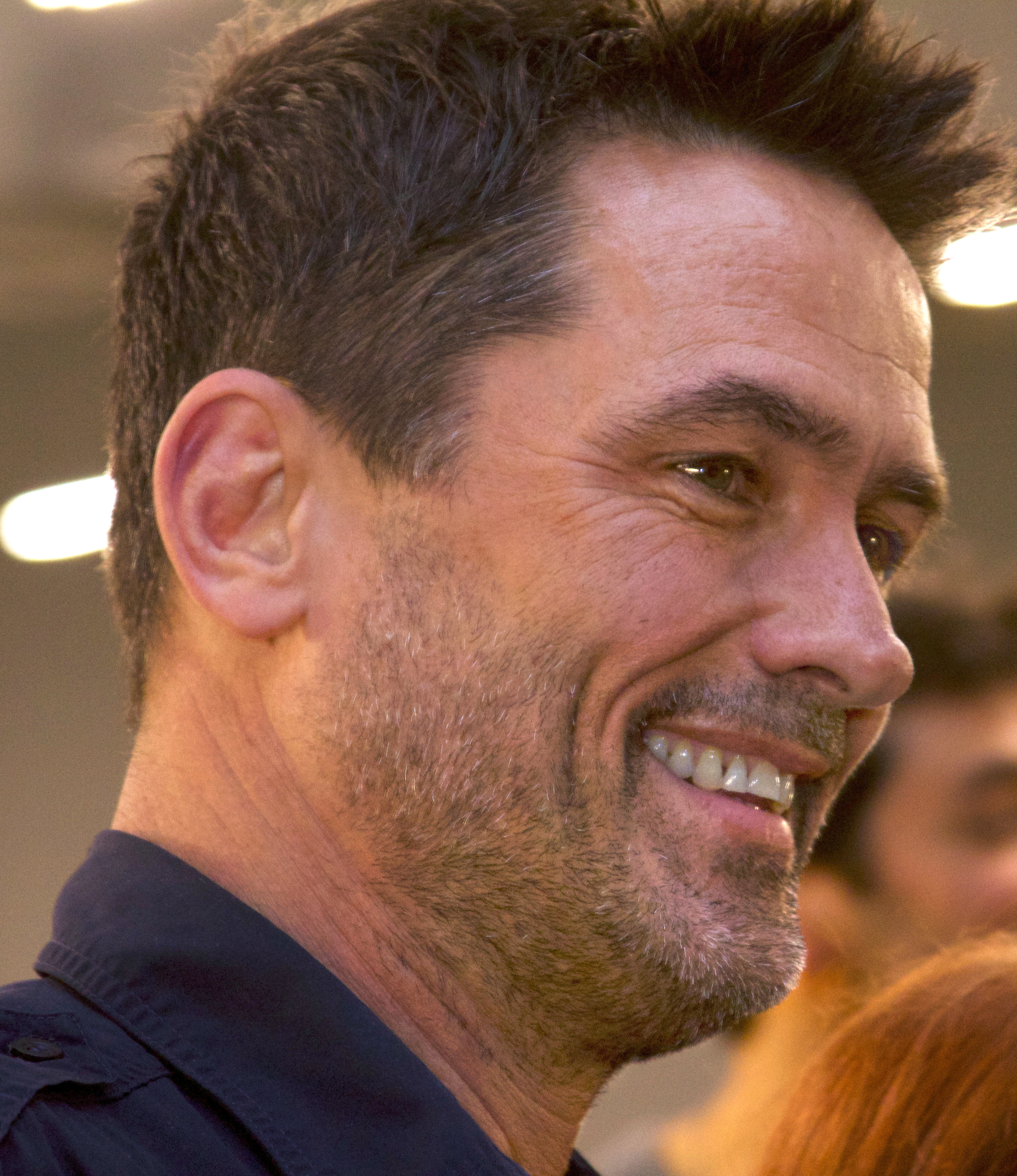
Billy Campbell received a nomination for Best Actor – Television Series Drama.

The Golden Globe Award is an annual accolade presented by the Hollywood Foreign Press Association (HFPA) which honors the best performances in television and film. Once and Again received five nominations, winning two awards for Best Television Series – Drama.

Year	Category	Nominee(s)	Result	Ref.
1999	Best Television Series – Drama	Once and Again	Nominated	
1999	Best Actor – Television Series Drama	Billy Campbell as Rick Sammler	Nominated	
1999	Best Actress – Television Series Drama	Sela Ward as Lily Manning	Nominated	
2000	Best Actress – Television Series Drama	Sela Ward as Lily Manning	Won	
2001	Best Actress – Television Series Drama	Sela Ward as Lily Manning	Nominated	

=== Q Awards ===
The Q Award, presented by the Viewers for Quality Television since 1986, recognizes critically acclaimed programs and performers for their outstanding achievements in television. During its tenure, Once and Again won an award for Best Actress in a Quality Drama Series received by Sela Ward.

Year	Category	Nominee(s)	Result	Ref.
2000	Best Quality Drama Series	Once and Again	Nominated	
2000	Best Actress in a Quality Drama Series	Sela Ward	Won	

=== Satellite Awards ===
During its tenure, Once and Again received three award nominations for a Satellite Award.

Year	Category	Nominee(s)	Result	Ref.
2000	Best Television Series – Drama	Once and Again	Nominated	
2000	Best Actress – Television Series Drama	Sela Ward	Nominated	
2001	Best Actress – Television Series Drama	Sela Ward	Nominated	

=== TV Guide Awards ===
Year	Category	Nominee(s)	Result	Ref.
2000	Favorite New Series	Once and Again	Nominated	
2000	Favorite Actor in a New Series	Billy Campbell	Nominated	
2000	Favorite Actress in a New Series	Sela Ward	Nominated	
2001	Actress of the Year in a Drama Series	Sela Ward	Nominated	

=== Television Critics Association Awards ===
Awarded by the Television Critics Association since 1985, the Television Critics Association Award (TCA Award) is an annual accolade that recognizes outstanding achievements in television programming and acting performances. Once and Again received three nominations.

Year	Category	Nominee(s)	Result	Ref.
2000	Outstanding Achievement in Drama	Once and Again	Nominated	
2000	Outstanding New Program of the Year	Once and Again	Nominated	
2000	Individual Achievement in Drama	Sela Ward	Nominated	

=== Other awards ===
Award	Year of ceremony	Category	Nominee(s)	Result	Ref.
Artios Awards	2002	Best Casting for TV, Drama Episodic	Amy Lippen	Nominated	
Austin Film Festival Awards	2001	Drama Primetime Teleplay Competition Award	Once and Again	Won	
GLAAD Media Awards	2003	Outstanding Drama Series	Once and Again	Nominated	
Humanitas Prize	2001	60 Minute Category	Richard Kramer for "Strangers and Brothers"	Nominated	
Humanitas Prize	2002	60 Minute Category	Marshall Herskovitz and Ed Zwick for "Food for Thought"	Won	
People's Choice Awards	2000	Favorite Male Performer in a New Television Series	Billy Campbell	Won	
PRISM Awards	2000	TV Prime Time Drama Series Episode	"Outside Hearts"	Won	
Screen Actors Guild Awards	2001	Outstanding Performance by a Female Actor in a Drama Series	Sela Ward as Lily Manning	Nominated	
Teen Choice Awards	2001	Choice TV Drama	Once and Again	Nominated	
Teen Choice Awards	2002	Choice TV Actor: Drama	Shane West	Nominated	
Writers Guild of America Awards	2000	Television: Episodic Drama	Richard Kramer for "Strangers and Brothers"	Nominated	
Youth Artist Awards	1998–1999	Best Performance in a Drama Series: Supporting Young Actress	Julia Whelan	Nominated	
Youth Artist Awards	1999–2000	Best Ensemble in a TV Series (Drama or Comedy)	Evan Rachel Wood, Julia Whelan and Meredith Deane	Nominated	
YoungStar Awards	2000	Best Young Actress in a Drama TV Series	Evan Rachel Wood as Jessie Sammler	Nominated	
