= Rose Gregorio =

American actress (1925–2023)

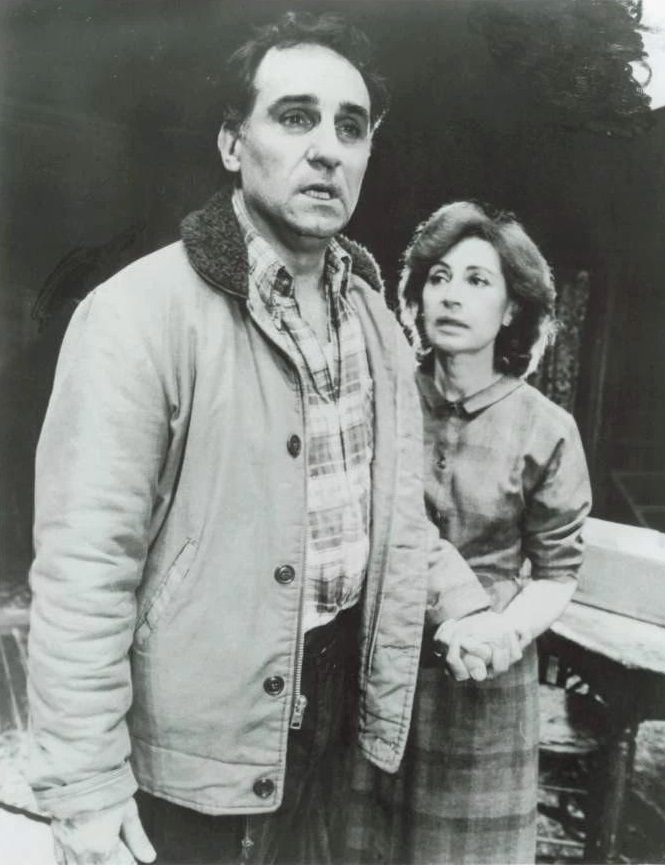
- Gregorio with Tony Lo Bianco in the 1983 revival of A View From the Bridge
- Born: October 17, 1925; Chicago, Illinois, U.S.
- Died: August 17, 2023 (aged 97); New York City, U.S.
- Occupation: Actress
- Spouse: Ulu Grosbard (m. 1965; died 2012)

Rose Gregorio (October 17, 1925 – August 17, 2023) was an American actress. She began her career appearing mostly in theatre in Chicago and New York City during the 1950s and 1960s. During the 1970s she became more active in television and film, appearing mostly in supporting roles.

== Early years ==
Gregorio's parents came from Italy. She was born in Chicago, Illinois on October 17, 1925.

== Early career ==
Gregorio began her career appearing onstage in Chicago in the 1950s. She made her television debut in 1961 on Armstrong Circle Theatre in The Fortune Tellers, starring opposite Val Avery. The following year, she moved to New York City, making her Off-Broadway debut as the title character in William Snyder's The Days and Nights of BeeBee Fenstermaker at the Sheridan Square Playhouse, a production which included Robert Duvall. She next appeared as Martha in the 1963 play Journey to the Day at the Lucille Lortel Theatre.

During the mid-1960s, Gregorio served as a standby performer for many Broadway shows in case the regularly scheduled actress was unable to perform. She made her official Broadway debut in 1968 in Jack Gelber's The Cuban Thing at the Henry Miller's Theatre. The same year, she landed her first film role, the role of Sylvia Finney in Frank Perry's The Swimmer. The following year, she returned to Broadway to appear with Dustin Hoffman in Jimmy Shine.

== Later career ==
In the 1970s, her career became more centered on film and television. Her movie appearances include Gloria Soloway in Who Is Harry Kellerman and Why Is He Saying Those Terrible Things About Me? (1971), Ruth in Desperate Characters (1971), Angela in Mr. Ricco (1975), Elaine Cassel in Eyes of Laura Mars (1978) and Brenda Samuels in True Confessions (1981). She appeared in television movies such as Paradise Lost (1971) and The Death of Richie (1977).

In 1977, Gregorio returned to Broadway after an eight-year hiatus in the original production of Michael Cristofer's The Shadow Box as Agnes; she garnered nominations for the Tony Award for Best Performance by a Featured Actress in a Play and the Drama Desk Award for Outstanding Featured Actress in a Play. After that, her theatre appearances were sporadic. She appeared as Laurie in the Off-Broadway production of David Blomquist's Weekends Like Other People at the Marymount Manhattan Theatre in 1982. The following year, she returned to Broadway as Beatrice in the original production of A View from the Bridge at the Ambassador Theatre and again in 1988 as Helga in the original production of M. Butterfly at the Eugene O'Neill Theatre. In 1993, she appeared as Karen Frick in the Manhattan Theatre Club's production of Arthur Miller's The Last Yankee, and in 2000, she portrayed the roles of Lena and Sandra in Beth Henley's Family Week at the Century Center for the Performing Arts.

Gregorio also remained active in film and television during the 1980s and 1990s. Her film credits include Brenda Samuels in True Confessions (1981), which was directed by her husband, Mrs. Sabantino in Five Corners (1987), Pina in City of Hope (1991), Pina in Tarantella (1995), Grandma Rosie Cappadora in The Deep End of the Ocean (1999), and Helen in Maze (2000). On television, she portrayed Helen Hathaway, the mother of Carol Hathaway, on ER from 1996 to 1999. She made guest appearances on The Doctors (1972), The Bob Newhart Show (1974), Medical Center (1974), The Rookies (1975), Harry O (1975), Jigsaw John (1976), Mary Hartman, Mary Hartman (1976), The Rockford Files (1978), Charlie's Angels (1979), Falcon Crest (1984), Doogie Howser, M.D. (1989), Murder, She Wrote (1991), The Practice (1997) and Law & Order: Criminal Intent (2003), and appeared in numerous television movies.

== Personal life and death ==
Gregorio was married to Belgian-American stage and film director Ulu Grosbard from 1965 until his death in 2012.

Gregorio died of pneumonia at her home in Greenwich Village on August 17, 2023, at the age of 97. She is interred at Kensico Cemetery.

== Awards ==
In 1977, Gregorio received the Clarence Derwent and Drama Desk Awards, as well as a Tony nomination, for her portrayal of Agnes in the original production of Michael Cristofer's The Shadow Box.

== Filmography ==
=== Film ===
| Year | Title | Role | Notes |
|---|---|---|---|
| 1968 | The Swimmer | Sylvia Finney | |
| 1971 | Who Is Harry Kellerman and Why Is He Saying Horrible Things About Me? | Gloria Soloway | |
| 1971 | Desperate Characters | Ruth | |
| 1971 | I Never Promised You a Long Run | Jean | Short |
| 1975 | Mr. Ricco | Angela | |
| 1978 | Eyes of Laura Mars | Elaine Cassell | |
| 1981 | True Confessions | Brenda Samuels | |
| 1987 | Five Corners | Mrs. Sabantino | |
| 1991 | City of Hope | Pina | |
| 1995 | Tarantella | Pina | |
| 1999 | The Deep End of the Ocean | Rosie Cappadora | |
| 2000 | Maze | Helen | |
| 2015 | Irene & Marie | Irene | Short |
| 2017 | Good Time | Loren Ellman | |

=== Television ===
| Year | Title | Role | Notes |
|---|---|---|---|
| 1961 | Armstrong Circle Theatre | Princess Maria | Episode: "The Fortune Tellers" |
| 1961 | Naked City | Puerto Rican Woman | Episode: "Show Me the Way to Go Home" |
| 1963 | East Side/West Side | Miss Reagan | Episode: "My Child on Monday Morning" |
| 1964 | Route 66 | Mrs. Santos | Episode: "Follow the White Dove with the Broken Wing" |
| 1965 | New York Television Theatre | Beebee Fenstermaker | Episode: "The Days and Nights of Beebee Fenstermaker" |
| 1972 | The Doctors | Lorraine Jarrett | Guest role |
| 1974 | Tell Me Where It Hurts | Agnes | TV film |
| 1974 | The Bob Newhart Show | Janet Hoffman | Episode: "Brutally Yours, Bob Hartley" |
| 1974 | Medical Center | Emma | Episode: "Saturday's Child" |
| 1975 | Miles to Go Before I Sleep | Selma | TV film |
| 1975 | The Rookies | Millie | Episode: "The Saturday Night Special" |
| 1975 | One of Our Own | Rose Sanantonio | TV film |
| 1975 | Harry O | Dorina | Episode: "Portrait of a Murder" |
| 1976 | Mary Hartman, Mary Hartman | Florence Baedecker | Episodes: "1.17", "1.18" |
| 1977 | The Death of Richie | Betty Firmani | TV film |
| 1977 | Sharon: Portrait of a Mistress | Anne Dowling | TV film |
| 1977 | The Storyteller | Mrs. Eberhardt | TV film |
| 1978 | The Rockford Files | Natalie Cotton Arnow | Episode: "Local Man Eaten by Newspaper" |
| 1979 | Dummy | Jean Markin | TV film |
| 1979 | Charlie's Angels | Matron Wallace | Episode: "Caged Angel" |
| 1981 | Another World | Doris Wagner | 15 episodes |
| 1984 | Falcon Crest | Mary Giannini | Episodes: "Lord of the Valley", "The Intruder" |
| 1985 | Do You Remember Love | Betty Marcus | TV film |
| 1987 | The Last Innocent Man | Monica Powers | TV film |
| 1988 | Hothouse | Karen | Episode: "The Actress" |
| 1990 | Against the Law | Risa Ferrante | Episode: "The Price of Life" |
| 1991 | Murder, She Wrote | Rosa Abruzzi | Episode: "Family Doctor" |
| 1996–1999 | ER | Helen Hathaway | Guest role (seasons 3–5) |
| 1997 | The Practice | Michelle Sardo | Episode: "The Civil Right" |
| 2003 | Law & Order: Criminal Intent | Lupe Garcia | Episode: "See Me" |
