= The Days and Nights of BeeBee Fenstermaker =

The Days and Nights of BeeBee Fenstermaker is an American play by William Snyder. The work premiered Off-Broadway at the Sheridan Square Playhouse on September 17, 1962, closing on June 9, 1963 after 304 performances.

The production was directed by Ulu Grosbard and used set and lighting designs by Robin Wagner. The production starred Rose Gregorio as Beebee, Ann Wedgeworth as Nettie-Jo Repult, Mary Farrell as Melinda, Kate Harrington as Virginia, Virgilia Chew as Betty, Monroe Arnold as Interviewer, Stanley Beck as Ed Busby, and Robert Duvall as Bob Smith. Garnering critical praise, the play was later adapted by Snyder into two television films, one in English for British ATV drama with Patricia Neal as BeeBee, and one in German for German television with Loni von Friedl in the title role.
