= Jessica Savitch =

American television news reporter (1947–1983)

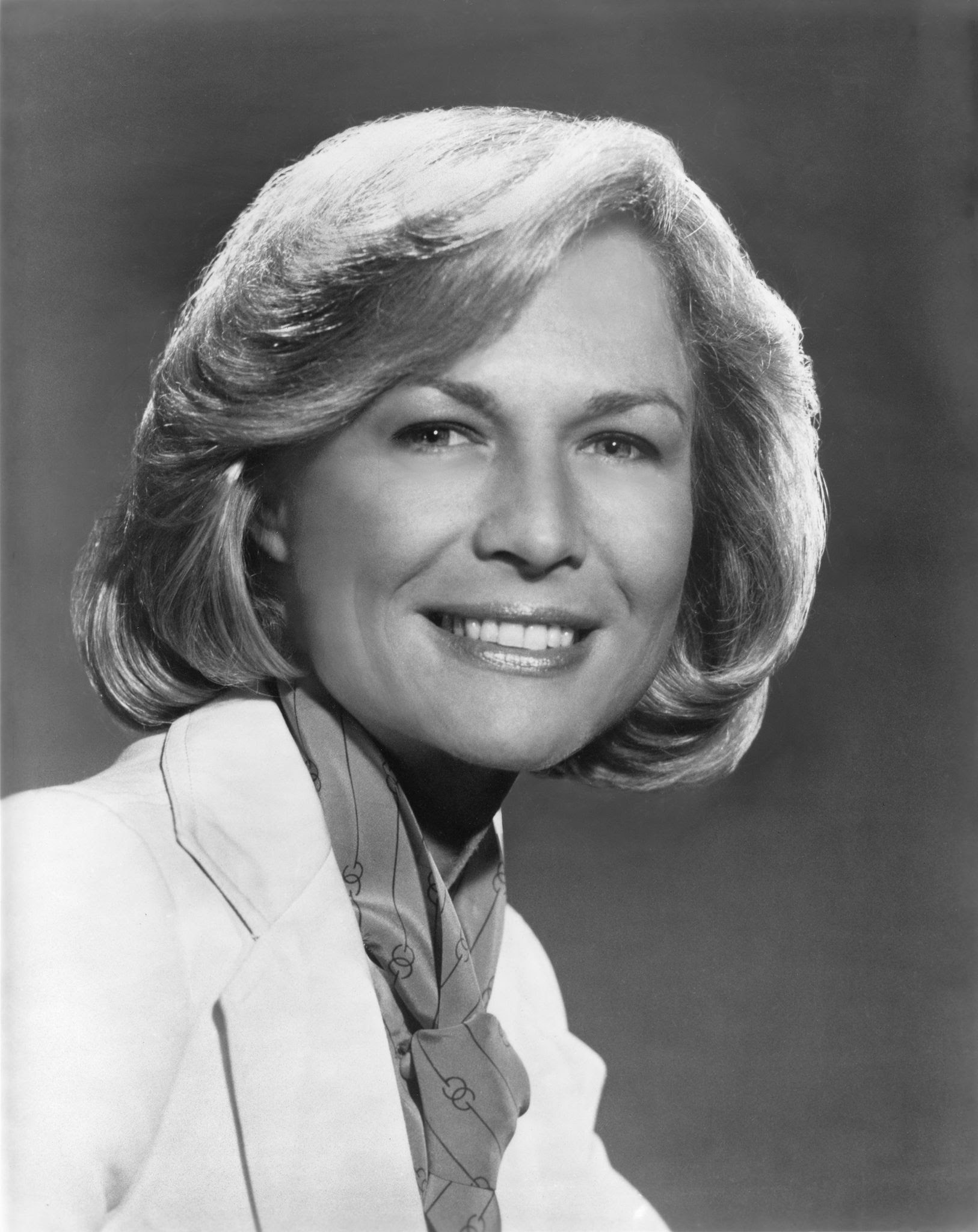
- Savitch in 1979
- Born: Jessica Beth Savitch; February 1, 1947; Wilmington, Delaware, U.S.
- Died: October 23, 1983 (aged 36); New Hope, Pennsylvania, U.S.
- Education: Ithaca College
- Occupation: Television journalist
- Years active: 1968–1983
- Spouses: Melvin "Mel" Korn (m. 1980; div. 1981); Dr. Donald Payne (m. 1981; died 1981)

Jessica Beth Savitch (February 1, 1947 – October 23, 1983) was an American television journalist who was the weekend anchor of NBC Nightly News and daily newsreader for NBC News during the late 1970s and early 1980s. Savitch was one of the first women to anchor an evening network newscast alone, following in the footsteps of Marlene Sanders of ABC News and Catherine Mackin of NBC News. She also hosted PBS's public affairs program Frontline from its January 1983 debut until her death in a car crash the following October.

Savitch was known for her audience appeal and her skill as an on-camera news reader, although she drew criticism for her relative lack of journalism experience. Prior to joining NBC News, she was a popular local anchorwoman in Philadelphia and before that, while working at a Houston television station, she was the first female news anchor in the South.

== Early life ==
Jessica Savitch was born on February 1, 1947, in Wilmington, Delaware. She was the eldest daughter of Florence (née Goldberger), a navy nurse, and David “Buddy” Savitch, who ran a clothing store. Her father was of Serbian Slavic and Jewish heritage and her maternal grandfather was of German and Russian Jewish heritage. Her maternal grandmother was of Italian American heritage and she was also Catholic.

Buddy Savitch suffered from nephritis, an incurable kidney disease. He died in 1959, when he was 33 and Jessica was 12. Her family then moved from Kennett Square, Pennsylvania, to Margate City, New Jersey. While attending Atlantic City High School, Savitch got a job co-hosting a rock show for teenagers on radio station WOND in Pleasantville; she soon became a newsreader and disc jockey for WOND as well. She was the first female disc jockey in the Pleasantville area.

Following her graduation from high school, Savitch attended Ithaca College in Ithaca, New York, as a communications major. She was an announcer for the college’s television station, WICB, and worked in radio at nearby Rochester's WBBF (now WROC-AM). There, she did voice-over commercial work, and became a popular top 40 disc jockey known as "Honeybee". She graduated from Ithaca College in 1968, but remained connected to the college, returning periodically to teach a mini-course on television news.

== Local news career ==
=== New York City ===
In 1969, Savitch was hired as an administrative assistant at WCBS, the CBS Radio flagship news station in New York City, where she also did freelance production work. WCBS refused to hire her as a reporter because she had no professional experience. With the permission of news director Ed Joyce and the help of a three-person crew, Savitch used the WCBS-TV facilities to make a television audition tape and sent copies to hundreds of television stations around the country seeking an on-air position. This included all cities big enough to have all three television networks. She received fewer than a dozen responses, and only got one job interview.

=== Houston ===
Despite her lack of broadcast news experience, Savitch was hired by KHOU-TV in Houston as the station's first female reporter. Dick John, the manager who hired her, said he did so because he was impressed with her ambition as well as her copywriting and speaking skills. When Savitch arrived at KHOU, she was the only female working in the news department other than one secretary; colleagues helped her learn the basics of her job. Because KHOU was non-union, she participated in many aspects of production as well as reporting on camera. A few months after joining KHOU, Savitch auditioned for and won a weekend anchor shift, becoming the first female news anchor in the South and beginning to develop the formal, mannered style of news delivery for which she later became known. Her report on a train derailment and fire received national exposure on the CBS Evening News with Walter Cronkite.

=== Philadelphia ===
In November 1972, Savitch joined KYW-TV, then the NBC affiliate (now CBS O&O) in Philadelphia, as a general assignment reporter and weekend anchor under a five-year contract.

Unlike the Houston station, this station was unionized, so Savitch was not permitted to do work other than on-camera newsreading and reporting. At the time KYW hired Savitch, it was under pressure from the Philadelphia chapter of the National Organization for Women (NOW) to place more women in then-non-traditional roles on the local news or else face a possible legal challenge to its broadcast license. When she was initially unable to obtain a weeknight anchor shift, Savitch attempted to break her KYW contract and take a job offered by CBS in New York. KYW refused to release her from her contract but agreed to raise her salary and (partly to satisfy NOW) make her a weeknight anchor. Savitch soon began to anchor noon news broadcasts as well, and eventually became part of a popular team of three anchors with Mort Crim and Vince Leonard on the 11:00pm news. Philadelphia viewers responded enthusiastically to her on-camera presence.

Impressed with her performance, NBC offered her a three-year contract starting in September 1977 as a Washington, D.C. correspondent and anchor. Savitch did her last newscast for KYW in August 1977.

Savitch got along well with some members of the KYW staff, including her regular location shooting crew, and her co-anchor Mort Crim. Crim later admitted that he was initially "not nice to her" due to his own male chauvinism, but the two later became good friends.

=== Multi-part series ===
Savitch won recognition for multi-part feature stories on unusual (for that time) topics. For example, Philadelphia KYW news director Jim Topping, inspired by his and his wife’s experience attending Lamaze classes, assigned Savitch to cover a five-part series on natural childbirth. Savitch and her camera crew reported on a local family who were expecting a second child. When it appeared this baby might not be born in time for the heavily-advertised series, the crew even compiled a list of other expectant mothers in the area as back-up; the baby was, in fact, born four days before the start date.

This series on childbirth began as scheduled on Monday and on Thursday, November 22, 1973 — Thanksgiving Day — showed much of the actual birth. Almost Golden states, “when KYW brought the scene into the audience’s living rooms on a warm holiday evening, it made for powerful television.” In addition, Topping told Savitch, “You've made your career."

Savitch frequently personalized her stories by making herself a part of them, such as serving as an undercover decoy [with police officers unobtrusively posted along the route] for two weeks as part of her series about rape. This series, entitled "Rape . . . the Ultimate Violation", won a Clarion Award for excellence from Women in Communications, Inc. In addition, KYW Philly received many requests for rebroadcast which it met. The series was also screened by community groups and state legislatures in Pennsylvania, New Jersey, and Delaware, helping to bring about legislative changes, and motivating several state and local governments to open rape crisis centers.

For the series which was titled “Lady Law,” Savitch primarily interviewed female law enforcement professionals from other cities. However, she also completed the Philadelphia Police Academy's training course, and she also engaged in activities such as shooting a handgun, jumping over oil barrels, squeezing under a barrier, and climbing a six-foot wall. This series won Savitch two awards, but it also left her with sore muscles and a “wrenched back” for some weeks afterwards.

Other multi-part series which starred Savitch included: single adults, marriage mills of Las Vegas, impact of divorce on American society, issue of when life begins and ends, Pennsylvania snow skiing in the Pocono Mountains, the “New Philadelphia Sound” in music, and traveling to Hollywood to interview Joey Bishop, Peter Boyle, Eddie Fisher and other Philadelphians who had made it big in show business.

=== Filling airtime during a technical problem which occurred during a 1976 Presidential debate ===
In 1976, she came to the attention of NBC executives while she was reporting from the first presidential campaign debate between President Gerald Ford and Democratic nominee Jimmy Carter, which was held at Philadelphia's Walnut Street Theatre. An audio line failed, delaying the debate and leaving three KYW reporters, including Savitch, to fill the 27 minutes of air time before the audio could be restored. KYW producer Cliff Abromats stated, “She [Savitch] was very good on her feet. She could think fast and ask the right questions, and she had the ability so many lack, to actually listen to the answer. Jessica would never miss it when someone said something unexpected.”

== National news career ==
=== NBC ===
Savitch joined NBC News in 1977 as a weekend anchor for NBC Nightly News. NBC also assigned her to do reporting work, including a brief stint as U.S. Senate correspondent.

Savitch was the network's second woman to anchor a weekend national newscast; Catherine Mackin had previously anchored NBC's Sunday evening newscast beginning in December 1976, before she left for ABC News the following year. Savitch later became the first woman to anchor the weeknight edition of NBC Nightly News, periodically substituting for the regular anchors John Chancellor and David Brinkley. She was also assigned to anchor short NBC News updates that ran approximately one minute and aired between regular prime time programs each evening, drawing a high number of viewers.

She began to fill more roles in NBC's news programming, serving as a regular panel member on Meet The Press, contributing to the news magazine programs Prime Time Saturday and Prime Time Sunday, and contributing commentary to the NBC Radio Network. She substituted as anchor on the Today and Tomorrow shows. She was offered the anchor position for an early-morning news program Early Today but turned it down.

As a network anchor, Savitch had a charismatic presence and became popular with network affiliates and viewers. A 1982 TV Guide poll named her the fourth most trusted news anchor in the country, above many of the most established male anchors of the period. Another 1982 poll named her the "sexiest" female anchor in the country. Affiliates agreed to run the NBC News Update segments largely because she would be presenting them. Her success influenced numerous aspiring female newscasters to model themselves after her look and delivery. In 1980, she was one of the twelve most popular speakers in the United States.

Savitch constantly worked on improving her news reading delivery, using a voice coach and other techniques. NBC executives and colleagues praised her skillful narration of film showing the murders of Congressman Leo Ryan and several others in a mass shooting by members of the Peoples Temple at Jonestown. There had not been time to view the film prior to its broadcast, and Savitch had to improvise her narration while viewing the graphic film for the first time.

=== PBS anchor ===
In January 1983, in addition to her work for NBC, Savitch began hosting a new public affairs documentary program on Public Broadcasting Service (PBS), Frontline. She continued as host until her death later that year, at which time Judy Woodruff took over as host.

=== October 3, 1983, live broadcast incident ===
Despite Savitch's competence and success as an anchor, by 1983, NBC was beginning to shift its focus to other female anchors, particularly Connie Chung. In June 1983, NBC removed Savitch from her regular Saturday evening anchor slot and replaced her with Chung, who also accepted the Early Today position that Savitch had rejected. From then until her death in October 1983, Savitch's only regular appearances on NBC were on the NBC News Digest segments. Savitch began feeling anxious about her job and showed signs of emotional instability.

On October 3, 1983, during an NBC News Digest segment, Savitch was slurring her speech, deviating from her script and ad-libbing her report. She performed a later segment without any issues that same evening. Savitch's flawed delivery fueled speculation that she was using drugs, specifically cocaine. However, she blamed the problems on a teleprompter malfunction, while her agent said it was due to the effects of pain medication which she was taking in response to recent facial reconstructive surgery which she underwent following a boating accident.

While some of Savitch's colleagues stated that they had seen evidence of drug use, other friends and associates of Savitch expressed skepticism because they did not believe that she had a drug problem. NBC correspondent Linda Ellerbee later said that she had asked network management to intervene, telling them, "You have to do something. This woman [Savitch] is in trouble." Ellerbee said that a network vice president responded, "We're afraid to do anything. We're afraid she'll kill herself on our time." When management failed to act, Ellerbee and other correspondents had tried to reach out to Savitch, who died before anything could be done.

Although Gwenda Blair wrote that Savitch's poor performance on the October 3 segment effectively ended her network career, a People magazine article which was published after her death stated that her NBC contract had actually been renewed (although the renewal was for just one year rather than her previous three-year contracts), that she would have reclaimed a spot as a substitute Sunday anchor for NBC Nightly News in January 1984, and that she was set to appear on another season of Frontline.

== Personal life ==
Savitch was married twice and had no children. Her first marriage in 1980 to Philadelphia advertising executive Melvin "Mel" Korn ended in divorce after eleven months. Korn reportedly divorced Savitch after learning that she had a significant drug problem.

Savitch's second marriage in March 1981 to Dr. Donald Payne, her gynecologist, lasted only five months. It ended in August 1981 when Payne, who had substance abuse problems of his own and suffered from depression, died by suicide in their Washington, D.C., townhouse. Savitch, who was in New York at the time, found his body when she returned; she returned to her work at NBC three weeks later.

Savitch had a long-term intermittent relationship with TV news executive Ron Kershaw, who had substance abuse problems and physically abused her during their relationship. In the early 1970s, while she was working for CBS in New York City, Savitch also had a romantic relationship with CBS News journalist Ed Bradley, who was then a WCBS radio reporter. According to Bradley, after the relationship ended they continued to have a "non-romantic, social, and professional relationship" until her death.

According to her biographers Blair and Nash, Savitch was a driven perfectionist who constantly battled insecurities about her appearance and ability, suffered from social anxiety, and tended to isolate herself from network colleagues. Both biographers also write that Savitch had a problem with cocaine that eventually affected her career. Biographers have also asserted that Savitch was bisexual and had romantic relationships with women as well as men. These assertions were disputed by Savitch's family and some of her friends after her death.

Savitch's friend, WNBC anchor Sue Simmons, said in a 2013 retrospective article marking the 30th anniversary of Savitch's death, "When the books and the movie came out [after her death], they made her out to be this troubled character. Nobody ever talked about her big heart, her loyalty, her sense of humor, and her fabulousness as a person."

== Death ==
On October 23, 1983, Savitch had dinner with Martin Fischbein, vice president of the New York Post, at the Chez Odette restaurant in New Hope, Pennsylvania. Savitch and Fischbein had been dating for a few weeks. They began to drive home about 7:15 p.m., with Fischbein driving and Savitch in the back seat with her dog, Chewy. It was raining heavily; Fischbein may have missed posted warning signs. He drove out of the wrong exit from the restaurant and up the towpath of the old Pennsylvania Canal's Delaware Division on the Pennsylvania side of the Delaware River. The Oldsmobile Cutlass Cruiser station wagon veered too far to the left and went over the edge into the shallow water of the canal. After falling approximately 15 feet (4.6 m) and landing upside down in 4 feet (1.2 m) to 5 feet (1.5 m) of water, the car sank into deep mud that sealed the doors shut. Savitch and Fischbein were trapped inside as water poured in. A local resident found the wreck at about 11:30 that night. Fischbein's body was still strapped behind the wheel, with Savitch and her dog in the back seat.

After autopsies, the Bucks County coroner ruled that both Savitch and Fischbein had died of asphyxiation by drowning. Neither Savitch nor Fischbein had any drugs other than alcohol in their systems, and they had consumed only small amounts of alcohol—about half a glass of wine each.

Savitch's family and a group of her friends later sued the New York Post (whose insurance covered the leased car Fischbein was driving), Fischbein's estate, Chez Odette, and the Commonwealth of Pennsylvania for damages in Savitch's death. The suit was settled, in 1988, for US$8 million (equivalent to $21.8 million in 2025), most of which was paid by the Post. Some of the money was used to establish scholarships for women studying for careers in broadcasting or journalism at Ithaca College and other institutions.

== Awards and honors ==
Savitch gave the main address at Ithaca College's 1979 commencement, at which she was awarded an honorary doctorate of humane letters. In 1980, she was elected to the Ithaca College Board of Trustees. The school’s television Studio A is named in honor of Savitch, and the college's Jessica Savitch Communications Scholarship was established to support students in the Roy H. Park School of Communications who demonstrate excellence, achievement, and promise in the field of broadcast journalism.

The Broadcast Pioneers of Philadelphia posthumously inducted Savitch into their Hall of Fame in 2006.

== Biographical works ==
Jessica Savitch published her own autobiography, Anchorwoman, in 1982. After her death, two posthumous biographies were written about her. According to The Washington Post, each of her biographers interviewed over 300 people in order to write their respective books. Although both biographies contain similar material, Savitch's family and friends have challenged as untrue portions of the books regarding her reporting skills and controversial aspects of her personal life (see Personal life).

The first biography, Almost Golden: Jessica Savitch and the Selling of Television News (Simon & Schuster, 1988) by Gwenda Blair, told Savitch's story within the broader context of the history of network news. It was later made into a Lifetime Network made-for-TV movie starring Sela Ward, called Almost Golden: The Jessica Savitch Story. When first aired, Almost Golden earned the second-highest rating ever for a cable television film up to that point. The television film was criticized for omitting or downplaying controversial aspects of Savitch's life and career that were discussed at length in Blair's book.

The second biography, Golden Girl: The Story of Jessica Savitch (Dutton, 1988) by Alanna Nash, became the basis of the 1996 theatrical film Up Close & Personal starring Michelle Pfeiffer and Robert Redford. Up Close & Personal was originally intended as a biographical film about Savitch. However, the plot of the movie was substantially changed to become a love story quite different from Savitch's life. According to Nash and John Gregory Dunne (who co-wrote the screenplay with his wife Joan Didion and wrote the book Monster: Living Off the Big Screen about the making of the film), this was because the filmmakers, including The Walt Disney Company that was financing the film, considered Savitch's life story too downbeat to be popular at the box office. Many reviews of the movie discuss how the film departed, probably for commercial reasons, from Savitch's actual biography.

The A&E series Biography featured an episode about Savitch and her relationship with her male peers, which inspired Will Ferrell to make the 2004 comedy film Anchorman: The Legend of Ron Burgundy, whose two main characters were based on her and Mort Crim. Lifetime also aired a documentary entitled Intimate Portrait: Jessica Savitch that was based on the perspectives of Savitch biographer Alanna Nash.

== Sources and further reading ==
- Blair, Gwenda (1988). Almost Golden: Jessica Savitch and the Selling of Television News. Simon and Schuster. ISBN 9780671632854.
- Nash, Alanna (1988). Golden Girl: The Story of Jessica Savitch. E.P. Dutton. ISBN 9780525246671.
- Savitch, Jessica (1983). Anchorwoman. New York: Putnam. ISBN 9780399127359.
