= Robert Allan Black =

American writer and director

- Education: San Jose State University
- Occupations: Writer; director
- Years active: 1970–present

Robert Allan Black is an American writer and film director. He wrote and directed the documentary Loving Henri (2016), which follows the life and work of philanthropist and concentration camp survivor Henri Landwirth (1927–2018).

== Early life ==
Robert Allan Black lived in various U.S. Army bases between the United States and Japan. After he graduated from San Jose State University, he wrote two screenplays, which were Remember the Thrill, loosely based on his years playing college football, and Austin City Limits, a love story set between Washington, D.C., and a honky-tonk in Texas.

== Career ==
Throughout the 1970s, he worked at several advertising agencies, including Honig-Cooper & Harrington. From 1976 to 1979, Black worked as a freelancer under the name Robert Allan Black Productions for Atari founder Nolan Bushnell. During this period, he named and developed the entertainment segment Pizza Time Theater for Chuck E. Cheese.

In 1992, Black wrote and directed Let Them Run Free for the Starlight Starbright Children's Foundation to benefit terminally ill children. Later, Black received the Mercury Award for his work on Holland America Cruise Line/Westours. His work has won Clio, Cannes Lions, Mobius Gold, Andys, Addys, and Best of Show awards. He was nominated by the Directors' Guild of America for "Outstanding Directorial Achievement in Commercials."

In 1999, Black directed episode 7 of season 1 of the ABC television drama Once and Again, titled "The Ex-Files", starring Sela Ward and Billy Campbell.

Black began filming a documentary titled Borrowing Time in 2000, which he partially funded. This project later evolved into a feature documentary titled Loving Henri (2016).
