= Stanley Beck =

American actor (born 1936)

- Born: June 5, 1936 (age 90); New York City, New York, U.S.
- Occupations: Actor and film producer

Stanley Beck (born June 5, 1936) is an American film producer and actor in stage, television, and film. As an actor, he is best known for his portrayal of Stanly in the 1969 film John and Mary and Artie Silver in the 1974 film Lenny. He has produced three films during his career, Straight Time (1978), Death Valley (1982), and Man, Woman and Child (1983).

A life member of The Actors Studio, Beck made three notable stage appearances, in rapid succession: two Arthur Miller premieres, Incident at Vichy (1964) and After The Fall (1964), as well as the revival of Eugene O'Neill's Marco Millions (1964). Another notable portrayal was that of Ed Busby in the premiere of William Snyder's The Days and Nights of BeeBee Fenstermaker (1962).

== Filmography ==
Year	Title	Role	Notes
1965	Who Killed Teddy Bear	Sutter	
1969	John and Mary	Ernest	
1974	Lenny	Artie Silver	(final film role)
