= True Confessions (novel) =

1977 novel by John Gregory Dunne

- First edition
- Author: John Gregory Dunne
- Genre: Noir
- Publisher: E. P. Dutton
- Publication date: 1977
- Publication place: United States
- Pages: 341
- ISBN: 1560258152

True Confessions is a noir novel by John Gregory Dunne and published in 1977. The novel was inspired by an actual event, the still unsolved murder of Elizabeth Ann Short, the Black Dahlia (Boston, July 29, 1924 – Los Angeles, January 15, 1947).

== Plot ==
In Los Angeles in 1946, Lois Fazenda is found cut in two pieces in a vacant lot. After acquiring the nickname The Virgin Tramp in the media, her murder becomes a source of great public interest. Tom Spellacy is a lieutenant of the Homicide Division in charge of the case. His brother Demond is a skillful and quickly ascending monsignor who has already been chosen to become the next bishop. Tom's investigation threatens to expose links between the church, city elites, and a prostitution ring.

== Main characters ==
- Lieutenant Tom Spellacy
- Monsignor Desmond Spellacy
- Lois Fazenda, prostitute and victim of the crime
- Jack Amsterdam, mob-connected developer in business with the Los Angeles Archdiocese
- Lieutenant Frank Crotty, colleague and friend of Tom Spellacy
- Cardinal Hugh Danaher, head of the Archdiocese, of whom Des Spellacy is the secretary and designated successor
- Mary Margaret Maher Spellacy, wife of Tom Spellacy
- Corinne Morris, lover of Tom Spellacy
- Monsignor Seamus Fargo, honest and uncompromising priest, disliked by his superiors
- Dan T. Campion, lawyer of the Archdiocese
- Sonny McDonough, Los Angeles Construction Councilor and mortician in business with the Archdiocese
- Brenda Samuels, brothel-keeper, friend of Tom Spellacy
- Captain Fred Fuqua, chief of the Homicide Division, superior of Tom Spellacy and aspiring chief of the LAPD
- Howard Terkel, journalist

== Reception ==
True Confessions was a New York Times Best Seller. Novelist Thomas H. Cook included True Confessions among his list of 10 best mystery books, calling it "one of the most movingly redemptive novels I have ever read."

In a 2019 interview, author James Ellroy recommended True Confessions as one of the top three American noir novels ever written, besides his own

== Adaptation ==
The novel was adapted into the 1981 film True Confessions, directed by Ulu Grosbard and starring Robert De Niro and Robert Duvall. Dunne co-wrote the screenplay with his wife Joan Didion.
