= Mort Crim =

American retired broadcast journalist and author

Mort Crim (born July 31, 1935) is an American author and former broadcast journalist. Crim joined Channel 4 (WWJ-TV, soon thereafter to be renamed WDIV-TV) in Detroit in 1978. Crim stayed with the station 19 years before retiring from anchoring TV newscasts in 1997. Previously, he served as an anchor at WHAS-TV in Louisville (1969-1972), KYW-TV in Philadelphia (1972-1977) and WBBM-TV in Chicago (1977-1978). Crim was considered to be a top candidate by former ABC News president Roone Arledge to be a co-anchor for ABC's World News Tonight newscast in 1978. In 1984, he hosted a technology program on PBS, New Tech Times. Crim is also the founder of a Detroit-area integrated marketing agency, Mort Crim Communications, Inc., which has since operated under new ownership. Crim served as a spokesman for Majic Window Company in Wixom, Michigan, and for several years was featured in television commercials for that company.

Crim anchored the American Information Network (ABC) program News Around The World in the late 1960s and early 1970s, as well as many other hourly newscasts.

In addition to his anchoring duties, Mort Crim has four syndicated editorial and news features for radio: One Moment Please (originally a television feature), News You'll Care About (a five-minute news summary), Second Thoughts and American Spirit. He was also previously a substitute anchor for Paul Harvey's daily radio programs.

Crim read the eulogy at news colleague Jessica Savitch's memorial service, following her 1983 death. The two had co-anchored together at KYW-TV in Philadelphia in the mid-1970s.

Crim contributed an intro monologue to The White Stripes' song "Little Acorns", from their 2003 album Elephant.

Crim remains active as a keynote speaker, addressing conventions and conferences across the country. He is the author of seven books and has recently completed his eighth, a memoir. He also writes and produces television documentaries—his most recent, Flight Level Seven Four and Still Climbing, an account of the solo cross-country flight he made in his light sport aircraft to celebrate his 74th birthday.

In February 2007, Crim was diagnosed with colon cancer. According to his doctors at Mayo Clinic, the cancer was caught early and Crim made a full recovery.

The Broadcast Pioneers of Philadelphia inducted Crim into their Hall of Fame in 2009. He also has been inducted into the Michigan and Illinois broadcast halls of fame and Northwestern University's Hall of Achievement.

Crim earned his master's degree in journalism from Northwestern University's Medill School of Journalism. He is the recipient of five honorary doctorates.

In a 2013 interview, actor/comedian Will Ferrell revealed that Crim was the main inspiration for his popular TV news anchor character Ron Burgundy.

Between 2017 and 2018 Crim appeared as himself in 12 episodes of the Comedy Central series Detroiters.

In September 2023, he narrated a minute-long teaser video promoting singer-songwriter Olivia Rodrigo’s sophomore studio album Guts.
