= Almost Golden: The Jessica Savitch Story =

Television film directed by Peter Werner

- Written by: Linda Bergman
- Directed by: Peter Werner
- Starring: Sela Ward; Ron Silver; Judith Ivey; Jeffrey DeMunn
- Music by: David Shire
- Country of origin: United States
- Original language: English

Production
- Executive producer: Bernard Sofronski
- Cinematography: Neil Roach
- Editor: Martin Nicholson
- Running time: 120 minutes
- Production companies: ABC Productions; Bernard Sofronski Productions

Original release
- Network: Lifetime
- Release: September 4, 1995

Almost Golden: The Jessica Savitch Story is a 1995 American biographical drama television film directed by Peter Werner and written by Linda Bergman. It stars Sela Ward as a television journalist Jessica Savitch. The film premiered on Lifetime on September 4, 1995.

The film received mixed reviews from television critics, but was nominated for a Primetime Emmy Award for Outstanding Television Movie. It was Lifetime's most-watched original movie with 7.1 million viewers.

== Cast ==
- Sela Ward as Jessica Savitch
- Ron Silver as Ron Kershaw
- Judith Ivey as Laura McCormick
- Jeffrey DeMunn as Mel Korn
- William Converse-Roberts as Donald
- Sean McCann
- Randy Means as Terry Wills
- Jason Blicker as Adam Murphy
- Chuck Shamata as Al Binder
- Maruska Stankova as Lilyan Wilder
- Jeff Pustil as Jody Simons
- Lawrence Dane as Emmertz Canterbury
- John Bolger as Martin Fishbein
- Dini Petty as Lillie Werner
- Damir Andrei as Buddy Savitch
- Kathryn Skatula as Florence Savitch
- Michael J. Reynolds as Ken Green
- Brett Halsey as Paul Laxalt

== Accolades ==
Award	Category	Recipient(s)	Result	Ref
48th Primetime Emmy Awards	Outstanding Television Movie		Nominated	
48th Primetime Emmy Awards	Outstanding Lead Actress in a Miniseries or a Special	Sela Ward	Nominated	
48th Primetime Emmy Awards	Outstanding Individual Achievement in Directing for a Miniseries or a Special	Peter Werner	Nominated	
2nd Screen Actors Guild Awards	Outstanding Performance by a Female Actor in a Miniseries or Television Movie	Sela Ward	Nominated	
CableACE Awards	Actress in a Movie or Miniseries	Sela Ward	Won	
48th Directors Guild of America Awards	Outstanding Directing – Miniseries or TV Film	Peter Werner	Nominated	
