= John and Mary (film) =

1969 film by Peter Yates

- Directed by: Peter Yates
- Screenplay by: John Mortimer
- Based on: John and Mary; 1966 novel by Mervyn Jones
- Produced by: Ben Kadish
- Starring: Dustin Hoffman; Mia Farrow
- Cinematography: Gayne Rescher
- Edited by: Frank P. Keller
- Music by: Quincy Jones
- Distributed by: 20th Century Fox
- Release date: December 14, 1969 (US)
- Running time: 92 minutes
- Country: United States
- Language: English
- Budget: $3.5 million
- Box office: $4.1 million (US/ Canada rentals) (Note: Please note figures are rentals accruing to distributors and not total gross.)

John and Mary is a 1969 American romantic drama film directed by Peter Yates (directly following the success of his film Bullitt), and starring Dustin Hoffman and Mia Farrow in the title roles (directly following their successes in Midnight Cowboy and Rosemary's Baby, respectively). It was the film debut of Tyne Daly. The screenplay was adapted by John Mortimer from the 1966 Mervyn Jones novel.

== Plot ==
John and Mary begins the morning after John and Mary meet in a bar, during a conversation about Jean-Luc Godard's Weekend, and go home with each other. The story unfolds during the day as they belatedly get to know each other over breakfast, lunch and dinner. Flashbacks of their previous bad relationships are interspersed throughout when something in their conversation brings the thought up.

== Cast ==
- Mia Farrow as Mary
- Dustin Hoffman as John
- Michael Tolan as James
- Olympia Dukakis as John's Mother
- Stanley Beck as Ernest
- Tyne Daly as Hillary

== Release ==
The film premiered at the Sutton Theatre in New York City on Sunday, December 14, 1969, and opened the following day. It received an R rating upon its original release, but was re-rated PG in 1973.

In February 1969, before the release of the film, both Hoffman and Farrow made the cover of Time, with the headline: "The Young Actors: Stars and Anti-Stars". This marked and celebrated new actors like Hoffman and Farrow (both hot off their successes in The Graduate and Rosemary's Baby, respectively) as significant to their generation.

=== Critical reception ===
Roger Ebert of the Chicago Sun-Times wrote, "John and Mary is supposed to be a contemporary movie, I guess, and yet it's curiously out of touch. John and Mary shadow box uneasily with the American language, trying to sound like all people their age without sounding too much like any particular person."

Vincent Canby of The New York Times wrote, "There is nothing wrong with the idea of 'John and Mary,' just with its execution. John Mortimer's screenplay is short-focused, its action confined mostly to John's apartment where John and Mary eat, talk and lie about with such dreary verisimilitude that you eventually find yourself less interested in John and Mary than in the settings, clothes and objects that surround them." Canby also included the movie in his list of “ten worst films of 1969” for the paper: “The settings and some of the subsidiary dialogue have an edgy kind of truth to them, but the characters are too inconsistently written to allow the stars to give performances that mean anything.”

Rotten Tomatoes reports an approval rating of 38%, based on 13 reviews.

=== Box office ===
According to Fox records, the film required $6,300,000 in rentals to break even, and by December 11, 1970, it had made $8,150,000, resulting in a profit to the studio.

=== Awards ===
Won:

- 1970 BAFTA Award, Best Actor – Dustin Hoffman (For Midnight Cowboy and John and Mary)

Nominated:

- 1970 BAFTA Award, Best Actress – Mia Farrow (For: Rosemary's Baby, Secret Ceremony and John and Mary)
- 1970 Golden Globes, Best Actor, Musical/Comedy – Dustin Hoffman
- 1970 Golden Globes, Best Actress, Musical/Comedy – Mia Farrow
- 1970 Golden Globes, Best Screenplay – John Mortimer
- 1970 WGA Awards, Best Adapted Screenplay – John Mortimer

== Musical score and soundtrack ==
John and Mary

Soundtrack album by Quincy Jones
- Released: 1970
- Recorded: 1969
- Genre: Film score
- Length: 31:10
- Label: A&M; SP-4230
- Producer: Quincy Jones

Quincy Jones chronology
| Cactus Flower (1969) | John and Mary (1970) | Gula Matari (1970) |

The film score was composed, arranged and conducted by Quincy Jones, and the soundtrack, featuring vocalists Evie Sands, The Strange Things, Jeff Bridges, The Morgan Ames Singers and four classical pieces performed by a brass ensemble, was released on the A&M label in 1970.

=== Track listing ===
All compositions by Quincy Jones except where noted

1. "Maybe Tomorrow (Vocal)" (Lyrics by Alan and Marilyn Bergman) − 3:10
2. "Bump in the Night" − 1:58
3. "Lost in Space" (Jeff Bridges) − 3:15
4. "Silent Movies" − 2:11
5. "Maybe Tomorrow" (Lyrics by Alan and Marilyn Bergman) − 4:18
6. "Main Title" − 2:48
7. "22nd Fugue for Well-Tempered Clavichord" (Johann Sebastian Bach) − 1:31
8. "Rondo No. 1" (Wolfgang Amadeus Mozart) − 1:58
9. "Opus 54, Variations Serieuses" (Felix Mendelssohn) − 2:05
10. "Allegro from Royal Fireworks Suite" (George Frideric Handel) − 3:58
11. "Maybe Tomorrow" − 3:58

=== Personnel ===
- Unidentified orchestra arranged and conducted by Quincy Jones
- Evie Sands (track 1), The Strange Things (track 2), Jeff Bridges (track 3), The Morgan Ames Singers (track 5) − vocals
- The John and Mary Brass Ensemble (tracks 7–11)

== See also ==
- List of American films of 1969
