= The Studio (book) =

1969 nonfiction book by John Gregory Dunne

- First edition
- Author: John Gregory Dunne
- Language: English
- Subject: 20th Century Fox
- Genre: Investigative journalism
- Publisher: Farrar, Straus and Giroux
- Publication date: 1969
- Publication place: United States
- Media type: Print (hardcover and paperback)
- Pages: 255
- ISBN: 0374271127

The Studio is a 1969 nonfiction book by John Gregory Dunne about the workings at 20th Century Fox from May 1967 to May 1968. He was allowed significant access to the studio over that period of time.

According to Dunne's obituary in the Los Angeles Times, the resulting book "is regarded as one of the most detailed and accurate reports on the workings of a major film studio ever written."

It covers such aspects as:

- the test screening and marketing of Doctor Doolittle
- the making of Star!, The Planet of the Apes, The Sweet Ride
- the scripting of The Boston Strangler

People who appear in the book include Richard Zanuck, Darryl F. Zanuck, Gene Kelly, Paul Monash, Joe Pasternak, Pandro Berman.

Joyce Haber of the Los Angeles Times said "Dunne's observations are right on the button, his descriptions are spare but evocative, his observations combine substance with humor." In 1969, Charles Champlin called it "the hottest book in movie circles these days". The New York Times said the book was full "of the most awful scenes."
