= Alanna Nash =

American journalist and biographer

- Born: August 16, 1950 (age 76); Louisville, Kentucky, U.S.
- Education: Stephens College; Columbia University Graduate School of Journalism
- Occupations: Journalist; biographer

Alanna Kay Nash (born August 16, 1950) is an American journalist and biographer.

Born in Louisville, Kentucky, Nash holds a master's degree from the Columbia University Graduate School of Journalism and is the author of several acclaimed books. She is a 1972 graduate of Stephens College. A feature writer for The New York Times, Stereo Review, Entertainment Weekly, and USA Weekend, she was named the Society of Professional Journalists' National Member of the Year in 1994. In 1977, Nash's job afforded her the opportunity to become one of the journalists to view the remains of Elvis Presley. In her dust jacket biography for her book Baby, Let's Play House, she was described as "the first journalist to see Elvis Presley in his casket".

Nash's much-reprinted 1978 biography of Dolly Parton included material gathered from a long interview with its subject, that took place over the course of several days. The biography, Dolly, was published just as Parton reached mainstream appeal outside of the country music world, via her now-famous pop-music crossover. Nash has closely followed Parton's career since, having also written numerous magazine articles about her and reviewing a number of Parton's albums.

== Other projects ==
In 1988, Nash received acclaim for her book on Jessica Savitch, Golden Girl: The Story of Jessica Savitch, which was the basis for the 1996 motion picture Up Close & Personal, as well as a made-for-television movie named Almost Golden. In the 1990s Nash began researching the life of Elvis Presley in order to write a book. Although there were already several hundred Presley books on the market, her 1995 book, Elvis Aaron Presley: Revelations from the Memphis Mafia, provided what Entertainment Weekly called "stunning allegations". As a result of Nash being able to get the collaboration of employees Marty Lacker, Lamar Fike, and Presley's first cousin, Billy Smith who lived and worked with Presley throughout his life, she provided a look at Presley not previously published.

== Colonel Tom Parker ==
Her research into Presley led to a second book on Colonel Tom Parker. While covering Presley's death, Alanna Nash had seen what most of the throng of reporters there at the time considered as somewhat bizarre decorum by Parker when he came to the funeral dressed in a Hawaiian shirt and baseball cap. For her 1995 book, Nash had interviewed Colonel Parker but her examination into his life kept unfolding with so many twists and turns that it led to six years of exhaustive research including travel to his birthplace Breda in the Netherlands for documents and interviews. Her book, The Colonel: The Extraordinary Story of Colonel Tom Parker and Elvis Presley, was published on July 15, 2003, to acclaim. Billboard called it a "classic of music industry reporting". Other positive reviews came from The Washington Post, The New York Review of Books, Variety, and Publishers Weekly, among others. In the UK, Mojo music magazine said her book was "the most incisive and comprehensive look at the life of the elusive Colonel available" and the reviewer for The Observer lauded the book as "perhaps the most thoroughly researched music book ever written" — before adding that "sadly most of the story has been told before. Nash simply adds layer after layer of padding."

For her reporting on Colonel Parker, Nash was voted one of the "Heavy 100 of Country Music" by Esquire magazine and earned the 2004 CMA Media Achievement Award and the 2004 Belmont Book Award. She has reviewed for Stereo Review magazine, Reader's Digest, and Amazon.com as well as others.

== Bibliography ==
- Nash, Alanna (2010). Baby, let's play house: Elvis Presley and the women who loved him. New York: HarperCollins. ISBN 978-0-06-169985-6. OCLC 574188462.
- —————— (2004). The Colonel: the extraordinary story of Colonel Tom Parker and Elvis Presley. Chicago: Simon & Schuster. ISBN 1-55652-546-X. OCLC 56528231.
- —————— (2002). Behind closed doors: talking with the legends of country music. New York: Cooper Square Press. ISBN 0-8154-1258-4. OCLC 51480549.
- ——————; Billy Smith; Marty Lacker; Lamar Fike (1995). Elvis Aaron Presley: revelations from the Memphis Mafia. New York: HarperCollins. ISBN 0-06-017619-9. OCLC 32050696.
- —————— (1996). Golden girl: the story of Jessica Savitch. New York: E. P. Dutton. ISBN 0-06-101001-4. OCLC 34233327.
- —————— (2002). Dolly: the biography. New York: Random House. ISBN 0-8154-1242-8. OCLC 50677030.
