= Mervyn Jones (writer) =

British novelist, journalist and biographer

- Born: 27 February 1922; Regent's Park, London, England
- Died: 23 February 2010 (aged 87)
- Education: Abbotsholme School
- Alma mater: New York University
- Occupation: Writer
- Spouse: Jeanne Urquhart (1948–1990)
- Children: 3
- Relatives: Ernest Jones (father)
- Writing career
- Notable works: John and Mary, Holding On, Today The Struggle

Mervyn Jones (27 February 1922 – 23 February 2010) was a British novelist, journalist and biographer, the son of psychoanalyst Ernest Jones.

Mervyn Jones wrote 29 novels (five unpublished), including John and Mary (1966), the basis for the 1969 film, and Holding On (1973), which was adapted for television in 1977.

Jones also wrote non-fiction, reportage and biography, including a fictional biography of Joseph Stalin in 1970 and a biography of his friend Michael Foot, the former Labour Party leader, in 1994. A former Communist, Jones wrote for the Daily Worker, and later the New Reasoner and Tribune; he was later assistant editor at the New Statesman.

He died in 2010 at age 87.

== Selected works ==
=== Fiction ===
- No Time To Be Young (1952)
- The New Town (1953)
- Helen Blake (1955)
- On the Last Day (1958)
- A Set of Wives (1965)
- John and Mary (1966)
- A Survivor (1968)
- Joseph (1970)
- Mr Armitage Isn't Back Yet (1971)
- Holding On (1973; new edition by Eland in 2009)
- The Revolving Door (1973)
- Strangers (1974)
- Lord Richard's Passion (1974)
- Twilight of the Day (1975)
- The Pursuit of Happiness (1975)
- Scenes From Bourgeois Life (1976)
- Nobody's Fault (1977)
- Today The Struggle (1978)
- The Beautiful Words (1979)
- A Short Time To Live (1980)
- Two Women and Their Man (1982)
- Joanna's Luck (1984)
- Coming Home (1986)
- That Year in Paris (1988)

=== Non-fiction ===
- Guilty Men (1957) [with Michael Foot]
- Potbank: A Social Enquiry into Life in the Potteries (1961)
- Big Two: Life in America and Russia (1962) [aka The Antagonists]
- Two Ears of Corn – Oxfam in Action (1965) [aka In Famine's Shadow – a Private War on Hunger]
- Kingsley Martin: Portrait and Self-portrait (1969) [Ed.]
- Rhodesia: The White Judge's Burden (1972)
- Life on the Dole (1972)
- Privacy (1974)
- The Oil Rush (1976)
- Chances: An Autobiography (1987)
- A Radical Life: The Biography of Megan Lloyd George (1991)
- Michael Foot (1994)
- The Amazing Victorian: A Life of George Meredith (1999)
