= William Snyder (playwright) =

American dramatist

William Hartwell Snyder Jr. (August 30, 1929 – March 12, 2008) was an American playwright and a longtime faculty member of the theatre department at the University of Tennessee at Martin. He is best known for his play The Days and Nights of BeeBee Fenstermaker.

== Biography ==
Snyder attended Yale University's School of Drama where he earned a master of fine arts degree in playwrighting. While there the school mounted a production of his play A True And Special Friend in 1956 with a cast including Jonathan Frid.

In 1962 Snyder's play The Days and Nights of BeeBee Fenstermaker premiered Off-Broadway at the Sheridan Square Playhouse with Rose Gregorio in the title role and Robert Duvall as Bob Smith. Received with critical praise, the play ran for a total of 304 performances. The work was later adapted by Snyder into two television films, one in English for British ATV drama with Patricia Neal as BeeBee and one in German for German television with Loni von Friedl in the title role. Also in 1962, Snyder produced Garson Kanin's play A Gift of Time for its debut on Broadway at the Ethel Barrymore Theatre where it ran for 94 performances. The cast notably included Olivia de Havilland, Henry Fonda, and Joseph Campanella; the latter of which garnered a Tony Award nomination for his performance in the play.

In 1964 Snyder joined the faculty at the University of Tennessee at Martin. He taught a variety of theatre subjects, including acting, playwrighting, and directing during his 32 years at the university. For most of his tenure at the university, he was director of the UT Martin Vanguard Theatre; notably directing somewhere between 150 and 200 productions at the university during his career. In 1990 he was awarded the highest honor bestowed on faculty members by the university, the University of Tennessee National Alumni Association Distinguished Professor award. After his retirement in 1996 he moved to Oregon. He died twelve years later at the age of 78 due to complications from Alzheimer's disease.
