= Monster: Living Off the Big Screen =

1997 nonfiction book by John Gregory Dunne

- First edition
- Author: John Gregory Dunne
- Language: English
- Subject: American film industry
- Genre: Memoir
- Publisher: Random House
- Publication date: 1997
- Publication place: United States
- Media type: Print (hardcover and paperback)
- Pages: 203
- ISBN: 0679455795

Monster: Living Off the Big Screen is a nonfiction book by John Gregory Dunne published in 1997. The book recounts Dunne's experiences as a screenwriter in Hollywood, particularly the process of drafting the screenplay for Up Close & Personal (1996), a movie starring Robert Redford and Michelle Pfeiffer. It details the meetings, writing, rewriting and all the other struggles in the way of creating a sellable screenplay. In the book, Dunne claims that Up Close & Personal started off as a biopic about television journalist Jessica Savitch, only to end up being a Star Is Born-type film, where one character is a "rising star", and the person she/he is in love with becomes a "falling star".

== Critical reception ==
The Guardian called Monster "among the funniest, cruellest and most 'New York' takes on the fate of writers in the Hollywood system. Contemptuous of so much of what he saw, yet unwilling to detach himself from his own role in the process, which turned a dark, amoral tale of psychological disintegration into a feel-good vehicle for Robert Redford, Dunne wrote a classic."
