= Up Close & Personal (film) =

1996 film directed by Jon Avnet

- Theatrical release poster
- Directed by: Jon Avnet
- Written by: Joan Didion; John Gregory Dunne
- Based on: Golden Girl: The Story of Jessica Savitch by Alanna Nash
- Produced by: Jon Avnet; Jordan Kerner; David Nicksay
- Starring: Robert Redford; Michelle Pfeiffer; Stockard Channing; Joe Mantegna; Kate Nelligan; Glenn Plummer; James Rebhorn
- Cinematography: Karl Walter Lindenlaub
- Edited by: Debra Neil-Fisher
- Music by: Thomas Newman
- Production companies: Touchstone Pictures; Cinergi Pictures; Avnet/Kerner Productions
- Distributed by: Buena Vista Pictures Distribution (North America/South America); Cinergi Productions (International, via Summit Entertainment)
- Release date: March 1, 1996
- Running time: 124 minutes
- Country: United States
- Language: English
- Budget: $60 million
- Box office: $100.7 million

Up Close & Personal is a 1996 American romantic drama film directed by Jon Avnet from a screenplay written by Joan Didion and John Gregory Dunne. It stars Robert Redford as a news director and Michelle Pfeiffer as his protégée, with Stockard Channing, Joe Mantegna, and Kate Nelligan in supporting roles.

The screenplay began as an adaptation of Golden Girl: The Story of Jessica Savitch, a 1988 book by Alanna Nash that recounted the troubled life of American news anchor Jessica Savitch. The finished picture, however, was greatly altered by commercial decisions on the part of the producers, and bore little resemblance to Savitch's biography. Dunne, having spent eight years working on the script with his wife Didion, later wrote a book describing his difficult experience, titled Monster: Living Off the Big Screen.

"Because You Loved Me", the film's theme song written by Diane Warren and performed by Celine Dion, was nominated for Best Original Song at the 69th Academy Awards.

== Plot ==
Aspiring news anchor Tally Atwater makes a demo tape of a fake story and is hired by Miami station manager Warren Justice. Though she lacks polish and experience, Warren sees promise in Tally and decides to give her a chance, giving her tough love assignments to foster her talent. After a well-done news story about two immigrants who drowned off the shores of Miami Beach, Tally and Warren form an even closer mentor/mentee friendship built upon mutual respect and simmering attraction. On New Year’s Eve, Tally covers the first locally-born baby of the year, a child by convicted felon Fernando Buttanda. A heated exchange occurs on air between Tally and the lead male anchor. She confronts the station's perception that she is merely in her position because she is Warren’s “protégée” and threatens to quit.

Tally tracks down and meets with talent agent Bucky Terranova, who takes her on as a client and lands her a position as a reporter in Philadelphia, a much larger market. Due to her impending departure, Tally decides to confront her feelings for Warren. The two end up physically consummating their emotional relationship, including a getaway to the Florida Keys before Tally’s move to Philadelphia.

Tally struggles at her new post - largely due to hostile veteran reporter Marcia McGrath, who jealously protects her position as top reporter - and starts to lose some of the charisma that initially captured Bucky’s attention. At Bucky's request, and out of affection for Tally, Warren visits her in Philadelphia and talks her through missteps she has taken by trying to emulate Marcia instead of being herself. Encouraged by Warren, Tally begins to perform to her previous standards, leading Marcia to accept an offer from a station in Cincinnati, thus handing the position to Tally. Tally asks Warren to marry her and relocate to Philadelphia so that they can be together. On their honeymoon they come up with a story idea that looks at a “day in the life” of Fernando, who has been relocated to a Philadelphia prison. During this time, Warren’s backstory is revealed as he attempts to find a job in order to remain close to Tally.

While filming the segment at the prison, a prison riot occurs wherein Tally and her cameraman Ned Jackson are taken hostage. Tally covers the volatile and groundbreaking story from within the prison walls as Warren looks on from outside, guiding her through her first national broadcast. As the story uncovers, she fulfills the potential that Warren initially saw in her. Her poise and bravery leads to an evening anchor position with the nationally-broadcast IBS News. While relaying the job offer to Warren, she discovers that he senses a developing story in Panama that he intends to cover. Warren tells Tally that she inspired him to want more, including possibly returning to journalism. Sadly, during Tally’s going away party at the Philadelphia station, it is reported that Warren and his crew were fired upon after wrapping up their story, resulting in Warren's death.

The movie ends with Tally discussing the purpose of journalism. In a touching tribute, she notes that Warren had a hunch, followed it, and ultimately got the story.

== Cast ==
- Robert Redford as Warren Justice
- Michelle Pfeiffer as Sally "Tally" Atwater
- Stockard Channing as Marcia McGrath
- Joe Mantegna as Bucky Terranova
- Kate Nelligan as Joanna Kennelly
- Glenn Plummer as Ned Jackson
- James Rebhorn as John Merino
- Scott Bryce as Rob Sullivan
- Raymond Cruz as Fernando Buttanda
- Dedee Pfeiffer as Luanne Atwater
- Miguel Sandoval as Dan Duarte
- Noble Willingham as Buford Sells
- James Karen as Tom Orr
- Brian Markinson as Vic Nash
- Fabian Forte as himself

== Adaptation ==
In the spring of 1988, John Gregory Dunne and Joan Didion began writing the script for a film entitled Golden Girl, based on Alanna Nash's biography of the late NBC News anchor and reporter Jessica Savitch and financed by The Walt Disney Company. When the film was finally released in 1996, eight years later, it was known as Up Close & Personal and none of the more controversial details of Savitch's life remained, including her alleged drug abuse problems that may have caused her to deliver an incoherent live news update on national television in early October 1983. Other details omitted from the film included the suicide of Savitch's second husband a few months after their wedding, and her alleged bisexuality, suicide attempts and physical abuse by her longtime partner Ron Kershaw, a well-known news director who was the original model for the character of Warren Justice. Savitch's death at age 36 in an automobile accident (unrelated to drugs or alcohol) was also left out of the screenplay.

According to Dunne, who chronicled his experiences dealing with studio executives in his book Monster: Living Off the Big Screen, the majority of these changes were made in order to appeal to a broader mainstream market. Producer Scott Rudin was reported to have said, when asked by a weary Dunne what the film was supposed to be, "it's about two movie stars."

== Production ==
Pfeiffer and Redford got on very well during the production. Pfeiffer later stated that "Bob is every bit the leading man he has always been. He's every bit as charming and I think he's even more interesting and better looking now that he has a little age on him. He was too handsome when he was younger." Redford declared that it was a "pleasure to work with Michelle".

== Reception ==
On Rotten Tomatoes Up Close & Personal holds an approval rating of 32% based on 37 reviews, with an average rating of 5.2/10. The site's consensus states: "Up Close & Personal wastes its superstar leads and compelling fact-inspired story on a treacly romance bereft of onscreen chemistry." Audiences surveyed by CinemaScore gave the film a grade "A−" on scale of A to F.

Critics largely ridiculed the screenplay for bearing little resemblance to the biography of Jessica Savitch, which was supposed to have inspired it. Roger Ebert in the Chicago Sun-Times wrote: "Up Close and Personal is so different from the facts of Savitch's life that if Didion and Dunne still have their first draft, they probably could sell it as a completely different movie." Anita Gates in the New York Times wrote that "it all ends up more A Star Is Born than Network." Leonard Klady in Variety described it as "A Star Is Born meets The Way We Were, and while discerning audiences will turn their noses up, the hoi polloi are apt to embrace this unabashedly sentimental affair and send it soaring into the box office stratosphere."

Desson Howe in The Washington Post was extremely negative about the film: "Up Close and Personal, which was "suggested" by the Jessica Savitch biography, Golden Girl: The Story of Jessica Savitch, starts out with relative promise... but then, the loooove comes through like a bad-news feed, and our marquee lovers undergo one of those unbearable montages. While an insipid, rock ballad covers the proceedings with auditory treacle, Cushion Lips (Michelle Pfeiffer) and Armchair Man (Robert Redford) walk together, laugh together, frolic in the waves with their clothes on – that sort of thing.... In this movie, network executives – who depend entirely on focus groups, marketing and advertisers to inform their decisions – are painted as the moral bad guys, while Redford and the emerging Pfeiffer are the embodiment of integrity... And the fact that this is a Touchstone Pictures production – part of the marketing-obsessed, truth-sweetening Disney empire which just purchased ABC – is far too hilarious an irony to ignore." Time Out called it a "soppy May–December romance masquerading as a deadly earnest issues movie... Blow-dried, bleached blonde-on-bland entertainment."

However, certain critics argued that the film had its merits. Mick LaSalle in the San Francisco Chronicle wrote: "Taken on its own terms, Up Close and Personal is a fine movie. Two star images meet and enhance each other. Redford, as usual, plays a rugged, outdoorsy, uncompromising man of unshakable integrity who just happens to be news director at a Miami station. Pfeiffer, as usual, is gorgeous, pretty, gawky and a lot tougher and smarter than she looks." Roger Ebert gave the film three out of four stars, arguing that the "temptations are great to mock the clichés and melodrama in Up Close and Personal, but the movie undeniably works as what it really is - a love story." Variety praised the "chemistry" of Michelle Pfeiffer and Robert Redford, and the "delicious and brief star turns" of Stockard Channing, Kate Nelligan and Noble Willingham, concluding that the film wasn't "as accomplished as its inspiration but, regrettably, it's the best Hollywood has to offer in the heartstring-pulling genre."

=== Accolades ===
Award	Category	Nominee(s)	Result	Ref.
Academy Awards	Best Original Song	"Because You Loved Me"; Music and Lyrics by Diane Warren	Nominated	
ASCAP Film and Television Music Awards	Most Performed Songs from Motion Pictures	"Because You Loved Me"; Music and Lyrics by Diane Warren	Won	
Blockbuster Entertainment Awards	Favorite Supporting Actress – Romance	Stockard Channing	Won	
Golden Globe Awards	Best Original Song – Motion Picture	"Because You Loved Me"; Music and Lyrics by Diane Warren	Nominated	
Grammy Awards	Record of the Year	"Because You Loved Me" – Celine Dion and David Foster	Nominated	
Grammy Awards	Song of the Year	"Because You Loved Me" – Diane Warren	Nominated	
Grammy Awards	Best Female Pop Vocal Performance	"Because You Loved Me" – Celine Dion	Nominated	
Grammy Awards	Best Song Written Specifically for a Motion Picture or for Television	"Because You Loved Me" – Diane Warren	Won	
Online Film & Television Association Awards	Best Original Song	"Because You Loved Me"; Music and Lyrics by Diane Warren	Nominated	

The film is recognized by American Film Institute in these lists:

- 2004: AFI's 100 Years...100 Songs:
  - "Because You Loved Me" – Nominated
