= Incident at Vichy =

1964 play by Arthur Miller

First edition cover

Incident at Vichy is a one-act play written in 1964 by American dramatist Arthur Miller. It depicts a group of men who have been detained in Vichy France in 1942; they are being held for their "racial" inspection by German military officers and Vichy French police. The play focuses on the subjects of human nature, guilt, fear, and complicity and examines how the Nazis were able to perpetrate the Holocaust with so little resistance. Miller said of Incident at Vichy, "What is dark if not unknown is the relationship between those who side with justice and their implication in the evil they oppose. [...] The good and the evil are not compartments but two elements of a transaction."

The play premiered on Broadway on December 3, 1964, at the ANTA Washington Square Theatre in New York City. The production closed on May 7, 1965, after 32 performances. The cast included Michael Strong as LeBeau, Stanley Beck as Bayard, Paul Mann as Marchand, and David J. Stewart as Monceau. A London production in 1966 at the Phoenix Theatre starred Alec Guinness, Anthony Quayle and Nigel Davenport.

Miller adapted the play for a 1973 television production directed by Stacy Keach and starring Andy Robinson, Burt Freed, Harris Yulin, Richard Jordan and René Auberjonois.

== Characters ==
- Lebeau, a painter
- Bayard, an electrician
- Marchand, a businessman
- Police Guard (French)
- Monceau, an actor
- Gypsy
- Waiter
- Boy
- Major (German Army)
- First Detective (French)
- Old Jew
- Second Detective (French)
- Leduc, a psychiatrist
- Police Captain (French)
- Von Berg, a prince (Austrian)
- Professor Hoffman (a Nazi)
- Ferrand, a café proprietor
- Four Prisoners

None of the characters in the play is referred to by name at any time, except for Von Berg and Ferrand.

== Synopsis and themes ==
The first half of the play revolves around the characters' struggle to accept why they are there. With few exceptions, notably the gypsy and Von Berg, all the detainees are Jewish, and most have fled to Vichy from the German-occupied northern half of France. Nevertheless, though they clearly grasp the reality and seriousness of their situation, they persist in allowing themselves a state of denial about the motivations for their arrests and the fate that awaits them. Lebeau, Monceau, and Marchand all grasp for explanations: "It must be a routine document check." Bayard, who may or may not be Jewish, is an outspoken Communist who warns the detainees about trains going to Nazi concentration camps in Germany and Poland and reports of mass killings. He enjoins the detainees to develop political consciousness to make an intellectual, albeit private, stand against the pressure of detention. "My faith is in the future; and the future is Socialist. ... They can't win. Impossible."

The second half of the play shows the various characters' reaction to their situation: Leduc, a psychoanalyst who is also a French veteran of the 1940 fighting against Germany, tries to rally the prisoners to attempt an escape. However, the other able-bodied prisoners prefer to hope for the best, rejecting Bayard's warnings.

In this way, the play's central lesson is how the Nazis were able to perpetrate the Holocaust, how they were able to get away with it for so long. The café proprietor Ferrand notably does nothing to intervene on behalf of his friend the Waiter with the interrogators. The main confrontation in the second half is between Leduc and the Major, a disabled veteran of the German Army, as Leduc tries to persuade the Major to let them go free. The Major resents his assignment, thinking it beneath the dignity of a regular Army officer, but ultimately resigns himself to it, feeling himself entrapped within the chain of command. Furthermore, he feels that whether he helps the detainees to escape is irrelevant: "There are no persons anymore." The future which the Major sees is an authoritarian mass society where human beings are insignificant.

In the 1964 version, there is no real attempt at escape on the part of the prisoners as a whole. At the end, Von Berg secures a free pass from the guards, but then attempts to give it to Leduc, volunteering his life to help Leduc escape. In the 1966 version there is a major escape attempt in the middle of the play, but it is thwarted by the unexpected appearance of the Major. Since the objective of the piece is to show how the Nazis managed to make the Holocaust happen, this escape attempt may be viewed as seriously undermining the play's theme.

A key theme within the play is the right of life. Toward the end of the play, the major returns to the stage intoxicated and discusses the moral implications of what is going on in Germany. The major is under the gun of those above him in the chain of command and if he does not carry out the commands of his superiors he too will be on the chopping block and the execution of Jews will continue and the paradox paralyzes those who have a moral compass and value their own lives.

Ultimately, Von Berg takes the action risking his own freedom to offer a single Jew a chance at escape.

== Revivals ==
The play received its first professional New York revival in the spring of 2009 by the Off-Broadway group The Actors Company Theatre (TACT).

The first professional revival of Incident At Vichy was produced by the Jewish Repertory Theater, a tier one Equity company, then located on 14th Street in 1981.

== See also ==
- Vel' d'Hiv Roundup, the mass arrest and deportation of Jews in Paris that took place around the time in which the play is set
- Drancy internment camp, where French detainees were temporarily housed en route to concentration camps
- Maurice Papon, who as prefect of Bordeaux was a significant collaborationist who helped administer "dejudaisation" in his region
- The Holocaust in art and literature
