= Who Is Harry Kellerman and Why Is He Saying Those Terrible Things About Me? =

1971 film by Ulu Grosbard

- Theatrical release poster
- Directed by: Ulu Grosbard
- Written by: Ulu Grosbard; Herb Gardner
- Produced by: Ulu Grosbard; Herb Gardner
- Starring: Dustin Hoffman; Dom DeLuise; Barbara Harris; Jack Warden; David Burns; Gabriel Dell
- Cinematography: Victor J. Kemper
- Edited by: Barry Malkin
- Music by: Shel Silverstein
- Production company: Cinema Center Films
- Distributed by: National General Pictures
- Release date: June 15, 1971
- Running time: 108 minutes
- Country: United States
- Language: English
- Box office: $229,644

Who Is Harry Kellerman and Why Is He Saying Those Terrible Things About Me? is a 1971 American comedy drama film directed by Ulu Grosbard and starring Dustin Hoffman.

It portrays a single day in the life of Georgie Soloway, played by Hoffman. Its narrative is stream of consciousness, with both comedy and drama.

== Plot ==
Georgie Soloway, a rich and successful rock music composer who lives in a penthouse apartment and seemingly has everything, begins to think he is losing his mind trying to track down a man named Harry Kellerman, who has been spreading outrageous lies about him. Women he has previously dated are now rejecting him after getting calls from the mysterious Harry, and he fantasizes about committing suicide by leaping off his balcony. Regular visits to his psychiatrist are not helping. At night, he struggles with insomnia, and can sleep only when his long-suffering accountant comes over and reads his earnings statements to him. When he does sleep, he again dreams about jumping to his death.

As Georgie tries to make sense of his life, he thinks back on his experiences. Although a love song writer, he has never had a successful, lasting relationship. His first love, Ruthie, broke up with him after he got her pregnant and she had to have an abortion. He later met a kind waitress named Gloria, who he also impregnated. He married Gloria and they had two children, but he cheated on her and she divorced him. More recently, he met Allison, an aging actress who had just failed an audition for a rock musical. Allison turned out to have a lot in common with him, including a failed marriage and thoughts of suicide. When he learns it is her birthday, he takes her for a ride in his private plane, and they spend a romantic evening together.

Georgie visits his aging father, Leonard, who runs a small restaurant and has always had a dream of opening a bigger place. Georgie asks him why he does not move elsewhere to open the large restaurant of his dreams with the checks Georgie has sent him, instead of always returning the checks. His father says he is starting to suffer the effects of arteriosclerosis, and that it is too late for him to open a new restaurant because he will soon die. Georgie flies over New York City in his private plane to look for the cemetery where his father said he wants to be buried. He calls both Ruthie and Allison from his plane on the sky phone. Neither woman recognizes his voice, though, so he hangs up, but not before revealing that he is Harry Kellerman.

At the end, Georgie is shown crashing his private plane into the buildings of Manhattan, but the scene cuts to the ski slopes, where he is cheerfully skiing with his psychiatrist.

== Cast ==
- Dustin Hoffman as Georgie Soloway
- Barbara Harris as Allison Densmore
- Jack Warden as Dr. Solomon F. Moses
- David Burns as Leon Soloway
- Dom DeLuise as Irwin Marcy
- Gabriel Dell as Sidney Gill
- Betty Walker as Margot Soloway
- Rose Gregorio as Gloria Soloway
- Ed Zimmerman as Peter Halloran
- Regina Baff as Ruthie Tresh
- David Galef as Leonard Soloway

== Production ==
Who Is Harry Kellerman and Why Is He Saying Those Terrible Things About Me? was filmed on location in New York City in 1970. Some of the locations include the Lunt-Fontanne Theater, the General Motors Building and Fillmore East. At the Fillmore East, Soloway performs onstage with Shel Silverstein and Dr. Hook & The Medicine Show. This scene was filmed September 18, 1970, prior to a Grateful Dead concert. The concert attendees were used as extras for the scene. The soundtrack was produced by Ron Haffkine.

== Release and reception ==
Roger Ebert of the Chicago Sun-Times gave the film three stars out of four, and wrote that the film's "failure to come to grips with the personal meaning of suicide is the fundamental reason 'Harry Kellerman' doesn't entirely succeed. There's a certain flabbiness in its philosophy. And yet (having gotten the thoughts about suicide off my chest), I reacted very favorably to some scenes in the film, and I think Hoffman's two long scenes with Barbara Harris are among the best cinema I've seen in some time. Miss Harris has earned an Academy Award nomination hands down."

Vincent Canby of The New York Times wrote, "It is very glib, very funny in short takes and rather tedious and predictable in long ones, and it virtually kills itself trying to convince us that life at the top is even more anxious, more empty, than is life at the bottom, or at the middle."

Arthur D. Murphy of Variety called the film "an artistic disappointment" with a "dull screenplay", noting that "entire reels could be interchanged without being evident".

Gene Siskel of the Chicago Tribune gave the film 1½ stars out of 4, and wrote, "There isn't much right about 'Harry Kellerman' ... Much of the dialog is too cute ('What should I do for reality; it never did anything for me.' 'If Shakespeare wrote music, they'd all be in the top 10.' 'Doctor, I came to you in flames, and you treated me for sunburn.') And when Dustin Hoffman can't deliver these lines smoothly, you know they are stilted."

Charles Champlin of the Los Angeles Times was positive, calling the film "a crackling and original work" with a "knockout performance by the admirable Mr. Hoffman".

Gary Arnold of The Washington Post panned the film as a "snow job of a movie" and "another empty vessel that flatters itself as a powerful comment on emptiness".

Nigel Andrews of The Monthly Film Bulletin wrote, "Ulu Grobard's film emerges as no more than an amorphous assemblage of smart ideas, whose shapelessness—in theory justified by Georgie's story being presented as reminiscences from an analyst's couch—in practice robs the film of any real dramatic momentum."

As Ebert correctly predicted, Barbara Harris received an Academy Award nomination for Best Supporting Actress.

== Home media ==
The film has been released on VHS, and was released on DVD by Paramount Home Entertainment January 28, 2014.
