= True Confessions (film) =

1981 crime film directed by Ulu Grosbard

- Theatrical release poster
- Directed by: Ulu Grosbard
- Written by: Joan Didion; John Gregory Dunne
- Based on: True Confessions by John Gregory Dunne
- Produced by: Robert Chartoff; Irwin Winkler
- Starring: Robert De Niro; Robert Duvall; Burgess Meredith; Charles Durning; Ed Flanders; Cyril Cusack; Kenneth McMillan
- Cinematography: Owen Roizman
- Edited by: Lynzee Klingman
- Music by: Georges Delerue
- Production company: Chartoff-Winkler Productions
- Distributed by: United Artists
- Release date: September 25, 1981
- Running time: 108 minutes
- Country: United States
- Language: English
- Budget: $10 million
- Box office: $12.9 million (domestic)

True Confessions is a 1981 American neo-noir crime drama film directed by Ulu Grosbard and starring Robert De Niro and Robert Duvall as the brothers Spellacy, a priest and police detective, respectively. Produced by Chartoff-Winkler Productions, it is adapted from the novel True Confessions by John Gregory Dunne, loosely based on the 1947 Black Dahlia murder case. Dunne wrote the screenplay with his wife, novelist Joan Didion. The film was released on September 25, 1981, receiving generally positive reviews from critics.

== Plot ==
In 1948, Reverend Desmond Spellacy is a young Roman Catholic monsignor in the Los Angeles Archdiocese. His older brother Tom is a homicide detective with the Los Angeles Police Department.

Des is skillful at developing church projects while keeping down costs. He sometimes cuts a corner, overlooking the shady side of construction mogul Jack Amsterdam, a lay Catholic who uses his ties to Des for the congregation's benefit but mainly for his own.

One day, Lois Fazenda, a young woman, is found murdered in a vacant lot, her body cut in two. Tom and his partner Frank Crotty are in charge of the case. Fazenda is labeled "the Virgin Tramp" by the press for apparently being both a Catholic and a prostitute, turning it into a sensational case.

Tom's investigation leads him to Brenda Samuels, a madam. Tom was acquainted with Brenda years earlier while working as a bagman for Amsterdam, whose corruption extends to the local prostitution ring.

Brenda called the police to report the death of a Catholic priest who was having sex with one of her prostitutes. While there, Brenda reproaches Tom for doing nothing for her while she was sent to prison for running one of Jack's whorehouses. Tom later believes that Fazenda appeared in a stag film and obtains a copy. He and Frank notice that a girl in the movie was at Brenda's brothel when they came to retrieve the philandering priest.

Tom wants Brenda's help with tracking down the girl. Frank spots her days later when she is being taken to jail after a roundup. They learn that Fazenda was a favorite of Leland Standard, a pornographic movie director, because of her tattoo. Standard did his filming in a deserted army post in El Segundo.

At lunch with his brother, Tom provokes Amsterdam with secret facts about Amsterdam's dark side, which makes Des uncomfortable. Des tells the Cardinal that the church needs to cut ties with Amsterdam for good. Des discusses "getting rid of Jack" with his cronies, who remind him that it would not be easily done. Sonny, a corrupt City Council member and mortician, proposes that they give Jack a salutation dinner.

Des organizes a Catholic "layman of the year" banquet for Amsterdam as a gesture of appreciation before ending the church's relationship with him. Furious, Tom walks up to Amsterdam at the banquet and pulls off his sash while shouting, "Were you wearing this when you were banging Lois Fazenda?" Jack attacks Tom, and they scream at each other.

Tom goes to Standard's "studio" and finds the floor and a bathtub covered with dried blood. He also finds Chinese food, which the medical examiner had found in her stomach. Tom and Frank look for Standard but learn that he had been killed in a car accident twelve hours after the murder.

Tom wants to drag in Amsterdam for questioning to humiliate him in public, but Frank talks him out of it. Tom starts digging around and discovers that Fazenda was having sex with community leaders.

Amsterdam's lawyer Dan Campion warns the Monsignor that Tom should lay off unless they want it revealed publicly that Des also knew Fazenda. She met Des only once in passing, whereas she had a sexual relationship with both Amsterdam and Campion. But the fact that Des had any kind of involvement in such a lurid case could permanently stain his reputation with the church.

Tom will not be talked out of it. His determination becomes complete when Brenda is found dead, an apparent suicide. He decides to have Amsterdam picked up and taken to headquarters, which leads to Des being treated the same way.

His rising career curtailed, Des asks to be relocated to a remote parish in the desert, the same place to which his mentor in the diocese, Monsignor Fargo, was exiled.

Years later, in 1962, Tom visits Des, who is now dying. Tom feels that everything is his fault, but Des calls him his salvation, tells him that he is at peace, and absolves his brother of all blame. He shows Tom the plot where they will be buried together.

== Cast ==
- Robert De Niro as Monsignor Desmond "Des" Spellacy
- Robert Duvall as Detective Tom Spellacy
- Charles Durning as Jack Amsterdam
- Cyril Cusack as Cardinal Danaher
- Burgess Meredith as Monsignor Seamus Fargo
- Kenneth McMillan as Detective Frank Crotty
- Ed Flanders as Dan T. Campion
- Dan Hedaya as Howard Terkel
- Rose Gregorio as Brenda Samuels
- Jeanette Nolan as Mrs. Spellacy
- Missy Cleveland as Lois Fazenda
- Tom Hill as Mr. Fazenda
- Gwen Van Dam as Mrs. Fazenda
- Jorge Cervera Jr. as Eduardo Duarte
- Darwyn Carson as Lorna Keane
- Pat Corley as Sonny McDonough
- Richard Foronjy as Ambulance Driver
- James Hong as Coroner Wong
- Kirk Brennan as Acolyte Toomey

=== Model for monsignor ===
The character of Msgr. Spellacy is thought to be based on Msgr. Benjamin Hawkes, who oversaw growth of the Archdiocese of Los Angeles from the 1950s into the 1980s. De Niro prepared for the role of the monsignor by observing Msgr. Hawkes as he said Mass. Conductor Paul Salamunovich, who was choir director for Hawkes's church choir at St. Basil's parish at the time, was brought in to coach De Niro on the sung Latin responses of the Mass and to conduct choral segments for the film.

== Production ==
Producers Irwin Winkler and Robert Chartoff acquired the rights to John Gregory Dunne's 1977 novel in April 1978. By October 1978, Dunne and his wife, screenwriter Joan Didion, had completed a script, and Paul Schrader was originally intended to revise the screenplay and direct. However, Didion ultimately rewrote the script, and Ulu Grosbard was hired as director. When hired, Robert De Niro had just two weeks to drop as much as possible of the weight that he had gained for Raging Bull.

Filming took place around Los Angeles in 1979, including at Echo Park, Union Station and Alverno High School. Production went over schedule, forcing original composer Bill Conti to drop out. The 15-week shoot was completed in mid-May 1980 near Lancaster, California.

== Release ==
The film was theatrically released in the United States on September 25, 1981. It was originally scheduled to be released sometime in 1980, then February 1981, but finally the September date.

=== Home media ===
True Confessions was released on DVD by MGM Home Video on April 17, 2007, as a Region 1 widescreen. It was released by 20th Century Fox Home Entertainment in 2009 as a part of the Robert De Niro 7-Movie Collection (with True Confessions as the seventh disc of the set). The film was released on Blu-ray by Kino Lorber on October 7, 2014.

== Reception ==
=== Box office ===
True Confessions opened at four theaters, making $154,923 in its opening weekend. It expanded to 417 theaters in its fourth weekend of release, making $1.5 million, and peaked at 458 theaters in its sixth weekend, when it made $1 million. It went on to gross $12.9 million at the domestic box office.

=== Critical response ===
On review aggregator website Rotten Tomatoes, the film holds an approval rating of 72% based on 18 reviews. Metacritic assigned the film a weighted average score of 68 out of 100, based on 12 critics, indicating "generally favorable" reviews.

Vincent Canby of The New York Times declared the film "a reminder of just how good commercial American movies can be when the right people come together".

Roger Ebert of the Chicago Sun-Times gave the film 3 stars out of 4. He wrote that, while the performances were good and some individual scenes very well-crafted, the movie as a whole was disappointing: "The attentions of the filmmakers were concentrated so fiercely on individual moments that nobody ever stood back to ask what the story was about. It's frustrating to sit through a movie filled with clues and leads and motivations, only to discover at the end that the filmmakers can't be bothered with finishing the story."

The film was panned by William F. Buckley Jr., who had praised the original novel. In his review of the film in the National Review, Buckley complained that "Robert De Niro is badly miscast. He is never entirely convincing."
