= Once and Again =

1999 American family drama television series

- Genre: Drama
- Created by: Edward Zwick; Marshall Herskovitz
- Starring: Sela Ward; Billy Campbell; Jeffrey Nordling; Susanna Thompson; Shane West; Julia Whelan; Evan Rachel Wood; Meredith Deane; Todd Field; Marin Hinkle; Jennifer Crystal Foley; David Clennon; Ever Carradine; Steven Weber
- Composers: W. G. Snuffy Walden; Joey Newman
- Country of origin: United States
- Original language: English
- No. of seasons: 3
- No. of episodes: 63

Production
- Running time: 60 minutes
- Production companies: The Bedford Falls Company; Touchstone Television

Original release
- Network: ABC
- Release: September 21, 1999 – April 15, 2002

Related
- thirtysomething

Once and Again is an American family drama television series, created by Marshall Herskovitz and Edward Zwick, which aired on ABC from September 21, 1999, to April 15, 2002. It depicts the family of a single mother, played by Sela Ward, and her romance with a single father, played by Billy Campbell.

One of the show's then-unique aspects was the "interview" sequences filmed in black and white and interspersed throughout each episode, where the characters would reveal their innermost thoughts and memories to the camera.

Ward won a Primetime Emmy Award for Outstanding Lead Actress in a Drama Series and Golden Globe Award for Best Actress – Television Series Drama for her performance.

== Premise ==
Lily Manning (Sela Ward) is a suburban soccer mom in her forties, who lives in Deerfield, Illinois. Recently separated from her philandering husband Jake (Jeffrey Nordling), Lily is raising her two daughters: insecure, anxiety-ridden 14-year-old Grace (Julia Whelan) and precocious nine-year-old Zoe (Meredith Deane). For support, she turns to her more free-spirited younger sister, Judy (Marin Hinkle), with whom she works at their bookstore called My Sister's Bookstore (renamed Booklovers later in the series).

Lily's life changes when, during the pilot episode, she meets Rick Sammler (Billy Campbell) in the principal's office of Grace's school, Upton Sinclair High School.

Rick is a single father and co-head of an architectural firm, Sammler/Cassili Associates, which is located in downtown Chicago. Rick has been divorced from his uptight ex-wife Karen (Susanna Thompson) for three years and has two children: Eli (Shane West), a 16-year-old basketball player at Sinclair High with a learning disability, and sensitive 12-year-old Jessie (Evan Rachel Wood), who longs for the days before her family's disintegration.

Lily and Rick share an immediate mutual attraction and begin dating. Their budding relationship causes problems in both of their respective families. Grace strongly objects to Lily and Rick's relationship as she still hopes to see her parents get back together. Karen, a public interest attorney at the downtown law firm of Harris, Riegert, and Sammler, is worried about the toll Rick's new relationship would take on their children, particularly Jessie, who is shy and emotionally fragile. She is also working through her own feelings of jealousy that Rick is moving on to a new relationship.

In addition to Lily and Rick's relationship, the show also focused to a lesser degree on their exes, Jake and Karen, and their own struggles to move on in a post-divorce environment.

== Plot summary ==
=== Season 1 ===
Lily is in the process of divorcing her restaurateur husband, Jake. She is reluctant to begin dating again due to the sensitivities of her daughters, who are still emotional about the divorce. She meets and is instantly attracted to divorced architect Rick Sammler. However, their new relationship is complicated by Lily's many remaining emotional and financial issues with Jake. Lily must navigate the complicated worlds of divorce, finding herself in midlife, and reentering the workforce. She is able to find strength and resilience as she affirms her marriage to Jake is over, starts a new job as a publishing assistant at the magazine Pages Alive, and grows in her relationship with Rick. Grace and Eli become close when she becomes his tutor. Judy has a relationship with Rick's friend, Sam Blue (Steven Weber) before discovering Sam is married.

=== Season 2 ===
Lily and Jake's divorce is finalized and she hopes to spend more time with Rick. However, Rick becomes sidetracked by difficulties at work and has to begin working with unscrupulous developer Miles Drentell (David Clennon, reprising his role from the series thirtysomething). Things become difficult for Lily when Rick's project runs into legal difficulties and his ex-wife Karen is hired to represent the opposition. Jessie flirts with an eating disorder and begins to address her problems with the help of a therapist (played by show producer Edward Zwick). Jake's girlfriend Tiffany announces she is pregnant. At the end of season two, Rick has to dissolve his architectural firm, and Lily and Rick get married.

=== Season 3 ===
Rick resumes his partnership with Sam Blue, now divorced, to design a hotel for a new client. Sam and Judy try to be friends but eventually resume their romantic relationship. Jake and Tiffany have a baby girl and eventually decide to get married. Grace develops a crush on her English teacher, Mr. Dimitri (Eric Stoltz); although their relationship never became sexual, an investigation eventually forces Mr. Dimitri to leave the school. Meanwhile, Jessie discovers she is attracted to another girl: upperclassman Katie Singer (Mischa Barton), and after Katie acknowledges her own romantic feelings towards Jessie with a love letter, the two girls quietly begin dating while hiding their romance from everyone, in what became the first teen lesbian romance on American network television. Karen deals with her depression; just as she is starting to make progress, she is hit by a car, leading to months of painful rehabilitation where she meets physical therapist Henry Higgins (D. B. Woodside). Lily faces more painful domestic struggles when her mother begins to show signs of Alzheimer's disease and her brother Aaron (Patrick Dempsey), who is schizophrenic, wants to move in with his girlfriend. By the end of the season, Rick and Lily face big decisions when he is offered a job in Australia and she is offered a nationally syndicated radio show. Their decisions are never shown, but in the last moments of the series finale, Lily reveals she is pregnant and everyone comes together to attend Jake and Tiffany's wedding.

== Cast ==
=== Main ===
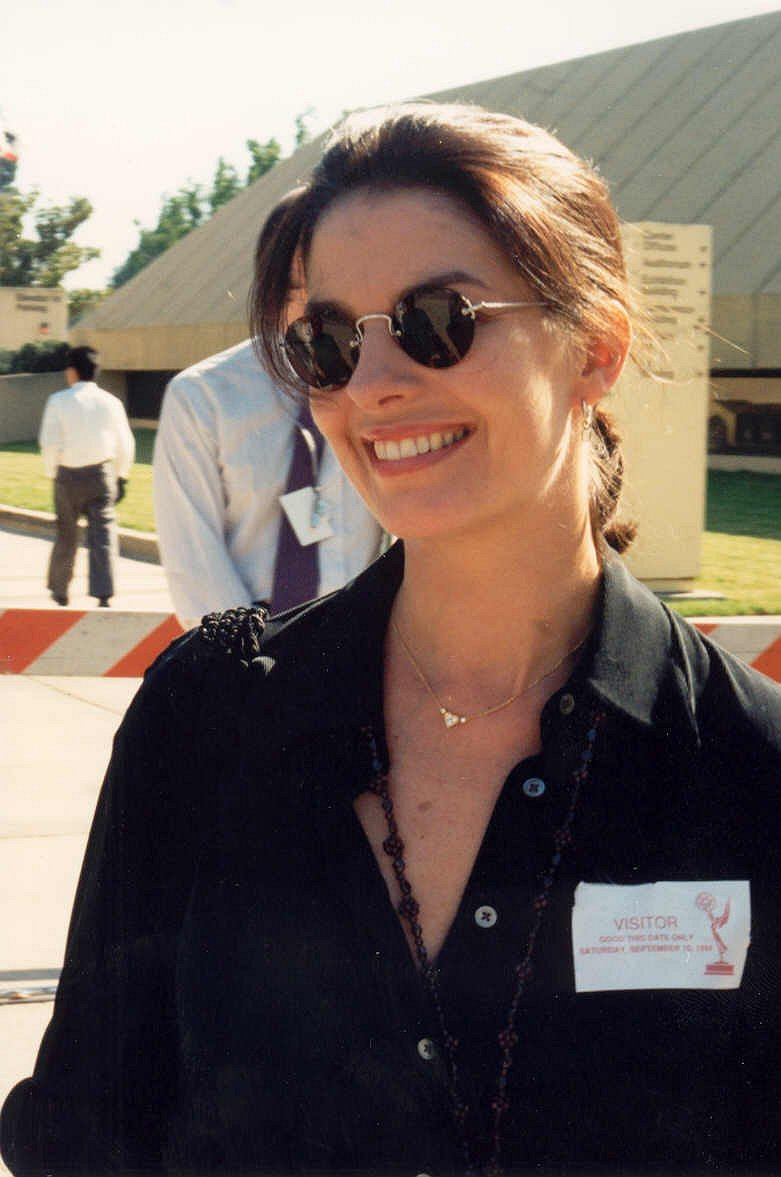
Sela Ward received several awards and nominations for her role as Lily Manning.

- Sela Ward as Lily Manning: Grace and Zoe's mother, separated from Jake
- Billy Campbell as Rick Sammler: Eli and Jessie's father, divorced from Karen
- Jeffrey Nordling as Jake Manning: Lily's estranged husband, Grace and Zoe's father
- Susanna Thompson as Karen Sammler: Rick's ex-wife, Eli and Jessie's mother
- Shane West as Eli Sammler: Rick's son
- Julia Whelan as Grace Manning: Lily's elder daughter
- Evan Rachel Wood as Jessie Sammler: Rick's daughter
- Meredith Deane as Zoe Manning: Lily's younger daughter
- Marin Hinkle as Judy Brooks: Lily's younger sister
- Todd Field as David Cassilli (season 2; (Note: Field was credited in the main cast for episodes 1 through 13 of the second season.) recurring season 1): Rick's business partner and friend
- Ever Carradine as Tiffany Porter (seasons 2–3; (Note: Carradine was credited in the main cast starting with episode 14 of the second season.) recurring season 1): Jake's mistress/girlfriend
- Jennifer Crystal Foley as Christie Parker (season 2; recurring season 1, guest season 3): Lily's boss at PagesAlive.com
- David Clennon as Miles Drentell (season 2 (Note: Clennon was credited in the main cast for episodes 1 through 21 of the second season.)): Rick and David's primary client
- Steven Weber as Samuel Blue (season 3; recurring season 1): Rick's friend and Judy's lover

=== Recurring ===
- Kimberly McCullough as Jennifer: Eli's girlfriend before Cassidy and before Carla
- Kelly Coffield as Naomi Porter: Lily and Karen's mutual friend
- James Eckhouse as Lloyd Lloyd: Karen's ill-fated date
- Paul Mazursky as Phil Brooks: Lily and Judy's father
- Bonnie Bartlett as Barbara Brooks: Lily and Judy's mother
- Mark Feuerstein as Leo Fisher: Karen's younger boyfriend
- Alexandra Holden as Cassidy: Eli's girlfriend after Jennifer
- Patrick Dempsey as Aaron Brooks: Lily and Judy's schizophrenic brother
- Audrey Marie Anderson as Carla Aldrich: Eli's girlfriend
- Mark Valley as Will Gluck: Handyman and Judy's lover
- D. B. Sweeney as Graham Rympalski: Lily and Christie's co-worker at PagesAlive.com
- Marco Gould as Spencer Lewicki: Grace's boyfriend
- Eric Stoltz as August Dimitri: Grace's English teacher/acting coach/romantic interest
- Paul Dooley as Les Creswell: Lily's boss at WIPX
- Mischa Barton as Katie Singer: Jessie's friend/girlfriend
- Christina Chang as Amanda: One of Rick's employees

== Episodes ==
Season	Episodes	Originally released	
Season	Episodes	First released	Last released
1	22	September 21, 1999	April 24, 2000
2	22	October 24, 2000	May 2, 2001
3	19	September 28, 2001	April 15, 2002

=== Season 1 (1999–2000) ===
No. overall	No. in season	Title	Directed by	Written by	Original release date
1	1	"Boy Meets Girl"	Marshall Herskovitz	Teleplay by : Marshall Herskovitz; Story by : Marshall Herskovitz & Edward Zwick	September 21, 1999
Lily Manning is separated with two daughters, Grace and Zoe. Rick Sammler has been divorced for three years with a teenage boy Eli and a daughter Jessie. They meet by chance one day when Grace is injured during a soccer game at their kids' school. Rick decides to ask Lily out and the two start dating while juggling their family problems. After a few dates, they end up at Lily's house but are surprised by her children and her ex walking in on them making out on the couch.
2	2	"Let's Spend the Night Together"	Marshall Herskovitz	Marshall Herskovitz and Edward Zwick	September 28, 1999
Rick and Lily want to take their relationship to the next level. While out on a lunch, they run into an ex-girlfriend of Rick. Rick is embarrassed and Lily becomes anxious about being intimate for the first time since separating from Jake. Eli asks his father advice about sleeping with his girlfriend Jennifer for the first time. A rumor starts at school about Eli and Grace.
3	3	"The Scarlet Letter Jacket"	Dan Lerner	Marshall Herskovitz and Edward Zwick	October 5, 1999
Rick, Karen, Jake and Lily all sign up to help with the school carnival. Lily and Karen are paired together to work a booth but Karen still doesn't know about Lily dating her ex husband. Lily acts awkwardly all day around Karen, while Jake and Rick seem to get along. Eli and Grace also work the popcorn booth together but Grace becomes embarrassed when some girls at school make fun of her for being interested in Eli.
4	4	"Liars and Other Strangers"	Ron Lagomarsino	Winnie Holzman	October 12, 1999
Lily and Rick try to find a place to spend time together without the risk of being interrupted by their kids. Judy offers to lend her place and ends up meeting Rick. She expresses her doubts about him to Lily. Eli lies to Karen about his dad being with Lily to protect her feelings.
5	5	"There Be Dragons"	Robert Lieberman	Liberty Godshall	October 19, 1999
Rick arranges to have Lily stop by his place when his kids are there in order to introduce her. When Rick cuts himself while cooking, Lily helps handling the situation, which leads to some tension with Jessie. Jessie gets her first period. Jake tries to get back together with Lily, who refuses.
6	6	"A Dream Deferred"	Scott Winant	Jan Oxenberg	October 26, 1999
Lily discovers that Jake hasn't paid the mortgage. She is hit with the reality that she has to take care of herself and be more careful about her financial situation and arrangement with Jake. At the bookstore, Judy wants to remodel but her plans are taken over by Lily and Rick. Judy, feeling left out and unable to help her sister, considers moving on from the bookstore.
7	7	"The Ex-Files"	Robert Allan Black	Winnie Holzman	November 2, 1999
Rick and Karen both attend Eli's weekend basketball tournament. The situation brings some awkwardness between the two. Grace and Zoey spend the weekend at Jake's and meet a friend of his, Tiffany, who he has a romantic history with. Grace is uncomfortable and calls Lily for help, which leads to a fight with her father.
8	8	"The Past Is Prologue"	Patrick R. Norris and Claudia Weill	Marshall Herskovitz and Edward Zwick	November 9, 1999
Rick has to work non stop on an important architecture project for his firm. He tries to juggle working and spending time with Lily. The situation triggers memories from their past marriages and how Lily would spend time waiting around on Jake, and Rick would be criticized by Karen for working too much.
9	9	"Outside Hearts"	Todd Field	Alexa Junge	November 16, 1999
Lily goes away for a convention and leaves her daughters with Judy. Judy naively lets Grace go to an unsupervised party. Karen and Rick decide to trust Eli with driving to the same party. At the party, things turn bad leaving Grace in shock and Eli trying to be responsible under pressure.
10	10	"Thanksgiving"	Claudia Weill	Marshall Herskovitz and Edward Zwick	November 23, 1999
Lily's parents, Phil and Barbara, visit for Thanksgiving. They decide to go see Jake at the restaurant, ignoring Lily's complaints. Lily and Judy discover that Jake still owes money to their parents. Phil empathizes with Jake's situation and tries to convince Lily to give her marriage another chance. Rick spends Thanksgiving alone while Karen invites a coworker, Lloyd, over for dinner.
11	11	"Where There's Smoke"	Edward Zwick	Michael Weller	December 7, 1999
A small fire at Lily's house leads to Jake spending more time at her house to fix wiring issues. At Karen's, Eli asks to move into the basement with some help from Rick. Karen has trouble accepting that Eli wants more independence. Lily organizes a dinner to officially introduce Rick to her daughters. Jake has problems at the restaurant which worries Lily and Grace. Jake confides in Lily bringing them closer together.
12	12	"The Gingerbread House"	Dan Lerner	Teleplay by : Pamela Gray & Winnie Holzman; Story by : Pamela Gray	December 21, 1999
After sleeping with Jake, Lily is uncomfortable around Rick and tries to hide it from him. Rick figures out something is wrong and tries to learn the truth. Grace, who saw her parents together, think Lily and Jake are getting back together.
13	13	"Mediation"	Peter Horton	Pamela Gray	January 24, 2000
Rick and Lily each try to deal with their breakup but decides to get back together. Lily and Jake start mediation in their divorce proceedings and Lily worries about having to sell the house. Pushed by Jennifer, Grace starts tutoring Eli. Rick begins working with a difficult new client, Miles Drentell, which puts him at odds with his business partner, David.
14	14	"Sneaky Feelings"	Claudia Weill	Sue Paige & Daniel Paige	January 31, 2000
Karen has a new client, Leo Fischer, whom she's attracted to. Eli wants some space from Jennifer and starts to hang out with another girl, Cassidy. Jessie, who likes Jennifer, is uncomfortable with her brother's actions.
15	15	"The Mystery Dance"	Dan Lerner	Sue Paige & Daniel Paige	February 7, 2000
Judy goes on a dating spree. At an art gallery, she meets Sam Blue, a sculptor working on a project for Miles Drentell with Rick. Lily and Rick try to mend their relationship but Rick has trouble letting go of her infidelity.
16	16	"Daddy's Girl"	Barnet Kellman	Liberty Godshall	February 14, 2000
Jake's restaurant is reopening and Lily's father, Phil, visits them for the occasion. Lily is in financial trouble because Jake maxed out their credit card for the restaurant. She decides to hire a divorce lawyer which escalates the situation with Jake. Grace meets a boy in school that she has a lot in common with.
17	17	"Unfinished Business"	Edward Zwick	Marshall Herskovitz & Edward Zwick	March 6, 2000
Lily applies for a job in a magazine. Lily's father, Phil has a car accident with Grace. Recovering from minor injuries at Lily's house, he collapses on the floor. The family gathers in the hospital to face his difficult health predicament.
18	18	"Strangers and Brothers"	Marshall Herskovitz	Richard Kramer	March 13, 2000
Aaron, Lily's brother, reunites with the family for their father's funeral. They also have to deal with Phil's will and find out that he put his family in charge of the restaurant over Jake.
19	19	"Cat-in-Hat"	Claudia Weill	Michael Weller	April 3, 2000
As Karen and Leo grow closer together, they are forced to define their relationship when Leo invites himself over to Karen's and meets the kids. Eli becomes interested in joining a band and manipulates his parents in order to go see the band in a bar. His lies are discovered when he bumps into Karen at the bar. Jessie gets upset about her taekwondo belt test when she realizes that boys treat her differently because she's better than them.
20	20	"My Brilliant Career"	Dan Lerner	Jan Oxenberg	April 10, 2000
Lily starts her new job at the magazine with Chrissy Parker. Overwhelmed by her new responsibilities and her family life, she struggles to find her place and show her skills. Grace has a date with Jared to go see his father play jazz in a club. After a conversation with Tiffany, Grace understands that she started seeing her father when he was still with Lily.
21	21	"Letting Go"	Peter Horton	Alexa Junge	April 17, 2000
Rick and Lily find out that Judy has been seeing Sam even though he's still married. Being out of her bubble with Sam leads to Judy to make decisions about her relationship. Jake tries to mend his relationship with Grace after she discovered he cheated on Lily with Tiffany. When Rick gets sick with pneumonia without her noticing, Lily realizes she's been taking him for granted.
22	22	"A Door, About to Open"	Dan Lerner	Winnie Holzman	April 24, 2000
Lily and Rick decide to organize a dinner to officially introduce their kids. It triggers a domino effect of everyone trying to figure out their places in the family. Lily realizes that her friends hang out without her anymore since she started dating Rick. Rick is in a lot of stress at his firm because of the pressure Miles puts on him. Grace is forced to have a difficult conversation with Eli about his girlfriend Cassidy. Judy bonds with Karen when she visits the bookstore.

=== Season 2 (2000–01) ===
No. overall	No. in season	Title	Directed by	Written by	Original release date
23	1	"Wake Up, Little Susie"	Marshall Herskovitz	Marshall Herskovitz & Edward Zwick	October 24, 2000
24	2	"BookLovers"	Dan Lerner	Winnie Holzman	October 31, 2000
25	3	"I Can't Stand Up (For Falling Down)"	Peter Horton	Sue Paige & Daniel Paige	November 14, 2000
26	4	"Feast or Famine"	Claudia Weill	Marshall Herskovitz & Edward Zwick	November 21, 2000
27	5	"Ozymandias"	Michael Engler	Joseph Dougherty	November 28, 2000
28	6	"Food for Thought"	Edward Zwick	Marshall Herskovitz & Edward Zwick	December 5, 2000
29	7	"Learner's Permit"	Arvin Brown	Liberty Godshall	December 19, 2000
30	8	"Life Out of Balance"	James Eckhouse	Lynn Siefert	January 10, 2001
31	9	"Scribbling Rivalry"	Dan Lerner	Jan Oxenberg	January 17, 2001
32	10	"Love's Laborer's Lost"	Michael Engler	Emily Whitesell	January 24, 2001
33	11	"Thieves Like Us"	Claudia Weill	Winnie Holzman	January 31, 2001
34	12	"Suspicion"	James Eckhouse	Liberty Godshall	February 7, 2001
35	13	"Edifice Wrecked"	Dan Lerner	Winnie Holzman	February 14, 2001
36	14	"The Other End of the Telescope"	Robert Berlinger	Sue Paige & Daniel Paige	March 7, 2001
37	15	"Standing Room Only"	Arlene Sanford	Jan Oxenberg	March 14, 2001
38	16	"Aaron's Getting Better"	James Kramer	Richard Kramer	March 21, 2001
39	17	"Forgive Us Our Trespasses"	Dan Lerner	Story by : Lynn Siefert; Teleplay by : Lynn Siefert and Winnie Holzman	March 28, 2001
40	18	"Best of Enemies"	Barnet Kellman	Emily Whitesell	April 4, 2001
41	19	"Armageddon"	Marshall Herskovitz	Marshall Herskovitz & Edward Zwick	April 11, 2001
42	20	"Won't Someone Please Help George Bailey Tonight?"	Dan Lerner	Liberty Godshall and Marshall Herskovitz & Edward Zwick	April 18, 2001
43	21	"Moving On"	Ken Collins	Sue Paige & Daniel Paige	April 25, 2001
44	22	"The Second Time Around"	Dan Lerner	Winnie Holzman	May 2, 2001

=== Season 3 (2001–02) ===
No. overall	No. in season	Title	Directed by	Written by	Original release date
45	1	"Busted"	Dan Lerner	Marshall Herskovitz & Edward Zwick	September 28, 2001
46	2	"The Awful Truth"	Michael Engler	Winnie Holzman	October 5, 2001
47	3	"Kind of Blue"	Peter Horton	Richard Kramer	October 12, 2001
48	4	"Acting Out"	Michael Engler	Sue Paige & Daniel Paige	October 19, 2001
49	5	"Destiny Turns On the Radio"	Ken Collins	Winnie Holzman	November 2, 2001
50	6	"Jake and the Women"	Mark Piznarski	Sue Paige & Daniel Paige	November 9, 2001
51	7	"Chaos Theory"	James Eckhouse	Liberty Godshall	November 23, 2001
52	8	"The Sex Show"	Dan Lerner	Emily Whitesell	November 30, 2001
53	9	"Tough Love"	Jim Kramer	Maggie Friedman	December 7, 2001
54	10	"Pictures"	Dan Lerner	Alexa Junge	December 14, 2001
55	11	"Taking Sides"	Mark Piznarski	David Schulner	January 4, 2002
56	12	"Gardenia"	Edward Zwick	Richard Kramer	January 11, 2002
57	13	"Falling in Place"	Eric Stoltz	Sue Paige & Daniel Paige	March 4, 2002
58	14	"The Gay-Straight Alliance"	Patrick Norris	Winnie Holzman and Maggie Friedman	March 11, 2002
59	15	"One Step (Parent) Backward"	Elodie Keene	David Schulner	March 18, 2002
60	16	"Aaron's List of Dreams"	Dan Lerner	Richard Kramer	March 25, 2002
61	17	"Experience Is the Teacher"	Matt Shakman	Winnie Holzman and Maggie Friedman	April 1, 2002
62	18	"Losing You"	Jim Kramer	Liberty Godshall	April 8, 2002
63	19	"Chance of a Lifetime"	Dan Lerner	Sue Paige & Daniel Paige and Marshall Herskovitz & Edward Zwick	April 15, 2002

== Production ==
The series was filmed at the Century Studio Corporation sound stages in Culver City, California, and also on location in the Los Angeles area.

== DVD releases ==
Walt Disney Studios Home Entertainment (formerly Buena Vista Home Entertainment) released Season 1 on November 5, 2002, mere months after the series finale. However, it took three more years and numerous petition drives for season two to be released, which occurred on August 23, 2005. A little over a month later, on September 30, 2005, news broke about the release of the third and final season, which was slated to occur on January 10, 2006. Mock-up photos of the packaging were even released. However, by October 2005 the title was delayed indefinitely with no explanation and was never released.

It was almost two years before another official word was uttered on the subject and in July 2007, it was reported that Buena Vista's license on the program was soon to expire. As a result, a new company could acquire the distribution rights to the title and potentially release the third season.

DVD name	Ep #	Release date
Season 1	22	November 5, 2002
Season 2	22	August 23, 2005
Season 3	19	Not yet officially released on DVD

== Ratings ==
Season	Timeslot (EST/EDT)	Season premiere	Season finale	TV season	Rank	Viewers (in millions)	18–49 average
1	Tuesday 10:00 p.m. (September 21 – December 21, 1999) Monday 10:00 p.m. (January 24 – April 24, 2000)	September 21, 1999	April 24, 2000	1999–2000	#51	10.93	7.9/13
2	Tuesday 10:00 p.m. (October 24 – December 19, 2000) Wednesday 10:00 p.m. (January 10 – May 2, 2001)	October 24, 2000	May 2, 2001	2000–2001	#84	8.5	N/A
3	Friday 10:00 p.m. (September 28, 2001 – January 11, 2002) Monday 10:00 p.m. (March 4 – April 15, 2002)	September 28, 2001	April 15, 2002	2001–2002	#107	6.7	N/A
