= John Gregory Dunne =

American writer (1932–2003)

- Born: May 25, 1932; Hartford, Connecticut, U.S.
- Died: December 30, 2003 (aged 71); New York City, U.S.
- Education: Princeton University
- Occupations: Essayist; novelist; journalist; screenwriter
- Spouse: Joan Didion (m. 1964)
- Children: 1
- Relatives: Dominick Dunne (brother); Griffin Dunne (nephew); Dominique Dunne (niece); Hannah Dunne (great-niece)
- Writing career
- Years active: 1954–2003
- Notable works: The Studio (1969); True Confessions (1977)

John Gregory Dunne (May 25, 1932 – December 30, 2003) was an American writer. He began his career as a journalist for Time magazine before expanding into writing criticism, essays, novels, and screenplays. He often collaborated with his wife, Joan Didion.

== Early life ==
Dunne was born in Hartford, Connecticut, and was a younger brother of author Dominick Dunne. He was the son of Dorothy Frances (née Burns) and Richard Edwin Dunne (1894–1946), a hospital chief of staff and heart surgeon. John was the fifth of six children in the family. John's maternal grandfather, Dominick Francis Burns (1857–1940), founded the Park Street Trust Company.

John Dunne developed a severe stutter as a child and took up writing to express himself. He learned to manage it by observing others. He attended the Portsmouth Abbey School and graduated from Princeton University in 1954, where he was a member of Tiger Inn.

== Career ==
Dunne started working as a journalist in New York City for Time magazine. He credited the political essayist Noel Parmentel as a mentor in many ways.

In the late 1950s, he met Joan Didion in New York City, where she was an editor at Vogue. In a 2005 interview, Didion recalled, "We amused each other and I thought he was smart. He knew a lot of stuff that I didn't know, like politics and history. I had managed to go through school without learning much except a lot of poems." He invited her to travel to Connecticut one weekend in 1963 to visit his family, New England Irish Catholic, with six children. Didion said she "liked the set-up, liked being there, and liked him."

After they married in 1964, the couple moved to a remote house on the California coast; Didion worked on a novel to follow her debut Run, River, and Dunne on a book about the California grape pickers' strike. They wrote a jointly bylined column for The Saturday Evening Post from 1967 until the magazine folded in 1969.

Dunne and Didion gradually picked up writing work from book publishers and magazines, traveled together on journalism assignments, and established a working pattern that served for the next 40 years. They had a constant advising, consulting, and editing collaboration. Critically acclaimed bestselling books followed for each, including Dunne's The Studio, his nonfiction account of 20th Century Fox.

They also collaborated on a series of screenplays, including The Panic in Needle Park (1971), A Star Is Born (1976), and True Confessions (1981), an adaptation of Dunne's novel of the same name. He wrote a nonfiction book about Hollywood, Monster: Living Off the Big Screen.

As a literary critic and essayist, Dunne was a frequent contributor to The New York Review of Books. His essays were collected in two books, Quintana & Friends (1980) and Crooning (1990). He wrote several novels, among them True Confessions, based loosely on the Black Dahlia murder, and Dutch Shea, Jr. He was the writer and narrator of the 1990 PBS documentary L.A. is It with John Gregory Dunne, in which he guided viewers through Los Angeles's cultural landscape.

His final novel, Nothing Lost, which was in galleys at the time of his death, was published in 2004.

== Personal life ==
Dunne was uncle to actors Griffin Dunne and Dominique Dunne.

He married Joan Didion on January 30, 1964, at Mission San Juan Bautista in California. He was 31 and she 29. They contemplated filing for divorce in 1969, as Didion famously wrote in one of her essays. Unable to have children, in 1966 they adopted a baby at birth and named her Quintana Roo, after the Mexican state. Quintana died in 2005 at age 39 after a series of illnesses.

In 1988, Dunne and Didion moved from Southern California to New York City. They moved to the Upper East Side, where Didion continued to live for 33 years until her death in 2021. Dunne died in their Manhattan apartment of a heart attack on December 30, 2003.

Didion wrote and published The Year of Magical Thinking (2005), a memoir of the year following his death, during which their daughter was seriously ill. It won critical acclaim and the National Book Award.

== Books ==
=== Fiction ===
- True Confessions (1977) ISBN 978-1560258155
- Dutch Shea, Jr. (1982) ISBN 978-0722131053
- The Red White and Blue (1987) ISBN 978-0312909659
- Playland (1994) ISBN 978-0679424277
- Nothing Lost (2004) ISBN 978-1400041435

=== Non-fiction ===
- Delano: The Story of the California Grape Strike (1967) ISBN 978-0520254336
- The Studio (1969) ISBN 978-0375700088
- Vegas: A Memoir of a Dark Season (1974) ISBN 978-0704330542; McNally Editions (2025) ISBN 978-196134-132-6
- Quintana and Friends (1978) ISBN 978-0671832414
- Harp (1989) ISBN 978-0671725143
- Crooning: A Collection (1990) ISBN 978-0671740313
- Monster: Living Off the Big Screen (1997) ISBN 978-0375750243
- Regards: The Selected Nonfiction of John Gregory Dunne (2005) ISBN 978-1560258162

== Screenplays ==
- The Panic in Needle Park (1971)
- Play It as It Lays (1972)
- A Star Is Born (1976)
- True Confessions (1981)
- Up Close & Personal (1996)
