= Meredith Deane =

American child actress (born 1989)

- Born: August 9, 1989 (age 36); New York, New York, U.S.
- Years active: 1999–2009

Meredith Deane (born August 9, 1989) is an American former child actress most known for her role as Zoe Manning in the TV show Once and Again. She recently starred in the Law & Order episode "Profiteer" as Ashlee.

Deane attended the Dalton School in New York City. She graduated in 2007 and began college at Boston University in the fall. After joining Sigma Delta Tau at BU, she transferred to the University of Southern California.
