= Ulu Grosbard =

Belgian-American theatre and film director

- Born: Israel Grosbard; 9 January 1929; Antwerp, Belgium
- Died: 19 March 2012 (aged 83); New York City, New York, U.S.
- Education: University of Chicago (BA, MA); Yale University
- Occupations: Film director, film producer, theatre director
- Spouse: Rose Gregorio (m. 1965)

Israel "Ulu" Grosbard (January 9, 1929 – March 19, 2012) was a Belgian-born, naturalized American theater and film director and film producer.

== Life and career ==
Born in Antwerp, Grosbard was the son of Rose (Tenenbaum) and Morris Grosbard, the latter of whom worked in business and as a diamond merchant. Grosbard emigrated to Havana with his family in 1942; they were fleeing the persecution of Jews by the German occupiers of Belgium during World War II. In 1948, they moved to the United States, where he earned a Bachelor of Arts and a Master of Arts from the University of Chicago. He studied at the Yale School of Drama for one year before joining the U.S. Army. Grosbard became a naturalized citizen in 1954.

Grosbard gravitated toward theater when he moved to New York City in the early 1960s. After directing The Days and Nights of BeeBee Fenstermaker off-Broadway, he earned his first Broadway credit with The Subject Was Roses, for which he was nominated for the Tony Award for Best Direction of a Play in 1964. The same year, he won the Obie Award for Best Direction, and the Drama Desk Award for Outstanding Director of a Play for an off-Broadway revival of the Arthur Miller play, A View from the Bridge, for which Dustin Hoffman served as stage manager and assistant director.

Grosbard's additional Broadway credits include Miller's The Price; David Mamet's American Buffalo, which earned him Tony and Drama Desk Award nominations; Woody Allen's The Floating Light Bulb; and a revival of Paddy Chayefsky's The Tenth Man.

In Hollywood, Grosbard worked as an assistant director on Splendor in the Grass, West Side Story, The Hustler, The Miracle Worker and The Pawnbroker. He directed the screen adaptations of The Subject Was Roses, Who Is Harry Kellerman and Why Is He Saying Those Terrible Things About Me?, Straight Time, True Confessions, Falling in Love, Georgia and The Deep End of the Ocean.

=== Personal life ===
Grosbard was married to actress Rose Gregorio from 1965 until his death. Grosbard died on March 19, 2012, at the Langone Medical Center in Manhattan. He was 83.
