= Sela Ward =

American actress (born 1956)

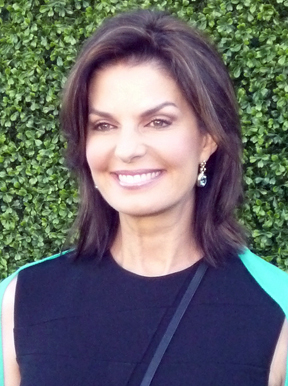
- Ward in 2010
- Born: Sela Ann Ward; July 11, 1956 (age 70); Meridian, Mississippi, U.S.
- Education: University of Alabama
- Occupations: Actress; author; producer
- Years active: 1983–present
- Known for: Sisters; Once and Again; CSI: NY
- Spouse: Howard Sherman (m. 1992)
- Children: 2

Sela Ann Ward (born July 11, 1956) is an American actress. Her breakthrough TV role was as Teddy Reed in the NBC drama series Sisters (1991–96), for which she received her first Primetime Emmy Award for Outstanding Lead Actress in a Drama Series in 1994. She received her second Primetime Emmy Award and Golden Globe Award for Best Actress – Television Series Drama for the leading role of Lily Manning in the ABC drama series Once and Again (1999–2002). Ward later had the recurring role of Stacy Warner in the Fox medical drama House, also starred as Jo Danville in the CBS police procedural CSI: NY (2010–13) and starred as Dana Mosier in the CBS police procedural series FBI (2018–19).

She also played supporting roles in films, including The Man Who Loved Women (1983), Rustlers' Rhapsody (1985), Nothing in Common (1986), Hello Again (1987), The Fugitive (1993), My Fellow Americans (1996), The Badge (2002), The Day After Tomorrow (2004), The Guardian (2006), The Stepfather (2009), Gone Girl (2014), and Independence Day: Resurgence (2016).

== Early life ==
Ward was born in Meridian, Mississippi, to Annie Kate (née Boswell), a homemaker, and Granberry Holland "G.H." Ward Jr., an electrical engineer. Her father is a native of Meridian while her mother was born in Choctaw County, Alabama, before moving to Meridian as a child. Ward is the eldest of four children with a sister, Jenna, and two brothers, Joseph Brock and Granberry Holland Ward III. She graduated from Lamar School, a segregation academy, in Meridian.

Ward attended the University of Alabama, where she was Homecoming Queen, a Crimson Tide cheerleader, and joined Chi Omega sorority. She double-majored in fine art and advertising. She graduated in 1977.

== Career ==
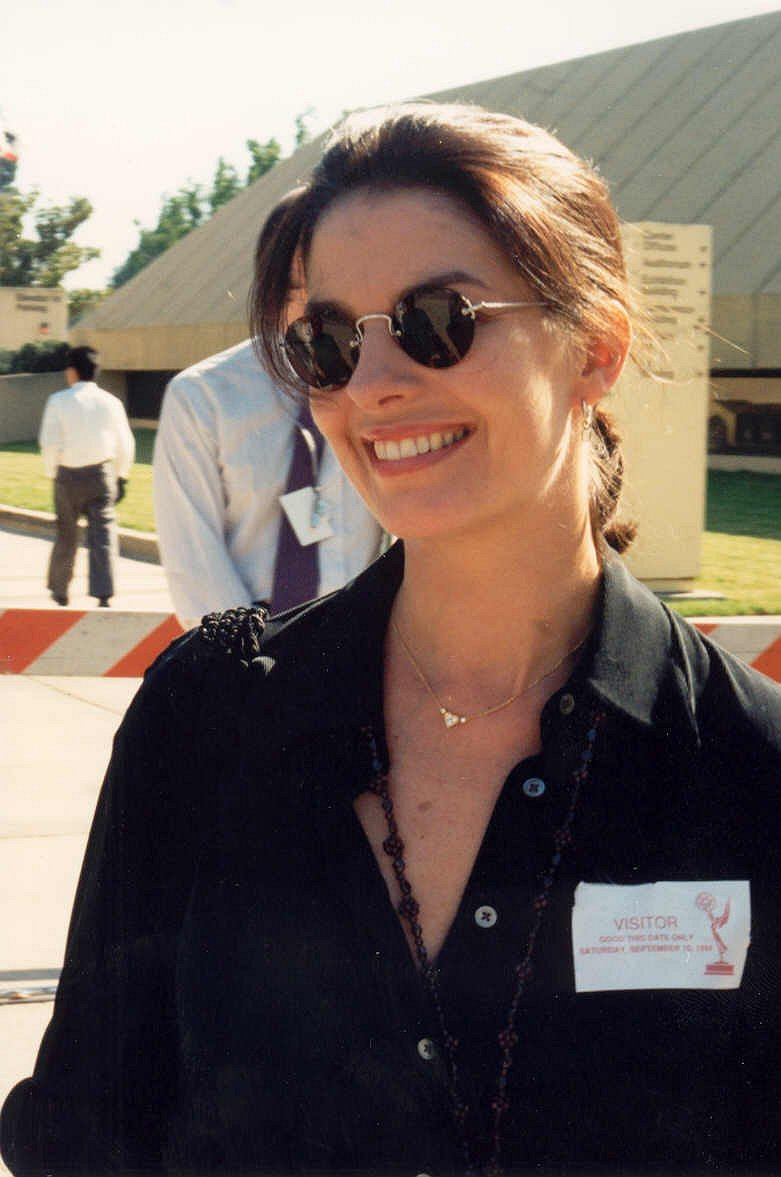
Ward in 1994

While working in New York City as a storyboard artist for multimedia presentations, Ward began modeling to supplement her income. She was recruited by the Wilhelmina agency and was soon featured in television commercials promoting Maybelline cosmetics.

Ward eventually moved to California to pursue acting and landed her first film role in the 1983 Burt Reynolds vehicle The Man Who Loved Women. Her first regular role in a television drama series, as a socialite on Dennis Weaver's short-lived CBS series, Emerald Point N.A.S., followed in the same year. Ward continued to land guest roles in both television and films throughout the 1980s, most notably opposite Tom Hanks in 1986's Nothing in Common. In 1991 she was cast as the bohemian alcoholic Teddy Reed on Sisters, for which she received her first Emmy for Outstanding Lead Actress in a Drama Series in 1994. She portrayed Helen Kimble, the wife of Dr. Richard Kimble (Harrison Ford), in The Fugitive, one of the top films of 1993.

Ward won a CableACE Award for her portrayal of the late television journalist Jessica Savitch in the 1995 TV film Almost Golden: The Jessica Savitch Story. Almost Golden remains Lifetime's most watched TV film to date.

In 1995, Ward was passed over for a Bond girl role for the 1995 movie GoldenEye, learning that even though then-Bond Pierce Brosnan was 42, the casting director said "What we really want is Sela, but Sela ten years ago". In response, she developed and produced a documentary, The Changing Face of Beauty, about American obsession with youth and its effect on women. Later on, Ward would voice the part of former model turned villain Page Monroe in an episode ("Mean Seasons") of The New Batman/Superman Adventures, which focused primarily on the media's obsession with youth.

Ward succeeded Candice Bergen as commercial spokesperson for Sprint's long distance telephone service from 1999 until 2002. She also appeared on Frasier as supermodel/zoologist Kelly Easterbrook in the fifth season opener ("Frasier's Imaginary Friend"). When she read for the role of Lily Brooks Manning on the series Once and Again, its creators (Edward Zwick and Marshall Herskovitz of thirtysomething fame) initially deemed Ward "too beautiful" for the average single mother to identify with. Ward received her second lead actress Emmy and a Golden Globe Award.

In 2004, she played the role of a private investigator in the television film Suburban Madness. The same year, she also appeared in the film The Day After Tomorrow with Dennis Quaid and Jake Gyllenhaal. In 2005, she began a recurring role in the Fox dramatic series House as Stacy Warner, the hospital's attorney and formidable ex-partner of the protagonist Dr. Gregory House (played by Hugh Laurie). In 2006, Ward's character was written off the show. However, she made her last guest appearance in the series finale (which aired on May 21, 2012).

Ward was originally offered both the role of Megan Donner on CSI: Miami and Susan Mayer on Desperate Housewives, but turned both down. Ward was reluctant to commit to another lead role in an hour-long series because of the time away from her family it would require.

Although she was on a brief hiatus from television, she continued to appear in feature films. She starred opposite Kevin Costner in The Guardian in 2006 and starred in the thriller The Stepfather in 2009. In July 2010, Ward signed on to star in the police drama CSI: NY, at the seventh season's start. Ward remained on the show until the ninth and final season's end in February 2013.

Ward appeared as newswoman Sharon Schieber in Gone Girl (2014), and co-starred in Independence Day: Resurgence, released June 2016, in which she played the President of the United States, President Lanford. She also played the leading role alongside Nick Nolte in the political comedy series Graves. She was in a leading role alongside Missy Peregrym, Zeeko Zaki and Jeremy Sisto in the crime series FBI.

== Personal life ==
On May 23, 1992, Ward married entrepreneur Howard Elliott Sherman. They have two children: Austin and Anabella.

After meeting two foster children during a holiday trip home to Mississippi in 1997, Ward decided to fund the broader needs of abused and neglected children by creating a permanent group home and emergency shelter with transition houses. Hope Village for Children opened in Ward's hometown of Meridian in January 2002 on a 30-acre (12 ha) property once used as a Masonic orphanage. It is intended to model a nationwide network of similar shelters. Hope Village had a capacity of 44 residents and served an average of 300 children per year as of 2015.

In 2002, Ward published her autobiography, Homesick: A Memoir, through HarperCollins' ReganBooks imprint. In 2014, Ward was a part of her first group art exhibition at KM Fine Arts.

== Filmography ==
=== Film ===
Year	Title	Role	Notes
1983	The Man Who Loved Women	Janet Wainwright	
1985	Rustlers' Rhapsody	Colonel's Daughter	
1986	Nothing in Common	Cheryl Ann Wayne	
1987	Hello Again	Kim Lacey	
1987	Steele Justice	Tracy	
1989	The Haunting of Sarah Hardy	Sarah Hardy	
1991	Child of Darkness, Child of Light	Sister Anne	
1992	Double Jeopardy	Karen Hart	
1993	The Fugitive	Helen Kimble	
1996	My Fellow Americans	Kaye Griffin	
1998	54	Billie Auster	
1999	Runaway Bride	Pretty Woman in Bar	Cameo
2000	Catch a Falling Star	Sydney Clarke	
2002	The Badge	Carla Hardwick	
2004	Dirty Dancing: Havana Nights	Jeannie Miller	
2004	The Day After Tomorrow	Dr. Lucy Hall	
2006	The Guardian	Helen Randall	
2009	The Stepfather	Susan Harding	
2014	Gone Girl	Sharon Schieber	
2016	Independence Day: Resurgence	President Elizabeth Lanford	

=== Television ===
Year	Title	Role	Notes
1983–84	Emerald Point N.A.S.	Hilary Adams	22 episodes
1985	I Had Three Wives	Emily	Episode: "Til Death Do us Part"
1986	Hotel	Isabel Atwood	Episode: "Hornet's Nest"
1986	L.A. Law	Lynette Pierce	2 episodes
1987	Night Court	Heather	Episode: "Christine's Friend"
1989	Bridesmaids	Caryl	Television film
1990	Rainbow Drive	Laura Demming	Television film
1991–96	Sisters	Teddy Reed	127 episodes
1995	Almost Golden: The Jessica Savitch Story	Jessica Savitch	Television film
1997	Frasier	Kelly Easterbrook	Episode: "Frasier's Imaginary Friend"
1997	Stories of Courage: Two Women	Marie-Rose Gineste	Television film
1999	The New Batman Adventures	Page Monroe/Calendar Girl	Voice, episode: "Mean Seasons"
1999–2002	Once and Again	Lily Manning	63 episodes
2000	Catch a Falling Star	Sydney Clark	Television film
2004	Suburban Madness	Bobbi Bacha	Television film
2005–06	House	Stacy Warner	10 episodes
2010–13	CSI: NY	Jo Danville	57 episodes
2016–17	Graves	Margaret Graves	20 episodes
2018	Westworld	Juliet	1 Episode
2018–19	FBI	Special Agent in Charge Dana Mosier	21 Episodes
2026	The Rookie	Joy Bradford	3 Episodes

== Legacy ==
A roughly 0.9 miles (1.4 km) stretch of 22nd Avenue in Meridian (from 6th Street southeast to the Interstate 20 highway interchange) has been named the "Sela Ward Parkway" in her honor.
