= Sheridan Square Playhouse =

Theater in New York City (1958–1996)

- Interactive map of Sheridan Square Playhouse
- Address: 99 Seventh Avenue South
- Location: New York, New York
- Coordinates: 40.733031°N 74.002866°W
- Type: Off-Broadway

Construction
- Opened: 6 May 1958
- Closed: 1996 (as a theatre)

The Sheridan Square Playhouse was an Off-Broadway theatre in New York City that was active from 1958 through the early 1990s. Closed as a theatre in 1996, the theatre was located at 99 7th Avenue South in Greenwich Village.

== History ==
Prior to being a theatre, the building was host to The Nut Club, a famous nightclub frequented by people such as Lionel Barrymore, Jimmy Durante, Eddie Cantor, and Mae West. The building was originally built as a garage, on the foundations of a church demolished in 1917 for the construction of the IRT 7th Avenue line.

The Sheridan Square Playhouse opened on May 6, 1958 with a production of Jacinto Benavente's 1907 play The Bonds of Interest (Los intereses creados). It soon hosted a two-year revival of the musical Leave It to Jane. The theatre became the home of the Circle Repertory Company in 1972, hosting their plays through the 1993-1994 theatre season, after which the company relocated to the Circle in the Square Theatre's former home at 159 Bleecker Street.

The last production at the theatre was Graydon Royce and Geoffrey C. Ewing's (who also starred in) Ali in 1992. The building became a restaurant and jazz club under the name Garage Restaurant and Cafe, which closed in 2015.
