= Lone Star State of Mind (film) =

2002 film

- Directed by: David Semel
- Screenplay by: Trevor Munson
- Produced by: Marshall Herskovitz; Edward Zwick; Richard Solomon
- Starring: Joshua Jackson; Jaime King; Matthew Davis
- Cinematography: Michael Barrett
- Edited by: Christopher Cooke
- Music by: Tyler Bates
- Production companies: Screen Gems; The Bedford Falls Company
- Distributed by: Sony Pictures Motion Picture Group
- Release date: December 13, 2002 (United States)
- Running time: 88 minutes
- Country: United States
- Language: English

Lone Star State of Mind is a 2002 American teen crime comedy film directed by David Semel. It stars Joshua Jackson, Jaime King, Matthew Davis, Ryan Hurst and DJ Qualls. It follows a Texas car mechanic who gets involved in a drug-related money larceny.

== Plot ==
Earl is a small-town vehicle repairman who lives with his mother, step-father and step-sister Baby to whom he is engaged. His best friend is a fellow car mechanic Jimbo who is an openly gay cowboy. Baby is intent on leaving Texas for Los Angeles to be an actress. When Baby's misfit cousin Junior and his recently released ex-con friend Tinker rob a pizza delivery boy and end up with $20,000 of drug money, Baby forces Earl to look after Junior and make things right. Earl must decide between giving up his and Baby's Los Angeles money or saving Junior's limbs from a drug dealer.

== Cast ==
- Joshua Jackson as Jesus "Earl" Crest
- Jaime King as Baby
- Matthew Davis as Jimbo
- Ryan Hurst as Tinker
- John Mellencamp as Wayne
- DJ Qualls as Junior
- Sam McMurray as Mr. Smith
- Thomas Haden Church as Killer
- Julian Dulce Vida as Vasquez
- Elizabeth Barondes as Smyrna
- Rodger Boyce as Sheriff Andy
