= Bedford Falls Productions =

US film and TV production company

- Company type: Production company
- Industry: Film and Television production
- Founded: 1985; 41 years ago
- Founders: Marshall Herskovitz; Edward Zwick
- Products: Films and television shows

Bedford Falls Productions or The Bedford Falls Company is an American production company founded in 1985 by Marshall Herskovitz and Edward Zwick. Under the banner, they created television shows like Thirtysomething, Once and Again, and My So-called Life produced movies Legends of the Fall, Blood Diamond and the Academy Award-winning films Shakespeare in Love and Traffic.

In honor of the movie It's a Wonderful Life (1946), the Bedford Falls Company was named after the film's fictional town. An overhead view of a facsimile of the Bailey household appears in the production logo, which also features a couple of people singing the last line of "Buffalo Gals" (a song featured in the movie), "...and dance by the light of the moon."

== Credits ==
- Sawdust (Unsold TV pilot, 1987)
- Thirtysomething (TV series, 1987)
- Extreme Close-Up (TV film, 1990)
- My So-Called Life (TV series, 1994)
- Legends of the Fall (Film, 1994)
- Relativity (TV series, 1996)
- HIStory (Short Film, 1996)
- The Player (1997)
- Astoria (1998)
- Dangerous Beauty (Film, 1998)
- The Siege (Film, 1998)
- Shakespeare in Love (Film, 1998)
- Once and Again (TV series, 1999)
- The Only Living Boy in New York (2000)
- Traffic (Film, 2000)
- I Am Sam (Film, 2001)
- The Poof Point (TV film, 2001)
- Abandon (Film, 2002)
- Lone Star State of Mind (Film, 2002)
- Women vs. Men (2002)
- The Last Samurai (2003)
- 1/4life (2005)
- Blood Diamond (Film, 2006)
- Quarterlife (TV-series, 2007)
- Love & Other Drugs (Film, 2010)
- Nashville (TV series, 2016-2018)
- Woman Walks Ahead (Film, 2017)
