= Relativity (TV series) =

American drama television series

- Genre: Drama
- Created by: Jason Katims
- Starring: Kimberly Williams; David Conrad; Jane Adams; Randall Batinkoff; Cliff De Young; Lisa Edelstein; Adam Goldberg; Devon Gummersall; Robert Katims; Poppy Montgomery; Richard Schiff; Mary Ellen Trainor
- Composer: W. G. Snuffy Walden
- Country of origin: United States
- Original language: English
- No. of seasons: 1
- No. of episodes: 17

Production
- Executive producers: Edward Zwick; Marshall Herskovitz
- Running time: 60 minutes
- Production companies: The Bedford Falls Company; 20th Century Fox Television

Original release
- Network: ABC
- Release: September 24, 1996 – April 14, 1997

Relativity is an American drama television series which followed a twenty-something couple, Isabel Lukens (Kimberly Williams) and Leo Roth (David Conrad), and the lives and loves of their friends and siblings in Los Angeles. The ABC series was created by Edward Zwick and Marshall Herskovitz. The series ran on ABC from September 24, 1996 until April 14, 1997; it was canceled after 17 episodes due to low ratings. The first open-mouth kiss between two women on prime time television occurred on the show in 1997.

== Cast ==
- Kimberly Williams as Isabel Lukens
- David Conrad as Leo Roth
- Jane Adams as Karen Lukens
- Randall Batinkoff as Everett
- Cliff De Young as David Lukens
- Lisa Edelstein as Rhonda Roth
- Adam Goldberg as Doug
- Devon Gummersall as Jake Roth
- Robert Katims as Hal Roth
- Poppy Montgomery as Jennifer Lukens
- Richard Schiff as Barry Roth
- Mary Ellen Trainor as Eve Lukens

== Episodes ==
No.	Title	Directed by	Written by	Original release date	Prod. code
1	"Pilot"	Mark Piznarski	Jason Katims	September 24, 1996	4H79
2	"Just One More Thing"	Michael W. Watkins	Jason Katims	September 28, 1996	4H01
3	"First Impressions"	Todd Holland	Ellen Herman	October 5, 1996	4H02
4	"The Unveiling"	Mark Piznarski	Ellen Triedman & Jason Katims	October 12, 1996	4H03
5	"Moving In"	Mark Piznarski	Tim Kazurinsky & Denise Derline and Jan Oxenberg	October 19, 1996	4H04
6	"Fathers"	Davis Guggenheim	Ellen Herman	October 26, 1996	4H05
7	"No Job Too Small"	Dennie Gordon	Jan Oxenberg	November 2, 1996	4H06
8	"Jake Gets a Job"	Patrick R. Norris	Victor Bumbalo	November 9, 1996	4H07
9	"Jealousy"	Arvin Brown	Carole Real & Jason Katims	November 23, 1996	4H08
10	"Role Model"	Mark Piznarski	Ellen Herman	December 14, 1996	4H09
11	"Unsilent Night"	Edward Zwick	Jan Oxenberg	December 21, 1996	4H11
12	"New Year's Eve"	Patrick R. Norris	Ellen Herman	January 4, 1997	4H12
13	"The Day the Earth Moved"	Steve Miner	Jan Oxenberg	January 11, 1997	4H13
14	"Billable Hours"	Matt Reeves	Amanda Marks & Jason Katims	January 18, 1997	4H10
15	"Karen and Her Sisters"	Mark Piznarski	Jason Katims	March 31, 1997	4H14
16	"Valentine's Day"	Michael Fields	Ellen Herman	April 7, 1997	4H15
17	"Hearts and Bones"	Mark Piznarski	Jason Katims	April 14, 1997	4H16
