= Barret Swatek =

American actress and comedian (born 1977)

- Born: March 3, 1977 (age 49); Birmingham, Alabama, U.S.
- Occupation: Actress
- Years active: 1997–present

Barret Swatek (born March 3, 1977) is an American actress and comedian who has appeared in films such as Lethal Weapon 4, The 40-Year-Old Virgin, and High School. She has also made guest appearances on television shows such as Just Shoot Me!, American Dad!, and 2 Broke Girls, and recurred as teacher Ms. Sommers on 10 Things I Hate About You. She played resident bad girl gone good, Cheryl, on the WB series 7th Heaven for three seasons, and played the role of Brittany on the NBC comedy series Quarterlife. Swatek played the character Ally Saxton for 5 seasons on the MTV comedy series Awkward. She currently recurs on American Housewife as Sage and Yellowstone as Victoria Jenkins.

== Early life ==
Swatek was born in Birmingham, Alabama on March 3, 1977 where she pursued competitive figure skating until she was 12 years old. She took part in community theater and studied film in college. She started college at the University of Arizona and finished with a degree in film at Loyola Marymount University.

== Career ==
Swatek's first minor role was on the 1997 television show Power Rangers: Turbo. She continued to have guest starring roles on series Just Shoot Me! before landing a major role as Cheryl on 7th Heaven from 2000 to 2003. She then had a small appearance in The 40-Year-Old Virgin and a recurring role on the television series Quarterlife in 2008. In 2009 and 2010, she appeared on the television series 10 Things I Hate About You as Ms. Sommers and continued that role into the series's second season. She appeared in the 2010 comedy films High School and Barry Munday. In 2011, Swatek was cast on MTV's Awkward as Ally Saxton which ran until 2016. Swatek wrote and starred in two web series, Dating for Dumbasses on Funny or Die and My Two Fans on KoldCast TV. She played Sage on ABC's American Housewife for 5 Seasons. In 2017-2018 she played Victoria Jenkins on TV series Yellowstone. In 2025 she moved to Alabama from Hawaii to be closer to her parents.

== Filmography ==
Film
Year	Title	Role
1998	Lethal Weapon 4	Nurse
2001	On Edge	Veda Tilman
2005	The 40-Year-Old Virgin	Bar girl
2010	High School	Female news desk reporter
2010	Barry Munday	Lucy

Television
Year	Title	Role	Notes
1997	Power Rangers Turbo	Vicki	Episode: "The Song of Confusion"
2000–2003	7th Heaven	Cheryl	15 episodes
2000	Just Shoot Me!	Nicole	Episode: "Finch on Ice"
2001	Three Sisters	Sydney	Episode: "Work Related"
2008	Quarterlife	Brittany	4 episodes
2009	American Dad!	Landon's Shopkeeper (voice)	Episode: "Shallow Vows"
2009–2010	10 Things I Hate About You	Ms. Sommers	2 episodes
2011–2016	Awkward	Ally Saxton	Recurring role
2013	2 Broke Girls	Chick lady	Episode: "And Too Little Sleep"
2013	Guys with Kids	Joyce	Episode: "Divorce Party"
2016	2 Broke Girls	Nina Spiegel	2 episodes
2017–2021	American Housewife	Sage	8 episodes
2018	Yellowstone	Victoria Jenkins	2 episodes

Web
Year	Title	Role	Notes
2009	My Two Fans	Kate Maxwell	16 episodes
