= Quarterlife =

American web series

- Genre: Comedy drama
- Created by: Marshall Herskovitz; Edward Zwick
- Developed by: Quarterlife, Inc.
- Written by: Devon Gummersall; Marshall Herskovitz; Lucy Teitler; Edward Zwick
- Directed by: Marshall Herskovitz; Eric Stoltz
- Starring: Bitsie Tulloch; Kevin Christy; Mike Faiola; Scott Michael Foster; Michelle Lombardo; Maïté Schwartz; David Walton
- Composer: W. G. "Snuffy" Walden
- Country of origin: United States
- Original language: English
- No. of seasons: 1
- No. of episodes: 6

Production
- Producers: Marshall Herskovitz; Edward Zwick; Joshua Gummersall
- Cinematography: John O'Shaughnessy; Nicole Hirsch Whitaker
- Editor: Jennifer Pulver
- Running time: Varies
- Production company: The Bedford Falls Company

Original release
- Network: MySpace; Quarterlife.com
- Release: November 11, 2007 – March 9, 2008
- Network: NBC; Bravo
- Release: February 26 – March 9, 2008

Quarterlife (stylized as quarterlife) is an American web series, also briefly an NBC television series in 2008, created by Marshall Herskovitz and Edward Zwick, the creators of Thirtysomething and Once and Again, and producers of My So-Called Life. The show is about a group of twenty-something artists who are coming of age in the digital generation.

Following the dismal reception of the premiere episode of the NBC television show as it coincided with a televised democratic primary debate with President Obama and Hillary Clinton, the other five episodes were aired in a marathon on NBC Universal sibling channel Bravo on March 9, making Quarterlife one of the few television shows to be canceled after one episode.

The regular cast included Bitsie Tulloch, Kevin Christy, Mike Faiola, Scott Michael Foster, Michelle Lombardo, Maïté Schwartz, and David Walton.

== Characters ==
=== Main characters ===
- Dylan Krieger (Bitsie Tulloch) is a self-proclaimed writer who works as an associate editor at a magazine called Attitude. She keeps a video blog on the social networking website Quarterlife.
- Debra Locatelli (Michelle Lombardo) is Dylan's best friend and roommate. She works in her father's appliance store. Debra has anxiety problems.
- Lisa Herford (Maïté Schwartz) shares the apartment with Dylan and Debra. She is in acting school and works as a bartender. Lisa also reluctantly becomes a singer for a band despite her low self-confidence.
- Jed Berland (Scott Michael Foster) is next-door neighbor to the girls and a film maker fresh out of film school.
- Danny Franklin (David Walton) is Jed's business partner and roommate. He is also Debra's ex-boyfriend; Danny and Debra broke up after he cheated on her.
- Andy Melman (Kevin Christy) is Jed and Danny's 'sidekick', assisting them in the production of their videos.
- Eric Greensohn (Mike Faiola) is an old friend of Debra's who comes to visit her and then stays to pursue a relationship with Dylan. Eric is an environmental activist.

=== Other characters ===
- Vanessa (Majandra Delfino) is a free-spirited girl who dates Jed, Andy, and Danny.
- John (O. T. Fagbenle) is a musician who asks Lisa to join his band, and also dates her.
- Brittany (Barret Swatek) is Dylan's boss who has some unresolved feelings towards Dylan.
- Carly (Bree Turner) is a car saleswoman with whom Danny has an affair.
- Josh (Mark Matkevich) is a bartender and co-worker of Lisa.
- Mindy Krieger (Lolita Davidovich) is Dylan's mother.

== Television ==
NBC announced on November 17, 2007 that the network had acquired the rights to air Quarterlife on broadcast television in early 2008, after the episodes have been broadcast on the Internet. In February 2008, NBC announced that Quarterlife would premiere on Tuesday, February 26, 2008, with the show moving to Sunday nights immediately afterwards. The show's first episode earned 3.1 million viewers, falling behind shows on ABC, CBS, and MSNBC in the same time slot and ultimately ranking 17th for the night. After the first episode failed to earn the ratings the network had hoped, NBC announced that the series would be canceled after airing only one episode. Its remaining episodes would air on sibling channel Bravo following the NBC cancellation.

The show's 3.1 million viewer rating was the worst in-season performance in the 10 p.m. hour by an NBC show in at least 17 years. While expected to be successful with teenagers due to its MySpace origins, Quarterlife lost to Bad Girls Club on Oxygen in the teen demographic and tied with the Democratic Presidential debate airing at the same time on sibling channel MSNBC. The show also performed poorly in the adults 18-49 demographic, where it managed only a 1.6 rating.

The series aired on the then-existing E! television system in Canada in simulcast.

== Episodes ==
The first season was released online in 36 parts, each approximately eight minutes, from November 2007 to March 2008. Each eight-minute episode of the series premiered nearly simultaneously on MySpace and the official Quarterlife site. It garnered the third-highest views of any scripted series in Myspace history. These were combined into six hour-long episodes for television.

In five months, total online views for the series—on Myspace, Quarterlife, and YouTube—were over 9 million. After the series was picked up by NBC, some of the hour-long episodes (as edited for broadcast) were made available on the NBC and Hulu websites. During this time, Herskovitz claimed the show accrued an average of 300k views per episode. After cancelation by NBC Episodes 2-6 were broadcast back-to-back on Bravo on March 9, 2008.

=== Television episodes ===
No.	Title	Original release date
1	"Pilot"	February 26, 2008
2	"Compromise"	March 9, 2008
3	"Anxiety"	March 9, 2008
4	"Goodbyes"	March 9, 2008
5	"Finding a Voice"	March 9, 2008
6	"Home Sweet Home"	March 9, 2008

=== Online episodes ===
Episode #	Title	Part 1	Part 2	Part 3	Part 4	Part 5	Part 6
1	"Pilot"	November 11, 2007	November 11, 2007	November 15, 2007	November 18, 2007	November 22, 2007	November 25, 2007
2	"Compromise"	November 29, 2007	December 2, 2007	December 6, 2007	December 9, 2007	December 13, 2007	December 16, 2007
3	"Anxiety"	December 20, 2007	December 23, 2007	December 27, 2007	December 30, 2007	January 3, 2008	January 6, 2008
4	"Goodbyes"	January 10, 2008	January 13, 2008	January 17, 2008	January 20, 2008	January 24, 2008	January 27, 2008
5	"Finding a Voice"	January 31, 2008	February 3, 2008	February 7, 2008	February 10, 2008	February 14, 2008	February 17, 2008
6	"Home Sweet Home"	February 21, 2008	February 24, 2008	February 28, 2008	March 2, 2008	March 6, 2008	March 9, 2008

=== Video blogs ===
Characters in the series posted video blogs on quarterlife.com, Myspace, and YouTube.

Title	Vlogger	Airdate
Storyteller	Andy	October 31, 2007
Hi roommates!	Dylan	November 11, 2007
My first video blog!	Dylan	November 11, 2007
There is no way Brittany is on Myspace, so...	Dylan	November 14, 2007
On Lisa	Dylan	November 14, 2007
Growing up	Dylan	November 17, 2007
My rant about people, money and jobs.	Dylan	November 25, 2007
Sexuality	Dylan	November 25, 2007
I Have A Blog	Andy	November 29, 2007
Choices are scary	Dylan	November 29, 2007
We have a visitor...	Dylan	December 1, 2007
Who's sexiest?	Andy	December 6, 2007
Zoning Out	Dylan	December 6, 2007
LET'S TALK ABOUT SWINGERS	Andy	December 8, 2007
SERIOUSLY DAMAGED	Dylan	December 8, 2007
Dylan Krieger and...	Dylan	December 12, 2007
THE KISS	Dylan	December 16, 2007
INTEGRITY AT 24 FRAMES PER SECOND	Jed	December 16, 2007
The Toyota Commercial	Jed	December 16, 2007
HUNKS OF GLOBAL WARMING	Dylan	December 19, 2007
PEANUT BUTTER AND JELLY, BABY	Andy	December 19, 2007
DATING CHICKS	Jed	December 19, 2007
BLOG ATTEMPT	Danny	December 20, 2007
MESSAGE TO MY SUITORS	Lisa	December 20, 2007
Bathroom	Debra	December 22, 2007
Oh Sigh	Dylan	December 22, 2007
WHY?	Jed	December 22, 2007
I Too Can Blog	Danny	December 23, 2007
