= Maite Schwartz =

American film and television actress (born 1979)

- Born: Dallas, Texas, U.S.
- Education: Carnegie Mellon University (BFA)
- Occupations: Film, television actress

Maite Schwartz is an American film and television actress.

Schwartz was born in Dallas, Texas. She attended Booker T. Washington High School for the Performing and Visual Arts and received her BFA from Carnegie Mellon School of Drama in 2001. Schwartz played Lisa on the online and cable TV series Quarterlife. Between 1999 and 2014 she appeared in roles on various television shows.

== Filmography ==
=== Television ===
Year	Title	Role	Notes
2001	Thieves	Jewelry Clerk	Episode: "The Long Con"
2003	Strong Medicine	Marisa	Episode: "Emergency Contact "
2004	Gilmore Girls	Andrea	Episode: "Luke Can See Her Face"
2005	The Inside	Vickie Armstrong	Episode: "The Perfect Couple"
2005	CSI: Crime Scene Investigation	Kate	Episode: "Room Service"
2006	Dexter	Reporter	Episode: "Truth Be Told"
2007	Medium	Janet	Episode: "Mother's Little Helper"
2008	How I Met Your Mother	Holly	Episode: "The Bracket"
2008	The Mentalist	Jessica Meier-Cardeira	Episode: "Red Handed"
2009	Supernatural	Dr. Cara Roberts	Episode: "Sex and Violence"
2010	Melissa & Joey	Liz	Episode: "Nanny Love"
2010	Hawaii 5-0	Dana Thorpe	Episode: "Lanakila"
2010	CSI: NY	Allison	Episode: "Do Not Pass Go"
2011	House	Bree	Episode: "Carrot or Stick"
2011	Community	Mariah	Episode: "Early 21st Century Romanticism"
2012	Rizzoli & Isles	Celia Jaffe	Episode: "Throwing Down the Gauntlet"
2014	NCIS	Inspector Isabel Chablis	Episode: "The Admiral's Daughter"
2014	Gang Related	Lindsey Manning	Episodes: "La Luz Verde", "Invierno Cayó"

== Interviews ==
- by Amrie Cunningham The TV Addict, "Exclusive Interview: QUARTERLIFE Star Maite Schwartz"

== Reviews ==
- Hinckley, David (February 26, 2008). "Tale of blogger updates young-adult soap opera in 'quarterlife'". NY Dailey News. Archived from the original on February 28, 2008. "...We like the vulnerable Dylan and her vulnerable roomies Debra (Michelle Lombardo) and Lisa (Maite Schwartz)..."
- by Joanne Weintraub, Milwaukee Journal Sentinel, February 23 2008, "'Quarterlife' puts coping on the line", "...and that the other, Lisa (Maite Schwartz), drank too much and was a little slutty...."
- buy Robert Bianco, USA Today, February 25 2008, "Tough to love 'Quarterlife' characters who sing me-me-me so much", "...She lives with actress/singer Lisa (Maite Schwartz) and longtime friend Debra..."
- Pittsburgh Post Gazette, July 29 1999, "...Maite Schwartz, a junior drama student at Carnegie Mellon, has a challenging role as Viola, a young woman shipwrecked off the coast who masquerades as a man..."
