= Love Always, Santa =

2016 American TV program

- Written by: Brian Herzlinger; Jay Black
- Directed by: Brian Herzlinger
- Starring: Marguerite Moreau; Mike Faiola; Brady Smith; Isadora Swann; Jay Black
- Music by: Tony DeSare
- Country of origin: United States
- Original language: English

Production
- Producers: Michael Leahy; Lori Bell Leahy
- Editor: Travis Graalman
- Running time: 84 minutes
- Production company: MarVista Entertainment
- Budget: $500,000

Original release
- Release: November 3, 2016

Love Always, Santa is a 2016 romantic comedy television film first broadcast by Hallmark Movies & Mysteries. It was written by Brian Herzlinger and Jay Black, directed by Herzlinger, and produced by MarVista Entertainment. The film was set in and partially filmed in Northfield, Minnesota.

== Plot ==
The daughter (Isadora Swann) of a widow (Marguerite Moreau) writes to Santa Claus, asking for her mother to find love again. A struggling writer (Mike Faiola), who has taken a job writing responses in Santa's name, receives the letter, and he finds new inspiration and the beginnings of a romance.

== Cast ==
- Marguerite Moreau as Celia
- Mike Faiola as Jake
- Brady Smith as Randy
- Isadora Swann as Lilly
- Jay Black as Hank

== Reception ==
Philip Weyhe of the Northfield News called it "largely enjoyable, rather funny and a good time." Weyhe criticized the film for being sappy and predictable, but praised Swann's and Moreau's performances.

== See also ==
- List of Hallmark Channel Original Movies
