= Mike Faiola =

American actor

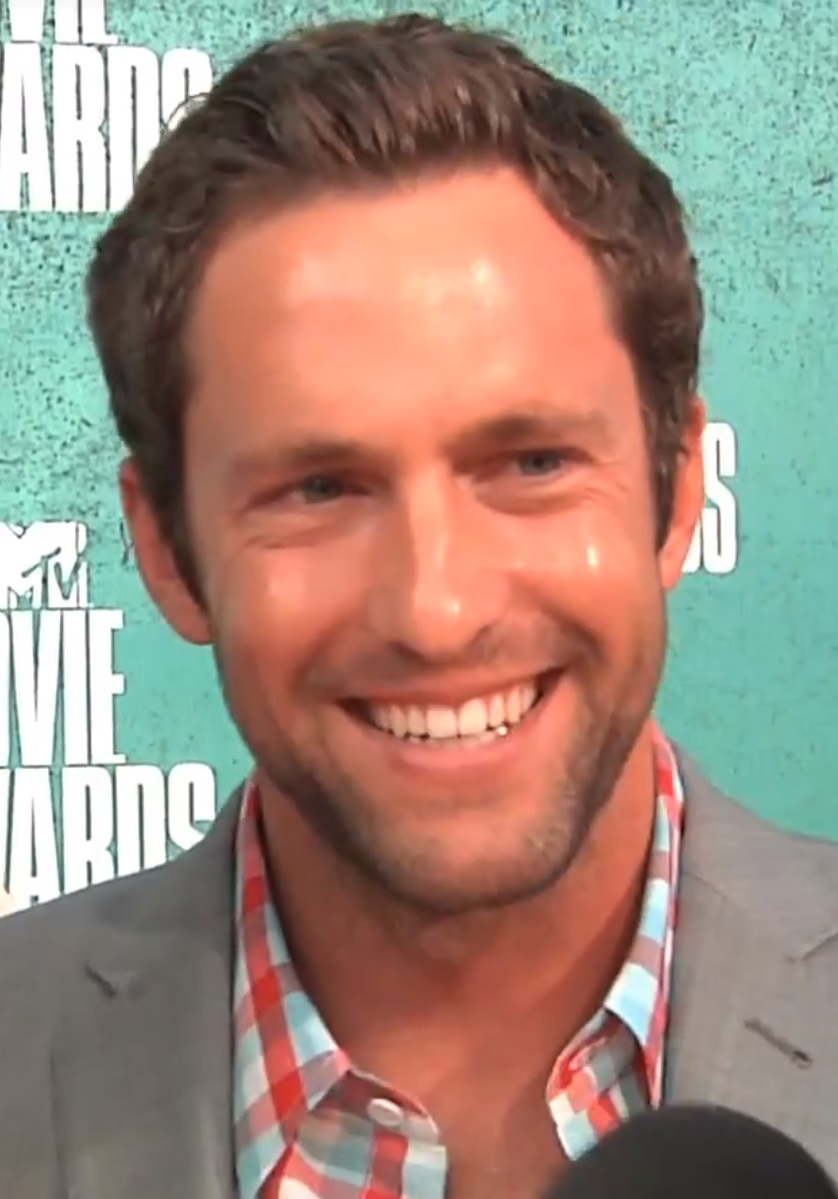
- Faiola interviewed at the MTV Movie Awards 2012
- Born: August 20, 1978; United States
- Occupation: Actor
- Years active: 2002–present

Mike Faiola is an American actor. He is best known for playing the role of Eric in Quarterlife and Kevin Hamilton in Awkward.

== Filmography ==
=== Film ===
Year	Title	Role(s)	Notes
2004	Seeing Other People	Tim	
2005	White Nights	The Lodger	
2006	Two	Nick	Short film
2006	Blood Ranch	Mark	Short film
2008	Shouting Distance	Jay	Short film
2008	Beverly Hills Chihuahua	Josh	Uncredited
2009	My Two Fans	Mark	
2010	Chump	Reed	Short film
2015	Danger Fetish	Chris	Short film
2016	Everything But a Man	Doug	
2017	Star Names Only	Orion	Short film
2018	Dying for the Crown	Rob	
2020	The Last Days of Capitalism	Man	
2020	I Will Make You Mine	Josh	

=== Television ===
Year	Title	Role(s)	Notes
2002	Fantasy Island		TV movie
2005	Grey's Anatomy	Guy	Episode: "Thanks for the Memories"
2006	CSI: Miami	Billie	Episode: "Skeletons"
2007	Ugly Betty	Mailroom boy	Episode: "Swag"
2008	Quarterlife	Eric	6 episodes
2008	Valentine	Roland Sharpey	Episode: "Pilot"
2010	Miami Medical	Brandon Carp	Episode: "Diver Down"
2010	Modern Family	James	Episode: "Halloween"
2011	Happily Divorced	Hot Guy	Episode: "Pillow Talk"
2011-2016	Awkward	Kevin Hamilton	55 episodes
2012	Castle	Paul Morton	Episode: "A Dance with Death"
2014	CSI: Crime Scene Investigation	Officer Blake Hughes	Episode: "The Fallen"
2014	Awkward. Webisodes	Kevin Hamilton	2 episodes
2014	Drop Dead Diva	Dave	2 episodes
2014	Almost Asian	Brad	Episode: "Beauty"
2015	Bones	Joel Brown	Episode: "The Resurrection in the Remains"
2015	Fatal Flip	Nate	TV movie
2016	Love Always, Santa	Jake	TV movie
2017	Star Names Only	Orion	TV movie
2017	Psycho In-Law	Brock	TV movie
2017	Deadly Delusion	Shane	TV movie
2018	Reunited at Christmas	Simon	TV movie
2018	Yellowstone	Dr. Fielding	Episode: "A Monster Is Among Us"
2019	Criminal Minds	J.P. McCoy	Episode: "Night Lights"
