= Edward Zwick =

American filmmaker and producer

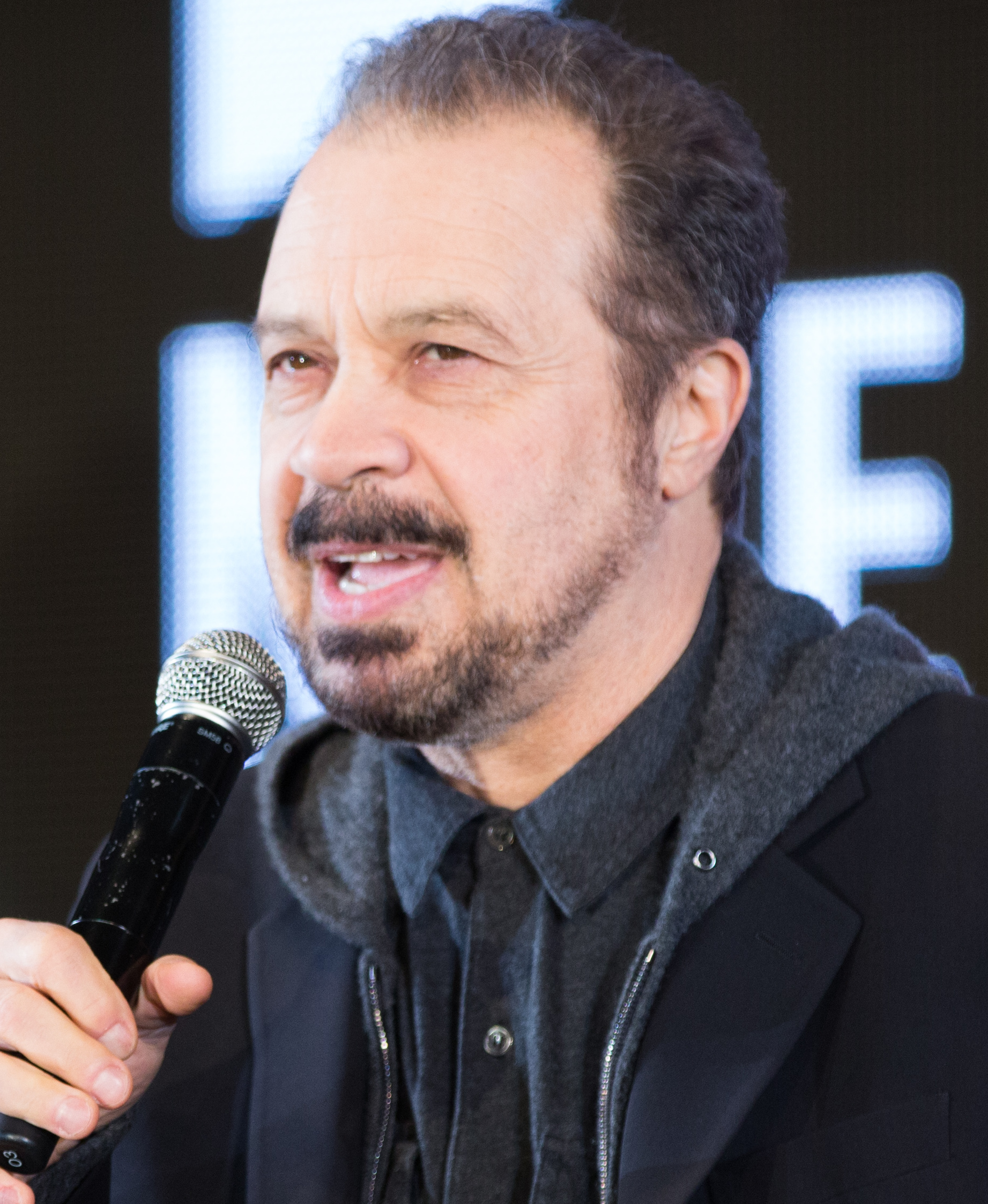
- Zwick in 2016
- Born: Edward M. Zwick; October 8, 1952 (age 74); Chicago, Illinois, U.S.
- Education: Harvard University (BA); AFI Conservatory (MFA)
- Occupations: Director, producer, screenwriter
- Years active: 1979–present
- Notable work: About Last Night, Glory, Legends of the Fall, The Last Samurai, Blood Diamond, Defiance, Love & Other Drugs
- Spouse: Lynn Liberty Godshall (m. 1982)

Edward M. Zwick (born October 8, 1952) is an American filmmaker. He has worked primarily in the comedy drama and epic historical film genres and received an Academy Award and a BAFTA Award for his work producing Shakespeare in Love (1998).

He made his film debut with the comedy About Last Night (1986), followed by Glory (1989), Legends of the Fall (1994), Courage Under Fire (1996), The Siege (1998), The Last Samurai (2003), Blood Diamond (2006), and Defiance (2008). His later films include Love & Other Drugs (2010), Pawn Sacrifice (2014), and Jack Reacher: Never Go Back (2016).

He is also the co-creator of the ABC family drama series thirtysomething and Once and Again.

== Early life and education ==
Zwick was born on October 8, 1952, into a Jewish family in Chicago, Illinois, the son of Ruth Ellen (née Reich) and Allen Zwick. He attended New Trier High School, received a B.A. at Harvard in 1974, and graduated from the AFI Conservatory with a Master of Fine Arts degree in 1975.

Despite sharing a surname and profession, Edward is unrelated to fellow director Joel Zwick. He has been married to actress Liberty Godshall since 1982, and they have two grown children.

== Career ==
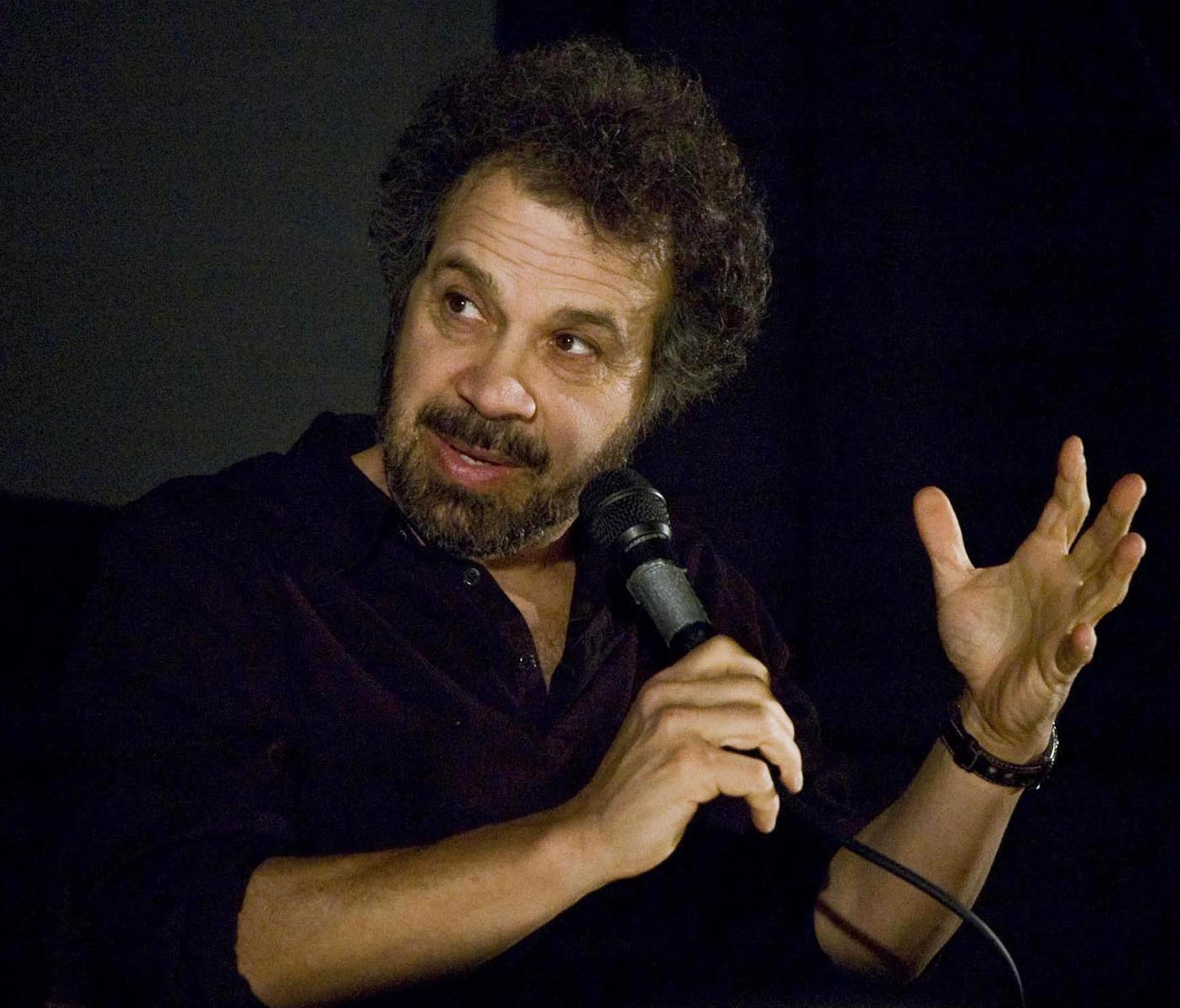
Zwick in 2008

His films include Glory (1989), Legends of the Fall (1994), The Siege (1998), The Last Samurai (2003), Blood Diamond (2006), and Defiance (2008). Along with Marshall Herskovitz, Zwick runs The Bedford Falls Company (named after the town in Frank Capra's It's a Wonderful Life). The film production company has produced such films as Traffic and Shakespeare in Love and the TV shows thirtysomething, Relativity, Once and Again, and My So-Called Life.

Zwick's body of work has earned numerous accolades, including an Academy Award and BAFTA Award for Best Picture as a producer, and Primetime Emmy Awards for Outstanding Drama Series, Outstanding Writing in a Limited Series, and Outstanding Dramatic Special. He was one of the recipients of the Academy Award for Best Picture for Shakespeare in Love; he was also nominated in the same category for Traffic. He has also been nominated for multiple Golden Globe Awards.

In 2024, Zwick released his memoir, Hits, Flops, and Other Illusions: My Fortysomething Years in Hollywood.

== Filmography ==
=== Film ===
Year	Title	Director	Producer	Writer
1986	About Last Night...	Yes	No	No
1989	Glory	Yes	No	No
1992	Leaving Normal	Yes	No	No
1994	Legends of the Fall	Yes	Yes	No
1996	Courage Under Fire	Yes	No	No
1998	The Siege	Yes	Yes	Yes
2003	The Last Samurai	Yes	Yes	Yes
2006	Blood Diamond	Yes	Yes	No
2008	Defiance	Yes	Yes	Yes
2010	Love & Other Drugs	Yes	Yes	Yes
2014	Pawn Sacrifice	Yes	Yes	No
2016	Jack Reacher: Never Go Back	Yes	No	Yes
2016	The Great Wall	No	No	Story
2017	American Assassin	No	No	Yes
2018	Trial by Fire	Yes	Yes	No
2027	Asymmetry	Yes	Yes	Yes

Producer only

- Dangerous Beauty (1998)
- Shakespeare in Love (1998)
- Traffic (2000)
- I Am Sam (2001)
- Abandon (2002)
- Cut Bank (2014)
- Woman Walks Ahead (2017)

Executive producer

- Lone Star State of Mind (2002)
- Boys of Abu Ghraib (2014)
- About Alex (2014)
- The Birth of a Nation (2016)

=== Television ===
Year	Title	Director	Writer	Executive Producer	Creator	Notes
1979–80	Family	Yes	Yes	No	No	Also producer; 5 episodes (written); Directed episode "Ballerina"
1985	The Insiders	Yes	No	No	No	Pilot episode
1987–91	thirtysomething	Yes	Yes	Yes	Yes	3 episodes (directed); 8 episodes (written)
1999–2002	Once and Again	Yes	Yes	Yes	Yes	3 episodes (directed); 4 episodes (written); Also actor (as Dr. Daniel Rosenfeld)
2008	Quarterlife	No	Yes	Yes	Yes	Web series; 2 episodes (written)
2016–18	Nashville	No	Yes	Yes	No	Wrote episode "The Wayfaring Stranger"
2020	Away	Yes	No	Yes	No	Directed episode "Go"

Television films

Year	Title	Director	Writer	Producer
1982	Paper Dolls	Yes	No	No
1982	Having It All	Yes	No	No
1983	Special Bulletin	Yes	Yes	Yes
1990	Extreme Close-Up	No	Story	executive
2009	A Marriage	No	Yes	executive
2020	Thirtysomething(else)	Yes	Yes	No

Executive producer only

Year	Title	Notes
1987	CBS Summer Playhouse	Episode "Sawdust"
1989	Dream Street	
1994-95	My So-Called Life	
1998	Relativity	
2000	The Only Living Boy in New York	TV movie
2000	The Poof Point	TV movie
2002	Women vs. Men	TV movie

== Awards and nominations ==
Year	Title	Award/Nomination
1989	Glory	Nominated - Golden Globe Award for Best Director
1994	Legends of the Fall	Nominated - Golden Globe Award for Best Director
1998	Shakespeare in Love	Academy Award for Best Picture; BAFTA Award for Best Film; Satellite Award for Best Motion Picture, Comedy or Musical; Nominated - Producers Guild of America Award for Best Theatrical Motion Picture
2000	Traffic	Nominated - Academy Award for Best Picture
2003	The Last Samurai	National Board of Review Award for Best Director; Nominated - Saturn Award for Best Director; Nominated - Producers Guild of America Award for Best Picture
2006	Blood Diamond	Nominated - St. Louis Gateway Film Critics Award for Best Director

Awards received by Zwick films
Year	Title	Academy Awards		BAFTA Awards		Golden Globe Awards	
Year	Title	Nominations	Wins	Nominations	Wins	Nominations	Wins
1989	Glory	5	3	1		5	1
1994	Legends of the Fall	3	1			4	
2003	The Last Samurai	4				3	
2006	Blood Diamond	5				1	
2008	Defiance	1				1	
2010	Love & Other Drugs					2	
Total		18	4	1	0	16	1

Directed Academy Award performances
Under Zwick's direction, these actors have received Academy Award wins and nominations for their performances in their respective roles.

Year	Performer	Film	Result
Academy Award for Best Actor
2006	Leonardo DiCaprio	Blood Diamond	Nominated
Academy Award for Best Supporting Actor
1989	Denzel Washington	Glory	Won
2003	Ken Watanabe	The Last Samurai	Nominated
2006	Djimon Hounsou	Blood Diamond	Nominated

== Books ==
- Zwick, Ed (February 13, 2024). Hits, Flops, and Other Illusions: My Fortysomething Years in Hollywood. New York: Gallery Books. ISBN 9781668046999. OCLC 1384411519.
