= Siege of Freetown =

1997–1998 battle for Sierra Leone's capital

Battle of Freetown
- Part of the Sierra Leone Civil War
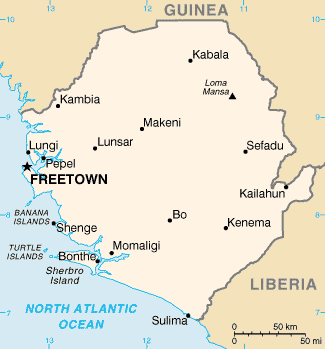
- Map of Sierra Leone
Date	25 May 1997 – 6 February 1998
Location	Sierra Leone, Freetown
Result	ECOMOG victory: Koroma is deposed and Kabbah restored

Belligerents
Sierra Leone: AFRC; RUF	(Sierra Leone) Kabbah loyalists Nigeria (leading ECOMOG forces)

Commanders and leaders
(Sierra Leone) Johnny Paul Koroma; Foday Sankoh	(Sierra Leone) Ahmad Tejan Kabbah (Nigeria) Maxwell Khobe

The siege of Freetown was a battle during the Sierra Leone Civil War. It began when Johnny Paul Koroma took over the power from Ahmad Tejan Kabbah and began a dictatorship. In response, ECOMOG troops, led by Nigeria, helped the Sierra Leone Army to attack and remove Koroma from power and Kabbah was elected back in post. In revenge, Koroma's allies, the RUF, assaulted the city but were forced to retreat.

== In fiction ==
The battle was portrayed in the film Blood Diamond (taking place in 1999, in spite of the RUF take over happening in 1997).
