= Dallas–Fort Worth Film Critics Association Awards 2003 =

Annual US film awards ceremony

9th Dallas-Fort Worth Film Critics Association Awards
- Date: January 5, 2004
- Location: Dallas, Texas
- Country: United States
- Presented by: Dallas-Fort Worth Film Critics Association
- Website: dfwfilmcritics.net

The 9th Dallas–Fort Worth Film Critics Association Awards, honoring the best in film for 2003, were given on January 5, 2004. The organization, founded in 1990, includes 63 film critics for print, radio, television, and internet publications based in north Texas.

== Top 10 films ==
1. The Lord of the Rings: The Return of the King (Academy Award for Best Picture)
2. Cold Mountain
3. Mystic River
4. Lost in Translation
5. Finding Nemo
6. American Splendor
7. In America
8. Big Fish
9. Master and Commander: The Far Side of the World
10. The Last Samurai

== Winners and nominees ==
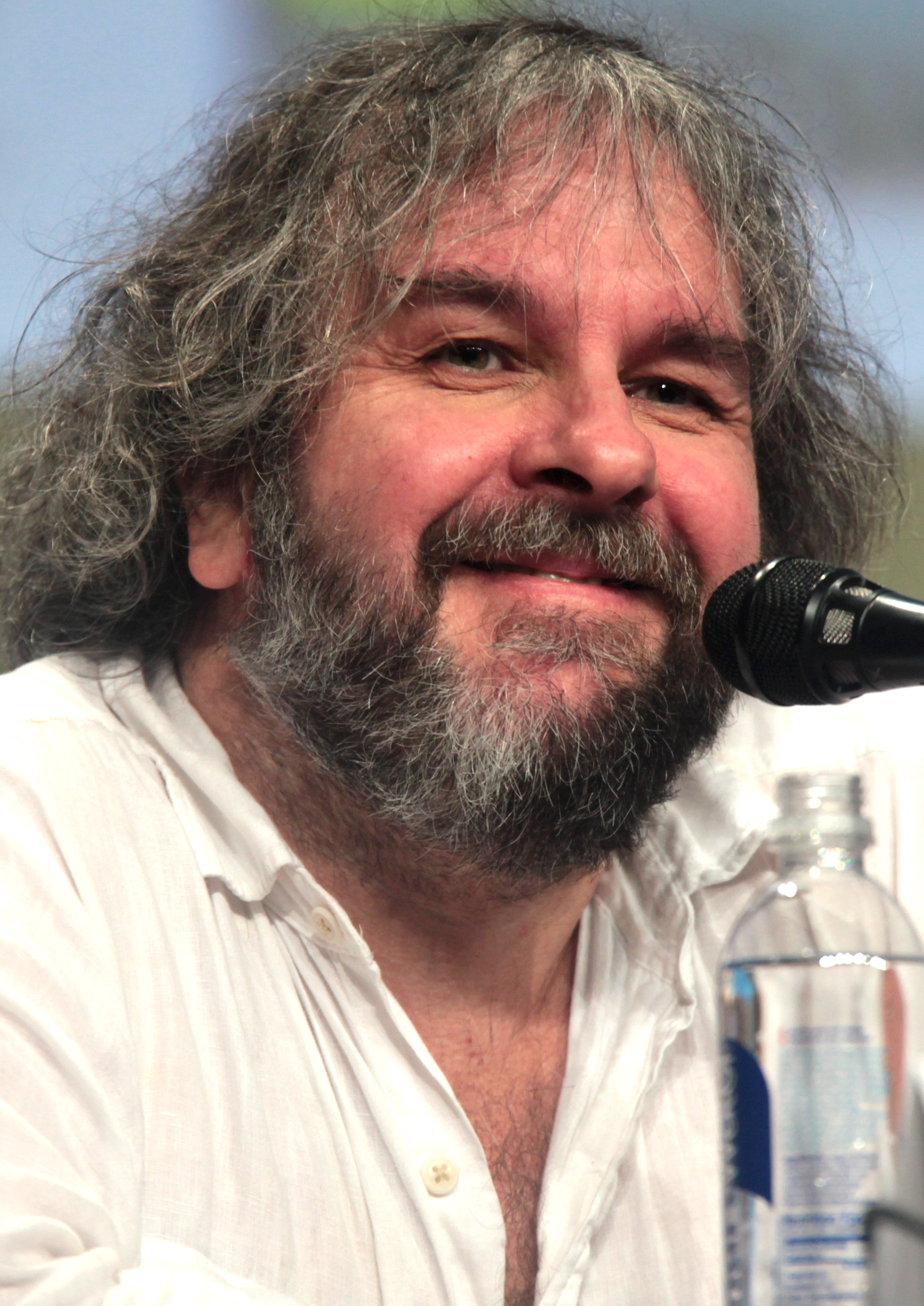
Peter Jackson, Best Director winner

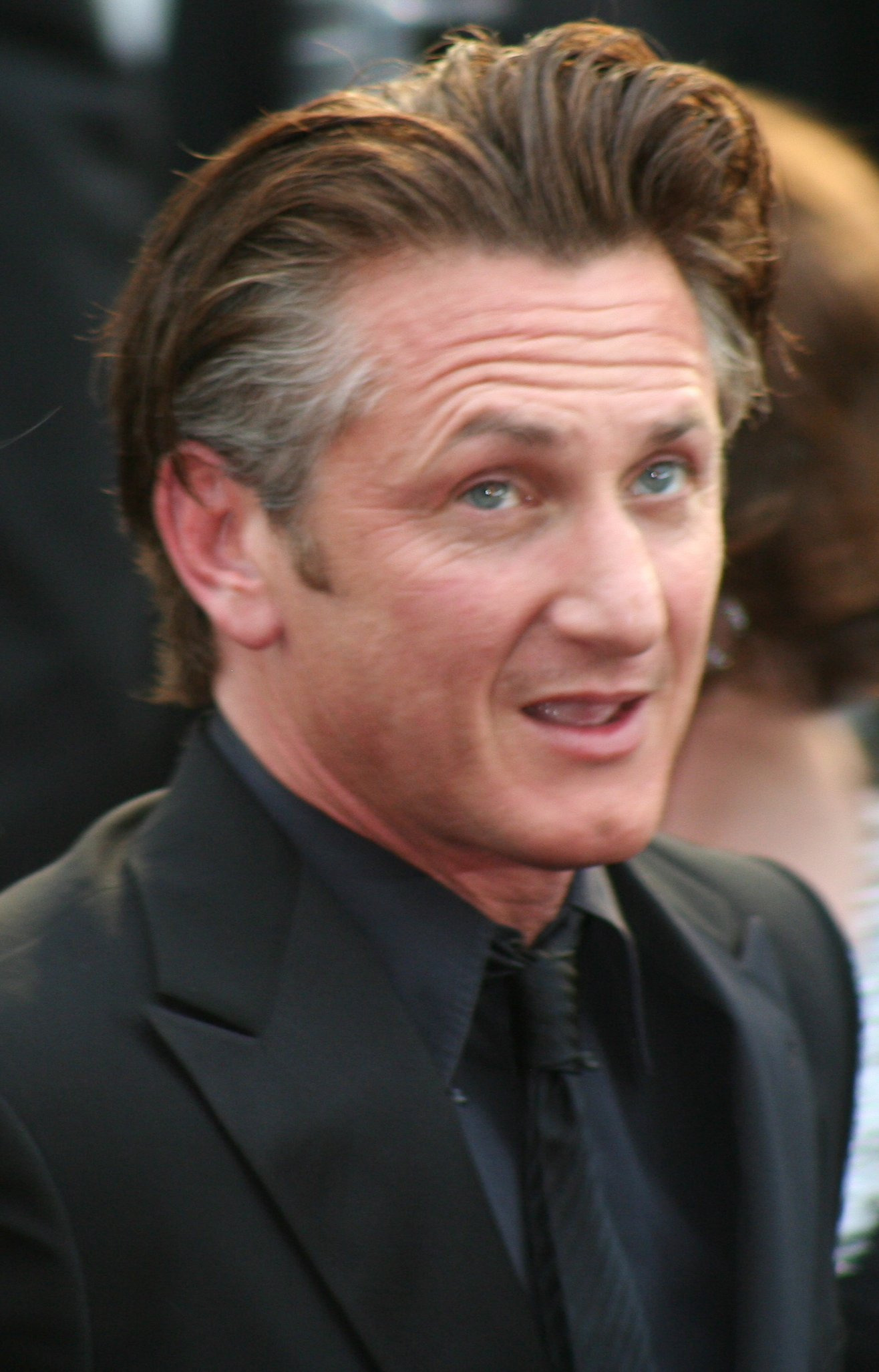
Sean Penn, Best Actor winner

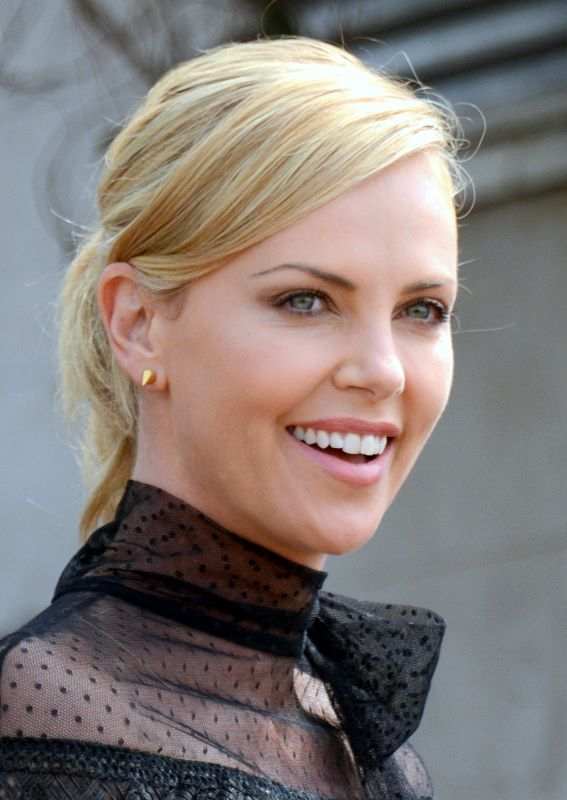
Charlize Theron, Best Actress winner

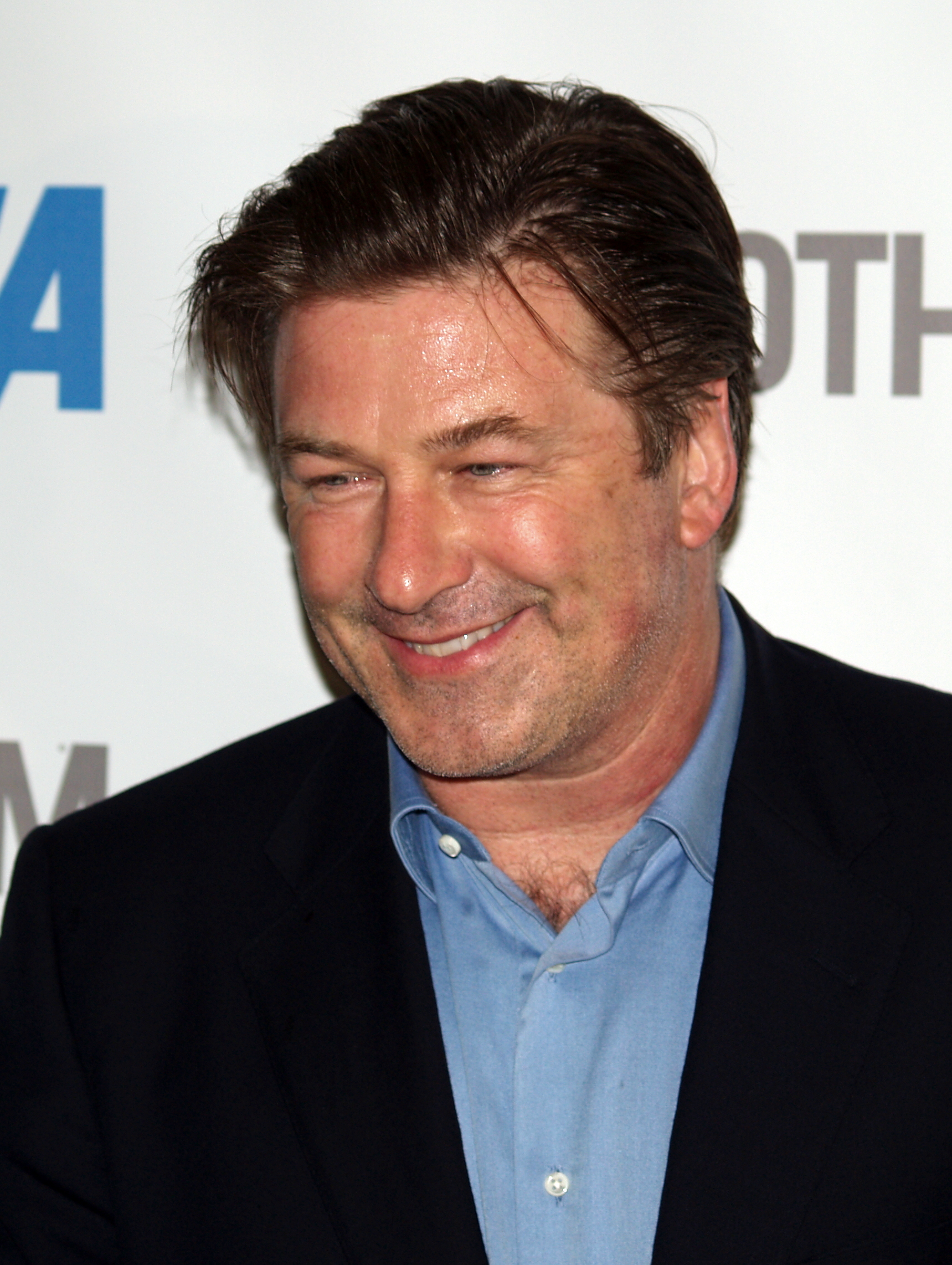
Alec Baldwin, Best Supporting Actor winner

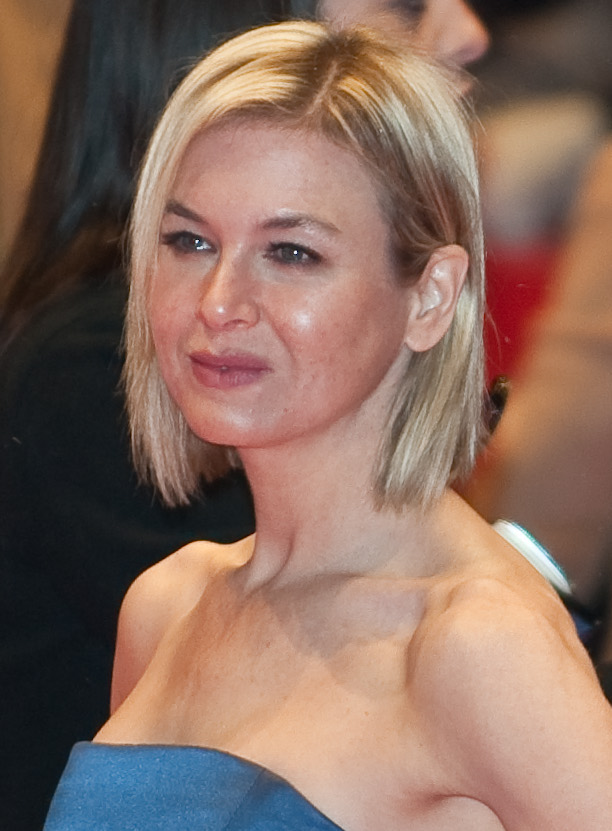
Renée Zellweger, Best Supporting Actress winner

Winners are in bold.

- Best Actor:
  - **Sean Penn – Mystic River**
  - Bill Murray – Lost in Translation
  - Ben Kingsley – House of Sand and Fog
  - Johnny Depp – Pirates of the Caribbean
  - Paul Giamatti – American Splendor
- Best Actress:
  - **Charlize Theron – Monster**
  - Nicole Kidman – Cold Mountain
  - Diane Keaton – Something's Gotta Give
  - Scarlett Johansson – Lost in Translation
  - Naomi Watts – 21 Grams
- Best Animated Film:
  - **Finding Nemo**
- Best Cinematography:
  - **The Lord of the Rings: The Return of the King – Andrew Lesnie**
- Best Director:
  - **Peter Jackson – The Lord of the Rings: The Return of the King**
  - Clint Eastwood – Mystic River
  - Anthony Minghella – Cold Mountain
  - Sofia Coppola – Lost in Translation
  - Tim Burton – Big Fish
- Best Documentary Film:
  - **Capturing the Friedmans**
  - The Fog of War
  - Winged Migration
  - Spellbound
  - To Be and to Have
- Best Foreign Language Film:
  - **City of God (Cidade de Deus), Brazil/France/United States**
  - The Barbarian Invasions (Les Invasions barbares), France/Canada
  - The Triplets of Belleville (Les Triplettes de Belleville), France/Belgium/Canada/UK
  - Together
  - Man on the Train
- Best Supporting Actor:
  - **Alec Baldwin – The Cooler**
  - Tim Robbins – Mystic River
  - Ken Watanabe – The Last Samurai
  - Albert Finney – Big Fish
  - Peter Sarsgaard – Shattered Glass
- Best Supporting Actress:
  - **Renée Zellweger – Cold Mountain**
  - Patricia Clarkson – Pieces of April
  - Marcia Gay Harden – Mystic River
  - Holly Hunter – Thirteen
  - Ludivine Sagnier – Swimming Pool
- Worst Film:
  - The Cat in the Hat
