= Blood Diamond =

2006 American political thriller film by Edward Zwick

- Theatrical release poster
- Directed by: Edward Zwick
- Screenplay by: Charles Leavitt
- Story by: Charles Leavitt; C. Gaby Mitchell
- Produced by: Paula Weinstein; Edward Zwick; Marshall Herskovitz; Graham King; Gillian Gorfil
- Starring: Leonardo DiCaprio; Jennifer Connelly; Djimon Hounsou; Michael Sheen; Arnold Vosloo
- Cinematography: Eduardo Serra
- Edited by: Steven Rosenblum
- Music by: James Newton Howard
- Production companies: Virtual Studios; Spring Creek Pictures; Bedford Falls Productions; Initial Entertainment Group
- Distributed by: Warner Bros. Pictures
- Release date: December 8, 2006 (United States)
- Running time: 143 minutes
- Country: United States
- Language: English
- Budget: $100 million
- Box office: $171.7 million

Blood Diamond is a 2006 American war drama film directed and co-produced by Edward Zwick and starring Leonardo DiCaprio, Jennifer Connelly and Djimon Hounsou. The title refers to blood diamonds, which are diamonds mined in war zones and sold to finance conflicts, thereby profiting warlords and diamond companies around the world.

Set during the Sierra Leone Civil War, the film depicts a country torn apart by the struggle between government loyalists and insurgent forces. It also portrays many of the atrocities of that war, including the rebels' amputation of civilians' hands to discourage them from voting in upcoming elections. The film's ending, in which a conference is held concerning blood diamonds, refers to a historic meeting that took place in Kimberley, South Africa, in 2000. It led to development of the Kimberley Process Certification Scheme, which sought to certify the origin of rough diamonds to curb the trade in conflict diamonds; the certification scheme has been mostly abandoned as ineffective.

Blood Diamond was released by Warner Bros. Pictures on December 8, 2006. The film received positive reviews, with praise directed toward the performances of DiCaprio and Hounsou. The film grossed $171.7 million worldwide against a $100 million budget and received five Oscar nominations, including Best Actor for DiCaprio and Best Supporting Actor for Hounsou. DiCaprio received a nomination for a Golden Globe Award for Best Actor – Motion Picture Drama (also nominated that year in the same category for The Departed). In addition, DiCaprio and Hounsou were nominated for Outstanding Male Actor in a Leading Role and Outstanding Male Actor in a Supporting Role at the 13th Screen Actors Guild Awards.

== Plot ==
In 1999, Sierra Leone is ravaged by civil war. The Revolutionary United Front terrorizes the countryside and enslaves many locals to harvest diamonds, which fund their increasingly successful war effort. Solomon Vandy, a Mende fisherman from Shenge, is separated from his family and assigned to a workforce overseen by Captain Poison, a ruthless warlord.

While mining a river, Vandy discovers an enormous pink diamond. Captain Poison tries to take the stone, but the area is suddenly raided by government troops. Vandy buries the stone before being captured. Vandy and Poison are incarcerated in Freetown with Danny Archer, a white Rhodesian gunrunner and Angola War veteran jailed for trying to smuggle diamonds into Liberia. The diamonds were intended for Rudolph van de Kaap, a corrupt Afrikaner mining executive from South Africa.

Hearing of the pink diamond in prison, Archer arranges for him and Vandy to be freed. He travels to Cape Town to meet his employer: Colonel Coetzee, an Afrikaner formerly with the apartheid-era South African Defence Force (whom Archer also served under in the 32 Battalion), which now commands a private military company. Archer wants the diamond so he can sell it to Van de Kaap and retire, but Coetzee wants it as compensation for Archer's botched smuggling mission. Archer returns to Sierra Leone, locates Vandy, and offers to help him find his family if he will help recover the diamond.

The RUF conquers Freetown, while Vandy's son Dia is captured to serve as a child soldier under a liberated Captain Poison. Archer and Vandy narrowly escape to Lungi, where they plan to reach Kono with the help of an American journalist, Maddy Bowen, in exchange for Archer providing evidence of the illicit diamond trade. Maddy helps Vandy locate his remaining family at a refugee camp in Guinea. While they travel, Archer reveals to Maddy that his parents were brutally killed by Black rebels after the fall of Rhodesia (now Zimbabwe). As a child, he fled to South Africa, where he eventually joined the military and served in Angola. Eventually, the trio arrive in Kono after a harrowing journey, where Coetzee and his private army—contracted by the Sierra Leone government—prepares to repulse the rebel offensive.

While Maddy gets out with her story, the two men set out for Captain Poison's encampment. Dia, stationed with the RUF garrison there, is confronted by Vandy, but having been brainwashed he refuses to acknowledge his father. Archer radios the site's coordinates to Coetzee, who directs a combined air and ground assault on the camp. Vandy finds Captain Poison and beats him to death with a shovel as the mercenaries overwhelm the RUF defenders.

Coetzee then forces Vandy to produce the diamond, but is killed by Archer, who realizes Coetzee would eventually kill them both. Dia briefly holds the pair at gunpoint, but Vandy confronts him again and renews their familial bond. Pursued by vengeful mercenaries, Archer discloses he has been mortally wounded and entrusts the stone to Vandy, telling him to take it for his family. Vandy and his son rendezvous with Archer's pilot, who flies them to safety while Archer makes a final phone call to Maddy; they share final farewells as he asks her to assist Vandy, and gives her permission to finish her article. Archer finally takes in the beautiful African landscape before dying.

Vandy arrives in London and meets with a van de Kaap representative; he exchanges the pink diamond for a large sum of money and being reunited with his entire family. Maddy takes photographs of the deal to publish in her article on the diamond trade, exposing van de Kaap's criminal actions. Vandy appears as a guest speaker at a conference on "blood diamonds" in Kimberley, and is met with a standing ovation.

== Cast ==
- Leonardo DiCaprio as Danny Archer
- Jennifer Connelly as Maddy Bowen
- Djimon Hounsou as Solomon Vandy
- Kagiso Kuypers as Dia Vandy
- Arnold Vosloo as Colonel Coetzee
- David Harewood as Captain Poison
- Antony Coleman as Cordell Brown
- Benu Mabhena as Jassie Vandy
- Anointing Lukola as N'Yanda Vandy
- Basil Wallace as Benjamin Kapanay
- Jimi Mistry as Nabil
- Michael Sheen as Rupert Simmons
- Marius Weyers as Rudolf van de Kaap
- Stephen Collins as Ambassador Walker
- Ntare Mwine as M'Ed
- Ato Essandoh as Commander Rambo
- Tony Kgoroge as Liberian Border Guard
- Nick Reding as DFID Minister
- Adetokumboh M'Cormack as RUF Trainer
- Winston Ntshona as Old Mende
- Gaurav Chopra, David S. Lee, and Jonathan Pienaar as journalists

== Production ==
Charles Leavitt was hired by Warner Bros. Pictures in February 2004 to rewrite an early draft of the film, titled Okavango. The story had been stuck in development hell at the studio for years before producers Paula Weinstein and Gillian Gorfil finally decided on the story of an African farmer caught up in the conflict between an American smuggler and the local diamond-mining organization. Leavitt researched the diamond industry at great length before he began writing the screenplay, explaining that he has "always been a stickler for immersing [himself] in research".

He wrote the film with the assumption it would offend the diamond industry, particularly De Beers, and so made sure to portray the industry truthfully, aware that he could potentially be sued by De Beers and other powerful mining corporations. Paula Weinstein was impressed by Leavitt's Blood Diamond draft, but hired writers Ed Zwick and Marshall Herskovitz to rewrite it. By the time he had completed the script, Zwick had become so interested in the story that he agreed to direct the film as well.

Filming took place on-location in South Africa (Cape Town, Port Edward), Mozambique (Maputo, Goba) and London, England.

David Hasselhoff was offered the lead role of Danny Archer, but he turned it down because he did not like the direction of the character; Leonardo DiCaprio was later given the role.

== Release ==
=== Critical response ===
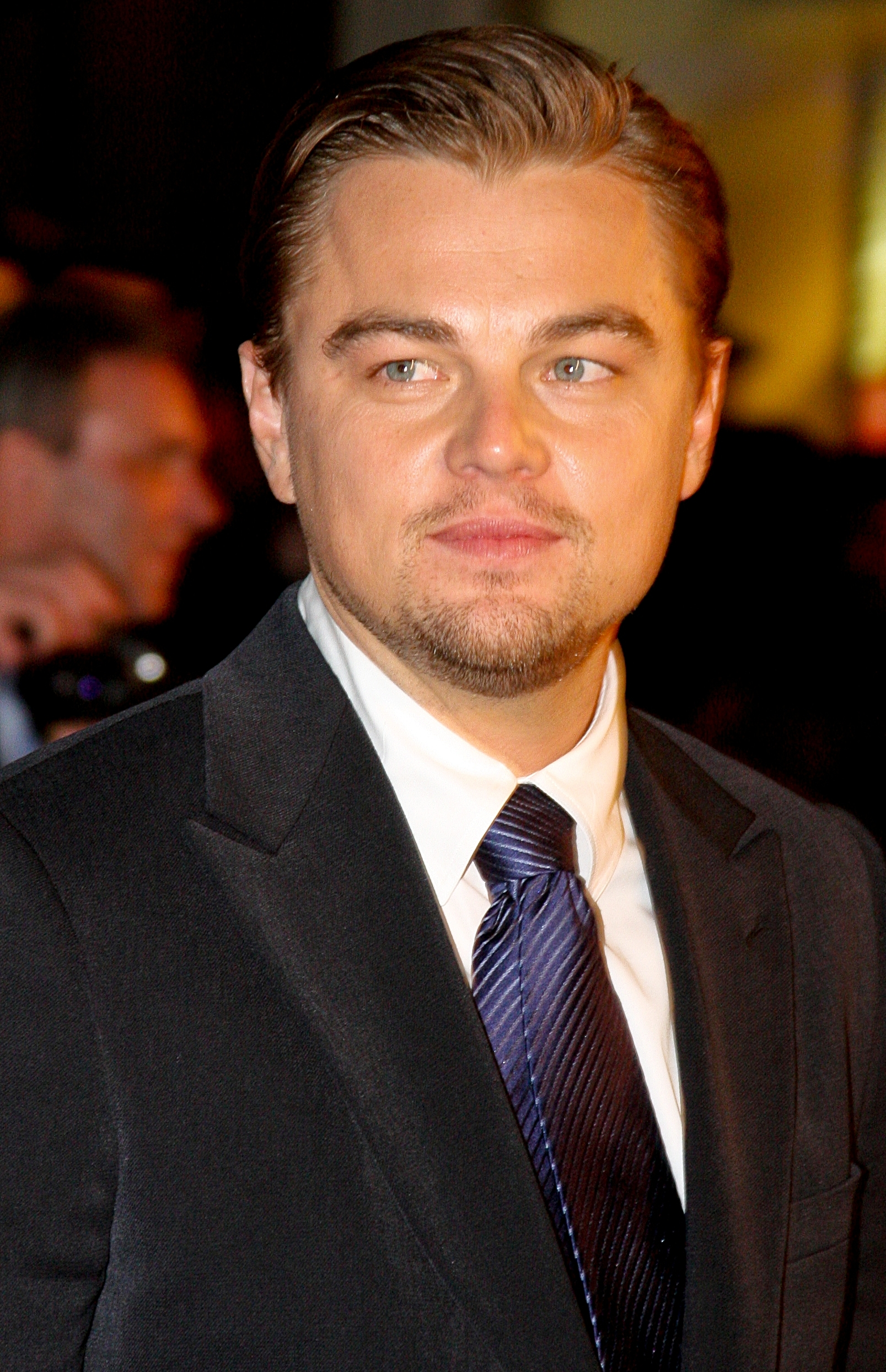
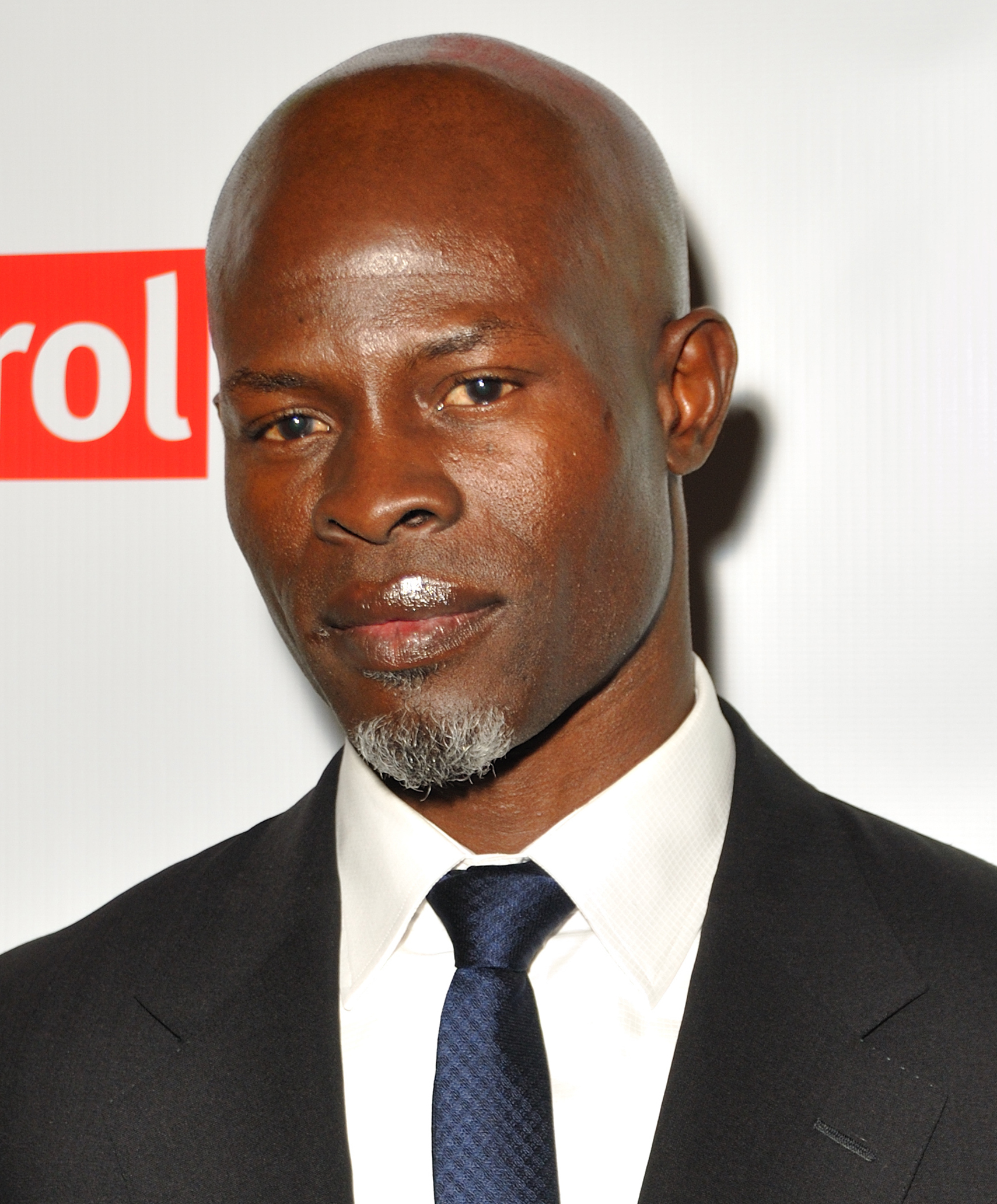
The performances of Leonardo DiCaprio and Djimon Hounsou received critical acclaim, earning them Academy Award nominations for Best Actor and Best Supporting Actor, respectively.

On Rotten Tomatoes, the film has an approval rating of 64%, based on reviews from 214 critics, with an average score of 6.30/10. The site's consensus states: "Blood Diamond overcomes poor storytelling with its biting commentary and fine performances." On Metacritic, it has a weighted average score of 64 out of 100, based on 39 reviews, indicating "generally favorable" reviews. Audiences surveyed by CinemaScore gave the film a grade of A− on a scale from A+ to F.

Claudia Puig of USA Today gave the film a positive review, calling Blood Diamond "a gem in a season with lots of worthy movies". Puig also praised DiCaprio's acting, calling it "the first time the boyish actor has truly seemed like a man on film". Peter Rainer of The Christian Science Monitor also gave the film a positive review, and like Puig, praised DiCaprio's acting: "DiCaprio is remarkable—his work is almost on par with his performance this year in The Departed." William Arnold of the Seattle Post-Intelligencer gave the film a positive review, saying "Zwick's narrative skills keep us hooked on the story, and the first-rate production values and imaginative use of locations (it was shot in Mozambique) give the film an enthralling scope and epic sweep." Damon Wise of Empire magazine gave the film four out of five stars, saying "Great performances, provocative ideas and gripping action scenes fall prey to Hollywood logic and pat storytelling in the final hour." David Edelstein of New York magazine found the film exceeded his expectations: "Given that the movie doesn't have a single narrative surprise—you always know where it's going and why, commercially speaking, it's going there—it's amazing how good Blood Diamond is. I guess that's the surprise." Ann Hornaday of The Washington Post also praised DiCaprio's acting in both Blood Diamond and The Departed (released the same year), saying that he "has undergone a major growth spurt this year". She called the film as a whole "an unusually smart, engaged popcorn flick".

James Berardinelli of the ReelViews gave the film three out of four stars, saying "It's a solid performance from Leonardo DiCaprio, who has grown into this sort of gritty role and is more believable after having been seen dancing on the dark side in The Departed." Dana Stevens of Slate magazine wrote, "Blood Diamond is a by-the-numbers message picture, to be sure... But the director, Edward Zwick, is craftsman enough that the pace never slackens, the chase scenes thrill, and the battle scenes sicken. And if it makes viewers think twice about buying their sweethearts that hard-won hunk of ice for Christmas, so much the better." Ty Burr of The Boston Globe, after giving the film a positive review, stated: "As an entry in the advocacy-entertainment genre, in which glamorous movie stars bring our attention to the plight of the less fortunate, Blood Diamond is superior to 2003's ridiculous Beyond Borders while looking strident and obvious next to last year's The Constant Gardener.

Pete Vonder Haar of the Film Threat gave the film a mixed review, saying, "It's a reasonably entertaining actioner, and Zwick doesn't shy away from depicting violence or the horrors of war, but as a social statement it falls a little short. And emeralds are prettier anyway." Marc Savlov of The Austin Chronicle also gave the film a mixed review: "While the film never quite reaches the emotional peaks it so obviously seeks to scale, Zwick's film is still potent enough to save you three months salary." Nathan Lee of the Village Voice, like Vonder Haar and Savlov, also gave the film a mixed review, suggesting that "De Beers can relax; the only indignation stirred up by Blood Diamond won't be among those who worry about where their jewelry came from, but with audiences incensed by facile politics and bad storytelling". Scott Tobias of The A.V. Club gave the film a C grade: "Much like Zwick's Glory and The Last Samurai, Blood Diamond strives to be an important film while stopping well short of being genuinely provocative and artistically chancy." Mick LaSalle of the San Francisco Chronicle gave the film a negative review, arguing that "director Edward Zwick tried to make a great movie, but somewhere in the process he forgot to make a good one".

=== Box office performance ===
Blood Diamond opened on December 8, 2006, in the United States and Canada in 1,910 theaters. The film ranked at #5 on its opening weekend, accumulating $8,648,324, with a per-theater average of $4,527. The film's five-day gross was $10,383,962.

The film dropped down to #7 on its second weekend, accumulating $6,517,471 in a 24.6% drop from its first weekend, and per-theater average of $3,412. By its third weekend it dropped even more to #12 and made $3,126,379, with its per-theater average being $1,628.

Blood Diamond went on to gross $57,377,916 in the United States and Canada and $114,029,263 overseas. In total, the film grossed $171,407,179 worldwide.

=== Accolades ===
Ceremony	Date of ceremony	Award	Recipient(s)	Result
79th Academy Awards	Feb 25, 2007	Best Actor	Leonardo DiCaprio	Nominated
79th Academy Awards	Feb 25, 2007	Best Supporting Actor	Djimon Hounsou	Nominated
79th Academy Awards	Feb 25, 2007	Best Film Editing	Steven Rosenblum	Nominated
79th Academy Awards	Feb 25, 2007	Best Sound Editing	Lon Bender	Nominated
79th Academy Awards	Feb 25, 2007	Best Sound Mixing	Andy Nelson, Anna Behlmer, Ivan Sharrock	Nominated
Broadcast Film Critics Association Awards 2006	Jan 14, 2007	Best Film		Nominated
Broadcast Film Critics Association Awards 2006	Jan 14, 2007	Best Actor	Leonardo DiCaprio	Nominated
Broadcast Film Critics Association Awards 2006	Jan 14, 2007	Best Supporting Actor	Djimon Hounsou	Nominated
64th Golden Globe Awards	Jan 15, 2007	Best Actor – Motion Picture Drama	Leonardo DiCaprio	Nominated
Dallas–Fort Worth Film Critics Association	Dec 19, 2006	Best Film		Nominated
Dallas–Fort Worth Film Critics Association	Dec 19, 2006	Best Actor	Leonardo DiCaprio	Nominated
Dallas–Fort Worth Film Critics Association	Dec 19, 2006	Best Supporting Actor	Djimon Hounsou	Nominated
Las Vegas Film Critics Society Awards 2006	Dec 18, 2006	Best Supporting Actor	Djimon Hounsou	Won
National Board of Review Awards 2006	Dec 6, 2006	Best Supporting Actor	Djimon Hounsou	Won
Satellite Awards 2006	Dec 18, 2006	Best Actor – Motion Picture Drama	Leonardo DiCaprio	Nominated
13th Screen Actors Guild Awards	Jan 28, 2007	Outstanding Performance by a Male Actor in a Leading Role	Leonardo DiCaprio	Nominated
13th Screen Actors Guild Awards	Jan 28, 2007	Outstanding Performance by a Male Actor in a Supporting Role	Djimon Hounsou	Nominated
Teen Choice Awards	Aug 26, 2007	Choice Movie Actor – Drama	Leonardo DiCaprio (Also for The Departed)	Nominated
Visual Effects Society Awards 2006	Feb 12, 2007	Outstanding Supporting Visual Effects in a Motion Picture	Jeffrey A. Okun, Thomas Boland, Tim Crosbie, Neil Greenberg	Nominated
Washington D.C. Area Film Critics Association Awards 2006	Dec 11, 2006	Best Supporting Actor	Djimon Hounsou	Won

== Music ==
Blood Diamond: Original Motion Picture Soundtrack

Film score by James Newton Howard
- Released: December 19, 2006
- Recorded: 2006
- Genre: Contemporary classical
- Length: 61:26
- Label: Varèse Sarabande
- Producer: James Newton Howard

James Newton Howard chronology
Lady in the Water	Blood Diamond: Original Motion Picture Soundtrack	The Lookout

Professional ratings
Review scores
Source	Rating
SoundtrackNet	3.5/5 stars
AllMusic	4/5 stars

Blood Diamond: Original Motion Picture Soundtrack is the soundtrack to the film of the same name, released on December 19, 2006, by Varèse Sarabande. It was composed by James Newton Howard and won the Soundtrack of the Year award at the 2008 Classic Brit Awards.

=== Soundtrack ===
No.	Title	Length
1.	"Blood Diamond Titles"	1:32
2.	"Crossing the Bridge"	1:41
3.	"Village Attack"	1:52
4.	"RUF Kidnaps Dia"	3:02
5.	"Archer & Solomon Hike"	1:55
6.	"Maddy & Archer"	1:56
7.	"Solomon Finds Family"	2:09
8.	"Fall of Freetown"	4:45
9.	"Did You Bury It?"	1:36
10.	"Archer Sells Diamond"	1:40
11.	"Goodbyes"	2:40
12.	"Your Son is Gone"	1:21
13.	"Diamond Mine Bombed"	4:31
14.	"Solomon's Helping Hand"	1:11
15.	"G8 Conference"	2:36
16.	"Solomon & Archer Escape"	2:12
17.	"I Can Carry You"	1:30
18.	"Your Mother Loves You"	2:24
19.	"Thought I'd Never Call?"	3:56
20.	"London"	2:38
21.	"Solomon Vandy"	2:11
22.	"Ankala" (Performed by Sierra Leone's Refugee All Stars)	4:12
23.	"Baai" (Performed by Emmanuel Jal with Abd El Gadir Salim)	4:37
24.	"When Da Dawgs Come Out to Play" (Performed by Bai Burea, featuring Masta Kent and Bullet Rhymes)	3:19
Total length:		61:26

== Home media ==
Blood Diamond was released on DVD in region 1 format on March 20, 2007. Both a single-disc and a two-disc version were released. The film has sold an estimated 3.6 million DVD units and has grossed $62.7 million in sales.

== See also ==
- Conflict resource – Natural resources sold to fund war
- Resource curse – A phenomenon in which a resource-rich country develops more slowly than others
