= The Last Samurai =

2003 film by Edward Zwick

- Theatrical release poster
- Directed by: Edward Zwick
- Screenplay by: John Logan; Edward Zwick; Marshall Herskovitz
- Story by: Vincent Ward
- Produced by: Marshall Herskovitz; Edward Zwick; Tom Cruise; Paula Wagner; Scott Kroopf; Tom Engelman
- Starring: Tom Cruise; Timothy Spall; Ken Watanabe; Billy Connolly; Tony Goldwyn; Hiroyuki Sanada; Koyuki Kato
- Cinematography: John Toll
- Edited by: Steven Rosenblum; Victor Dubois
- Music by: Hans Zimmer
- Production companies: Warner Bros. Pictures; Radar Pictures; The Bedford Falls Company; Cruise/Wagner Productions; Samurai Pictures, LLC
- Distributed by: Warner Bros. Pictures
- Release dates: November 20, 2003 (Tokyo); December 5, 2003 (United States)
- Running time: 154 minutes
- Country: United States
- Languages: English; Japanese
- Budget: $140 million
- Box office: $456.8 million

The Last Samurai is a 2003 American epic period action drama film directed and produced by Edward Zwick, who also co-wrote the screenplay with John Logan and Marshall Herskovitz from a story devised by Logan. The film stars Tom Cruise, who also produced, along with Timothy Spall, Ken Watanabe, Billy Connolly, Tony Goldwyn, Hiroyuki Sanada, and Koyuki Kato in supporting roles. The film's plot was inspired by the 1877 Satsuma Rebellion, led by Saigō Takamori, and the Westernization of Japan by foreign powers. (Note: In the film the United States is portrayed as the primary force behind the push for Westernization, despite mostly European powers influencing this historically.)

Cruise portrays Nathan Algren, an American captain of the 7th Cavalry Regiment, whose personal and emotional conflicts bring him into contact with samurai warriors in the wake of the Meiji Restoration in 19th century Japan. The character of Algren is very loosely based on Eugène Collache and Jules Brunet, both French Imperial Guard officers who fought alongside Enomoto Takeaki in the earlier Boshin War.

The Last Samurai premiered in Tokyo on November 20, 2003 before being released by Warner Bros. Pictures on December 5, 2003. The film grossed a total of $456.8 million at the box office and became the sixth-highest-grossing film of 2003. It received positive reviews, with praise for the acting, visuals, cinematography and Hans Zimmer's score, but criticism for some of its portrayals. It was nominated for several awards, including four Academy Awards, three Golden Globe Awards, and two National Board of Review Awards.

== Plot ==
In 1876, former U.S. Army Captain Nathan Algren, an alcoholic traumatized by his actions during the American Indian Wars, is asked by his former commanding officer, Colonel Bagley, to train the newly created Imperial Japanese Army. A Japanese businessman, Matsue Omura, intends to use the army to suppress a samurai rebellion against Japan's new emperor. Despite his hatred of Bagley, Algren accepts and his old friend, Sergeant Zebulon Gant, accompanies him.

In Japan, Algren meets Simon Graham, a British translator knowledgeable about the samurai. Algren finds the Imperial conscripts lacking in discipline and difficult to train. Omura and Bagley learn of a rebel assault on one of Omura's railroads and Algren is forced to lead a counterattack of half-trained, inexperiencd recruits. The terrified conscripts flee and are easily routed by the samurai. Gant is killed in the battle and the wounded Algren is taken prisoner. Samurai leader Moritsugu Katsumoto spares his life and Imperial General Hasegawa, a former samurai who once served with Katsumoto, is allowed to commit seppuku.

Katsumoto takes Algren to his village and requests Taka, his sister, care for the wounded American. Algren realizes she is the widow of Hirotaro, a samurai he killed in the battle. With Taka's help, Algren overcomes his alcoholism and guilt, learns the Japanese culture, earns the respect of the samurai and is trained in the art of kenjutsu. He sympathizes with the samurai, upset that modernization has eroded their political power. Algren and Taka develop an unspoken affection for each other.

Algren saves Katsumoto's life when ninjas infiltrate the village and attempt to assassinate him. Concluding that Omura is responsible, Katsumoto travels to Tokyo with Algren to meet with Emperor Meiji. Algren finds the Imperial Army is now fully trained and equipped and Katsumoto is dismayed to learn the young emperor is a puppet of Omura. Omura orders Katsumoto's arrest for carrying a sword in public and offers him either seppuku or the humiliation of a trial. Algren resigns his post in the Army in disgust. After defeating Imperial agents sent by Omura to assassinate him, Algren, Graham and Katsumoto's men free their leader, but Katsumoto's son Nobutada is killed. Katsumoto, grief-stricken, contemplates seppuku, but Algren convinces him to fight the Army massing against the rebels, and pledges to join the samurai in battle. Taka dresses Algren in her late husband's samurai armor, and Katsumoto presents him with a newly forged samurai sword whose inscription proclaims Algren "the warrior in which the old ways have joined the new."

Algren and Katsumoto parley with Omura and Bagley but Katsumoto refuses to surrender. The samurai use the Imperial Army's overconfidence to lure them into a battle that inflicts heavy casualties on both sides. With their numbers dwindling and Imperial reinforcements closing in, Katsumoto orders a suicidal cavalry charge on horseback. Bagley is slain by Algren, but the samurai are quickly mowed down by Gatling guns. Deeply touched by the slaughter and recognizing Algren, who trained him, the Imperial captain tearfully orders a ceasefire. Katsumoto decides to commit seppuku with Algren's help, but he witnesses a cherry blossom tree in his final moments and declares it "perfect." With his death, the imperial soldiers kneel in respect.

The injured Algren interrupts the ongoing trade negotiations to present the emperor with Katsumoto's sword and ask him to remember the traditions for which the samurai fought and died. Despite understanding the importance of modernization, the emperor believes that Japan's traditions and history cannot be forgotten. He rejects the trade offer, and silences Omura's protests by threatening to seize his assets. When the emperor asks how Katsumoto died, Algren offers to let him know how he lived.

Meanwhile, Graham expresses ambiguity over whether Algren survived, but believes he returned to the village to live with Taka and find a measure of peace.

== Cast ==
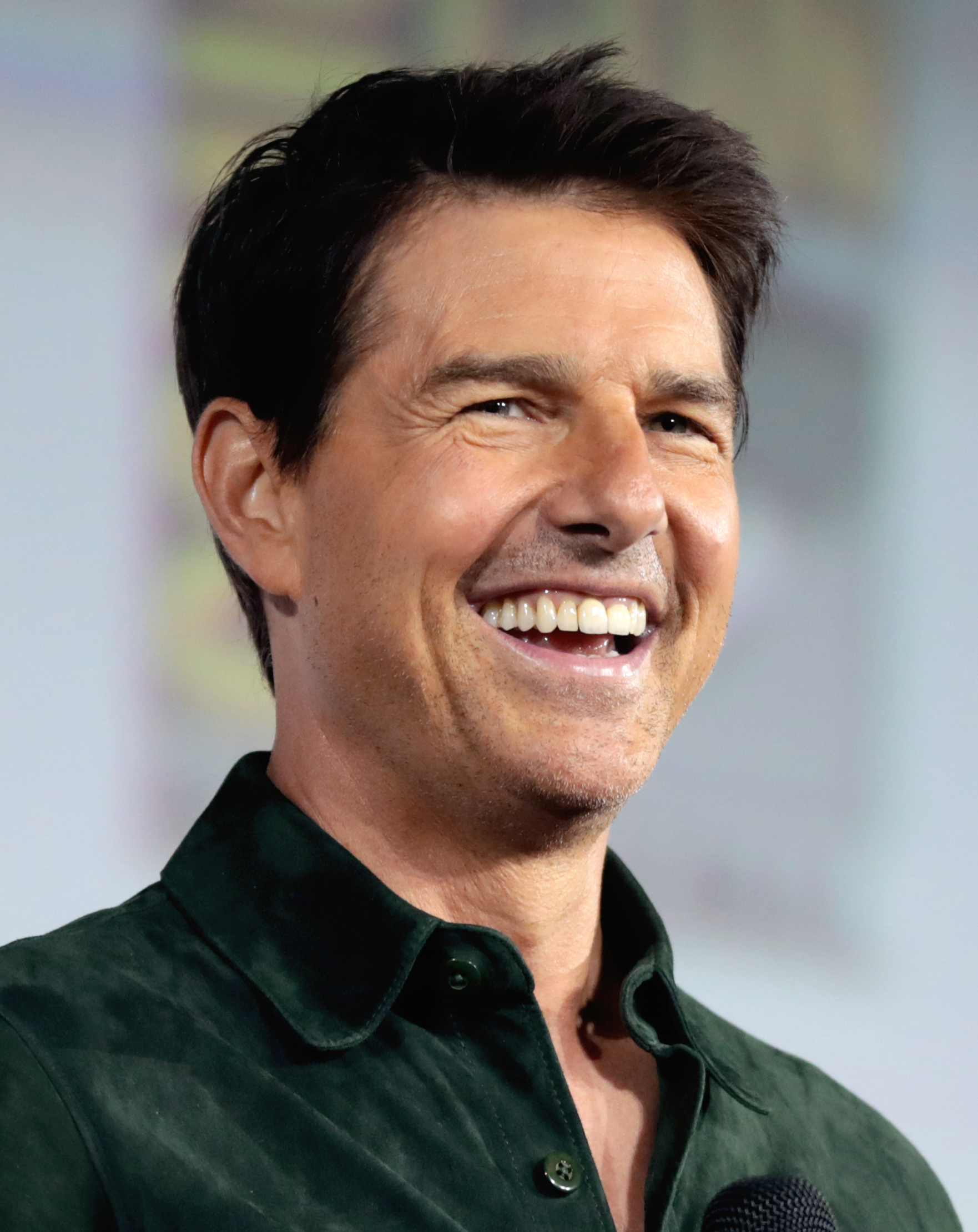
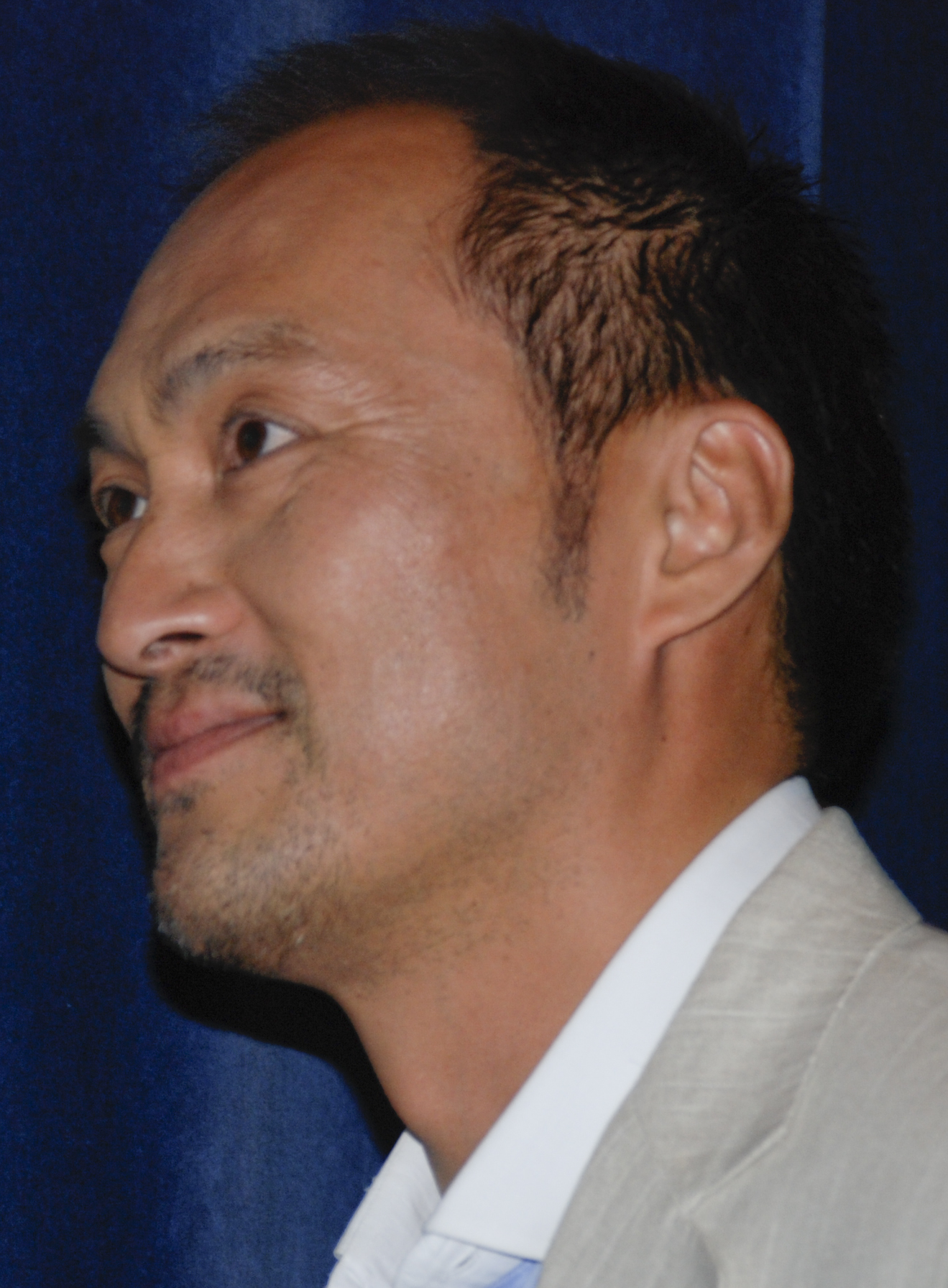
Tom Cruise (left) and Ken Watanabe play Capt. Nathan Algren and Lord Moritsugu Katsumoto respectively. Watanabe garnered critical acclaim for his performance as Katsumoto, earning a nomination for the Academy Award for Best Supporting Actor.
- Tom Cruise as Captain Nathan Algren, a Civil War and Indian War veteran. Although he is an exceptionally talented soldier, he is haunted by his role in the massacre of Native Americans at the Sand Creek or Chivington and/or the massacre of Native Americans at the Washita River. Following his discharge from the United States Army, he agrees to help the new Meiji Restoration government train its first Western-style conscript army for a significant sum of money. During the army's first battle he is captured by the samurai Katsumoto and taken to the village of Katsumoto's son, where he soon becomes intrigued with the way of the samurai and decides to join them in their cause. His journal entries reveal his impressions about traditional Japanese culture, which almost immediately evolve into unrestrained admiration of Japan.
- Ken Watanabe as the Lord Katsumoto Moritsugu, the eponymous "Last Samurai," a former daimyo who was once Emperor Meiji's most trusted teacher. His displeasure with the influence of Omura and other Western reformers on the Emperor lead him to organize his fellow samurai in a revolt, which he hopes will convince the government not to destroy the samurai's place and power in Japanese society. Katsumoto is based on real-life samurai Saigō Takamori, who led the Satsuma Rebellion. Takamori, however, supported modernizing Japan in general and used firearms, unlike the far more reactionary Katsumoto.
- Koyuki as Katsumoto Taka, widow of a samurai slain by Nathan Algren and younger sister of Katsumoto. She is tasked by Katsumoto to care for Algren while he convalesces in their village; over time, she and Algren develop feelings for each other, and she gives him her husband's armor to wear in the final battle of the rebellion.
- Timothy Spall as Simon Graham, a British photographer and scholar hired as an interpreter for Captain Algren and his non-English speaking soldiers. Initially portrayed as a friendly yet mission-oriented and practical-minded companion, he later comes to sympathize with the samurai cause and helps Algren rescue Katsumoto from Imperial soldiers. Graham is loosely based on real-life British Japanologist Ernest Mason Satow, who befriended Saigō Takamori during the Satsuma rebellion.
- Shin Koyamada as Katsumoto Nobutada, Katsumoto's only son and lord of the village where Algren is sent. Nobutada befriends Algren when Katsumoto assigns him to teach Algren Japanese culture and the Japanese language. He dies when he willingly chooses to distract Imperial troops so his father can escape their custody.
- Tony Goldwyn as Colonel Bagley, Nathan Algren's former commanding officer in the 7th Cavalry Regiment. Ruthless and amoral, Bagley convinces Algren to serve as a training instructor for the Imperial Army despite Algren's hatred of Bagley for his role in the Washita River massacre. In contrast to Algren, Bagley is arrogant and dismissive of the samurai, at one point referring to them as nothing more than "savages with bows and arrows". He is killed by Algren who throws a sword into his chest when Bagley tries to shoot Katsumoto in the final battle.
- Masato Harada as Omura, an industrialist and pro-reform politician happy to let imperalists eradicate his culture for profits. He quickly imports Westernization and modernization while making money for himself through his ownership of Japan's railroads. Coming from a merchant family, a social class repressed during the days of Shogun rule, Omura openly expresses his contempt for the samurai and takes advantage of Emperor Meiji's youth to become his chief advisor, persuading him to form a Western-style army for the sole purpose of wiping out Katsumoto and his rebels while ignoring their grievances. His appearance is designed to evoke the image of Ōkubo Toshimichi, a leading reformer during the Meiji Restoration. Omura is shown to be an intelligent businessman and favors social mobility and greater political equality in Japan. He, however, is shown to be relatively naive on military matters.
- Shichinosuke Nakamura as Emperor Meiji. Credited with the implementation of the Meiji reforms to Japanese society, the young Emperor is eager to import Western ideas and practices to modernize and empower Japan to become a strong nation. However, his inexperience causes him to rely heavily on the advice of men like Omura, who have their own agendas. His appearance bears a strong resemblance to Emperor Meiji during the 1860s (when his authority as emperor was not yet firmly established) rather than during the 1870s, when the film is set.
- Hiroyuki Sanada as Ujio, a master swordsman and one of Katsumoto's most trusted followers. Initially showing the most disdain towards Algren during the latter's time in captivity, he teaches Algren the art of sword fighting, coming to respect him as an equal. He is one of the last samurai to die in the final battle, being gunned down during Katsumoto's charge.
- Seizo Fukumoto as Silent Samurai, an elderly samurai tasked with monitoring Algren during his time in the village, who calls the samurai "Bob". "Bob" ultimately saves Algren's life (and speaking for the first and only time, "Algren-san!") by taking a bullet meant for him in the final battle.
- Billy Connolly as Sergeant Zebulon Gant, an Irish American Civil War veteran who served with and is loyal to Algren, persuading him to come to Japan and working with him to train the Imperial Army. During the first battle, he is killed by Hirotaro (Taka's husband) after being wounded with a spear.
- Shun Sugata as Nakao, a tall samurai who wields a naginata and is skilled in jujutsu. He assists Algren in rescuing Katsumoto and dies along with the other samurai in the final battle.
- Togo Igawa as General Hasegawa, a former Samurai serving in the Imperial Japanese Army. He commits seppuku after the first battle.
- William Atherton as Mr. McCabe, a Winchester Rep.
- Scott Wilson as Ambassador Swanbeck
- Chad Lindberg as Winchester Rep Assistant

== Production ==
The producer's involvement in the film was originally developed in 1992 when Interscope Communications, a predecessor to Radar Pictures, developed the film, which was originally written by Michael Alan Eddy. Eddy sued the film's producers in 2004 claiming the WGA and Warner Bros. refused to give him credit.

Filming took place in New Zealand, mostly in the Taranaki region, with mostly Japanese cast members and an American production crew. This location was chosen due to the fact that Egmont/Mount Taranaki resembles Mount Fuji, and also because there is a lot of forest and farmland in the Taranaki region. American Location Manager Charlie Harrington saw the mountain in a travel book and encouraged the producers to send him to Taranaki to scout the locations. This acted as a backdrop for many scenes, as opposed to the built up cities of Japan. Several of the village scenes were shot on the Warner Bros. Studios backlot in Burbank, California. Some scenes were shot in Kyoto and Himeji, Japan. There were 13 filming locations altogether. Tom Cruise did his own stunts for the film.

The film itself was inspired by writer and director Vincent Ward. Ward became executive producer on the film – working in development on it for nearly four years and after approaching several directors, including Francis Ford Coppola and Peter Weir, until he became interested with Edward Zwick. The film production went ahead with Zwick and was shot in Ward's native New Zealand.

Cinematographer John Toll invited Gary Capo on the project to serve as second unit director and cinematographer. Capo specifically supervised a lot of the filming of the climactic battle sequence between the Japanese army and the samurai.

The film was based on the stories of Eugène Collache and Jules Brunet, both French Imperial Guard officers, who fought alongside Enomoto Takeaki in the earlier Boshin War; and Philip Kearny, a United States Army (Union Army) and French Imperial Guard soldier, notable for his leadership in the American Civil War, who fought against the Tututni tribe in the Rogue River Wars in Oregon.

== Music ==
The Last Samurai: Original Motion Picture Score

Film score by Hans Zimmer
- Released: November 25, 2003
- Genre: Soundtrack
- Length: 59:41
- Label: Warner Sunset
- Producer: Hans Zimmer

Hans Zimmer chronology
Matchstick Men (2003)	The Last Samurai: Original Motion Picture Score (2003)	King Arthur (2003)

The Last Samurai: Original Motion Picture Score was released on November 25, 2003, by Warner Sunset Records. All music on the soundtrack was composed, arranged, and produced by Hans Zimmer, performed by the Hollywood Studio Symphony, and conducted by Blake Neely. It peaked at number 24 on the US Top Soundtracks chart.

== Release ==
The Last Samurai had its world premiere in Tokyo on November 20, 2003. The film was released worldwide to theaters on December 5, 2003, by Warner Bros. Pictures.

== Reception ==
=== Critical response ===
Critical reception in Japan was generally positive. Tomomi Katsuta of The Mainichi Shinbun thought that the film was "a vast improvement over previous American attempts to portray Japan", noting that director Edward Zwick "had researched Japanese history, cast well-known Japanese actors and consulted dialogue coaches to make sure he didn't confuse the casual and formal categories of Japanese speech." Katsuta still found fault with the film's idealistic, "storybook" portrayal of the samurai, stating: "Our image of samurai is that they were more corrupt." As such, he said, the noble samurai leader Katsumoto "set my teeth on edge."

In the United States, review aggregator Rotten Tomatoes reports that 65% of critics have given the film a positive review based on 216 reviews, with an average score of 6.4/10. The site's consensus states: "With high production values and thrilling battle scenes, The Last Samurai is a satisfying epic." At Metacritic, which assigns a weighted mean rating out of 100 to reviews from mainstream critics, the film received an average score of 55, based on reviews from 43 critics, indicating "mixed or average reviews". Audiences polled by CinemaScore gave the film an average grade of "A" on an A+ to F scale.

Roger Ebert of Chicago Sun-Times gave the film three and a half stars out of four, saying "beautifully designed, intelligently written, acted with conviction, it's an uncommonly thoughtful epic."

=== Box office ===
The film achieved higher box office receipts in Japan than in the United States. Upon its debut, it collected a total opening weekend gross of $8 million. Overall, it ranked number two at the box office behind Finding Nemo. It became the highest-grossing R-rated film there, surpassing The Matrix Reloaded. The film grossed $456.8 million against a production budget of $140 million. It grossed $111,127,263 in the United States and Canada, and $345,631,718 in other countries. It was one of the most successful box office hits in Japan, where it grossed ¥13.7 billion ($132 million).

=== Accolades ===
Award	Date of ceremony	Category	Recipient(s)	Result	Ref.
Academy Awards	February 29, 2004	Best Supporting Actor	Ken Watanabe	Nominated	
Academy Awards	February 29, 2004	Best Production Design	Lilly Kilvert and Gretchen Rau	Nominated	
Academy Awards	February 29, 2004	Best Costume Design	Ngila Dickson	Nominated	
Academy Awards	February 29, 2004	Best Sound	Andy Nelson, Anna Behlmer and Jeff Wexler	Nominated	
ADG Excellence in Production Design Awards	February 14, 2004	Excellence in Production Design for a Period Film	Lilly Kilvert, Christopher Burian-Mohr, Jess Gonchor, Kim Sinclair, Tristan Paris Bourne, Martha Johnston, Elizabeth Flaherty, Harry E. Otto and John Berger	Nominated	
African-American Film Critics Association Awards	December 22, 2003	Top 10	The Last Samurai	5th place	
All Def Movie Awards	February 27, 2017	Most Out of Place White Person in a Movie	Tom Cruise	Won	
American Film Institute Awards	December 15, 2003	AFI Movies of the Year	The Last Samurai	Won	
American Society of Cinematographers Awards	February 8, 2004	Outstanding Achievement in Cinematography in Theatrical Releases	John Toll	Nominated	
ASCAP Film and Television Music Awards	April 21, 2004	Top Box Office Films	Hans Zimmer	Won (Note: Tied with 12 other people)	
Blue Ribbon Awards	February 2004	Special Award	Ken Watanabe	Won	
Cinema Audio Society Awards	February 21, 2004	Outstanding Achievement in Sound Mixing for Motion Pictures	Andy Nelson, Anna Behlmer and Jeff Wexler	Nominated	
Costume Designers Guild Award	February 22, 2004	Excellence in Period/Fantasy Film	Ngila Dickson	Nominated	
Critics' Choice Movie Awards	January 10, 2004	Best Picture	The Last Samurai	Nominated	
Critics' Choice Movie Awards	January 10, 2004	Best Supporting Actor	Ken Watanabe	Nominated	
Critics' Choice Movie Awards	January 10, 2004	Best Score	Hans Zimmer	Nominated	
Dallas–Fort Worth Film Critics Association Awards	January 6, 2004	Top 10 Films	The Last Samurai	Won	
Dallas–Fort Worth Film Critics Association Awards	January 6, 2004	Best Supporting Actor	Ken Watanabe	Nominated	
EMMA Awards	May 24, 2004	Best Film Actor	Tom Cruise	Won	
Golden Globe Awards	January 25, 2004	Best Actor in a Motion Picture – Drama	Tom Cruise	Nominated	
Golden Globe Awards	January 25, 2004	Best Supporting Actor – Motion Picture	Ken Watanabe	Nominated	
Golden Globe Awards	January 25, 2004	Best Original Score	Hans Zimmer	Nominated	
Golden Reel Awards	February 28, 2004	Outstanding Achievement in Sound Editing – Dialogue and ADR for Feature Film	Mark Stoeckinger, Kerry Dean Williams, Laura Harris Atkinson, Anna MacKenzie, Kelly Oxford, Michelle Pazer and David A. Cohen	Nominated	
Golden Reel Awards	February 28, 2004	Outstanding Achievement in Sound Editing – Sound Effects and Foley for Feature Film	Mark Stoeckinger, Michael Kamper, Jon Title, Craig S. Jaeger, Christopher Assells, Dino Dimuro, Alan Rankin, Bruce Tanis, Ben Wilkins, Bob Beher and Frank Smathers	Nominated	
Japan Academy Film Prize	February 18, 2005	Outstanding Foreign Language Film	The Last Samurai	Won	
Make-Up Artists & Hair Stylists Guild Award	January 17, 2004	Best Period Hair Styling - Feature	Janice Alexander, Terry Baliel, Karen Asano-Myers, Carol Pershing and Kimberley Spiteri	Won	
Make-Up Artists & Hair Stylists Guild Award	January 17, 2004	Best Period Makeup - Feature	Lois Burwell, Margaret E. Elliott and Tina Harrelson	Nominated	
MTV Movie & TV Awards	June 5, 2004	Best Actor in a Movie	Tom Cruise	Nominated	
MTV Movie Awards Mexico	June 22, 2004	Most Funniest "Gringo" in Japan	Tom Cruise	Won	
National Board of Review Award	December 3, 2003	Top Ten Films	The Last Samurai	Won	
National Board of Review Award	December 3, 2003	Best Director	Edward Zwick	Won	
Nikkan Sports Film Awards	December 29, 2004	Best Foreign Film	The Last Samurai	Won	
Online Film Critics Society Awards	January 5, 2004	Best Cinematography	John Toll	Nominated	
Online Film Critics Society Awards	January 5, 2004	Best Original Score	Hans Zimmer	Nominated	
Producers Guild of America Awards	January 17, 2004	Best Theatrical Motion Picture	The Last Samurai	Nominated	
Satellite Awards	February 21, 2004	Best Motion Picture, Drama	The Last Samurai	Nominated	
Satellite Awards	February 21, 2004	Best Actor in a Motion Picture, Drama	Tom Cruise	Nominated	
Satellite Awards	February 21, 2004	Best Actor in a Supporting Role, Drama	Ken Watanabe	Nominated	
Satellite Awards	February 21, 2004	Best Original Score	Hans Zimmer	Won	
Satellite Awards	February 21, 2004	Best Cinematography	John Toll	Won	
Satellite Awards	February 21, 2004	Best Art Direction and Production Design	Lilly Kilvert and Gretchen Rau	Nominated	
Satellite Awards	February 21, 2004	Best Costume Design	Ngila Dickson	Won	
Satellite Awards	February 21, 2004	Best Editing	Victor Du Bois and Steven Rosenblum	Won	
Satellite Awards	February 21, 2004	Best Sound	Andy Nelson, Anna Behlmer and Jeff Wexler	Nominated	
Satellite Awards	February 21, 2004	Best Visual Effects	The Last Samurai	Nominated	
Saturn Awards	May 5, 2004	Best Action or Adventure Film	The Last Samurai	Nominated	
Saturn Awards	May 5, 2004	Best Director	Edward Zwick	Nominated	
Saturn Awards	May 5, 2004	Best Actor	Tom Cruise	Nominated	
Saturn Awards	May 5, 2004	Best Supporting Actor	Ken Watanabe	Nominated	
Saturn Awards	May 5, 2004	Best Performance by a Younger Actor	Sosuke Ikematsu	Nominated	
Screen Actors Guild Awards	February 22, 2004	Outstanding Performance by a Male Actor in a Supporting Role	Ken Watanabe	Nominated	
Stinkers Bad Movie Awards	February 22, 2004	Most Overrated Movie	The Last Samurai	Won	
Taurus World Stunt Awards	May 16, 2004	Best Fire	The Last Samurai	Won	
Visual Effects Society Awards	February 18, 2004	Outstanding Supporting Visual Effects in a Feature Motion Picture	Jeffrey A. Okun, Thomas Boland, Bill Mesa and Ray McIntyre Jr.	Won	

== Criticism and debate ==
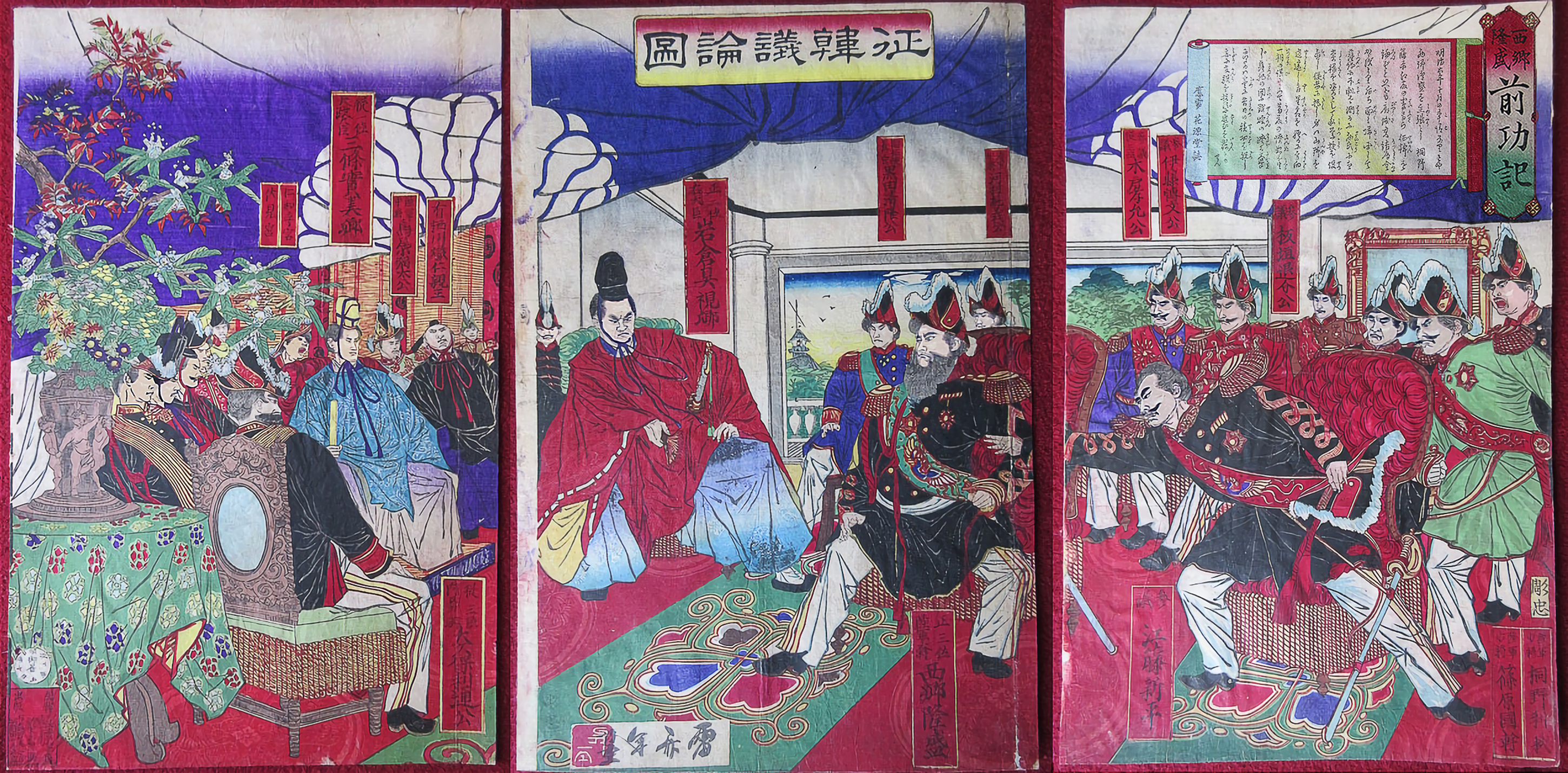
The Seikanron debate of 1873. Saigō Takamori insisted that Japan should go to war with Korea.

Motoko Rich of The New York Times observed that the film has opened up a debate, "particularly among Asian-Americans and Japanese," about whether the film and others like it were "racist, naïve, well-intentioned, accurate – or all of the above."

Todd McCarthy, a film critic for the Variety magazine, wrote: "Clearly enamored of the culture it examines while resolutely remaining an outsider's romanticization of it, yarn is disappointingly content to recycle familiar attitudes about the nobility of ancient cultures, Western despoilment of them, liberal historical guilt, the unrestrainable greed of capitalists and the irreducible primacy of Hollywood movie stars."

According to the history professor Cathy Schultz, "Many samurai fought Meiji modernization not for altruistic reasons but because it challenged their status as the privileged warrior caste. Meiji reformers proposed the radical idea that all men essentially being equal.... The film also misses the historical reality that many Meiji policy advisors were former samurai, who had voluntarily given up their traditional privileges to follow a course they believed would strengthen Japan."

The fictional character of Katsumoto bears a striking resemblance to the historical figure of Saigō Takamori, a hero of the Meiji Restoration and the leader of the ineffective Satsuma Rebellion, who appears in the histories and legends of modern Japan as a hero against the corruption, extravagance, and unprincipled politics of his contemporaries. "Though he had agreed to become a member of the new government," wrote the translator and historian Ivan Morris, "it was clear from his writings and statements that he believed the ideals of the civil war were being vitiated. He was opposed to the excessively rapid changes in Japanese society and was particularly disturbed by the shabby treatment of the warrior class." Suspicious of the new bureaucracy, he wanted power to remain in the hands of the samurai class and the Emperor, and for those reasons, he had joined the central government. "Edicts like the interdiction against carrying swords and wearing the traditional topknot seemed like a series of gratuitous provocations; and, though Saigō realized that Japan needed an effective standing army to resist pressure from the West, he could not countenance the social implications of the military reforms. For this reason Saigō, although participating in the Okinoerabu government, continued to exercise a powerful appeal among disgruntled ex-samurai in Satsuma and elsewhere." Saigō fought for a moral revolution, not a material one, and he described his revolt as a check on the declining morality of a new, Westernizing materialism.

In 2014, the movie was one of several discussed by Keli Goff in The Daily Beast in an article on white savior narratives in film, a cinematic trope studied in sociology, for which The Last Samurai has been analyzed. David Sirota at Salon saw the film as "yet another film presenting the white Union army official as personally embodying the North's Civil War effort to liberate people of color" and criticizing the release poster as "a not-so-subtle message encouraging audiences to (wrongly) perceive the white guy -- and not a Japanese person -- as the last great leader of the ancient Japanese culture."

In a 2022 interview with The Guardian, Ken Watanabe stated that he didn't think of The Last Samurai as a white savior narrative and that it was a turning point for Asian representation in Hollywood. Watanabe also stated, “Before The Last Samurai, there was this stereotype of Asian people with glasses, bucked teeth and a camera, [...] It was stupid, but after The Last Samurai came out, Hollywood tried to be more authentic when it came to Asian stories.”

== See also ==
- Foreign government advisors in Meiji Japan
- Ōmura Masujirō
- French Military Mission to Japan (1867)
- Mark Rappaport (creature effects artist)
