= Barry Munday =

- Directed by: Chris D'Arienzo
- Screenplay by: Chris D'Arienzo
- Based on: Life is a Strange Place by Frank Turner Hollon
- Produced by: Mickey Barold; Stone Douglass; Eric Kopeloff; Matt Weaver
- Starring: Patrick Wilson; Judy Greer; Chloë Sevigny; Jean Smart; Cybill Shepherd; Shea Whigham; Missi Pyle; Christopher McDonald; Billy Dee Williams; Malcolm McDowell
- Cinematography: Morgan Susser
- Edited by: Joan Sobel
- Music by: Jude Christodal (as Jude)
- Production companies: Stick 'N' Stone Productions; Corner Stone Entertainment; Far Hills Pictures; Prospect Pictures
- Distributed by: Magnolia Pictures
- Release dates: March 13, 2010 (SXSW); October 1, 2010
- Running time: 95 minutes
- Country: United States
- Language: English

Barry Munday (alternatively known as Family Jewels) is a 2010 American comedy film directed by Chris D'Arienzo; it is based on the novel Life is a Strange Place by Frank Turner Hollon. It is D'Arienzo's directorial debut. The film stars Patrick Wilson as the title character, as well as Judy Greer, Chloë Sevigny, Jean Smart, Shea Whigham, Missi Pyle, Christopher McDonald, Billy Dee Williams and Malcolm McDowell. The story revolves around a womanizer who wakes up to find that his testicles have disappeared and he is facing a paternity lawsuit by a woman he can't remember having sex with. The film premiered at the South by Southwest Film Festival on March 13, 2010, got picked up by Magnolia Pictures and was given a limited release on October 1. Barry Munday garnered negative reviews from critics who praised Wilson's performance but criticized D'Arienzo's quirky filmmaking leading the vulgar material.

== Plot ==
Barry Munday, a lonely womanizer, wakes up after being attacked to realize that he's missing his "family jewels". To make matters worse, he learns he's facing a paternity lawsuit filed by a woman, Ginger, he can't remember having sex with. Though unintentional, the two discover that their meeting and subsequent "accidents" opened up new opportunities for personal growth and relationships.

== Cast ==
- Patrick Wilson as Barry Munday
- Judy Greer as Ginger Farley
- Chloë Sevigny as Jennifer Farley
- Jean Smart as Carol Munday
- Cybill Shepherd as Mrs. Farley
- Malcolm McDowell as Mr. Farley
- Shea Whigham as Donald
- Missi Pyle as Lida Griggs
- Billy Dee Williams as Lonnie Green
- Christopher McDonald as Dr. Preston Edwards
- Colin Hanks as Heavy Metal Greg
- Mae Whitman as Candice
- Kyle Gass as Jerry Sherman from Barry's support group
- Barret Swatek as Lucy
- Trieu Tran as Moe
- Razaaq Adoti as Spiro
- Emily Procter as Deborah
- Matt Winston as Kyle Pennington
- Sam Pancake as D.J.
- Bruna Rubio as Sasha

== Release ==
On February 4, 2010, Barry Munday was selected as one of the Spotlight Premieres for the 2010 South by Southwest Film Festival, and made its world premiere on March 13. Magnolia Pictures bought the film's distribution rights after its premiere at SXSW, first releasing it on August 27 as part of its Ultra VOD program, and giving it a limited release on October 1.

== Reception ==
Barry Munday received negative reviews from critics. On the review aggregator website Rotten Tomatoes, 47% of 15 critics' reviews are positive, with an average rating of 5.3/10. Metacritic, which uses a weighted average, assigned the film a score of 28 out of 100, based on 6 critics, indicating "generally unfavorable" reviews.

Eric Kohn of IndieWire praised Wilson's "gentle, unassuming performance" for making the title character "work[s] well enough to generate a steady volume of pathos" but felt the film suffered from "an ever-present lightness despite its vulgar nature," criticizing D'Arienzo's screenplay for containing a "constant barrage of personal gripes and directionless vulgarity that lacks enough ingenuity" to elevate the film's light-hearted tone that "occasionally manages to create a gently bittersweet vibe due to this decisive blend." He concluded that the film's positive elements "simply fail to compensate for the greater lack of competence needed to excuse the shoddy, half-baked plot. The movie's forgettable qualities set it up for a put-down on its own lame terms: "Barry" is mundane." A writer for The Hollywood Reporter called it a "frumpy version of "Knocked Up" playing out in a sadder, stranger world," praising Wilson for giving "another successful against-type performance," but felt the "garish and unfashionable" production choices alleviate the seriousness of the story's overall tone, saying "the film's focus on some pretty unappealing quirks limits its commercial appeal." Variety film critic Joe Leydon gave praise to both Wilson and Greer for being "almost too convincing" and giving "some welcome emotional truth" to their respective roles but was critical of D'Arienzo for overusing his supporting cast and laying the "self-conscious quirkiness" thick in his "uneven but modestly diverting indie" film.

Robert Abele of the Los Angeles Times commended Wilson for portraying the title character with "admirable comic understatement" and the film for having "acceptable heart tugs towards the end", but concluded that: "D'Arienzo's love of trite indie-movie signposts of comic quirkiness — deadpan delivery, overly formal camerawork, characters delivering dialogue into the camera, stunt casting (Billy Dee Williams as Wilson's boss) — is ultimately regrettable." Scott Tobias of NPR also commended Wilson for giving the titular character "a puppy-dog eagerness that's refreshing in its total lack of vanity" but felt the film was a "deeply off-putting independent comedy," criticizing D'Arienzo's direction of Greer's character into being "irredeemably, almost inhumanly nasty" and the "egregious stunt casting" of his supporting actors, saying "Barry Munday clashes as violently as its retro-patterned sweaters and hideously ornate wallpaper." Nathan Rabin of The A.V. Club gave it a "D+" grade, criticizing D'Arienzo for ignoring the movie's overall message and replaced it with "random wackiness, distracting stunt casting, and Napoleon Dynamite-style production design." He concluded that "this sluggishly paced quirkfest is awfully sophomoric for a film all about giving up the facile thrills of youth for the responsibilities of adulthood."
