= I Am Sam =

2001 American drama film by Jessie Nelson

- Theatrical release poster
- Directed by: Jessie Nelson
- Written by: Kristine Johnson; Jessie Nelson
- Produced by: Jessie Nelson; Richard Solomon; Edward Zwick; Marshall Herskovitz
- Starring: Sean Penn; Michelle Pfeiffer; Dianne Wiest; Dakota Fanning; Richard Schiff; Doug Hutchison; Loretta Devine; Laura Dern
- Cinematography: Elliot Davis
- Edited by: Richard Chew
- Music by: John Powell
- Production company: The Bedford Falls Company
- Distributed by: New Line Cinema
- Release date: December 28, 2001
- Running time: 132 minutes
- Country: United States
- Language: English
- Budget: $22 million
- Box office: $97.8 million

I Am Sam (stylized in all lowercase) is a 2001 American drama film co-written and directed by Jessie Nelson. It stars Sean Penn, Michelle Pfeiffer, Dianne Wiest, Dakota Fanning, Richard Schiff, Loretta Devine, and Laura Dern.

Nelson and co-writer Kristine Johnson researched the problems facing adults with intellectual disabilities by visiting the non-profit organization L.A. GOAL (Greater Opportunities for the Advanced Living). They subsequently cast two actors with disabilities, Brad Silverman and Joe Rosenberg, in key roles. The film's title is derived from the lines "I am Sam / Sam I am" of the book Green Eggs and Ham by Dr. Seuss, which is included in the movie.

I Am Sam had a limited release by New Line Cinema on December 28, 2001 before expanding to a wide release on January 18, 2002. The film received mixed reviews from critics and grossed over $97 million at the box office. For his role as Sam, Penn was nominated for the Academy Award for Best Actor at the 74th Academy Awards in 2002. The film launched the career of Dakota Fanning and her younger sister Elle Fanning, who were then seven and almost three years old respectively. Dakota Fanning became the youngest person to be nominated for a Screen Actors Guild Award.

== Plot ==
In 1993, Sam Dawson, a Starbucks barista with an intellectual disability, becomes the single father of Lucy Diamond Dawson, named after the Beatles song "Lucy in the Sky with Diamonds", following her abandonment by her mother, a homeless woman with whom Sam had sex, who had no interest in having her. Sam is well-adjusted and has a supportive group of friends with disabilities as well as a kind, agoraphobic neighbor, Annie, who takes care of Lucy when Sam cannot.

Seven years later, in 2001, Sam provides a loving place for precocious Lucy, though she soon surpasses his mental capacity and ability. Other children bully her for having an intellectually disabled father, and she becomes too embarrassed to accept that she is more intelligent than he is.

In danger of losing child custody, Sam gets advice from his friends and also hires the lawyer Rita Harrison, whose absorption in her work, and neglect of her son Willie, reveals she also struggles with her role as a parent. In an attempt to prove that she is not cold, Rita agrees to take on Sam's case pro bono. As they work to secure Sam's rights, Sam helps Rita see her own life anew. This includes encouraging her to leave her philandering husband and repair her fractious relationship with her son.

At the trial, Rita makes some convincing arguments while questioning a few different witnesses, including Annie. However, the prosecutor puts so much pressure on Sam that he breaks down, after becoming convinced he is not capable of raising Lucy. Afterward, Lucy resides in a foster home with Miranda "Randy" Carpenter but tries to convince Sam to help her run away. Sam moves to be near Lucy, so she continually leaves in the middle of the night to go to his apartment, though he immediately returns her. The foster parents, in the end, decide not to adopt her as they had planned, and return her to Sam. Randy assures him that she will tell the judge he is the best parent for Lucy. In turn, Sam asks Randy if she will help him raise Lucy because he feels she needs a mother figure.

The final scene depicts a soccer game, in which Sam referees and Lucy participates as a player. In attendance are Lucy's former foster family, Sam's friend group, and a newly single Rita with her son.

== Cast ==
- Sean Penn as Samuel John "Sam" Dawson
- Michelle Pfeiffer as Rita Harrison Williams
- Dianne Wiest as Annie Cassell
- Dakota Fanning as 6-year-old Lucy Diamond Dawson
  - Amanda Lehaf as 4-year-old Lucy
  - Elle Fanning as 2-year-old Lucy
  - Felicity Ann and Makindra Sherry Forbes as 18-month-old Lucy
  - Ryan Williams as 6-month-old Lucy
  - Allison and Jillian Thormahlen as newborn Lucy
- Richard Schiff as Mr. Turner
- Loretta Devine as Margaret Calgrove
- Doug Hutchison as Ifty
- Laura Dern as Miranda "Randy" Carpenter
- Stanley DeSantis as Robert
- Molly Gordon as Callie
- Rosalind Chao as Lily
- Marin Hinkle as Patricia
- Brad Allan Silverman as Brad
- Joseph Rosenberg as Joe
- Ken Jenkins as Judge Philip McNeily
- Wendy Phillips as Miss Wright
- Scott Paulin as Duncan Rhodes
- Kimberly Scott as Gertie
- Michael B. Silver as Dr. Jaslow
- Eileen Ryan as Estelle
- Mary Steenburgen as Dr. Blake
- Will Wallace as Bill Carpenter
- Jen Taylor as Woman Chauffeur
- Brent Spiner as Shoe Salesman
- Kathleen Robertson as Big Boy Waitress

== Soundtrack ==
The Grammy Award–nominated soundtrack, consists of original music by John Powell and cover versions of songs by the Beatles. The album contents are made up entirely of cover versions of songs by the Beatles, although it was originally intended to consist of the group's original recordings. When producers were unable to obtain the rights to the original tracks, they commissioned artists such as the Black Crowes, Nick Cave, Stereophonics, Eddie Vedder, Sheryl Crow, Sarah McLachlan, Rufus Wainwright, the Wallflowers, Ben Harper, the Vines, and Ben Folds to record the versions released. Penn's brother, Michael Penn, is also featured on a duet with his wife Aimee Mann.

== Reception ==
=== Critical response ===
On review aggregator Rotten Tomatoes, the film has an approval rating of 35% based on reviews from 144 critics. The site's consensus reads: "Not only does the manipulative I Am Sam oversimplify a complex issue, it drowns it in treacle." On Metacritic, the film has a score of 28 of 100 based on 33 reviews, indicating "generally unfavorable" reviews. Audiences surveyed by CinemaScore gave the film a grade "A" on a scale of A to F.

A. O. Scott of The New York Times wrote that "I Am Sam is not a bad movie, and its intentions are unimpeachable. But its sentimentality is so relentless and its narrative so predictable that the life is very nearly squeezed out of it." Variety wrote: "Undone by its best intentions, I Am Sam is an especially insipid example of the Hollywood message movie". Roger Ebert wrote that "The lesson 'I Am Sam' wants to teach us is, 'All you need is love.' This is not quite strictly true. Sam loves his daughter more than anyone else, and she loves him, but it will take more than love for him to see her through grade school and adolescence and out into the world. Since the movie does not believe this, it has a serious disagreement with most of the audience." Ebert also criticized the morality tale character of the movie, saying that "You can't have heroes and villains when the wrong side is making the best sense."

Kevin Thomas of the Los Angeles Times reviewed it positively as a "most inviting and accessible film that turns upon a mental condition that most people would prefer not to think about." Mick LaSalle of the San Francisco Chronicle commended Sean Penn for his performance: "Penn's accuracy, his lack of condescension or sentiment, and his willingness to inhabit his character without any implicit commentary take what might have been the equivalent of an inflated TV movie and elevate it to the level of art." David Denby of The New Yorker found Michelle Pfeiffer to be the standout: "Pfeiffer, enormously likable in the role, almost saves the movie."

=== Accolades ===
Sean Penn was nominated for the Academy Award for Best Actor, the Screen Actors Guild Award for Outstanding Performance by a Male Actor in a Leading Role, the Broadcast Film Critics Association Award for Best Actor and the Satellite Award for Best Actor – Motion Picture Drama.

Dakota Fanning won the Broadcast Film Critics Association Award for Best Young Performer, the Las Vegas Film Critics Society Award for Youth in Film, the Phoenix Film Critics Society Award for Best Youth Actress, the Satellite Award for Outstanding New Talent, and the Young Artist Award for Best Performance in a Feature Film – Young Actress Age Ten or Under. She was also nominated for the Screen Actors Guild Award for Outstanding Performance by a Female Actor in a Supporting Role.

The soundtrack was nominated for the Grammy Award for Best Compilation Soundtrack Album for a Motion Picture, Television or Other Visual Media.

The film won the inaugural Stanley Kramer Award from the Producers Guild of America and was nominated for the Humanitas Prize and the Japan Academy Film Prize for Outstanding Foreign Language Film.

Award	Category	Nominee	Result
Academy Awards	Best Actor	Sean Penn	Nominated
Critics' Choice Awards	Best Actor	Sean Penn	Nominated
Critics' Choice Awards	Best Young Performer	Dakota Fanning	Won
Grammy Awards	Best Compilation Soundtrack Album for a Motion Picture, Television or Other Visual Media		Nominated
Humanitas Prize		Kristine Johnson; Jessie Nelson	Won
Japan Academy Film Prize	Outstanding Foreign Language Film		Nominated
Las Vegas Film Critics Society	Youth in Film	Dakota Fanning	Won
Producers Guild of America	Stanley Kramer Award	Jessie Nelson; Edward Zwick; Marshall Herskovitz; Richard Solomon	Won
Phoenix Film Critics Society	Phoenix Film Critics Society Award for Best Youth Actress	Dakota Fanning	Won
Satellite Awards	Best Actor	Sean Penn	Nominated
Satellite Awards	Special Achievement Award for Outstanding New Talent	Dakota Fanning	Won
Screen Actors Guild Awards	Outstanding Performance by a Male Actor in a Leading Role	Sean Penn	Nominated
Screen Actors Guild Awards	Outstanding Performance by a Female Actor in a Supporting Role	Dakota Fanning	Nominated
Young Artist Awards	Best Family Feature Film – Drama		Won
Young Artist Awards	Best Performance in a Feature Film – Young Actress Age Ten or Under	Dakota Fanning	Won
