= Christopher Cooke =

American former Air Force lieutenant (born 1956)

Christopher M. Cooke (born 1956) is a former United States Air Force 2nd Lieutenant who provided classified Titan II missile information to the Soviet embassy in 1981.

== Early life ==
Cooke was born in 1956. At a young age, he had witnessed his father's murder at the hands of his maternal grandfather. After leaving home, he then joined the US Air Force. Raised in an irreligious household, Cooke later remarked he found a sense of belonging by accepting Hinduism, then marrying a woman from India.

== Espionage ==
In 1981, while stationed at McConnell Air Force Base, Kansas, Cooke made three visits to the Soviet Embassy to the United States, offering information on the Titan II missile. An Air Force memo described his disclosures of launch codes and other information as "a major security breach ... the worst perhaps in the history of the Air Force." While the Soviets accepted the secrets, they decided against further dealings with Cooke, as they could not determine if he was attempting to "dangle" information for purposes of entrapment or was an immature individual enchanted by James Bond movies. After his 1981 arrest, as part of his debriefing, Cooke said the Russians were perplexed at his suggestion at using the code name "Scorpion" for him, nor did they appreciate the spycraft he recommended using. He was court-martialed and charged with Article 92 of the UCMJ, Failure to Follow a Military Order.

In 1982, Cooke, with the aid of F. Lee Bailey, appealed his case on the basis that Cooke had signed an agreement with the Air Force disclosing everything in exchange for immunity from prosecution, which was ignored earlier. In light of the paper trail, the Court of Military Appeals overturned Cooke's court-martial. Cooke, however, was forced to resign his commission and discharged from the Air Force with an "other-than-honorable" discharge.

== Later life ==
Cooke wrote two books, In Realms Beyond in 1999, and Revenge: Demons Cursed in 2013.
