= Marshall Herskovitz =

American film director

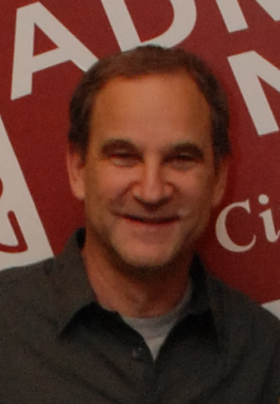
- Herskovitz at George Mason University, 2008
- Born: Marshall Schreiber Herskovitz; February 23, 1952 (age 74); Philadelphia, Pennsylvania
- Education: AFI Conservatory
- Years active: 1976–present
- Spouses: Susan Amanda Shilladay (m. 1981; div. 1993) Landry Major (m. 2015)
- Children: 2

Marshall Schreiber Herskovitz (born February 23, 1952) is an American film director, writer, and producer, and currently the President Emeritus of the Producers Guild of America. Among his productions are Traffic, The Last Samurai, Blood Diamond, and I Am Sam. Herskovitz has directed two feature films, Jack the Bear and Dangerous Beauty. Herskovitz was a creator and executive producer of the television shows thirtysomething, My So-Called Life, and Once and Again, and also wrote and directed several episodes of all three series.

== Life and career ==
Herskovitz was born in Philadelphia, Pennsylvania, the son of Frieda (née Schreiber) and Alexander Herskovitz. His family is Jewish.

He was married to screenwriter Susan Shilliday from 1981 to 1993. They have two daughters.

Herskovitz married Landry Major in 2015.

Herskovitz has long been "one of the film industry's most active and passionate environmentalists." He serves on the advisory board of The Climate Mobilization, a grassroots advocacy group calling for a national economic mobilization against climate change on the scale of the home front during World War II, with the goal of 100% clean energy and net zero greenhouse gas emissions by 2025.

== Awards ==
Thirtysomething won numerous Primetime Emmy Awards, including Outstanding Drama series in 1988. That year it also won Outstanding Writing in a Drama series for an episode that Herskovitz co-wrote with Paul Haggis. The show also received the Best Drama Series award at the Golden Globes that year. Herskovitz himself was honored by both the Writers Guild and Directors Guild for his work on the series.

Traffic was nominated for Best Picture at the 73rd Academy Awards in 2001.

Once and Again was nominated for Best Drama Series of 1999 at the Golden Globes.

== Filmography ==
Year	Title	Director	Producer	Writer	Notes
1993	Jack the Bear	Yes	No	No	
1994	Legends of the Fall	No	Yes	No	
1998	Dangerous Beauty	Yes	Yes	No	
2000	Traffic	No	Yes	No	Nominated- Academy Award for Best Picture
2001	I Am Sam	No	Yes	No	
2003	The Last Samurai	No	Yes	Yes	
2006	Blood Diamond	No	Yes	No	
2010	Love & Other Drugs	No	Yes	Yes	
2016	Jack Reacher: Never Go Back	No	No	Yes	
2016	The Great Wall	No	No	Story	story credits with Max Brooks and Edward Zwick
2016–2018	Nashville	No	Executive	Yes	Seasons 5–6
2017	American Assassin	No	No	Yes	
2017	Woman Walks Ahead	No	Yes	No	

Executive producer

- Lone Star State of Mind (2002)
- Defiance (2008)
- About Alex (2014)
- Boys of Abu Ghraib (2014)

Other credits

Year	Title	Role
1998	Desperate Measures	Actor
1998	Shakespeare in Love	Thanks
2004	Crash	Acknowledgement
2007	In the Valley of Elah	Special thanks
