= A Woman Under the Influence =

1974 film by John Cassavetes

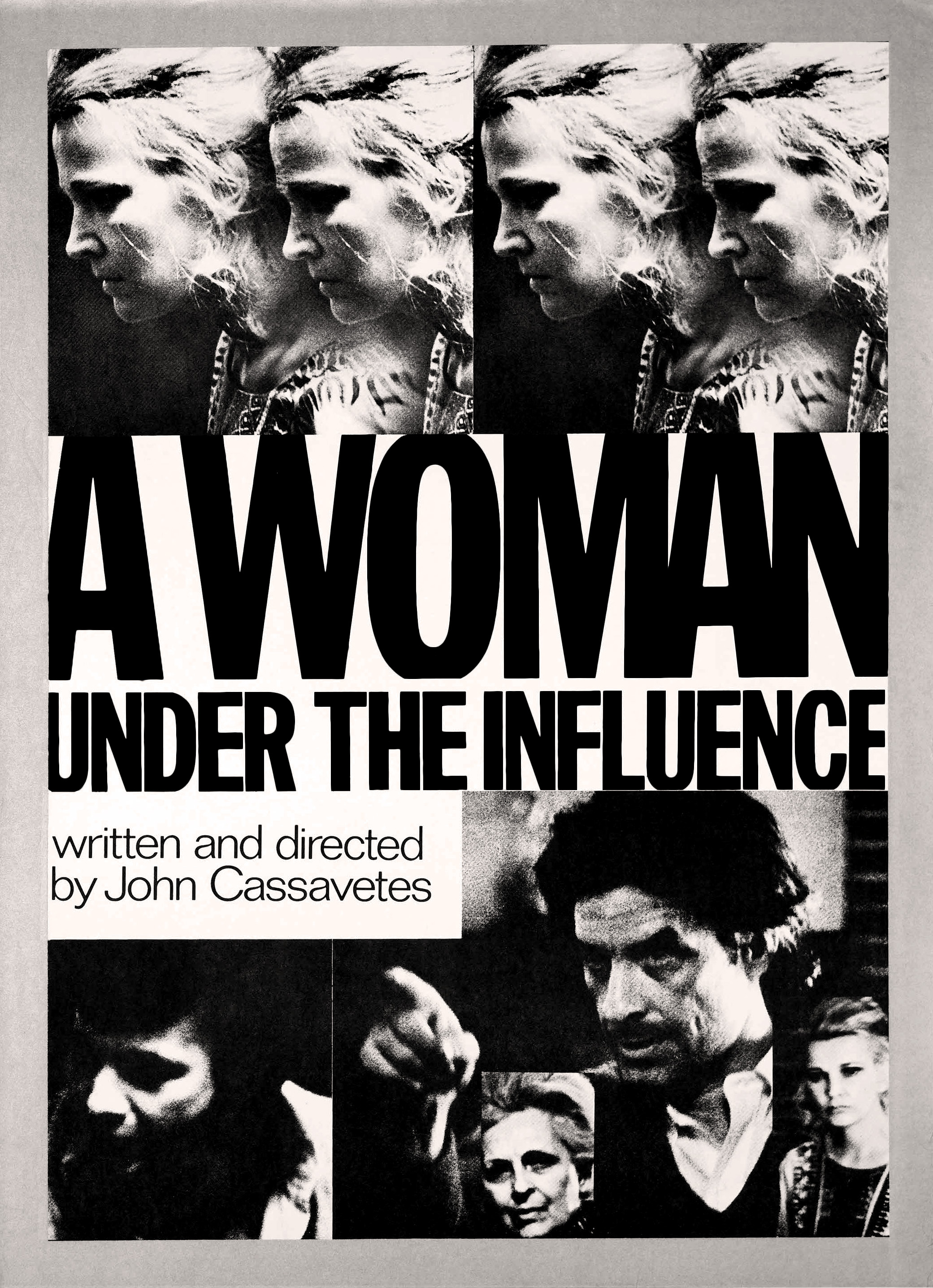
- Theatrical release poster
- Directed by: John Cassavetes
- Written by: John Cassavetes
- Produced by: Sam Shaw
- Starring: Peter Falk; Gena Rowlands
- Cinematography: Mike Ferris; David Nowell
- Edited by: David Armstrong; Sheila Viseltear; Beth Bergeron
- Music by: Bo Harwood
- Production company: Faces International Films
- Distributed by: Faces Distribution
- Release date: November 18, 1974
- Running time: 146 minutes
- Country: United States
- Language: English
- Budget: $1 million
- Box office: $6.1 million (N. American rentals)

A Woman Under the Influence is a 1974 American drama film written and directed by John Cassavetes, and starring his wife Gena Rowlands and close friend Peter Falk. Rowlands plays a housewife whose unusual behavior leads to conflict with her blue-collar husband (Falk) and family.

The film was Cassavetes' seventh as director, and was produced and distributed independently of major studios like most of his other films. The movie exhibits a highly naturalistic style in acting and camerawork compared to most Hollywood films from the era. It premiered at the 1974 New York Film Festival, before going into wide theatrical release on November 18, 1974. It received two Academy Award nominations: for Best Director and Best Actress (for Rowlands). Rowlands won a Golden Globe Award and National Board of Review Award for her performance.

Since its release, the film has been regarded as Cassavetes' magnum opus, with Rowlands' performance often being cited as one of the best of all time. In 1990, the Library of Congress selected the film for preservation in the United States National Film Registry for being "culturally, historically or aesthetically significant", being one of the first fifty films to be listed. The film featured in Sight and Sound's 2012 list of the greatest films of all time on both critics and directors polls.

== Plot ==
Although she is hesitant to do so, Mabel Longhetti, a Los Angeles housewife and mother who exhibits strange behavior, sends her three young children—Tony, Angelo, and Maria—to spend the night with her mother so she and her husband, Nick, can have a date night. Unfortunately, Nick, who is the foreman of a utility crew, has to cancel to fix a burst water main. Alone and drunk, Mabel goes to a bar and behaves very familiarly to a stranger named Garson Cross, who takes her home. She is almost unconscious by the time they get there, and Garson rapes her while she feebly attempts to fight him off.

The next morning, a confused Mabel briefly argues with Garson—whom she confuses by calling him "Nick"—before he leaves. Nick brings his 11-member crew to the house for breakfast after their long night, and Mabel makes everyone spaghetti. She is very polite to Nick's colleagues, but she asks several of them for their names, even though they have met before. The meal is superficially pleasant, until Nick snaps at Mabel for making one of his men feel uncomfortable by being overly warm to him, and the men use a phone call from Nick's mother as an excuse to make a hurried exit.

Mabel hosts a play date, but the father of the other children, Harold Jensen, is disturbed by her behavior and reluctant to leave his children alone with her. Nick comes home with his mother, Margaret, to find all of the children half-naked and running wild, with Jensen trying to get his children dressed. He slaps Mabel and gets into a fistfight with an angry Jensen, but Margaret breaks them up, and Jensen leaves with his children.

At his wits' end, Nick calls Mabel's doctor, Dr. Zepp, to evaluate her mental health. Mabel gets worked up, particularly by the presence of her mother-in-law, who calls Mabel a bad wife and an unfit mother when Nick is trying to calm her down. She becomes increasingly detached from reality, and violently resists when Dr. Zepp tries give to her a sedative injection. Convinced she has become a threat to herself and others, Dr. Zepp has Mabel involuntarily committed.

At work, Nick is on edge and yells at his coworkers when they ask about what happened with Mabel. Eddie, Nick's closest friend, remains quiet, but even this rubs Nick the wrong way. He yells at Eddie while Eddie is rappelling down a steep incline, and Eddie falls and gets injured. Afterward, Nick picks up his children from school early to go to the beach and allows them to sip his beer.

Six months later, Nick plans a large surprise welcome home party to celebrate Mabel's return from the hospital. However, his mother points out that this may be overwhelming for her, and Nick has her ask all of the guests who are not family to leave. When Mabel arrives, she is quiet and apprehensive, and no one else knows what to say, either. Nick tries his best to make Mabel feel comfortable, but, when she begins to joke around, he blows up and says they are going to have a normal conversation. Mabel says she does not know how to act without the routine provided by the hospital, which included therapies and medications and shock treatments, and she asks everyone to leave. While the guests get their coats, Mabel begins to dance on the couch while humming the theme from Swan Lake.

When Nick approaches Mabel, she runs into the bathroom and cuts her hand with a razor. He stops her, and she runs to the living room and climbs back up on the couch. The children, confused and concerned, try to protect Mabel by pushing Nick away from her. Nick slaps Mabel, knocking her to the floor, and then tries to put the children to bed, but they escape and go back to Mabel. Seeming somewhat recovered, Mabel, still bleeding, takes the children upstairs and tucks them in while they express their love for her. She and Nick go back downstairs, where he tends to her hand and they clean up and get ready for bed.

== Cast ==
From the American Film Institute:

- Peter Falk as Nick Longhetti, Mabel's husband
- Gena Rowlands as Mabel Longhetti, Nick's wife
- Fred Draper as George Mortensen, Mabel's father
- Lady Rowlands as Martha Mortensen, Mabel's mother
- Katherine Cassavetes as Margaret Longhetti, Nick's mother
- Matthew Laborteaux as Angelo Longhetti, Nick and Mabel's son
- Matthew Cassel as Tony Longhetti, Nick and Mabel's son
- Christina Grisanti as Maria Longhetti, Nick and Mabel's daughter
- George Dunn (credited as O.G. Dunn) as Garson Cross, the man Mabel picks up in a bar
- Mario Gallo as Harold Jensen, the father of some friends of the Longhetti children
- Eddie Shaw as Dr. Zepp, Mabel's doctor
- Angelo Grisanti as Vito Grimaldi, the member of Nick's crew who goes to the beach with Nick and his children
- Charles Horvath as Eddie, Nick's friend and the member of his crew who gets injured
- James Joyce as Bowman, a member of Nick's crew
- John Finnegan as Clancy, a member of Nick's crew
- Vince Barbi as Gino, the Italian member of Nick's crew, who suggests the baby boom is related to the moon landings
- Cliff Carnell as Aldo, the member of Nick's crew who wears a denim jacket
- Frank Richards as Adolph, a member of Nick's crew
- Hugh Hurd as Willie Johnson, the member of Nick's crew who sings
- Leon Wagner as Billy Tidrow, the member of Nick's crew who has trouble remembering all of his children
- Dominique Davalos as Dominique Jensen, Harold's daughter
- Xan Cassavetes as Adrienne Jensen, Harold's daughter
- Pancho Meisenheimer as John Jensen, Harold's son
- Sonny Aprile as Aldo, the party guest who wants to leave because he does not know Mabel
- Ellen Davalos as Nancy, Eddie's wife
- Joanne Moore Jordan as Muriel, the party guest who kisses Nick on the mouth
- John Hawker as Joseph Morton, the member of Nick's crew who spills his spaghetti
- Sil Words as James "Jimmy" Turner, a member of Nick's crew
- Elizabeth Deering as Angela, a relative at the party
- Jackie Peters as Tina, the relative who makes the food for the party
- Elsie Ames as Miss Hinkley, the Longhetti children's school principal
- Nicholas John Cassavetes (credited as N.J. Cassavetes) (Note: John Cassavetes' father; not to be confused with Nicholas David Rowland Cassavetes who is Cassavetes' and Rowlands' son) as Adolph, a friend of the Longhetti family

== Production ==
=== Development ===
Love within a family is a universal subject, but one that's always treated lightly. Films today show only a dream world and have lost touch with the way people really are... the idea in A Woman Under the Influence was a concept of how much you have to pay for love.

— John Cassavetes

John Cassavetes was inspired to write A Woman Under the Influence when his wife Gena Rowlands expressed a desire to appear in a play about the difficulties faced by contemporary women. His completed script was so intense and emotional that she knew she would be unable to perform it eight times a week, so he decided to adapt it for the screen. Real household recordings of the Cassavetes-Rowlands family were one source of inspiration for script dialogue. When he tried to raise funding for the film, Cassavetes was told that "No one wants to see a crazy, middle-aged dame." Lacking studio financing, he mortgaged his house and borrowed money from family and friends, one of whom was Peter Falk, who liked the screenplay so much that he turned down a role in The Day of the Dolphin and invested $500,000 in the project.

At the start, the crew consisted mainly of professionals and students from the American Film Institute, where Cassavetes was serving as the first "filmmaker in residence" at their Center for Advanced Film Studies. Cassavetes enlisted non-professional actors to play some roles, including many of his own family members. Working with a limited budget forced him to shoot scenes in a real house near Hollywood Boulevard, and Rowlands was responsible for her own hairstyling and makeup. Despite lacking funds for film stock before shooting, production proceeded after 10,000 feet (2 hours) of film mysteriously appeared the night before filming, with one legend claiming that it was stolen from a porno house.

=== Filming ===
John Cassavetes (pictured) filming a scene of A Woman Under The Influence

Filming took place in 65 days over twelve weeks starting in November 1972, shot on 35mm film on a Mitchell BNC, with the use of an Arri camera for hand-held recording. A few weeks into the shoot, the original cinematographer Caleb Deschanel was fired due to clashes with Cassavetes, leading to many of the initial crew members leaving alongside him. Deschanel was replaced by Mike Ferris, who had never shot a feature film at the time.

Although the film is largely scripted, Cassavetes did not allow full rehearsals or discussion between actors for most scenes, refused to answer questions that performers had about their roles, and sometimes did not clearly demarcate when filming had begun or ended in a take. The purpose of these restrictions was to allow for unplanned, complex interactions and authentic performances while filming. Rowlands' depiction of a mental breakdown was once so convincing that Cassavetes stopped the take and rushed to see if she was okay.

=== Sound and editing ===
Cassavetes enlisted Bo Harwood to create music for the film, and later also gave him the job of recording the film's audio. He had also enlisted Harwood to play music with a piano. Harwood, then an unemployed rock musician, was initially hesitant, as he had never made a soundtrack, played piano or done sound recording before, but accepted the job. An initial cut of the movie was 3 hours and 50 minutes long, which was then cut down to a 155 minute edit and then the final 147 minute runtime.

== Release ==
Upon completion of the film, Cassavetes was unable to find a distributor, so he personally called theater owners and asked them to show it. He got it booked at art houses and shown on college campuses, where he and Falk would discuss it with the audience. According to Jeff Lipsky, a college student who was hired to help distribute the film: "It was the first time in the history of motion pictures that an independent film was distributed without the use of a nationwide system of sub-distributors." Grossing $6 million, the film was Cassavetes’ biggest commercial success as director and its profits financed most of the production costs of his next two films, The Killing of a Chinese Bookie and Opening Night.

The film was screened at the San Sebastián Film Festival, where Rowlands was named Best Actress and Cassavetes won the Silver Shell Award for Best Director, and the New York Film Festival, where it captured the attention of such film critics as Rex Reed. When Richard Dreyfuss appeared on The Mike Douglas Show with Peter Falk, he described A Woman Under the Influence as "the most incredible, disturbing, scary, brilliant, dark, sad, depressing movie", and added that he "went crazy. I went home and vomited", which prompted curious audiences to seek out the film capable of making Dreyfuss (who is himself bipolar) ill.

=== Home media ===
In 1992, Touchstone Home Video released the film on VHS. On September 21, 2004, The Criterion Collection released the film—together with Shadows (1959), Faces (1968), The Killing of a Chinese Bookie (1976), and Opening Night (1977)—in Region 1 as part of the eight-disc DVD box set John Cassavetes: Five Films. Bonus features for the film include an audio commentary by composer and sound recordist Bo Harwood and camera operator Mike Ferris, a video conversation between Rowlands and Falk, an essay by film critic Kent Jones, and audio and written interviews with Cassavetes from 1975. On October 22, 2013, the box set was re-released on Blu-ray.

== Reception ==
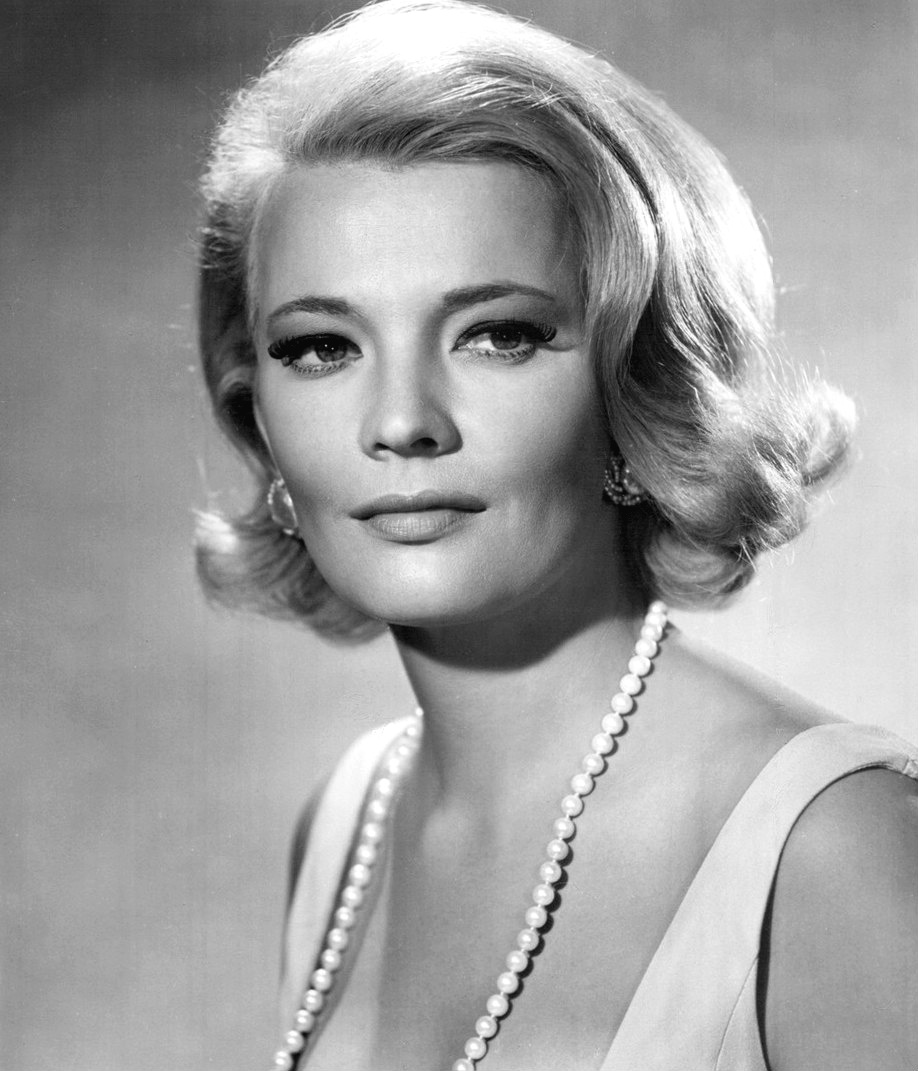
Gena Rowlands received widespread acclaim for her performance as Mabel Longhetti

On the review aggregator website Rotten Tomatoes, 88% of 40 critics' reviews of the film are positive; the site's "critics consensus" reads: "Electrified by searing performances from Gena Rowlands and Peter Falk, A Woman Under the Influence finds pioneering independent filmmaker John Cassavetes working at his artistic peak." Metacritic, which uses a weighted average, assigned the film a score of 88 out of 100, based on 16 critics, indicating "universal acclaim".

=== Contemporary reviews ===
Nora Sayre of The New York Times observed: "Miss Rowlands unleashes an extraordinary characterization. ... The actress's style of performing sometimes shows a kinship with that of the early Kim Stanley or the recent Joanne Woodward, but the notes of desperation are emphatically her own. ... Peter Falk gives a rousing performance ... and the children are very well directed. But the movie didn't need to be 2 hours and 35 minutes long: there's too much small talk, which doesn't really reveal character. Still, the most frightening scenes are extremely compelling, and this is a thoughtful film that does prompt serious discussion."

Roger Ebert of the Chicago Sun-Times gave the film four stars out of four, calling it "terribly complicated, involved and fascinating – a revelation", and saying: "The characters are larger than life (although not less convincing because of that), and their loves and rages, their fights and moments of tenderness, exist at exhausting levels of emotion. ... Cassavetes is strongest as a writer and filmmaker at creating specific characters and then sticking with them through long, painful, uncompromising scenes until we know them well enough to read them, to predict what they'll do next and even to begin to understand why." He later added the film to his "Great Movies" list, in which he called it "perhaps the greatest of Cassavetes' films".

Pauline Kael of The New Yorker, however, condemned the film as a "didactic illustration of (R.D.) Laing's version of insanity.” Stanley Kauffmann of The New Republic also panned the film in his 1974 review, writing: "To me this film is utterly without interest or merit". John Simon called the film "dreadful."

Time Out London wrote: "The brilliance of the film lies in its sympathetic and humorous exposure of social structure. Rowlands unfortunately overdoes the manic psychosis at times, and lapses into a melodramatic style which is unconvincing and unsympathetic; but Falk is persuasively insane as the husband; and the result is an astonishing, compulsive film, directed with a crackling energy." TV Guide gave the film four stars out of four, calling it "tough-minded", "moving", and "an insightful essay on sexual politics."

=== Legacy ===
In the years after its release, the film has continued to receive acclaim. Première listed Rowlands' performance as one of the "100 Greatest Movie Performances of All Time", and critic Jim Hemphill named her performance as "one of cinema’s all-time greatest". In Sight and Sound's 2012 poll of the greatest films of all time, the film placed 59th in the directors' poll and 144th in the critics' poll. In 2015, the BBC named A Woman Under the Influence the 31st greatest American film ever made. In 1990, the film was selected for preservation in the United States National Film Registry for being "culturally, historically, or aesthetically significant", one of the first fifty films to be listed. Since 2013, the film is one of the top 250 highest-rated narrative feature films on the aggregate rating website Letterboxd.

=== Accolades ===
Award	Category	Nominee(s)	Result	Ref.
Academy Awards	Best Director	John Cassavetes	Nominated	
Academy Awards	Best Actress	Gena Rowlands	Nominated	
Belgian Film Critics Association	Grand Prix		Won	
Golden Globe Awards	Best Motion Picture – Drama		Nominated	
Golden Globe Awards	Best Actress in a Motion Picture – Drama	Gena Rowlands	Won	
Golden Globe Awards	Best Director – Motion Picture	John Cassavetes	Nominated	
Golden Globe Awards	Best Screenplay – Motion Picture	John Cassavetes	Nominated	
Kansas City Film Critics Circle Awards	Best Actress	Gena Rowlands	Won	
National Board of Review Awards	Top Ten Films		6th Place	
National Board of Review Awards	Best Actress	Gena Rowlands	Won	
National Film Preservation Board	National Film Registry		Inducted	
New York Film Critics Circle Awards	Best Actress	Gena Rowlands	Runner-up	
San Sebastián International Film Festival	Silver Seashell	John Cassavetes	Won	
San Sebastián International Film Festival	Best Actress	Gena Rowlands	Won	
San Sebastián International Film Festival	OCIC Award (Honorable Mention)	John Cassavetes	Won	
Writers Guild of America Awards	Best Drama – Written Directly for the Screen	John Cassavetes	Nominated	

== Analysis ==
In a 1975 critical analysis, David Degener argued the film remained ambiguous about concepts such as “madness", but ultimately criticized it for this ambiguity, claiming that it “didn’t tell me anything about women and madness” while comparing it to the writing of feminist Phyllis Chesler.

== In popular culture ==
The film is referenced in the Gilmore Girls episode "To Live and Let Diorama", which is a favorite movie of showrunner Amy Sherman-Palladino. It contains a direct imitation of a scene in the film, where Mabel is on the street asking passersby for the time.

== Restoration and preservation ==
The world premiere screening of a restored print of the film was held at the Castro Theatre in San Francisco on April 26, 2009, as part of the San Francisco International Film Festival. Gena Rowlands attended the premiere and spoke briefly. The restoration was performed by the UCLA Film and Television Archive, with funding provided by Gucci and The Film Foundation.

== See also ==
- List of American films of 1974
- Mental illness in film
- Bipolar disorder

== Bibliography ==
- Carney, Ray (2001). "A Woman Under The Influence". Cassavetes on Cassavetes. Farrar, Straus and Giroux. pp. 319–351. ISBN 9780571201570.
