= Lady Rowlands =

American actress (1904–1999)

- Born: Mary Allen Neal; April 12, 1904; Fort Smith, Arkansas, U.S.
- Died: May 28, 1999 (aged 95); Los Angeles, California, U.S.
- Occupation: Actress
- Spouse: Edwin Myrwyn Rowlands (m. 1924; died 1961)
- Children: 2, including Gena Rowlands
- Family: Nick Cassavetes (grandson); Alexandra Cassavetes (granddaughter); Zoe Cassavetes (granddaughter)

Lady Rowlands (born Mary Allen Neal; April 12, 1904 – May 28, 1999) was an American film actress. Most of her work came in the films of John Cassavetes, who was married to her daughter, actress Gena Rowlands.

== Life and career ==
Rowlands was the daughter of Tennessee Virginia (née Hickey) and William Joel Neal, who was of Irish descent. She was married to Edwin Myrwyn Rowlands, a Welsh-American banker and statesman, with whom she lived in Cambria, Wisconsin. They had two children, David and Virginia (later known as Gena Rowlands). She lived as a housewife, but practiced music, acting and painting as hobbies.

Rowlands later moved to California along with her daughter and son-in-law, actor John Cassavetes. Cassavetes began directing films, and cast Rowlands in three of his pictures. She adopted the screen-name "Lady Rowlands", a nickname given by her grandchildren. In Minnie and Moskowitz (1971) and A Woman Under the Influence (1974), she played the mother of her real-life daughter. Her home was used for the filming of Faces (1968) and The Killing of a Chinese Bookie (1976).

Aside from her work with Cassavetes, Rowlands also appeared in two television movies and had a role in the film Ted & Venus (1991).

Her grandchildren, Nick Cassavetes, Alexandra Cassavetes and Zoe Cassavetes, are all actors and film directors.

== Filmography ==
Year	Title	Role	Notes
1971	Minnie and Moskowitz	Georgia Moore	
1974	Unwed Father		TV movie
1974	The Teacher	Gossiping Lady 2	
1974	A Woman Under the Influence	Martha Mortensen	
1977	Opening Night	Melva Drake	
1978	Dr. Strange	Mrs. Sullivan	
1991	Ted & Venus	Linda's Grandmother	(final film role)
