= Fort McCoy =

Fort McCoy may refer to:

- Fort McCoy, Florida, a community in Marion County
- Fort McCoy (Wisconsin), a military base
- Fort McCoy (film), a 2011 film
