= Fred Draper =

American actor

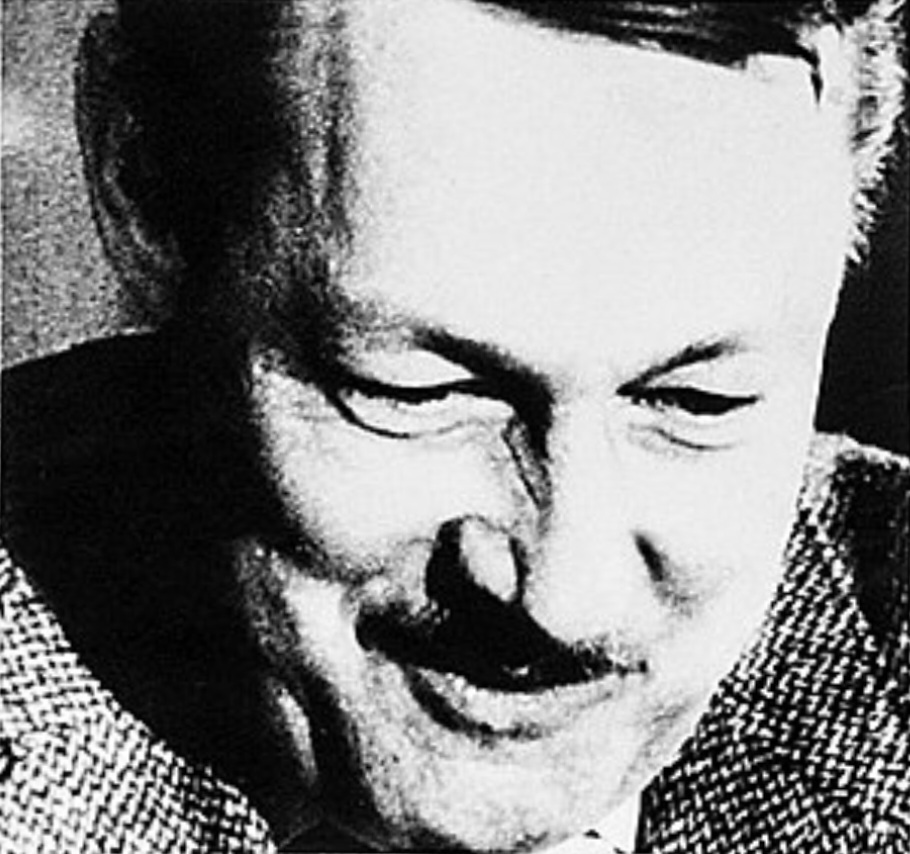
- Fred Draper from a poster promoting Faces (1968)
- Born: Frederick Paul Draper II; September 2, 1923; Chester, Pennsylvania, U.S.
- Died: December 26, 1999 (aged 76); Rancho Cucamonga, California, U.S.
- Occupation: Actor
- Years active: 1957–1977

Frederick Paul Draper II (September 2, 1923 – December 26, 1999) was an American film and television actor. He was roommates in New York City with Harry Mastrogeorge and John Cassavetes while attending The American Academy of Dramatic Arts, New York with Grace Kelly, Anne Bancroft and others. He graduated May 1, 1950. He appeared on numerous television programs and films.

Born in Chester, Pennsylvania, he appeared in four films directed by Cassavetes, Faces, Husbands, A Woman Under the Influence, and Opening Night. He also played different roles in six episodes of the Peter Falk detective series Columbo.

== Filmography ==
Year	Title	Role	Notes
1957	M Squad	Detective Lt. Wade	Episode: "Street of Fear"
1958	The Adventures of Jim Bowie	Wiley Baker	Episode: "Charivari"
1963	A Child Is Waiting	Dr. Sack	Uncredited
1965	Alfred Hitchcock Presents	Dr. Hornbeck	Season 3 Episode 29: "Off Season"
1965	Kraft Suspense Theatre	Mark's Father	Episode: "Kill Me on July 20th"
1966-1969	Peyton Place	Bartender Fred	6 episodes, Uncredited
1968	Faces	Freddie Draper	
1970	Husbands: A Comedy About Life, Death and Freedom		
1971-1976	Columbo	Joseph / Swanny Swanson / David Morris / Lab Tech / Murcheson / Cab Driver	6 episodes
1974	Police Woman	Distinguished Guest	Episode: "Seven Eleven"
1974	A Woman Under the Influence	George Mortensen	
1977	Future Cop	Lieutenant Commander	Episode: "The Mad Mad Bomber"
1977	Opening Night	Leo	(final film role)

== Death ==
He retired to Rancho Cucamonga, California, where he died at age 76.
