= Seymour Cassel =

American actor (1935–2019)

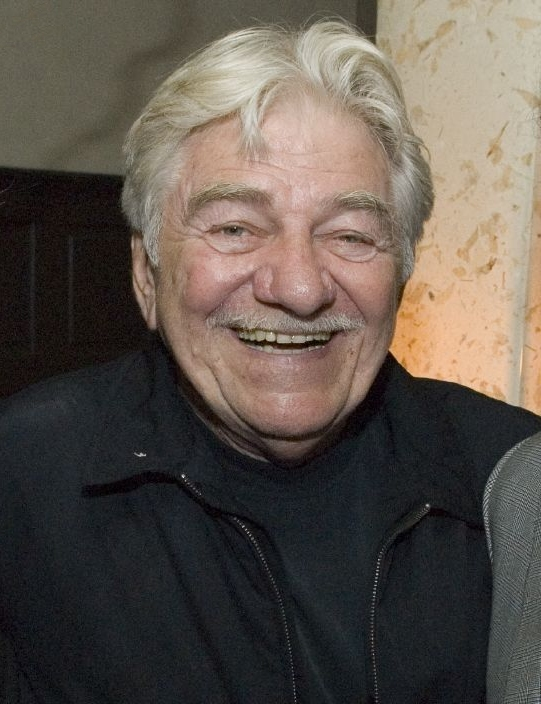
- Cassel in 2007
- Born: Seymour Joseph Cassel; January 22, 1935; Detroit, Michigan, U.S.
- Died: April 7, 2019 (aged 84); Los Angeles, California, U.S.
- Occupation: Actor
- Years active: 1959–2015
- Spouse: Elizabeth Deering (m. 1964; div. 1983)
- Children: 2

Seymour Joseph Cassel (January 22, 1935 – April 7, 2019) was an American actor who appeared in over 200 films and television shows, with a career spanning over 50 years. He first came to prominence in the 1960s in the pioneering independent films of writer/director John Cassavetes. The first of these was Too Late Blues (1961), followed by Faces (1968), for which he was nominated for an Academy Award and won a National Society of Film Critics Award. Cassel went on to appear in Cassavetes's Minnie and Moskowitz (1971), The Killing of a Chinese Bookie (1976), Opening Night (1977), and Love Streams (1984).

He also appeared in other notable films, including: Coogan's Bluff (1968), The Last Tycoon (1976), Valentino (1977), Convoy (1978), Johnny Be Good (1988), Mobsters (1991), In the Soup (1992), Honeymoon in Vegas (1992), Indecent Proposal (1993), It Could Happen to You (1993), Imaginary Crimes (1994), The Sleepy Time Gal (2001), Beer League (2006), and Fort McCoy (2011). Like Cassavetes, Wes Anderson frequently cast Cassel — first in Rushmore (1998), then in The Royal Tenenbaums (2001), and finally in The Life Aquatic with Steve Zissou (2004).

== Early life ==
Cassel was born in Detroit, Michigan, the son of Pancretia Ann (née Kearney), a performer, and Seymour Joseph Cassel, a nightclub owner.

His mother was remarried to a master sergeant in the U.S. Army Air Forces, and the family moved to Panama, where Cassel's stepfather was said to have won a nightclub in a game of craps. After his mother filed for divorce in the late 1940s, she sent Seymour to live with his godmother in Detroit, where he soon joined a gang. He later said that at 17, he was given a choice: join the Navy, or go to jail. He picked the military, and after three years of service and a brief stint in college, he returned to Detroit, where he built props for a theater company and took small acting roles. Convinced he had a future in theater, he bought a bus ticket to New York, only to bomb at an Actors Studio audition.

== Career ==
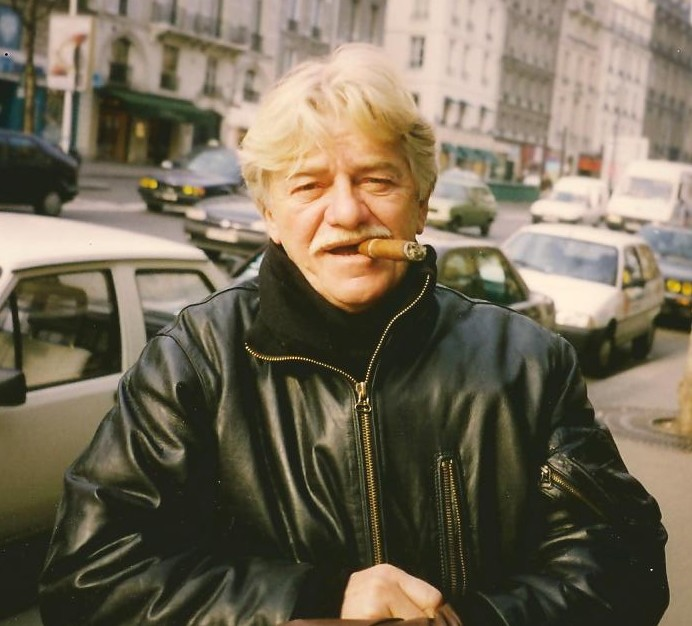
Cassel in 1995

Cassel's early career was tied to fellow actor John Cassavetes, who was informally part of his clan of actors. He made his film debut in the first film Cassavetes directed, Shadows, on which he also served as associate producer. In 1961 he co-starred with Cassavetes in Too Late Blues and 1962's The Webster Boy.

Cassel also appeared in The Lloyd Bridges Show in the episode "A Pair of Boots", directed by his friend Cassavetes. Cassel appeared on such popular programs as Twelve O'Clock High, Combat!, Voyage to the Bottom of the Sea, and The F.B.I. He also appeared as "Cancelled", one of Colonel Gumm's henchmen in the 1960s Batman TV episode "A Piece of the Action", which also featured guest stars Van Williams and Bruce Lee as The Green Hornet and Kato, respectively.

In 1968, Cassel was nominated for the Academy Award for Best Supporting Actor for his role as Chet in John Cassavetes's Faces. Other collaborations with Cassavetes included a starring role with Gena Rowlands in Minnie and Moskowitz (1971), supporting roles in The Killing of a Chinese Bookie (1976) and Love Streams (1984), and a cameo appearance in Opening Night (1977).

Cassel appeared in many major Hollywood productions such as Coogan's Bluff (1968), The Last Tycoon (1976), Valentino (1977), Convoy (1978), Tin Men (1987), Johnny Be Good (1988), Dick Tracy (1990), Mobsters (1991), In the Soup (1992), Honeymoon in Vegas (1992), Indecent Proposal (1993), It Could Happen to You (1993), Imaginary Crimes (1994), Beer League (2006), and Fort McCoy (2011). He was also very supportive of the American independent film community, especially in the wake of Cassavetes's death. Cassel had a small role in Steve Buscemi's directorial debut Trees Lounge (1996) and appeared in three films by Wes Anderson: Rushmore (1998), The Royal Tenenbaums (2001) and The Life Aquatic (2004). He had a featured role alongside Jacqueline Bisset in Christopher Münch's critically acclaimed low-budget drama The Sleepy Time Gal (2001). Cassel appeared for four seasons on comedian Tracey Ullman's television series Tracey Takes On....

== Personal life ==
Cassel married Elizabeth Deering in 1964; they had two children before divorcing in 1983.

Guitarist Slash, who was childhood friends with Cassel's son, credited Cassel with giving him his nickname, because he was "always zipping from one place to another and never sitting still."

Cassel died on April 7, 2019, aged 84, of Alzheimer's disease.

== Accolades ==
In 2009, the San Diego Film Festival awarded the actor with the Indie Icon Award.

In 2012, the Oldenburg Film Festival in Germany introduced an actors' prize named the Seymour Cassel Award.

He won the National Society of Film Critics Awards, USA award for Best Supporting Actor for his role in Faces.

== Filmography ==
=== Film ===
Year	Title	Role	Notes
1958	Shadows	Minor role	Uncredited
1960	Man on a String	Hotel Pageboy	Uncredited
1960	Juke Box Racket	Seymour	
1960	Murder, Inc.	Teenager	Uncredited
1961	Too Late Blues	Red	
1962	The Webster Boy	Vic	
1963	The Nutty Professor	Bored Man	Uncredited
1964	The Killers	Postal Clerk	
1968	Coogan's Bluff	John, Young Hood	
1968	Faces	Chet	Nominated — Academy Award for Best Supporting Actor
1968	The Sweet Ride	Surfer, Cyclist	Uncredited
1970	The Revolutionary	Leonard II	
1971	Minnie and Moskowitz	Moskowitz	
1975	Two Tons of Turquoise to Taos Tonight	Wise Guy	Uncredited
1976	The Killing of a Chinese Bookie	Mort Weil	
1976	The Last Tycoon	Seal Trainer	Credited as Seymour Cassell
1977	Death Game	George Manning	
1977	Black Oak Conspiracy	Homer Metcalf	
1977	Valentino	George Ullman	
1977	Scott Joplin	Dr. Jaelki	Credited as Seymour Cassell
1977	Opening Night	unknown role	Uncredited
1978	Convoy	Governor Haskins	
1979	California Dreaming	Duke Slusarski	
1979	Ravagers	Blind Lawyer	
1979	Sunburn	Dobbs	
1980	The Mountain Men	La Bont	
1980	The Jazz Singer	Unnamed	
1981	King of the Mountain	Barry Tanner	
1982	Double Exposure	Dr. Frank Curtis	
1984	Love Streams	Jack Lawson	
1986	Eye of the Tiger	Sheriff	
1987	Tin Men	Cheese	
1987	Best Seller	Carter	Uncredited
1987	Survival Game	Dave Forrest	
1987	Plain Clothes	Ed Malmburg	
1988	Johnny Be Good	Wallace Gibson	
1988	Colors	Sullivan	
1988	Track 29	Dr. Bernard	
1989	Wicked Stepmother	Feldshine, Magick Shop Owner	
1990	Dick Tracy	Sam Catchem	
1990	Cold Dog Soup	Jojo	
1991	White Fang	Skunker	
1991	Mobsters	Father Bonotto	
1991	Cold Heaven	Tom Farrelly	
1991	Diary of a Hitman	Koenig	
1992	In the Soup	Joe	
1992	Bad Love	Uncle Bud	
1992	Chain of Desire	Mel	
1992	Honeymoon in Vegas	Tony Cataracts	
1992	Adventures in Spying	Ray Rucker	
1992	What Happened to Pete	Bartender	Short
1993	Trouble Bound	Santino	
1993	Indecent Proposal	Mr. Shackleford	
1993	Boiling Point	Leach	
1993	When Pigs Fly	Frank	
1994	Hand Gun	Jack McCallister	
1994	Chasers	Master Chief Bogg	
1994	It Could Happen to You	Jack Gross	
1994	There Goes My Baby	Pop	
1994	Dark Side of Genius	Samuel Rourke	
1994	Imaginary Crimes	Eddie	
1994	Whew!	unknown role	Short
1994	Tollbooth	Larry, Leon	
1995	Dead Presidents	Saul	Uncredited
1996	Things I Never Told You	Frank	
1996	Dream for an Insomniac	Uncle Leo	
1996	Trees Lounge	Uncle Al	
1996	Slaughter of the Cock	Ahilleas	
1996	Dead Girl	Ira Golub	
1996	Chameleon	Francis	
1996	Juicehead	Dr. Watt	Short
1996	Turnpike	Older man	Short
1996	The Last Home Run	Older Jonathan	
1996	Seed	First Client	Short
1997	This World, Then the Fireworks	Detective Harris	
1997	Cannes Man	Sy Lerner	
1997	Obsession	Jacob Frischumuth	
1997	Motel Blue	Capistrano Minister	
1998	Johnny 316	Minor Role	
1998	Relax...It's Just Sex	Emile Pillsbury	
1998	Hoods	Pop Martinelli	Uncredited
1998	The Treat	Chip O'Herlihee	
1998	Snapped	Bob	
1998	Rushmore	Bert Fischer	
1998	Stingers	unknown role	
1999	Getting to Know You	unknown role	
1999	Temps	Arthur, the studio president	
1999	Ballad of the Nightingale	Jimmy	
1999	Smoking Cuban Style	Dragan	
1999	Me and Will	Roy	
1999	Black and White	Sal	
2000	Animal Factory	Lieutenant Seeman	
2000	The Crew	Tony "Mouth" Donato	
2000	Just One Night	Arthur Imperial	
2000	Next Stop, Eternity	Lawrence	Short
2001	The Sleepy Time Gal	Bob	
2001	61*	Sam Simon	
2001	Bartleby	Frank Waxman	
2001	Women of the Night	Sally	
2001	The Cure for Bordom	Eddie	
2001	The Royal Tenenbaums	Dusty	
2001	The Chameleon	Richard Cavanaugh	
2002	Passionada	Daniel Vargas	
2002	Sonny	Albert	
2002	Stealing Harvard	Uncle Jack	
2002	Manna from Heaven	Stanley	
2002	The Burial Society	Sam Goldberg	
2002	Time & Again	Steve	Short film
2002	The Biz	Eugene Hinkle	
2003	Wishing Time	The Angel	Short film
2003	A Good Night to Die	Guy	
2003	Stuck on You	Morty O'Reilly	
2004	Sweet Underground	Wally	
2004	Thanksgiving	Del	Short film
2004	The Life Aquatic with Steve Zissou	Esteban du Plantier	
2005	Lonesome Jim	Don	
2005	The Wendell Baker Story	Boyd Fullbright	
2005	Bittersweet Place	Jack "Pappy" Schaffer	
2005	The Tenants	Levenspiel	
2005	Before It Had a Name	Jeff	
2005	Main Street	Big Business	Short film
2005	Welcome to California	Jim's Father	
2005	Circadian Rhythm	Hoover	
2006	Bye Bye Benjamin	Mr. Ruby	Short film
2006	Sea of Dreams	Tomaso	
2006	Hollywood Dreams	Rupert	
2006	Ray of Sunshine	Victor	
2006	Property	The Superintendent	Short film
2006	Beer League	Dirt	
2007	Chasing 3000	Poppy	
2007	The Happiest Day of His Life	Mr. Jacobs	
2007	Postal	Paul	
2008	Beau Jest	Abe Goldman	
2008	Barbiere, IL	Mort	
2008	Big Heart City	Larry	
2008	Reach for Me	Alvin	
2009	Little New York	Jasper Sabiano	
2009	Not Dead Yet	Francis	
2010	Kissing Strangers	Mr. Koster	
2010	Pete Smalls Is Dead	Saco	
2010	Now Here	Commissioner	
2011	Fort McCoy	Father Mivkovek	
2011	Without Borders	Detective McKenneth	
2011	Life Happens	Pop Pop	
2011	Freerunner	Gramps	
2011	Pass the Salt, Please	Man	Short film
2012	Silver Case	Dealer	
2012	Booster	Harold	
2012	Broken Kingdom	Clayton	
2012	Lost Angeles	Film Critic	
2013	The Secret Lives of Dorks	Principal	
2014	The Dependables	Dominic Ackers	
2014	The Algerian	Professor Wright	
2014	At the Maple Grove	Boyle	
2015	Silver Case: Director's Cut	Dealer	
2015	Lucky Dog	The Real Spencer	
2021	Cosmic Radio	Malcolm Stone	
TBR	Time Framed	Boris Esla	Completed

=== Television ===
Year	Title	Role	Notes
1959	Naked City	Student	Episode: "Hey, Teach!"; uncredited
1959	Deadline	Flyer	Episode: "Return to Murder"
1962–1963	The Lloyd Bridges Show	Lawyer #2, Richard	2 episodes
1963	Alcoa Premiere	Unknown role	Episode: "Million Dollar Hospital"
1963	Wagon Train	Ed	Episode: "The Sam Pulaski Story"
1964	The Twilight Zone	Jerry	Episode: "The Self-Improvement of Salvadore Ross"; uncredited
1964	Burke's Law	Attendant	Episode: "Who Killed Annie Foran?"
1964	Bob Hope Presents the Chrysler Theatre	Somebody	Episode: "The Game with Glass Pieces"
1964	Combat!	Doctor	Episode: "Point of View"
1964	The Hanged Man	Bellboy	Television film, uncredited
1965	Laredo	Jude	Episode: "I See by Your Outfit"
1965	Convoy	Phelps	Episode: "Admiral Do-Right"
1965–1966	12 O'Clock High	Captain Johnson, Mechanic, Left Waist Gunner, B-17 Pilot	5 episodes
1965–1967	The F.B.I.	Attendant, P.O.W. Vanndo, Irwin	3 episodes
1966	My Three Sons	Coach Gregson	Episode: "Call Her Max"
1966–1968	Voyage to the Bottom of the Sea	Jensen	2 episodes
1967	Batman	Cancelled	2 episodes
1967	The Invaders	Driver	Episode: "The Condemned"
1967	The Fugitive	Cabbie	Episode: "The Judgement"
1967	Cimarron Strip	Spock	Episode: "The Battleground"
1971	Young Marrieds at Play	Adam	Television film
1972	Emergency!	Bluebell Hunter	Episode: "Dilemma"
1973	Nightside	Ralph	Television film
1977	Scott Joplin	Dr. Jaelki	Television film
1980	Angel on My Shoulder	Smiley Mitchell	Television film
1983	Blood Feud	Frank Kierdoff, Hoffa Enforcer, Torch	Television film
1983	I Want to Live	John Santo	Television film
1983	Rage	unknown role	Television film
1986	Beverly Hills Madam	Tony	Television film
1987	Tales from the Darkside	Howard	Episode: "The Milkman Cometh"
1987	Hooperman	Bum	Episode: "Deck the Cell with Bars of Folly"
1988	Ohara	Todd Ames	Episode: "X"
1988	Star Trek: The Next Generation	Lieutenant Commander Hester Dealt	Episode: "The Child"
1988	Matlock	Dick Silvers, Honest Earl Edwards	2 episodes
1989	Sweet Bird of Youth	Hatcher	Television film
1991	Dead in the Water	Lt. Frank Vaness	Television film
1991	Face of a Stranger	Ralph	Television film
1993	Partners	unknown role	Television film
1994–1995	Under Suspicion	Lieutenant Mickey Schwartz	Series regular (17 episodes)
1996	Good Company	Jack O'Shea	Series regular (6 episodes)
1996–1999	Tracey Takes On...	Candy Casino	Recurring role (9 episodes)
1997	Chicago Hope	Norman Cambridge	Episode: "Second Chances"
1997	The Last Don	Alfred Gronevelt	Miniseries (2 episodes)
1997	The Player	unknown role	Television film
1998	Emma's Wish	Harry	Television film
2001	Boston Public	Bernie Willis	Episode: "Chapter Fourteen"
2001	61*	Sam Simon	Television film
2002	Arli$$	Artie	Episode: "Moments to Remember"
2002	A Nero Wolfe Mystery	James Arthur, Dazy Perrit	2 episodes
2003	Lucky	The Trake	3 episodes
2003	Gary the Rat	Man in Panda Suit	Voice, episode: "Manrattan"
2005	Justice League Unlimited	Chuck Sirianni	Voice, episode: "I Am Legion"
2006	Heist	Pops	6 episodes
2007	ER	Alfred Gower	Episode: "Photographs and Memories"
2008	To Love and Die	Grandfather	Television film
2009	Crash	Julian Gold	Episode: "The Pain Won't Stop"
2009	Flight of the Conchords	Johnny Boy	Episode: "The Tough Brets"
2010	Back Nine	Mondo	Television film
2011	Funny or Die...	King of Police	"#2.10" (segment "United States Police Department")
2011	Circling the Drain	Fuzzy Kaye	Television film
2012	Regular Show	Tony	Voice, episode: "Bald Spot"
2012	FCU: Fact Checkers Unit	Old Man	Episode: "James Franco Is Preggers"
