= Hi Octane =

1994 American TV magazine program

Hi Octane is a 1994 American television series that aired on Comedy Central. It was directed by Sofia Coppola. It consisted of interviews and sketches hosted by Coppola and Zoe Cassavetes. Only three of the four episodes recorded were broadcast.

Although the series comprised only four 22-minute episodes, it featured many high-profile celebrity guests, including Martin Scorsese, Naomi Campbell, Kim Gordon, Debbie Harry, the Beastie Boys, Karl Lagerfeld, Thurston Moore, Shawn Mortensen, Keanu Reeves, Jenny Shimizu, Christy Turlington, Gus Van Sant, Anna Wintour, and Nicolas Cage.
