= Edwin Myrwyn Rowlands =

American politician (1901–1961)

Chairman of the Wisconsin Progressive Party
- In office 1934–1936

Member of the Wisconsin Senate from the 27th district
- In office April 9, 1935 – January 4, 1937
- Preceded by: Fred W. Zantow
- Succeeded by: Jess Miller

Member of the Wisconsin State Assembly from the Columbia County district
- In office January 3, 1927 – April 9, 1935
- Preceded by: Robert Caldwell
- Succeeded by: William F. Groves

Personal details
- Born: April 1, 1901 Cambria, Wisconsin, U.S.
- Died: March 28, 1961 (aged 59) Harris County, Texas, U.S.
- Spouse: Mary Allen Neal (m. 1924)
- Children: 2, including Gena Rowlands
- Relatives: Nick Cassavetes (grandson); Alexandra Cassavetes (granddaughter); Zoe Cassavetes (granddaughter)
- Occupation: Politician

Edwin Myrwyn Rowlands (April 1, 1901 – March 28, 1961) was a Welsh-American member of the Wisconsin State Assembly and the Wisconsin State Senate.

== Biography ==
Edwin Rowlands was born on April 1, 1901 in Cambria, Wisconsin. The son of Emma (née Davies) and David Morris Rowlands, he had an elder brother named Morris. The Rowlands were of Welsh descent.

During his childhood he attended elementary school in Cambria, and later attended St. John's Northwestern Military Academy in Delafield, Wisconsin. After his graduation he attended Ripon College and the University of Wisconsin–Madison.

On September 10, 1924, in Arkansas, he married Mary Allen Neal, who became an actress in her later years, and was known as Lady Rowlands. They had two children: a son, David, and a daughter, Virginia, who is best known as the Emmy Award-winning and Academy Award-nominated actress Gena Rowlands.

Rowlands served in the Assembly from 1927 until April 1935, when he was elected to the Senate in an April 1935 in a special election. Rowlands served as a state senator until 1937 as he had unsuccessfully run for the progressive nomination for State Treasurer against Solomon Levitan. He was also Chairman of the Wisconsin Progressive Party.

Edwin Myrwyn Rowlands died in 1961 in Harris County, Texas, aged 59.
