= Minnie and Moskowitz =

1971 film by John Cassavetes

- Theatrical release poster
- Directed by: John Cassavetes
- Written by: John Cassavetes
- Produced by: Al Ruban
- Starring: Gena Rowlands; Seymour Cassel
- Cinematography: Arthur J. Ornitz; Alric Edens; Michael Margulies
- Edited by: Fred Knudtson
- Music by: Bo Harwood
- Distributed by: Universal Pictures
- Release date: December 22, 1971
- Running time: 114 minutes
- Country: United States
- Language: English
- Budget: $900,000

Minnie and Moskowitz is a 1971 American romantic comedy-drama film written and directed by John Cassavetes and starring his wife Gena Rowlands and Seymour Cassel as the titular characters.

== Plot ==
Seymour Moskowitz is an eccentric and uncouth parking attendant who has just moved from New York City to Los Angeles. Minnie Moore is a museum curator in an abusive relationship with a married man named Jim. Following their fight, she becomes disillusioned with love and meaningful relationships. Minnie talks with her co-worker and friend Florence about getting older and her chances of finding the right man.

The next day, Florence sets Minnie up on a blind date with a bitter and loudmouthed widower, Zelmo. The date goes badly and ends with Zelmo chasing her out of the restaurant. Seymour, working the parking lot, witnesses the commotion and engages in a physical altercation with Zelmo. Seymour wins the fight, bloodying Zelmo's face, and Zelmo drives away crying, stranding Minnie. Seymour offers to give her a ride, which she refuses, but he pursues her in his truck and forces her inside. He drives her to her workplace, the Los Angeles County Museum of Art. Jim is waiting inside with his son and ends the relationship, revealing that his wife has attempted suicide. Infuriated and hurt, Minnie slaps Jim.

Seymour appears at Minnie's house to confront her about costing him his job at the parking lot. He takes her to a bar for a drink and then proclaims his love for her at a hot-dog stand. He berates her for taking herself too seriously when she does not return his affections. After leaving Minnie, Seymour brings a woman to his apartment who stays overnight.

Seymour takes Minnie to an ice-cream parlor and a country-and-western bar. In the parking lot, they dance to the music and kiss. When Minnie fails to introduce Seymour to her wealthy friends on the way into the bar, he angrily drives away and strands her, just as Zelmo had done. A wealthy male friend drives her home, where Seymour is waiting. The men fight, injuring Minnie in the process.

Seymour brings Minnie inside to recover, where she admits that she does not see a future with Seymour. Insisting that they are meant for each other, he threatens to kill himself and then cuts his walrus moustache in a frenzy. Minnie finally agrees to marry him and tells her mother about the news. Minnie and Seymour go to dinner with their mothers, who are hesitant and dubious about the marriage. Seymour's mother calls him a "bum" and tells Minnie that she could do much better than her son. Minnie's mother is overwhelmed and nearly speechless at the abruptness of the news and Seymour's appearance and personality.

Minnie and Seymour marry, laughing as the minister forgets his lines and fumbles for his notes. A flashforward shows a sunny backyard birthday party, possibly for their own child.

== Cast ==
- Gena Rowlands as Minnie Moore
- Seymour Cassel as Seymour Moskowitz
- Val Avery as Zelmo Swift
- Timothy Carey (credited as Tim Carey) as Morgan Morgan
- Katherine Cassavetes as Sheba Moskowitz
- Elsie Ames as Florence
- Lady Rowlands as Georgia Moore
- Holly Near as Irish
- Judith Roberts as wife
- David Rowlands as minister
- Kathleen O'Malley
- John Cassavetes as Jim (uncredited)
- Alexandra Cassavetes as young girl in ballet tutu (uncredited)
- Zoe R. Cassavetes as baby girl (uncredited)

== Production ==
Minnie and Moskowitz is among a small number of low-budget (less than $1 million) films bankrolled by Universal Studios in the early 1970s in an attempt to copy the success of Easy Rider. Several months after the film's release, Universal Studios shortened the film's running time by excising a scene near the beginning of the film, but doing so violated the studio's contract with Cassavetes. All releases (including the DVD) since that time are missing this scene.

Principal photography took place from late March to mid-Jun 1971 in Los Angeles and New York City.

== Reception ==
The film received generally positive reviews. In 1973, Cassavetes was nominated for a Writers Guild of America Award for Best Comedy Written Directly for the Screen.

On the review aggregator website Rotten Tomatoes, the film holds an approval rating of 82% based on 17 reviews, with an average rating of 7.4/10. Metacritic, which uses a weighted average, assigned the film a score of 67 out of 100, based on 10 critics, indicating "generally favorable" reviews.

== In other media ==
The characters Big John and Little John spend Halloween night smoking marijuana and watching Minnie and Moskowitz in the 2021 horror film Halloween Kills.

== See also ==
- List of American films of 1971
