= Zoe Cassavetes =

American film director, screenwriter, and actress (born 1970)

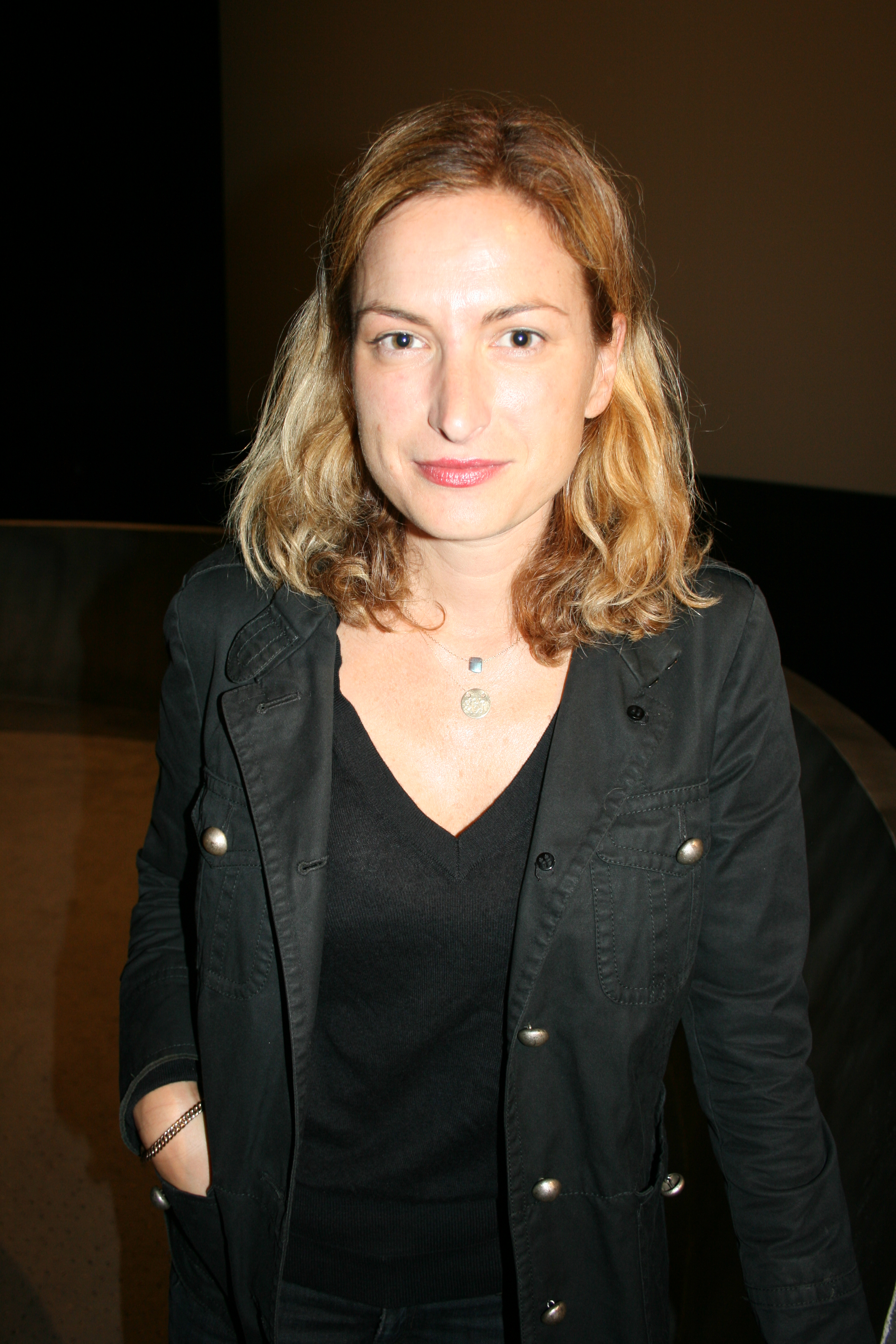
- Cassavetes in 2008
- Born: Zoe Rowlands Cassavetes; June 29, 1970 (age 56); Los Angeles, California, U.S.
- Occupations: Actress, film director, screenwriter
- Years active: 1991–present
- Spouse: Sebastien Chenut
- Parent(s): John Cassavetes; Gena Rowlands
- Family: Nick Cassavetes (brother); Alexandra Cassavetes (sister); Katherine Cassavetes (paternal grandmother); Lady Rowlands (maternal grandmother); Edwin Myrwyn Rowlands (maternal grandfather)

Zoe Rowlands Cassavetes (born June 29, 1970) is an American film director, screenwriter, and actress. The daughter of filmmaker John Cassavetes and actress Gena Rowlands, she is best known for her 2007 film Broken English. She is the sister of actor and director Nick Cassavetes.

== Education ==
Rowlands Cassavetes attended Campbell Hall, a private K-12 school in Los Angeles, graduating in 1988.

== Career ==
Cassavetes's first experience with the filmmaking business was at the age of one, when she had an uncredited role as a baby girl in her father John Cassavetes's film Minnie and Moskowitz, but it was not until 1991 that she had her first acting role in the film Ted & Venus. This was followed with minor roles in the films Noises Off and The Thing Called Love. In 1994, she and her filmmaking friend Sofia Coppola created and hosted the Comedy Central television series Hi Octane, a skit and variety show that featured guests including Keanu Reeves, Beastie Boys and Martin Scorsese. Hi Octane lasted for only one season but is remembered as one of the first series to be entirely shot in digital video.

Cassavetes's directorial debut was in 2000 on the Sundance Film Festival-featured short film Men Make Women Crazy Theory. She is best known as the director and writer of the 2007 romance-comedy film Broken English, which featured Parker Posey and her mother Gena Rowlands. Cassavetes's inspiration for Broken English came from her perception of other people's impression that happiness only comes from being in love with someone, saying: "I got caught up and swept up in the whole idea that I didn't have any worth until I found that person ... So I just wanted to make a nice, little portrait about what happens to someone when they get caught up in all of that." She was nominated for the 2008 Independent Spirit Award for Best First Screenplay but lost to Diablo Cody for Juno.

In 2012, she was invited to participate in Miu Miu's ad campaign The Women's Tales. The short she created for the project, The Powder Room, premiered at the 69th Venice International Film Festival.

Her second feature film, Day Out of Days, stars Alexia Landeau as a 40-year-old actress struggling to stay afloat in Hollywood. The supporting cast includes Melanie Griffith, Eddie Izzard, Cheyenne Jackson, Vincent Kartheiser, Alessandro Nivola, Brooke Smith and Bellamy Young.

== Personal life ==
Cassavetes comes from a family of filmmakers: her father John Cassavetes an actor, screenwriter and director; her mother Gena Rowlands an actress; her brother Nick Cassavetes an actor and director; her sister Alexandra Cassavetes an actress and director; and her grandmother Katherine Cassavetes an actress. She says that the relationship problems the main character encounters in Broken English are mostly autobiographical, saying: "I'm obsessed with the idea of love on many different levels – love through family, love your friends, love yourself and who you give that love to, who you can take it from." She has been called a muse to fashion designer Marc Jacobs along with actress and director Sofia Coppola. She is married to Sebastien Chenut.

== Filmography ==
=== Feature films ===
- Broken English (2007)
- Day Out of Days (2015)

=== Short films ===
- Men Make Women Crazy Theory (2000)
- The Powder Room (2012)
