= Katherine Cassavetes =

American actress

- Born: Katherine Demetriou; June 24, 1906; New York City, New York
- Died: March 29, 1983 (aged 76); Los Angeles, California
- Occupation: Actress
- Spouse: Nicholas Cassavetes
- Children: John Cassavetes
- Relatives: Nick Cassavetes (grandson); Alexandra Cassavetes (granddaughter); Zoe Cassavetes (granddaughter)

Katherine Cassavetes (Greek: Κατερίνα Κασσαβέτης; née Demetriou; June 24, 1906 – March 29, 1983) was an American actress of Greek origin. She was the mother of actor-director John Cassavetes and mother-in-law of actress Gena Rowlands. Her grandchildren are actor-directors Nick Cassavetes, Zoe Cassavetes, and Alexandra Cassavetes.

== Biography ==
Cassavetes was born in New York City, She appeared in four films, three of which were written and directed by her son, including Minnie and Moskowitz (1971).

== Partial filmography ==
- Minnie and Moskowitz (1971) - Sheba Moskowitz
- The Teacher (1974) - Gossiping Lady 1
- A Woman Under the Influence (1974) - Margaret Longhetti
- Opening Night (1977) - Vivian (final film role)
