= Alexandra Cassavetes =

American actress and director

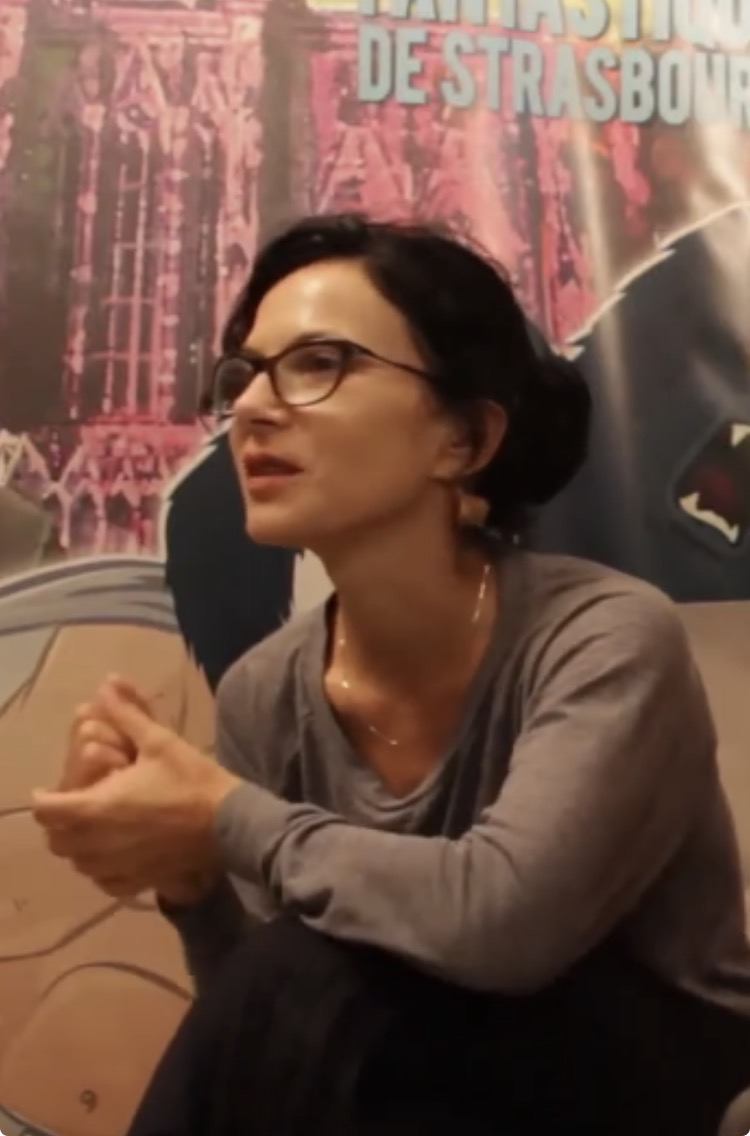
- Cassavetes in 2015
- Born: September 21, 1965 (age 60); Los Angeles, California, U.S.
- Occupations: Actress, director
- Spouse: Rick Ross
- Children: 2
- Parent(s): John Cassavetes; Gena Rowlands
- Family: Nick Cassavetes (brother); Zoe Cassavetes (sister); Katherine Cassavetes (paternal grandmother); Lady Rowlands (maternal grandmother); Edwin Myrwyn Rowlands (maternal grandfather)

Alexandra "Xan" Cassavetes (born 21 September 1965) is an American actress and director. She is the daughter of Greek-American actor-director John Cassavetes and actress Gena Rowlands. She is the granddaughter of actress Katherine Cassavetes. She is the sister of actor-director Nick Cassavetes and actor-screenwriter-director Zoe Cassavetes.

Cassavetes was a vocalist in the 1990s alternative metal band Shrine. She later directed the 2004 documentary Z Channel: A Magnificent Obsession, which explores the historic influence of the cable television station Z Channel. The film won acclaim, and screened out of competition at the Cannes Film Festival. In 2012, Cassavetes wrote and directed her first dramatic feature, the vampire tale Kiss of the Damned.

== Filmography ==
Actress

Year	Title	Role	Notes
1970	Husbands	Xan	Uncredited
1971	Minnie and Moskowitz	Young Girl in Ballet Tutu	Uncredited
1974	A Woman Under the Influence	Adrienne Jensen	
1984	Love Streams	Backup Singer	
2000	Dust	Vivian	Short film
2006	Alpha Dog	Jonna Kirshner	Also second unit director

Writer and director

Year	Title	Role	Notes
2000	Dust	Writer, director	Short film
2004	Z Channel: A Magnificent Obsession	Director	Documentary
2008	New York, I Love You	Writer	Segment: "Allen Hughes"
2012	Kiss of the Damned	Writer, director	
