= Kiss of the Damned =

- Theatrical release poster by Akiko Stehrenberger
- Directed by: Alexandra Cassavetes
- Written by: Alexandra Cassavetes
- Produced by: Jen Gatien; Alex Orlovsky
- Starring: Joséphine de La Baume; Milo Ventimiglia; Roxane Mesquida; Michael Rapaport; Riley Keough; Anna Mouglalis
- Cinematography: Tobias Datum
- Edited by: Taylor Gianotas; John F. Lyons
- Music by: Steven Hufsteter
- Production companies: Deerjen Films; Verisimilitude; Bersin Pictures; Venture Forth
- Distributed by: Magnet Releasing
- Release dates: September 7, 2012 (Venice); May 3, 2013 (United States)
- Running time: 97 minutes
- Country: United States
- Language: English
- Box office: $14,752

Kiss of the Damned is a 2012 American vampire horror film written and directed by Alexandra Cassavetes in her feature directorial debut. Starring Joséphine de La Baume, Milo Ventimiglia, Roxane Mesquida, Michael Rapaport, Riley Keough, and Anna Mouglalis, the film follows a man who falls in love with a vampire, but their relationship is threatened by the arrival of her estranged troublemaking sister.

Kiss of the Damned premiered at the Venice International Film Festival on September 7, 2012, where it was nominated for the Queer Lion. The film was theatrically released in the United States on May 3, 2013, to positive reviews from critics.

== Plot ==
Paolo, a screenwriter staying in Connecticut to write a screenplay, meets and falls in love with Djuna, only to discover that she is a vampire who survives by consuming the blood of animals. Djuna confesses to Paolo, but he refuses to believe her, so she asks him to chain her to the bed so she can prove it to him. Revealed in her true form, Paolo is unafraid and releases her from the chains and they have sex. As the two reach climax, Paolo receives Djuna's "kiss of death" and is turned into a vampire. The two continue to live in Djuna's large summer house which is actually owned by Xenia, a leader in the vampire community and theatre actress. It is a halfway house for vampires in Xenia's community.

Their life as a couple is disturbed by the arrival of Mimi, Djuna's out of control sister, who has come to live at the house after she killed a man in Amsterdam. Mimi claims she only plans on staying a week and proceeds to cause chaos in their lives. She feeds on human after human, which is forbidden in their community, seduces Paolo, and offers Xenia a virgin, Anne, who is a fan of Xenia's theatre work. Meanwhile, the housekeeper Irene, whose family have been the caretakers of the summer house for generations, suffers from a hereditary blood disorder that makes her blood undesirable to vampires. She overhears Djuna telling Xenia that Mimi has been attacking humans, although Xenia tries to deny it.

As dawn approaches, Mimi drives back to the house. Looking away from the road momentarily, a deer enters the roadway and Mimi swerves to avoid it, loses control and crashes badly. The sun is rising when Mimi regains consciousness still strapped upside down in the vehicle. With the sun now up, but obscured behind heavy clouds Mimi limps and crawls toward the house, only to fall short within sight, but already burning from the sun's rays. Irene pulls into the driveway and stops beside Mimi. Mimi begs her for help but Irene ignores her plea and instead lights a cigarette. Paolo and Djuna are preparing to leave the summer house as Paolo states how they're set to go stay with their friends in Italy. As they leave the house, a half-filled black trash bag near the stairway, stirs and tips over by itself. Djuna, Paolo, and Irene look back at it, dismiss it, and continue on their way.

== Cast ==
- Josephine de La Baume as Djuna
  - Olivia Lauletta as Young Djuna
- Milo Ventimiglia as Paolo
- Roxane Mesquida as Mimi
  - Tiarnie Coupland as Young Mimi
- Anna Mouglalis as Xenia
- Michael Rapaport as Ben
- Peter Vack as Adam
- Riley Keough as Anne
- Ching Valdes-Aran as Irene Pola

== Production ==
The majority of the film was shot in New Fairfield, Connecticut.

== Reception ==
=== Critical response ===
On Rotten Tomatoes it has a score of 68% based on 34 reviews. The site's consensus reads: "This one bites in a mostly good way: Kiss of the Damned is an erotic gorefest reminiscent of gaudy 70's horror flicks, presented in plain packaging and not meant for direct sunlight".

It is most often referred to as inspired by the Gothic vampire movies of the 1970s.

=== Accolades ===
In September 2013, the film won the Octopus d’Or for the best international feature film at the Strasbourg European Fantastic Film Festival.

== See also ==
- Vampire film
