= Fort McCoy (film) =

- Film poster
- Directed by: Kate Connor; Michael Worth
- Written by: Kate Connor
- Produced by: Kate Connor; Eric Stoltz
- Starring: Eric Stoltz; Kate Connor; Lyndsy Fonseca; Andy Hirsch; Camryn Manheim; Seymour Cassel; Brendan Fehr; Rene Heger
- Cinematography: Neil Lisk
- Edited by: Robert Brakey
- Music by: Dana Niu
- Production company: Marzipan Entertainment
- Distributed by: Monterey Media
- Release date: May 5, 2011 (Newport Beach Intl. Film Festival)
- Country: United States
- Language: English
- Box office: $12,303

Fort McCoy is a 2011 American drama film written by Kate Connor, produced by Connor and Eric Stoltz, and directed by Connor and Michael Worth that stars Stoltz, Connor, Lyndsy Fonseca, Andy Hirsch, Camryn Manheim, Seymour Cassel, and Brendan Fehr.

The film depicts the life of a barber who is hired by the United States Army. His services are needed for a prisoner-of-war camp in Wisconsin.

== Plot ==
In 1944 Frank Stirn moves his family to Wisconsin to become a barber for the US Army and a prisoner-of-war camp it oversees at Fort McCoy. Bitter that he is unable to fight because he is 4F, Frank takes a stand when a Nazi officer threatens his wife.

== Production ==
The film was shot in California, and La Crosse, Wisconsin.

== Release ==
The film was first shown at Boston, Cannes Independent, Rhode Island, Savannah film festivals. The U.S. and Canadian rights were acquired by Monterey Media in March 2014.

=== Festivals ===
Fort McCoy was shown at the following festivals:

- Rhode Island International Film Festival
- Savannah Film Festival
- Hollywood Film Festival
- Cannes Independent Film Festival
- TriMedia Film Festival
- Worldfest Houston
- Milan Intl Film Festival
- Boston Film Festival
- Ft Lauderdale Intl Film Festival
- Stony Brook Film Festival
- Tacoma Film Festival
- St. Louis Film Festival
- Dublin Film Festival

== Reception ==
On the review aggregator website Rotten Tomatoes, 50% of 6 critics' reviews are positive, with an average rating of 5/10. Metacritic, which uses a weighted average, assigned the film a score of 47 out of 100, based on 6 critics, indicating "mixed or average" reviews.

== See also ==
- Independent film
- Film industry in Wisconsin
