= Nick Cassavetes =

American actor, director, and screenwriter (born 1959)

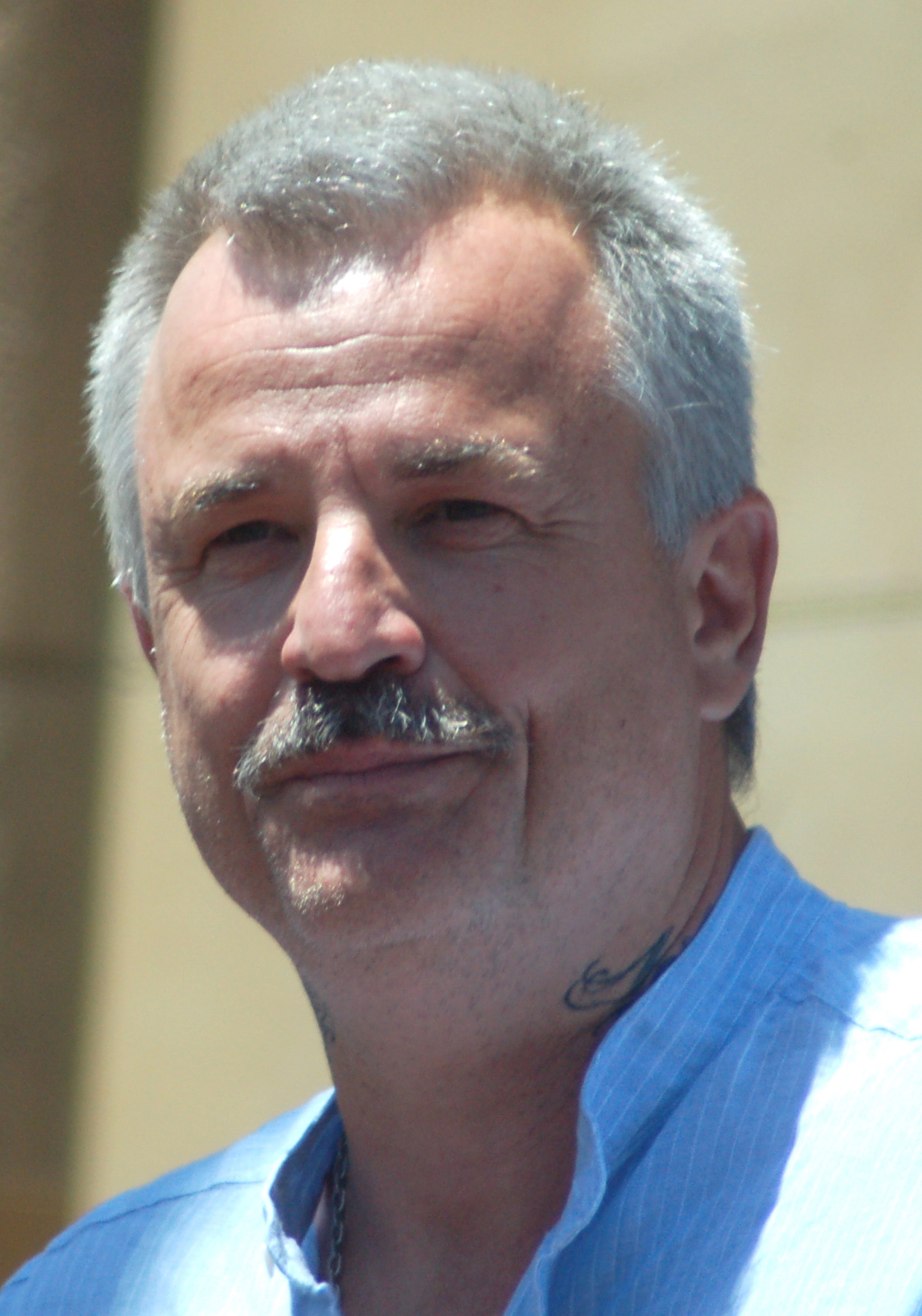
- Cassavetes in June 2009
- Born: Nicholas David Rowland Cassavetes; May 21, 1959 (age 67); New York City, U.S.
- Occupations: Actor; director; writer
- Years active: 1970–present
- Spouses: Isabelle Rafalovich (m. 1985, divorced) Heather Wahlquist (div. 2017)
- Children: 3
- Parents: John Cassavetes; Gena Rowlands
- Family: Alexandra Cassavetes (sister); Zoe Cassavetes (sister); Katherine Cassavetes (paternal grandmother); Lady Rowlands (maternal grandmother); Edwin Myrwyn Rowlands (maternal grandfather)

Nicholas David Rowland Cassavetes (born May 21, 1959) is an American actor, director, and writer. He has directed such films as She's So Lovely (1997), John Q. (2002), The Notebook (2004), Alpha Dog (2006), and My Sister's Keeper (2009). His acting credits include an uncredited role in Husbands (1970)—which was directed by his father, John Cassavetes—as well as roles in the films The Wraith (1986), Face/Off (1997), and Blow (2001).

== Early life and career ==
Cassavetes was born in New York City, the son of Greek-American actor and film director John Cassavetes and actress Gena Rowlands. As a child, he appeared in his father's film Husbands (1970). After spending so much of his youth surrounded by the film industry, Cassavetes initially decided he did not want to go into the field. He instead attended Syracuse University on a basketball scholarship, but after an injury effectively ended his athletic career, he decided to rethink his aspirations, ultimately deciding to attend his parents' alma mater, the American Academy of Dramatic Arts in New York.

He has appeared in the films Face/Off, The Wraith, Life, Class of 1999 II: The Substitute, Backstreet Dreams and The Astronaut's Wife, among others. He has directed several films, including John Q, Alpha Dog, She's So Lovely, Unhook the Stars, The Notebook, and My Sister's Keeper. He also adapted the screenplay for Blow and wrote the dialogue for the Justin Timberlake music video "What Goes Around... Comes Around".

Cassavetes finished in fifth place in the World Poker Tour Invitational Season 5, attempting a bluff. He also appeared on season 5 of The Game Show Network's High Stakes Poker.

He also has played himself in the season 7 opener of Entourage on HBO and Tattoo Joe as a cameo in The Hangover: Part II, replacing Liam Neeson from the cast due to scheduling conflicts.

== Personal life ==
In 1985, Cassavetes married Isabelle Rafalovich. They had two daughters together before divorcing. Their daughter Sasha was born with a heart defect and underwent substantial surgery; Cassavetes' film John Q. was dedicated to Sasha, and his later adaptation of My Sister's Keeper was based in part on Sasha's medical experience.

Cassavetes later married Heather "Queenie" Wahlquist, and they have a daughter together. Wahlquist has appeared in several of his films, including a small role in The Notebook as Sara, a secondary character and best friend to the female lead Allie Hamilton, portrayed by Rachel McAdams. Cassavetes' mother, Gena Rowlands, appears as the older, married Allie (Hamilton) Calhoun.

== Filmography ==
=== Actor ===
==== Film ====
Year	Film	Role	Notes
1970	Husbands	Nick	Uncredited
1985	Mask	T.J.	
1986	The Wraith	Packard Walsh	
1986	Black Moon Rising	Luis	
1986	Quiet Cool	Valence	
1988	Under the Gun	Tony Braxton	
1988	Assault of the Killer Bimbos	Wayne-O	
1989	Blind Fury	Lyle Pike	
1990	Backstreet Dreams	Mikey	
1991	Delta Force 3: The Killing Game	Charlie	Direct-to-DVD
1992	Twogether	Wolfgang Amadeus "John" Madler	
1993	Sins of Desire	Barry Mitchum	
1993	Sins of the Night	Jack Neitsche	
1993	Broken Trust	Alan Brogan	
1994	Class of 1999 II: The Substitute	Emmett Grazer	
1994	Mrs. Parker and the Vicious Circle	Robert Sherwood	
1996	Black Rose of Harlem	Johnny	
1997	Face/Off	Dietrich Hassler	
1997	Farticus	Adonis Papadapadopounopoulopoulos	
1999	Life	Sergeant Dillard	
1999	The Astronaut's Wife	Capt. Alex Streck	
2001	Blow	Man in Derek's Salon	Uncredited
2011	The Hangover Part II	Tattoo Joe	
2013	Love and Skin	Uncle Nicky	Short film
2021	Prisoners of the Ghostland	Psycho	
2021	Queenpins	Captain Pain	

==== Television ====
Year	Film	Role	Notes
1980	Reunion	Steve Cowan	TV movie
1987	Matlock	Foley	Episode: "The Convict"
1987	L.A. Law	Richard Bertrand	Episode: "Sparky Brackman R.I.P. ????-1987"
1988	Shooter	Tex	TV movie
1989	Quantum Leap	Primo La Palma	Episode: "Double Identity - November 8, 1965"
1990	The Marshall Chronicles	Gus	Episode: "Do the Write Thing"
2010	Entourage	Nick Cassavetes	2 episodes
2017	Tales	Rodney King	Episode: "F*ck the Police"

=== Director and writer ===
Year	Title	Director	Writer	Notes
1996	Unhook the Stars	Yes	Yes	Directorial debut
1997	She's So Lovely	Yes	No	
2001	Blow	No	Yes	Co-writer with David McKenna; directed by Ted Demme
2002	John Q.	Yes	No	Also songwriter: "The Voice Inside My Heart"
2004	The Notebook	Yes	No	
2006	Alpha Dog	Yes	Yes	Also soundtrack producer and songwriter: "At The Site/Driving To The Site"
2009	My Sister's Keeper	Yes	Yes	Co-writer with Jeremy Leven
2012	Yellow	Yes	Yes	Co-writer with Heather Wahlquist
2014	The Other Woman	Yes	No	
2023	God Is a Bullet	Yes	Yes	
2025	Marked Men: Rule + Shaw	Yes	No	
