= Opening Night (1977 film) =

1977 film by John Cassavetes

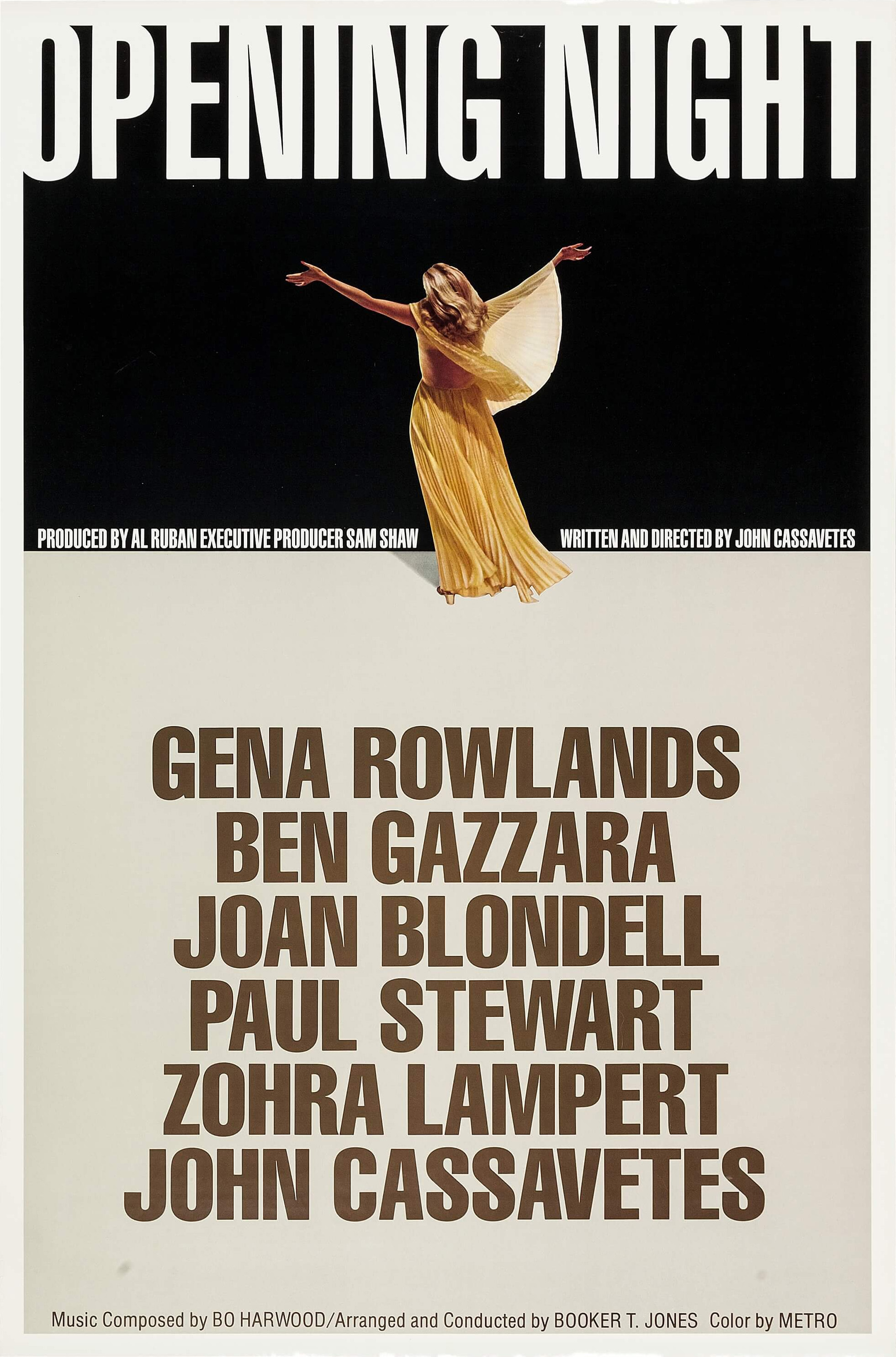
- Theatrical release poster
- Directed by: John Cassavetes
- Written by: John Cassavetes
- Produced by: Al Ruban
- Starring: Gena Rowlands; Ben Gazzara; Joan Blondell; Paul Stewart; Zohra Lampert; John Cassavetes
- Cinematography: Al Ruban
- Edited by: Tom Cornwell
- Music by: Bo Harwood
- Production company: Faces Distribution
- Distributed by: Faces Distribution
- Release date: December 25, 1977
- Running time: 144 minutes
- Country: United States
- Language: English

Opening Night is a 1977 American psychological drama film written and directed by John Cassavetes, and starring Gena Rowlands, Ben Gazzara, Joan Blondell, Paul Stewart, Zohra Lampert, and Cassavetes. Its plot follows a stage actress who, after witnessing the accidental death of a fan, struggles through a nervous breakdown while she prepares for an upcoming Broadway premiere.

Though set in Connecticut and New York City, Opening Night was shot on location in Los Angeles and Pasadena, California, with the theatrical performance sequences taking place at the Pasadena Civic Auditorium.

== Plot ==
In New Haven, Connecticut, Myrtle Gordon is a famous but troubled middle-aged actress performing out-of-town previews of a new play called The Second Woman before its Broadway run. While leaving the theatre after a performance, Myrtle signs autographs and encounters an obsessive teenage fan, Nancy, who runs after Myrtle into the street and is struck by a car. The incident unsettles Myrtle, who goes to the girl's shiva, though her family greets her coolly.

Myrtle struggles to connect with the character she is playing in The Second Woman, finding that she has no motivation beyond her age. Over the course of numerous performances, Myrtle departs from the play's script in myriad ways, including changing her lines, throwing props around the set, breaking the fourth wall, and collapsing on stage. This frustrates others involved in the play. The writer, Sarah Goode, attempts to force Myrtle into facing her age. Myrtle admits to her that she has been seeing the apparition of Nancy—the teenager killed in the car accident—which Myrtle believes is a projection of her youth.

Myrtle's state of mind continues to deteriorate, and she begins to drink heavily. She imagines Nancy attacking her, and later she throws herself against the walls of Sarah's hotel room, breaking her sunglasses and slashing her face. The incident disturbs Sarah, who expresses her wish to have Myrtle replaced in the play, feeling she is psychologically unable to perform. After storming out of a rehearsal, Myrtle visits Sarah's spiritual medium for help and has another violent encounter with her vision of Nancy, this time fighting back and "killing" Nancy's ghost. Myrtle attempts to seduce Maurice Aarons—her leading man and a former lover—but he refuses.

Myrtle fails to show up on time for her call on opening night. When she finally arrives, Myrtle is so drunk that she can barely stand. With the audience growing restless, director Manny Victor demands the show go on. Myrtle struggles through the show's opening scenes, collapsing before her entrance and again on stage. As the show continues, Myrtle finds something of a rhythm. By the end, she and Maurice go off script and improvise the play's final act, to the producers' chagrin and the audience's rapturous applause.

== Cast ==
- Gena Rowlands as Myrtle Gordon
- Ben Gazzara as Manny Victor
- Joan Blondell as Sarah Goode
- Paul Stewart as David Samuels
- Zohra Lampert as Dorothy Victor
- John Cassavetes as Maurice Aarons
- John Tuell as Gus Simmons
- Laura Johnson as Nancy Stein
- Lady Rowlands as Melva Drake
- John Finnegan as Bobby
- Fred Draper as Leo
- Katherine Cassavetes as Vivian
- Patrick Labyorteaux as Child Actor Playing Vito (Uncredited)
- Louise Lewis (credited as Louise Fitch) as Kelly
- Carol Warren as Carla
- Ray Powers as Jimmy

Peter Falk, Seymour Cassell, and Peter Bogdanovich appear uncredited as themselves.

== Analysis ==
Writing in a 2018 retrospective for Esquire, critic Dom Nero describes Opening Night as a horror film or art horror film, writing: "In the way that its title sequence magnifies the mundane cheers of an audience into a violently furious sound, it takes our reality and presents the concurrent darkness within like the truth-driven horror films such as Get Out. In the way that it drapes Gena Rowlands in long, black, specter-like capes and collars—and the primal world around her colored in bright, bloody reds—it turns a funhouse mirror onto the crushing, almost satanic rituals of film acting and movie star culture like in Mulholland Drive. In the way that its haunting and minimalistic score is reminiscent of a John Carpenter theme, it makes a psychological break as foreboding as a masked bogeyman haunting suburban teenagers."

== Production ==
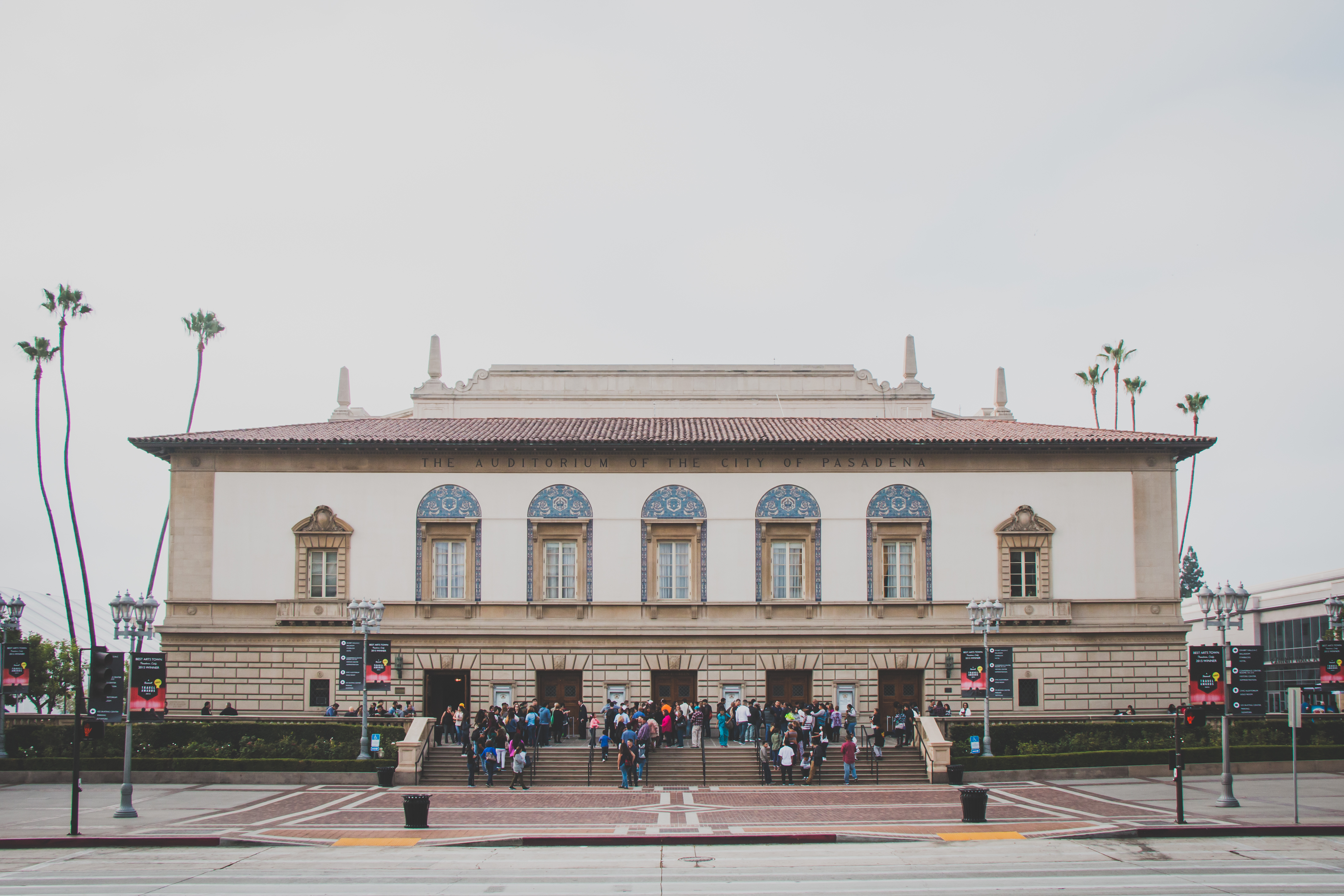
Filming took place primarily at the Pasadena Civic Auditorium

Though set in New Haven, Connecticut and New York City, Opening Night was shot on location in Los Angeles and Pasadena, California. The film's theater sequences were shot at the Pasadena Civic Auditorium.

== Release ==
In common with earlier films, Cassavetes struggled to get Opening Night distributed in the United States. After several preview screenings, it opened on December 25, 1977, at the Fox Wilshire Theater, Los Angeles, where it played to almost empty houses, and closed in February, having never been commercially shown elsewhere. Screenings in New York City that March were similarly ignored. The film was only picked up by an American distributor in 1991, two years after Cassavetes' death.

In 1978, it was entered into the 28th Berlin International Film Festival, where Gena Rowlands won the Silver Bear for Best Actress.

The film was screened at the New York Film Festival in 1988 and reviewed in The New York Times by Janet Maslin.

The film was screened out of competition at the 1992 Cannes Film Festival.

== Reception ==
Opening Night was critically panned in the U.S. on its release. The review in Variety that appeared after a press screening concluded, "One must question whether more than a handful of moviegoers are interested in the effort, whether audiences have not already seen enough of Cassavetes' characters ... He's made these films before and not many seemed interested in them." When it opened in New York, the film was not reviewed at all in most newspapers and magazines.

The film was better received in Europe, with the Hollywood Foreign Press Association nominating Rowlands and Blondell for the Best Actress and Best Supporting Actress, respectively, at the 35th Golden Globe Awards.

Its reputation has improved since its initial release. It currently holds a 96% "fresh" rating on Rotten Tomatoes from 27 reviews; the consensus states: "Opening Night is as dense and difficult as one would expect from John Cassavetes, but even the director's detractors will be unable to deny the power of Gena Rowlands' performance." Metacritic, which uses a weighted average, assigned the film a score of 69 out of 100, based on 15 critics, which the site labels as "generally favorable" reviews.

== In popular culture ==
Several musicians have referenced the film. Back to the Beat, an EP from the band Motion City Soundtrack, features a song titled "Opening Night", about the film. The Hold Steady's 2008 album Stay Positive makes various allusions to the film; the closing song "Slapped Actress" is the most explicit. "Shut Up"—the first track on Savages' 2013 album Silence Yourself—opens with dialogue between Rowlands and Blondell sampled from the film. Róisín Murphy's music video for "Exploitation", from the album Hairless Toys, serves as an homage to the movie. dEUS' song "Opening Night", from their album In A Bar, Under The Sea, is a tribute to the film that references Rowlands in the lyrics.

Jessica Pratt cited the film as an influence on her album Quiet Signs and titled the instrumental first track "Opening Night." Describing her reaction to the film after viewing it at a screening, she said, "Sometimes when you see a film, especially an emotional, anguishing film like that, it can just simmer in your subconscious for a while. It definitely did that for me."

Pedro Almodóvar repeats the film's accident scene in his film All About My Mother as the center of the dramatic conflict.

French stage director Cyril Teste adapted the screenplay into his play Opening Night in 2019, which starred Isabelle Adjani as Myrtle Gordon, Frédéric Pierrot as Maurice, and Morgan Lloyd Sicard as Manny.

Rufus Wainwright and Ivo van Hove adapted the film into a musical, which premiered at the Gielgud Theatre in London's West End in March 2024.

In the 2026 film Digger, director Alejandro González Iñárritu prominently placed a one-sheet movie poster for Opening Night in the backstage dressing room of stage performer Curtis Markson, played by Tom Cruise.
