= John Cassavetes =

American filmmaker and actor (1929–1989)

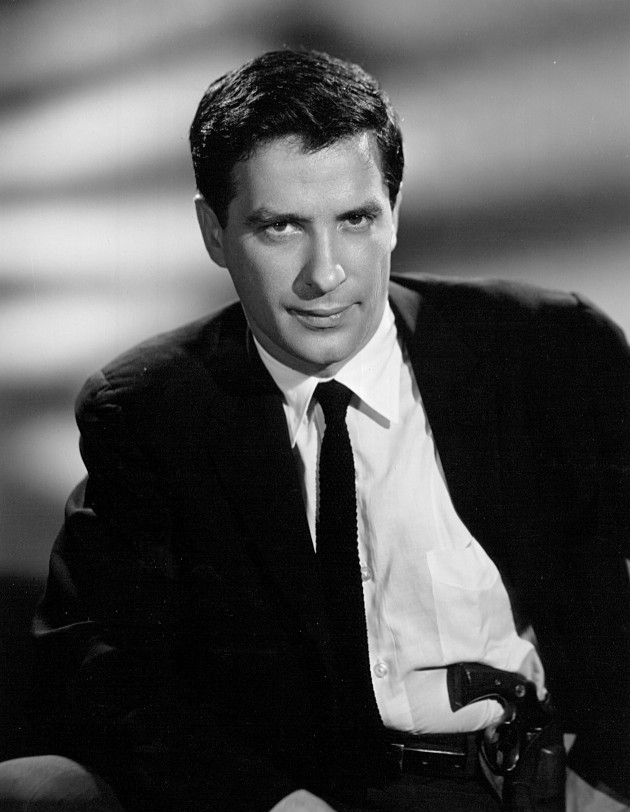
- Cassavetes as Johnny Staccato in 1959
- Born: John Nicholas Cassavetes; December 9, 1929; New York City, U.S.
- Died: February 3, 1989 (aged 59); Los Angeles, California, U.S.
- Resting place: Westwood Village Memorial Park Cemetery
- Occupations: Actor; film director; screenwriter; producer; editor
- Years active: 1951–1989
- Spouse: Gena Rowlands (m. 1954)
- Children: Nick; Alexandra; Zoe
- Mother: Katherine Cassavetes

John Nicholas Cassavetes (Note: /ˌkæsəˈvɛtiːz/ KASS-ə-VET-eez Greek: Γιάννης Νικόλαος Κασσαβέτης pronounced [ˈʝanis kasaˈvetis]) (December 9, 1929 – February 3, 1989) was a Greek-American filmmaker and actor. He began as an actor in film and television before helping to pioneer modern American independent cinema as a writer and director, often self-financing, producing, and distributing his own films. He received nominations for three Academy Awards, two BAFTA Awards, four Golden Globe Awards, and an Emmy Award.

After studying at the American Academy of Dramatic Arts, Cassavetes started his career in television acting in numerous network dramas. From 1959 to 1960 he played the title role in the NBC detective series Johnny Staccato. He acted in notable films, such as Martin Ritt's film noir Edge of the City (1957), Robert Aldrich's war film The Dirty Dozen (1967), Roman Polanski's horror film Rosemary's Baby (1968) and Elaine May's crime drama Mikey and Nicky (1976). For The Dirty Dozen, he earned a nomination for the Academy Award for Best Supporting Actor.

As a director, Cassavetes became known for a string of critically acclaimed independent dramas including Shadows (1959), Faces (1968), Husbands (1970), A Woman Under the Influence (1974), Opening Night (1977), and Love Streams (1984). His films employed an actor-centered approach which prioritized raw character relationships, "small feelings", and "messy anguish [that] sanctifies," while rejecting traditional Hollywood plotting, method acting, and stylization. His films became associated with an improvisational aesthetic and a cinéma vérité feel. (Note: Cassavetes' use of improvisation is often misunderstood; his films were almost entirely scripted, but he neglected to dictate his actors' deliveries, allowing them to develop their own interpretations of the lines. Additionally, he frequently rewrote scripts based on rehearsals and suggestions from his actors.) He received Academy Award nominations for Best Original Screenplay (Faces) and Best Director (A Woman Under the Influence). Shadows, Faces, and A Woman Under the Influence have been inducted into the National Film Registry.

He frequently collaborated with American actress Gena Rowlands, to whom he was married from 1954 until his death in 1989, and friends Peter Falk, Ben Gazzara, and Seymour Cassel. Many of his films were shot and edited in his and Rowlands' own Los Angeles home. He and Rowlands had a son, Nick, and two daughters, Alexandra and Zoe, all of whom followed them into acting and filmmaking.

== Early life and education ==
John Nicholas Cassavetes was born in New York City on December 9, 1929, the son of Greek-American actress Katherine Cassavetes (née Demetriou), who was later featured in some of his films, and Greek immigrant Nicholas John Cassavetes. His early years were spent with his family in Greece; when he returned to New York at the age of seven, he spoke no English. He was then raised on Long Island, where he attended Paul D. Schreiber Senior High School (then known as Port Washington High School) from 1945 to 1947 and participated in Port Weekly (the school paper), Red Domino (interclass play), football, and the Port Light (yearbook).

Cassavetes attended Blair Academy in New Jersey and spent a semester at Champlain College in Burlington, Vermont, but was expelled due to his failing grades. (Note: Cassavetes attended the Champlain College that began as a higher education facility for World War II veterans. It operated at the former Plattsburgh Barracks from 1946 to 1953, and closed when the U.S. military reclaimed the site for use as part of Plattsburgh Air Force Base. He did not attend the Champlain College that is located in Burlington.) He spent a few weeks hitchhiking to Florida and then transferred to the American Academy of Dramatic Arts, encouraged by recently enrolled friends who told him the school was "packed with girls". He graduated in 1950 and met his future wife Gena Rowlands at her audition to enter the academy in 1953. They were married four months later in 1954. He continued acting in the theater, took small parts in films, and began working on television in anthology series such as Alcoa Theatre.

== Career ==
=== Acting workshop ===
By 1956, Cassavetes had begun teaching an alternative to method acting in his own workshop—co-founded with friend Burt Lane in New York City—in which performance would be based on character creation rather than back-story or narrative requirements. Cassavetes particularly scorned Lee Strasberg's Method-based Actors Studio, and the Cassavetes-Lane approach held that acting should be an expression of creative joy rather than the "moody, broody anguish" associated with Strasberg's teaching.

Shortly after opening the workshop, Cassavetes was invited to audition at the Actors Studio, and he and Lane devised a prank: they claimed to be performing a scene from a recent stage production but in fact improvised a performance on the spot, fooling an impressed Strasberg. Cassavetes then fabricated a story about his financial troubles, prompting Strasberg to offer him a full scholarship to the Studio; Cassavetes immediately rejected it, feeling that Strasberg did not know anything about acting if he had been so easily fooled by the two ruses.

An improvisation exercise in the workshop inspired the idea for his writing and directorial debut, Shadows (1959; first version 1957). Cassavetes raised the funds for the production from friends and family, as well as listeners to Jean Shepherd's late-night radio talk-show Night People. His stated purpose was to make a film about modest-income "little people", unlike Hollywood studio productions, which focused on stories about wealthy people. The first version of Shadows was shown in November 1958 at New York's Paris Theater and praised by the avant-garde filmmaker Jonas Mekas. However, Cassavetes was so dissatisfied with the audience's response that he reshot and re-edited much of the film, and premiered the second version in November 1959 as part of Amos Vogel's Cinema 16 series. Cassavetes was unable to gain American distribution of Shadows, but it won the Critics Award at the Venice Film Festival. European distributors later released the movie in the United States as an import. Although the box-office returns of Shadows in the United States were slight, it did gain attention from the Hollywood studios.

=== Television and acting jobs ===
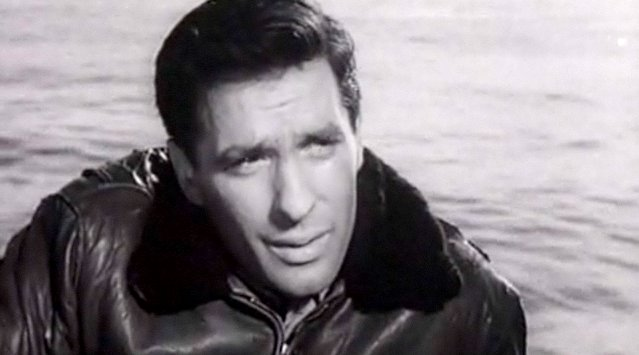
A still from the Edge of the City trailer

Cassavetes played bit-parts in B pictures and in television serials, until gaining notoriety in 1955 as a vicious killer in The Night Holds Terror, and as a juvenile delinquent in the live TV drama Crime in the Streets. Cassavetes would repeat this performance credited as an "introducing" lead in the 1956 film version, which also included another future director, Mark Rydell, as his gang mate. His first starring role in a feature film was Edge of the City (1957), which co-starred Sidney Poitier. He was briefly under contract to Metro-Goldwyn-Mayer and co-starred with Robert Taylor in the western Saddle the Wind, written by Rod Serling. In the late 1950s, Cassavetes guest-starred in Beverly Garland's groundbreaking crime drama, Decoy, about a New York City woman police undercover detective. Thereafter, he played Johnny Staccato, the title character in a television series about a jazz pianist who also worked as a private detective. In total he directed five episodes of the series, which also features a guest appearance by his wife Gena Rowlands. It was broadcast on NBC between September 1959 and March 1960, and then acquired by ABC; although critically acclaimed, the series was cancelled in September 1960. Cassavetes would appear on the NBC interview program, Here's Hollywood.

=== 1960s ===
In 1961 Cassavetes signed a seven-year deal with Paramount. Cassavetes directed two movies for Hollywood in the early 1960s: Too Late Blues (1961); A Child Is Waiting (1963) starring Burt Lancaster and Judy Garland. He starred in the CBS western series Rawhide in the episode Incident Near Gloomy River (1961). In the 1963–1964 season he was cast in the ABC medical drama about psychiatry, Breaking Point. In 1964, he again co-starred with his wife, this time in an episode of The Alfred Hitchcock Hour anthology program, and in 1965, he appeared on ABC's western series, The Legend of Jesse James. In the same year, he also guest-starred in the World War II series Combat!, in the episode "S.I.W.", and as the insane nuclear scientist Everett Lang in Voyage to the Bottom of the Sea, season 2, episode "The Peacemaker".

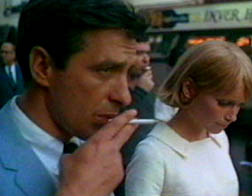
Cassavetes and Mia Farrow in Rosemary's Baby (1968)

With payment for his work on television, as well as a handful of film acting jobs, he was able to relocate to California and to make his subsequent films independent of any studio, as Shadows had been made. The films in which he acted with this intention include Don Siegel's The Killers (1964), the motorcycle gang movie Devil's Angels (1967), The Dirty Dozen (1967), for which he was nominated for an Academy Award for Best Supporting Actor, the Guy Woodhouse lead (originally intended for Robert Redford) in Roman Polanski's Rosemary's Baby (1968), and The Fury (1978). Cassavetes portrayed the murderer in a 1972 episode of the TV crime series Columbo, titled "Étude in Black". Cassavetes and series star Peter Falk had previously starred together in the 1969 mob action thriller Machine Gun McCain. The two later starred in Elaine May's film Mikey and Nicky (1976).

Faces (1968) was the second film to be both directed and independently financed by Cassavetes. The film starred his wife Gena Rowlands—whom he had married during his struggling actor days—John Marley, Seymour Cassel and Val Avery, as well as several first-time actors, such as lead actress Lynn Carlin and industry fringies like Vince Barbi. It depicts the slow disintegration of a contemporary marriage. The film reportedly took three years to make, and was made largely in the Cassavetes home. Faces was nominated for three Academy Awards: Best Original Screenplay, Best Supporting Actor, and Best Supporting Actress. Around this time, Cassavetes formed "Faces International" as a distribution company to handle all of his films.

=== 1970s ===
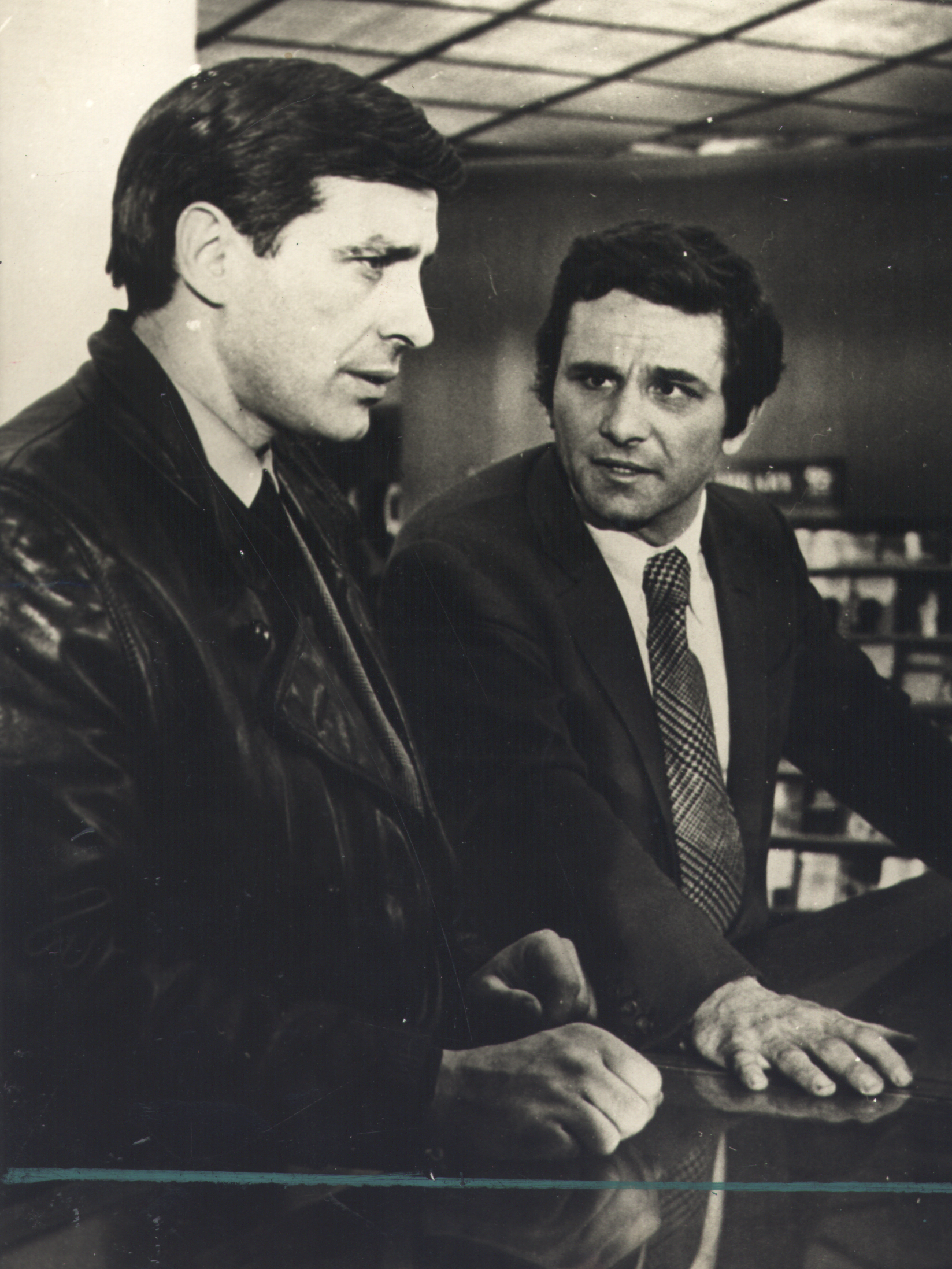
Cassavetes with Peter Falk in 1971

In 1970, Cassavetes directed and acted in Husbands, with actors Peter Falk and Ben Gazzara. They played a trio of married men on a spree in New York and London after the funeral of one of their best friends. Cassavetes stated that this was a personal film for him; his elder brother had died at the age of 30.

Minnie and Moskowitz (1971), about two unlikely lovers, featured Rowlands and Cassel. A Woman Under the Influence (1974) stars Rowlands as an increasingly troubled housewife. Rowlands received an Academy Award nomination for Best Actress, while Cassavetes was nominated for Best Director. In The Killing of a Chinese Bookie (1976), Gazzara plays a small-time strip-club owner with an out-of-control gambling habit, pressured by mobsters to commit a murder to pay off his debt.

In Opening Night (1977), Rowlands plays the lead alongside Cassavetes; the film also stars Gazzara and Joan Blondell. Rowlands portrays an aging film star named Myrtle Gordon, who is working in the theater and suffering a personal crisis. Alone and unloved by her colleagues, afraid of aging and always removed from others due to her stardom, she succumbs to alcohol and hallucinations after witnessing a young fan accidentally die. Ultimately, Gordon fights through it all, delivering the performance of her life in a play. Rowlands won the Silver Bear for Best Actress at the 28th Berlin International Film Festival for her performance.

=== 1980s ===
Cassavetes directed the film Gloria (1980), featuring Rowlands as a Mob moll who tries to protect an orphan boy whom the Mob wants to kill, which earned her another Best Actress nomination. In 1982, Cassavetes starred in Paul Mazursky's Tempest, which co-starred Rowlands, Susan Sarandon, Molly Ringwald, Raul Julia and Vittorio Gassman.

Cassavetes penned the stage play Knives, the earliest version of which he allowed to be published in the 1978 premiere issue of On Stage, the quarterly magazine of the American Community Theatre Association, a division of the American Theatre Association. The play was produced and directed as one of his Three Plays of Love and Hate at Hollywood, California's Center Theater in 1981. The trio of plays included versions of Canadian playwright Ted Allan's The Third Day Comes and Love Streams, the latter of which served as the blueprint for Cassavetes' 1984 film of the same name.

Cassavetes starred in Marvin & Tige (1983), also titled Like Father & Son, an American drama film directed by Eric Weston and written by Wanda Dell and Eric Weston based on a novel by Frankcina Glass. Marvin (played by Cassavetes), a heavy-drinking widower who has seen better days and makes a living taking odd jobs, meets suicidal youngster Tige (played by child actor Gibran Brown). Billy Dee Williams also appeared in the film in a supporting role.

Cassavetes made the Cannon Films-financed Love Streams (1984), which featured him as an aging playboy who suffers the overbearing affection of his recently divorced sister. It was entered into the 34th Berlin International Film Festival where it won the Golden Bear. The film is often considered Cassavetes' "last film" in that it brought together many aspects of his previous films. He despised the film Big Trouble (1986), which he took over during filming from Andrew Bergman, who wrote the original screenplay. Cassavetes came to refer to the film as "The aptly titled 'Big Trouble,'" since the studio vetoed many of his decisions for the film and eventually edited most of it in a way with which Cassavetes disagreed.

In January 1987, Cassavetes was facing health problems, but he wrote the three-act play Woman of Mystery and brought it to the stage in May and June at the Court Theatre, Los Angeles.

Cassavetes worked during the last year of his life to produce a last film that was to be titled She's Delovely. He was in talks with Sean Penn to star, though legal and financial hurdles proved insurmountable and the project was forgotten about until after Cassavetes' death, when his son Nick finally directed it as She's So Lovely (1997).

== Filmmaking style ==
Cassavetes spent the majority of his directing career working 'off the grid' and in a communal atmosphere "unfettered by the commercial concerns of Hollywood." His films aim to capture "small feelings" often repressed by Hollywood filmmaking, emphasizing intimate character examination and relationships rather than plot, backstory, or stylization. He often presented difficult characters whose behaviors were not easily understood, rejecting simplistic psychological or narrative explanations for their actions. Cassavetes also disregarded the "impressionistic cinematography, linear editing, and star-centred scene making" fashionable in Hollywood and art films. Often unable to interest Hollywood studios in financing his work, Cassavetes typically worked with small but dedicated crew of friends and technicians. He said: "The hardest thing for a film-maker, or a person like me, is to find people … who really want to do something."

Cassavetes worked to create a comfortable and informal environment where actors could freely experiment with their performances and go beyond acting clichés or "programmed behaviors." He dismissed Method acting as "more a form of psychotherapy than of acting" which resulted in sentimental cliches and self-indulgent emotion. Instead, he held that acting should be an expression of creative joy and exuberance, with emphasis put on the character's creation of "masks" in the process of interacting with other people. Cassavetes also said that he strove "to put [actors] in a position where they may make asses of themselves without feeling they're revealing things that will eventually be used against them." He frequently filmed scenes in long, uninterrupted takes, explaining that:

The drama of the scenes comes naturally from the real passage of time lived by the actors [...] The camera isn't content to just follow the characters' words and actions. I focus in on specific gestures and mannerisms. It's from focusing on these little things—the moods, silences, pauses, or anxious moments—that the form arises.

Cassavetes also rejected the dominance of the director's singular vision, instead believing each character must be the actor's "individual creation" and refusing to explain the characters to his actors in any significant detail. He claimed that "stylistic unity drains the humanity out of a text [...] The stories of many different and potentially inarticulate people are more interesting than a contrived narrative that exists only in one articulate man's imagination." The manner in which Cassavetes employed improvisation is frequently misunderstood: with the exception of the original version of Shadows, his films were tightly scripted. However, he allowed actors to interpret characters in their own way, and often rewrote scripts based on the results of rehearsals and performances. He explained that "I believe in improvising on the basis of the written word and not on undisciplined creativity."

Cassavetes worked with jazz musicians Charles Mingus and Shafi Hadi to provide the score for Shadows. Mingus' friend, Diane Dorr-Dorynek, described Cassavetes' approach to film-making in jazz terms:

The script formed the skeleton around which the actors might change or ad lib lines according to their response to the situation at the moment, so that each performance was slightly different. A jazz musician works in this way, using a given musical skeleton and creating out of it, building a musical whole related to a particular moment by listening to and interacting with his fellow musicians. Jazz musicians working with actors could conceivably provide audiences with some of the most moving and alive theater they have ever experienced.

When asked by André S. Labarthe during the making of Faces whether he had the desire to make a musical film, Cassavetes responded he wanted to make only one musical, Dostoevsky's Crime and Punishment. Cassavetes was passionate about a wide range of music, from jazz to classical to rock, saying "I like all music. It makes you feel like living. Silence is death."

Cassavetes worked with composer Bo Harwood from 1970 to 1984 on six films in several different capacities, even though Harwood had initially only signed on to do "a little editing" for Husbands, and "a little sound editing" for Minnie and Moskowitz. Harwood composed poignant music for Cassavetes' following three films, and was also credited as "Sound" for two of them. During these projects Harwood wrote several songs, some with Cassavetes contributing lyrics and rudimentary tunes. During his work with Cassavetes, Harwood claimed the notoriously unpredictable director preferred to use the "scratch track" version of his compositions, rather than to let Harwood refine and re-record them with an orchestra. Some of these scratch tracks were recorded in Cassavetes' office, with piano or guitar, as demos, and then eventually ended up in the final film. While this matched the raw, unpolished feel that marks most of Cassavetes' films, Harwood was sometimes surprised and embarrassed.

The relationship between Harwood and Cassavetes ended amicably. When asked by documentarian Michael Ventura during the making of Cassavetes' last film Love Streams, what he had learned from working with Cassavetes, Harwood replied:

I learned a lot through John. I've done a lot of editing for him. Picture editing, sound editing, music editing, shot sound, composed score, and I've learned a lot about integrity ... I think you know what I mean. You know, thirty years from now, I can say I rode with Billy the Kid.

== Personal life ==
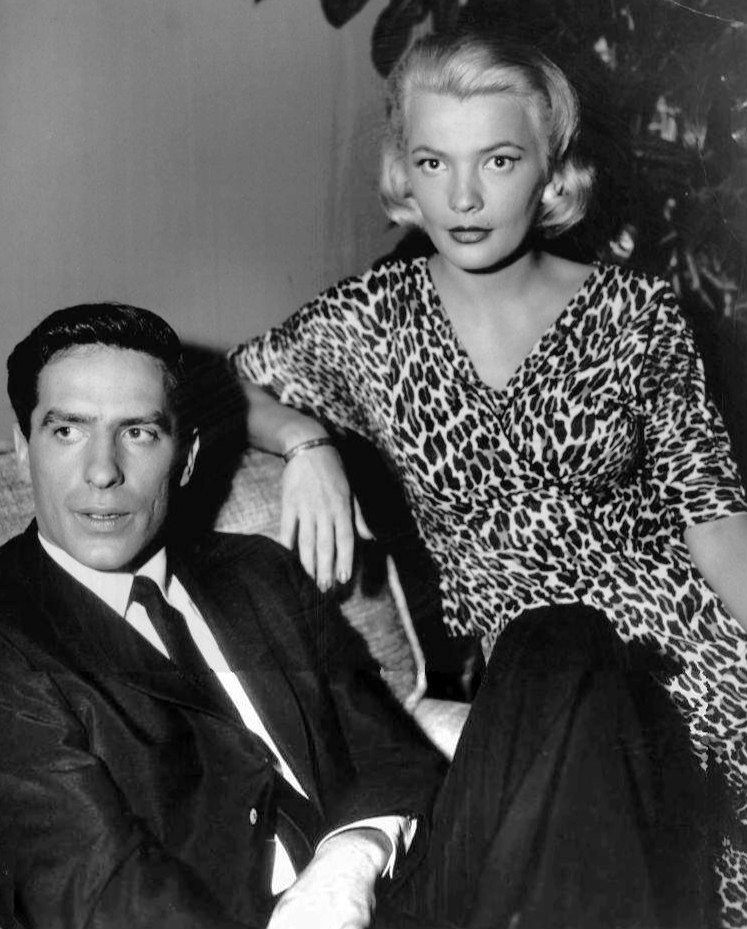
Cassavetes with his wife, actress Gena Rowlands, in 1959

=== Marriage ===
Cassavetes was married to American actress Gena Rowlands from 1954 until his death in 1989. Many of his films were shot and edited in his and Rowlands' own Los Angeles home. He and Rowlands had a son named Nick and two daughters named Alexandra and Zoe, all of whom followed them into acting and filmmaking.

=== Death ===
A long-time alcoholic, Cassavetes died in Los Angeles from complications of cirrhosis at the age of 59 on February 3, 1989. He is interred at Westwood Village Memorial Park cemetery in Los Angeles.

At the time of his death, Cassavetes had amassed a collection of more than 40 unproduced screenplays, as well as a novel, Husbands. He also left three unproduced plays: Sweet Talk, Entrances and Exits, and Begin the Beguine, the last of which, in German translation, was co-produced by Needcompany of Belgium and Burgtheater of Vienna, and premiered on stage at Vienna's Akademietheater in 2014.

== Legacy and reception ==
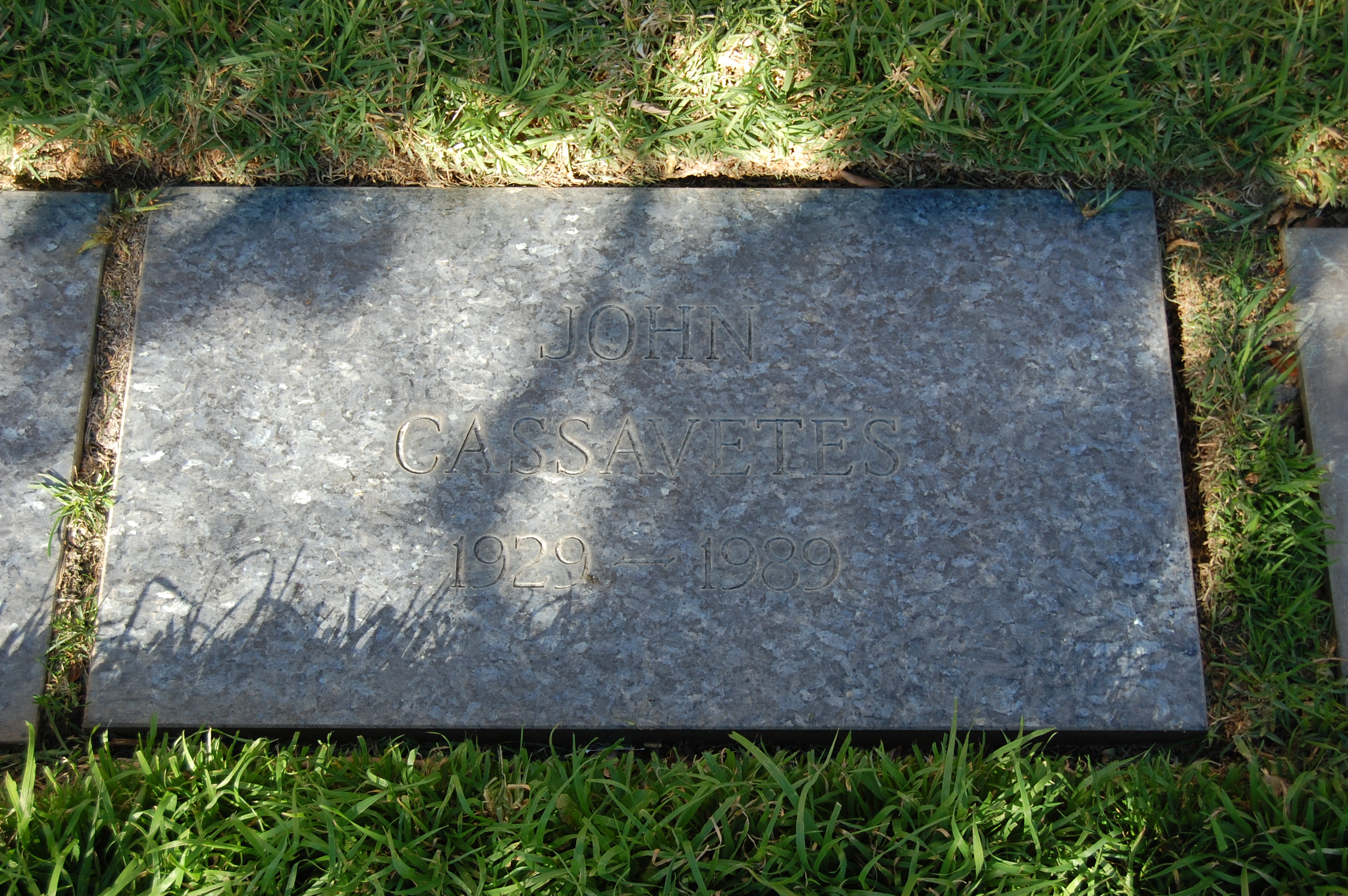
Cassavetes' grave

Cassavetes is the subject of several biographies. Cassavetes on Cassavetes is a collection of interviews collected or conducted by Boston University film scholar Ray Carney, in which the filmmaker recalled his experiences, influences, and outlook on the film industry. In the 2005 Hollywood issue of Vanity Fair, one article features a tribute to Cassavetes by three members of his stock company, Rowlands, Gazzara, and Falk.

Many of Cassavetes' films are owned by Faces Distribution, a company overseen by Gena Rowlands and Julian Schlossberg, distributed by Jumer Films (Schlossberg's own company), with additional sales and distribution by Janus Films. In September 2004, The Criterion Collection produced a Region 1 DVD box set of his five independent films: Shadows, Faces, A Woman Under the Influence, The Killing of a Chinese Bookie and Opening Night. Also featured in the set is a documentary about the life and works of Cassavetes, A Constant Forge, a booklet featuring critical assessments of the director's work and tributes by old friends. Criterion released a Blu-ray version of the set in October 2013. In 2005, a box set of the same films was released in Region 2 by Optimum Releasing. The Optimum DVD of Shadows has a voice-over commentary by Seymour Cassel. Then, in 2014, the Faces/Jumer library became the property of Shout! Factory, which acquired the films' holding parent company, Westchester Films.

Cassavetes' son Nick followed in his father's footsteps as an actor and director, adapting the She's Delovely screenplay his father had written into the 1997 film She's So Lovely, which starred Sean Penn, as John Cassavetes had wanted. Alexandra Cassavetes directed the documentary Z Channel: A Magnificent Obsession in 2004, and in 2006 served as 2nd Unit Director on her brother Nick's film, Alpha Dog. Cassavetes' younger daughter Zoe wrote and directed the 2007 film Broken English, featuring Rowlands and Parker Posey.

The New Yorker wrote that Cassavetes "may be the most influential American director of the last half century"—this in announcing that all the films he directed, plus others he acted in, were being screened in a retrospective tribute at the Brooklyn Academy of Music throughout July 2013. AllMovie called Cassavetes "an iconoclastic maverick".

The Independent Spirit Awards named one of their categories after Cassavetes, the Independent Spirit John Cassavetes Award. A one-person show about John Cassavetes titled Independent premiered at Essential Theatre in Atlanta in August 2017. The play was written by John D. Babcock III and starred actor Dan Triandiflou as Cassavetes. The song "What's Yr Take on Cassavetes?" by the band Le Tigre is about misogynistic themes within John Cassavetes' films and whether they can still be praised after those themes are identified. The song "Cassavetes" by the band Fugazi parallels John Cassavetes' independence from the film industry with the band's own independence from the record industry. In concert, singer Guy Picciotto introduced it as "a song about making your own road."

== Filmography ==
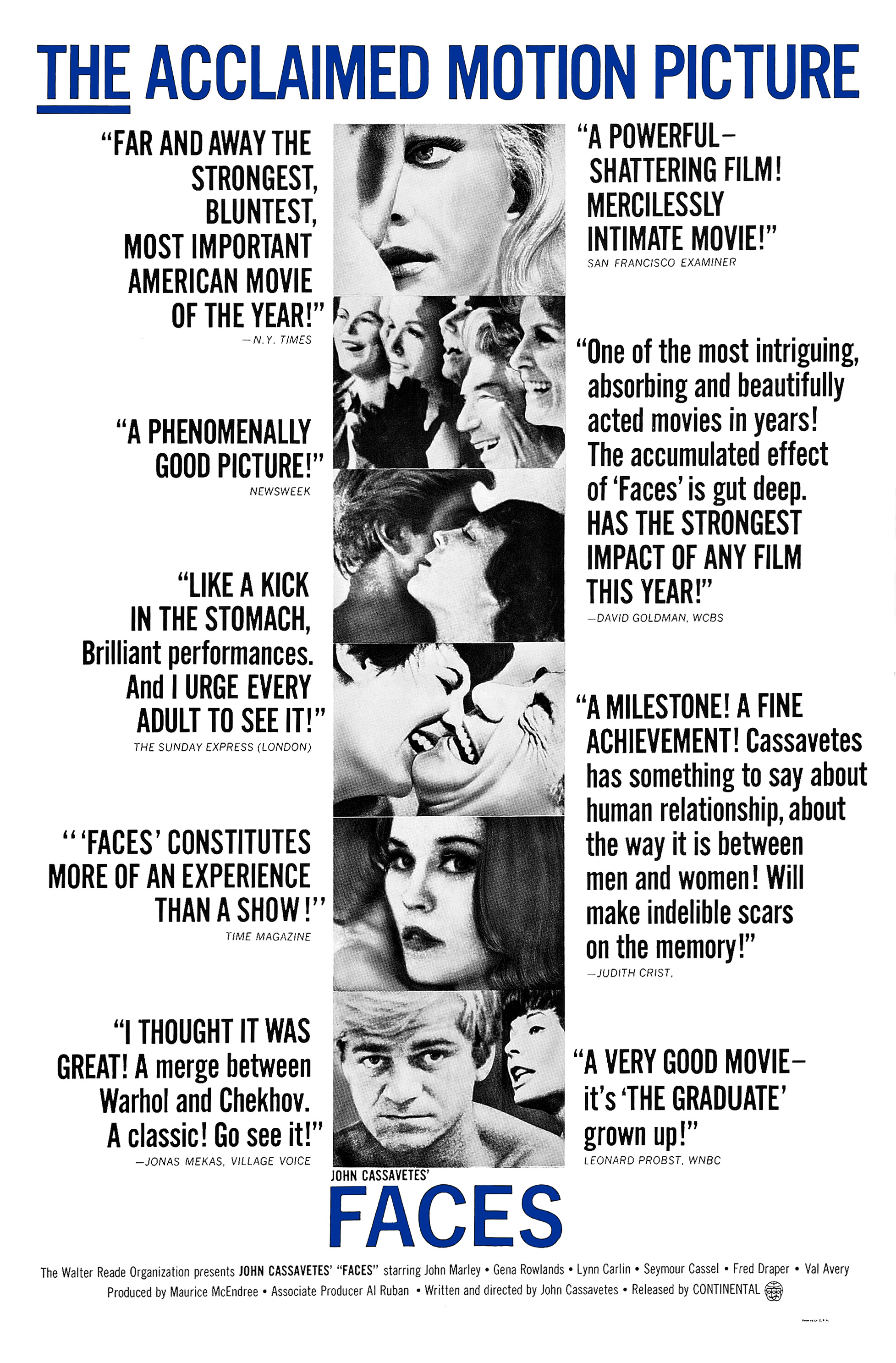
Faces (1968)

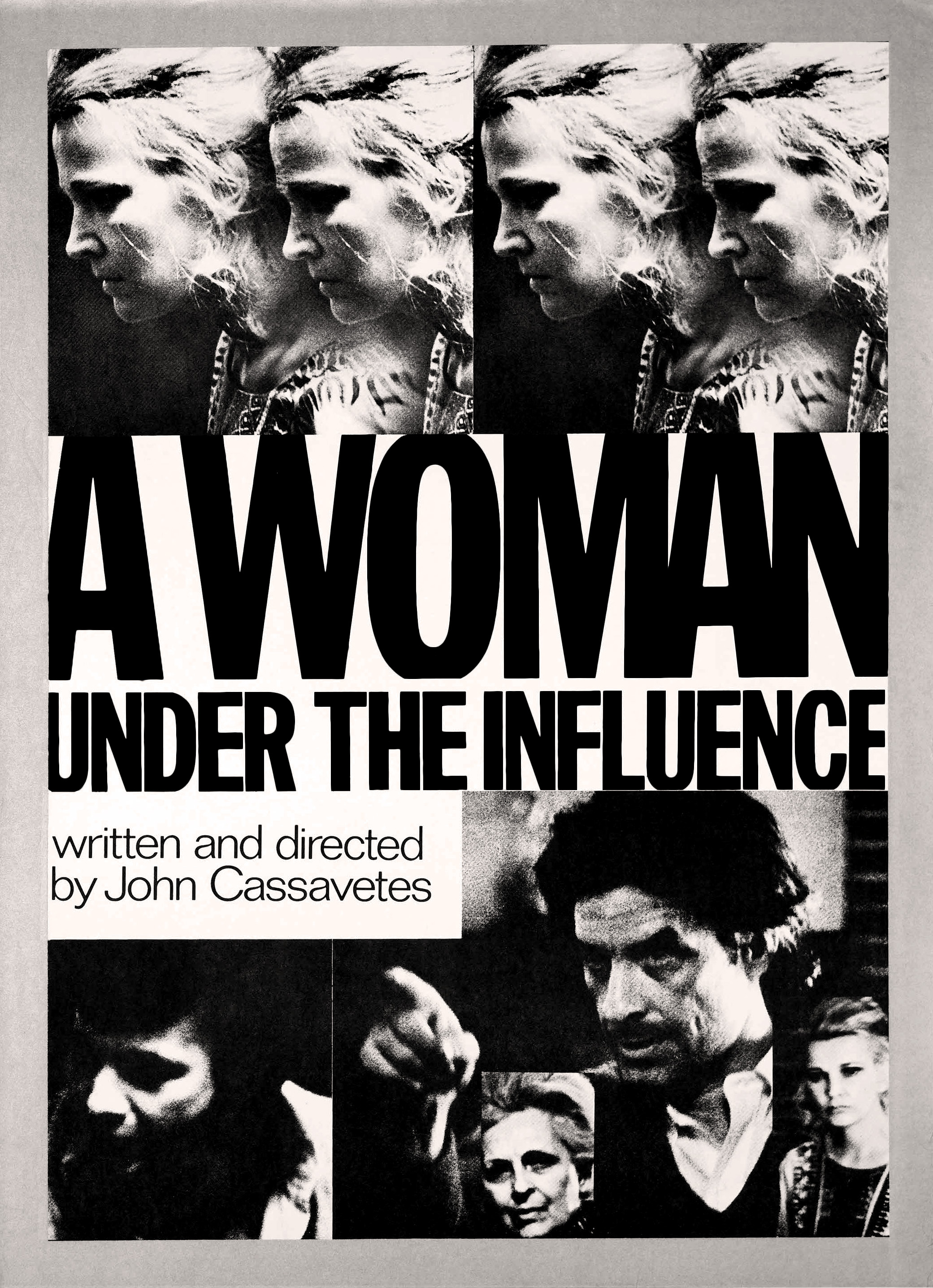
A Woman Under the Influence (1974)

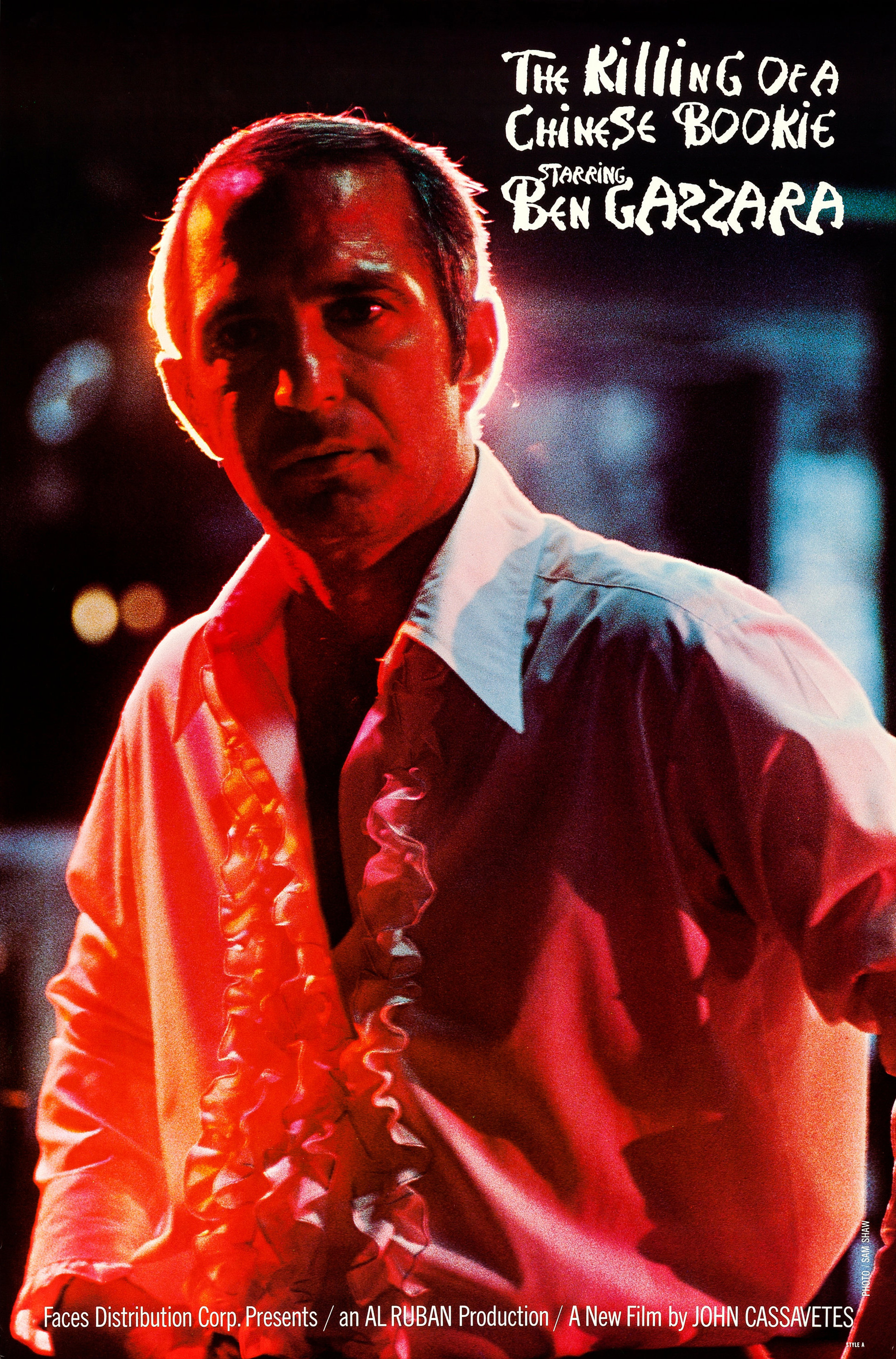
The Killing of a Chinese Bookie (1976)

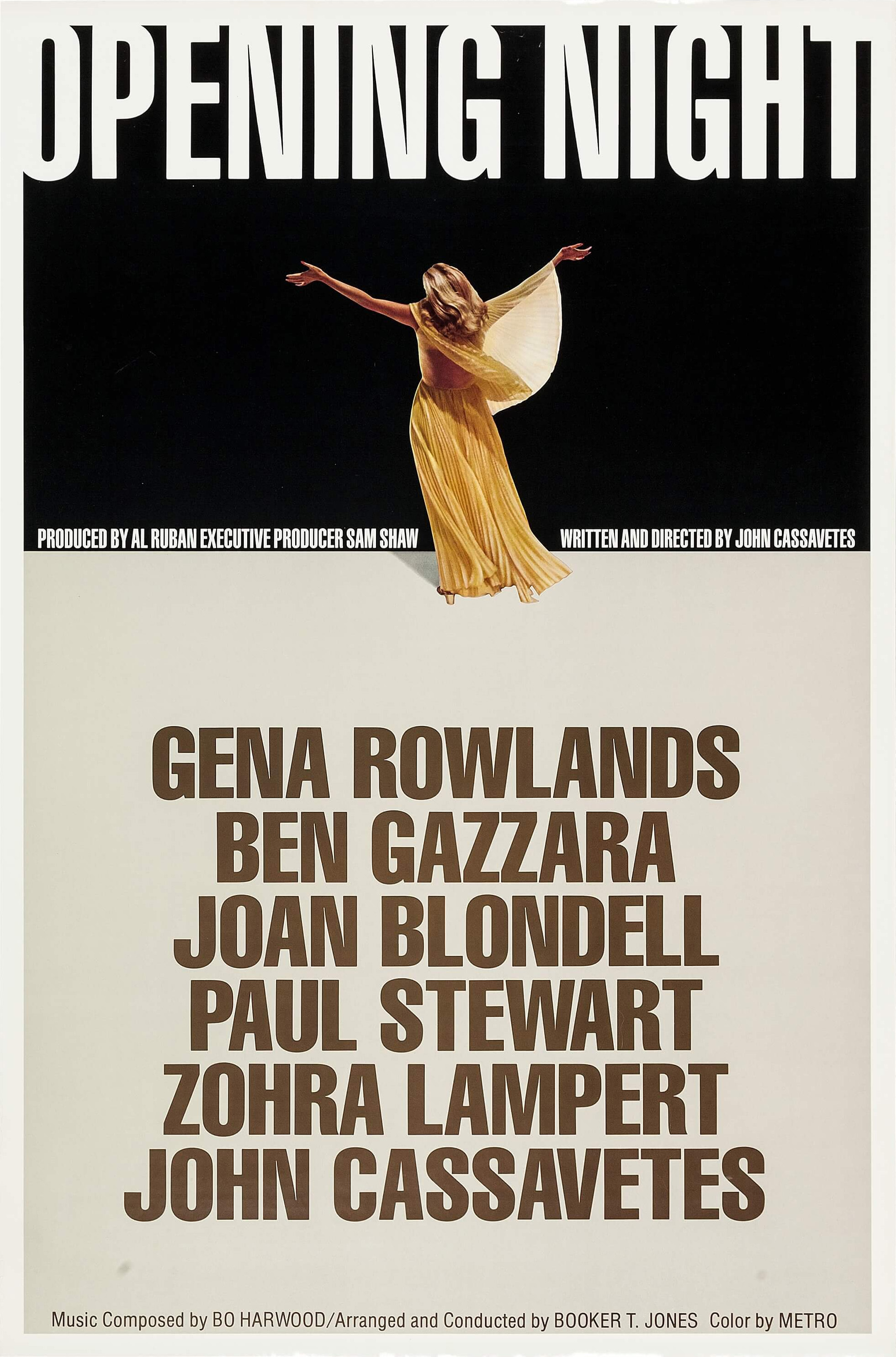
Opening Night (1977)

Directed features

Year	Title	Distributor
1959	Shadows	British Lion Films
1961	Too Late Blues	Paramount Pictures
1963	A Child Is Waiting	United Artists
1968	Faces	Continental Distributing
1970	Husbands	Columbia Pictures
1971	Minnie and Moskowitz	Universal Pictures
1974	A Woman Under the Influence	Faces Distribution
1976	The Killing of a Chinese Bookie	Faces Distribution
1977	Opening Night	Faces Distribution
1980	Gloria	Columbia Pictures
1984	Love Streams	Cannon Films
1986	Big Trouble	Columbia Pictures

== Awards and nominations ==
As a filmmaker, he was nominated for the Academy Award for Best Original Screenplay for Faces (1968) and the Academy Award for Best Director for A Woman Under the Influence (1974). The Independent Spirit Awards named the John Cassavetes Award in his honor.

Year	Award	Category	Nominated work	Result	Ref.
1960	Venice International Film Festival	Pasinetti Award	Shadows	Nominated	
1960	British Academy Film Awards	Best Film	Shadows	Nominated	
1960	British Academy Film Awards	Un Award	Shadows	Nominated	
1967	Academy Awards	Best Supporting Actor	The Dirty Dozen	Nominated	
1968	Golden Globes	Best Supporting Actor	The Dirty Dozen	Nominated	
1968	Academy Awards	Best Original Screenplay	Faces	Nominated	
1968	Venice International Film Festival	Pasinetti Award	Faces	Won	
1968	Venice International Film Festival	Golden Lion	Faces	Nominated	
1969	Writers Guild of America	Best Original Screenplay	Faces	Nominated	
1969	National Society of Film Critics	Best Screenplay	Faces	Won	
1969	New York Film Critics Circle	Best Director	Faces	Nominated	
1973	Writers Guild of America	Best Original Screenplay	Minnie and Moskowitz	Nominated	
1974	Academy Awards	Best Director	A Woman Under the Influence	Nominated	
1974	Golden Globe Awards	Best Director	A Woman Under the Influence	Nominated	
1974	Golden Globe Awards	Best Screenplay	A Woman Under the Influence	Nominated	
1975	Writers Guild of America	Best Original Screenplay	A Woman Under the Influence	Nominated	
1978	Berlin International Film Festival	Golden Bear	Opening Night	Nominated	
1980	Venice Film Festival	Golden Lion	Gloria	Won	
1980	Venice Film Festival	Honorable Mention	Gloria	Won	
1980	Primetime Emmy Award	Outstanding Supporting Actor in a Limited Series or Movie	Flesh & Blood	Nominated	
1984	Berlin International Film Festival	Golden Bear	Love Streams	Won	
1984	Berlin International Film Festival	FIPRESCI Award	Love Streams	Won	
1986	Los Angeles Film Critics Association	Lifetime Achievement Award	John Cassavetes	Won	

Accolades for Cassavetes' film features
Year	Feature	Academy Awards		BAFTAs		Golden Globes	
Year	Feature	Nominations	Wins	Nominations	Wins	Nominations	Wins
1959	Shadows			4			
1968	Faces	3					
1970	Husbands					1	
1974	A Woman Under the Influence	2				4	1
1977	Opening Night					2	
1980	Gloria	1				1	
Total		6		4		8	1

Directed Academy Award performances
Under Cassavetes' direction, these actors have received Academy Award nominations for their performances in their respective roles.

Year	Performer	Film	Result
Academy Award for Best Actress
1974	Gena Rowlands	A Woman Under the Influence	Nominated
1980	Gena Rowlands	Gloria	Nominated
Academy Award for Best Supporting Actor
1968	Seymour Cassel	Faces	Nominated
Academy Award for Best Supporting Actress
1968	Lynn Carlin	Faces	Nominated
