= List of awards and nominations received by Federico Fellini =

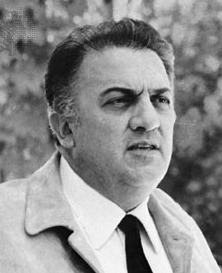
Federico Fellini in the 1970s

This article is a list of awards and nominations received by Federico Fellini

Fellini's films have received four Academy Awards for Best International Feature Film for La Strada (1956), Nights of Cabiria (1957), 8½ (1963), and Amarcord (1974). He won the Academy Honorary Award in 1992 for his contributions to cinema. After five British Academy Film Award nominations Fellini won the BAFTA Fellowship in 1987. He won the Venice Film Festival's Career Golden Lion for Lifetime Achievement and the Film Society of Lincoln Center Award for Cinematic Achievement both in 1985. Fellini also received five Golden Globe Award nominations.

== Major associations ==
=== Academy Awards ===
Year	Category	Nominated work	Result	Ref.
1946	Best Adapted Screenplay	Rome, Open City	Nominated	
1949	Best Original Screenplay	Paisan	Nominated	
1956	Best Original Screenplay	La Strada	Nominated	
1956	Best Foreign Language Film	La Strada	Won	
1957	Best Foreign Language Film	Nights of Cabiria	Won	
1957	Best Original Screenplay	I Vitelloni	Nominated	
1961	Best Original Screenplay	La Dolce Vita	Nominated	
1961	Best Director	La Dolce Vita	Nominated	
1963	Best Foreign Language Film	8½	Won	
1963	Best Original Screenplay	8½	Nominated	
1963	Best Director	8½	Nominated	
1970	Best Director	Fellini Satyricon	Nominated	
1974	Best Foreign Language Film	Amarcord	Won	
1975	Best Original Screenplay	Amarcord	Nominated	
1975	Best Director	Amarcord	Nominated	
1976	Best Adapted Screenplay	Fellini's Casanova	Nominated	
1992	Academy Honorary Award		Won	

=== BAFTA Awards ===
Year	Category	Nominated work	Result	Ref.
British Academy Film Awards
1955	Best Film from any Source	La Strada	Nominated	
1958	Best Film from any Source	Nights of Cabiria	Nominated	
1960	Best Film from any Source	La Dolce Vita	Nominated	
1963	Best Film from any Source	8½	Nominated	
1986	Best Film not in English Language	Ginger and Fred	Nominated	
1987	BAFTA Fellowship		Received	

=== Golden Globe Awards ===
Year	Category	Nominated work	Result	Ref.
1965	Best Foreign Language Film	Juliet of the Spirits	Won	
1969	Best Foreign Language Film	Fellini Satyricon	Nominated	
1972	Best Foreign Language Film	Roma	Nominated	
1974	Best Foreign Language Film	Amarcord	Nominated	
1986	Best Foreign Language Film	Ginger and Fred	Nominated	

== Festival awards ==
=== Cannes Film Festival ===
Year	Category	Nominated work	Result	Ref.
1960	Palme d'Or	La Dolce Vita	Won	
1974	Career Palme d'Or		Received	
1987	Special 40th Anniversary Prize	Intervista	Won	

=== Venice International Film Festival ===
Year	Category	Nominated work	Result	Ref.
1953	Silver Lion	I Vitelloni	Won	
1953	Golden Lion	I Vitelloni	Nominated	
1954	Silver Lion	La strada	Won	
1954	Golden Lion	La strada	Nominated	
1954	Honorable Mention	La strada	Won	
1965	Golden Lion	Juliet of the Spirits	Nominated	
1969	Pasinetti Award	Fellini Satyricon	Won	
1970	Pasinetti Award	I Clowns	Won	
1985	Career Golden Lion		Received	

== Critics awards ==
=== New York Film Critics Circle ===
Year	Category	Nominated work	Result	Ref.
1956	Best Foreign Language Film	La Strada	Won	
1960	Best Foreign Language Film	La Dolce Vita	Won	
1964	Best Foreign Language Film	8½	Won	
1965	Best Foreign Language Film	Juliet of the Spirits	Won	
1970	Best Director	Fellini Satyricon	Nominated	
1974	Best Film	Amarcord	Won	
1974	Best Director	Amarcord	Won	

=== National Board of Review ===
Year	Category	Nominated work	Result	Ref.
1960	Best Foreign Film	La Dolce Vita	Won	
1964	Best Foreign Film	8½	Won	
1965	Best Foreign Film	Juliet of the Spirits	Won	
1970	Best Foreign Film	I Clowns	Won	
1974	Best Foreign Film	Amarcord	Won	

== Miscellaneous awards ==
Year	Award	Category	Nominated work	Result
1954	Italian National Syndicate of Film Journalists	Best Director	I Vitelloni	Won
1955	Italian National Syndicate of Film Journalists	Best Director	La Strada	Won
1956	Bodil Awards	Best European Film	La Strada	Won
1957	David di Donatello	Best Director	Nights of Cabiria	Won
1958	Italian National Syndicate of Film Journalists	Best Director	Nights of Cabiria	Won
1960	David di Donatello	Best Director	La Dolce Vita	Won
1963	Moscow International Film Festival	The Grand Prix	8½	Won
1964	Bodil Awards	Best European Film	8½	Won
1964	Italian National Syndicate of Film Journalists	Best Director	8½	Won
1974	David di Donatello	Best Director	Amarcord	Won
1974	National Society of Film Critics	Best Director	Amarcord	Runner-up
1975	Bodil Awards	Best European Film	Amarcord	Won
1974	Italian National Syndicate of Film Journalists	Best Director	Amarcord	Won
1980	Italian National Syndicate of Film Journalists	Best Director	City of Women	Won
1984	David di Donatello	Best Director	And the Ship Sails On	Nominated
1986	David di Donatello	Best Director	Ginger and Fred	Nominated
1987	César Awards	Best Foreign Film	Intervista	Nominated
1987	Moscow International Film Festival	Golden Prize	Intervista	Won
1987	David di Donatello	Best Director	Intervista	Nominated
1990	David di Donatello	Best Director	The Voice of the Moon	Nominated

== Honorary awards ==
Year	Award
1964	Order of Merit of the Italian Republic's Grande Ufficiale OMRI
1974	Cannes Film Festival's Lifetime Achievement Award
1985	Venice Film Festival's Lifetime Achievement
1985	Film Society of Lincoln Center Award for Cinematic Achievement
1987	Order of Merit of the Italian Republic Cavaliere di Gran Croce OMRI
1987	BAFTA Fellowship
1989	European Film Awards Lifetime Achievement Award
1990	Japan Art Association's Praemium Imperiale
1993	Academy Awards for Lifetime Achievement
