= 27th Writers Guild of America Awards =

27th WGA Awards
- Date: 1975
- Organized by: Writers Guild of America, East and the Writers Guild of America, West

The 27th Writers Guild of America Awards honored the best film writers and television writers of 1974. Winners were announced in 1975.

== Winners and nominees ==
=== Film ===
Winners are listed first highlighted in boldface.

**Best Drama Written Directly for the Screen**: **Chinatown, Written by Robert Towne**; A Woman Under the Influence, Written by John Cassavetes; Alice Doesn't Live Here Anymore, Written by Robert Getchell; Harry and Tonto, Written by Paul Mazursky and Josh Greenfeld; The Conversation, Written by Francis Ford Coppola	**Best Comedy Written Directly for the Screen**: **Blazing Saddles, Written by Mel Brooks, Norman Steinberg, Andrew Bergman, Richard Pryor and Alan Uger**; California Split, Written by Joseph Walsh; Claudine, Written by Tina Pine and Lester Pine; Phantom of the Paradise, Written by Brian de Palma; The Sugarland Express, Written by Hal Barwood, Matthew Robbins and Steven Spielberg
**Best Drama Adapted from Another Medium**: **The Godfather: Part II, Screenplay by Francis Ford Coppola and Mario Puzo; Based on the novel by Mario Puzo**; Conrack, Screenplay by Irving Ravetch and Harriet Frank Jr.; Based on the book "The Water Is Wilde" by Pat Conroy; Lenny, Screenplay by Julian Barry; Based on the play by Julian Barry; The Parallax View, Screenplay by David Giler and Lorenzo Sempler Jr.; Based on the novel by Loren Singer; The Taking of Pelham One Two Three, Screenplay by Peter Stone; Based on the novel by John Godey	**Best Comedy Adapted from Another Medium**: **The Apprenticeship of Duddy Kravitz, Screenplay by Mordecai Richler and Lionel Chetwynd; Based on the novel by Mordecai Richler**; The Front Page, Screenplay by Billy Wilder and I.A.L. Diamond; Based on the play by Ben Hecht and Charles MacArthur; Young Frankenstein, Screenplay by Gene Wilder and Mel Brooks; Based on characters in the novel Frankenstein by Mary Shelley

=== Television ===
**Episodic Comedy**: **"O.R." – M*A*S*H (CBS) – Larry Gelbart and Laurence Marks**; "Private Charles Lamb" – M*A*S*H (CBS) – Sid Dorfman; "You Can Go Home Again" – Rhoda (CBS) – Patricia Nardo and Gloria Banta; "Parent's Day" – Rhoda (CBS) – Charlotte Brown; "Will Mary Richards Go to Jail?" – The Mary Tyler Moore Show (ABC) – Ed Weinberger and Stan Daniels	**Episodic Drama**: **"Thirty a Month and Found" – Gunsmoke (CBS) – Jim Byrnes**; "The Colorado Cattle Caper" – McCloud (NBC) – Michael Gleason; "The World Is: Growth" – The New Land (ABC) – William Blinn; "The Conflict" – The Waltons (CBS) – Jeb Rosebrook
**Daytime Serials**: **Search for Tomorrow (CBS) – Ann Marcus, Joyce Perry, Pamela Wylie and Ray Goldstone**; Days of Our Lives (NBC) – William J. Bell, Patricia Falken Smith, Bill Rega and Margaret Stewart; Love of Life (CBS) – Paul Avila Mayer, Claire Labine, Nancy Ford and Clarice Blackburn

=== Special awards ===
Laurel Award for Screenwriting Achievement
**Preston Sturges**
Valentine Davies Award
**Fay Kanin**
Morgan Cox Award
**Edmund H. North**
Edmund J North Award
**James R. Webb**
