= 27th Directors Guild of America Awards =

- Date: March 15, 1975
- Country: United States
- Presented by: Directors Guild of America

Highlights
- Best Director Feature Film: The Godfather Part II – Francis Ford Coppola
- Website: https://www.dga.org/Awards/History/1970s/1974.aspx?value=1974

The 27th Directors Guild of America Awards, honoring the outstanding directorial achievements in film and television in 1974, were presented on March 15, 1975.

== Winners and nominees ==
=== Film ===
Feature Film

Francis Ford Coppola – The Godfather Part II

- Francis Ford Coppola – The Conversation
- Bob Fosse – Lenny
- Sidney Lumet – Murder on the Orient Express
- Roman Polanski – Chinatown

=== Television ===
Drama Series

David Friedkin – Kojak for "Cross Your Heart, Hope to Die"

- Corey Allen – The Streets of San Francisco for "Cry Help"
- Harry Falk – The Streets of San Francisco for "Mask of Death"
Comedy Series

Hy Averback – M*A*S*H for "Alcoholics Unanimous"

- Robert Moore – Rhoda for "Rhoda's Wedding"
- Jay Sandrich – Mary Tyler Moore for "Will Mary Richards Go to Jail?"
Movies for Television and Mini-Series

John Korty – The Autobiography of Miss Jane Pittman

- Tom Gries – QB VII
- Lamont Johnson – The Execution of Private Slovik
Musical Variety

Roger Englander – New York Philharmonic Young People's Concerts for "What Makes a Gershwin Tune a Gershwin Tune?"

- Arthur Fisher – The Sonny & Cher Comedy Hour
- Nick Vanoff – The Perry Como Christmas Show
Documentary/News

Bill Foster – AFI Life Achievement Award: A Tribute to James Cagney

- Arthur Bloom – 60 Minutes
- Charles Braverman –ABC's Wide World of Entertainment for Birth and Babies

=== Outstanding Television Director ===
- John Korty

=== Honorary Life Member ===
- Lew Wasserman
