= Scenes from a Marriage =

1973 television miniseries by Ingmar Bergman

- The Criterion Collection DVD cover
- Swedish: Scener ur ett äktenskap
- Written by: Ingmar Bergman
- Directed by: Ingmar Bergman
- Starring: Liv Ullmann; Erland Josephson; Bibi Andersson
- Country of origin: Sweden
- Original language: Swedish

Production
- Producer: Lars-Owe Carlberg
- Cinematography: Sven Nykvist
- Running time: 281 minutes (TV version); 167 minutes (theatrical)
- Budget: US$150,000

Original release
- Network: SVT
- Release: 11 April – 16 May 1973

Scenes from a Marriage (Swedish: Scener ur ett äktenskap) is a 1973 Swedish television miniseries written and directed by Ingmar Bergman. Over the course of six hour-long episodes, it explores the disintegration of the marriage between Marianne (Liv Ullmann), a divorce lawyer, and Johan (Erland Josephson), a reader in psychology. The series spans a period of 10 years. Bergman's teleplay draws on his own experiences, including his relationship with Ullmann. It was shot on a small budget in Stockholm and Fårö in 1972.

After initially airing on Swedish TV in six parts, the miniseries was condensed into a theatrical version and received positive reviews in Sweden and internationally. Scenes from a Marriage was also the subject of controversy for its perceived influence on rising divorce rates in Europe. The film was ineligible for the Academy Award for Best Foreign Language Film, but won the Golden Globe Award for Best Foreign Language Film and several other honours. The miniseries and film version influenced filmmakers such as Woody Allen and Richard Linklater. It was followed by a sequel, Saraband, in 2003, and stage adaptations. It was also adapted into an HBO miniseries in 2021.

== Episodes ==
The TV miniseries' six episodes ran between 11 April and 16 May 1973. At about 50 minutes per episode, the miniseries totals 282 minutes.

Scenes from each episode appear in the film version, which is 168 minutes long. The episode titles appear in the film version as chapter titles.

No.	Title	Original release date
1	"Innocence and Panic (Oskuld och panik)"	11 April 1973
An affluent couple, Marianne and Johan, are interviewed for a magazine series on love after having renewed their marriage contract after their 10th anniversary. In the interview, they come across as an ideal couple with two daughters. Afterward, they entertain the couple Peter and Katarina, who have a miserable relationship. Marianne reveals to Johan she is pregnant, and she winds up having an abortion.
2	"The Art of Sweeping Things Under the Rug (Konsten att sopa under mattan)"	18 April 1973
Marianne wakes up one morning determined not to visit her parents for dinner, as the family usually does each week, but backs down. At the university where Johan works, he shares poetry that he has not let Marianne see with a female colleague, who tells him it is mediocre. Later, Marianne and Johan debate the lack of joy they take in their sex life.
3	"Paula"	25 April 1973
Johan reveals to Marianne that he is having an affair with a much younger woman named Paula, an unseen character, and wants a separation. He intends to leave home for many months, and shares his frustrations about their marriage and longtime desire to leave. Upon phoning a friend for help, Marianne learns many of her friends knew about the affair before she did.
4	"The Vale of Tears (Tåredalen)"	2 May 1973
Johan visits Marianne, disclosing he intends to take a position at Cleveland University. Marianne then suggests they should finalize a divorce, hinting she is interested in remarrying. She shares what she has learned about herself in therapy, but Johan doesn't listen.
5	"The Illiterates (Analfabeterna)"	9 May 1973
Marianne and Johan meet to finalize their divorce, leading to more arguments over the division of their belongings, the upbringing of their daughters and Marianne's new enjoyment of sex with her current partner. After the arguments escalate into physical violence, Johan sadly signs the papers.
6	"In the Middle of the Night in a Dark House Somewhere in the World (Mitt i natten ett mörkt hus någonstans i världen)"	16 May 1973
Despite having both been remarried to other people, Marianne and Johan meet for an affair. Marianne reveals she had an affair in 1955, very shortly after they were married. It has been 20 years since they were married. Going to a friend's country house, Marianne has a nightmare, and wakes up fretting she has never loved or been loved. Johan comforts her that they share an imperfect love.

== Cast ==
- Liv Ullmann as Marianne
- Erland Josephson as Johan
- Bibi Andersson as Katarina
- Jan Malmsjö as Peter
- Gunnel Lindblom as Eva, colleague to Johan
- Anita Wall as Fru [Mrs] Palm
- Barbro Hiort af Ornäs as Fru Jacobi
- Rossana Mariano as Eva, 12-year-old daughter to Johan and Marianne
- Lena Bergman as Karin, Eva's sister
- Wenche Foss as Modern [the Mother]
- Bertil Norström as Arne

== Production ==
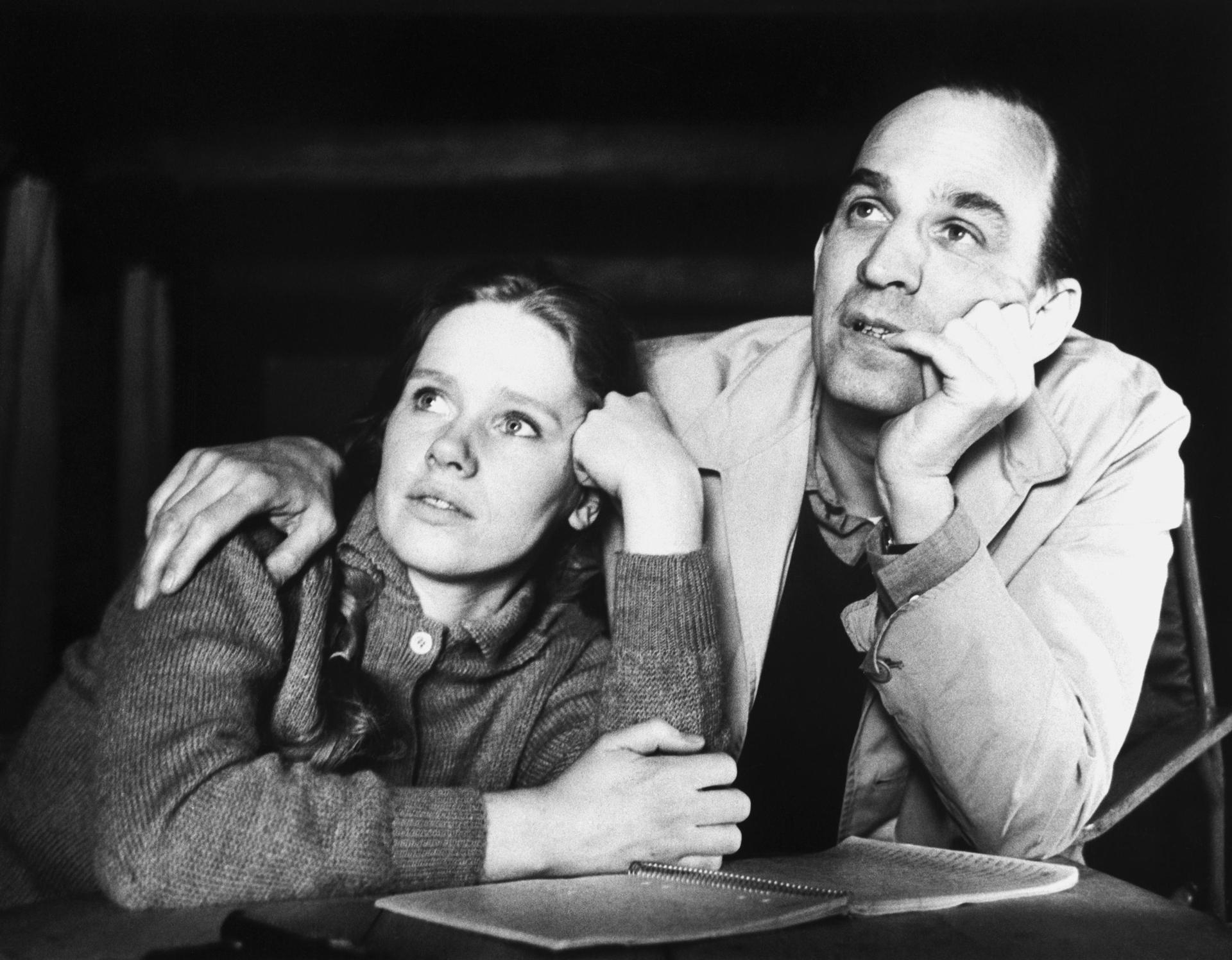
Director Ingmar Bergman drew on personal experiences with actress Liv Ullmann in writing the teleplay.

Bergman wrote the teleplay for Scenes From a Marriage over three months. He drew on his personal experiences, including his relationship with Ullmann; his unhappy, eventually dissolved marriages to Käbi Laretei and Gun Hagberg; and the marriage of his parents, Karin and Erik Bergman. As a boy, he had witnessed his parents violently wrestling, with Karin slapping Erik and Erik pushing her against a wall. Ingmar also found his mother could be manipulative.

The budget for Scenes From a Marriage was approximately a third that of Bergman's previous film, Cries and Whispers. Half was covered by Swedish Television and half by foreign companies. It was filmed in Stockholm and Fårö between July and October 1972. Cinematographer Sven Nykvist emphasized close-ups and employed small indoor film sets. Nykvist later regretted not using more tracking shots when he learned the miniseries would have a theatrical release. The filming schedule was one week per episode.

Ullmann compared performing in Scenes From a Marriage to appearing in a documentary, saying she "felt very connected to the role." She said she was becoming more involved in the feminist movement while making the miniseries. Due to Ullmann and Erland Josephson's comfort with their parts, the crew saved time by not having rehearsals.

== Release ==
Scenes From a Marriage was broadcast as a miniseries in Sweden by SVT2 beginning on 11 April 1973. Polls indicated most of the viewers were women. A 169-minute theatrical version was screened in Sweden on 28 October 1974.

In the United States, a 167-minute version of the miniseries was released in cinemas, with the 16 mm film modified to 35 mm. It opened in New York City on 21 September 1974. The full miniseries was later aired in the U.S. by PBS in March and April 1977, and numerous times in 1979. Additionally, a British-dubbed version aired on BBC Two in 1975. The Criterion Collection released the miniseries and theatrical version on a three-disc DVD in Region 1 in 2004, complete with interviews and an essay by Phillip Lopate.

== Reception ==
=== Critical reception ===
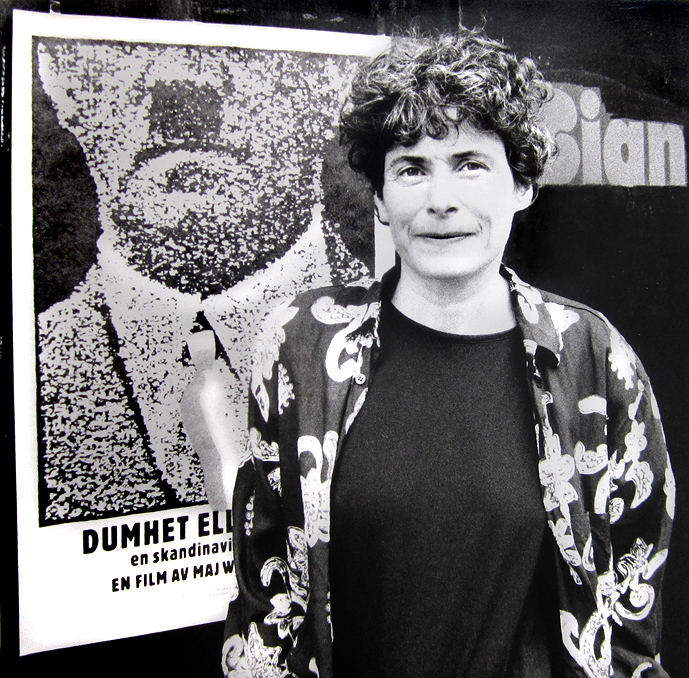
Swedish director Maj Wechselmann criticized Scenes from a Marriage for its approach to marriage roles.

In Sweden, Scenes from a Marriage received positive reviews for its dialogue and realism, with Mauritz Edstrom calling it "one of Bergman's finest human portrayals". Åke Janzon said that while the miniseries was not a masterpiece, it demonstrated psychological tension. Swedish director Maj Wechselmann criticized it on feminist grounds, saying it failed to criticize marriage roles. Bergman replied that the miniseries was meant to depict "Marianne's liberation" and female "suppressed aggressions". One controversy revolved around allegations that Scenes From a Marriage led to higher divorce rates in Sweden and around Europe by teaching couples to communicate their conflicts. Swedish divorce rates allegedly doubled one year after the miniseries was broadcast in 1973. In 2013 Rachel Halliburton disputed these allegations in Time Out magazine, remarking that sexual and women's liberation were gaining prominence at the time and that the miniseries "as such was as much a symptom of what was happening to modern marriage as a cause".

In the United States, Roger Ebert gave the theatrical version a full four stars, calling it "one of the truest, most luminous love stories ever made" and "the best film of 1974". Vincent Canby, chief critic for The New York Times, called the theatrical version "a movie of such extraordinary intimacy that it has the effect of breaking into mysterious components many things we ordinarily accept without thought, familiar and banal objects, faces, attitudes, and emotions, especially love. [...] Ullmann again establishes herself as one of the most fascinating actresses of our time." Canby also wrote that "Josephson gives an equally complex performance" but found the character less admirable. Don Druker of Chicago Reader criticized the editing for the cinema, saying that the film "shows its reassembled status rather badly" and that "moments of searing insight" were provided mainly by Ullmann.

The film was included in "The New York Times Guide to the Best 1,000 Movies Ever Made" in 2002. In 2004, essayist Phillip Lopate wrote that Scenes from a Marriage showed Bergman moving on from exploration of God's silence to the subject of men, women, love and intimacy. Lopate found the film version "more harrowing and theatrical," while the miniseries "has the tendency to intersect with and form a more quotidian relationship to viewers’ lives; its characters become members of the family, and their resilience over time, regardless of the incessant crises thrown them by the script, induces a more good-humored, forgiving atmosphere." In 2007, Kristi McKim of Senses of Cinema wrote that the film "stunningly exemplified" the "tension" in "the emotional causes and effects of feeling incompatible desires within the modern world." The film has an 88% approval rating on Rotten Tomatoes, based on 24 reviews, and an average rating of 8.6/10. It was included on BBC's 2018 list of the 100 greatest foreign-language films.

=== Accolades ===
The National Board of Review named Scenes from a Marriage one of the top foreign-language films of 1974. It sparked controversy when its ineligibility for the Academy Award for Best Foreign Language Film was questioned. The supposed reason was that it aired on television before it played in cinemas, but at the time that did not necessarily render a film ineligible. In this case, it was because the TV broadcast occurred the year before its theatrical debut in 1974. The film's ineligibility prompted 24 filmmakers, including Frank Capra and Federico Fellini, to write an open letter demanding the rules for eligibility be revised.

Award	Date of ceremony	Category	Recipient(s)	Result	Ref(s)
BAFTA Awards	1976	Best Actress	Liv Ullmann	Nominated	
Golden Globes	25 January 1975	Best Foreign Language Film	Scenes from a Marriage	Won	
Golden Globes	25 January 1975	Best Actress in a Motion Picture – Drama	Liv Ullmann	Nominated	
National Society of Film Critics	5 January 1975	Best Film	Scenes from a Marriage	Won	
National Society of Film Critics	5 January 1975	Best Screenplay	Ingmar Bergman	Won	
National Society of Film Critics	5 January 1975	Best Director	Ingmar Bergman	Runner-up	
National Society of Film Critics	5 January 1975	Best Actress	Liv Ullmann	Won	
National Society of Film Critics	5 January 1975	Best Supporting Actress	Bibi Andersson	Won	
New York Film Critics Circle	28 January 1975	Best Film	Scenes from a Marriage	Runner-up	
New York Film Critics Circle	28 January 1975	Best Director	Ingmar Bergman	Runner-up	
New York Film Critics Circle	28 January 1975	Best Screenplay	Ingmar Bergman	Won	
New York Film Critics Circle	28 January 1975	Best Actress	Liv Ullmann	Won	
New York Film Critics Circle	28 January 1975	Best Supporting Actress	Bibi Andersson	Runner-up	

== Legacy ==
Bergman's 1980 television film From the Life of the Marionettes centres on a couple named Peter and Katarina, loosely based on the supporting characters of those names in Scenes from a Marriage. Bergman also wrote the first stage adaptation of Scenes from a Marriage for the Residenztheater in Munich in 1981. Saraband, a quasi-sequel set decades after the original miniseries, aired on Swedish television in 2003. In 2008, a theatrical adaption by Joanna Murray-Smith was performed at the Belgrade Theatre in Coventry, directed by Trevor Nunn and starring Imogen Stubbs and Iain Glen.

Knots Landing creator David Jacobs based the series on Scenes from a Marriage. Shashi Deshpande informally adapted it into the screenplay for Govind Nihalani's Drishti in 1990. In 1991, Woody Allen costarred in Paul Mazursky's Scenes from a Mall, a dark comedy about a deteriorating marriage. Allen's similarly realist 1992 film Husbands and Wives is also influenced by Scenes from a Marriage. Some critics compared Allen's Annie Hall (1977) to Scenes from a Marriage.

In an April 2011 New York Times Opinionator article titled "Too Much Relationship Vérité", Virginia Heffernan compares An American Family to Scenes from a Marriage:

It's now the future. And the 12-hour PBS time capsule, which will make a rare reappearance next week at the Paley Center in Manhattan and on some public-TV affiliates beginning Saturday, looks more like performance art than social science. Hammy stunts for the camera alternate with Bergman-esque staging. ("Scenes from a Marriage", Bergman’s fictional TV series, also appeared in 1973, in Sweden.)

In June 2013, actor Ethan Hawke and director Richard Linklater said Scenes from a Marriage was the standard by which their Before Midnight must be judged. Russian director Andrey Zvyagintsev initially conceived Loveless (2017) as a remake of Scenes from a Marriage, with critics also comparing Zvyagintsev's finished product to Bergman's miniseries. Noah Baumbach's Marriage Story (2019) also contains references to Scenes from a Marriage.
