= Lenny (film) =

1974 American biographical drama film by Bob Fosse

- Original film poster
- Directed by: Bob Fosse
- Screenplay by: Julian Barry
- Based on: Lenny; 1971 play by Julian Barry
- Produced by: Marvin Worth
- Starring: Dustin Hoffman; Valerie Perrine
- Cinematography: Bruce Surtees
- Edited by: Alan Heim
- Music by: Ralph Burns
- Production companies: Marvin Worth Productions; Tribe Entertainment Group
- Distributed by: United Artists
- Release date: November 10, 1974
- Running time: 111 minutes
- Country: United States
- Language: English
- Budget: $2.7 million
- Box office: $11.6 million (rentals)

Lenny is a 1974 American biographical drama film about the comedian Lenny Bruce, starring Dustin Hoffman and directed by Bob Fosse. The screenplay by Julian Barry is based on his play of the same name.

== Plot ==
The film jumps between various sections of Lenny Bruce's life, including scenes of when he was in his prime, and the burned-out, strung-out performer who, in the twilight of his life, used his nightclub act to pour out his personal frustrations. Up-and-coming Bruce courts his "Shiksa goddess", a stripper named Honey. With family responsibilities, Lenny is encouraged to do a "safe" act, but he cannot do it. Constantly in trouble for flouting obscenity laws, Lenny develops a near-messianic complex that fuels both his comedy genius and his talent for self-destruction. Worn out by a lifetime of tilting at establishment windmills, Lenny Bruce dies of a morphine overdose in 1966.

== Cast ==
- Dustin Hoffman as Lenny Bruce
- Valerie Perrine as Honey Bruce
- Jan Miner as Sally Marr
- Stanley Beck as Artie Silver
- Rashel Novikoff as Aunt Mema
- Gary Morton as Sherman Hart
- Guy Rennie as Jack Goldman
- Aldo Demeo as Bailiff

== Production ==
The part of Honey Bruce was originally offered to Lynda Day George, who turned it down because she was uncomfortable with the nudity and harsh subject matter.

== Release ==
Lenny opened at Cinema I in New York City on November 10, 1974, and grossed a house record $14,981 in its first day.

== Reception ==
=== Critical response ===
On Rotten Tomatoes, the film has an approval rating of 88% based on 34 reviews. The critical consensus reads: "Dustin Hoffman inhabits Lenny Bruce with nervy energy in Bob Fosse's richly stylized telling of the pioneering comedian's career and downfall." On Metacritic, it has a score of 61 out of 100, based on 9 critic reviews, indicating "generally favorable" reviews.

Pauline Kael for The New Yorker wrote that the film was "for audiences who want to believe that Lenny Bruce was a saintly gadfly who was martyred for having lived before their time" and mentions it's "well made" but complains that it takes itself so "insufferably seriously." Kael finishes with the acknowledgement that the movie is "black and white earnest" and that the "youth-culture saintliness laid on Lenny Bruce are the ultimate in modern showbiz sentimentality."

One of the less enthusiastic reviews came from Roger Ebert, stating, "Unless we go in convinced that Lenny Bruce was an important performer, the movie doesn't convince us."

In 2012, British film critic Mark Kermode put Hoffman's performance as Lenny Bruce at number eight in a top-ten video of Hoffman's best performances.

=== Accolades ===
Award	Category	Nominee(s)	Result
Academy Awards	Best Picture	Marvin Worth	Nominated
Academy Awards	Best Director	Bob Fosse	Nominated
Academy Awards	Best Actor	Dustin Hoffman	Nominated
Academy Awards	Best Actress	Valerie Perrine	Nominated
Academy Awards	Best Screenplay – Adapted from Other Material	Julian Barry	Nominated
Academy Awards	Best Cinematography	Bruce Surtees	Nominated
Blue Ribbon Awards	Best Foreign Language Film	Bob Fosse	Won
British Academy Film Awards	Best Actor in a Leading Role	Dustin Hoffman	Nominated
British Academy Film Awards	Best Actress in a Leading Role	Valerie Perrine	Nominated
British Academy Film Awards	Most Promising Newcomer to Leading Film Roles	Valerie Perrine	Won
Cannes Film Festival	Palme D'Or	Bob Fosse	Nominated
Cannes Film Festival	Best Actress	Valerie Perrine	Won
Directors Guild of America Awards	Outstanding Directorial Achievement in Motion Pictures	Bob Fosse	Nominated
Golden Globe Awards	Best Actor in a Motion Picture – Drama	Dustin Hoffman	Nominated
Golden Globe Awards	Best Actress in a Motion Picture – Drama	Valerie Perrine	Nominated
Golden Globe Awards	Best Director – Motion Picture	Bob Fosse	Nominated
National Board of Review Awards	Top Ten Films		8th Place
National Board of Review Awards	Best Supporting Actress	Valerie Perrine	Won
New York Film Critics Circle Awards	Best Actor	Dustin Hoffman	Nominated
New York Film Critics Circle Awards	Best Actress	Valerie Perrine	Nominated
New York Film Critics Circle Awards	Best Supporting Actress	Valerie Perrine	Won
Sant Jordi Awards	Best Foreign Film	Bob Fosse	Won
Writers Guild of America Awards	Best Drama Adapted from Another Medium	Julian Barry	Nominated

== Home media ==
Lenny was released on DVD by MGM Home Video on April 1, 2003, in a Region 1 widescreen format, and by Twilight Time (under license from MGM and 20th Century Fox Home Entertainment) as a Region 1 widescreen Blu-ray on February 10, 2015. The Criterion Collection released a 4K restoration of the film on Blu-ray on May 26, 2026.

== See also ==
- List of American films of 1974
- List of black-and-white films produced since 1970
- George Carlin
