= The Last Detail =

1973 film directed by Hal Ashby

- Theatrical release poster
- Directed by: Hal Ashby
- Screenplay by: Robert Towne
- Based on: The Last Detail by Darryl Ponicsan
- Produced by: Gerald Ayres
- Starring: Jack Nicholson; Otis Young; Randy Quaid; Clifton James; Carol Kane
- Cinematography: Michael Chapman
- Edited by: Robert C. Jones
- Music by: Johnny Mandel
- Production companies: Acrobat Productions; Bright-Persky Associates
- Distributed by: Columbia Pictures
- Release date: December 12, 1973
- Running time: 104 minutes
- Country: United States
- Language: English
- Budget: $2.3 million
- Box office: $10 million

The Last Detail is a 1973 American comedy-drama film directed by Hal Ashby, from a screenplay by Robert Towne, based on the 1970 novel by Darryl Ponicsan. The film stars Jack Nicholson, Otis Young, Randy Quaid, Clifton James, and Carol Kane. It follows two career sailors assigned to escort a young emotionally withdrawn junior sailor from their Virginia base to Portsmouth Naval Prison in Maine.

The Last Detail was theatrically released in the United States by Columbia Pictures on December 12, 1973. The film received positive reviews from critics, who praised the performances of Nicholson, Young, and Quaid, as well as Towne's screenplay. It was nominated for two Golden Globe Awards, three Academy Awards, and four British Academy Film Awards (winning two).

The film is one of two 1973 film adaptations of Ponicsan's novels based on his experiences in the U.S. Navy; the other being Cinderella Liberty, starring James Caan and Marsha Mason.

== Plot ==
In Norfolk, Virginia, Navy lifers Signalman First Class Billy "Badass" Buddusky and Gunner's Mate First Class Richard "Mule" Mulhall are assigned a shore patrol detail escorting 18-year-old seaman Larry Meadows to Portsmouth Naval Prison near Kittery, Maine. Meadows has been court-martialed, dishonorably discharged, and has received a harsh sentence of eight years in the brig for attempting to steal $40 from a charity donation box, which happened to be run by the wife of the Norfolk Naval Base Commander.

Badass and Mule are given one week to escort Meadows to the Portsmouth brig. Despite their initial resentment of the detail, they soon come to like the young sailor, who is timid, naive, and resigned to his fate. They also discover that Meadows is a kleptomaniac. Believing that Meadows received an unjust sentence, Badass and Mule decide to make his journey to the brig as pleasant as possible; the pair make several stops along their route to provide bon-voyage adventures for the young man.

The trio's activities include bar-hopping, brawling with Marines, and other misadventures. They stay overnight at a hotel, drinking beer and watching TV after missing their train. Badass teaches Meadows some flag semaphore signals and tries to get the young prisoner to stick up for himself by provoking him into a fight, but is unsuccessful. The following morning, they take a detour to Camden, New Jersey to visit Meadows's mother, but she is not home. Meadows is embarrassed and ashamed after the three enter the house and find it unkempt with several empty liquor bottles lying around.

In New York City, the men encounter a group of chanting Nichiren Buddhists who teach Meadows how to pray. One of the Buddhists invites the three to a house party, where she offers to help Meadows flee his imprisonment and find refuge in Canada. Meadows declines, reasoning he does not want to cause trouble for his "best friends". Badass tries to seduce a woman at the party by talking about the romance of the sea, but she shows little interest. Mule makes awkward conversation about serving in the Navy with the liberal party guests.

In Boston, Badass and Mule take Meadows to a brothel so he can lose his virginity. When alone with a young prostitute, Meadows immediately ejaculates, but Mule and Badass pay for Meadows to have a second chance. While they wait, Badass and Mule make conversation about their lives outside of the Navy. Badass reveals a previous marriage dissolved because his wife wanted him to be a TV repairman. Mule has not married and is still supporting his mother. The next morning, Meadows tells the two men that despite the young prostitute's profession, he thinks she may have developed romantic feelings for him.

Just as they are about to leave for Portsmouth, Meadows suggests they go on a picnic. The senior sailors buy some hot dogs and attempt an uncomfortable barbecue in the snow at a local park, where Badass confides in Mule about his concern for Meadows and the potential abuse that he will face in prison. Meadows suddenly attempts to run away in a last-ditch effort to escape, but he falls down and is caught by the two men, who subdue and pummel him.

Badass, Mule and Meadows finally arrive at the prison; before they can say goodbye, Meadows is immediately marched off to be processed. The young duty officer, a Marine first lieutenant wearing an Annapolis ring, notices Meadows's injuries and berates Badass and Mule. The sailors are asked if Meadows tried to resist or fight, which they deny. The officer continues to give them a difficult time and points out that their orders were never signed by the master-at-arms in Norfolk, and claiming that as far the Navy is concerned, the orders are still in Norfolk. The officer says the pair are in deep trouble but relents when they demand to speak to his boss, the Executive Officer. On the way out, Badass admonishes the officer for forgetting to keep his copy of the paperwork. With the detail complete, the pair stride away from the prison complaining about the officer's incompetence. Both hope their orders will have come through by the time they arrive back in Norfolk.

== Cast ==
- Jack Nicholson as Signalman 1st Class Billy L. "Badass" Buddusky
- Otis Young as Gunner's Mate 1st Class Richard "Mule" Mulhall
- Randy Quaid as Seaman Laurence M. "Larry" Meadows
- Clifton James as M.A.A.
- Carol Kane as Young Prostitute
- Michael Moriarty as First Lieutenant Marine Duty Officer
- Nancy Allen as Nancy
- Gilda Radner as Nichiren Shoshu Member
- Jim Hohn as Nichiren Shoshu Member
- Luana Anders as Donna
- Kathleen Miller as Annette
- Gerry Salsberg as Henry
- Pat Hamilton as Madame
- Don McGovern as The Bartender

== Production ==
Producer Gerry Ayres had bought the rights to Darryl Ponicsan's novel in 1969. After returning from the set of Drive, He Said, Robert Towne began adapting the novel. The screenwriter tailored the script for close friends Jack Nicholson and Rupert Crosse. In adapting the novel, Towne removed Buddusky's "closet intellectualism and his beautiful wife". The screenwriter also changed the ending so that Buddusky lives instead of dying as he does in the book. Ayres convinced Columbia Pictures to produce the film based on his consultant's credit on Bonnie & Clyde but had difficulty getting it made because of the studio's concern about the coarse language in Towne's script. Peter Guber recalled, "The first seven minutes, there were 342 'fucks'". The head of Columbia asked Towne to reduce the number of curse words to which the writer responded, "This is the way people talk when they're powerless to act; they bitch". Towne refused to tone down the language and the project remained in limbo until Nicholson, by then a bankable star, got involved.

Ayres sent the script to Robert Altman and then Hal Ashby. Ayres remembers, "I thought that this was a picture that required a skewed perspective, and that's what Hal had". Ashby was coming off the disappointing commercial and critical failure of Harold and Maude and was in pre-production on Three Cornered Circle at Metro-Goldwyn-Mayer when Jack Nicholson told him about The Last Detail, his upcoming film at Columbia. The director had been sent the script in the fall of 1971, with a reader's report calling it "lengthy and unimaginative", but he personally found it very appealing.

He wanted to do it but it conflicted with his schedule for Three Cornered Circle. Ashby pulled out of his deal with MGM, and Nicholson suggested that they team up on Last Detail. Columbia did not like Ashby because he had a reputation of distrusting authority and made little effort to communicate with executives. The $2.3 million budget was low enough for him to get approved.

=== Casting ===
Nicholson was set to play Buddusky; additional casting focused mainly on the roles of Mule and Meadows. Bud Cort met with Ashby and begged to play Meadows, but the director felt that he was not right for the role. Robert Englund also auditioned for the role of Meadows. Casting director Lynn Stalmaster gave Ashby a final selection of actors, and the two that stood out were Randy Quaid and John Travolta. As originally written, the character of Meadows was a "helpless little guy", but Ashby wanted to cast Quaid, who was 6'4". He had offbeat and vulnerable qualities that Ashby wanted. Towne remembers thinking, "There's a real poignancy to this huge guy's helplessness that's great. I thought it was a fantastic choice, and I'd never thought of it." Rupert Crosse was cast as Mule. Gilda Radner was cast in her first screen role, speaking one line as a member of Nichiren Shoshu. Director Hal Ashby also appears in a brief cameo in the New York bar scene as the bearded man observing Buddusky's dart game.

=== Pre-production ===
The project stalled for 18 months while Nicholson made The King of Marvin Gardens. Guber told Ayres that he could get Burt Reynolds, Jim Brown, and David Cassidy and a new writer, and he would approve production immediately. Ayres rejected this proposal, and the studio agreed to wait because they were afraid that the producer would take the film to another studio. Ashby and Ayres read navy publications and interviewed current and ex-servicemen who helped them correct minor errors in the script. The director wanted to shoot on location at the naval base in Norfolk, Virginia, and the brig at Portsmouth, New Hampshire, but was unable to get permission from the United States Navy. However, the Canadian Navy was willing to cooperate and in mid-August 1972, Ashby and his casting director Stalmaster traveled to Toronto, Ontario to look at a naval base and meet with actors. The base suited their needs and Ashby met Carol Kane, whom he would cast in a small role. Opening scenes of the film were not shot at a Canadian Naval Base, but rather at CFB Borden, a major training base in Ontario for the Canadian Air Force and Army.

Ashby was busted for possession of marijuana while scouting locations in Canada. This almost changed the studio's mind about backing the project, but the director's drug bust was not widely reported and Nicholson remained fiercely loyal to him, which was a deciding factor. Just as the film was about to go into production, Crosse was diagnosed with terminal cancer. Ashby postponed principal photography for a week to allow Crosse to deal with the news and decide if he still wanted to do the film. The actor decided not to do the film, and Ashby and Stalmaster scrambled to find a replacement. They cast Otis Young.

=== Principal photography ===
Ashby decided to shoot the film chronologically in order to help the inexperienced Quaid and recently cast Young ease into their characters. With the exception of Toronto doubling as Norfolk, the production shot on location, making the same journey as the three main characters. Early on, Quaid was very nervous and wanted to make a good impression. Ashby kept a close eye on the actor but allowed him to develop into the role. Haskell Wexler was supposed to shoot The Last Detail, but he could not get a union card for an East Coast production. Ashby asked Nestor Almendros and Gordon Willis but they were both unavailable.

The script originally called for the three sailors to cavort on the steps of the Supreme Court. But Chief Justice Warren E. Burger denied permission, reportedly in retaliation for Nicholson's public criticism of Richard Nixon, who appointed Burger to his position.

Ashby promoted Michael Chapman, his camera operator on The Landlord, to director of photography. They worked together to create a specific look for the film that involved using natural light to create a realistic, documentary style. Ashby let Nicholson look through the camera's viewfinder as a shot was being set up so he knew the parameters of a given scene and how much freedom he had within the frame. The actor said, "Hal is the first director to let me go, to let me find my own level".

=== Post-production ===
The day after principal photography was completed, Ashby had his editor send what he had cut together so far. Ashby was shocked at the results and fired the editor, becoming afraid he would have to edit the film himself. Ayres recommended bringing in Robert C. Jones, one of the fastest editors in the business, who had been nominated for an Academy Award for Guess Who's Coming to Dinner. Jones put the film back into rushes and six weeks later had a first cut ready that ran four hours. Ashby was very impressed with his abilities and trusted him completely. Jones cut the film with Ashby at the filmmaker's home. The process took an unusually long time, as the director agonized over all the footage he had shot. Ashby would ignore phone calls from Columbia, and eventually executives higher and higher up the corporate ladder tried to contact him. Ashby was in London, meeting with Peter Sellers about doing Being There when he received a phone call from Jones, who told him that Columbia was fed up with the time it was taking for the film to be assembled. The head of the studio's editing department called Jones to say that a representative was coming to take the film. Jones refused to give up the film, and Ashby called the studio and managed to calm down the officials. Towne occasionally visited Ashby's house to check in and did not like the pacing of the film. According to Towne, Ashby "left his dramatizing to the editing room, and the effect was a thinning out of the script". During the editing process, Columbia hated the jump cuts Ashby employed. The studio was also concerned about the number of expletives. It needed a commercial hit as they were in major financial trouble. By August 1973, the final cut of The Last Detail was completed and submitted to the MPAA, which gave it an R rating.

Columbia was still not happy with the film and asked for 26 lines to be cut that had the word "fuck" in them. The theatrical release of The Last Detail was delayed for six months while Columbia fought over the profanity issue. The film contained 65 uses of "fuck" overall and at the time of its release, broke the record for most uses of the word in a motion picture. Ashby persuaded Columbia to let him preview the film to see how the public would react. It was shown in San Francisco, and the screening was a huge success.

== Release ==
=== Box office ===
Ayres persuaded Columbia to submit The Last Detail to the Cannes Film Festival. After Nicholson won Best Actor there, the studio finally gave the film a theatrical release. The film opened at the Bruin Theater in Westwood, Los Angeles for a special 11-day Academy Award qualifying engagement where it grossed $46,369. A wide release was planned for the spring of 1974. The film was not a box office success, despite Oscar nominations for Nicholson, Quaid, and Towne by the time of the wide opening. The film would go on to earn $5 million in rentals at the North American box office.

=== Home media ===
It was initially released on VHS and Betamax videocassettes, and Laserdisc and Capacitance Electronic Disc (CED) Videodiscs, then later on DVD. Sony Pictures released The Last Detail on DVD in the United States on December 14, 1999. It was first made available on Blu-ray disc as a limited edition by boutique label Twilight Time in the United States on January 19, 2016, with two special features, an isolated score track and a theatrical trailer. The film was released in the UK by Powerhouse Films initially as a limited dual format edition set on February 27, 2017. Supplemental features include two cuts of the movie, original trailer; promotional materials; new interview with director of photography Michael Chapman; and a booklet.

== Reception ==
=== Critical response ===
The film received very positive reviews. In The New York Times, Vincent Canby said Nicholson's performance was "by far the best thing he's ever done". Variety magazine also praised Nicholson, saying he was "outstanding at the head of a superb cast". Gene Siskel of the Chicago Tribune gave the film four stars out of four, writing that Nicholson "continues his impressive string of performances" and that the screenplay "is both funny and wise. It captures all the silliness, stupidity, and veiled warmth of men in groups." He ranked it second (behind Day for Night) on his list of the best films of the year. Charles Champlin of the Los Angeles Times called it "a superior piece of film-making whose superlative acting, corrosive joking and dead-accurate feeling for time and milieu may well transcend its messages of hopelessness and innocence lost. But it is a downer, ferociously so."

In contrast, Gary Arnold of The Washington Post wrote in a generally negative review that "it's conceivable that this trim, foreshortened adaptation would have worked, if only the direction had been sharper. Unfortunately, Ashby has directed as if he were a novice, unsure of camera placement and lighting and undecided about what pace the story needs and what feelings it should evoke." Andrew Sarris, however, praised Ashby's "sensitive, precise direction". Time magazine's Richard Schickel wrote: "There is an unpretentious realism in Towne's script, and director Ashby handles his camera with a simplicity reminiscent of the way American directors treated lower-depths material in the '30s".

It was shown as part of the Cannes Classics section of the 2013 Cannes Film Festival. Paul Tatara largely credited Towne's "profane, heartbreaking script" for the film's "small details, colorful language, and utterly believable character development, which cumulatively pack a real emotional wallop."

On the review aggregator website Rotten Tomatoes, 87% of 39 critics' reviews are positive, with an average rating of 8.1/10. The website's consensus reads: "Very profane, very funny, very '70s: Director Hal Ashby lets Jack Nicholson and the cast run loose, creating a unique dramedy that's far out to sea." Metacritic, which uses a weighted average, assigned the film a score of 86 out of 100, based on 16 critics, indicating "universal acclaim".

== Awards and nominations ==
Nicholson was disappointed that he failed to win an Oscar for his performance: "I like the idea of winning at Cannes with The Last Detail, but not getting our own Academy Award hurt real bad. I did it in that movie, that was my best role".

Year	Institution	Category	Nominee(s)	Result	Ref.
1974	Academy Awards	Best Actor	Jack Nicholson	Nominated	
1974	Academy Awards	Best Supporting Actor	Randy Quaid	Nominated	
1974	Academy Awards	Best Adapted Screenplay	Robert Towne	Nominated	
1975	BAFTA Awards (Note: The film premiered in 1974 in the UK.)	Best Film	Gerald Ayres	Nominated	
1975	BAFTA Awards	Best Actor	Jack Nicholson	Won (Note: Shared the award win with their work for Chinatown.)	
1975	BAFTA Awards	Best Supporting Actor	Randy Quaid	Nominated	
1975	BAFTA Awards	Best Screenplay	Robert Towne	Won	
1974	Cannes Film Festival	Palme d'Or	Hal Ashby	Nominated	
1974	Cannes Film Festival	Best Actor	Jack Nicholson	Won	
1974	Golden Globe Awards	Best Actor	Jack Nicholson	Nominated	
1974	Golden Globe Awards	Best Supporting Actor	Randy Quaid	Nominated	
1974	National Board of Review Awards (Note: Despite premiering in December 1973, the film was eligible during the 1974 calendar year of critics awards.)	Top 10 Films	—N/a	Recipient	
1975	National Society of Film Critics Awards	Best Actor	Jack Nicholson	Won	
1975	New York Film Critics Circle Awards	Best Actor	Jack Nicholson	Won	
1974	Writers Guild of America Awards	Best Adapted Screenplay	Robert Towne	Nominated	

== Unofficial sequel ==
In 2006, filmmaker Richard Linklater expressed an interest in adapting Last Flag Flying, a sequel to The Last Detail, into a film. In the novel, Buddusky runs a bar and is reunited with Larry Meadows after his son is killed in the Iraq War. Linklater's adaptation, which he co-wrote with Ponicsan, was released in November 2017 and stars Bryan Cranston, Laurence Fishburne, and Steve Carell.

== See also ==
- List of American films of 1973

== Bibliography ==
- Biskind, Peter (1998). Easy Riders, Raging Bulls. New York: Simon & Schuster. ISBN 978-0-6848-5708-4.
- Dawson, Nick (2009). Being Hal Ashby: Life of a Hollywood Rebel. Lexington: University Press of Kentucky. doi:10.5810/kentucky/9780813125381.001.0001. ISBN 978-0-8131-2538-1.
- Wiley, Mason; Bona, Damien (1996). Inside Oscar. New York: Ballantine. ISBN 978-0-3454-0053-6.
