= Chinatown (1974 film) =

1974 film by Roman Polanski

- Theatrical release poster by Jim Pearsall
- Directed by: Roman Polanski
- Written by: Robert Towne; Roman Polanski (Note: Uncredited)
- Produced by: Robert Evans
- Starring: Jack Nicholson; Faye Dunaway; John Hillerman; Perry Lopez; Burt Young; John Huston
- Cinematography: John A. Alonzo
- Edited by: Sam O'Steen
- Music by: Jerry Goldsmith
- Production companies: Long Road Productions; Robert Evans Company
- Distributed by: Paramount Pictures
- Release date: June 20, 1974
- Running time: 130 minutes
- Country: United States
- Language: English
- Budget: $6 million
- Box office: $46.2 million

Chinatown is a 1974 American neo-noir mystery film directed by Roman Polanski and written by Robert Towne. It stars Jack Nicholson and Faye Dunaway, with supporting performances from John Huston, John Hillerman, Perry Lopez, Burt Young, Joe Mantell, Bruce Glover, James Hong and Diane Ladd. The film's story is inspired by the California water wars which were a series of disputes over Southern California water at the beginning of the 20th century that resulted in Los Angeles securing water rights in the Owens Valley. Produced by Robert Evans and distributed by Paramount Pictures, Chinatown was Polanski's final film made in the United States.

Released on June 20, 1974, the film received critical acclaim, with praise for the narrative and screenwriting, Nicholson and Dunaway's performances, cinematography, and Polanski's direction. Chinatown led the 47th Academy Awards with 11 nominations, including Best Picture, Best Director (Polanski), Best Actor (Nicholson), and Best Actress (Dunaway), with Towne winning for Best Original Screenplay. At the 32nd Golden Globe Awards, the film won 4 awards, including Best Motion Picture – Drama, Best Director and Best Actor – Motion Picture Drama (Nicholson). It also received 11 nominations at the 28th British Academy Film Awards, including Best Film, and won 3 awards: Best Direction (Polanski), Best Screenplay (Towne, who was also recognized at the same event for his screenplay for The Last Detail) and Best Actor in a Leading Role (Nicholson).

In 2008, the American Film Institute ranked Chinatown #2 on its list of the top ten mystery films. In 1991, it was selected for preservation in the United States National Film Registry by the Library of Congress for being "culturally, historically, or aesthetically significant." It is widely regarded as one of the greatest films ever made.

A sequel, The Two Jakes, was released in 1990, again starring Nicholson, who also directed, with Robert Towne returning to write the screenplay. The film failed to match the acclaim of its predecessor.

== Plot ==
In 1937 Los Angeles, a woman identifying herself as Evelyn Mulwray hires private investigator J. J. "Jake" Gittes to trail her husband, Hollis, the chief engineer at the Department of Water and Power. Gittes photographs Hollis in the company of a young woman and the pictures make their way into the Post-Record, exposing their apparent affair. Gittes is then confronted by the real Evelyn Mulwray, who threatens to sue him. He concludes that the impostor was using him to discredit Hollis.

Gittes crosses paths with his former colleague, LAPD Lieutenant Lou Escobar, when Hollis's corpse is found in a reservoir. Investigating further, he discovers that huge quantities of water are being released from the reservoir each night, despite the fact that the city is in the midst of a drought. Water Department Security Chief Claude Mulvihill warns him off, and he has his nose slashed by one of Mulvihill's henchmen.

Gittes receives a call from Ida Sessions, the woman who posed as Evelyn. She refuses to say who hired her, but urges Gittes to check the Post-Record's obituary section. Now working for Evelyn, Gittes investigates Hollis's death. He learns that Hollis was once the business partner of Evelyn's wealthy father, Noah Cross. Cross offers to double Gittes's fee if he finds Hollis's supposed mistress, who has disappeared.

Public records reveal that much of the Northwest Valley has recently changed ownership. Gittes recognizes one of the buyers' names from the obituary section; the obituary indicates that he had been dead for a week when the deal was closed. Gittes and Evelyn bluff their way into the retirement home where the buyer had lived and discover that many of the other residents are "buyers" too, although they have no knowledge of this fact. A suspicious staff member calls Mulvihill, but Gittes and Evelyn escape him and his thugs and hide at her mansion, where they sleep together. Later that night, Gittes follows Evelyn to a house where he sees her comforting the missing girl. When confronted, Evelyn claims the girl is her sister, Katherine.

A call from Escobar summons Gittes to Ida's apartment; she has been murdered. Escobar reveals that Hollis had saltwater in his lungs, indicating that he did not drown in the reservoir. He suspects Evelyn is responsible for her husband's murder and tells Gittes to produce her quickly. At the Mulwray residence, Gittes retrieves a pair of bifocals from the saltwater garden pond.

Gittes confronts Evelyn about both Katherine, who she now claims is her daughter, and her husband, whom she denies murdering. Frustrated, he repeatedly slaps Evelyn until she breaks down and reveals that Katherine is both her sister and daughter; the girl's father is Cross, who impregnated Evelyn when she was 15. She tells Gittes that the glasses he found did not belong to Hollis, because he did not wear bifocals.

Gittes arranges for the women to flee to Mexico and instructs Evelyn to meet him at her butler's home in Chinatown. He summons Cross to the Mulwray estate, having deduced that Cross dropped his bifocals when he drowned Hollis in the pond. Cross reveals that he is behind both the water shortage and the land grab in the Northwest Valley. Once the land is his, he will obtain a contract from the city to build a reservoir there. He discredited and killed Hollis when the latter came close to uncovering the scheme.

Cross has Mulvihill take the glasses from Gittes at gunpoint. Gittes is then forced to drive them to the rendezvous in Chinatown, where the police are waiting. Escobar detains Gittes as Cross attempts to claim Katherine. Evelyn shoots Cross in the arm and tries to escape with Katherine, but the police open fire, killing her. Cross takes a distraught Katherine away, and Escobar orders Gittes released. As Gittes is led away by his associates, one tells him, "Forget it, Jake. It's Chinatown." (Note: The film title and the oft-quoted line "Forget it, Jake, it's Chinatown," almost certainly refer to "Old Chinatown", or at least the popular perception thereof. Old Chinatown was gradually demolished, starting in 1933, to allow for construction of Union Station, with the grand opening of "New Chinatown" in 1938.)

== Cast ==
- Jack Nicholson as J. J. "Jake" Gittes
- Faye Dunaway as Evelyn Cross-Mulwray
- John Huston as Noah Cross
- Perry Lopez as Lou Escobar
- John Hillerman as Russ Yelburton
- Burt Young as Curly
- Darrell Zwerling as Hollis I. Mulwray
- Diane Ladd as Ida Sessions
- Roy Jenson as Claude Mulvihill
- Roman Polanski as Man with knife
- Dick Bakalyan as Loach
- Joe Mantell as Lawrence Walsh
- Bruce Glover as Duffy
- Nandu Hinds as Sophie
- James O'Reare as lawyer
- James Hong as Kahn
- Beulah Quo as Maid
- Jerry Fujikawa as Gardener
- Belinda Palmer as Katherine Cross
- Roy Roberts as Mayor Bagby
- Noble Willingham as Councilman
- Rance Howard as Irate farmer
- Elizabeth Harding as Curly's wife
- Paul Jenkins, Lee de Broux, and Bob Golden as policemen

== Production ==
=== Background ===
In 1971, producer Robert Evans offered Towne $175,000 to write a screenplay for The Great Gatsby (1974), but Towne felt he could not better F. Scott Fitzgerald's novel. Instead, Towne asked Evans for $25,000 to write his own story, Chinatown, to which Evans agreed. Towne had originally hoped to also direct Chinatown, but realized that by taking Evans' money, he would lose control of the project's future and his role as a director.

Chinatown is set in 1937 and portrays the manipulation of a critical municipal resource—water—by a cadre of shadowy oligarchs. It was the first part of Towne's planned trilogy about the character J. J. Gittes, the foibles of the Los Angeles power structure, and the subjugation of public good by private greed. The second part, The Two Jakes, has Gittes caught up in another grab for a natural resource—oil—in the 1940s. It was directed by Jack Nicholson and released in 1990, but the second film's commercial and critical failure scuttled plans to make Gittes vs. Gittes, about the third finite resource—land—in Los Angeles, circa 1968.

=== Origins ===
The character of Hollis Mulwray was inspired by and loosely based on Irish immigrant William Mulholland (1855–1935) according to Mulholland's granddaughter. Mulholland was the superintendent and chief engineer of the Los Angeles Department of Water and Power, who oversaw the construction of the aqueduct that carries water from the Owens Valley to Los Angeles. Mulholland was considered by many to be the man who made Los Angeles possible by building the Los Angeles Aqueduct in the early 1900s. The 233-mile-long (375 km) feat of engineering brought the water necessary for urban expansion from the Owens Valley to Los Angeles, whose growth was constrained by the limits of the Los Angeles River. Mulholland credited Fred Eaton, then mayor of Los Angeles, with the idea to secure water for the city from the Owens Valley.

Although the character of Hollis Mulwray was relatively minor in the film and he was killed in the early part of the movie, the events of Mulholland's life were portrayed through both the character of Mulwray and other figures in the movie. This portrayal, along with other changes to actual events that inspired Chinatown, such as the time frame which was some thirty years earlier than that of the movie, were some of the liberties with facts of Mulholland's life that the movie takes.

Author Vincent Brook considers real-life Mulholland to be split, in the film, into "noble Water and Power chief Hollis Mulwray" and "mobster muscle Claude Mulvihill", just as Land syndicate and Combination members, who "exploited their insider knowledge" on account of "personal greed", are "condensed into the singular, and singularly monstrous, Noah Cross".

In the film, Mulwray opposes the dam wanted by Noah Cross and the city of Los Angeles for reasons of engineering and safety, arguing he would not repeat his previous mistake, when his dam broke, resulting in hundreds of deaths. This alludes to the St. Francis Dam disaster of March 12, 1928. Unlike the character of Mulwray, who was concerned about the dam in Chinatown, Mulholland's role in the disaster diverged from the events in the film. Mulholland had inspected the St. Francis Dam after the dam keeper Tony Harnischfeger requested it, when Harnischfeger became concerned about the safety of the dam upon discovering cracks and brown water leaking from its base, which indicated to him the erosion of the dam's foundation. Mulholland inspected the dam at around 10:30 in the morning, declaring that all was well with the structure. Just before midnight that same evening, a massive failure of the dam occurred. The dam's failure inundated the Santa Clara River Valley, including the town of Santa Paula, with flood water, causing the deaths of at least 431 people. The event effectively ended Mulholland's career.

The plot of Chinatown is also drawn from another event. In the movie, water is being purposely released in order to drive the land owners out and create support for a dam through an artificial drought. The event that the movie refers to occurred in late 1903 and 1904 when underground water levels plummeted and water usage rose precipitously. Rather than a deliberate release, Mulholland was able to figure out that because of faulty valves and gates in the water system, large quantities of water were being released in the overflow sewer system and then into the ocean. Mulholland was able to stop the leaks.

=== Script ===
According to Robert Towne, both Carey McWilliams's Southern California Country: An Island on the Land (1946) and a West magazine article called "Raymond Chandler's L.A." inspired his original screenplay. In a letter to McWilliams, Towne wrote that Southern California Country "really changed my life. It taught me to look at the place where I was born, and convinced me to write about it".

Towne wrote the screenplay with Jack Nicholson in mind. He took the title (and the exchange "What did you do in Chinatown?" / "As little as possible") from a Hungarian vice cop, who had worked in Los Angeles's Chinatown, dealing with its confusion of dialects and gangs. The vice cop thought that "police were better off in Chinatown doing nothing, because you could never tell what went on there" and whether what a cop did helped victims or further exploited them.

Polanski first learned of the script through Nicholson, as they had been searching for a suitable joint project, and the producer Robert Evans was excited at the thought that Polanski's direction would create a darker, more cynical, and European vision of the United States. Polanski was initially reluctant to return to Los Angeles (it was only a few years since the murder of his pregnant wife Sharon Tate), but was persuaded on the strength of the script.

Towne wanted Cross to die and Evelyn Mulwray to survive, but the screenwriter and director argued over it, with Polanski insisting on a tragic end: "I knew that if Chinatown was to be special, not just another thriller where the good guys triumph in the final reel, Evelyn had to die". They parted ways over this dispute and Polanski wrote the final scene a few days before it was shot.

The original script was more than 180 pages and included a narration by Gittes; Polanski cut and reordered the story so the audience and Gittes unraveled the mysteries at the same time.

According to Sam Wasson's The Big Goodbye: Chinatown and the Last Years of Hollywood, Towne "secretly employed an old college friend named Edward Taylor as his uncredited writing partner for more than 40 years." (Taylor died in 2013).

=== Characters and casting ===
- J. J. Gittes was named after Nicholson's friend, producer Harry Gittes.
- Evelyn Mulwray is, according to Towne, intended to initially seem the classic "black widow" character typical of lead female characters in film noir, but is eventually revealed to be a tragic victim. Jane Fonda was strongly considered for the role, but Polanski insisted on Dunaway.
- Noah Cross: Towne said that Huston was, after Nicholson, the second-best-cast actor in the film and that he made the Cross character menacing, through his courtly performance.
- Polanski appears in a cameo as the gangster who cuts Gittes' nose. The effect was accomplished with a special knife which could have actually cut Nicholson's nose if Polanski had not held it correctly.
- In 1974, after making Chinatown and while filming The Fortune, Nicholson was informed by Time magazine researchers that his "sister" was actually his mother, similarly to the revelation made in the film regarding Evelyn and Katherine.

=== Filming ===
The Los Angeles of Chinatown

Principal photography took place from October 1973 to January 1974. William A. Fraker accepted the cinematographer position from Polanski when Paramount agreed. He had worked with the studio previously on Polanski's Rosemary's Baby. Robert Evans, never consulted about the decision, insisted that the offer be rescinded since he felt pairing Polanski and Fraker again would create a team with too much control over the project and complicate the production.

Between Fraker and the eventual choice John A. Alonzo, the two compromised on Stanley Cortez, but Polanski grew frustrated with Cortez's slow process, old fashioned compositional sensibility, and unfamiliarity with the Panavision equipment. Alonzo had worked on documentaries and shot film for National Geographic and for Jacques Cousteau. Alonzo was chosen for his fleetness and skill with natural light a few weeks into production. Alonzo understood that Polanski wanted realism in his lighting; "He wants the soft red tile to look soft red." Ultimately, only a handful of scenes in the finished film, including the orange grove confrontation, were shot by Cortez. Because Polanski's English was poor, Alonzo and Polanski would communicate in Italian, which Alonzo would then translate for the crew. Polanski was rigorous in his framing and use of Alonzo's vision, making the actors strictly adhere to blocking to accommodate the camera and lighting.

=== Soundtrack ===
Chinatown

Film score by Jerry Goldsmith
- Released: 1974
- Genres: Jazz, soundtrack
- Label: Varèse Sarabande

Jerry Goldsmith composed and recorded the film's score in ten days, after producer Robert Evans rejected Phillip Lambro's original effort at the last minute. It received an Academy Award nomination and remains widely praised, ranking ninth on the American Film Institute's list of the top 25 American film scores. Goldsmith's score, with "haunting" trumpet solos by Hollywood studio musician and MGM's first trumpet Uan Rasey, was released through ABC Records and features 12 tracks at a running time just over 30 minutes. It was later reissued on CD by the Varèse Sarabande label. Rasey related that Goldsmith "told [him] to play it sexy — but like it's not good sex!"

1. "Love Theme from Chinatown (Main Title)"
2. "Noah Cross"
3. "Easy Living" (Rainger, Robin)
4. "Jake and Evelyn"
5. "I Can't Get Started" (Duke, Gershwin)
6. "The Last of Ida"
7. "The Captive"
8. "The Boy on a Horse"
9. "The Way You Look Tonight" (Kern, Fields)
10. "The Wrong Clue"
11. "J. J. Gittes"
12. "Love Theme from Chinatown (End Title)"

== Historical background ==
In his 2004 film essay and documentary Los Angeles Plays Itself, film scholar Thom Andersen lays out the complex relationship between Chinatown's script and its historical background,

Chinatown isn't a docudrama, it's a fiction. The water project it depicts isn't the construction of the Los Angeles Aqueduct, engineered by William Mulholland before the First World War. Chinatown is set in 1937, not 1905. The Mulholland-like figure—"Hollis Mulwray"—isn't the chief architect of the project, but rather its strongest opponent, who must be discredited and murdered. Mulwray is against the "Alto Vallejo Dam" because it's unsafe, not because it's stealing water from somebody else... But there are echoes of Mulholland's aqueduct project in Chinatown... Mulholland's project enriched its promoters through insider land deals in the San Fernando Valley, just like the dam project in Chinatown. The disgruntled San Fernando Valley farmers of Chinatown, forced to sell off their land at bargain prices because of an artificial drought, seem like stand-ins for the Owens Valley settlers whose homesteads turned to dust when Los Angeles took the water that irrigated them. The "Van Der Lip Dam" disaster, which Hollis Mulwray cites to explain his opposition to the proposed dam, is an obvious reference to the collapse of the Saint Francis Dam in 1928. Mulholland built this dam after completing the aqueduct and its failure was the greatest man-made disaster in the history of California. These echoes have led many viewers to regard Chinatown, not only as docudrama, but as truth—the real secret history of how Los Angeles got its water. And it has become a ruling metaphor of the non-fictional critiques of Los Angeles development.

== Themes ==
Chinatown is widely regarded as a defining example of neo-noir, emphasizing themes of moral ambiguity, corruption, and fatalism. The film portrays Los Angeles as a setting in which powerful institutions operate beyond the reach of justice, particularly through its depiction of water rights manipulation and political influence. Unlike many classic film noir works of the 1940s, the narrative offers no moral resolution, culminating in a bleak ending in which the protagonist is unable to prevent injustice.

Scholars have also noted that the film complicates the traditional femme fatale archetype through the character of Evelyn Mulwray, who initially appears deceptive but is ultimately revealed as a victim of abuse and patriarchal power. This subversion reflects broader shifts in 1970s American cinema and reinforces the film’s pessimistic worldview, solidifying its status as a key work in the neo-noir revival.

== Analysis and interpretation ==
In a 1975 issue of Film Quarterly, Wayne D. McGinnis compared Chinatown to Oedipus Rex by Sophocles. He suggested that a "wasteland motif predominates in both works", in which a character (Noah Cross in Chinatown and Oedipus in Oedipus Rex) uses "a plague on a city" to get into public power and then harbor corruption. McGinnis wrote that both works allude to "a sterility of moral values in its own era": of Athens in "a time of intellectual upheaval [...] after the heroic battle of Marathon" in Oedipus Rex and of America in the Watergate era in Chinatown. He also argued that in the film, director Roman Polanski splits Sophocles' Oedipus into two morally polar figures, with the film's protagonist Detective Jake Gittes paralleling the "good" Oedipus: the one uncovering the source of corruption. McGinnis asserted that after "confronting the web of evil perpetrated by Cross [...] Gittes is the Oedipus whose success, to the use the words of Cleanth Brooks and Robert B. Heilman, 'has tended to blind [him] to possibilities which pure reason fails to see'". McGinnis concluded that "There is finally pity for the doomed, ignorant Gittes, just as there is pity for the blind Oedipus in Sophocles", however, "Gittes' real sight, like Oedipus, comes too late".

== Reception ==
=== Box office ===
Chinatown was released in the United States on June 21, 1974, by Paramount Pictures. The film grossed approximately $29.2 million domestically, with an additional $28,149 earned in international markets, resulting in a worldwide total of $29.23 million.

Adjusted for inflation, Chinatown's domestic gross is estimated to be approximately $146 million in 2022 dollars.

=== Critical response ===
On Rotten Tomatoes, Chinatown holds an approval rating of 98% based on 147 reviews, with an average rating of 9.40/10. The website's critical consensus reads, "As bruised and cynical as the decade that produced it, this noir classic benefits from Robert Towne's brilliant screenplay, director Roman Polanski's steady hand, and wonderful performances from Jack Nicholson and Faye Dunaway". Metacritic assigned the film a weighted average score of 92 out of 100, based on 23 critics, indicating "universal acclaim". Roger Ebert added it to his "Great Movies" list, saying that Nicholson's performance was "key in keeping Chinatown from becoming just a genre crime picture", along with Towne's screenplay, concluding that the film "seems to settle easily beside the original noirs".

Peter Bradshaw of The Guardian calls the dialogue "crackling" and "superb" and says Polanski "brilliantly shows that money and power are not what’s motivating everyone after all". Writing for the Empire, Rob Fraser praises the movie as "the best private eye movie ever made" and is "a timeless classic".

Cineluxe's Michael Gaughn calls some of the casting questionable but says the film is Polanski's "best work" and praises the cinematography. Gaughn does criticize the black levels that made "many of the scenes in the first half looking almost monochrome or, at best, like hand-tinted postcards".

Vincent Canby from The New York Times praises the performances and plot of the film but noted that Polanksi and Towne "have attempted nothing so witty and entertaining, being content instead to make a competently stylish, more or less thirties-ish movie".

=== Accolades ===
Award	Category	Nominee(s)	Result	Ref.
Academy Awards	Best Picture	Robert Evans	Nominated	
Academy Awards	Best Director	Roman Polanski	Nominated	
Academy Awards	Best Actor	Jack Nicholson	Nominated	
Academy Awards	Best Actress	Faye Dunaway	Nominated	
Academy Awards	Best Original Screenplay	Robert Towne	Won	
Academy Awards	Best Production Design	Richard Sylbert, W. Stewart Campbell, Ruby R. Levitt	Nominated	
Academy Awards	Best Cinematography	John A. Alonzo	Nominated	
Academy Awards	Best Costume Design	Anthea Sylbert	Nominated	
Academy Awards	Best Film Editing	Sam O'Steen	Nominated	
Academy Awards	Best Original Dramatic Score	Jerry Goldsmith	Nominated	
Academy Awards	Best Sound	Charles Grenzbach and Larry Jost	Nominated	
Bodil Awards	Best Non-European Film	Roman Polanski	Won	
British Academy Film Awards	Best Film	Roman Polanski	Nominated	
British Academy Film Awards	Best Direction	Roman Polanski	Won	
British Academy Film Awards	Best Actor in a Leading Role	Jack Nicholson (also for The Last Detail)	Won	
British Academy Film Awards	Best Actress in a Leading Role	Faye Dunaway	Nominated	
British Academy Film Awards	Best Actor in a Supporting Role	John Huston	Nominated	
British Academy Film Awards	Best Screenplay	Robert Towne (also for The Last Detail)	Won	
British Academy Film Awards	Best Art Direction	Richard Sylbert	Nominated	
British Academy Film Awards	Best Cinematography	John A. Alonzo	Nominated	
British Academy Film Awards	Best Costume Design	Anthea Sylbert	Nominated	
British Academy Film Awards	Best Film Editing	Sam O'Steen	Nominated	
British Academy Film Awards	Best Original Music	Jerry Goldsmith	Nominated	
Directors Guild of America Awards	Outstanding Directorial Achievement in Motion Pictures	Roman Polanski	Nominated	
Edgar Allan Poe Awards	Best Motion Picture	Robert Towne	Won	
Fotogramas de Plata	Best Foreign Movie Performer	Jack Nicholson (also for Five Easy Pieces)	Won	
Golden Globe Awards	Best Motion Picture – Drama		Won	
Golden Globe Awards	Best Actor in a Motion Picture – Drama	Jack Nicholson	Won	
Golden Globe Awards	Best Actress in a Motion Picture – Drama	Faye Dunaway	Nominated	
Golden Globe Awards	Best Supporting Actor – Motion Picture	John Huston	Nominated	
Golden Globe Awards	Best Director – Motion Picture	Roman Polanski	Won	
Golden Globe Awards	Best Screenplay – Motion Picture	Robert Towne	Won	
Golden Globe Awards	Best Original Score – Motion Picture	Jerry Goldsmith	Nominated	
International Film Music Critics Awards	Best Re-Release/Re-Recording of an Existing Score	Jerry Goldsmith, Douglass Fake, Roger Feigelson, Jeff Bond, and Joe Sikoryak	Nominated	
Kansas City Film Critics Circle Awards	Best Actor	Jack Nicholson	Won	
Kansas City Film Critics Circle Awards	Best Supporting Actor	John Huston	Won	
National Board of Review Awards	Top Ten Films		3rd Place	
National Film Preservation Board	National Film Registry		Inducted	
National Society of Film Critics Awards	Best Actor	Jack Nicholson (also for The Last Detail)	Won	
New York Film Critics Circle Awards	Best Actor	Jack Nicholson (also for The Last Detail)	Won	
New York Film Critics Circle Awards	Best Screenplay	Robert Towne	Runner-up	
Online Film & Television Association Awards	Hall of Fame – Motion Picture		Inducted	
Producers Guild of America Awards	PGA Hall of Fame – Motion Pictures	Robert Evans	Won	
Sant Jordi Awards	Best Foreign Film	Roman Polanski	Won	
Writers Guild of America Awards	Best Drama – Written Directly for the Screen	Robert Towne	Won	

=== Other honors ===
- 2010 – Best film of all time, The Guardian
- 2012 – In the British Film Institute's 2012 Sight & Sound polls of the greatest films ever made, Chinatown was 78th among critics and 91st among directors.
- 2015 – The film ranked 12th on BBC's "100 Greatest American Films" list, voted on by film critics from around the world.

American Film Institute recognition

- 1998 – AFI's 100 Years...100 Movies – Ranked 19th
- 2001 – AFI's 100 Years...100 Thrills – Ranked 16th
- 2003 – AFI's 100 Years...100 Heroes and Villains:
  - Noah Cross – Ranked 16th Villain
  - J.J. Gittes – Nominated Hero
- 2005 – AFI's 100 Years...100 Movie Quotes:
  - "Forget it, Jake, it's Chinatown" – Ranked 74th
- 2005 – AFI's 100 Years of Film Scores – Ranked 9th
- 2007 – AFI's 100 Years...100 Movies (10th Anniversary Edition) – Ranked 21st
- 2008 – AFI's 10 Top 10 mystery film – Ranked 2nd

== Subsequent works ==
A sequel film, The Two Jakes, was released in 1990, again starring Nicholson, who also directed, with Robert Towne returning to write the screenplay. It was not met with the same financial or critical success as the first film.

A prequel television series by David Fincher and Towne for Netflix about Gittes starting his agency was reported to be in the works in November 2019.

A film about the making of Chinatown, based on the non-fiction book The Big Goodbye: Chinatown and the Last Years of Hollywood, was reported in August 2020 to be in the works, with Ben Affleck as director and writer.

== Legacy ==
Towne's screenplay has become legendary among critics and filmmakers, often cited as one of the best examples of the craft, though Polanski decided on the fatal final scene. While it has been reported that Towne envisioned a happy ending, he has denied these claims and said simply that he initially found Polanski's ending to be excessively melodramatic. He explained in a 1997 interview: "The way I had seen it was that Evelyn would kill her father but end up in jail for it, unable to give the real reason why it happened. And the detective [Jack Nicholson] couldn't talk about it either, so it was bleak in its own way". Towne retrospectively concluded that "Roman was right", later arguing that Polanski's stark and simple ending, due to the complexity of the events preceding it, was more fitting than his own, which he described as equally bleak but "too complicated and too literary".

Chinatown brought more public awareness to the land dealings and disputes over water rights, which arose while drawing Los Angeles' water supply from the Owens Valley in the 1910s.

== See also ==
- List of American films of 1974

== Bibliography ==
- Eaton, Michael (1998) Chinatown (B.F.I. Film Classics series). Los Angeles: University of California Press. ISBN 0-85170-532-4.
- Standiford, Les (2016). Water to the Angels: William Mulholland, His Monumental Aqueduct, and the Rise of Los Angeles. New York: Ecco, an imprint of HarperCollins Publishers. ISBN 9780062251459.
- Thomson, David (2004). The Whole Equation: A History of Hollywood. New York, New York: Alfred A. Knopf. ISBN 0-375-40016-8.
- Towne, Robert (1997). Chinatown and the Last Detail: 2 Screenplays. New York: Grove Press. ISBN 0-8021-3401-7.
- Tuska, Jon (1978). The Detective in Hollywood. Garden City, New York: Doubleday & Company. ISBN 0-385-12093-1.
- Wasson, Sam (2020). The Big Goodbye. Chinatown and the Last Years of Hollywood, Flatiron Books. ISBN 9781250301826.
