= Lacombe, Lucien =

Lacombe Lucien
- Theatrical poster
- Directed by: Louis Malle
- Screenplay by: Louis Malle; Patrick Modiano
- Produced by: Louis Malle; Claude Nedjar
- Starring: Pierre Blaise; Aurore Clément
- Cinematography: Tonino Delli Colli
- Edited by: Suzanne Baron
- Music by: Django Reinhardt
- Production companies: Nouvelles Éditions de Films; Paramount Pictures; Vides Cinematografica; Hallelujah Film
- Distributed by: Cinema International Corporation (France); Constantin Film (Germany); 20th Century Fox (International)
- Release date: 30 January 1974 (France)
- Running time: 138 minutes
- Countries: France; West Germany; Italy
- Languages: French; German
- Box office: $13.1 million

Lacombe, Lucien (French pronunciation: [lakɔ̃b lysjɛ̃]) is a 1974 French war drama film by Louis Malle about a French teenage boy during the German occupation of France in World War II. It received an Academy Award nomination for Best Foreign Language Film, a Golden Globe nomination for Best Foreign Language Film, and a U.S. National Board of Review award as one of the Top Five International Films of the year.

== Plot ==
In southwestern France in June 1944, as the Allies are fighting the Germans in Normandy, Lucien Lacombe, a 17-year-old country boy, is dissatisfied with his job at a nursing home. He returns to the farm where his mother lives to find a new family in her house, and her moved in with the owner. Looking for a change, he tries to join the Resistance, but Robert Peyssac, the local Resistance leader and his former teacher, turns him down for being too young, as well as not particularly devoted to the cause.

On the way back to the town where he works, Lucien's bicycle gets a flat tire, so he has to walk, and arrives after curfew. He is picked up outside the hotel that serves as the headquarters of the local cell of the Carlingue, the French auxiliaries of the Gestapo, and taken in for questioning. Under the influence of alcohol, he betrays Peyssac, who is brought in and tortured. Seeing that Lucien could be useful, the Carlingue recruit him into their lawless regime of extortion and terror, and the aristocratic Jean-Bernard, in particular, takes Lucien under his wing.

Lucien enjoys his new power and position, but becomes enamored with France Horn, a beautiful French-born Jewish girl living in seclusion with her father Albert, a tailor, and her grandmother Bella, who all fled Paris, and are now trying to cross into neutral Spain. He forces himself into a relationship with France, eventually moving in, and, though his uncouth nature and lack of education stand in stark contrast to the Horns' sophistication and he is not wanted, his presence does provide the Horns some protection. News spreads that the Allies are winning the war, the leader of Lucien's Carlingue cell is killed in a battle, and his mother visits to tell him that she has received threats on his life for becoming a collaborator, but he shrugs this all off.

Albert goes to the Carlingue hotel to see Lucien to discuss his relationship with France man-to-man, and is taken into custody by Faure, a particularly pro-German and anti-Semitic member of the Carlingue, who turns Albert over to the Germans. While Lucien is guarding a maquisard, who he does not like for "talking down" to him, members of the Resistance attack the hotel and kill the few remaining collaborators, though Lucien is uninjured.

Many inhabitants of the town are rounded up in retribution, and Lucien accompanies a German soldier to arrest France and Bella. The soldier keeps Lucien from taking back a pocket watch that Lucien had given Albert, only to take it for himself, leading Lucien to shoot the soldier and run away with the women. Before they reach Spain, their car breaks down, so they travel on foot until they find shelter in a secluded and abandoned farmhouse, and Lucien uses his knowledge to live off the land.

A text epilogue states that Lucien was arrested on October 12, 1944, tried and sentenced to death by a military tribunal of the Resistance, and executed.

== Cast ==
- Pierre Blaise as Lucien Lacombe
- Aurore Clément as France Horn
- Holger Löwenadler as Albert Horn, a Jewish tailor in hiding with his mother and adult daughter
- Therese Giehse as Bella Horn, Albert's mother
- Stéphane Bouy as Jean-Bernard de Voisins, Lucien's aristocratic mentor in the Carlingue
- Luminița Iacobescu as Betty Beaulieu, a film actress dating Jean-Bernard
- René Bouloc as Stéphane Faure, a particularly pro-German member of the Carlingue
- Pierre Decazes as Henri Aubert, a former cycling champion now in the Carlingue
- Jean Rougerie as Pierre "Tonin" Lanciaga, a former police inspector now leading a Carlingue cell
- Cécile Ricard as Marie, the maid at the Hotel des grottes
- Jacqueline Staup as Lucienne Chauvelot, Tonin's secretary
- Ave Ninchi as Madame Georges, Aubert's black marketing partner
- Pierre Saintons as Hippolyte, a black member of the Carlingue
- Gilberte Rivet as Thérèse Lacombe, Lucien's mother
- Jacques Rispal as Raverdy, Horn's landlord
- Jean Bousquet as Robert Peyssac, Lucien's former teacher

== Production ==
Malle wrote the screenplay with novelist Patrick Modiano. Originally titled Le faucon ("The Falcon") and set in present-day Mexico, the story was reworked and given a wartime French setting, as Malle was not allowed to shoot in Mexico (nor in Chile). The rewritten script was titled Le milicien ("The Milice Man").

The film was shot in the Lot and Tarn-et-Garonne departments, specifically in the communes of Figeac, Arcambal, Montauban, and Sénaillac-Lauzès.

== Reception ==
=== Critical response ===
On the review aggregator website Rotten Tomatoes, Lacombe, Lucien has an approval rating of 100% based on 11 critics' reviews, with an average rating of 9.2/10.

Vincent Canby, film critic for The New York Times, gave the film a positive review. He wrote: "Lacombe, Lucien is easily Mr. Malle's most ambitious, most provocative film, and if it is not as immediately affecting as The Fire Within or even the comic Murmur of the Heart, it's because—to make his point—he has centered it on a character who must remain forever mysterious, forever beyond our sympathy."

Pauline Kael wrote of her admiration for Malle's expressive camerawork and visual capabilities, saying that "His technique is to let the story seem to tell itself, while he searches and observes. His gamble is that the cameras will discover what the artist's imagination can't, and, steadily, startlingly, the gamble pays off. [...] Without ever mentioning the subject of innocence and guilt, this extraordinary film, in its calm, dispassionate way, addresses it on a very deep level."

Film critic Dan Schneider liked the film, especially Malle's casting of Blaise. Schneider wrote: "Every so often a director makes an inspiring casting choice to not hire a real actor for a role, but go with an unknown, an amateur. Perhaps the best example of this was in Vittorio De Sica's 1952 film Umberto D. [...] Yet, not that far behind has to be Louis Malle's decision to cast the lead character for his 1974 film, Lacombe, Lucien with an amateur named Pierre Blaise. No actor would likely be able to capture the natural ferality that Blaise brings to the role of a none-too-bright French farm boy who unwittingly, at first, becomes an accomplice and collaborator with the Gestapo in the final months of Vichy France, in late 1944."

Film critic Wheeler Winston Dixon discussed why the film was controversial: "Louis Malle's drama Lacombe, Lucien is one of the most effective films about the capitulation of France to the Nazis during World War II, and one of the most controversial [...] Louis Malle's film was daring for its time for suggesting that not every member of the French public was a member of the Resistance; that indeed, many were willing accomplices to the Vichy government, and the sting of the film remains to this day."

=== Accolades ===
Wins

- 1974: National Board of Review, USA – Best Foreign Films & Best Supporting Actor (Holger Löwenadler)
- 1975: British Academy of Film and Television Arts – Best Film & UN Award
- 1975: French Syndicate of Cinema Critics – Best Film (Louis Malle)
- 1975: National Society of Film Critics, USA – Best Supporting Actor (Holger Löwenadler)

Nominations

- 1975: Academy Awards – Best Foreign Language Film (France)
- 1975: British Academy of Film and Television Arts – Best Direction (Louis Malle); Best Screenplay (Louis Malle and Patrick Modiano)
- 1975: Golden Globes – Best Foreign Film (France)

== See also ==
- List of French submissions for the Academy Award for Best Foreign Language Film
- List of submissions to the 47th Academy Awards for Best Foreign Language Film
- Films dealing with Nazism and sexuality
