= 1974 New York Film Critics Circle Awards =

40th New York Film Critics Circle Awards

40th New York Film Critics Circle Awards

January 26, 1975
(announced January 8, 1975)

Best Picture:
Amarcord

The 40th New York Film Critics Circle Awards, 26 January 1975, honored the best filmmaking of 1974.

== Winners ==
- Best Actor:
  - Jack Nicholson — Chinatown and The Last Detail
  - Runners-up: Gene Hackman — The Conversation and Richard Dreyfuss — The Apprenticeship of Duddy Kravitz
- Best Actress:
  - Liv Ullmann — Scenes from a Marriage (Scener ur ett äktenskap)
  - Runner-up: Gena Rowlands — A Woman Under the Influence
- Best Director:
  - Federico Fellini — Amarcord
  - Runner-up: Ingmar Bergman — Scenes from a Marriage (Scener ur ett äktenskap)
- Best Film:
  - Amarcord
  - Runners-up: Scenes from a Marriage (Scener ur ett äktenskap) and The Godfather Part II
- Best Screenplay:
  - Ingmar Bergman — Scenes from a Marriage (Scener ur ett äktenskap)
  - Runners-up: Robert Towne — Chinatown and Francis Ford Coppola — The Conversation
- Best Supporting Actor:
  - Charles Boyer — Stavisky
  - Runners-up: Robert De Niro — The Godfather Part II and Lee Strasberg — The Godfather Part II
- Best Supporting Actress:
  - Valerie Perrine — Lenny
  - Runners-up: Bibi Andersson — Scenes from a Marriage (Scener ur ett äktenskap) and Madeline Kahn — Young Frankenstein
- Special Award:
  - Fabiano Canosa
