= 1974 National Society of Film Critics Awards =

Annual US film award ceremony

9th NSFC Awards

January 5, 1975

Best Film:
Scenes from a Marriage

The 9th National Society of Film Critics Awards, given on 5 January 1975, honored the best filmmaking of 1974.

== Winners ==
=== Best Picture ===
- Scenes from a Marriage (Scener ur ett äktenskap)

=== Best Director ===
- Francis Ford Coppola – The Godfather Part II and The Conversation
- Runners-up: Ingmar Bergman – Scenes from a Marriage and Federico Fellini – Amarcord

=== Best Actor ===
- Jack Nicholson – Chinatown and The Last Detail

=== Best Actress ===
- Liv Ullmann – Scenes from a Marriage (Scener ur ett äktenskap)

=== Best Supporting Actor ===
- Holger Löwenadler – Lacombe, Lucien

=== Best Supporting Actress ===
- Bibi Andersson – Scenes from a Marriage (Scener ur ett äktenskap)

=== Best Screenplay ===
- Ingmar Bergman – Scenes from a Marriage (Scener ur ett äktenskap)

=== Best Cinematography ===
- Gordon Willis – The Godfather Part II and The Parallax View

=== Special Award ===
- Jean Renoir
