= 32nd Golden Globe Awards =

Film award ceremony in 1975

- Date: January 25, 1975

The 32nd Golden Globe Awards, honoring the best in film and television for 1974, were held on January 25, 1975.

== Winners and nominees ==
The winners are first and in bold followed by the rest of the nominees.

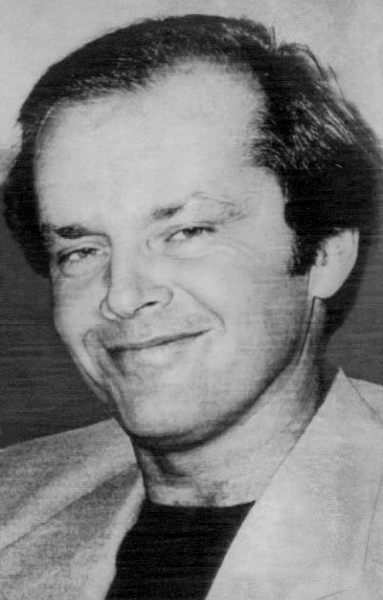
Jack Nicholson — Best Actor in a Motion Picture, Drama winner

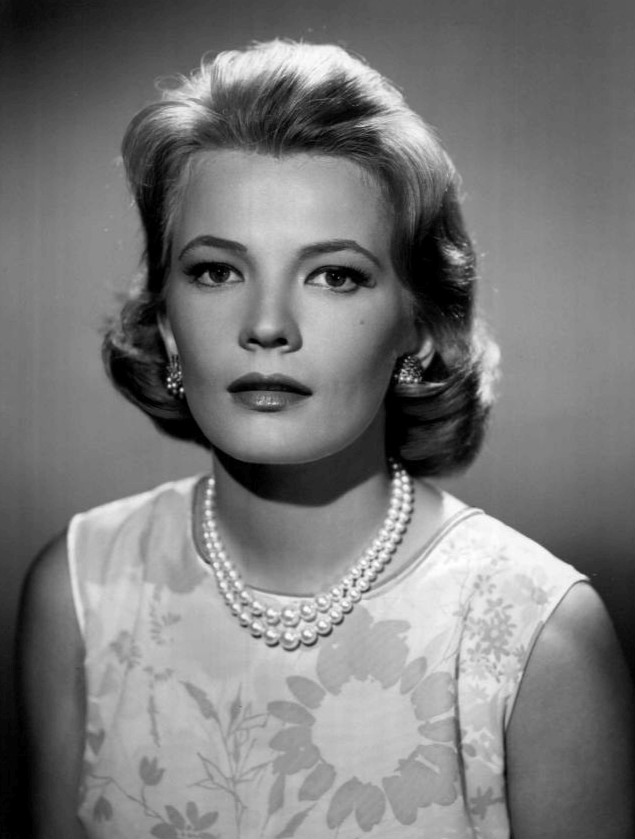
Gena Rowlands — Best Actress in a Motion Picture, Drama winner

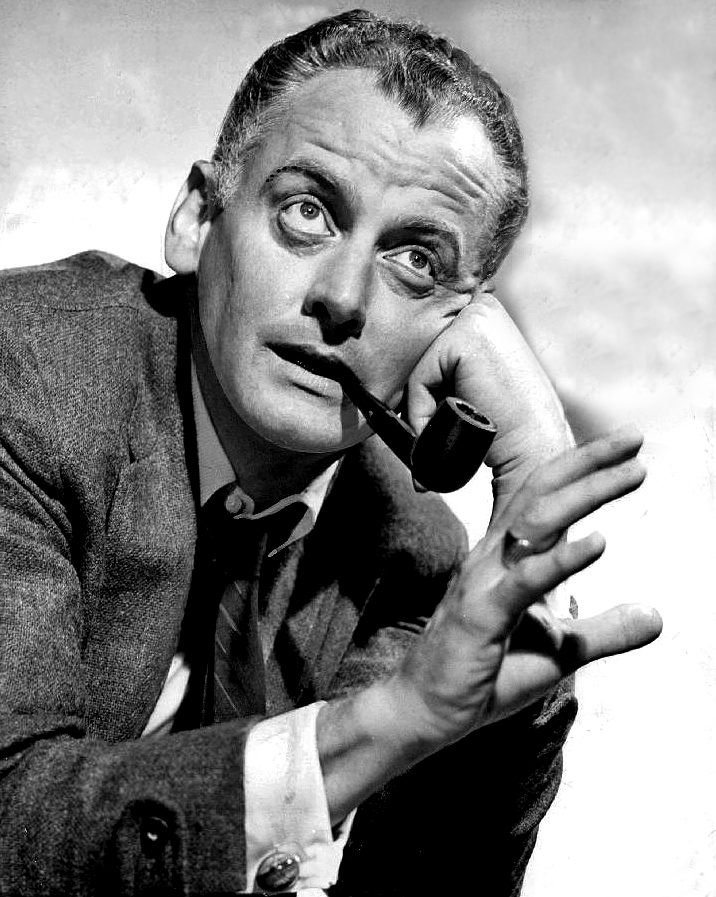
Art Carney — Best Actor in a Motion Picture – Musical or Comedy winner

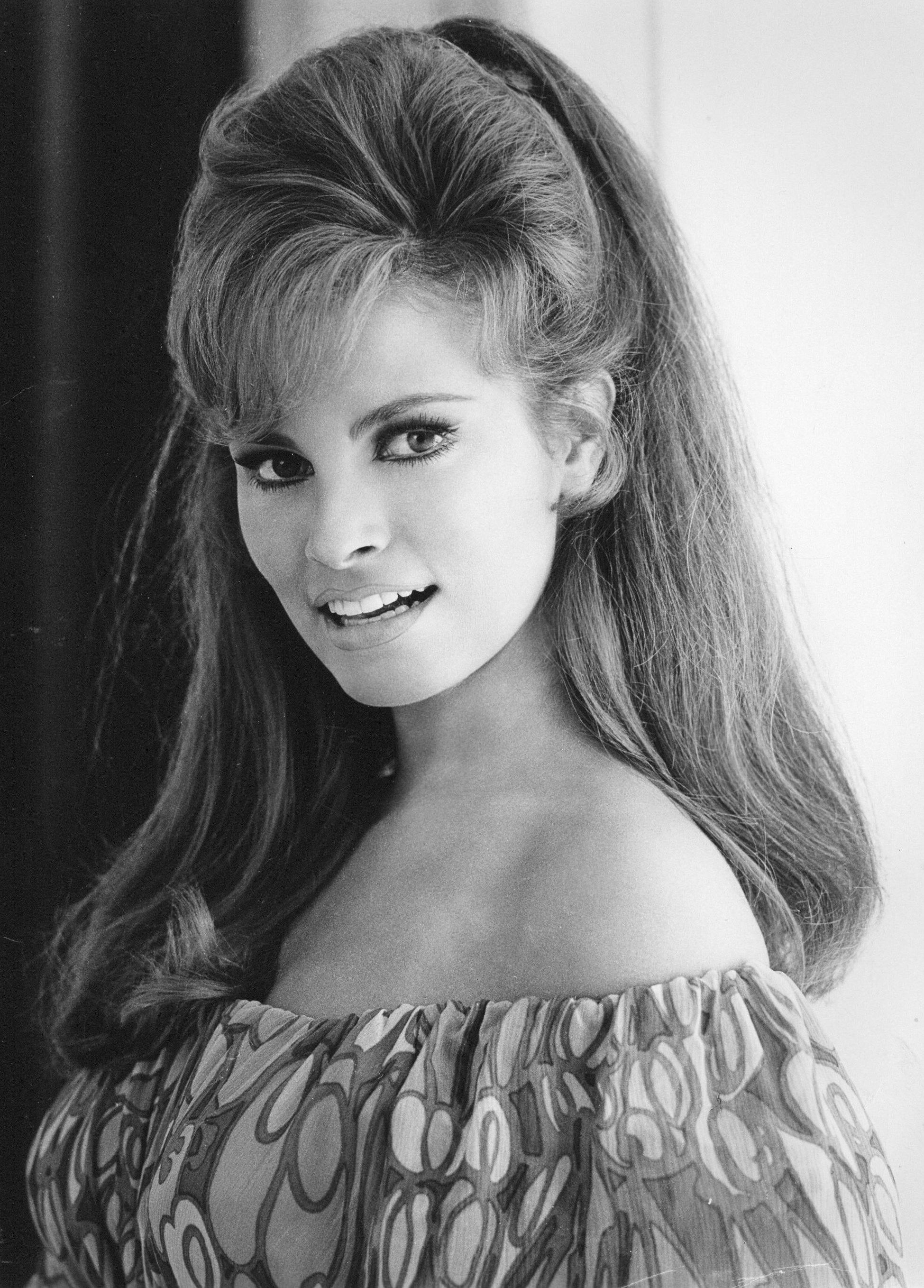
Raquel Welch — Best Actress in a Motion Picture, Comedy or Musical winner

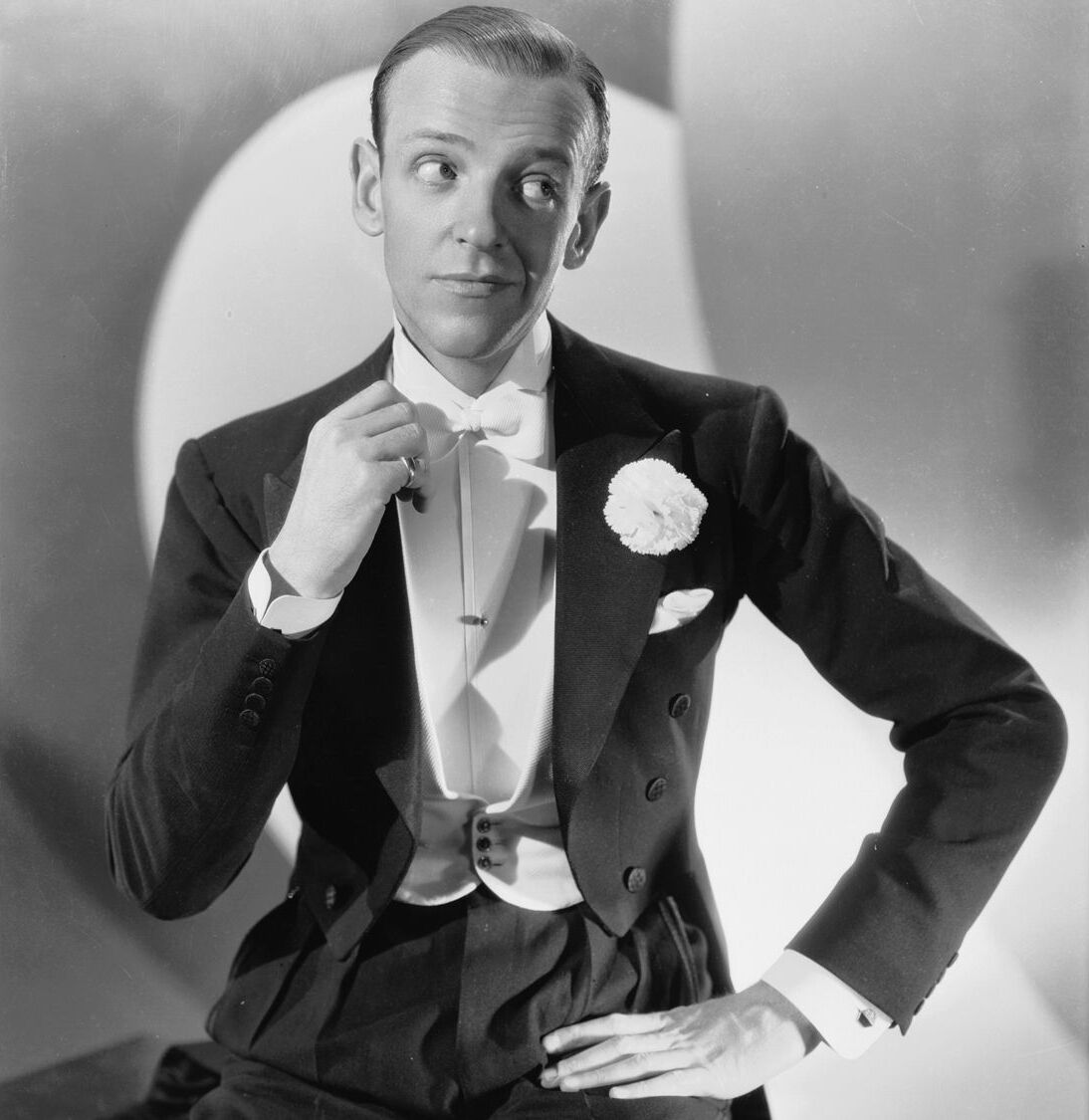
Fred Astaire — Best Supporting Actor in a Motion Picture, winner

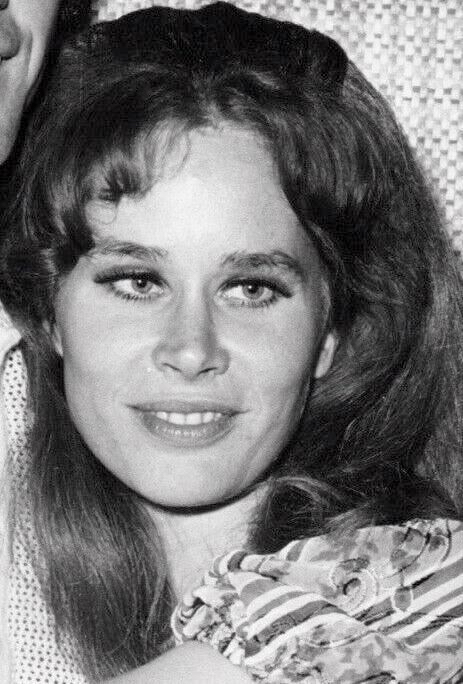
Karen Black — Best Supporting Actress in a Motion Picture, winner

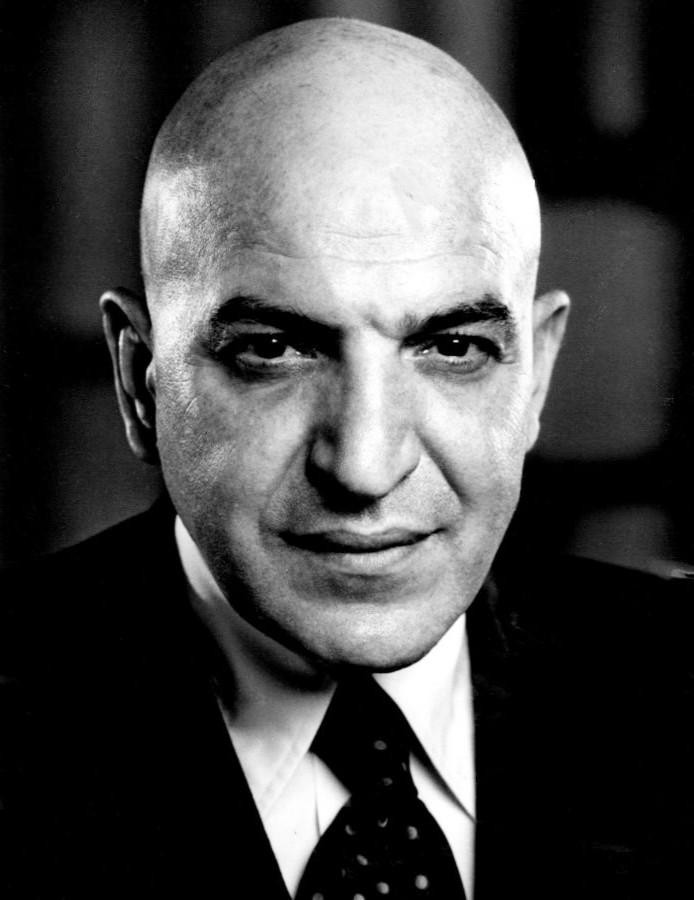
Telly Savalas — Best Actor in a Television Series, Drama winner

Angie Dickinson — Best Actress in a Television Series, Drama winner

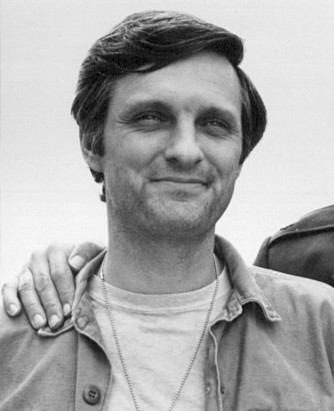
Alan Alda — Best Actor in a Television Series, Comedy or Musical winner

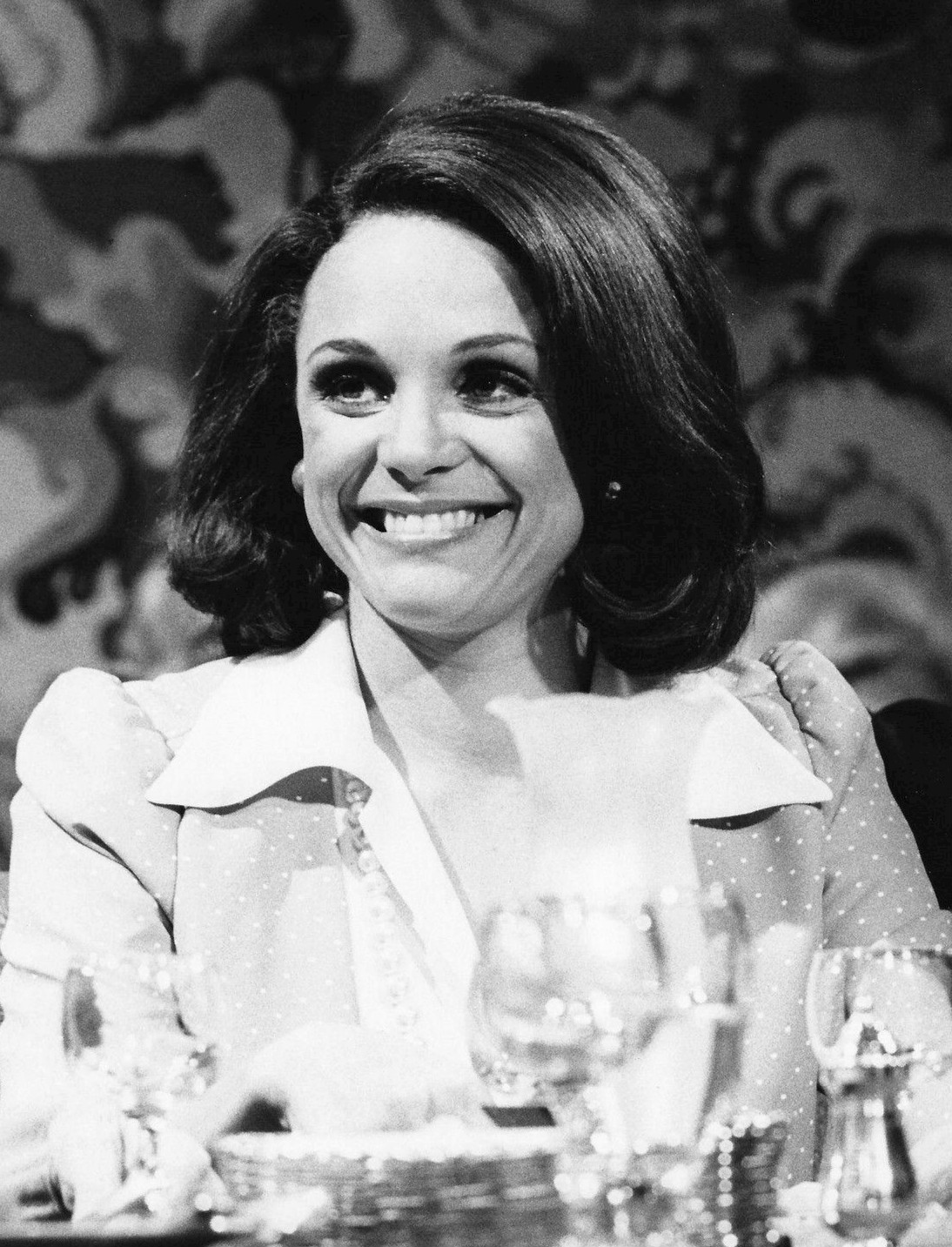
Valerie Harper — Best Actress in a Television Series, Comedy or Musical winner

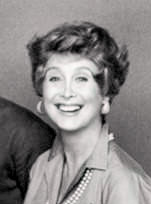
Betty Garrett — Best Supporting Actress in a Series, Miniseries or Television Film winner

=== Film ===
Best Motion Picture
Drama	Comedy or Musical
**Chinatown**; The Conversation; Earthquake; The Godfather Part II; A Woman Under the Influence	**The Longest Yard**; The Front Page; Harry and Tonto; The Little Prince; The Three Musketeers
Best Performance in a Motion Picture – Drama
Actor	Actress
**Jack Nicholson – Chinatown as J.J. "Jake" Gittes**; James Caan – The Gambler as Axel Freed; Gene Hackman – The Conversation as Harry Caul; Dustin Hoffman – Lenny as Lenny Bruce; Al Pacino – The Godfather Part II as Michael Corleone	**Gena Rowlands – A Woman Under the Influence as Mabel Longhetti**; Ellen Burstyn – Alice Doesn't Live Here Anymore as Alice Hyatt; Faye Dunaway – Chinatown as Evelyn Cross Mulwray; Valerie Perrine – Lenny as Honey Bruce; Liv Ullmann – Scenes from a Marriage as Marianne
Best Performance in a Motion Picture – Comedy or Musical
Actor	Actress
**Art Carney – Harry and Tonto as Harry Coombes**; James Earl Jones – Claudine as Rupert Marshall; Jack Lemmon – The Front Page as Hildy Johnson; Walter Matthau – The Front Page as Walter Burns; Burt Reynolds – The Longest Yard as Paul "Wrecking" Crewe	**Raquel Welch – The Three Musketeers as Constance Bonacieux**; Lucille Ball – Mame as Mame Dennis; Diahann Carroll – Claudine as Claudine; Helen Hayes – Herbie Rides Again as Grandma Steinmetz; Cloris Leachman – Young Frankenstein as Frau Blücher
Best Supporting Performance in a Motion Picture – Drama, Comedy or Musical
Supporting Actor	Supporting Actress
**Fred Astaire – The Towering Inferno as Harlee Claiborne**; Eddie Albert – The Longest Yard as Warden Hazen; Bruce Dern – The Great Gatsby as Tom Buchanan; John Huston – Chinatown as Noah Cross; Sam Waterston – The Great Gatsby as Nick Carraway	**Karen Black – The Great Gatsby as Myrtle Wilson**; Beatrice Arthur – Mame as Vera Charles; Jennifer Jones – The Towering Inferno as Lisolette Mueller; Madeline Kahn – Young Frankenstein as Elizabeth; Diane Ladd – Alice Doesn't Live Here Anymore as Flo Castleberry
Other
Best Director	Best Screenplay
**Roman Polanski – Chinatown**; John Cassavetes – A Woman Under the Influence; Francis Ford Coppola – The Conversation; Francis Ford Coppola – The Godfather Part II; Bob Fosse – Lenny	**Chinatown – Robert Towne**; The Conversation – Francis Ford Coppola; The Godfather Part II – Francis Ford Coppola and Mario Puzo; The Towering Inferno – Stirling Silliphant; A Woman Under the Influence – John Cassavetes
Best Original Score	Best Original Song
**The Little Prince – Alan Jay Lerner and Frederick Loewe**; Chinatown – Jerry Goldsmith; Earthquake – John Williams; The Godfather Part II – Carmine Coppola; Phantom of the Paradise – Paul Williams	**"I Feel Love" (Euel Box, Betty Box) – Benji**; "I Never Met a Rose" (Frederick Loewe, Alan Jay Lerner) – The Little Prince; "On and On" (Curtis Mayfield) – Claudine; "Sail the Summer Winds" (John Barry, Don Black) – The Dove; "We May Never Love Like This Again" (Al Kasha, Joel Hirschhorn) – The Towering Inferno
Best Foreign Film	Best Documentary Film
**Scenes from a Marriage (Sweden)**; The Adventures of Rabbi Jacob (France); Amarcord (Italy); The Apprenticeship of Duddy Kravitz (Canada); Lacombe, Lucien (France)	**Animals Are Beautiful People**; Birds Do It, Bees Do It; Hearts and Minds; I Am a Dancer; Janis
New Star of the Year – Actor	New Star of the Year – Actress
**Joseph Bottoms – The Dove as Robin Lee Graham**; James Hampton – The Longest Yard as James "Caretaker" Farrell; Lee Strasberg – The Godfather Part II as Hyman Roth; Steven Warner – The Little Prince as The Little Prince; Sam Waterston – The Great Gatsby as Nick Carraway	**Susan Flannery – The Towering Inferno as Lorrie**; Julie Gholson – Where the Lilies Bloom as Mary Call; Valerie Harper – Freebie and the Bean as Consuelo; Helen Reddy – Airport 1975 as Sister Ruth; Ann Turkel – 99 and 44/100% Dead as Buffy

The following films received multiple nominations:

Nominations	Title
7	Chinatown
6	The Godfather Part II
5	The Towering Inferno
4
4	The Conversation
4	The Great Gatsby
4	The Little Prince
4	The Longest Yard
4	A Woman Under the Influence
3	Claudine
3	The Front Page
3	Lenny
2	Alice Doesn't Live Here Anymore
2	The Dove
2	Earthquake
2	Harry and Tonto
2	Scenes from a Marriage
2	The Three Musketeers
2	Young Frankenstein

The following films received multiple wins:

Wins	Title
4	Chinatown
2	The Towering Inferno

=== Television ===
Best Television Series
Drama	Musical or Comedy
**Upstairs, Downstairs**: Columbo; Kojak; Police Story; The Streets of San Francisco; The Waltons	**Rhoda**: All in the Family; The Carol Burnett Show; The Mary Tyler Moore Show; Maude
Best Performance in a Television Series Drama
Actor	Actress
**Telly Savalas - Kojak as Lt. Theo Kojak**: Mike Connors - Mannix as Joe Mannix; Michael Douglas - The Streets of San Francisco as Steve Keller; Peter Falk - Columbo as Lt. Columbo; Richard Thomas - The Waltons as John-Boy Walton	**Angie Dickinson - Police Woman as Sgt. Suzanne "Pepper" Anderson**: Teresa Graves - Get Christie Love! as Christy Love; Michael Learned - The Waltons as Olivia Walton; Jean Marsh - Upstairs, Downstairs as Rose Buck; Emily McLaughlin - General Hospital as Nurse Jessie Brewer; Lee Meriwether - Barnaby Jones as Betty Jones
Best Performance in a Television Series – Musical or Comedy
Actor	Actress
**Alan Alda - M*A*S*H as Benjamin Franklin "Hawkeye" Pierce**: Ed Asner - The Mary Tyler Moore Show as Lou Grant; Redd Foxx - Sanford and Son as Fred G. Sanford; Bob Newhart - The Bob Newhart Show as Robert Hartley, Ph.D.; Carroll O'Connor - All in the Family as Archie Bunker	**Valerie Harper - Rhoda as Rhoda Morgenstern**: Carol Burnett - The Carol Burnett Show as Various Characters; Mary Tyler Moore - The Mary Tyler Moore Show as Mary Richards; Esther Rolle - Good Times as Florida Evans; Jean Stapleton - All in the Family as Edith Bunker
Best Supporting Performance in a Series, Miniseries or Television Film
Supporting Actor	Supporting Actress
**Harvey Korman - The Carol Burnett Show as Various Characters**: Will Geer - The Waltons as Zebulon Walton; Gavin MacLeod - The Mary Tyler Moore Show as Murray Slaughter; Whitman Mayo - Sanford and Son as Grady Wilson; Jimmie Walker - Good Times as James "J.J." Evans, Jr.	**Betty Garrett - All in the Family as Irene Lorenzo**: Ellen Corby - The Waltons as Esther Walton; Julie Kavner - Rhoda as Brenda Morgenstern; Vicki Lawrence - The Carol Burnett Show as Various Characters; Nancy Walker - McMillan & Wife as Mildred

The following programs received multiple nominations:

Nominations	Title
5	The Waltons
4	All in the Family
4	The Carol Burnett Show
4	The Mary Tyler Moore Show
3	Rhoda
2	Columbo
2	Good Times
2	Kojak
2	Sanford and Son
2	The Streets of San Francisco
2	Upstairs, Downstairs

The following programs received multiple wins:

Wins	Title
2	Rhoda

=== Cecil B. DeMille Award ===
Hal B. Wallis
