= Maj Wechselmann =

Danish-Swedish filmmaker

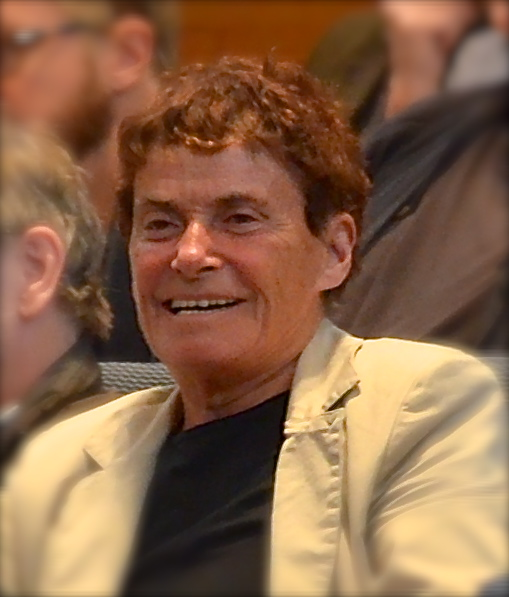
- Wechselmann in 2012
- Born: 1 April 1942; Copenhagen, Denmark
- Occupations: Director, documentary filmmaker

Maj Wechselmann (born 1 April 1942, in Copenhagen), is a Danish-Swedish documentary director and filmmaker, known for expressing radical social criticism in her documentaries.

Wechselmann was born in Copenhagen, the daughter of Bruno Wechselmann and Reina Korinman. She went through drama school in Odense, and studied film directing at the University College of Film, Radio, Television and Theatre in Stockholm in the early 1970s. Her breakthrough as a documentary filmmaker was in 1972 with Viggen 37: Ett militärplans historia, about the Swedish Saab 37 Viggen combat aircraft.

Wechselmann's films often deal with themes such as international solidarity and current political events, and her perspective is that of the political left. She is a member of the Left Party (Vänsterpartiet), and was a Left Party candidate in the Swedish European Parliament election of 2009. She is sometimes controversial, and has been described as pugnacious and humourless, but her critics also remark on the strong pathos that drives her work.

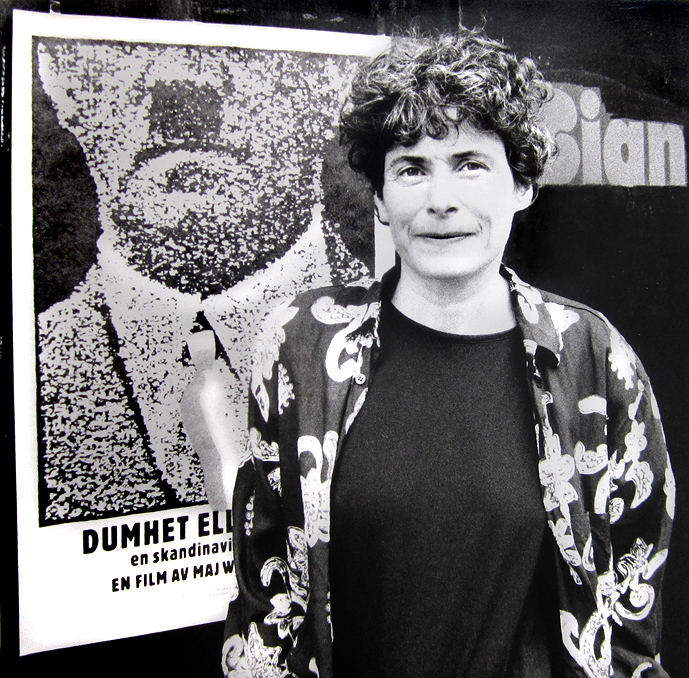
Maj Wechselmann in 1990

She has received a number of awards for her work, including the Swedish Peace and Arbitration Society's peace prize the Lenin Award, and the Moa Award.
