= National Board of Review Awards 1974 =

1974 US film awards ceremony

46th National Board of Review Awards

December 25, 1974

The 46th National Board of Review Awards were announced on December 25, 1974.

== Top Ten Films ==
1. The Conversation
2. Murder on the Orient Express
3. Chinatown
4. The Last Detail
5. Harry and Tonto
6. A Woman Under the Influence
7. Thieves Like Us
8. Lenny
9. Daisy Miller
10. The Three Musketeers

== Top Foreign Films ==
1. Amarcord
2. Lacombe, Lucien
3. Scenes from a Marriage
4. The Phantom of Liberty
5. The Pedestrian

== Winners ==
- Best Film:
  - The Conversation
- Best Foreign Film:
  - Amarcord
- Best Actor:
  - Gene Hackman - The Conversation
- Best Actress:
  - Gena Rowlands - A Woman Under the Influence
- Best Supporting Actor:
  - Holger Löwenadler - Lacombe Lucien
- Best Supporting Actress:
  - Valerie Perrine - Lenny
- Best Director:
  - Francis Ford Coppola - The Conversation
- Special Citation:
  - The Golden Voyage of Sinbad, Earthquake and The Towering Inferno, for outstanding special effects
  - Robert Youngson, for his 25-year work with tasteful and intelligent compilation of films
  - The Film Industry, for increasing care in subsidiary casting in many films
