= Amarcord =

1973 film by Federico Fellini

- Theatrical release poster by John Alcorn
- Directed by: Federico Fellini
- Written by: Federico Fellini; Tonino Guerra
- Produced by: Franco Cristaldi
- Starring: Bruno Zanin; Magali Noël; Pupella Maggio; Armando Brancia
- Cinematography: Giuseppe Rotunno
- Edited by: Ruggero Mastroianni
- Music by: Nino Rota
- Production companies: FC Produzioni; PECF
- Distributed by: PIC (Italy); Warner Bros. (international)
- Release dates: 18 December 1973 (Italy); 10 May 1974 (France)
- Running time: 124 minutes
- Countries: Italy; France
- Language: Italian
- Box office: $2.3 million

Amarcord (Italian: [amarˈkɔrd]) is a 1973 Italian-French comedy-drama film directed by Federico Fellini, a semi-autobiographical tale about Titta, an adolescent boy growing up among an eccentric cast of characters in the village of Borgo San Giuliano (situated near the ancient walls of Rimini) in 1930s Fascist Italy.

The film's title is a univerbation (multiple words combined to form a single word) of the Romagnol phrase a m'arcôrd (pronounced [a marˈkoːrd]), 'I remember'. Fellini elaborated further by suggesting that the Italian words amare ('to love'), cuore ('heart'), ricordare ('to remember') and amaro ('bitter') could be expressed simultaneously through the Romagnol word. The title then became a neologism of the Italian language, with the meaning of 'nostalgic evocation', 'fond memory'.

The central role of Titta is based on Fellini's childhood friend from Rimini, Luigi Titta Benzi. Benzi became a lawyer and remained in close contact with Fellini throughout his life. Titta's sentimental education is emblematic of Italy's "lapse of conscience". Fellini skewers Mussolini's ludicrous posturings and those of a Catholic Church that "imprisoned Italians in a perpetual adolescence" by mocking himself and his fellow villagers in comic scenes that underline their incapacity to adopt genuine moral responsibility or outgrow foolish sexual fantasies.

The film won the Academy Award for Best Foreign Language Film, and was nominated for two more Academy Awards: Best Director and Best Original Screenplay the following year.

In 2008, the film was included on the Italian Ministry of Cultural Heritage’s 100 Italian films to be saved, a list of 100 films that "have changed the collective memory of the country between 1942 and 1978."

== Plot ==
In Borgo San Giuliano, a village near Rimini, the arrival of fluffy poplar seeds floating on the wind heralds the arrival of spring. As night falls, the inhabitants make their way to the village square for the fogheraccia, a traditional bonfire in which the segavecchia, an effigy of an old woman, is ritually burned. The townspeople play pranks on one another, explode fireworks, cavort with loose women and make lewd noises when the civically minded lawyer lectures on the history of the region.

School under Fascism is a tedious cavalcade of dry facts recited by instructors of varying levels of engagement and skill. All Titta and his fellow students can do is goof off or skip class when not called upon to solve math problems or identify obscure historical details. When Titta goes to confession, he manages to avoid telling Don Balosa about his masturbatory activities and attempt to seduce Gradisca, a glamorous older woman, because the priest is more concerned with floral arrangements.

Fascist officials come for a tour, and the schoolchildren are required to perform athletic routines for their approval. Titta's friend Ciccio daydreams about being married to his crush, Aldina, by a giant papier-mâché rendering of Mussolini's face. Surreptitiously wired into the bell tower of the town church, a gramophone plays a recording of "The Internationale", but it is soon shot at and destroyed by Fascists. Owing to his anarchist past, Titta's father Aurelio is brought in for questioning and forced to drink castor oil. He limps home in a nauseous state to be washed by his wife, Miranda.

One summer afternoon, the family visits Uncle Teo, Aurelio's brother, confined to an insane asylum. They take him out for a day in the country, but he escapes into a tree, repeatedly yelling, "Voglio una donna!" ("I want a woman!"). All attempts to bring him down are met with stones that Teo carries in his pockets. A dwarf nun and two orderlies finally arrive on the scene. Marching up the ladder, the nun reprimands Teo, who obediently agrees to return to the asylum.

Fall arrives. The town's inhabitants embark in small boats to meet the passage of the SS Rex, the regime's proudest technological achievement. By midnight they have fallen asleep waiting for its arrival. Awakened by a foghorn, they watch in awe as the liner sails past, capsizing their boats in its wake. Titta's grandfather wanders lost in a disorienting fog so thick it seems to smother the house and the autumnal landscape. Walking out to the town's Grand Hotel, Titta and his friends find it boarded up. Like zombies, they waltz on the terrace with imaginary female partners enveloped in the fog.

The annual car race provides the occasion for Titta to daydream of winning the grand prize, Gradisca. One evening he visits the buxom tobacconist at closing time. She becomes aroused when he demonstrates he is strong enough to lift her, but is annoyed when he becomes overwhelmed as she presses her breasts into his face. She gives him a cigarette then coldly sends him home.

Winter brings with it record snowfall. Miranda nurses a sick Titta to health, then as spring arrives again, dies of an illness herself. Titta is devastated. Later, the village attends the reception for Gradisca's marriage to a Carabiniere. As Gradisca drives off with her new husband, someone notices that Titta has gone too.

== Cast ==
- Pupella Maggio as Miranda Biondi, Titta's mother
- Armando Brancia as Aurelio Biondi, Titta's father
- Magali Noël as Gradisca, a hairdresser
- Ciccio Ingrassia as Teo, Titta's uncle
- Nando Orfei as Lallo or Patacca, Titta's uncle
- Bruno Zanin as Titta
- Luigi Rossi as Lawyer
- Josiane Tanzilli as Volpina
- Maria Antonietta Beluzzi as the tobacconist
- Giuseppe Ianigro as Titta's grandfather
- Stefano Proietti as Oliva, Titta's brother
- Alvaro Vitali as Naso
- Bruno Scagnetti as Ovo
- Fernando De Felice as Ciccio
- Bruno Lenzi as Gigliozzi
- Gianfranco Marrocco as Count Poltavo
- Francesco Vona as Candela
- Donatella Gambini as Aldina Cordini

== Deleted scene ==
A scene was shot that was later cut from the film by Fellini. The scene was shot without sound. It is described, however, in the novelization published by Rizzoli in 1973 and involves the contessa's loss of a diamond ring down her toilet. Carlini, or "Eau de cologne", the man who empties the town's cesspits, is called to retrieve it. This scene is available on the Criterion release of the film.

== Reception ==
=== Europe ===
Released in Italy on 18 December 1973, Amarcord was an "unmitigated success". Critic Giovanni Grazzini, reviewing for the Italian newspaper Corriere della Sera, described Fellini as "an artist at his peak" and the film as the work of a mature, more refined director whose "autobiographical content shows greater insight into historical fact and the reality of a generation. Almost all of Amarcord is a macabre dance against a cheerful background".

The film screened at the 1974 Cannes Film Festival, but was not entered into the main competition.

Russell Davies, British film critic and later a BBC radio host, compared the film to the work of Thornton Wilder and Dylan Thomas: "The pattern is cyclic ... A year in the life of a coastal village, with due emphasis on the seasons, and the births, marriages and deaths. It is an Our Town or Under Milk Wood of the Adriatic seaboard, concocted and displayed in the Roman film studios with the latter-day Fellini's distaste for real stone and wind and sky. The people, however, are real, and the many non-actors among them come in all the shapes and sizes one cares to imagine without plunging too deep into Tod Browning freak territory."

Rapidly picked up for international distribution after winning an Oscar for Best Foreign Film in 1975, the film was destined to be Fellini's "last major commercial success". In 2008, the film was voted at number 50 on the list of the "100 Greatest Films" by the French magazine Cahiers du cinéma.

=== United States ===
On the review aggregator website Rotten Tomatoes, Amarcord holds an approval rating of 88%, based on 48 reviews, with an average rating of 8.2/10. The website's critics consensus reads, "Ribald, sweet, and sentimental, Amarcord is a larger-than-life journey through a seaside village and its colorful citizens."

When Amarcord opened in New York City, critic Vincent Canby lauded it as possibly "Fellini's most marvelous film ... It's an extravagantly funny, sometimes dreamlike evocation of a year in the life of a small Italian coastal town in the nineteen-thirties, not as it literally was, perhaps, but as it is recalled by a director with a superstar's access to the resources of the Italian film industry and a piper's command over our imaginations. When Mr. Fellini is working in peak condition, as he is in Amarcord (the vernacular for 'I remember' in Romagna), he somehow brings out the best in us. We become more humane, less stuffy, more appreciative of the profound importance of attitudes that in other circumstances would seem merely eccentric if not lunatic."

Rating the film four out of four stars, critic Roger Ebert discussed Fellini's value as a director: "It's also absolutely breathtaking filmmaking. Fellini has ranked for a long time among the five or six greatest directors in the world, and of them all, he's the natural. Ingmar Bergman achieves his greatness through thought and soul-searching, Alfred Hitchcock built his films with meticulous craftsmanship, and Luis Buñuel used his fetishes and fantasies to construct barbed jokes about humanity. But Fellini ... well, moviemaking for him seems almost effortless, like breathing, and he can orchestrate the most complicated scenes with purity and ease. He's the Willie Mays of movies." Ebert ranked the film fourth on his "10 Best Films of 1973" list. He later included the film on his Great Movies list. Jay Cocks of Time magazine considered it "some of the finest work Fellini has ever done—which also means it stands with the best that anyone in film has ever achieved."

In the British Film Institute's 2012 Sight & Sound polls of the greatest films ever made, Amarcord was ranked 30th among directors.

=== Accolades ===
Award	Category	Nominee(s)	Result
Academy Awards (1974)	Best Foreign Language Film	Italy	Won
Academy Awards (1975)	Best Director	Federico Fellini	Nominated
Academy Awards (1975)	Best Original Screenplay	Federico Fellini and Tonino Guerra	Nominated
Bodil Awards	Best European Film	Federico Fellini	Won
Cinema Writers Circle Awards	Best Foreign Film		Won
David di Donatello Awards	Best Film		Won
David di Donatello Awards	Best Director	Federico Fellini	Won
French Syndicate of Cinema Critics	Best Foreign Film	Federico Fellini	Won
Golden Globe Awards	Best Non-English Language Film		Nominated
Italian Golden Globe Awards	Best Film	Federico Fellini	Won
Kansas City Film Critics Circle Awards	Best Foreign Film		Won
Kinema Junpo Awards	Best Foreign Language Film Director	Federico Fellini	Won
Nastro d'Argento	Best Director	Federico Fellini	Won
Nastro d'Argento	Best Supporting Actor	Ciccio Ingrassia	Nominated
Nastro d'Argento	Best Supporting Actress	Pupella Maggio	Nominated
Nastro d'Argento	Best New Actor	Gianfilippo Carcano	Won
Nastro d'Argento	Best Screenplay	Federico Fellini and Tonino Guerra	Won
Nastro d'Argento	Best Original Story	Federico Fellini and Tonino Guerra	Won
Nastro d'Argento	Best Cinematography	Giuseppe Rotunno	Nominated
Nastro d'Argento	Best Costume Design	Danilo Donati	Nominated
Nastro d'Argento	Best Score	Nino Rota	Nominated
National Board of Review Awards	Top Five Foreign Language Films		Won
National Board of Review Awards	Best Foreign Language Film		Won
National Society of Film Critics Awards	Best Director	Federico Fellini	Runner-up
New York Film Critics Circle Awards	Best Film		Won
New York Film Critics Circle Awards	Best Director	Federico Fellini	Won
SESC Film Festival	Best Foreign Film	Federico Fellini	Won
Turkish Film Critics Association Awards	Best Foreign Film		Won
Valladolid International Film Festival	Golden Spike (Best Film)	Federico Fellini	Nominated

== Home media ==
In 1984, Amarcord became the first film released for home video fully letterboxed, as implemented by RCA for their Capacitance Electronic Disc videodisc format. The film was later released on DVD twice by The Criterion Collection, first in 1998, then re-released in 2006 with an anamorphic widescreen transfer and additional supplements. Criterion re-issued the 2006 release on Blu-ray Disc in 2011. The film was also released as part of Criterion's "Essential Fellini" boxset in 2020.

== See also ==
- List of submissions to the 47th Academy Awards for Best Foreign Language Film
- List of Italian submissions for the Academy Award for Best Foreign Language Film
