= The Conversation =

1974 film by Francis Ford Coppola

- Theatrical release poster
- Directed by: Francis Ford Coppola
- Written by: Francis Ford Coppola
- Produced by: Francis Ford Coppola; Fred Roos
- Starring: Gene Hackman; John Cazale; Allen Garfield; Cindy Williams; Frederic Forrest
- Cinematography: Bill Butler; Haskell Wexler (uncredited)
- Edited by: Walter Murch; Richard Chew
- Music by: David Shire
- Production company: The Directors Company
- Distributed by: Paramount Pictures
- Release date: April 7, 1974
- Running time: 113 minutes
- Country: United States
- Language: English
- Budget: $1.6 million
- Box office: $4.9 million

The Conversation is a 1974 American neo-noir mystery psychological thriller film written, co-produced, and directed by Francis Ford Coppola. It stars Gene Hackman as surveillance expert Harry Caul who faces a moral dilemma when his recordings reveal a potential murder. Supporting cast members include John Cazale, Allen Garfield, Cindy Williams, and Frederic Forrest. Harrison Ford and Teri Garr appear in credited roles, and Robert Duvall in an uncredited role. Mackenzie Phillips, who had just worked for Coppola on American Graffiti along with Williams and Ford, had a supporting role as Harry Caul's niece that was dropped during the film's editing stage. Likewise, Abe Vigoda's role as Caul's lawyer also ended up on the cutting room floor.

The Conversation premiered at the 1974 Cannes Film Festival, where it won the Palme d'Or, and was released theatrically on April 7, 1974, by Paramount Pictures to critical acclaim. It made $4.4 million during its original release, and after several re-releases, its total rose to $4.8 million on a $1.6 million budget. The film received three nominations at the 47th Academy Awards: Best Picture, Best Original Screenplay, and Best Sound.

In 1995, it was selected for preservation in the United States National Film Registry by the Library of Congress as being "culturally, historically, or aesthetically significant".

== Plot ==
Harry Caul, a surveillance expert in San Francisco, specializes in audio recordings. He and his team are hired by a client known as "the Director" to eavesdrop on a couple, whom they record walking in circles in Union Square. Despite the background noise, Harry filters and merges the tapes to create a clear recording with ambiguous meaning. Harry is intensely private, obsessively guarding his personal life; though he insists that he is not responsible for how his clients use the surveillance he creates, he is haunted by guilt from a past job that resulted in three deaths.

He meets with Martin Stett (Ford) who meets with Harry instead of the Director, who told Harry to give the tapes only to him. Harry wrests them away and Stett warns him about the contents of the tapes. When he discovers a potentially dangerous phrase in the recording, "He'd kill us if he got the chance," Harry becomes increasingly anxious. His attempt to deliver the recording is thwarted, and he is both followed and threatened.

After a party at his workshop, Harry spends the night with a woman he has just met and the tapes are stolen. He receives a call from Martin Stett, the Director's assistant, informing him that the Director could not wait any longer and they have the tapes. Harry is tasked with delivering the pictures taken and collecting his money in a meeting with the Director that afternoon. There he learns that the woman in the recording is the Director's wife, involved in an affair. Harry, suspecting murder, books a hotel room next to the one the couple had mentioned for a planned rendezvous in the recording, and sees a bloody altercation from the balcony. Harry retrets to his room and passes out. Hours later Harry wakes up convinced there was a murder, Harry breaks into the room; he initially finds the room spotless, but when he flushes the toilet it is clogged and overflowing with blood.

Attempting to confront the Director, Harry discovers the wife is alive and unharmed, as is her lover. A newspaper headline reports that an executive has supposedly died in a car accident. Harry realizes that the couple actually murdered the Director, having missed the emphasis on the word "us" in the recording, which not only expressed the couple's fear of being killed by the Director if he discovered the affair, but was also an attempt to justify killing him first as a defensive move.

Stett calls Harry at his apartment, and warns him not to investigate. He plays a freshly made recording of Harry playing his saxophone to prove they are listening. Harry frantically searches for bugs in his apartment, destroying nearly everything in it. Having failed to locate the bug, Harry sits alone amid the wreckage, playing his saxophone.

== Cast ==
- Gene Hackman as Harry N. Caul
- John Cazale as Stanley "Stan" Ross
- Allen Garfield as William P. "Bernie" Moran
- Cindy Williams as Ann
- Frederic Forrest as Mark
- Harrison Ford as Martin Stett
- Michael Higgins as Paul
- Elizabeth MacRae as Meredith
- Teri Garr as Amy Fredericks
- Phoebe Alexander as Lurleen
- Mark Wheeler as Receptionist
- Robert Shields as The Mime
- Robert Duvall as The Director

== Production ==
Principal photography began November 27, 1972, and finished in late February 1973. The original cinematographer of The Conversation was Haskell Wexler. Severe creative and personal differences with Coppola led to Wexler's firing shortly after production began, and Coppola replaced him with Bill Butler, whom he had previously worked with on The Rain People and The Godfather. Wexler's footage on The Conversation was completely reshot except for the technically complex surveillance scene in Union Square. This movie was the first of two Oscar-nominated films where Wexler would be fired and replaced by Butler, the second being One Flew Over the Cuckoo's Nest (1975), where Wexler had similar problems with Miloš Forman.

Walter Murch served as the supervising editor and sound designer. Murch had more or less a free hand during the editing process because Coppola was working on The Godfather Part II at the time. Coppola noted in the DVD commentary that Hackman had a very difficult time adapting to the Harry Caul character because he was so much unlike himself. Coppola says that Hackman was at the time an outgoing and approachable person who preferred casual clothes, whereas Caul was meant to be a socially awkward loner who wore a rain coat and out-of-style glasses. Coppola said that Hackman's efforts to tap into the character made the actor moody and irritable on set, but otherwise Coppola got along well with his leading man. Coppola also notes on the commentary that Hackman considers this one of his favorite performances.

Coppola has cited Michelangelo Antonioni's Blowup (1966) as a key influence on his conceptualization of the film's themes, such as surveillance versus participation, and perception versus reality. "Francis had seen [it] a year or two before, and had the idea to fuse the concept of Blowup with the world of audio surveillance."

Private investigator Hal Lipset is credited as a technical advisor on the film. He chose state-of-the-art surveillance equipment, and had Caul's surveillance follow methods which were mostly realistic. In the film, Lipset and Caul are mentioned as two of the pre-eminent surveillance experts who will be attending a convention.

On the DVD commentary, Coppola says he was shocked to learn that the film used the same surveillance and wire-tapping equipment that members of the Nixon Administration used to spy on political opponents prior to the Watergate scandal. Coppola has said this reason is partially why the film gained the recognition it has received, but it was entirely coincidental. Not only was the script for The Conversation completed in the mid-1960s, before Nixon became president, but the spying equipment used in the film was discovered through research and the use of technical advisers, and not, as many believed, by revelatory newspaper stories about the Watergate break-in. Coppola also noted that filming of The Conversation had been completed several months before the most revelatory Watergate stories broke in the press. Because the film was released to theaters just a few months before Richard Nixon resigned as president, Coppola felt that audiences interpreted the film to be a reaction to both the Watergate scandal and its fall-out.

=== Score ===
The Conversation's piano score is composed and performed by David Shire. The score was created before the film was shot. On some cues, Shire used musique concrète techniques, taking the taped sounds of the piano and distorting them in different ways to create alternative tonalities to round out the score. The score was released on CD by Intrada Records in 2001.

=== Inspiration ===
According to surveillance technology expert Martin Kaiser, his colleagues consider him to be the inspiration for the character of Harry Caul. Kaiser also says that he served as a technical consultant on the film, though he was not listed in the credits. According to Kaiser, the final scene of the film—in which Caul is convinced he is being eavesdropped in his apartment, cannot find the listening device, and consoles himself by playing his saxophone—was inspired by the passive covert listening devices created by Léon Theremin, such as the Great Seal bug. "He couldn't find out where [the bug] was because it was the instrument itself."

Coppola also based Caul on the protagonist of Herman Hesse's 1927 novel Steppenwolf, Harry Haller, a "total cipher" who lives alone in a boarding house. Coppola also made Caul religious, including a confession scene; Coppola has said that the practice of confession is "one of the earliest forms of the invasion of privacy—earliest forms of surveillance."

Caul was also inspired by Karl Schnazer; a private investigator and occasional actor who appeared in Coppola's early films Tonight for Sure and Dementia 13. Schnazer recounted to Coppola an incident where a man he had tailed for months failed to recognize him at a party, which later inspired a sequence in the film.

== Reception ==
=== Box office ===
The film had a $1.6 million budget and grossed $4.42 million in the U.S. Various re-releases over the years have brought the film's gross to $4.9 million.

=== Critical response ===
The Conversation has a 94% rating on Rotten Tomatoes, based on 141 reviews, with an average rating of 9.4/10. The site's critics consensus reads: "This tense, paranoid thriller presents Francis Ford Coppola at his finest—and makes some remarkably advanced arguments about technology's role in society that still resonate today." On Metacritic, the film has a weighted average score of 88 out of 100 based on 17 critics, indicating "universal acclaim".

Roger Ebert's contemporary review gave The Conversation four out of four stars and described Hackman's portrayal of Caul as "one of the most affecting and tragic characters in the movies". In 2001, Ebert added The Conversation to his "Great Movies" list, describing Hackman's performance as a "career peak" and writing that the film "comes from another time and place than today's thrillers, which are so often simple-minded".

In 1995, The Conversation was selected for preservation in the United States National Film Registry by the Library of Congress as being "culturally, historically, or aesthetically significant". Gene Hackman has named the film his favorite of all those he has made. His performance in the lead role was listed as the 37th greatest in history by Premiere magazine in 2006. In 2012, the Motion Picture Editors Guild listed the film as the eleventh-best edited film of all time based on a survey of its membership.

The film ranked 33rd on the BBC's 2015 list of "100 Greatest American Films", voted by film critics from around the world. In 2016, The Hollywood Reporter ranked the film 8th among 69 counted winners of the Palme d'Or to date, concluding: "Made in a flash between the first two Godfather movies, Coppola’s existential spy thriller has since become a pinnacle of the genre." In The Sight and Sound Greatest Films of All Time 2022 director's poll, The Conversation was ranked at 72nd place.

The February 2020 issue of New York Magazine lists The Conversation as among "The Best Movies That Lost Best Picture at the Oscars."

=== Accolades ===
The Conversation won the Palme d'Or, the highest honor at the 1974 Cannes Film Festival. The film was also nominated for three Academy Awards for 1974, but lost to Coppola's own The Godfather Part II. It won the National Board of Review Award for Best Film.

Award	Date of ceremony	Category	Recipient(s)	Result	Ref.
Academy Awards	April 8, 1975	Best Picture	Francis Ford Coppola & Fred Roos	Nominated	
Academy Awards	April 8, 1975	Best Original Screenplay	Francis Ford Coppola	Nominated	
Academy Awards	April 8, 1975	Best Sound	Walter Murch and Art Rochester	Nominated	
British Academy Film Awards	1975	Best Direction	Francis Ford Coppola	Nominated	
British Academy Film Awards	1975	Best Actor	Gene Hackman	Nominated	
British Academy Film Awards	1975	Best Screenplay	Francis Ford Coppola	Nominated	
British Academy Film Awards	1975	Best Editing	Walter Murch, Richard Chew	Won	
British Academy Film Awards	1975	Best Soundtrack	Art Rochester, Nat Boxer, Mike Ejve, Walter Murch	Won	
Cannes Film Festival	May 9–24, 1974	Grand Prix du Festival International du Film	Francis Ford Coppola	Won	
Directors Guild of America	1974	Directorial Achievement in Motion Pictures	Francis Ford Coppola	Nominated	
Golden Globes	January 25, 1975	Best Motion Picture – Drama		Nominated	
Golden Globes	January 25, 1975	Best Director – Motion Picture	Francis Ford Coppola	Nominated	
Golden Globes	January 25, 1975	Best Screenplay	Francis Ford Coppola	Nominated	
Golden Globes	January 25, 1975	Best Actor in a Motion Picture – Drama	Gene Hackman	Nominated	
National Board of Review	December 25, 1974	Best Film		Won	
National Board of Review	December 25, 1974	Best Director	Francis Ford Coppola	Won	
National Board of Review	December 25, 1974	Best Actor	Gene Hackman	Won	
National Board of Review	December 25, 1974	Top Ten Films		Won	
National Society of Film Critics	January 5, 1975	Best Director	Francis Ford Coppola	Won	

== Enemy of the State ==
According to film critic Kim Newman, the 1998 film Enemy of the State, which also features Gene Hackman as a co-star, could be construed as a "continuation of The Conversation". Hackman's character Edward Lyle in Enemy of the State closely resembles Caul: he dons the same translucent raincoat, and his workshop is nearly identical to Caul's. Also, the photograph used for Lyle in his NSA file is actually a photograph of Caul. Enemy of the State also includes a scene which is very similar to The Conversation's opening surveillance scene in San Francisco's Union Square.

== In other media ==
A television pilot starring Kyle MacLachlan as Harry Caul was produced for NBC. It was not picked up for a full series.

== See also ==
- List of American films of 1974
- List of films featuring surveillance
- Blow Out, a 1981 Brian De Palma film that is similar in content
