= 29th Venice International Film Festival =

Italian film festival in 1968

- Location: Venice, Italy
- Founded: 1932
- Awards: Golden Lion: Artists Under the Big Top: Perplexed
- Festival date: 25 August – 7 September 1968
- Website: Website

Venice Film Festival chronology
- 30th 28th

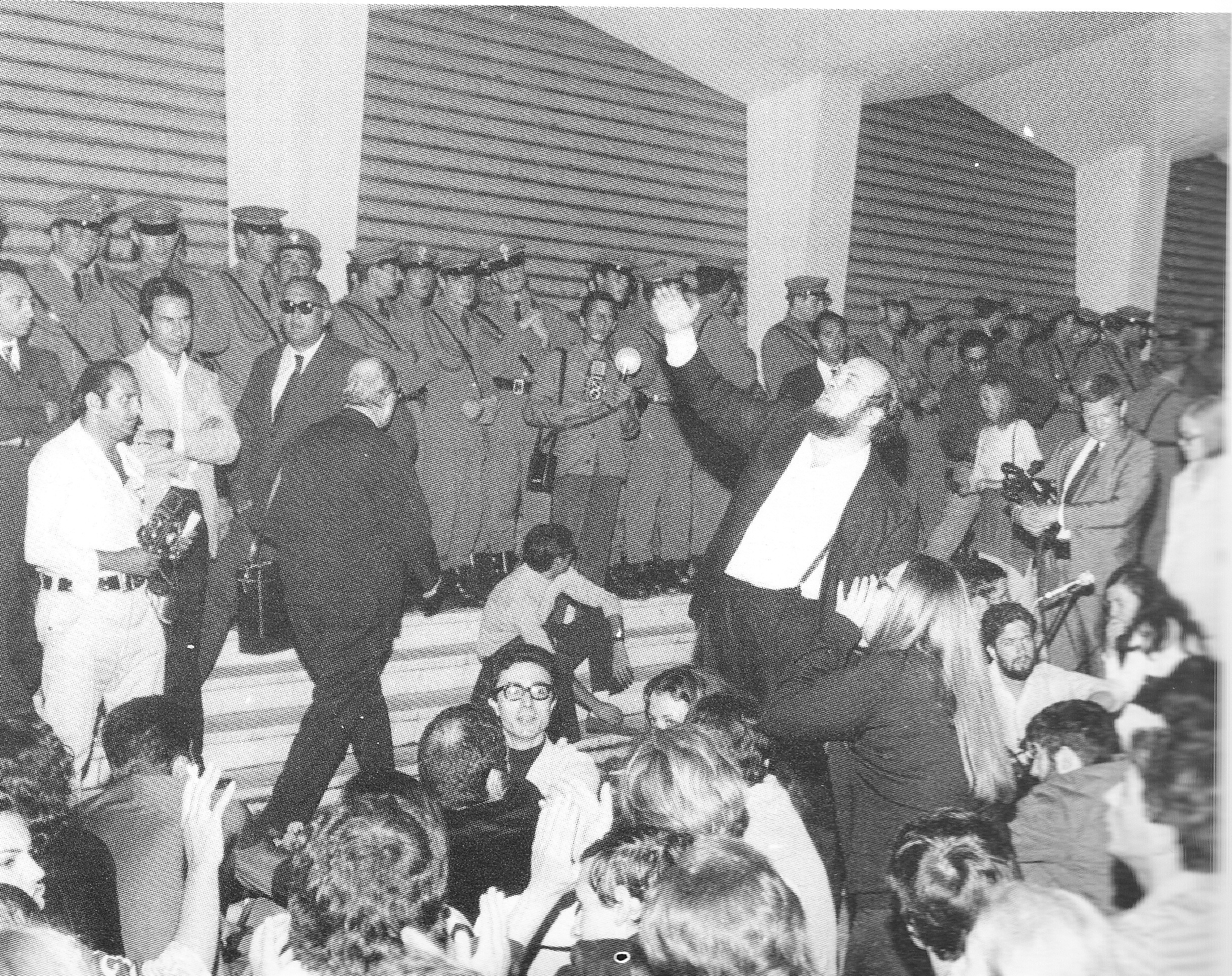
Demonstration in front of the celebration of the Venice Film Festival in 1968. In the front, you can see director Marco Ferreri.

The 29th annual Venice International Film Festival was held from 25 August to 7 September 1968.

The May 1968 events in France had serious repercussions on this festival. Five days before the festival was to be held, directors of the Italian filmmakers association ANAC, for both political and cultural reasons, withdrew their films from the competition. The Communist Party and the Socialist Party of Proletarian Unity were in favor of the boycott. Some directors, however, defected from this decision and Roberto Rossellini, Liliana Cavani, Bernardo Bertolucci and Nelo Risi decided to project their films. Pier Paolo Pasolini initially refused to participate at the festival, but finally his film entered in Competition.

During the inauguration day, the police had occupied the Palazzo del Cinema del Lido. The inauguration ceremony was skipped and a decision was taken to go ahead with the festival in a self-managed way, with the director of the festival, Chiarini, as chairman. The next day the police intervened and the meetings were canceled. Finally the competition started on the evening of 27 August, while demonstrations against "the fascist and bourgeois exhibition" were taking place outside the Palazzo.

== Jury ==
- Guido Piovene, Italian writer and journalist - Jury President
- Jacques Doniol-Valcroze, French actor and filmmaker
- Akira Iwasaki, Japanese producer and film critic
- Roger Manvell, British author and filmmaker
- István Nemeskürty, Hungarian screenwriter and producer
- Vicente Antonio Pineda, Spanish
- Edgar Reitz, West-German director and producer

== Official Selections ==
The following films were selected to be screened:

== In Competition ==
English title	Original title	Director(s)	Production country
After the Deluge	Después del diluvio	Jacinto Esteva	Spain
Artists Under the Big Top: Perplexed	Die Artisten in der Zirkuskuppel: Ratlos	Alexander Kluge	West Germany
Ballad for a Dog	Ballade pour un chien	Gérard Vergez	France
The Castle	Das Schloß	Rudolf Noelte	West Germany
The Deserters and the Nomads	Zbehovia a pútnici	Juraj Jakubisko	Czechoslovakia
Diary of a Schizophrenic Girl	Diario di una schizofrenica	Nelo Risi	Italy
Faces		John Cassavetes	United States
Falak		András Kovács	Hungary
Fire!	Fuoco!	Gian Vittorio Baldi	Italy
Galileo		Liliana Cavani	Italy
Kierion		Dimosthenis Theos	Greece
Me and My Brother		Robert Frank	United States
Monterey Pop		D. A. Pennebaker	United States
Naked Childhood	L'Enfance nue	Maurice Pialat	France
Noon	Podne	Mladomir Puriša Đorđević	Yugoslavia
Our Lady of the Turks	Nostra Signora dei Turchi	Carmelo Bene	Italy
Partner		Bernardo Bertolucci	Italy
Seven Days Somewhere Else	Sept jours ailleurs	Marin Karmitz	France
Silence and Cry	Csend és kiáltás	Miklós Jancsó	Hungary
Socrates	Le Socrate	Robert Lapoujade	France
Spray of the Days	L'Écume des jours	Charles Belmont	France
Stress Is Three	Stress es tres, tres	Carlos Saura	Spain
Summit		Giorgio Bontempi	Italy
Tell Me Lies		Peter Brook	United Kingdom
Teorema		Pier Paolo Pasolini	Italy
Wheel of Ashes		Peter Emmanuel Goldman	United States
Wild in the Streets		Barry Shears	United States

== Out of Competition ==
English title	Original title	Director(s)	Production country
A Report on the Party and the Guests	O slavnosti a hostech	Jan Nemec	Czechoslovakia
Sul davanti fioriva una magnolia		Paolo Breccia	Italy

== Informativa ==
English title	Original title	Director(s)	Production country
Het compromis		Philo Bregstein	Netherlands
Mandabi	Le Mandat	Ousmane Sembène	France, Senegal

== Official Awards ==
=== Main Competition ===
- Golden Lion: Artists Under the Big Top: Perplexed by Alexander Kluge
- Special Jury Prize:
  - Our Lady of the Turks by Carmelo Bene
  - Le Socrate by Robert Lapoujade
  - Mandabi by Ousmane Sembène
- Volpi Cup for Best Actor: John Marley for Faces
- Volpi Cup for Best Actress: Laura Betti for Teorema
- Honorable Mention: Kierion by Dimos Theos

=== Pasinetti Award ===
- Best Film: Faces by John Cassavetes
