= The Other Side of Dawn =

The Other Side Of Dawn may refer to:

- The Other Side Of Dawn, a 1999 book by John Marsden and the CBCA Children's Book of the Year Award: Older Readers 2000
- Alexander: The Other Side of Dawn, an NBC made-for-television movie, first telecast 1977
