= Lynn Carlin =

American actress

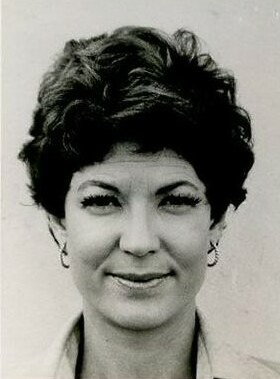
- Lynn Carlin in 1976
- Born: January 31, 1938 (age 88); Los Angeles, California, U.S.
- Occupation: Actress
- Years active: 1968–1987
- Spouses: Peter Hall (m. 1958; div. 1960) Ed Carlin (m. 1963; div. 1974) John Wolfe (m. 1983; died 1999)
- Children: 2, including Dan Carlin

Mary Lynn Carlin (née Reynolds; born January 31, 1938) is an American retired actress. For her debut role in the 1968 John Cassavetes film Faces, she was nominated for an Academy Award for Best Supporting Actress, becoming the first nonprofessional performer to receive an Oscar nomination. She was later nominated for the BAFTA Award for Best Actress in a Leading Role for her performance in Milos Forman’s Taking Off (1971).

== Life and career ==
Lynn Carlin was born in Los Angeles, the daughter of socialite Muriel Elizabeth (née Ansley) and 'Larry Reynolds' (Laurence Kramer). Her father was a Hollywood business manager, and her mother worked in radio. She grew up in Laguna Beach.

Carlin made her stage debut in The Women at the Laguna Beach Playhouse.

Carlin, Robert Altman's secretary-turned-actress, earned her only Academy Award nomination in 1968 for her first feature role as John Marley's suicidal wife Maria in John Cassavetes' Faces (1968). She is the first nonprofessional to be nominated for an Academy Award. She subsequently played wives and mothers before retiring in 1987. She next appeared in ...tick...tick...tick... (1970) as George Kennedy's ambitious, henpecking wife and returned to offbeat roles as Buck Henry's wife, searching for her missing daughter amid the hippies and drug culture of 1970s New York in Miloš Forman's Taking Off (1971). The same year, she appeared in Blake Edwards' western Wild Rovers. In 1972, she was re-teamed with John Marley, again as his wife, in Bob Clark's horror film Deathdream, and her other film roles include the British drama film Baxter! (1973) as the mother of Scott Jacoby, the 1979 comedy French Postcards, and the 1982 horror film Superstition.

Carlin played the parent of growing teen Lance Kerwin in the TV-movie James at 15 (1977) and its subsequent spin-off James at 16. In 1977, she was cast in several episodes of The Waltons as a nurse who marries the county sheriff. She appeared in the 1976 miniseries Rich Man, Poor Man Book II, and she had a recurring role on the short-lived television series Strike Force (1981–1982). She appeared in several other TV movies, including Silent Night, Lonely Night. In 1972, Carlin appeared in an episode of Gunsmoke titled "Milligan" as the wife of Harry Morgan's character.

In 1971, she played the mother of teenage father Desi Arnaz Jr. in Mr. and Mrs. Bo Jo Jones. The same year, she played Peter Falk's wife in A Step Out of Line. In 1974, Carlin appeared in both Terror on the 40th Floor and The Morning After. She played the wife of Sam Houston in the biopic The Honorable Sam Houston in 1975. The following year, she played Eve Plumb's mother in Dawn: Portrait of a Teenage Runaway.

In her last television movie, Carlin played the mother of three young men manipulated into breaking their father (Robert Mitchum) out of jail in A Killer in the Family (1983). Her last acting role was a guest appearance on Murder, She Wrote in 1987 as the wife of the episode's murder victim, played by Cornel Wilde.

== Personal life ==
Carlin was married to Peter Hall from 1958 until their divorce in 1960. Her second marriage was to Edward Carlin, with whom she had two children. This union (1963–74) also ended in divorce. Her oldest child is podcaster/journalist Dan Carlin. She was married to John Wolfe from 1983 until his death in 1999.

== Filmography ==
=== Film ===
Year	Title	Role	Notes
1968	Faces	Maria Forst	
1970	...tick... tick... tick...	Julia Little	
1971	Taking Off	Lynn Tyne	
1971	Wild Rovers	Sada Billings	
1973	Baxter!	Mrs. Baxter	
1974	Dead of Night	Christine Brooks	
1975	Iron and Horse	Meridel York	Short
1979	French Postcards	Mrs. Weber	
1980	Battle Beyond the Stars	Nell (voice)	
1982	Superstition	Melinda Leahy	

=== Television ===
Year	Title	Role	Notes
1969	Marcus Welby, M.D.	Helen Stewart	Season 1 Episode 2: "The Foal"
1969	Silent Night, Lonely Night	Jennifer Sparrow	TV Movie
1969–1972	Medical Center	Ruth Dwyer / Louise Nolan	2 episodes
1970	The Bold Ones: The Protectors	Sister Marie Theresa	Season 1 Episode 5: "A Thing Not of God"
1971	A Step Out of Line	Linda Connors	TV Movie
1971	Mr. and Mrs. Bo Jo Jones	Christine Jones	ABC Movie of the Week
1971	The Bold Ones: The New Doctors	Meredith Lindon	Season 3 Episode 6: "The Glass Cage"
1971	Cannon	Helen Kern	Season 1 Episode 13: "The Nowhere Man"
1972	Gunsmoke	Janet Milligan	Season 18 Episode 9: "Milligan"
1972	Love, American Style	Ruth	Season 4 Episode 11: "segment: Love and the Swinging Philosophy"
1972	Emergency!	Mrs. Patterson	Season 2 Episode 10: "Dinner Date"
1972	Young Dr. Kildare	Laura Henderson	Episode: "The Stranger"
1973	Ironside	Mary Jane Smith	Season 7 Episode 1: "Confessions: From a Lady of the Night"
1973	Hawaii Five-O	Maxine Taylor	Season 6 Episode 11: "The Finishing Touch"
1974	The Morning After	Fran Lester	ABC Movie of the Week
1974	The Last Angry Man	Sarah Abelman	ABC Movie of the Week
1974	Terror on the 40th Floor	Lee Parker	TV Movie
1974	Petrocelli	Audrey North	Season 1 Episode 4: "Edge of Evil"
1974	Mannix	Nancy Traherne	Season 8 Episode 6: "Death Has No Face"
1974	Lucas Tanner	Ann Lefferts	Season 1 Episode 9: "Look the Other Way"
1974	Paper Moon	Sue Jean	Season 1 Episode 11: "Who Is M. P. Sellers?"
1974–1980	Insight	Jean / Helen Madden / Marge / Betty / Janet / Betty	6 episodes
1975	The Honorable Sam Houston	Margaret Houston	TV Movie
1975	The Lives of Jenny Dolan	Nancy Royce	TV Movie
1975–1977	The Waltons	Eula Mae / Sara Griffith Bridges	5 episodes
1976	City of Angels	Cora Manning	Season 1 Episode 5: "A Lonely Way to Die"
1976	The Tenth Level	Barbara	TV Movie
1976	Dawn: Portrait of a Teenage Runaway	Dawn's Mother	TV Movie
1976	Rich Man, Poor Man Book II	Sarah Hunt	Season 1 Episode 7: "Chapter VII"
1976	Serpico	Viveca Janes	Season 1 Episode 15: "A Secret Place"
1977	Bravo Two	Mrs. Morgan	TV Movie
1977	Gibbsville		Season 1 Episode 13: "The Grand Gesture"
1977–1978	James at 15	Meg Hunter	Series regular
1978	The Bionic Woman	Norma Fisk	Season 3 Episode 15: "The Martians Are Coming, the Martians Are Coming"
1979	Not Until Today	Mae Henderson	TV Movie
1979	The Incredible Hulk	Elizabeth Collins	Season 3 Episode 3: "Brain Child"
1979	Barnaby Jones	Mary Baines	Season 8 Episode 5: "Design for Madness"
1979	California Fever	Mrs. Newman	Season 1 Episode 6: "Portrait of Laurie"
1979	Charlie's Angels	Warden Ingram	Season 4 Episode 6: "Caged Angel"
1979	Mrs. Columbo	Sheree	Season 2 Episode 3: "Off the Record"
1980	Tenspeed and Brown Shoe	Alice Rynkoff	Season 1 Episode 13: "The Treasure of Sierra Madre Street"
1980	Lou Grant	Catherine Marks	Season 4 Episode 2: "Harassment"
1980–1985	Trapper John, M.D.	Rose Tiegs / Claire Dearborne	3 episodes
1981	Girl on the Edge of Town	Selma Mantley	TV Movie
1981	Strike Force	Lorraine Klein	2 episodes
1981	Darkroom	Mrs. Shires	Season 1 Episode 11: "Catnip"
1982	The Kid from Nowhere	Molly Edward	TV Movie
1982	Forbidden Love	Ella Wagner	TV Movie
1983	A Killer in the Family	Dorothy Tison	TV Movie
1987	Murder, She Wrote	Nicole	Season 4 Episode 5: "The Way to Dusty Death"
2021	Consequences	Churchgoer	Season 2 Episode 3: "Leap of Faith"

== Awards and nominations ==
Year	Award	Category	Nominated work	Result
1969	3rd National Society of Film Critics Awards	Best Actress	Faces	Nominated
1969	41st Academy Awards	Best Supporting Actress	Faces	Nominated
1972	25th British Academy Film Awards	Best Actress in a Leading Role	Taking Off	Nominated
