= Dead of Summer =

Dead of Summer can refer to:

- Dead of Summer (film), a 1970 Italian film
- Dead of Summer (TV series), a 2016 US TV series
