= Donyale Luna =

American model and actress (1945–1979)

- Luna in 1966 for Twen
- Born: Peggy Ann Freeman; August 31, 1945; Detroit, Michigan, U.S.
- Died: May 17, 1979 (aged 33); Rome, Italy
- Cause of death: Heroin overdose
- Occupations: Model, actress
- Spouse: Luigi Cazzaniga (m. 1976)
- Children: 1
- Modeling information
- Height: between 5 ft 10 in (1.78 m) and 6 ft 2 in (1.88 m)
- Hair color: Black
- Eye color: Brown

Peggy Ann Freeman (August 31, 1945 – May 17, 1979), known professionally as Donyale Luna, and occasionally billed simply as Luna, was an American model and actress. Known for her statuesque appearance and avant-garde persona, Luna was one of the most recognizable faces in the international fashion industry during the 1960s and is widely regarded as the first Black supermodel.

Born in Detroit, Luna began her modeling career in New York in 1964. She became the first Black model to appear on the cover of Harper's Bazaar, depicted in an illustration. Luna rose to prominence in Europe, where she became the first Black model to appear on the cover of British Vogue in 1966. She worked with the leading photographers of the time, including Richard Avedon, David Bailey, William Klein, and Helmut Newton, and appeared in major fashion publications such as Harper's Bazaar, Vogue, Cosmopolitan, and Elle. Her success challenged racial barriers in the fashion industry at a time when Black models remained largely excluded from mainstream editorial work.

Luna also pursued an acting career, appearing in several experimental films by Pop artist Andy Warhol—such as Camp (1965) and Donyale Luna (1967)—and becoming a fixture of his Factory scene as one of Warhol's superstars. She was also a muse to surrealist painter Salvador Dalí, collaborating with him on several happenings in 1966. She later appeared in European arthouse and avant-garde films, including Skidoo (1968), directed by Otto Preminger, Fellini Satyricon (1969), directed by Federico Fellini, and Salomè (1972), directed by Carmelo Bene. Luna died from a heroin overdose in 1979 at the age of 33. She has been recognized posthumously as a pioneering figure whose success helped pave the way for later generations of Black models.

== Early life and education ==
Peggy Ann Freeman was born in Detroit, Michigan, on August 31, 1945, to Nathaniel Freeman and Peggy Freeman (née Hertzog). One of three daughters, she grew up in a financially stable household on Scotten Avenue. Her father, who had migrated from Georgia during the Great Migration, worked at the Ford Motor Company, while her mother worked as a secretary for the Young Women's Christian Association.

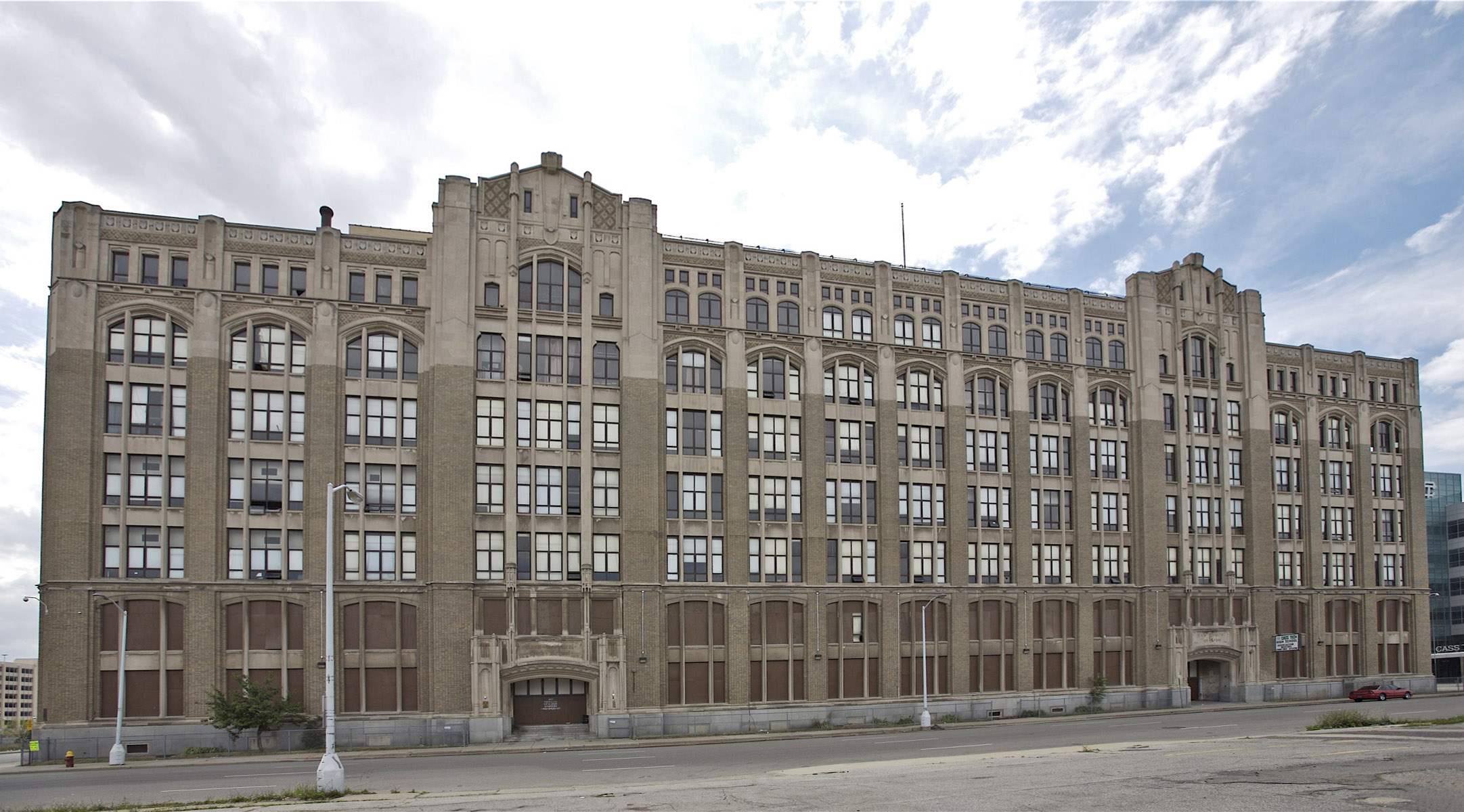
Luna attended Cass Technical High School in Detroit

Freeman attended the Detroit High School of Commerce for steno, typing, IBM, data processing and Cass Technical High School, where she studied languages and performing arts. Outside school, she participated in community theater and the experimental Concept East Theater, developing an early interest in acting. By the age of eighteen, she had adopted the name "Donyale Luna" and began cultivating the distinctive persona that would later define her public image, including an invented accent and elaborate stories about her background. According to her sister, she was "a very weird child, even from birth, living in a wonderland, a dream."

As a teenager, Luna immersed herself in Detroit's theatre community, performing in productions of Paint Your Wagon, The Tempest, Anything Goes, and Stage Door. Known for her eccentricity, she often went barefoot and frequented coffehouses around Wayne State University dressed in black. "We were the last of the beatniks," recalled her classmate, Saunders Bryant III. Although later celebrated for her appearance, she recalled that "back in Detroit I wasn't considered beautiful or anything", while classmates remembered her as striking but unconventional.

== Modeling career ==
=== Move to New York and first assignment ===
In 1963, Luna was spotted near the Fisher Building in downtown Detroit by English photographer David McCabe, who was in the city on assignment for Ford Motor Company. Struck by her appearance, McCabe later recalled that she was "so striking" that he felt compelled to stop her and offer his assistance should she decide to pursue modeling in New York. Initially, her mother opposed the move, fearing McCabe was trying to make a "bad girl" out of her. After Luna persisted, her mother arranged for her to live temporarily with an aunt in New Jersey. In October 1964, Luna relocated to New York and contacted McCabe, who introduced her to Harper's Bazaar editor-in-chief Nancy White and fashion editor China Machado. White and Machado were immediately impressed by her appearance, and Luna accepted an exclusive one-year contract with Harper's Bazaar.

Although the January 1965 issue was already in production, White approved a last-minute feature showcasing Luna in a series of illustrations by artist Katharina Denzinger. Denzinger later recalled drawing "a total of 40 brush-and-ink studies for that session, in a one-room studio apartment on Lexington Avenue. . . . I remember that the Bazaar editors came to the apartment with the clothes, and that uniformed cops watched while Donyale modeled and I drew her." Luna appeared in seven full-color drawings, including the cover image for the fashion editorial "Chic Proportions '65," making Luna the first Black model to appear on the magazine's cover. Whether the decision to depict her in illustrations rather than photographs reflected artistic considerations or resistance to featuring Black models prominently in fashion magazines has remained a subject of discussion among historians.

In November 1964, Luna moved out of her aunt's apartment and into an apartment on Broadway in New York City, sharing the space with a roommate. In January 1965, her father was described by a relative as a "brutal man," was fatally shot by her mother during a domestic dispute that was later ruled self-defense.

=== Collaborations with Richard Avedon ===
Machado introduced Luna to photographer Richard Avedon, who became her manager. In the April 1965 edition of Harper's Bazaar she was photographed by Avedon in a 6-page spread wearing dresses by James Galanos and Bill Blass for Maurice Rentner. The piece included a description of her as showing "The tall strength and pride of movement of a Masai Warrior." Although Luna quickly gained attention through editorial work for Harper's Bazaar, she encountered significant racial barriers within the American fashion industry. Designers Mainbocher and Norman Norell reportedly refused to dress her, and McCabe later argued that "the magazine world really wasn't ready for photographing beautiful Black women." Following Luna's appearance in Harper's Bazaar, advertisers in the American South reportedly withdrew advertising, some subscribers cancelled their subscriptions, and publisher William Randolph Hearst expressed dissatisfaction. As a result, the magazine barred photographer Richard Avedon from photographing Luna again.

After leaving Harper's Bazaar for Vogue in 1966, Avedon sought to include Luna in one of his first assignments for the magazine, a fur-fashion shoot in Japan. Recalling the decision in 1972, he said: "I wanted the model to be Donyale Luna" because she possessed "this terrific sense of physical history about her" and evoked "something that hadn't even happened yet." However, Vogue editor-in-chief Diana Vreeland rejected Avedon's choice, and Luna was replaced by German model Veruschka in the resulting photo essay, "The Great Fur Caravan," published in October 1966.

Luna ended her professional association with Avedon after her contract expired. Avedon later attributed the difficulties surrounding her career to "racial prejudice and the economics of the fashion business," while Luna claimed that "the more successful she became, the more controlling and possessive her fashion-photographer-manager became."

=== Exposure in Europe and International success ===
Seeking greater opportunities, Luna relocated to London in December 1965, where she became associated with the Swinging London cultural scene. She rented an apartment near the Thames River and bought a pet Maltese dog she named Christianne. She would later remember of the move to Europe, "I wouldn't have to be bothered with political situations when I woke up in the morning—I could live and be treated as I felt, without having to worry about the police coming along."

Luna emerged as one of the most recognizable models in Europe, working with photographers including David Bailey, William Klein, Helmut Newton, and William Claxton. Luna became the first African American model to appear on the cover of any Vogue edition when she appeared on the cover of the March 1966 issue of British Vogue, photographed by Bailey. She was chosen by Beatrix Miller, then the editor of British Vogue, for "her bite and personality."

Luna subsequently appeared in British, French, Italian, and American editions of Vogue, as well as Elle, Queen, Cosmopolitan, Twen, and Paris Match. She worked extensively for designers including Paco Rabanne, Pierre Cardin, Yves Saint Laurent, Christian Dior, Emanuel Ungaro, Guy Laroche, and Ted Lapidus, and appeared in campaigns and editorials throughout Europe, Australia, and the United States.

In 1966, Time magazine described Luna as "the hottest model in Europe," while American Vogue named her its "Model of the Year." Jet magazine editor Charles L. Sanders observed that, "American fashion fotogs missed the boat (and we all know why) when they ignored the talents of Detroit's Donyale Luna. Maybe it was best that they did, since Donyale's now living in London and is probably the most photographed girl of 1966. She's even challenging Britain's Jean Shrimpton for position (and bankroll) as the model most in demand in Europe's haute couture houses."

Luna also made several television appearances in 1966. She appeared on British television's Late Show London on March 14 and The Eamonn Andrews Show on May 1, and on December 12, she appeared on The Tonight Show Starring Johnny Carson.

In December 1966, mannequin designer Adel Rootstein introduced life-size mannequins modeled on Luna at the Wallis boutique on King's Road in London. Luna traveled to London for several sittings during which photographs were taken for reference, and sculptor John Taylor used them to create the figures. Within a year, reports from Britain noted the commercial success of the mannequins in department stores. At Rackhams department store in Birmingham, a Luna mannequin was the store's best-selling display figure, outselling models based on figures such as Elizabeth Taylor, Jean Shrimpton, and Twiggy.

In 1967, Luna covered a number of Jazz albums for Blue Note Records, such as Lou Donaldson's Lush Life, Donald Byrd's Mustang, Sam Rivers' A New Conception, Big John Patton's Let 'em Roll and Stanley Turrentine's Easy Walker. That year, she modeled "swift, slipsy dresses" from the New York boutique Paraphernalia as the featured attraction of the "Donyale Luna Spectacular" at Roselands shopping mall in Sydney.

In November 1968, Luna was involved in a highly publicized incident at London's Cavendish Hotel with actress Mia Farrow, actor Iain Quarrier, filmmaker Donald Cammell, and journalist Steve Brandt. The group was refused service at the hotel's restaurant and asked to leave. Hotel management maintained they had been disruptive and that the men were not wearing ties, while Luna and Farrow alleged the group had been targeted because Luna was Black. When the group refused to leave without an explanation, police were called, Quarrier was arrested following a struggle, and he was later convicted of assaulting a police officer and fined. The incident attracted widespread international media attention, with numerous newspaper reports also describing Luna's ensemble for her court appearance, which included a Mongolian lamb coat and thigh-high suede boots.

During the late 1960s, she continued to model internationally, while earning some of the highest fees in the industry. In 1969, it was reported that she was paid "$1,000 a week." Luna appeared in American Vogue in August 1969 and in 1970 in an advertisement for a colored contacts company which she often wore, it was reported she "changes her eyes to match her moods as she flits through Rome's posh parties while picture making for Carlo Ponti."

By the early 1970s, Luna had settled primarily in Rome, where she continued to work in European publications and advertising campaigns. In January 1970, she appeared in the Italian adult magazine Playmen in a number of fishnet-style outfits. She worked for Danish photographer Gunnar Larsen, modeling for the couturier Ted Lapidus alongside Veruschka and Jean Shrimpton on the streets of Paris, earning "$1000 ... for the day."

=== Later career ===
Luna returned periodically to the United States for runway and editorial work, but her career gradually shifted toward film and other artistic pursuits. In 1972, she began collaborating on creative projects with her future husband, photographer Luigi Cazzaniga.

In 1974, Luna and Cazzaniga returned to the United States for a year. During this period, her modeling career began to decline amid reports of drug use and increasingly erratic behavior. Fellow model Beverly Johnson, who became American Vogue's first Black cover girl in 1974, was openly critical of what she perceived as Luna's lack of professionalism. In a 1975 New York Times interview, Johnson remarked, "As for Donyale Luna, she doesn't wear shoes, winter or summer. Ask her where she's from—Mars? She went up and down the runways on her hands and knees and didn't show up for bookings. She didn't have a hard time, she made it hard for herself." She also disputed the idea that Luna or Naomi Sims had paved the way for her own career by confronting racial barriers. Johnson nevertheless later acknowledged Luna's broader influence on the industry and on opportunities for subsequent Black models.

Luna modeled in Halston's Fall 1974 collection in New York, attracting attention for an impromptu runway performance in a silver sequined hooded evening gown. During the show, she unzipped the dress to the waist and spent several minutes moving in a dramatic, snake-like manner on the floor, a performance that reportedly surprised both the audience and Halston's staff. Later that year, she appeared alongside actor Hiram Keller on the cover of the October 1974 edition of Interview magazine.

In April 1975, Luna appeared in the Pacific Design Center fashion show, where ten Los Angeles designers presented their vision of California fashion to an audience of retailers and journalists. During the event, she drew attention for a provocative runway appearance that reportedly "bared her bottom."

She then appeared nude in a photo spread for the April 1975 issue of Playboy photographed by Cazzaniga. While the images included nudity, they were presented as stylized artistic tableaux, depicting Luna in mythological and symbolic roles such as Icarus, a mermaid, and a meditative underwater figure. In June 1975, she attended a Zandra Rhodes show at the Circle in the Square in New York. In one of her last modeling projects, she was photographed by Peter Beard in Montauk, New York in 1977.

Timeline of magazine covers

== Acting career ==
Luna originally aspired to become an actress and performed in amateur and repertory theater productions in Detroit during her youth. After moving to New York, she audtioned to be a chorus girl in the Broadway production of Flora the Red Menace in 1965. In 1966, she remarked, "I never planned to be a model when I was in Detroit. I wanted to be a starving actress in New York."

In 1965, Luna became part of Pop artist Andy Warhol's Factory scene and appeared in several of his experimental films, including two Screen Tests, in which critic Wayne Koestenbaum later described her as "pure diva, presenting a delicious mobile excess of mannerism." She also appeared in Warhol's Camp (1965), a satire of his social milieu, dancing to the Ramsey Lewis Trio's "The 'In' Crowd" while wearing a backless dress and fur stole. During this period, Luna appeared in William Klein's satirical fashion film Who Are You, Polly Maggoo? (1966), and had a brief role in Michelangelo Antonioni's Blowup (1966).

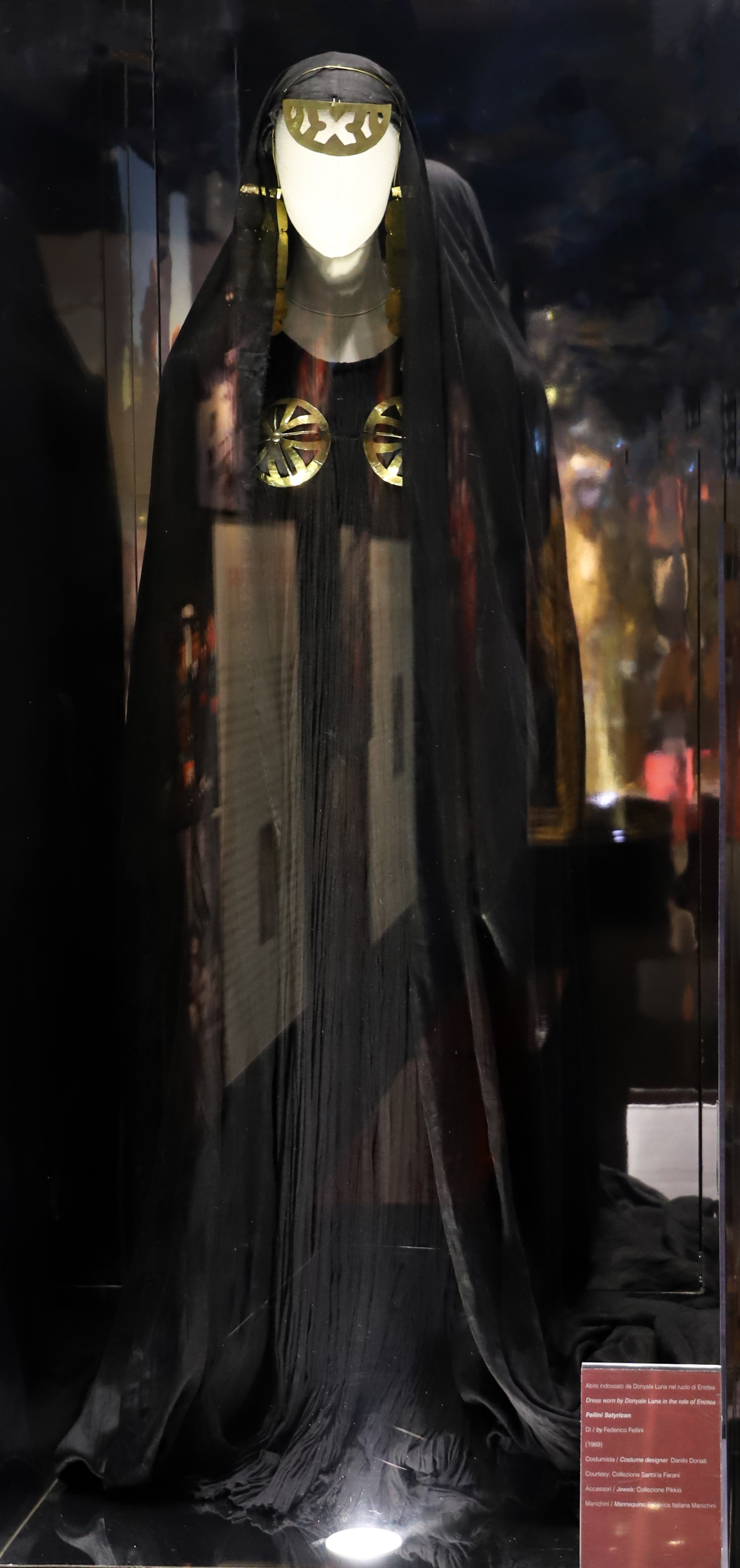
Luna's costume, worn in the film Fellini Satiricon (1969), on display at Cinecittà in Rome

Luna was also a muse of surrealist painter Salvador Dalí, whom she met in Cadaqués after being introduced by American photographer William Claxton. In 1966, Dalí and Luna were reported to be collaborating on a CBS-commissioned film composed of a scriptless series of happenings, which Dalí described as illustrating his "third birth," with Luna's presence symbolically extending its themes. The film was later broadcast on French television in 1970 under the title Autoportrait mou de Salvador Dalí (Salvador Dalí: A Soft Self-Portrait). She also appeared in staged surrealist compositions, including standing on a half-submerged piano, posing while Dalí drew on her clothing, and emerging from a human-sized egg filled with paint.

In 1967, Luna starred in Warhol's 33-minute color film Donyale Luna, playing a camp interpretation of Snow White and wearing bright blue contact lenses. That year, Luna met director Otto Preminger at a New York party held for Twiggy and invited him to a screening of a Warhol film. Preminger instead invited Luna and Warhol to his office, where they screened Donyale Luna (1967). Preminger later recalled that Luna had shown "great talent" and was impressed by her ambition and screen presence. The day after their meeting, Luna invited him to lunch to discuss "business" and proposed that he finance a Warhol film. When Preminger replied that he directed films rather than financed them, Luna quipped, "Oh, you direct too." Preminger subsequently cast her in the comedy Skidoo (1968), in which she played the mistress of a crime boss portrayed by Groucho Marx. Following the film, Preminger signed Luna to a three-year MGM contract.

In 1968, Luna appeared in The Rolling Stones Rock and Roll Circus as an assistant in a circus fire-eating act, but the film wasn't released until 1996. Luna continued her acting career in Europe, appearing in Marco Ferreri's Dillinger Is Dead (1969), and portraying the witch Oenothea in Federico Fellini's Fellini Satyricon (1969). Her final film role was the title character in Carmelo Bene's Salomé (1972).

Luna was also associated with European pop music scene, having been featured in the Italian music video for Patty Pravo's song Michelle (1969). In the early 1970s, she became associated with experimental theater circles such as the Living Theatre while in Italy.

In 1973, Luna presented a film project based on her life to producers attending the Cannes Film Festival. Although the proposal was not developed, she later claimed that it inspired Berry Gordy's 1975 film Mahogany.

== Death ==
Luna's later years were marked by increasing involvement in Rome's drug scene. She died from a heroin overdose at a clinic in Rome on May 17, 1979, at the age of 33. She was survived by her estranged husband, Luigi Cazzaniga, and their 18-month-old daughter, Dream.

== Artistry ==
In her 1975 Playboy interview, Luna said, "I'm not a model, I'm an artist. I do modeling and acting as part of my artistry; instead of a paintbrush and canvas, I use film. Most people who model are not artists—just models." Luna cultivated an eccentric and highly theatrical public persona that drew on Surrealism and camp. Inspired by Nefertiti and Josephine Baker, she developed the alter ego "Donyale Luna" through what some writers compare to performance art. This persona involved a highly stylized presentation of self, including wigs and colored contact lenses. She frequently altered her voice, posture, and mannerisms, creating a shifting public identity distinct from her earlier self, Peggy-Ann.

Scholars have interpreted Luna's self-fashioning as a form of "Black glamour" that both appropriated and disrupted Western visual codes. Building on the legacy of Josephine Baker's "primitive glamour," Luna used the persona of "Donyale" to articulate a new model of Black beauty and subjectivity within predominantly white fashion and cultural spaces.

Her visual work and modeling were often read in relation to mid-century modernism, particularly the Surrealist art of Salvador Dali and the photography of Man Ray. In advertising and editorial work, she used exaggerated poses and angular bodily expression to challenge conventional representations of Black femininity in fashion imagery. As historian Elspeth H. Brown noted, "Warhol saw and appreciated the artifice that Luna embodied as an ethereal model with an invented past, and even race. Within Warhol's queer art world, Luna was a star because of her exaggerated femininity, her posing, her artifice."

Sources differ on Luna's height, with some listing her at 5 ft 10 and 5 ft 11 in, while others, including her sister, recall her as 6 ft 2 in. Beyond her stature, Luna became known for her theatrical runway presence. Although she could perform a standard catwalk walk, she often employed unconventional, performance-driven movements that influenced later models such as Pat Cleveland. Her distinctive style reflected an early interest in acting and experimental theater in Detroit. Fashion photographer and journalist Bill Cunningham described her movements as resembling those of "a panther" and "an exotic bird," noting that audiences applauded her performance as much as the clothing she modeled. "The coterie of international designers for whom she often modeled (André Courrèges, Yves Saint Laurent, Rudi Gernreich, Mary Quant, Paco Rabanne) encouraged such displays, equating them to their own exuberant designs and to the rebellious conduct of their youthful ... clientele," wrote historian Richard J. Powell.

== Personal life ==
=== Racial identity ===
Luna identified as multiracial and throughout her life gave varying accounts of her ancestry, at times describing herself as having indigenous Mexican, African, Irish, Polynesian, and other backgrounds. Known for cultivating an enigmatic public persona, she frequently responded playfully to questions about her origins, once remarking, "I'm from the moon, darling." Dazed editor Phillipa Burton argued that these claims as well as her penchant for wearing colored contacts was formed part of a broader process of self-invention that began in her youth.

Luna began her modeling career during a period when non-white models faced significant barriers within the American fashion industry. After achieving success in Europe, she often described herself as "multi-ethnic" and resisted being defined primarily by race. Luna stated in 1966: "I think I've been successful because I'm a strange, weird-looking thing whole families stop in the street to stare after me. They saw me as something different but I'm sure it was nothing to do with my color. I never think of myself as a brown-skin girl." "I think I'm ugly," she told a London interviewer. "People were ready for something different. Fashion has been dominated by blue-eyed, blond-haired girls for years. I'd rather be blue-eyed and blond-haired myself, but God made me the way I am and it's a great change."

Her views on race and identity have attracted considerable commentary. While some writers have interpreted her statements as distancing herself from her African-American heritage, others have emphasized her opposition to racial discrimination and her reluctance to accept externally imposed labels. In response to questions about her racial background, Luna told The New York Times, "Yeah, I'm an American on Black and white, but I'm me, I'm me."

After her death, her husband Luigi Cazzaniga stated that Luna identified as a "mulatta" and felt rejected by both Black and white communities. Her daughter Dream Cazzaniga later wrote that many "people longed for her to become a symbol of the African-American resistance – a role she struggled with as someone who identified as mixed race."

=== Relationships ===
In the mid-1960s, Luna was briefly married to a German actor for ten months. She was later reportedly engaged to Swiss actor Maximilian Schell, as well as an unnamed Danish photographer and German actor Georg Willing. According to Andy Warhol, Luna's relationships could be turbulent; he recalled an incident relayed by Geraldine Smith in 1967, "Donyale had this crazy boyfriend who came in last night and smashed her over the head with a beer bottle."

Luna was involved with Australian artist Martin Sharp and Canadian actor Iain Quarrier in 1968. Around 1969, she had a relationship with German actor Klaus Kinski, which eventually ended Kinski asked her entourage to leave his house in Rome because he was concerned that their drug use could damage his career.

In September 1969, Luna met Italian photographer Luigi Cazzaniga at a fashion show in Rome. The couple later reunited after a period apart and married in California in 1976. Their daughter, Dream Cazzaniga, was born in 1977 and was named after Martin Luther King Jr.'s "I Have a Dream" speech. Although they remained legally married, Luna and Cazzaniga were separated at the time of her death.

=== Mental health and drug addiction ===
Luna had a nervous breakdown and spent time recovering in the hospital at the end of 1965. Two years later, she told The New York Times that she fled New York for Europe at the end of 1965, when she found "they said beautiful things on one side and turned around and stabbed you in the back."

Luna's roommate in 1967, Geraldine Smith, told Warhol that "she thought they were all going to get kicked out soon because Donyale was making about five hundred dollars' worth of calls to Europe every month and Roberta's husband was getting mad about the phone bill." Smith also recalled Luna lecturing her and other housemates on how "disgraceful it was that we were smoking pot and taking LSD." Despite this apparent disapproval of drug use, Luna later developed a dependence on drugs. A designer for whom Luna once worked said, "She took a lot of drugs and never paid her bills."

In 2007, Luna's last husband Luigi Cazzaniga reflected on Luna's drug use, writing that although she "did drugs" and "probably died of [a] heroin overdose," she "wasn't addicted to opiates for all the time I knew her, or even before, as far as I know."

=== Religion and spirituality ===
Luna converted to Catholicism as an adolescent, from her family's Presbyterian roots.

Luna expressed apocalyptic and metaphysical beliefs about a coming "great division" because "don't know how to live. They don't know what life's about, they don't know how to give, how to love—nor do they want to. And those who are beautiful enough—I don't mean physically but something beyond that—they will have the chance to learn how to fly, to be beautiful, to rise above the level of the normal human—to be superior beings first and eventually gods and goddesses."

== Legacy ==
Luna's breakthrough into high fashion in 1965 challenged longstanding racial barriers in fashion, where Black models were often cast according to what scholars have described as an "exotic" racial script that combined primitivism and modernity. Fashion journalist Brigid Keenan observed that, before Luna, Black figures in fashion imagery were frequently relegated to the background as props rather than featured as models. Although Keenan argued that Luna's highly distinctive appearance did not provide a style that other women could readily emulate, she maintained that Luna's success demonstrated that Black models could pursue careers in mainstream fashion and helped expand opportunities for those who followed.

Her March 1966 cover of British Vogue has been widely recognized as a milestone in fashion history, helping to expand opportunities for Black models in magazines that had previously catered primarily to white audiences. Some scholars have argued that the composition, which partially obscured Luna's facial features, reflected contemporary Eurocentric beauty standards and may have minimized visual markers of her race. Members of Luna's family, however, later stated that the image was chosen for its striking graphic quality, emphasizing "a single heavily lined eye ... visible through her fingers, which form a V for Vogue."

Widely regarded as the first Black supermodel, Luna's achievements were long overshadowed by her unconventional public image and early death. Her career has been characterized as a "meteoric ascent to fame and freefall into anonymity." Writing for Dazed in 2009, Phillipa Burton observed that Luna had "for the most part, been forgotten," contrasting her with later models whose careers more visibly embodied the "Black is Beautiful" movement. Burton further described Luna's 1966 Vogue cover as a breakthrough whose significance remained relevant because a Black model appearing on the cover of a mainstream fashion magazine was "still unusual".

Fashion designer Stephen Burrows later reflected that Luna "was ahead of the Black model thing", recalling that there were "not too many around" in the United States during the 1960s. Scholars have suggested that the timing of her career, which largely predated the mainstream success of the "Black is Beautiful" movement, contributed to her relative exclusion from later narratives of Black fashion history. Nevertheless, Luna is now regarded as "a key player in the mid-to late 1960s fashion, film, and experimental theater scenes", whose influence extended beyond modeling into avant-garde culture. Model Pat Cleveland cited Luna as an inspiration who helped open doors for later generations of models of color.

Interest in Luna's legacy has grown in the 21st century with renewed interest in her modeling career on social media, fashion bloggers, and among Black business owners. She appeared in Vogue's 2008 "all-Black" issue, was recognized by Naomi Campbell during her 2019 CFDA Fashion Awards acceptance speech, and has been cited as an inspiration by figures including Pat McGrath and Nan Goldin. Her imagery was recreated by Afro-Brazilian TV personality Thelma Assis for Harper's Bazaar Brazil and actress Zendaya of Essence in 2020. In 2023, the HBO Max documentary Donyale Luna: Supermodel, co-produced by her daughter Dream Cazzaniga, introduced Luna's story to a wider audience.

== Filmography ==
Year	Title	Role	Notes
1965	Screen Test #3	Herself	Uncredited
1965	Screen Test #4	Herself	Uncredited
1965	Camp		
1966	Who Are You, Polly Maggoo?	Mannequin/Model	Alternative title: Qui êtes vous, Polly Maggoo?
1967	Donyale Luna	Snow White	
1968	Skidoo	God's Mistress	Credited as Luna
1969	Fellini Satyricon	Enotea	Alternative title: Satyricon
1969	Dillinger is Dead	Background role	Uncredited
1970	Soft Self-Portrait of Salvador Dali	Herself	Filmed in 1966
1972	Salomé	Salomè	
1976	Il Festival del proletariato giovanile al Parco Lambro	Herself	
1996	The Rolling Stones Rock and Roll Circus	Herself	Released posthumously (filmed in 1968)
