= Andremo in città =

- Promotional poster
- Directed by: Nelo Risi
- Written by: Edith Bruck; Jerzy Stefan Stawiński; Cesare Zavattini; Nelo Risi
- Produced by: Franco Cancellieri
- Starring: Geraldine Chaplin; Nino Castelnuovo; Federico Scrobogna
- Cinematography: Tonino Delli Colli
- Music by: Ivan Vandor
- Release date: 17 March 1966 (Italy)
- Running time: 102 minutes
- Countries: Italy, Yugoslavia

Andremo in città (We'll Go to the City) is a 1966 Italian drama film directed by Nelo Risi. It is based on the novel of the same name by Edith Bruck, Risi's wife. Bruck, a Hungarian concentration camp-survivor, settled in Italy after the Second World War and wrote about her experiences in autobiographical and fictional formats. The film stars Geraldine Chaplin and Nino Castelnuovo.

== Plot ==
In rural Yugoslavia, Lenka (Chaplin) lives with her blind brother, Miscia (Scrobogna). They were orphaned of their Greek Orthodox mother and their Jewish father, Rasco (Gavrić) is believed to have been killed in the war. As the Second World War continues to rage and fascism activity blights Europe, Lenka and her brother become increasingly vulnerable targets to anti-semitic sentiment. She finds support in Ivan (Castelnuovo), a partisan in love with her. Meanwhile, Rasco returns alive, despite reports of his death. Rasco ultimately sacrifices himself to save the life of Ivan, who lies injured in the family's attic. The SS return to collect Lenka and Miscia, who do not reveal the whereabouts of Ivan.

== Cast ==
- Geraldine Chaplin as Lenka Vitas
- Nino Castelnuovo as Ivan
- Stefania Careddu as Eva
- Federico Scrobogna as Miscia Vitas
- Aleksandar Gavrić as Rasko Vitas
- Giovanni Ivan Scratuglia
- Slavko Simić as Dottore Kolarov

== Production ==
The film's opening was shot near Novi Sad, Yugoslavia (modern day Serbia). The locomotive JŽ 51-007 (or MÁV 375.956) is displayed in front of the Novi Sad railway station since 15 April 1988, to mark the 105th anniversary of railway traffic in Novi Sad.
