= Stefania Careddu =

Italian retired film and stage actress

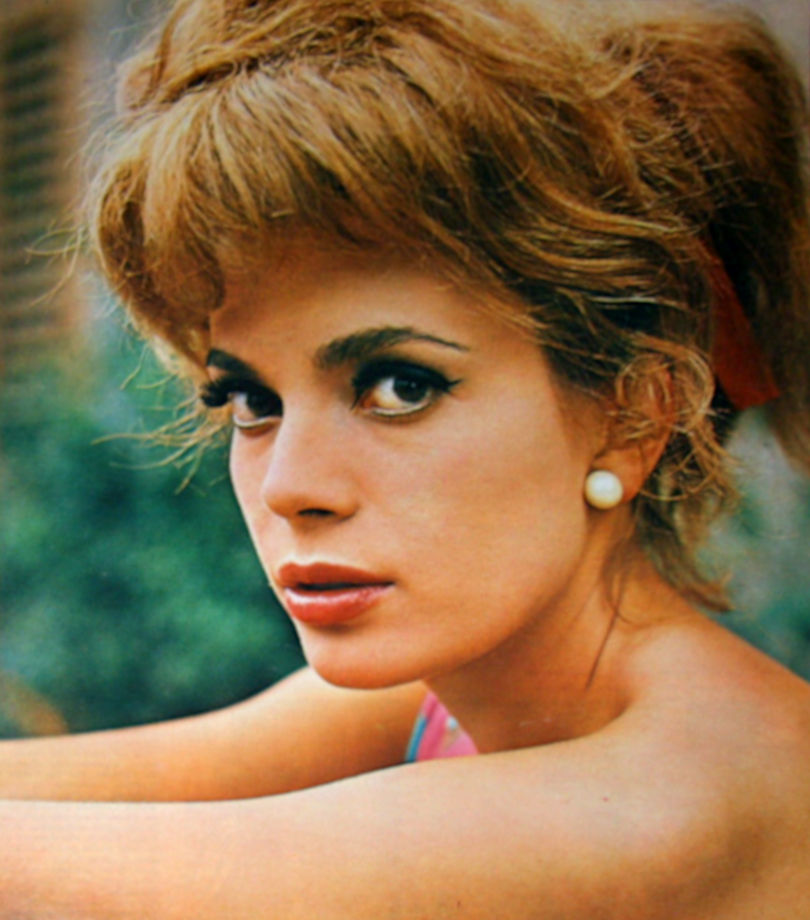
Careddu in 1967

Stefania Careddu (born 13 January 1945) is an Italian retired film and stage actress.

== Life and career ==
Born in Bergamo, Careddu is the daughter of the writer Marianna Frigeni. She made her film debut in 1965, in a small role in Gianni Puccini's I soldi, and the following year she had her first role of weight in Nelo Risi's Andremo in città. After several supporting roles, including some Spaghetti Westerns in which she was credited as Kareen O'Hara, Careddu retired from acting.

== Selected filmography ==
- I soldi (1965)
- Andremo in città (1966)
- Any Gun Can Play (1967)
- Don Juan in Sicily (1967)
- Your Turn to Die (1967)
- Johnny Hamlet (1968)
- Temptation (1968) : Danielle Laroche
- When Women Were Called Virgins (1972)
- Il marito in collegio (1977)
