= Leigh McCloskey =

American artist, author and actor (born 1955)

- McCloskey in 1979
- Born: Leigh Joseph McCloskey; June 21, 1955 (age 71); Los Angeles, California, U.S.
- Other name: Leigh J. McCloskey
- Education: Juilliard School
- Occupations: Actor; artist; author; teacher; visual philosopher
- Years active: 1975–present
- Spouse: Carla Reinke McCloskey (m. 1978)

Leigh Joseph McCloskey (born June 21, 1955) is an American artist, author, actor and self-described "visual philosopher". He is known for the immersive, hand-painted library installation The Hieroglyph of the Human Soul (sometimes abbreviated THOTHS), created in his Malibu home as an ongoing visual–philosophical environment beginning in 2001. His pen-drawn tarot cycle was published as Tarot ReVisioned (2003), and imagery from his illuminated books Codex Tor was used on the cover and packaging of Flying Lotus’s album Cosmogramma (2010). McCloskey delivered the 2024 commencement address at Pacifica Graduate Institute in Santa Barbara, California.

== Career ==
=== Visual art and THOTHS ===
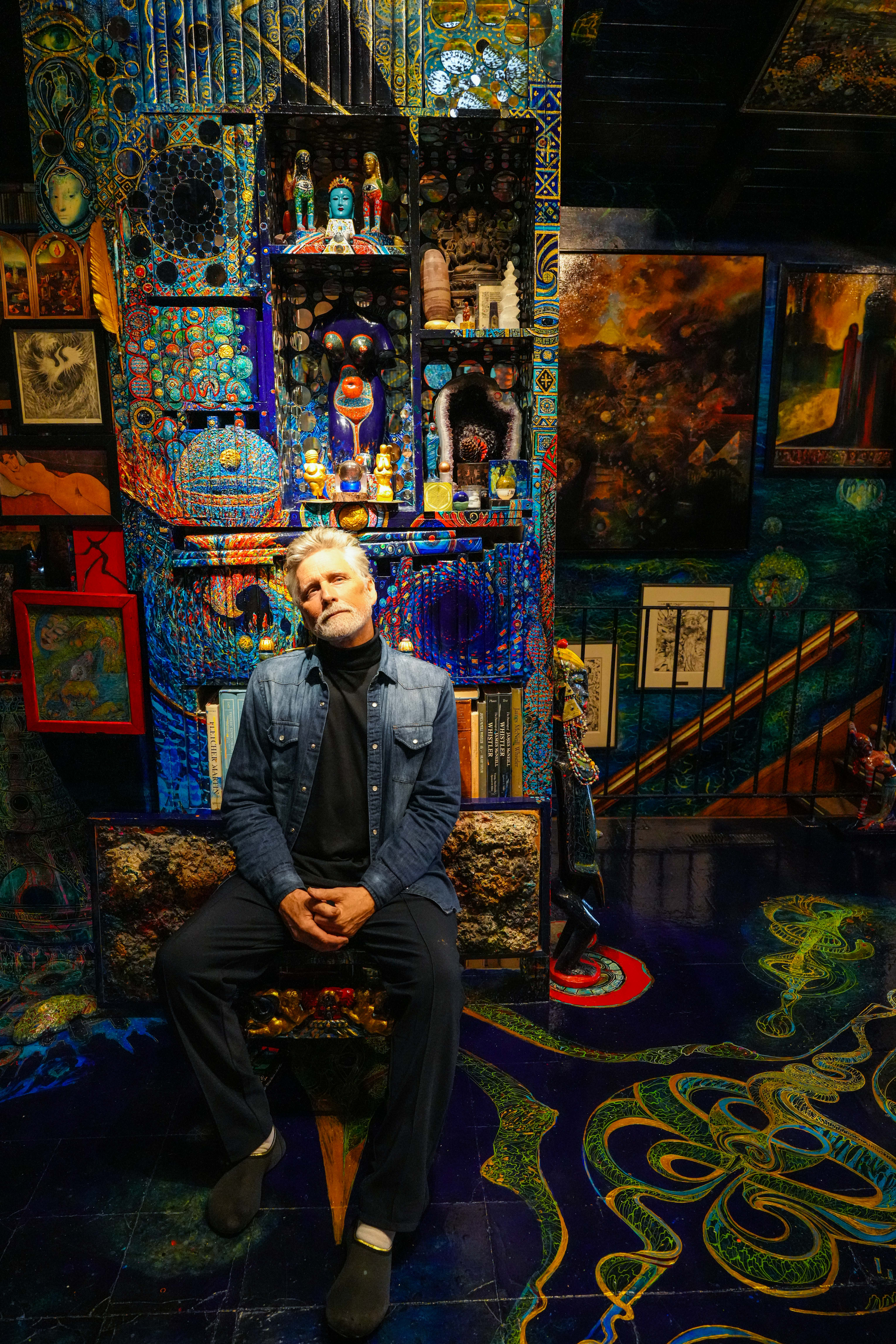
McCloskey with his collection of visual art.

McCloskey’s Hieroglyph of the Human Soul transforms his library into an all-over, 3D painted environment that he also uses for salons and teaching. Coverage in PBS SoCal’s Artbound details the work’s origins, alchemical motifs, and its domestic, immersive setting. A 2024 profile in The Malibu Times documented a city gallery exhibition of his paintings and described his oeuvre as “phenomenally intriguing”, situating it within Malibu’s arts community.

McCloskey has presented visual-philosophy talks and seminars in the United States and abroad. He spoke for the New York Open Center’s Esoteric Quest in 2006 (Central Europe program), where his session connected hermetic philosophy, tarot and image-based inquiry.

In 2012, he gave a TEDxMalibu talk, “The Painting Phoenix Arise & the Blossoming of Creation”, using his oil painting Phoenix Arise as a demonstration of process, pattern and self-revelation through art.

== Filmography ==
Year	Title	Role	Notes
1975	Phyllis	Donald Ralson	1 episode "Bess, Is You a Woman Now?"
1975	The Secrets of Isis	Bill Cady	1 episode "The Sound of Silence"
1976	Medical Center	Mihail Zankov	1 episode "A Very Private War"
1976	Rich Man, Poor Man	Billy Abbott	1 episode "Part VIII: Chapters 11 and 12"
1976	The Streets of San Francisco	Gil	1 episode "Most Likely to Succeed"
1976	ABC Afterschool Specials	Jeff	1 episode "Blind Sunday"
1976	Rich Man, Poor Man Book II	Billy Abbott	Television miniseries
1976	Dawn: Portrait of a Teenage Runaway	Alexander Duncan	Television movie
1976–77	Executive Suite	Brian Walling	18 episodes
1977	Alexander: The Other Side of Dawn	Alexander Duncan	Television movie
1977	Hawaii Five-O	Ted Bonner	1 episode "Tsunami"
1978	The Bermuda Depths	Magnus Dens	Television movie
1978	Doctors' Private Lives	Kenny	Television movie
1979	The Paper Chase	Paul Chandler	1 episode "The Man in the Chair"
1979	Married: The First Year	Billy Baker	4 episodes
1979	Buck Rogers in the 25th Century	Jalor Davin	1 episode "Cruise Ship to the Stars"
1980	Inferno	Mark Elliot	
1980–88	Dallas	Mitch Cooper	46 episodes
1981	Hart to Hart	Vernon Casper	1 episode "Hartland Express"
1983	Hearts and Armour	Rinaldo	
1983	The Fall Guy	Webb Covington Jr.	1 episode "Pirates of Nashville"
1983–85	The Love Boat	Peter / Ralph Burrows / Charles 'Chip' Reynolds	Multiple episodes
1983–86	Hotel	Hank Miller / Joel Shubert / Lou Valentine	3 episodes "Scapegoats", "Passports", "Secrets"
1984	Mickey Spillane's Mike Hammer	Carl Pennington	1 episode "Vickie's Song"
1984	Fantasy Island	Paul Spenser	"Sing Melancholy Baby/The Last Dogfight"
1984	Velvet	James Barstow	Television movie
1984	Partners in Crime	Casey Quinn	1 episode "Murder in the Museum"
1984	Finder of Lost Loves	Travis Burke	1 episode "White Lies"
1985	Fraternity Vacation	Charles 'Chas' Lawlor III	
1985	Just One of the Guys	Kevin	
1986	Hamburger: The Motion Picture	Russell Proco	
1986	Murder, She Wrote	Todd Amberson	1 episode "Murder by Appointment Only"
1986	Blacke's Magic	Paul Thompson	1 episode "The Revenge of the Esperanza"
1986	Crazy Like a Fox	Bob Beyers	1 episode "The Duke Is Dead"
1987–92	Jake and the Fatman	Glen Latimer / Hank Goldman	2 episodes "The Man I Love", "Nightmare"
1987	Dirty Laundry	Jay	
1988	Sonny Spoon	Dick Darling	1 episode "Wizard of Odds"
1988	The Bronx Zoo	Richard	
1988	Cameron's Closet	Pete Groom	
1988	Double Revenge	Mick Taylor	
1988	Lucky Stiff	Eric West	
1988–90	Santa Barbara	Dr. Zach Kelton / Ethan Asher	248 episodes
1990	Shades of L.A.	Dr. Ernest Lindstrom	1 episode "The Teacher from Hell"
1992	Life Goes On	Phillip Jorgens	1 episode "The Whole Truth"
1993	Raven	Pirate / Randall	2 episodes "Rip-Off", "Bloody Beach"
1993	Trouble Shooters: Trapped Beneath the Earth	Frank Mather	Television movie
1993–96	General Hospital	Dr. Michael Baranski / Damian Smith	Multiple episodes
1994	Accidental Meeting	Richard	Television movie
1994	Chicago Hope	Soap Doctor	1 episode "Death Be Proud"
1995	Terror in the Shadows	Alex Williams	Television movie
1996	Star Trek: Voyager	Tieran	1 episode "Warlord"
1996–97	The Young and the Restless	Dr. Kurt Costner	16 episodes
1997	3rd Rock from the Sun	Matthew	1 episode "Tricky Dick"
1997	Almost Perfect	Tommy	1 episode "The Laws"
1998	Babylon 5	Thomas	2 episodes "A Tragedy of Telepaths", "Phoenix Rising"
1998	I Might Even Love You	Hank Price	
1999	JAG	Dan Lander	1 episode "War Stories"
1999	Star Trek: Deep Space Nine	Joran Belar	1 episode "Field of Fire"
1999	Beverly Hills, 90210	Bigelow	1 episode "Fortune Cookie"
2000	Brutally Normal	Corey	1 episode "Stretching Ethics"
2000	One Life to Live	Drake Faraday	
2005	Gone, But Not Forgotten	Detective Ross Barrow	Television miniseries
2009	An Elaborate Plan	Donald Cavanaugh	Short subject
2011	Bones	Lee Coleman	1 episode "The Truth in the Myth"
2013	The Young and the Restless	Dr. Kurt Costner	16 episodes
2026	The Dresden Sun	Jack Wellman	
