= Diary of a Schizophrenic Girl =

- Directed by: Nelo Risi
- Written by: Nelo Risi; Fabio Carpi
- Produced by: Gian Vittorio Baldi
- Starring: Ghislaine D'Orsay; Margarita Lozano
- Cinematography: Giulio Albonico
- Edited by: Otello Colangeli
- Music by: Ivan Vandor
- Production companies: IDI Cinematografica; RAI
- Distributed by: Medusa Distribuzione (Italy); Allied Artists (US)
- Release dates: 1968 (Venice); April 1970 (New York)
- Running time: 109 minutes
- Country: Italy
- Language: Italian

Diary of a Schizophrenic Girl (Italian: Diario di una schizofrenica) is a 1968 Italian drama film directed by Nelo Risi. It is based on the non-fiction book Journal d'une schizophrène by Marguerite Sechehaye. The film was awarded the Nastro d'Argento for best screenplay.

== Cast ==
- Ghislaine D'Orsay as Anna
- Margarita Lozano as Bianca
- Umberto Raho as Mr. Zeno
- Gabriella Mulachiè as Mrs. Zeno
- Sara Ridolfi as nurse
- Giuseppe Liuzzi as doctor
- Manlio Busoni as doctor
- Marija Tocinoski

== Release ==
The film was shown at the 1968 Venice Film Festival. It was claimed that the film was also shown to the public during the festival and in Milan before 31 October 1968, however, the Academy of Motion Picture Arts and Sciences ruled that these showings did not constitute a commercial release and ruled the film ineligible as the Italian entry for the Academy Awards.

== Reception ==
Shortly after its Venice premiere, Giovanni Grazzini of the Corriere della Sera called Risi's film "perhaps the first Italian film on the merits of psychoanalysis that is able to achieve the double objective of intelligent dissemination and spectacular effectiveness". The Segnalazioni cinematografiche pointed out Risi's "forceful" style, which, the film's "didactic and scientific intentions" notwithstanding, managed to create an intimate human drama that evokes the viewer's participation.

In his April 1970 article for the New York Times, critic Roger Greenspun titled Diary of a Schizophrenic Girl "a tactfully realized film", pointing out the "clarity of Nelo Risi's images" and "lucidity of Ghislaine D'Orsay's performance" which "excells every other performance I have seen in recent movies".
