= Ivan Vandor =

Hungarian-born Italian composer, musician, and ethnomusicologist (1932–2020)

Ivan Vandor (13 October 1932 – 15 November 2020) was an Italian composer, musician and ethnomusicologist of Hungarian origin.

== Life ==
Born in Pécs, Vandor moved to Rome, Italy with his family in 1938.

He began studying the violin at 6 and piano at 8, and, from 1948 to 1954, was tenor sax in the group Roman New Orleans Jazz Band. He was later also a member of the avant-garde groups Musica Elettronica Viva and Gruppo di Improvvisazione di Nuova Consonanza. In 1959, he graduated in Composition with Goffredo Petrassi at the Santa Cecilia Conservatory and in 1962 he obtained Italian citizenship.

Having graduated in ethnomusicology from U.C.L.A., he authored several books and essays. His compositions include several notable soundtracks, such as Mino Guerrini's Date for a Murder (1967), Giulio Questi's Django Kill (1967), Nelo Risi's Diary of a Schizophrenic Girl (1968) and Michelangelo Antonioni's The Passenger (1975).

An album of his chamber works is published on the label Stradivarius.
