= Faces (1968 film) =

1968 film by John Cassavetes

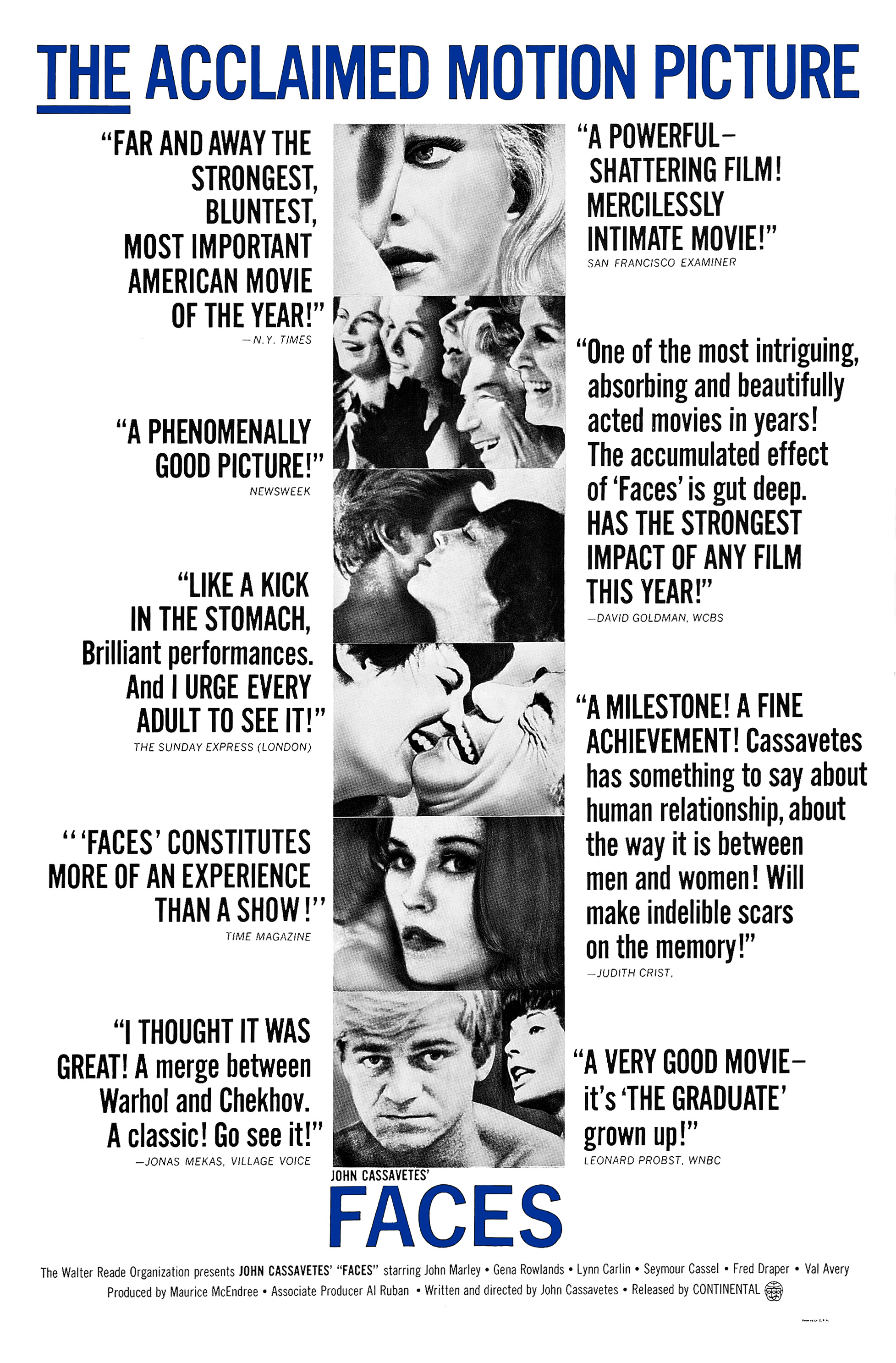
- Theatrical release poster
- Directed by: John Cassavetes
- Written by: John Cassavetes
- Produced by: Maurice McEndree; John Cassavetes (Note: uncredited)
- Starring: John Marley; Gena Rowlands; Lynn Carlin; Seymour Cassel; Fred Draper; Val Avery
- Cinematography: Al Ruban; Haskell Wexler (Note: uncredited)
- Edited by: Al Ruban; Maurice McEndree; John Cassavetes (Note: uncredited)
- Music by: Jack Ackerman
- Distributed by: Continental Distributing
- Release dates: April 5, 1968 (Montreal premiere); November 24, 1968 (U.S.)
- Running time: 183 minutes (premiere cut); 130 minutes (release/director's cut)
- Country: United States
- Language: English
- Budget: $275,000

Faces is a 1968 American drama film written, produced, and directed by John Cassavetes—his fourth directorial work. It depicts, shot in cinéma vérité-style, the final stages of the disintegrating marriage of a middle-aged couple, played by John Marley and newcomer Lynn Carlin. Cassavetes regulars Gena Rowlands, Seymour Cassel, Fred Draper, and Val Avery also star.

At the 29th Venice International Film Festival, the film won the Pasinetti Prize and the Best Actor Award (for Marley). At the 41st Academy Awards, it received three Oscar nominations: Best Original Screenplay, Best Supporting Actor (for Cassel), and Best Supporting Actress (for Carlin). Initial critical reception to the film was somewhat polarized, but it went on to gain widespread acclaim, and is now considered one of the most demonstrative and influential works of the New Hollywood movement. In 2011, Faces was selected for preservation in the National Film Registry by the Library of Congress for being "culturally, historically, or aesthetically significant."

== Plot ==
Richard Forst is the middle-aged chairman of the board of a finance corporation. After a meeting about potentially funding a film project, he and his coworker and friend Freddie go to a bar, where they meet some women and go home with Jeannie Rapp, a prostitute. The trio laugh and dance, until Freddie, sensing that Jeannie likes Richard more than him, breaks the mood by asking Jeannie how much she charges. An uncomfortable interaction follows, and Freddie leaves. Richard leaves shortly thereafter, but not before sharing a kiss with Jeannie.

At home, Richard and his wife, Maria, have a conversation about gender politics over dinner that is alternately cold and marked by hysterical laughter. They briefly touch on their relationship before tensely retiring to separate parts of the house, but, after a bit, Richard finds Maria and tells her that he wants a divorce. Her initial laughter fades when he says he is serious, and he calls Jeannie to arrange to meet her and leaves.

After Jeannie fails to meet Richard at a nightclub, he goes to her house, where he finds her and a friend entertaining two businessmen from out of town. As Jeannie had diplomatically been trying to leave to meet Richard, Jim McCarthy, the more senior of the out of town businessmen, invites Richard in, and the jealousy in the air leads to posturing between him and Richard—they even get physical before returning to verbal digs and exchanging old jokes. Eventually, the businessmen leave with Jeannie's friend, who calls another woman for Jim, and Richard and Jeannie spend the night together. He tells her not to get serious, and she tells him that she is starting to have feelings for him.

Meanwhile, Maria and three of her married friends go to the Whisky a Go Go, where they sit and watch the dancers. A young man named Chet comes over and tries to get Maria to dance with him, but she refuses, and her friend Florence gets up instead. The quartet go back to Maria's house, where Chet puts on some music and begins to dance, until Maria turns off the stereo and tries to have a polite conversation. They talk about social norms and the differences between the worldviews of their husbands and Chet's younger generation, and Chet goes along, though he has a hard time keeping a straight face. Florence asks him to get up and dance, and he makes up songs about Florence and Billie Mae to fill the silence. Just as Louise, Freddie's very prim wife, is starting to loosen up, Chet says he feels they are being foolish, offending Louise, who goes home. Billie Mae also leaves, and Florence asks Chet to drive her home. Alone, Maria closes up the house, but Chet returns, and he and Maria make love.

In the morning, Jeannie returns to her bedroom after doing some tidying up to see Richard getting dressed. Feeling that he is slipping away from her, she lightheartedly tries to remind him of how close they were the night before. He asks her to stop being silly and be herself, she says she does not know how else to be, and they part, reciting "Peter Piper" and laughing.

Chet awakens to find Maria unconscious in the bathroom, having attempted suicide by taking an overdose of sleeping pills. Deciding against calling for an ambulance, he puts her in the shower, gives her coffee, walks her around, makes her vomit, and repeatedly slaps her. She gradually revives, and they have a genuine conversation and hold each other. Richard arrives, surprising them, and he catches Chet jumping out the bedroom window. Hypocritically, he becomes furious with Maria for cheating on him, but, worn out after her suicide attempt, she is not intimidated and responds by saying that she hates her life and does not love him. Silent now, Richard gets cigarettes, and he and Maria sit on their staircase like strangers, get up and pass each other without acknowledgement, and go to different floors.

== Cast ==
- John Marley as Richard "Dickie" Forst, Maria's husband
- Gena Rowlands as Jeannie Rapp, a prostitute
- Lynn Carlin as Maria Forst, Richard's wife
- Fred Draper as Freddie, Richard's friend and coworker, and Louise's husband
- Seymour Cassel as Chet, a young man
- Val Avery as Jim McCarthy, a businessman who picks up Jeannie
- Dorothy Gulliver as Florence, Maria's older friend
- Joanne Moore Jordan as Louise, Maria's friend and Freddie's wife
- Darlene Conley as Billy Mae, Maria's friend
- Gene Darfler as Joe Jackson, Jim's subordinate
- Elizabeth Deering as Stella, Jeannie's friend
- George Dunn as the nightclub comedian

== Production ==
Faces was Cassavetes' fourth directorial work, and was entirely self-financed by him and Rowlands, his wife. The cast allegedly worked for no pay, but were promised profit participation. Filming, including protracted rehearsals, took place over the course of eight months in locations throughout Los Angeles, including Cassavetes' house. The film was shot on high-contrast 16 mm black and white film stock between January and June 1965.

Lynn Carlin had no prior acting experience when she was cast as Maria Forst. She was working as a secretary for Robert Altman at the time, and Cassavetes often hired her as a script reader and casting assistant. After she was fired by Altman, Cassavetes cast her in Faces, and her debut performance earned her a nomination for the Academy Award for Best Supporting Actress.

Steven Spielberg worked as an unpaid runner on the film during part of production.

== Versions ==
As is the case with several of Cassavetes' films, several different versions of Faces are known to exist (though it was generally assumed that, after creating the general release print, Cassavetes destroyed the alternative versions). The film was initially screened in Canada with a running time of 183 minutes, after which Cassavetes cut it down to 130 minutes.

While the 130-minute version of the film is the one preferred by Cassavetes and that went into general release, a print of a longer, 147-minute version of the film was accidentally later found by Ray Carney and deposited in the Library of Congress. The opening 17 minutes of this print were included as a special feature in The Criterion Collection's box set John Cassavetes: Five Films, though Carney has said that there are numerous differences between the two films throughout their running times.

== Reception ==
=== Critical reception ===
Roger Ebert gave the film 4 out of 4 stars and wrote that it "tenderly, honestly, and uncompromisingly examines the way we really live". Manny Farber wrote that "Carlin is near perfection, playing the deepest well of unexplored emotions as the wife of a rubber-faced business wow who seems like a detestable ham walk-on until he surprisingly lodges into the film's center for good." Paul Schrader, writing for the Los Angeles Free Press, called Faces "a film with a confused on-screen life, but with a rich cocktail party life-span." Pauline Kael, however, responded negatively to the film, criticizing the "badly performed" acting and "crudely conceived" scenes.

In a retrospective review for Slant Magazine, Jeremiah Kipp wrote: "Cassavetes was interested in actors and their freak-show intensities, and their performances give his films a hyper-real quality." On the review aggregation website Rotten Tomatoes, 85% of 26 critics' reviews of the film are positive, with an average rating of 7.4/10. Metacritic, which uses a weighted average, assigned the film a score of 88 out of 100, based on 16 critics, indicating "universal acclaim".

=== Awards and nominations ===
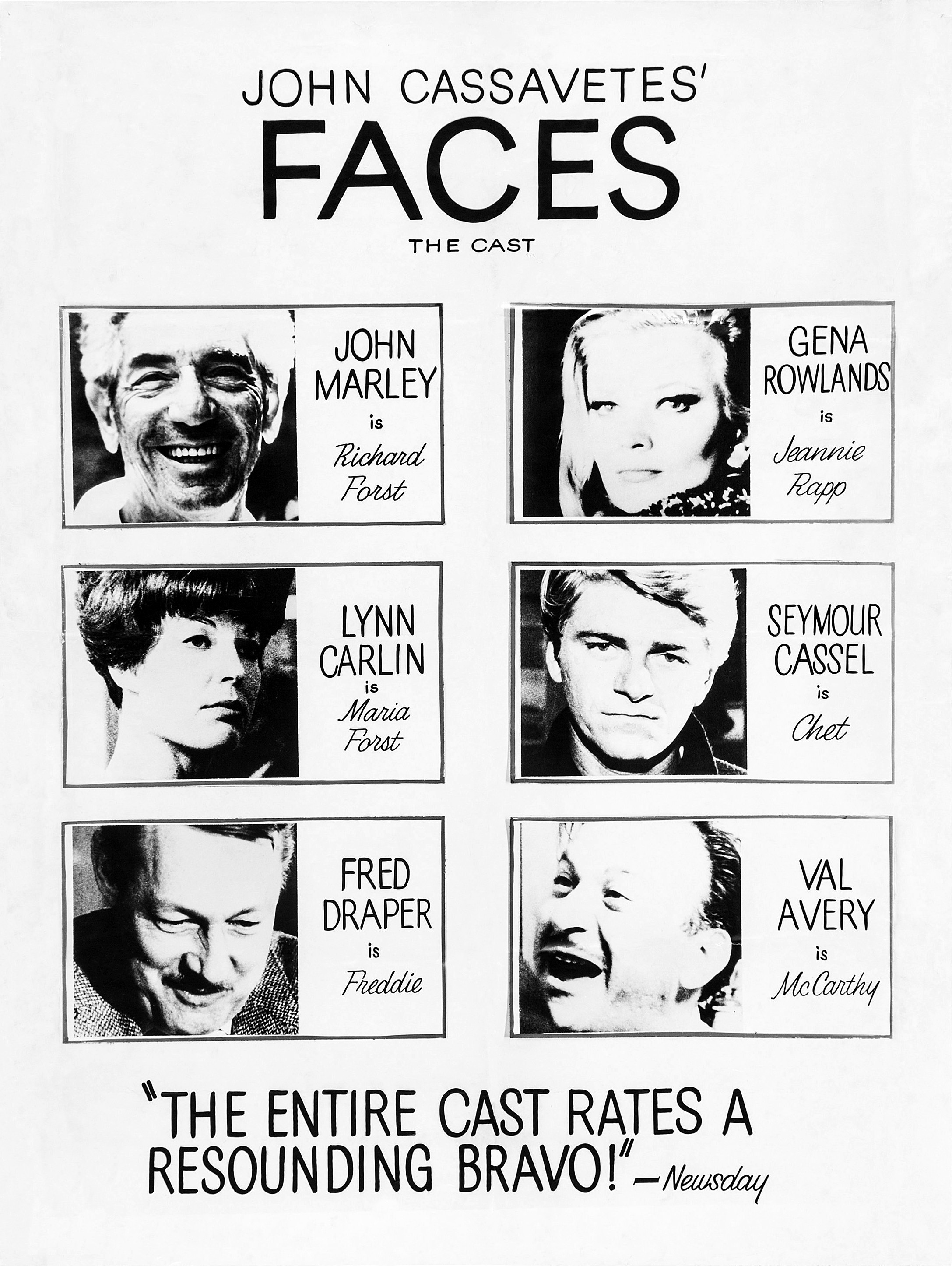
Alternate poster highlighting the film's cast

Award	Category	Nominee(s)	Result
Academy Awards	Best Supporting Actor	Seymour Cassel	Nominated
Academy Awards	Best Supporting Actress	Lynn Carlin	Nominated
Academy Awards	Best Story and Screenplay – Written Directly for the Screen	John Cassavetes	Nominated
National Society of Film Critics Awards	Best Film		2nd Place
National Society of Film Critics Awards	Best Actress	Lynn Carlin	Nominated
National Society of Film Critics Awards	Best Supporting Actor	Seymour Cassel	Won
National Society of Film Critics Awards	Best Screenplay	John Cassavetes	Won
New York Film Critics Circle Awards	Best Film		Nominated
New York Film Critics Circle Awards	Best Director	John Cassavetes	Nominated
Venice International Film Festival	Golden Lion	John Cassavetes	Nominated
Venice International Film Festival	Pasinetti Prize	John Cassavetes	Won
Venice International Film Festival	Best Actor	John Marley	Won
Writers Guild of America Awards	Best Written American Original Screenplay	John Cassavetes	Nominated

=== Recognition ===
In 2011, Faces was selected for preservation in the United States National Film Registry by the Library of Congress as being "culturally, historically, or aesthetically significant". The Registry called the film "an example of cinematic excess", whose extended confrontations revealed "emotions and relations of power between men and women that rarely emerge in more conventionally structured films".

=== Influence ===
Faces—and other Cassavetes projects—had a significant creative impact on Martin Scorsese, Woody Allen, and Robert Altman.

James Benning's Faces (2010) is a found footage remake or reconstruction of Cassavetes' film. It is exactly as long as the original, but consists entirely of silent, slowed-down close-ups of the characters, which are on screen for as the same amount of time as they are in the original.

== See also ==
- List of American films of 1968
- New Hollywood
