= Edith Bruck =

Hungarian-born Italian writer and director

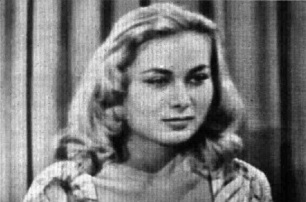
- Bruck in 1957
- Born: Edit Steinschreiber; 3 May 1931 (age 95); Budapest, Hungary
- Occupations: Writer; director
- Years active: 1959–present
- Spouse: Nelo Risi

Edith Bruck (born 3 May 1931) is a Hungarian-born writer, director and Holocaust survivor. She has lived most of her life in Italy and writes in Italian.

== Early life ==
The daughter of poor Jewish parents, she was born Edit Steinschreiber in the village of Tiszabercel near the Ukrainian border. In 1944, with her parents, two brothers and a sister, she was sent to Auschwitz, where her mother died. The family was transferred to Dachau where her father died, then to Christianstadt and finally Bergen-Belsen, where the remaining children were liberated by the Allies in 1945. One brother also died in the concentration camps. She returned to Hungary and then went to Czechoslovakia, where another sister was living with her family.

== Career ==
Bruck is a transnational Italian writer and the author of two dozen novels, short story collections, books of poetry and works of nonfiction. Most of her literary production has been devoted to Holocaust testimony, and she has also written several novels about her long marriage to Italian writer and film director Nelo Risi.

Since 1959, five years after settling in Italy while with a dancing troupe, her works of literature have been published in Italian. In 1959, Bruck published her autobiography Chi ti ama così, later translated as Who loves you like this (2001).

Her 1974 short story collection Due Stanze Vuote was a candidate for Italy's Strega literary prize.

In 1971, Bruck wrote her first play, Sulla porta. Bruck was a co-founder of the Teatro della Maddalena theatre in Rome, where Mara, Maria, Marianna (co-written with Dacia Maraini and Maricla Boggio) opened in 1973. From the 1970s to the 1990s, she worked for the RAI as a director and screenwriter.

In 1989 Bruck won the Rapallo Carige Prize for Lettera alla madre, and in 2009 she was awarded the Viareggio Prize for Quanta stella c’è nel cielo.

Her autobiographical novel Lost Bread was a finalist for the 2021 Strega Prize. An English translation was published in 2023. In 2023, Bruck was awarded the Premio Campiello literary prize for her career.

Bruck has translated works by the Hungarian poets Attila József, Miklós Radnóti and Gyula Illyés into Italian. Her own work has been translated into other languages including English, Hungarian, Danish, Dutch, German, Hebrew, French and Spanish.

=== Films based on her life and work ===
The 1966 Italian film Andremo in città (We'll Go to the City), directed by Nelo Risi and starring Geraldine Chaplin and Nino Castelnuovo, was based on a short story in Bruck's book of the same name.

The 1982 Hungarian documentary film A látogatás (The Visit), directed by László Révész and based on Bruck's script, recorded her return as a "moral witness" to the village Tiszakarád. She later said that making the film was a "terrible ordeal" but she felt it was her duty.

In 2014, Italian director Roberto Faenza adapted Bruck's novel Quanta stella c’è nel cielo (2009) into the film Anita B.

Bruck was interviewed for the one hour Italian documentary Edith Bruck: The Woman and the Shoah. Released in 2023, the film explores her life as a Holocaust survivor and writer. Bruck seems to narrate most of the film since the interviewer and interview questions aren't included. The film, which was directed by Michele Mally, includes archival footage of Bruck's husband Nelo Risi. The doc also features Risi's nephew Marco Risi (an Italian filmmaker and son of Italian film director Dino Risi) and Bruck's niece Deborah Taub. The doc became available for streaming on Kanopy in 2025 with English subtitles.

== Personal life ==
When she was 16, she married Milan Grün and moved to Israel; the couple divorced the following year. She then married Dany Roth, but that marriage also ended in divorce. She next married an acquaintance named Bruck to postpone her compulsory military service; she had divorced him by the time she was 20 but kept his surname. In 1954, Bruck moved to Rome and later married Italian writer and director Nelo Risi.

== Selected works ==
- Chi ti ama così, novel (1959) (Who Loves You Like This (2001) tr. Thomas Kelso)
- Andremo in città, short stories (1962), title story adapted as a film in 1966
- Due stanze vuote, short stories (1974), finalist for the Strega Prize
- Per il tuo bene, play (1975)
- Mio splendido disastro, novel (1979)
- Lettera alla madre, epistolary novel, (1988), received the Rapallo Carige Prize
- Nuda proprietà (1993), finalist for the Strega Prize
- Il silenzio degli amanti, novel (1997)
- L’amore offeso, novel (2002)
- Quanta stella c’è nel cielo, novel (2009), received the Viareggio Prize, adapted to film as Anita B.

== English translations ==
- Who Loves You Like This, translated by Thomas Kelso (Paul Dry Books, 2001) ISBN 9780966491371
- Lost Bread, translated by Gabriella Romani and David Yanoff (Paul Dry Books, 2023) ISBN 9781589881785
- This Darkness Will Never End, translated by Jeanne Bonner (Paul Dry Books, 2025) ISBN 9781589882010

== Filmography ==
- Improvviso, director (1979)
- Quale Sardegna?, director (1983)
- Fotografando Patrizia, writer (1984)
- Altare per la madre, director (1986)
- Per odio per amore, writer (1991)
