= One Hamlet Less =

1972 film

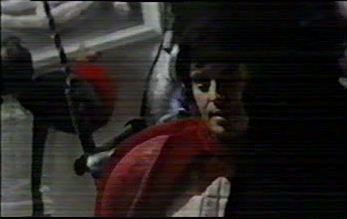
- An image of one hamlet less
- Directed by: Carmelo Bene
- Written by: Carmelo Bene
- Based on: Hamlet by William Shakespeare
- Produced by: Anna Maria Papi
- Starring: Carmelo Bene
- Narrated by: Carmelo Bene
- Cinematography: Mario Masini
- Edited by: Mauro Contini
- Music by: Carmelo Bene
- Release date: 21 May 1973
- Running time: 70 minutes
- Country: Italy
- Language: Italian

One Hamlet Less (Italian: Un Amleto di meno) is a 1973 Italian drama film directed by Carmelo Bene. It was entered into the 1973 Cannes Film Festival.

== Plot ==
Carmelo Bene is the director of a theater company that runs around various theaters in Europe, staging William Shakespeare's Hamlet. He himself also appears in real life to behave as the Prince of Denmark disinherited by his uncle and the whole of society; so immediately these situations merge with the actual plot of Shakespeare's work. Hamlet becomes an inept and becomes aware of it, although he manages to recover his throne usurped by the cruel uncle Claudio who killed his father. Kate is the only reason for life for Hamlet who, after her untimely death, celebrates her a curious funeral, declaring to the grave that she did well to die, not to exist thanks to his help.

== Cast ==
- Carmelo Bene as Hamlet
- Luciana Cante as Gertrude
- Sergio Di Giulio as William
- Franco Leo as Horatio
- Lydia Mancinelli as Kate
- Luigi Mezzanotte as Laertes
- Isabella Russo as Ophelia
- Giuseppe Tuminelli as Polonius
- Alfiero Vincenti as Claudius
