= Chimera (Star Trek: Deep Space Nine) =

- Star Trek: Deep Space Nine episode
- Episode no.: Season 7 Episode 14
- Directed by: Steve Posey
- Written by: René Echevarria
- Production code: 564
- Original air date: February 15, 1999

Guest appearance
- Garman Hertzler as Laas

Episode chronology
| ← Previous "Field of Fire" | Next → "Badda-Bing Badda-Bang" |
- Star Trek: Deep Space Nine season 7

"Chimera" is the 14th episode of the seventh season of Star Trek: Deep Space Nine, the 164th episode overall.

Set in the 24th century, the series follows the adventures of the crew of the Starfleet-managed Bajoran space station Deep Space Nine. The later seasons of the series follow a war between the United Federation of Planets and an expansionist empire known as the Dominion, ruled by the shape-shifting Changelings. Deep Space Nine's security chief, Odo (played by René Auberjonois), is a Changeling who grew up ignorant of his people, and turned his back on them once he learned they were the Founders of the Dominion. In this episode, Odo meets another Changeling, Laas (played by J. G. Hertzler), who is also ignorant of the Founders and tries to persuade Odo to leave Deep Space Nine and travel the galaxy with him.

== Plot ==
While returning to Deep Space Nine, a runabout carrying Odo and Chief Miles O'Brien is boarded by an unfamiliar Changeling. This Changeling, who calls himself Laas, has no knowledge of the Dominion or its Founders, but is eager to learn from Odo about his kind. Odo infers that Laas, like himself, is one of 100 Changelings the Founders sent into the galaxy as infants in order to learn about the universe.

On DS9, the two Changelings discuss their past. Laas tells Odo that although he does not support the Founders' agenda of conquest, he does not trust humanoids and just wishes to avoid them. Odo introduces Laas to the practice of "linking": physically joining their liquid bodies, a very fulfilling experience for Changelings. Laas guesses that Odo would have returned to join the Founders and experience their Great Link had he not fallen in love with Bajoran officer Kira Nerys.

Laas attempts to convince Odo to embrace his potential as a Changeling rather than trying to blend in with humanoids, and behaves rudely and condescendingly toward Odo's humanoid friends. He suggests that Odo join him to travel the galaxy in order to find more of the Hundred and form their own Great Link. Odo is tempted, especially when Laas demonstrates his skill at shapeshifting into unusual forms.

Laas causes a disturbance when he transforms into a fog in the station's Promenade district, drawing the attention of two Klingon officers. Seeing what they assume is a Founder, they confront Laas violently; by shapeshifting he is able to escape the attack and kill one of the Klingons.

Laas is arrested for killing the Klingon, although Odo protests that he acted in self-defense. Laas doubts he will receive a fair trial, given humanoids' inherent mistrust of Changelings. Kira, who loves Odo and wants to give him the opportunity to travel with his own kind, frees Laas and tells everyone that he escaped. Privately, she lets Odo know that Laas is waiting on Koralis III. Odo meets Laas on Koralis, but tells him that he is wrong to believe that "solids" cannot be trusted, and that he is staying with Kira. Back on DS9, Kira tells Odo that he doesn't have to pretend to be a humanoid with her. He shows his love for her by transforming into a glowing golden mist, surrounding her.

== Casting ==
Actor J. G. Hertzler, who played Laas, also played the recurring role of the Klingon General Martok on Deep Space Nine. Hertzler was surprised they hired him for the role, and he attempted to disguise his voice but many people still recognized it. According to showrunner Ira Steven Behr, Hertzler was cast because the producers needed an actor of a caliber to match Auberjonois's performance as Odo, and felt most comfortable trusting the role to an actor they already knew. Since he plays a different role than usual in this episode, Hertzler opted to be credited onscreen as "Garman Hertzler", using his middle name, to ensure Laas was regarded as distinct from Martok.

== Reception ==
Zack Handlen, writing for The A.V. Club in 2014, gave the episode a mixed review; he appreciated the depth of Odo's characterization and the conclusion of the episode, but criticized the episode as repetitive in the context of other episodes about Odo's conflicted relationship with other Changelings. Writing for Tor.com in 2015, Keith R.A. DeCandido gave the episode a rating of 7/10, singling out for praise both the writing and the performance of the character Laas, but argued that the humanoids' mistrust of Laas should have been taken more seriously in the context of the war against the Dominion.

In 2018, SyFy recommend this episode for its abbreviated watch guide for the character of Kira Nerys, noting that although the episode is mainly focused on Odo and Laas, it also illuminates Kira through her love for Odo.
