= The Infamous Column =

- Directed by: Nelo Risi
- Written by: Nelo Risi; Vasco Pratolini
- Story by: Alessandro Manzoni
- Starring: Helmut Berger; Vittorio Caprioli; Francisco Rabal
- Cinematography: Giulio Albonico
- Music by: Giorgio Gaslini
- Release date: 1973
- Country: Italy
- Language: Italian

The Infamous Column (Italian: La colonna infame, also known as Pillar of Shame) is a 1973 Italian historical drama film directed by Nelo Risi.

== Plot ==
It is 1630, and a devastating plague has descended upon the city of Milan. Guglielmo Piazza and Giacomo Mora are depicted as two city's artisans (really only Mora, a barber, was an artisan while Piazza was a sanitary officer). One day a woman accuses Piazza of being an untore (literally, a 'greaser'): a spreader of disease by anointing walls and furnitures with a pestiferous ointment. According to a superstitious belief held by the people, these untori were in league with the Devil, and were responsible for the spread of the pestilence.

Immediately the Church and the Inquisition scapegoat the two artisans for the outbreak, and subject them to trial by torture, despite the protests of Cardinal Borromeo.

Innocent victims of a panic which has gripped the populace, Piazza and Mora are found guilty of the imaginary crime of smearing poisonous substances about in the city to induce plague. They are put to death upon the wheel. Afterwards, a pillar (The Infamous Column of the title) is erected in the square which beheld their execution, with a warning for the masses, to guard against eruptions of public hysteria ever again.

== Cast ==
- Helmut Berger: Arconati
- Vittorio Caprioli: Guglielmo Piazza
- Francisco Rabal: Giacomo Mora
- Lucia Bosé: Chiara
- Salvo Randone: Settala
- Sergio Tofano: President of the Senate
- Pierluigi Aprà: Senator Monti
- Annabella Incontrera: Lover of Arcomat
- Feodor Chaliapin Jr.: Cardinal Federico
- Ernesto Colli: Judge
- Martin Balsam

== See also ==
- List of Italian films of 1972
- The Betrothed § Chapters 31–33: Plague
