= Dawn: Portrait of a Teenage Runaway =

1976 television film directed by Randal Kleiser

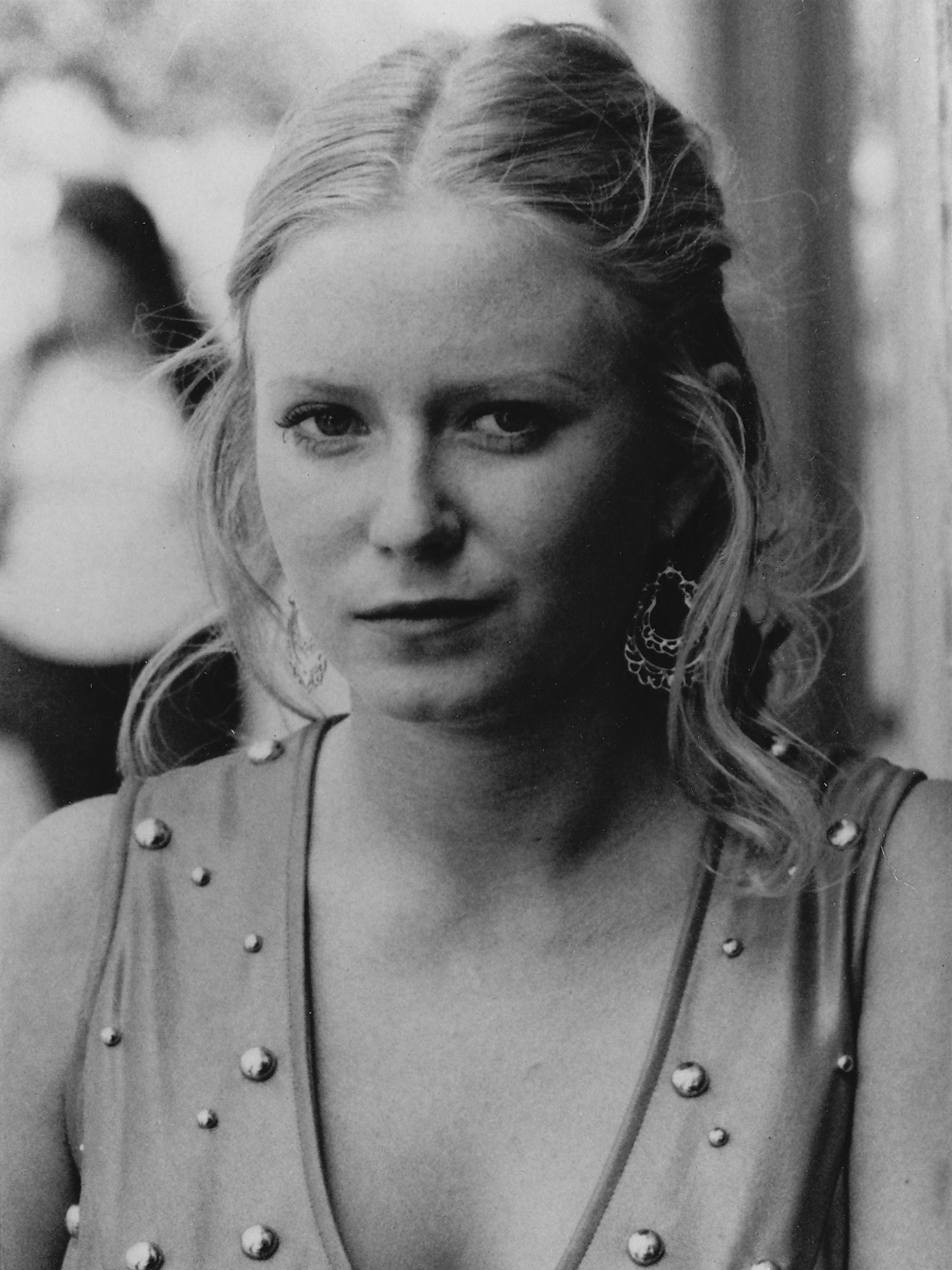
- Eve Plumb as Dawn
- Genre: Drama
- Written by: Dalene Young
- Directed by: Randal Kleiser
- Starring: Eve Plumb; Leigh J. McCloskey; Lynn Carlin; William Schallert
- Theme music composer: Fred Karlin
- Country of origin: United States
- Original language: English

Production
- Producer: Douglas S. Cramer
- Production locations: Tucson, Arizona; Universal Studios - 100 Universal City Plaza, Universal City, California; Gittelson Brothers Hollywood Boulevard Golf Course - 5263 Hollywood Blvd, Hollywood, California; Burbank, California; Hollywood Boulevard & Vine Street, Hollywood, Los Angeles, California; Los Angeles
- Cinematography: Jacques R. Marquette
- Editor: Carroll Sax
- Running time: 120 minutes (with commercials)
- Production company: Douglas S. Cramer Company

Original release
- Network: NBC
- Release: September 27, 1976

Related
- Alexander: The Other Side of Dawn

Dawn: Portrait of a Teenage Runaway is a 1976 American made-for-television drama film which premiered on NBC on September 27, 1976.

The story follows a 15-year-old girl named Dawn Wetherby (Eve Plumb) who runs away from home to Hollywood, California and becomes a prostitute to support herself. Dawn finds herself taken under the wing of a tough-talking pimp named Swan (Bo Hopkins). The film's soundtrack features the song "Cherry Bomb" by The Runaways.

A sequel, Alexander: The Other Side of Dawn (1977), focuses on Dawn's friend and fellow runaway, Alexander Duvall (Leigh McCloskey). Plumb reprised her role as Dawn for the sequel.

== Plot ==
Dawn Wetherby is a 15-year-old girl living in a small community, with her alcoholic mother and two younger brothers. After a humiliating incident involving her mother berating her at a school dance, she decides to run away to Hollywood. She arrives with little money and is unable to find employment due to her young age. She is cheated out of a dollar at a diner and then mugged. She befriends a streetwise young prostitute named Frankie Lee, who helps her retrieve her money from the mugger.

Dawn develops a cough and goes to a clinic, where a young man named Alexander Duncan notices her and introduces himself. He invites her to stay at his apartment with no expectations of payment. Dawn follows Alexander out one night and discovers he is a male prostitute; despite her discovery, she does not mention it. Dawn's naivety leads her to be an easy target for everyone on the street. Her first attempt at prostitution winds up with the client feeling guilty and taking pity on her; he tells her to keep the $20 he gave her and to go back home. Dawn resumes contact with her mother who tells Dawn that she is attending Alcoholics Anonymous meetings, but Dawn refuses to go home.

Feeling panicked when Alex leaves for a few days, Dawn seeks out Frankie Lee and asks to become a prostitute for her pimp, Swan. Swan gains control of Dawn through fear and she begins working for him immediately. Her first customer beats her and refuses to pay the fee, resulting in her phoning Alex. Alex goes to Dawn's motel room where she asks for money to give to Swan. Alex gives her $30, but they end up in an argument over Alex's hypocrisy since he is a male prostitute himself.

Eventually Alex and Dawn reconcile and develop romantic feelings, culminating in a romantic relationship. Alex is a talented artist and has been painting a mural on a wall of his apartment of Alexander the Great; because of this, Dawn wants to buy him an expensive book. She cannot afford the book, and attempts to shoplift it. She is arrested and Swan bails her out. She discovers that Frankie Lee has been killed by a customer. Swan tells Dawn the death is her fault because he had to bail her out rather than protecting Frankie Lee.

A probation officer named Donald Umber tries to help Dawn. She lies to him about everything regarding her life, and he makes little effort to verify anything. In desperation Alex meets Umber to try to save Dawn from herself and Swan, but Umber tells Alex he can do nothing, especially if Dawn does not want to go home or help herself. Umber helps Alex by finding him a job as a stock boy in a large department store, allowing him to cease prostitution. Dawn becomes more emboldened and detached as a prostitute; even after Umber shows her the body of Susie Grey, another of Swan's prostitutes in the morgue, she refuses to go home or leave Swan.

Swan finds Barbie, a new girl, and Dawn is no longer working hotel lobbies looking for clients, having been replaced by Barbie. Instead she assigned to walk the streets to find clients. After another reconciliation between Alex and Dawn while she is working, Swan follows Alex and beats him up. Dawn finds Alex badly bruised in his apartment and calls Umber for help. Despite the beating, Dawn still refuses to leave Swan or give up prostitution, or to go home. Swan tells Dawn that she must move in with him like his other girls.

Alex finally completes his mural. Before Dawn leaves, she pays for the hot water and electricity to be turned on in the apartment. Alex tells Dawn he loves her and they have sex. Afterwards, he gives her a heart pendant necklace. While Alex is sleeping, Dawn sneaks out of the apartment with her clothes, leaving the necklace behind. She returns to Swan's place.

Alex wakes up and realizes that Dawn has left. Finding her at Swan's, he tells Dawn that if she tells him their night together meant nothing to her, then he will leave for good. Dawn tells him she was just using him for shelter and food, but as Alex goes to leave, Dawn confesses that she was lying. Alex and Dawn attempt to escape together. Swan chases them, and confronts Alex with a switchblade, while Dawn runs into the street screaming for help. When an ambulance and police arrive, Swan has disappeared and Alex is injured.

The movie ends with Alex seeing Dawn off at a bus depot. He promises her he will come get her when he has saved enough money. Dawn boards the bus and returns home, where she is picked up by her now sober mother. They walk back inside their house together.

== Cast ==
- Eve Plumb as Dawn Wetherby
- Leigh J. McCloskey as Alexander Duncan
- Lynn Carlin as Mrs. Wetherby
- William Schallert as Harry
- Anne Seymour as Counterwoman
- Joan Prather as Susie Grey
- Marguerite DeLain as Frankie Lee
- Bo Hopkins as Swan
- Georg Stanford Brown as Donald Umber
- David Knapp as Dr. Roberts
- Stephanie Burchfield as Randy
- Kaaren Ragland as Melba
- Anne Ramsey as The Librarian
- Paul Bryar as Counterman
- Queenie Smith as Old Woman
- Paul Sorensen as Sergeant
- Brad Trumbull as The Man
- John Rose as The Salesman
- Romo Vincent as Fat Man
- Sylvia Anderson as Sumi
- Suzanne Crough as Runaway
