= Il marito in collegio =

- Directed by: Maurizio Lucidi
- Written by: Italo Terzoli; Enrico Vaime
- Produced by: Fulvio Lucisano
- Starring: Enrico Montesano
- Cinematography: Aiace Parolin
- Edited by: Renzo Lucidi
- Music by: Armando Trovajoli
- Release date: 1977
- Country: Italy
- Language: Italian

Il marito in collegio (lit. A husband in (boarding) school) is a 1977 Italian comedy film directed by Maurizio Lucidi. It is based on the novel with the same name by Giovannino Guareschi.

== Plot ==
A gas station attendant (Enrico Montesano) falls in love with a Lombard noblewoman (Silvia Dionisio), who agrees to marry him just to get his uncle's inheritance. To polish his manners, he has to go to a boarding school in Switzerland.

== Cast ==
- Enrico Montesano as Camillo Proietti
- Silvia Dionisio as Carlotta
- Anna Proclemer as Donna Leo Madellis
- Mario Carotenuto as Casimiro Zanin
- Stefania Careddu as Robinia
- Pino Caruso as Baron Filippo Pancaldi d'Entreves
- Gastone Pescucci as Giusmaria
- Liana Trouché as Carlotta's mother
- Bombolo as Baron's driver
