= A boccaperta =

Book by Carmelo Bene

A Boccaperta
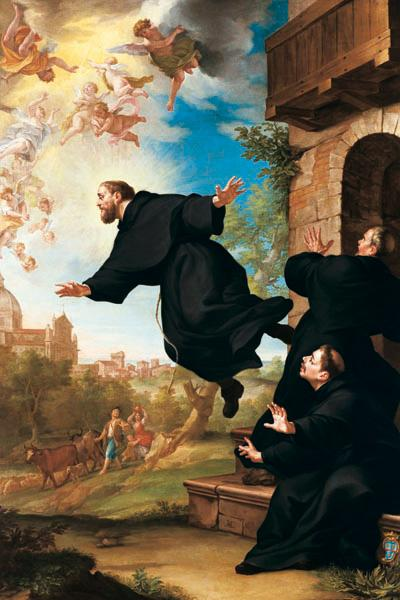
- Portrait of San Giuseppe da Copertino flying
- Author: Carmelo Bene
- Original title: A Boccaperta
- Language: Italian
- Genre: Screenplay
- Publication date: 1976
- Publication place: Italy

A boccaperta, as stated in the work itself, is an Italian screenplay written in 1970 by Carmelo Bene, even though most consider it a novel. In most of Bene's works is hard to recognize a sole genre: he himself defines his own art as "degenerate". It was published in 1976 in bundle with S.A.D.E. and Ritratto di signora del cavalier Masoch per intercessione della beata Maria Goretti. Written for Joseph of Cupertino, Bene's initial idea was to make a movie based on this screenplay, without success, as the production costs would have been prohibitive since theaters would have needed to equip a second screen in order to show Joseph's flights.

== Joseph of Cupertino ==
A boccaperta is about Joseph's half-imaginary, half-legendary life from his birth to his adultness. Since birth, Joseph could levitate. His mother always mistreated and insulted him because of his "butter hands": whatever fragile object he held in his hands, he would drop. While young he went to live in a convent and was put in charge of looking after pigs. Other friars would make fun of him because of his goofiness and his butter hands, often pranking him by making him lift various objects.

"Friar Donkey", as Joseph used to be known as, used to levitate in his room while staring at a painting depicting Virgin Mary. One day his mother came to see him but Joseph disowned her; pointing at the painting he recognized Mary as his real mother. He sometimes found himself levitating while staring at the sky, but every time he did this his superior yelled "Obedience!" to him and he would stop flying, often finding himself on a ledge, crying for help; at this point other friars helped him get down. Sometimes, during his flights, sick and deformed people would hold to his vest, hoping in a miraculous healing. Actually, after having reached a certain height some of them would fall to the ground, dying. One day his Virgin Mary painting was taken from him, in order to prevent him from flying again while looking at it. Saddened but obedient, Joseph accepts this decision.
