= Sergio Di Giulio =

Italian voice actor (1945–2019)

- Born: 4 April 1945; Milan, Italy
- Died: 24 July 2019 (aged 74); Rome, Italy
- Occupations: Actor; voice actor; dialogue writer; dubbing director
- Years active: 1968–2019

Sergio Di Giulio (4 April 1945 – 24 July 2019) was an Italian actor and voice actor.

== Biography ==
Di Giulio was born in Milan on 4 April 1945 and studied at the Alessandro Fersen drama school. In 1968, he made his theater debut with L'estasi e il sangue, directed by Andrea Camilleri. Later, for three years, he attended the Stabile Theatre in Rome.

Di Giulio was notable for dubbing the voices of Timmy's father in the animated show The Fairly OddParents, Dan Aykroyd in Ghostbusters and Jim Belushi in Red Heat. He also served as an actor in the movie One Hamlet Less.
