= I soldi =

1965 film

- Directed by: Gianni Puccini
- Written by: Castellano & Pipolo
- Cinematography: Alfio Contini
- Edited by: Nino Baragli
- Music by: Bruno Canfora
- Release date: 1965
- Running time: 91 minutes
- Country: Italy
- Language: Italian

I soldi is a 1965 Italian anthology comedy film directed by Gianni Puccini.

== Cast ==
- Sylva Koscina as Leda
- Tomas Milian as Bob
- Enrico Maria Salerno
- Alberto Lionello
- Barbara Steele
- Agnès Spaak
- Andrea Checchi
- Carlo Giuffrè
- Maria Grazia Francia
- Mario Pisu
- Gianni Bonagura
- Riccardo Garrone
- Gianni Rizzo
- Umberto D'Orsi
- Paola Quattrini
- Stefania Careddu
- Rocco D'Assunta
- Ignazio Leone
- Sandro Dori
- Enzo Maggio
