= Salome (1972 film) =

Salomè
- Directed by: Carmelo Bene
- Written by: Carmelo Bene
- Produced by: Carmelo Bene
- Starring: Carmelo Bene; Lydia Mancinelli; Alfiero Vincenti; Donyale Luna; Veruschka von Lehndorff; Piero Vida; Franco Leo; Juan Fernández
- Cinematography: Mario Masini
- Edited by: Mauro Contini
- Release date: 20 October 1972
- Running time: 73 min
- Country: Italy
- Language: Italian

Salomè (also known as Salomi) is a 1972 Italian drama film directed and produced by Carmelo Bene. It stars Bene, Lydia Mancinelli, Alfiero Vincenti and Donyale Luna in the lead roles. A psychedelic re-telling of the biblical story, Salome is the daughter of King Herod's second wife. The King is infatuated with her, and after she fails to seduce the prophet John the Baptist, she dances for the King in order to ask for his execution. The story is told with fast cuts, repetitive dialogue and extreme satire. Australian-born composer Ashley Irwin composed the film's music.

== Cast ==
- Carmelo Bene
- Lydia Mancinelli
- Alfiero Vincenti
- Donyale Luna
- Veruschka von Lehndorff
- Piero Vida
- Franco Leo
- Juan Fernández
