= Summit (film) =

1968 drama film

- Directed by: Giorgio Bontempi
- Screenplay by: Giorgio Bontempi
- Starring: Gian Maria Volonté; Mireille Darc
- Cinematography: Erico Menczer
- Edited by: Vincenzo Tomassi
- Music by: Mario Nascimbene
- Release date: 1968
- Language: Italian

Summit (French: Un corps, une nuit) is a 1968 Italian-French drama film written and directed by Giorgio Bontempi, in his feature film debut. It was entered into the main competition at the 29th Venice International Film Festival.

== Cast ==
- Gian Maria Volonté as Paolo
- Mireille Darc as Annie
- Olga Georges-Picot as Agathe
- Carlo De Mejo as Ulrich
- Giampiero Albertini as Berto
- Erika Blanc as Olga

== Production ==
The film marked the debut of former film critic and Paese Sera journalist Giorgio Bontempi, and include several autobiographical life events. Student riots erupted across Europe while the film was being filmed, and Bontempi adapted the shooting schedule to incorporate the events into the production.

== Release ==
The film premiered into the main competition at the 29th edition of the Venice Film Festival.

== Reception ==
Corriere della Sera's Giovanni Grazzini described the film as He described it as a film that echoes Claude Lelouch, is "predictable" and "awkwardly dialogued", yet realistic in its depiction of the protagonist's existentialist unease.
