= Field of Fire (Star Trek: Deep Space Nine) =

- Star Trek: Deep Space Nine episode
- Episode no.: Season 7 Episode 13
- Directed by: Tony Dow
- Written by: Robert Hewitt Wolfe
- Production code: 563
- Original air date: February 8, 1999

Guest appearances
- Art Chudabala as Lt. Hector Ilario; Leigh McCloskey as Joran Belar; Marty Rackham as Chu'lak; Mark Allen Shepherd as Morn

Episode chronology
← Previous "The Emperor's New Cloak"	Next → "Chimera"
- Star Trek: Deep Space Nine season 7

"Field of Fire" is the 163rd episode of the television series Star Trek: Deep Space Nine, the 13th episode of the seventh season. The episode first aired the week of February 8, 1999, and was written by Robert Hewitt Wolfe and directed by Tony Dow.

Set in the 24th century, the series follows the adventures of the crew of the space station Deep Space Nine; the later seasons of the series follow a war between the United Federation of Planets and an empire known as the Dominion. In this episode, station psychologist Ezri Dax investigates a serial killer at work on Deep Space Nine. Ezri, who is symbiotically joined to the long-lived sluglike creature Dax, calls upon the memories of a previous host of the symbiont to assist in the investigation.

== Plot ==
Hector Ilario, a young DS9 crewmember, is found dead in his quarters. Dr. Bashir determines that he was killed by a bullet fired at close range from a TR-116, a prototype rifle design discontinued by Starfleet. Security chief Odo notes that a rifle fired at close range would leave powder burns on the victim, but no such marks are found on Ilario. Engineer Miles O'Brien eventually discovers how the killer gave the bullet a close-range trajectory without being in the same room as the victim—a miniature transporter was fitted to the weapon, beaming the bullet directly to the victim's quarters. Using a targeting sensor, the killer could target victims from anywhere on the station.

Ezri Dax is troubled by memories of Joran, a former host of the Dax symbiont who was himself a murderer. In a dream, Joran tells her he can help her find Ilario's killer. When another officer is murdered in the same way, Captain Sisko asks Ezri to try to profile the killer, and Ezri performs a ritual to summon Joran to the foreground of her consciousness. Joran encourages Ezri to get inside the murderer's mind, going as far as to have her aim a TR-116 at unsuspecting people and contemplate the resulting feeling of power. Encouraged by Joran, she nearly stabs a potential suspect who turns out to be innocent. Sisko is ready to take Ezri off the case, but agrees to give her another chance.

After a third officer is killed, Ezri notices that each victim had a photograph in their quarters of people laughing. Joran and Ezri conjecture that the killer hates laughter—most likely a Vulcan, as Vulcans are known for repressing emotions, and perhaps one who has recently suffered intense psychological trauma. During a chance encounter with a Vulcan named Chu'lak, Joran becomes convinced he is the killer. Researching Chu'lak's background, Ezri discovers that he was one of only six survivors of a vessel destroyed during the Dominion War.

As Ezri targets Chu'lak in his quarters with her TR-116, she sees that he intends to kill her next. The two aim their rifles at one another; Ezri fires first, wounding Chu'lak and throwing off his aim so that his shot misses her. Joran urges her to finish him off, but she calls a medical team instead.

Later, as Ezri performs the ritual to return Joran to her subconscious, he reminds her that he will always be part of her.

== Reception ==
In 2014, Zack Handlen, writing for The A.V. Club, gave the episode a negative review, calling it "a not very good episode" with "lousy plotting" and a trite mystery. Keith R.A. DeCandido, reviewing the episode in 2015 for Tor.com, gave it a rating of 7 out of 10, calling the episode a good use of the character of Ezri Dax. In 2020, Den of Geek listed "Field of Fire" as one of the best stories of Star Trek: Deep Space Nine.
