= Dead of Summer (film) =

- Directed by: Nelo Risi
- Written by: Nelo Risi; Anna Gobbi; Roger Mauge
- Starring: Jean Seberg
- Cinematography: Giulio Albonico
- Music by: Peppino De Luca; Carlo Pes
- Release date: 1970
- Country: Italy
- Language: Italian

Ondata di calore (internationally released as Dead of Summer) is a 1970 Italian drama film directed by Nelo Risi. It is based on the novel Dead of Summer written by Dana Moseley. The film won the Golden Seashell at the San Sebastián International Film Festival.

== Cast ==
- Jean Seberg as Joyce Grasse
- Luigi Pistilli as Doctor Voltera
- Lilia Nguyen as Maid
- Franco Acampora as Bianchi

== See also ==
- List of Italian films of 1970
