= Alexander: The Other Side of Dawn =

1977 television film directed by John Erman

- Paperback tie-in novel cover
- Genre: Drama
- Based on: Characters created by Dalene Young
- Written by: Walter Dallenbach
- Story by: Dalene Young; Walter Dallenbach
- Directed by: John Erman
- Starring: Leigh McCloskey; Earl Holliman; Alan Feinstein; Eve Plumb
- Music by: Fred Karlin
- Country of origin: United States
- Original language: English

Production
- Executive producer: Douglas S. Cramer
- Producer: Wilfred Lloyd Baumes
- Cinematography: Gayne Rescher
- Editor: Neil Travis
- Running time: 96 minutes
- Production company: Douglas S. Cramer Company

Original release
- Network: NBC
- Release: May 16, 1977

Related
- Dawn: Portrait of a Teenage Runaway

Alexander: The Other Side of Dawn is a 1977 American made-for-television drama film directed by John Erman, and a sequel to Dawn: Portrait of a Teenage Runaway (1976). It premiered on NBC on May 16, 1977. Alexander was the last appearance by actress Jean Hagen, who died in August 1977.

== Plot ==
After the ending in the first movie, Alexander Duncan is taken to a hospital where he is being operated on. He has flashbacks of his life, showing how he came to Hollywood as a young man from rural Oklahoma.

In the present day, Alex awakens in the hospital to Dawn Weatherby, and they reaffirm their love to each other. Dawn helps Alex as much as she can when he's discharged from the hospital. Alex convinces Dawn to go back home to her small Arizona town to wait for him to come get her.

Because of his involvement with Dawn's pimp Swan, Alex loses the job that probation Donald Umber got him previously as a stock boy, and he is unable to get another legit job due to his previous prostitution recognition. Desperate and frustrated, Alex resorts to prostitution and gets picked up by an undercover police officer immediately.

At the police station, Alex asks to contact Donald Umber and is overheard by a psychologist named Ray Church. Alex gets released due to Ray signing for him and vouching for his guaranteed court appearance. Ray tells Alex that Umber is no longer in town, but that he's a good friend of his and asks Alex how he knows him. Alex says that Umber helped him and Dawn before.

Ray takes Alex to a youth house for gay men. Alex feels uncomfortable because he is not gay, and he leaves immediately after he gets there. Returning to his apartment, the landlady tells him the rent is overdue. Meanwhile, back in Arizona, Dawn isn't adjusting well to being home, and longs to be with Alex again. While on his way to the post office, Buddy sees Alex on the streets and catches up with him. He convinces Alex to go on a double date with him and one of his clients and her friend. Alex and Buddy go to a nice restaurant, and Buddy lends Alex a nice suit to wear. They enjoy good food and wine, and Alex opens up to his older date Myra about Dawn. Beginning to enjoy himself, he starts to genuinely like Myra and goes back to her home for the night.

The next day, while loitering at an art museum, Alex is noticed by a man named Charles Selby, a professional football player. Selby is a closeted gay man, and he entices Alex with his lavish lifestyle, employing Alex as his current boy-toy. He's making good money under Selby's employment and companionship, but Selby is not naïve to Alex's true intentions and feelings.

Selby and Alex run into Ray at a nightclub, and Ray reminds him of his court appearance. At court, Alex has his charges dismissed and is given a warning. When Alex goes back to Selby's home from court, he sees Selby is enticing a new boy-toy with the same surfer posing photographs he did with Alex. Ray tells Alex that he needs to start thinking about his own life, and he has no cause to be bothered by the new surfer boy since Alex was just hustling Selby anyway.

Ray drops Alex off at the bus depot, where he's bought a ticket to Arizona to get Dawn. As he's on the bus, he sees Dawn on the street. He gets off the bus and runs up to Dawn, telling her he was on the bus coming to get her. The movie ends with Alex telling Dawn that they're going to a new place and will try their luck there.

== Cast ==
- Leigh McCloskey as Alexander Duncan
- Eve Plumb as Dawn Wetherby
- Juliet Mills as Myra
- Jean Hagen as Landlady
- Lonny Chapman as Eddie Duncan
- Earl Holliman as Ray Church
- Alan Feinstein as Charles Selby
- Asher Brauner as Buddy
- Diana Douglas as Clara Duncan
- Pat Corley as Marty
- Frances Faye as Herself
- Alice Hirson as Judge White
- Jonathan Banks as Michael
- Fred Sadoff as Mr. Anders
- Doria Cook-Nelson as Della

== Reception ==
Phil Hall of Film Threat called it "not a great film" but "a breakthrough, of sorts, in LGBT television." He further opined that it "moves quickly under John Erman's crisp direction, and there are a few amusing distractions including a scene at a gay bar where cabaret legend Frances Faye makes a rare TV appearance; Leigh McCloskey was no great actor, but at least he looked good on camera and it was no stretch to imagine every man and woman lusting after his Alexander; mercifully, silly Eve Plumb was given as little screen time as possible."

Film historian Stephen Tropiano wrote that "although its treatment of topics like prostitution, teen runaways, and homosexuality are sensationalistic and heavy-handed, there was at least some attempt made to present a balanced image of gay men." He concludes that in the end, it doesn't matter whether Alex is gay or bisexual, "because he has no trouble closing the door on his gay past and living happily ever after with Dawn."

Film critic John J. O'Connor said the movie "turns out to be well worth watching, primarily because of several exceptionally good performances; Leigh McCloskey gets a surprising amount of effective dramatic shading from a non-promising source of wide-eyed innocence; Earl Hollman is admirably solid and straightforward; Juliet Mills's performance is a dazzling combination of incipient aging and embedded cynicism; and Alan Feinstein manages a very effective balance between genuine warmth and an almost cruel smoothness."

Ann Hodges of The Houston Chronicle disliked the film, calling it a "mawkish sequel, the wages of sin are equally boring." She goes on to say "aside from the embarrassment of watching the actors mired in such sticky dialogue as this script calls for, forget it." Film critic Kevin Thomas said the film's writers "have created some very real people who say things that ring absolutely true and who have been brought to vivid life by some excellent actors under the exceedingly sensitive, beautifully modulated direction of John Erman."

== See also ==
- List of LGBTQ-related films of 1977
- List of made-for-television films with LGBTQ characters
