= Our Lady of the Turks =

Nostra Signora dei Turchi
- Our Lady of the Turks
- Directed by: Carmelo Bene
- Written by: Carmelo Bene (play and screenplay)
- Produced by: Carmelo Bene
- Starring: Carmelo Bene and Lydia Mancinelli
- Cinematography: Mario Masini
- Edited by: Mauro Contini
- Music by: Carmelo Bene (from Modest Mussorgsky and Stanislao Gastaldon)
- Release date: 1968
- Running time: 125 minutes
- Country: Italy
- Language: Italian

Nostra Signora dei Turchi (internationally released as Our Lady of the Turks) is a 1968 Italian drama film. It is the feature film debut of Carmelo Bene and it is based on a stage play by the same Bene. It won the Special Jury Prize at the 1968 Venice Film Festival.

The film was shown as part of a retrospective "Questi fantasmi: Cinema italiano ritrovato" at the 65th Venice International Film Festival.

== Plot ==
A man (Carmelo Bene) cannot bear to be part of the society he lives in. He considers himself a "jerk" and so invents his own philosophy, which involves the destruction of the ways of his native land of Apulia, where all residents are devoted to the Catholic religion. However, the man cannot destroy the belief of the pilgrims of Salento, because a woman prevents him. She is an unknown "Santa Margherita", who tries to turn the man away from what she considers his weird and impossible philosophy. Successive scenes of the film show various dreamlike situations in which the two protagonists try to best each other. After a blasphemous dialogue between monks, the man includes his whole philosophy in a Moorish building. In fact, this seems to have been the scene of the massacre of the famous 800 Martyrs of Otranto, who are considered by the sceptic to be the absolute death of Christianity.
The man, dressed as a medieval knight, tries to find pleasure in amorous adventures with a servant, but fails completely. In fact, it seems that a part of him is tied to something so holy that he cannot stand. The woman in the story has told him that she wants to save him from his own philosophy, but the man has always refused. Now that the man is determined to change and destroy his own philosophy, he discovers that it is too late. Santa Margherita, in the famous Moorish palace, is no longer willing to forgive and to convert the man who, struck down, dies without happiness.

== Cast ==
- Carmelo Bene: the man, or central character
- Lydia Mancinelli: Santa Margherita
- Salvatore Siniscalchi: the editor
- Anita Masini: Santa Maria
