= John Marley =

American actor (1907–1984)

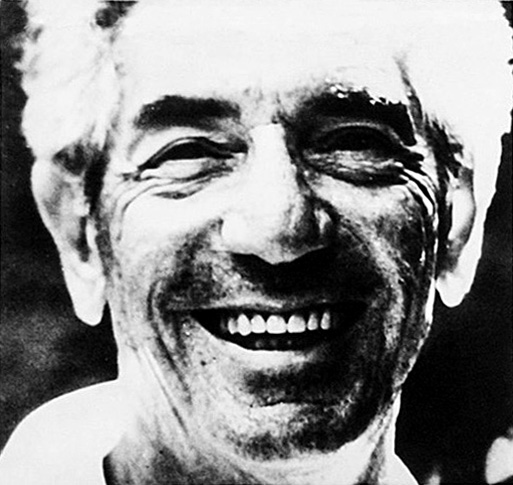
- Marley from a poster promoting Faces (1968)
- Born: Mortimer Leon Marlieb; October 17, 1907; New York City, U.S.
- Died: May 22, 1984 (aged 76); Los Angeles, California, U.S.
- Resting place: Cedar Park Cemetery
- Education: City College of New York
- Occupations: Actor; director
- Years active: 1947–1984
- Spouses: Stanja Lowe (m. 1951; div. 1971); Sandra Marley (m. 1975)
- Children: 4

John Marley (born Mortimer Leon Marlieb; October 17, 1907 – May 22, 1984) was an American actor and theatre director. He won the Volpi Cup for Best Actor at the 29th Venice International Film Festival for his performance in John Cassavetes' Faces (1968), and was nominated for an Academy Award and a Golden Globe Award for his role in Love Story (1970). He was also known to film audiences for his role as Jack Woltz—the defiant film mogul who awakens to find the severed head of his prized thoroughbred horse in his bed—in The Godfather (1972).

== Early years ==
Marley was born in Harlem in New York City to Russian-Jewish immigrant parents. He dropped out of the City College of New York, turning to a career in acting. He served in the U.S. Army Signal Corps during World War II.

== Career ==
=== Film and television ===
Marley was a prolific actor, appearing in nearly 250 films and television series during a career spanning over 45 years. He had roles in TV series that included The Web, Peter Gunn, Johnny Staccato, Bourbon Street Beat, Perry Mason, Rawhide, The Untouchables, Sea Hunt, 77 Sunset Strip, The Lloyd Bridges Show, Dr. Kildare, The Outer Limits, The Alfred Hitchcock Hour, The Twilight Zone, Gunsmoke, The Wild Wild West, Mannix, Bonanza, Ironside, The Name of the Game, The F.B.I., Cannon, McCloud, Kolchak: The Night Stalker, Baretta, Barnaby Jones, and Hawaii Five-0.

He was cast as George Campbell in the 1961 episode "Jerkwater" of the series The Rebel, starring Nick Adams.

In 1962 he played the role of murderer Matthew Owen in the Perry Mason episode "The Case of the Angry Astronaut." He also showed his acting prowess in a supporting but important role of Charlie Rondell in an episode of The Virginian (1968), titled "The Crooked Path."

Marley also played in two other movies where he attained notoriety. One was the cult movie The Car, where he played a sheriff of a small town that was victimized by a mysterious, black automobile.

The second movie was titled Framed, where he played mob boss Sal Viccarone, who befriended a gambler while they were both in prison.

One of Marley's more notable roles, albeit short, was that of film producer Jack Woltz in The Godfather. Marley later spoofed that role in an episode of SCTV Network. He played Max Berns, a film producer who was a caring father figure to Burt Reynolds in the stuntman tribute Hooper.

In the late 1970s, he appeared in the third season of the popular television series The Incredible Hulk as D.W. Banner, the father of David Banner in the episode titled "Homecoming".

=== Stage ===
Marley's Broadway credits include The Investigation (1966), Sing Till Tomorrow (1953), The Strong Are Lonely (1953), Skipper Next to God (1947), and Johnny Doodle (1942). Elsewhere on stage, Marley appeared in the world premiere production of Edna St. Vincent Millay's poetry drama, Conversation At Midnight in 1961 in Los Angeles, in an ensemble cast which included James Coburn, Jack Albertson and Eduard Franz. The production was directed by Robert Gist and produced by Worley Thorne and Susan Davis.

He also directed Little Theater productions in several cities.

== Personal life and death ==
Marley was twice married. He and his first wife, the actress Stanja Lowe, had three children.

In 1984, Marley died at age 76 following open-heart surgery. He is interred at Cedar Park Cemetery in Paramus, New Jersey.

== Filmography ==
Year	Title	Role	Notes
1942	Native Land	Thug With Crowbar	Uncredited
1947	Kiss of Death	Prisoner in Spinning Mill	Uncredited
1948	The Naked City	Managing Editor	Uncredited
1950	Ma and Pa Kettle Go to Town	Second Cab Driver	Uncredited
1951	The Mob	Tony	
1952	My Six Convicts	Knotty Johnson	
1953	The Joe Louis Story	Mannie Seamon	
1955	The Square Jungle	Tommy Dillon, referee	
1956	Time Table	Bobik	
1958	I Want to Live!	Father Devers	
1960	Pay or Die	D. Caputo, ragman	
1960	Sea Hunt		Season 3, Episode 31
1961	Sea Hunt		Season 4, Episode 28
1962	The Twilight Zone	Mr. Cox	Season 3 Episode 21: "Kick the Can"
1963	A Child Is Waiting	Holland	
1963	The Wheeler Dealers	Achilles Dimitros	
1963	America, America	Garabet	
1963	The Alfred Hitchcock Hour	Mr. Mike Chambers	Season 1 Episode 26: "An Out for Oscar"
1963	The Alfred Hitchcock Hour	Detective Ed Singer	Season 1 Episode 32: "Death of a Cop"
1963	The Twilight Zone	Jason	Season 5 Episode 7: "The Old Man in the Cave"
1964	The Alfred Hitchcock Hour	Tony Hardeman	Season 2 Episode 30: "The Second Verdict"
1965	Nightmare in the Sun	Hogan, gas station owner	
1965	Cat Ballou	Frankie Ballou	
1965	The Lollipop Cover	George	
1967	The Wild Wild West	King Stefan IX	Episode: "The Night of the Wolf"
1968	Faces	Richard Forst	
1968	In Enemy Country	Rausch	
1969	Hawaii Five-O	Sam Kalakua	Episode : "The Big Kahuna" (S1, E23)
1970	A Man Called Sledge	Old Man	
1970	Love Story	Phil Cavalleri	nominated—Academy Award for Best Supporting Actor
1970	Hawaii Five-O	Dr. Gregorios Lemira	"The Second Shot"
1971	Clay Pigeon	Police Captain	
1971	The Sheriff	Kinsella	
1971	In Broad Daylight	Bergman	ABC Movie of the Week
1972	The Dead Are Alive	Nikos Samarakis	
1972	The Godfather	Jack Woltz	
1973	Jory	Roy Starr	
1973	Blade	Tommy Blade	
1973	The Alpha Caper	Lee Saunders	ABC Movie of the Week
1974	Deathdream	Charles Brooks	
1975	Framed	Sal Viccarrone	
1975	Kolchak: The Night Stalker	Captain Maurice Molnar	Episode: "Primal Scream"
1976	W.C. Fields and Me	Studio Head Bannerman	
1977	The Car	Sheriff Everett Peck	
1977	Hawaii Five-O	Noah	"Tread the King's Shadow"
1977	Vengeance	Jesus	
1977	The Greatest	Dr. Ferdie Pacheco	
1977	The Private Files of J. Edgar Hoover	Dave Hindley	
1978	Greatest Heroes of the Bible	Moses	
1978	It Lives Again	Mr. Mallory	
1978	Hooper	Max Berns	
1979	The Incredible Hulk	D.W. Banner	Season 3 Episode 8: "Homecoming"
1980	Tribute	Lou Daniels	
1981	Threshold	Edgar Fine	
1981	The Amateur	Molton	
1981	SCTV	Leonard Bernstein	parody of his role in The Godfather but with his character as Leonard Bernstein instead of Jack Woltz
1982	Mother Lode	Elijah	
1983	Utilities	Roy Blue	
1983	Hardcastle and McCormick	Joe Cadillac, "retired" Mafia boss	Season 1 Episode 3: "Man in a Glass House"
1984	The Glitter Dome	Captain Woofer	
1986	On the Edge	Elmo Glidden	Released posthumously (final film role)

== Awards and nominations ==
Year	Award	Category	Work	Result
1968	Venice Film Festival	Best Actor	Faces	Won
1971	Academy Award	Best Supporting Actor	Love Story	Nominated
1971	Golden Globe Award	Best Supporting Actor	Love Story	Nominated
1981	Genie Award	Best Supporting Actor	Tribute	Nominated
