= Carmelo Bene =

Italian actor (1937–2002)

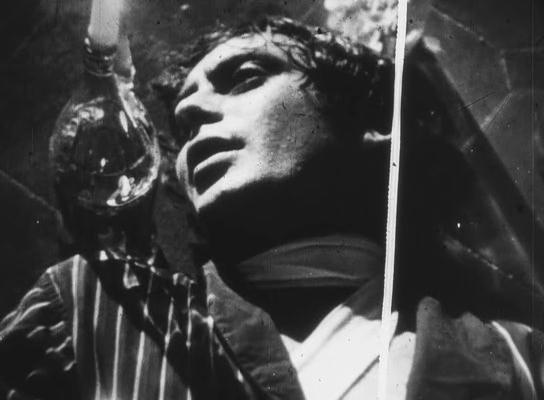
- Bene in Our Lady of the Turks (1968)
- Born: 1 September 1937; Campi Salentina, Italy
- Died: 16 March 2002 (aged 64); Rome, Italy
- Occupations: Actor, theater director, writer, film director, screenwriter
- Years active: 1967–2002
- Spouses: Giuliana Rossi (1960–1965); Raffaella Baracchi (1992–2002; his death)
- Children: 1

Carmelo Pompilio Realino Antonio Bene (1 September 1937 – 16 March 2002) was an Italian actor, poet, film director, and screenwriter. He was an important exponent of the Italian avant-garde theatre and cinema. In 1968, his movie Our Lady of the Turks won the Special Jury Prize (Venice Film Festival) at the Venice Film Festival. He died of a heart ailment in 2002.

== Works ==
=== Literature ===
In 1979 he wrote, in collaboration with French philosopher Gilles Deleuze, the essay "Superpositions". In 1984 his play Adelchi was published. In 1970 he wrote the screenplay A Boccaperta.

- I Appeared to the Madonna, translated with a preface by Carole Viers-Andronico (Contra Mundum Press: 2020)

=== Partial filmography ===
- Oedipus Rex (1967, directed by Pier Paolo Pasolini) - Creonte
- Nostra Signora dei Turchi - Our Lady of the Turks (1968, director, Venice Film Festival Special Jury Prize) - The Man / Narrator
- Catch as Catch Can (1968) - Priest
- Capricci (1969, director) - Poet
- The Syndicate: A Death in the Family (1970) - Billy Desco
- Don Giovanni (1970, director) - Don Giovanni
- Necropolis (1970)
- Tre nel mille (1971)
- Salomè (1972, director) - Erode Antipa / Onorio
- One Hamlet Less (1973, director) - Hamlet
- Claro (1975)

=== Selected bibliography in English ===
- Carmelo Bene, I Appeared to the Madonna, tr. with a preface by Carole Viers-Andronico (New York: Contra Mundum Press, 2020).
- Carmelo Bene, "I am Non-Existent: Therefore I am," tr. by Carole Viers Andronico, Hyperion: On the Future of Aesthetics, Vol. VIII, No. 1 (spring 2014) 37–44.
- Carmelo Bene, “Being in Abandonment: Reading as Non-Memory,” tr. by Rainer J. Hanshe, Hyperion: On the Future of Aesthetics, Vol. VIII, No. 1 (spring 2014) 45–49.
- Carmelo Bene, "Well, yes, Gilles Deleuze!," tr. by Rainer J. Hanshe, Hyperion: On the Future of Aesthetics, Vol. VIII, No. 1 (spring 2014) 50–57.
- Carmelo Bene, Our Lady of the Turks, tr. with a preface by Carole Viers-Andronico (New York: Contra Mundum Press, 2021).
- Gilles Deleuze, "One Manifesto Less," tr. by Alan Orenstein. The Deleuze Reader, ed. by Constantin V. Boundas (New York: Columbia UP, 1993) 204–222.
- Gilles Deleuze, "Cinema, body and brain, thought," in Cinema 2: The Time-Image, tr. by Hugh Tomlinson & Robert Galeta (Minnesota: University of Minnesota Press, 1989) 190–191; 220.
- Gilles Deleuze, "Manfred: an Extraordinary Renewal," in Two Regimes of Madness, tr. by Ames Hodges & Mike Taormina (New York: Semiotext(e), 2006) 188-189.
- Tristan Grünberg, "Outrageous Salome: Grace and Fury in Carmelo Bene’s Salomè and Ken Russell’s Salome’s Last Dance," in Performing Salome, Revealing Stories, ed. by Clair Rowden (Abingdon; New York: Routledge, 2016) 171–189.
- Emilio Villa, "Litany for Carmelo Bene," tr. by Dominic Siracusa, Hyperion: On the Future of Aesthetics, Vol. VIII, No. 1 (spring 2014) 58–67.
- Amos Vogel, "Capricci," in Film as Subversive Art (New York: Random House, 1976).
- Amos Vogel, "Our Lady of the Turks," in Film as Subversive Art (New York: Random House, 1976).
- Amos Vogel, "Don Giovanni," in Film as Subversive Art (New York: Random House, 1976).

== See also ==
- Experimental theatre

== Sources ==
- Umberto Artioli - Carmelo Bene, Un dio assente. Monologo a due voci, Antonio Attisani and Marco Dotti eds., Medusa, Milan, 2006. ISBN 88-7698-051-2
- Giuseppe Leone, "D'in su la vetta della torre antica. Giacomo Leopardi e Carmelo Bene sospesi fra silenzio e voce", Edizioni Il Melabò, Lecco, 2015.
- Giuseppe Leone, "D'in su la vetta della torre antica. Giacomo Leopardi e Carmelo Bene sospesi fra silenzio e voce", II Edizione, Grafiche Rusconi, Bellano-Lecco, 2016.
- Carlo Alberto Petruzzi, Carmelo Bene. Una bibliografia (1959-2018), Damocle edizioni, 2018, 182 pp.
