= Nelo Risi =

Italian poet and film director

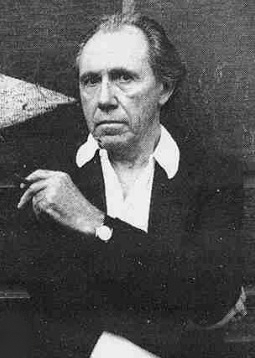
- Risi in 1991
- Born: 21 April 1920; Milan, Italy
- Died: 17 September 2015 (aged 95); Rome, Italy
- Occupations: Poet; film director; translator; screenwriter
- Spouse: Edith Bruck

Nelo Risi (21 April 1920 – 17 September 2015) was an Italian poet, film director, translator and screenwriter, nephew of cinematographer Fernando Risi and younger brother of director Dino Risi.

== Biography ==
Born in Milan, Risi graduated in medicine, as did his brother Dino, then with the outbreak of the Second World War he fought on the Russian front and was interned in Switzerland. He started his poetical production in 1941, with the collection Le opere e i giorni. With the end of the war he moved to Paris where he joined a group of filmmakers, led by the Americans Richard Leacock and John Ferno, engaged in documenting the disaster of the war in Europe through a series of human-geography documentary films. During this time Risi also published his second collection of poems (L'esperienza, 1948) and worked as a translator of poetry works by Pierre Jean Jouve, Constantine P. Cavafy, Sophocles, Jules Laforgue and others.

Back in Italy in 1954, he directed a dozen documentary films on popular figures and moments in the history of the twentieth century. He made his feature film debut in 1961, with a segment of the film Le italiane e l'amore; the same year he started his long collaboration with RAI. During his film career Risi won two Nastro d'Argento, in 1960 for the direction of the short film The Brothers Rosselli (1959) and in 1970 for the screenplay of Diary of a Schizophrenic Girl. In 1970 he also won the Viareggio Prize for his poetry collection Di certe cose che dette in versi suonano meglio che in prosa. His poetry style is referred as "poetics of the usual" (poetica dell'usuale), in reference of the attempt of grasping the contradictions and the mystifications of everyday life through a basic, simple language, close to a diaristic style.

== Selected filmography ==
- Andremo in città (1966)
- Diary of a Schizophrenic Girl (1968)
- Dead of Summer (1970)
- A Season in Hell (1971)
- The Infamous Column (1973)
