= Janet Jones (disambiguation) =

Janet Jones (born 1961) is an American fitness celebrity and actress.

Janet Jones may also refer to:

- Janet Dulin Jones, American screenwriter and producer
- Janet Jones (artist) (born 1952), Canadian artist

== See also ==
- Jan Jones (disambiguation)
- Janette Jones (1931–1989), Scottish nationalist politician
