= The Man in Room 17 =

1960s British television series

- Title card
- Genre: Crime drama
- Created by: Robin Chapman
- Starring: Richard Vernon; Michael Aldridge; Denholm Elliott
- Country of origin: United Kingdom
- No. of series: 3
- No. of episodes: 39

Production
- Running time: 50 minutes

Original release
- Network: Granada TV
- Release: 11 June 1965 – 11 August 1967

Related
- Spindoe

The Man in Room 17 is a British television series which ran for two series in the mid-1960s, then a follow up series The Fellows (Late of Room 17), produced by Granada Television. Key to the series' success was the involvement of writer/producer Robin Chapman. The main characters were "high-IQ" sleuths investigating espionage cases and similarly complex cases.

== Overview ==
The show was set in Room 17 of the Department of Social Research, where former wartime agent-turned-criminologist Edwin Oldenshaw (Richard Vernon) solved difficult police cases through theory and discussions with his assistant (originally Ian Dimmock (Michael Aldridge), later succeeded by Imlac Defraits (Denholm Elliott), owing to Aldridge becoming ill). (The characters of Dimmock and Defraits may have been given the same initials to continue a play on words. Oldenshaw was sometimes identified as Edwin G. Oldenshaw. In the last episode, Oldenshaw and Defraits are in a park, feeding waterfowl, and the camera zooms in on their briefcases, bearing their initials: E.G.O. and I.D.).

The novelty of the series was that Oldenshaw and his colleagues never needed to leave their office in order to resolve cases, preferring to spend their time playing the board game of Go. They simply provided their prognosis and left the police to do the cleaning up. Different directors were often appointed to film the Room 17 and outside-world scenes independently, to maintain a sense of distance between the two worlds.

The rarefied nature of Oldenshaw's work was amplified in 1967 when he returned, re-united with Dimmock, in a new series, The Fellows (Late of Room 17). This series saw the pair relocated to All Saints College, Cambridge University, where they were appointed to the Peel Research Fellowship. Their research was (as it is stated in the series) "to investigate the general proposition that, in a period of rapid social change, the nature of crime (and therefore criminals) would change". Their research led them into encounters (though never physical) with gangland boss Alec Spindoe (Ray McAnally), who eventually ended up behind bars thanks, unknown to Spindoe, to psychological pressure from Oldenshaw. The Spindoe character was to return in his own series, Spindoe in 1968, which charted his attempts to regain his criminal empire after release from prison.

An episode of The Man in Room 17 - the series 2 opener 'How to Rob a Bank - And Get Away with it' was released on DVD in 2007 as a bonus feature for the complete series box set of Randall and Hopkirk (Deceased). The episode featured a guest role for R&H(D) star Mike Pratt. A solitary episode of The Fellows was released on DVD in 2007 as part of a set from Network DVD dedicated to the work of Robin Chapman and featuring Spindoe and his later gangster series Big Breadwinner Hog.

The first series of The Man in Room 17 was released on DVD in the United Kingdom on 17 June 2013. The second series was released on 3 March 2014. The Fellows (late of Room 17) was released on 1 July 2013.

== Recurring cast ==
The following appeared in the series.

=== The Man in Room 17 ===
- Edwin Oldenshaw - Richard Vernon
- Ian Dimmock - Michael Aldridge (Series 1)
- Imlac Defraits - Denholm Elliott (Series 2)
- Sir Geoffrey Norton - Willoughby Goddard
- Tracey Peverill - Amber Kammer (Series 2)
- Hatton - Michael Gover (Series 2)

=== The Fellows (Late of Room 17) ===
- Edwin Oldenshaw - Richard Vernon
- Ian Dimmock - Michael Aldridge
- Mrs Hollinczech - Jill Booty
- Thomas Anthem - James Ottaway
- Nashe - Michael Turner
- Det. Sgt Phillips - Clifford Cox
- Alec Spindoe - Ray McAnally
- Fletcher - Ray Lonnen
- Astley - Allan Cuthbertson
- Gerry - Edward Atienza
- Sherratt - Roy Marsden

== Episodes ==
=== The Man in Room 17 ===
Two series were broadcast.

==== Series 1 ====
- 11 June 1965 — Tell the Truth
- 18 June 1965 — Hello, Lazarus
- 25 June 1965 — The Years of Glory
- 2 July 1965 — Confidential Report
- 9 July 1965 — The Millions of Mazafariyah
- 16 July 1965 — The Seat of Power
- 23 July 1965 — Safe Conduct
- 30 July 1965 — A Minor Operation
- 6 August 1965 — Find the Lady
- 13 August 1965 — The Bequest
- 20 August 1965 — Up Against a Brick Wall
- 27 August 1965 — Out for a Duck
- 3 September 1965 — Black Anniversary

==== Series 2 ====
- 8 April 1966 — How to Rob a Bank - and Get Away with It
- 15 April 1966 — Vendetta
- 22 April 1966 — The Black Witch
- 29 April 1966 — First Steal Six Eggs
- 6 May 1966 — The Catacombs
- 13 May 1966 — Where There's Will
- 20 May 1966 — The Fissile Missile Makers
- 27 May 1966 — The Goddess of Love
- 3 June 1966 — Undue Influence
- 10 June 1966 — Lady Luck's No Gentleman
- 17 June 1966 — The Standard
- 24 June 1966 — Saints Are Safer Dead
- 1 July 1966 — Never Fall Down

=== The Fellows (Late of Room 17) ===
Thirteen episodes were broadcast in May–August 1967.

- 15 May 1967 — Episode 1
- 22 May 1967 — Episode 2
- 30 May 1967 — Episode 3
- 5 June 1967 — Episode 4
- 12 June 1967 — Episode 5
- 19 June 1967 — Episode 6
- 26 June 1967 — Episode 7
- 7 July 1967 — Episode 8
- 14 July 1967 — Episode 9
- 21 July 1967 — Episode 10
- 28 July 1967 — Episode 11
- 4 August 1967 — Episode 12
- 11 August 1967 — Episode 13
