= 5th Golden Satellite Awards =

Awards ceremony for film and television

- Date: January 14, 2001

Highlights
- Best drama film: Traffic
- Best comedy/musical film: Nurse Betty
- Best television drama: The West Wing
- Best television musical/comedy: Sex and the City
- Best director: Steven Soderbergh for Traffic

The 5th Golden Satellite Awards, given by the International Press Academy, were awarded on January 14, 2001.

== Special achievement awards ==
Career of Outstanding Service in the Entertainment Industry – Thom Mount

Mary Pickford Award (for outstanding contribution to the entertainment industry) – Francis Ford Coppola

Outstanding New Talent – Rob Brown

== Motion picture winners and nominees ==
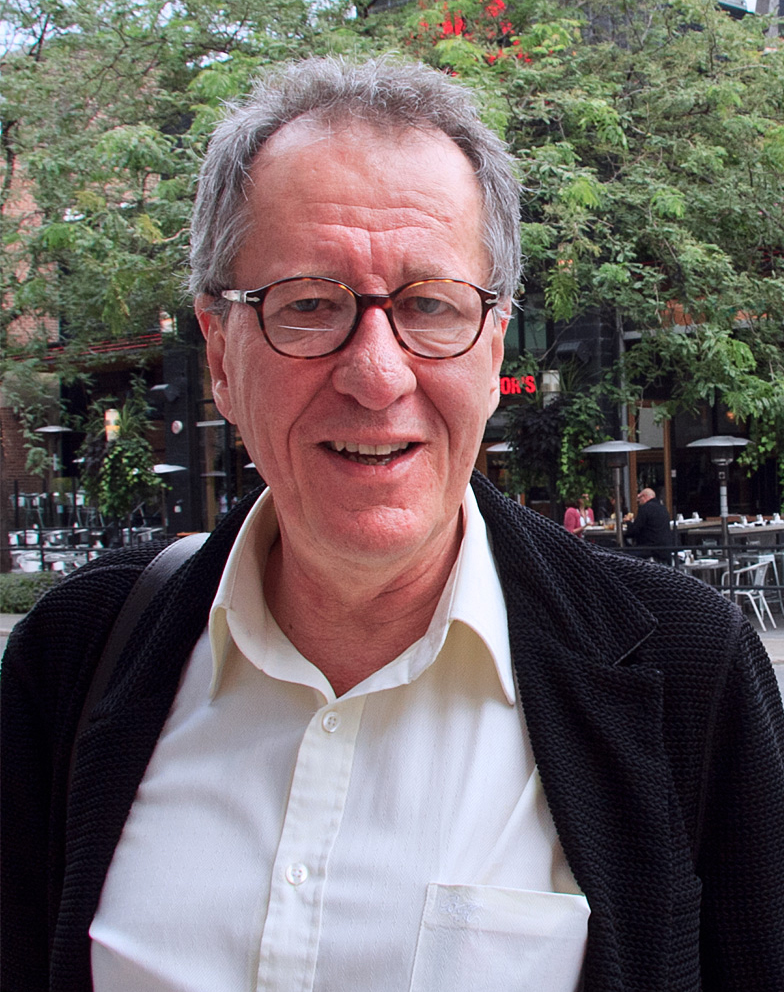
Geoffrey Rush – Best Actor in a Motion Picture, Drama

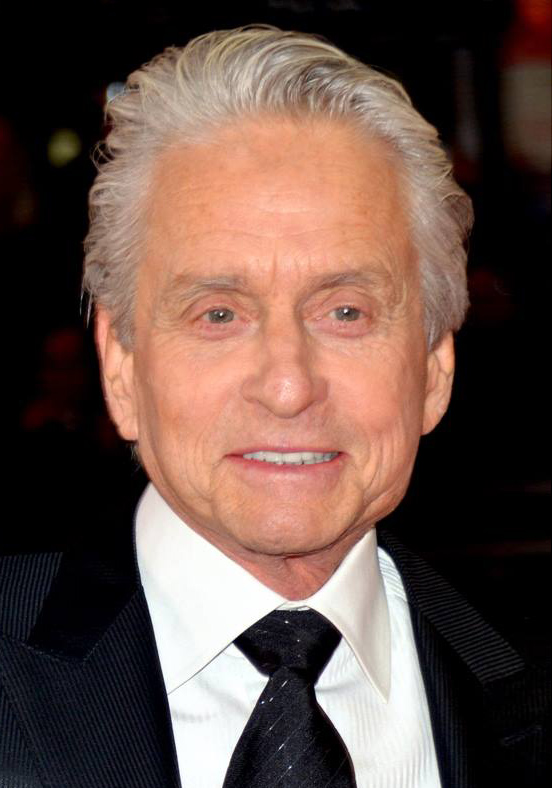
Michael Douglas – Best Actor in a Motion Picture, Comedy or Musical

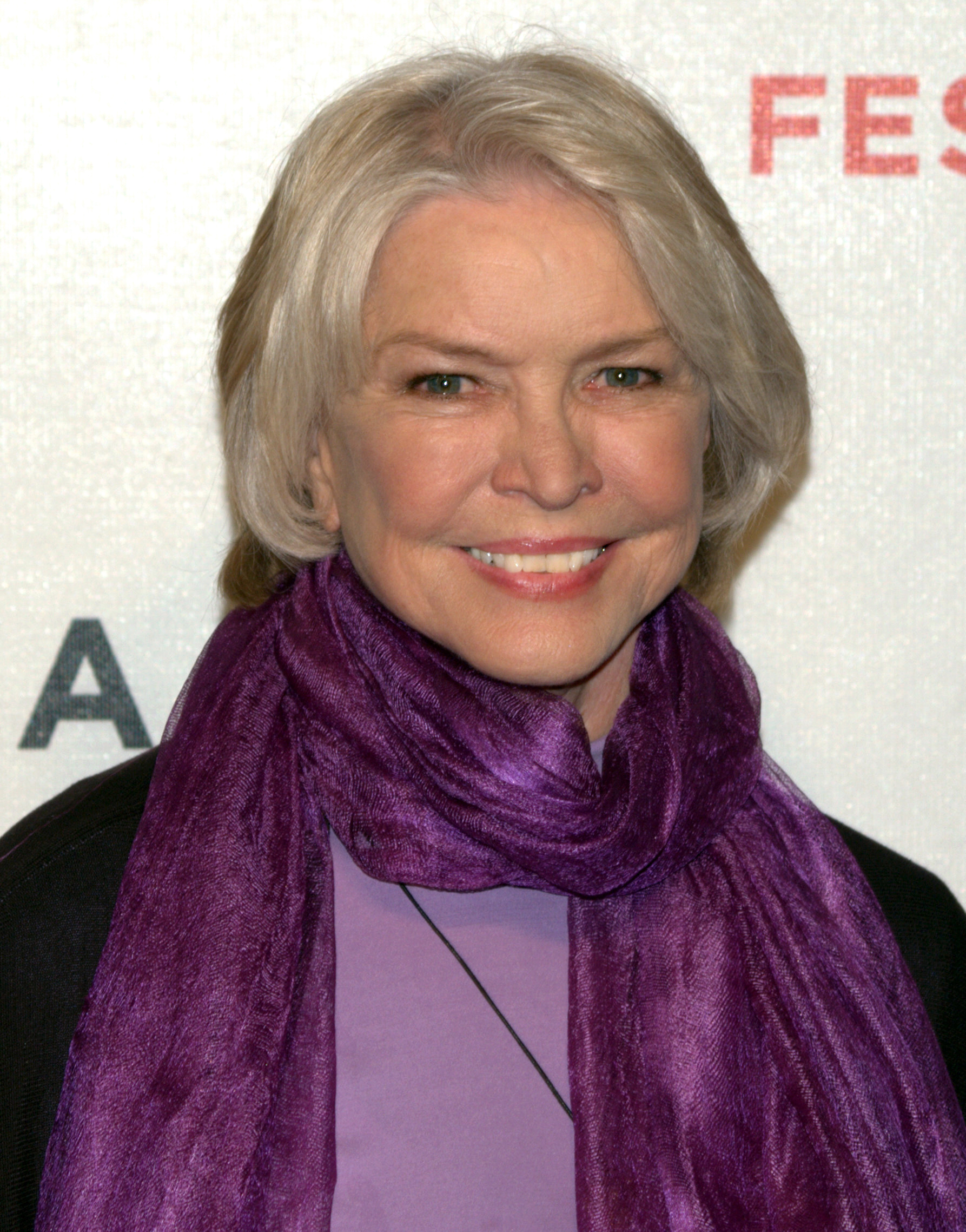
Ellen Burstyn – Best Actress in a Motion Picture, Drama

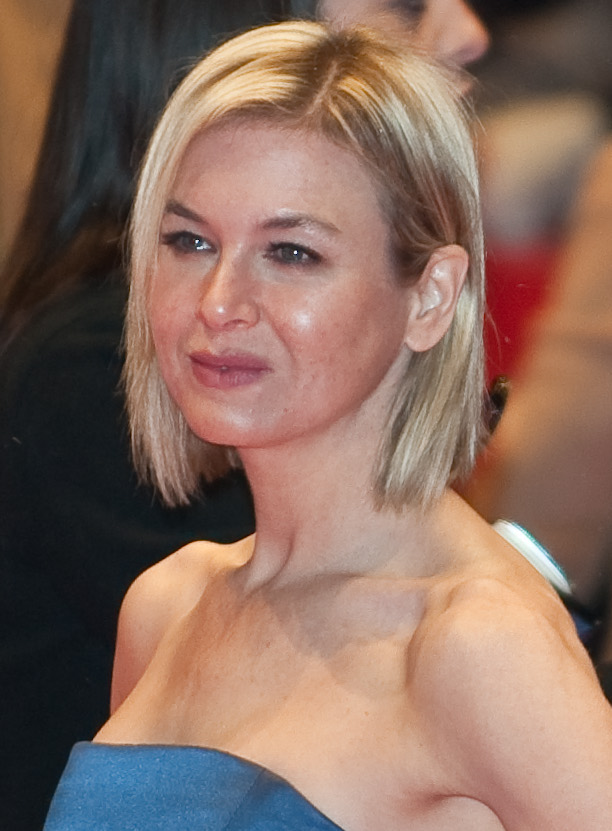
Renee Zellweger – Best Actress in a Motion Picture, Comedy or Musical

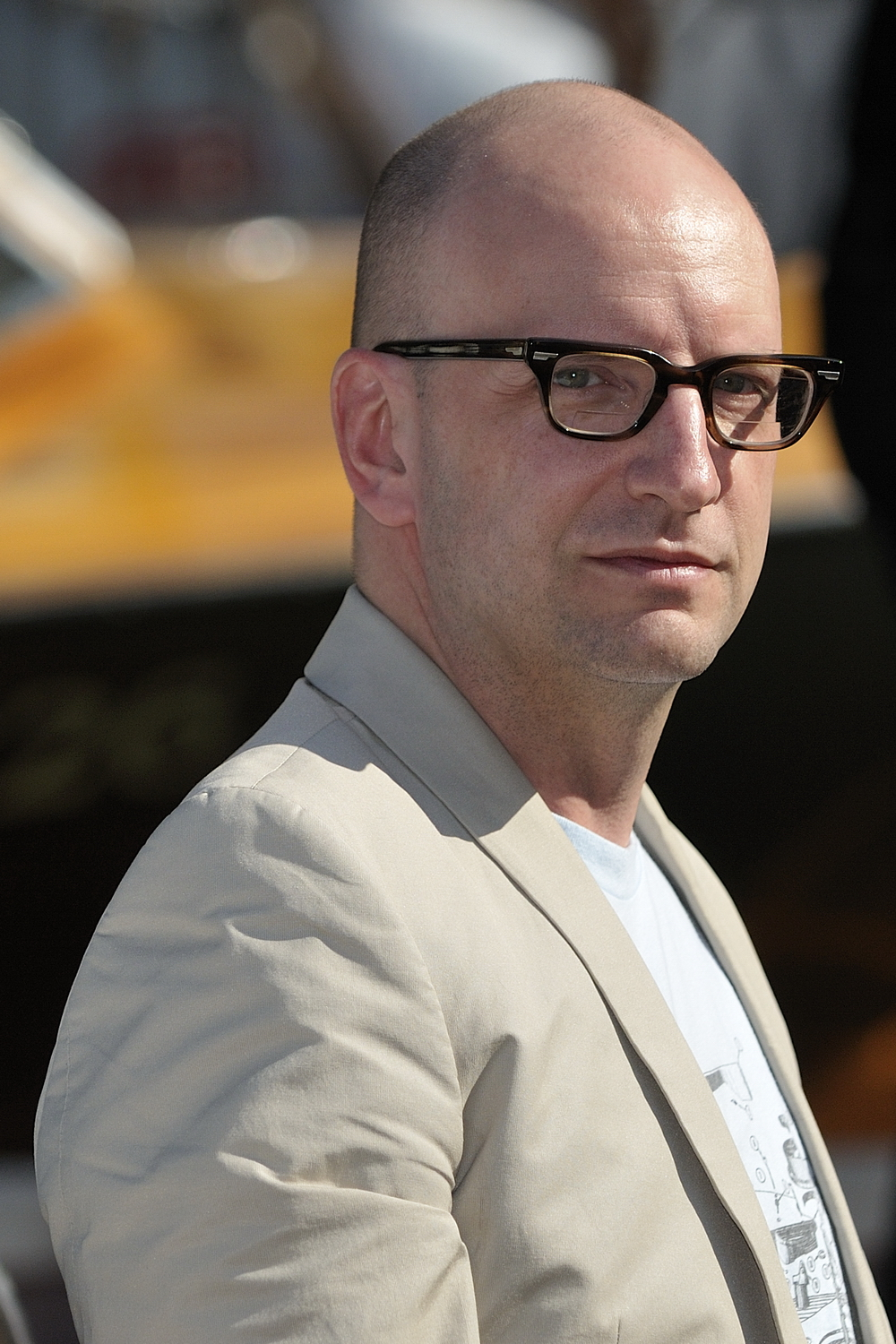
Steven Soderbergh – Best Director

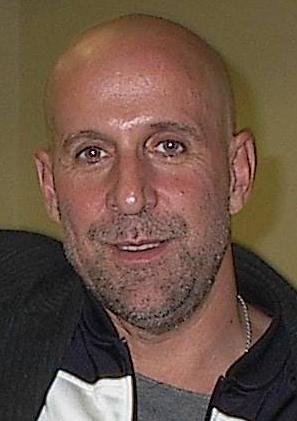
Peter Stormare – Best Original Song: "Dancer in the Dark"

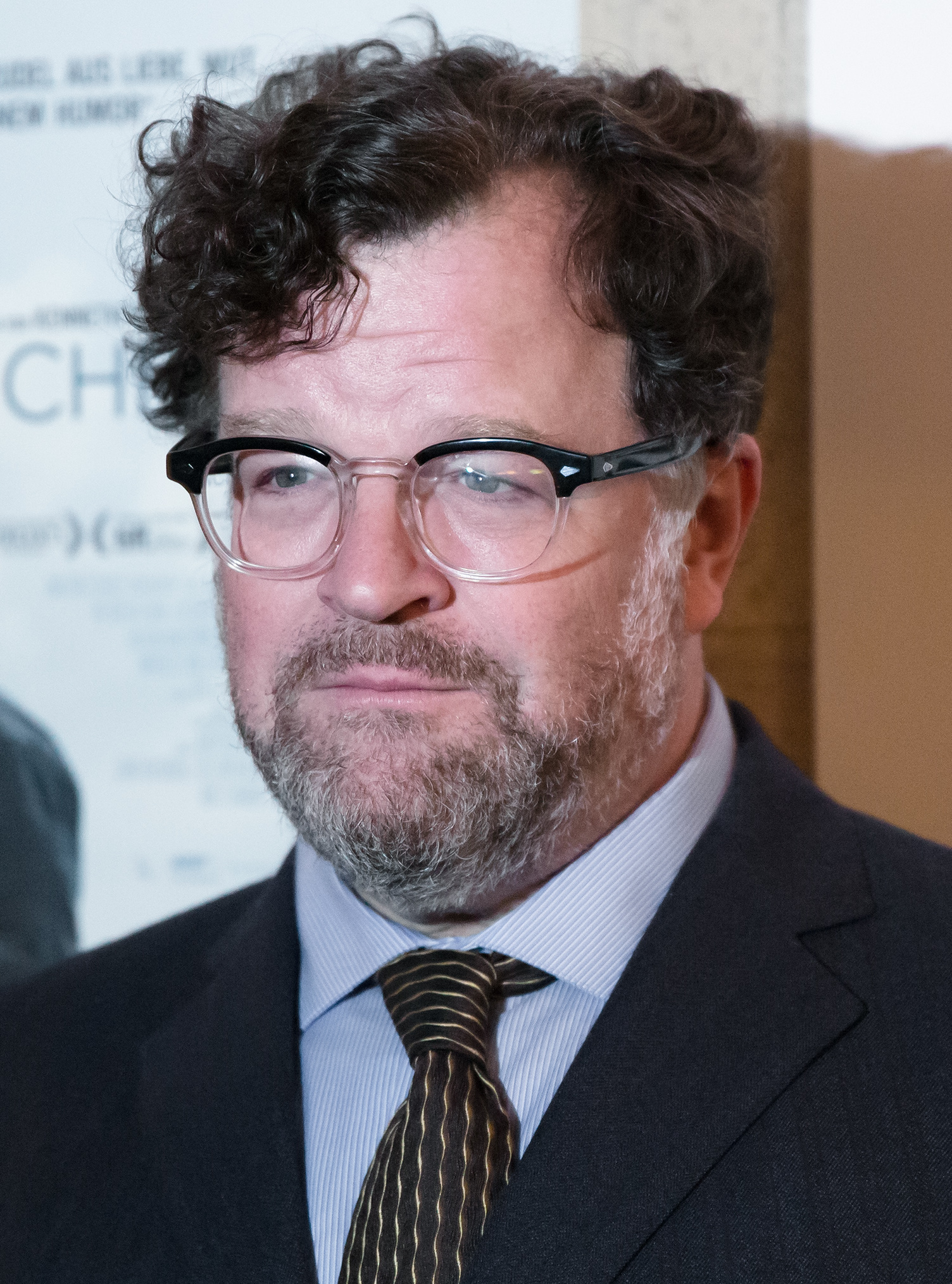
Kenneth Lonergan – Best Original Screenplay

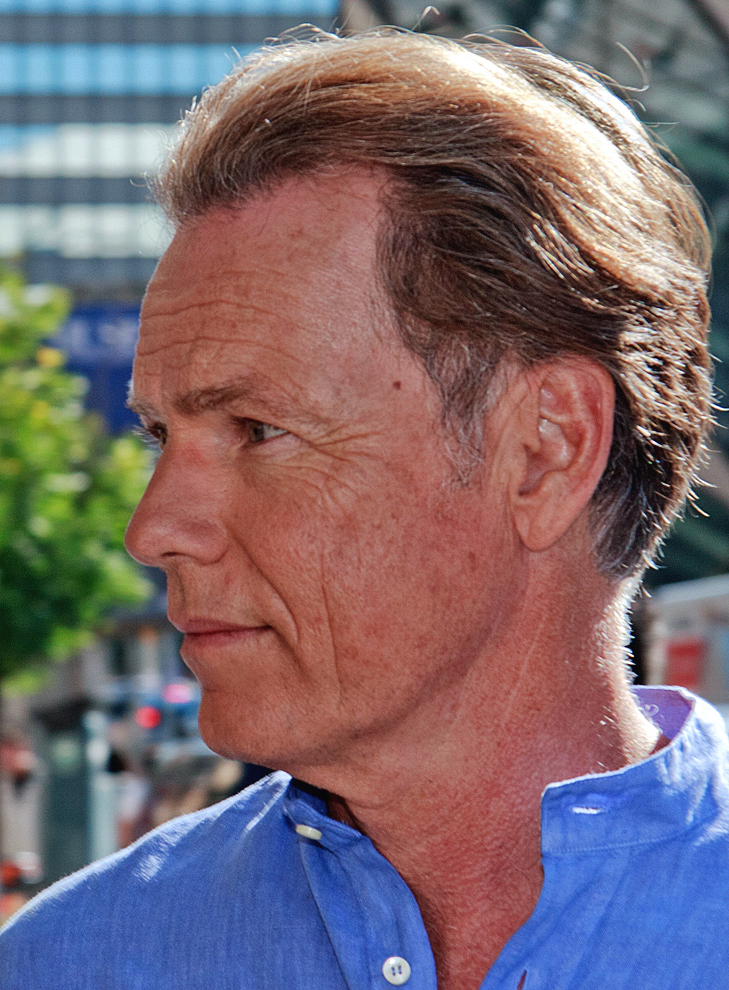
Bruce Greenwood – Best Supporting Actor in a Motion Picture, Drama

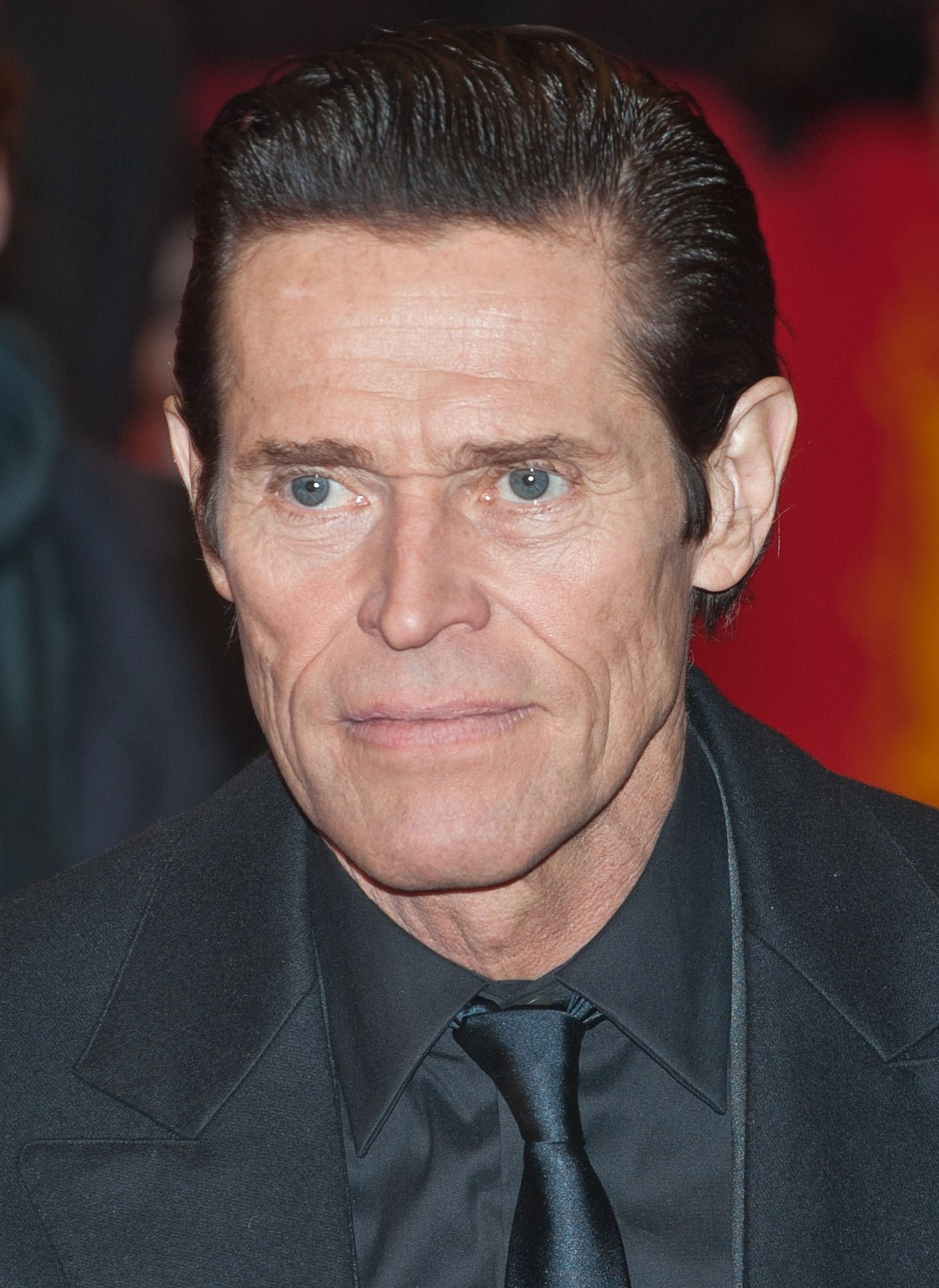
Willem Dafoe – Best Supporting Actor in a Motion Picture, Comedy or Musical

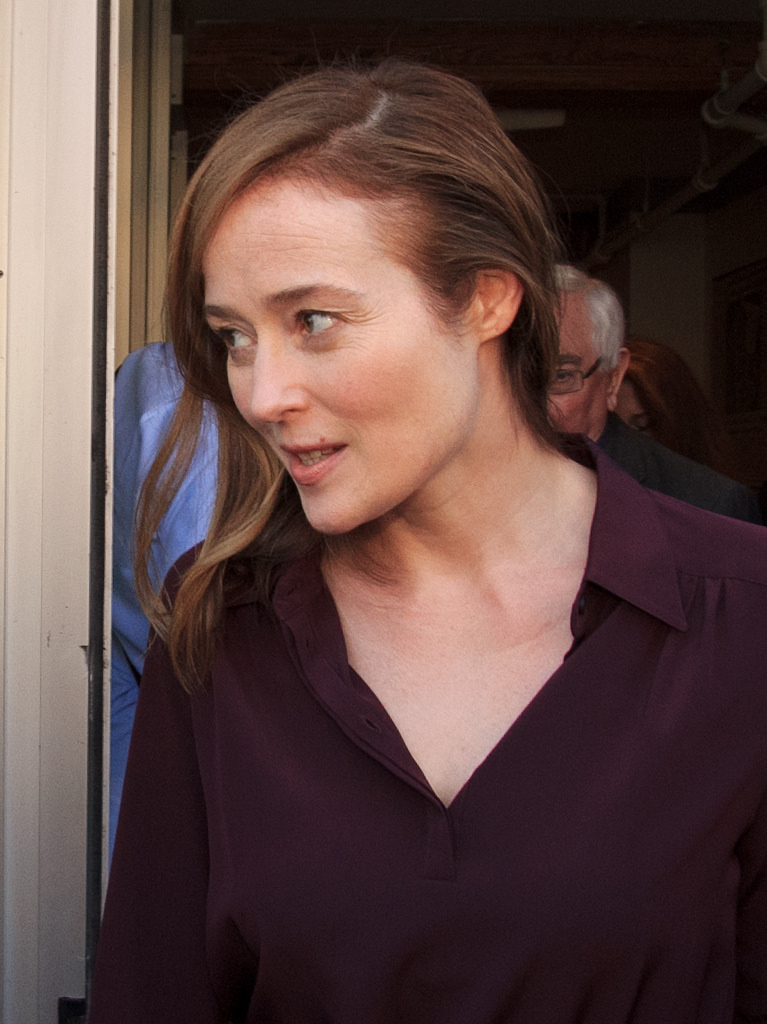
Jennifer Ehle – Best Supporting Actress in a Motion Picture, Drama

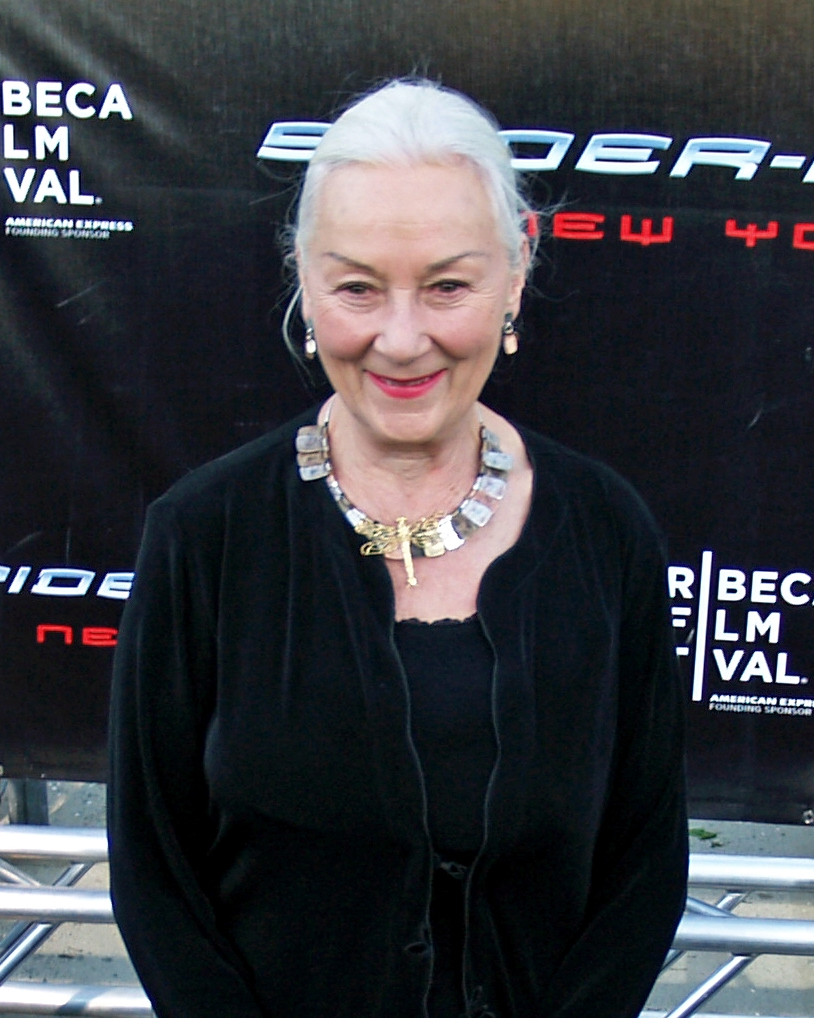
Rosemary Harris – Best Supporting Actress in a Motion Picture, Drama

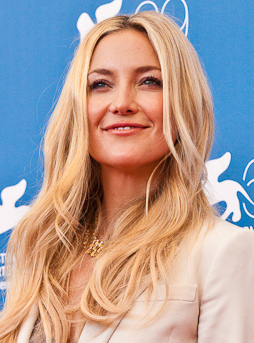
Kate Hudson – Best Supporting Actress in a Motion Picture, Comedy or Musical

=== Best Actor – Drama ===
Geoffrey Rush – Quills

- Jamie Bell – Billy Elliot
- Sean Connery – Finding Forrester
- Russell Crowe – Gladiator
- Ed Harris – Pollock
- Denzel Washington – Remember the Titans

=== Best Actor – Musical or Comedy ===
Michael Douglas – Wonder Boys

- George Clooney – O Brother, Where Art Thou?
- Richard Gere – Dr. T & the Women
- Christopher Guest – Best in Show
- Eddie Murphy – Nutty Professor II: The Klumps
- Edward Norton – Keeping the Faith

=== Best Actress – Drama ===
Ellen Burstyn – Requiem for a Dream

- Björk – Dancer in the Dark
- Joan Allen – The Contender
- Gillian Anderson – The House of Mirth
- Laura Linney – You Can Count on Me
- Julia Roberts – Erin Brockovich

=== Best Actress – Musical or Comedy ===
Renée Zellweger – Nurse Betty

- Brenda Blethyn – Saving Grace
- Sandra Bullock – Miss Congeniality
- Glenn Close – 102 Dalmatians
- Cameron Diaz – Charlie's Angels
- Jenna Elfman – Keeping the Faith

=== Best Animated or Mixed Media Film ===
Chicken Run

- Dinosaur
- The Emperor's New Groove
- Rugrats in Paris: The Movie
- Titan A.E.

=== Best Art Direction ===
The House of Mirth – Don Taylor

- Crouching Tiger, Hidden Dragon (Wo hu cang long)
- Gladiator
- How the Grinch Stole Christmas
- Traffic

=== Best Cinematography ===
Gladiator – John Mathieson

- Crouching Tiger, Hidden Dragon (Wo hu cang long)
- The Legend of Bagger Vance
- Mission: Impossible 2
- Traffic

=== Best Costume Design ===
How the Grinch Stole Christmas – Rita Ryack

- Crouching Tiger, Hidden Dragon (Wo hu cang long)
- Gladiator
- The House of Mirth
- The Patriot

=== Best Director ===
Steven Soderbergh – Traffic

- Cameron Crowe – Almost Famous
- Philip Kaufman – Quills
- Ang Lee – Crouching Tiger, Hidden Dragon (Wo hu cang long)
- Ridley Scott – Gladiator
- Steven Soderbergh – Erin Brockovich

=== Best Documentary Film ===
Reckless Indifference

- Captured on Film: The True Story of Marion Davies
- Dark Days
- The Eyes of Tammy Faye
- Into the Arms of Strangers: Stories of the Kindertransport
- One Day in September

=== Best Editing ===
Thirteen Days – Conrad Buff

- Crouching Tiger, Hidden Dragon (Wo hu cang long)
- Gladiator
- Mission: Impossible 2
- Traffic

=== Best Film – Drama ===
Traffic

- Billy Elliot
- Dancer in the Dark
- Erin Brockovich
- Gladiator
- Quills

=== Best Film – Musical or Comedy ===
Nurse Betty

- Almost Famous
- Best in Show
- O Brother, Where Art Thou?
- State and Main
- Wonder Boys

=== Best Foreign Language Film ===
Crouching Tiger, Hidden Dragon (Wo hu cang long), Taiwan

- Goya in Bordeaux (Goya en Burdeos), Spain
- His Wife's Diary (Dnevnik ego zheny), Russia
- Malèna, Italy
- Malli, India
- Shower (Xǐ zǎo), China

=== Best Original Score ===
"Gladiator" – Hans Zimmer and Lisa Girrard

- "The Legend of Bagger Vance" – Rachel Portman
- "Malèna" – Ennio Morricone
- "Proof of Life" – Danny Elfman
- "Traffic" – Cliff Martinez

=== Best Original Song ===
"I've Seen It All" performed by Björk and Peter Stormare – Dancer in the Dark

- "A Fool in Love" – Meet the Parents
- "My Funny Friend and Me" – The Emperor's New Groove
- "Things Have Changed" – Wonder Boys
- "Yours Forever" – The Perfect Storm

=== Best Screenplay – Adapted ===
Quills – Doug Wright

- The House of Mirth – Terence Davies
- O Brother, Where Art Thou? – Ethan and Joel Coen
- Thirteen Days – David Self
- Traffic – Stephen Gaghan

=== Best Screenplay – Original ===
You Can Count on Me – Kenneth Lonergan

- Almost Famous – Cameron Crowe
- Billy Elliot – Lee Hall
- Erin Brockovich – Susannah Grant
- State and Main – David Mamet

=== Best Sound ===
Dinosaur

- Chicken Run
- Crouching Tiger, Hidden Dragon (Wo hu cang long)
- Mission: Impossible 2
- The Perfect Storm

=== Best Supporting Actor – Drama ===
Bruce Greenwood – Thirteen Days

- Jeff Bridges – The Contender
- Benicio del Toro – Traffic
- Robert De Niro – Men of Honor
- Albert Finney – Erin Brockovich
- Joaquin Phoenix – Gladiator

=== Best Supporting Actor – Musical or Comedy ===
Willem Dafoe – Shadow of the Vampire

- Morgan Freeman – Nurse Betty
- Philip Seymour Hoffman – Almost Famous
- Tim Blake Nelson – O Brother, Where Art Thou?
- Brad Pitt – Snatch.
- Owen Wilson – Shanghai Noon

=== Best Supporting Actress – Drama ===
Jennifer Ehle – Sunshine (TIE)
Rosemary Harris – Sunshine (TIE)

- Judi Dench – Chocolat
- Catherine Deneuve – Dancer in the Dark
- Samantha Morton – Jesus' Son
- Julie Walters – Billy Elliot
- Kate Winslet – Quills

=== Best Supporting Actress – Musical or Comedy ===
Kate Hudson – Almost Famous

- Holly Hunter – O Brother, Where Art Thou?
- Frances McDormand – Almost Famous
- Catherine O'Hara – Best in Show
- Rebecca Pidgeon – State and Main
- Marisa Tomei – What Women Want

=== Best Visual Effects ===
Gladiator – John Nelson

- Charlie's Angels
- How the Grinch Stole Christmas
- Mission: Impossible 2
- Vertical Limit

=== Outstanding Motion Picture Ensemble ===
Traffic

== Television winners and nominees ==
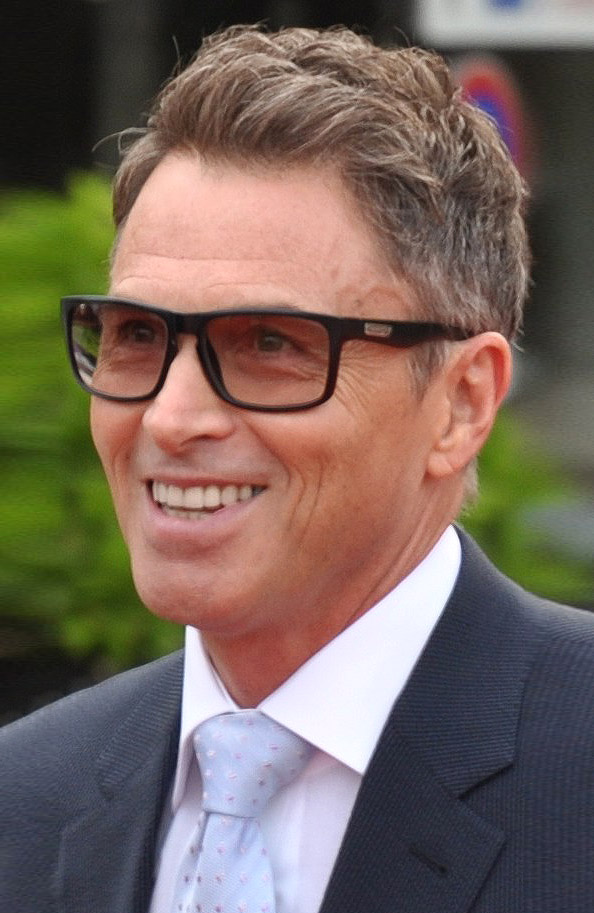
Tim Daly – Best Actor in a Series, Drama

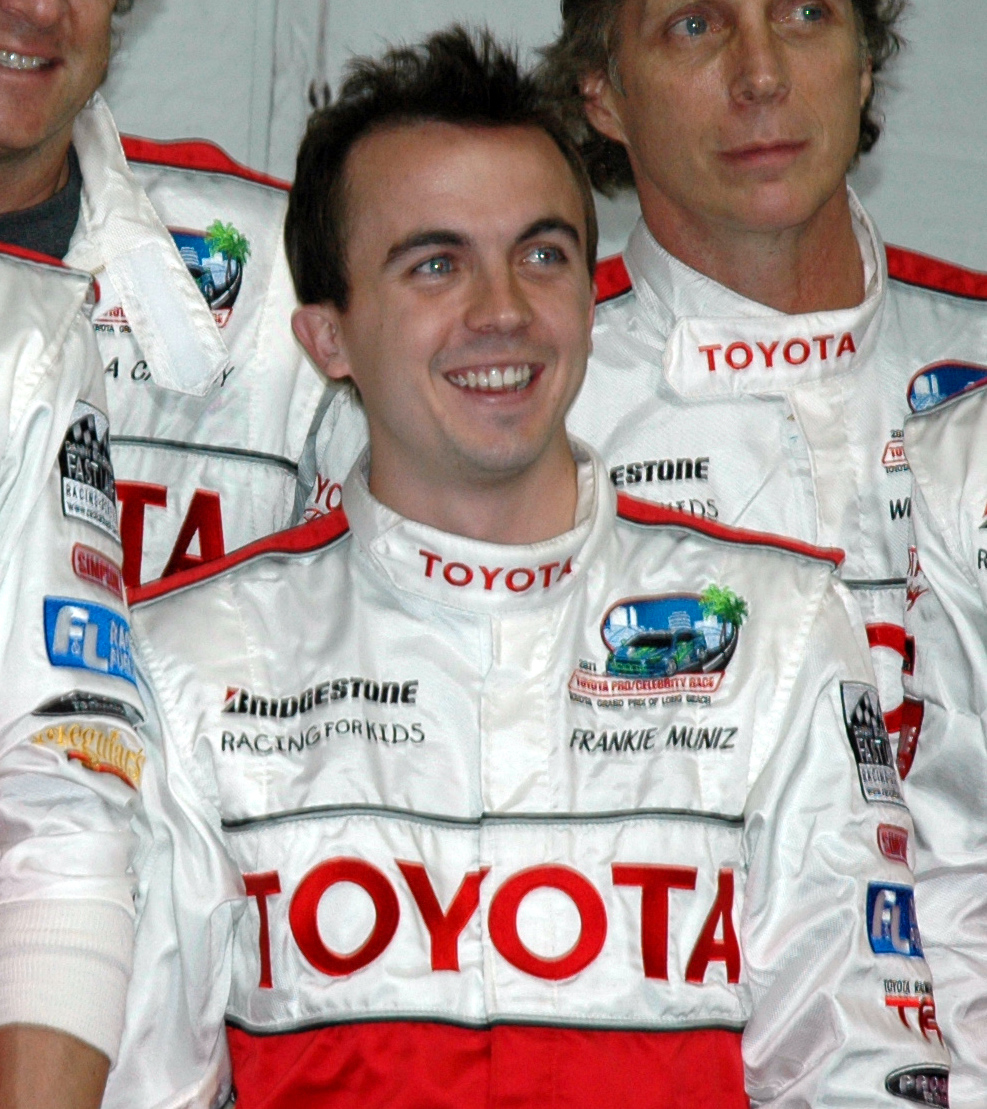
Frankie Muniz – Best Actor in a Series, Comedy or Musical

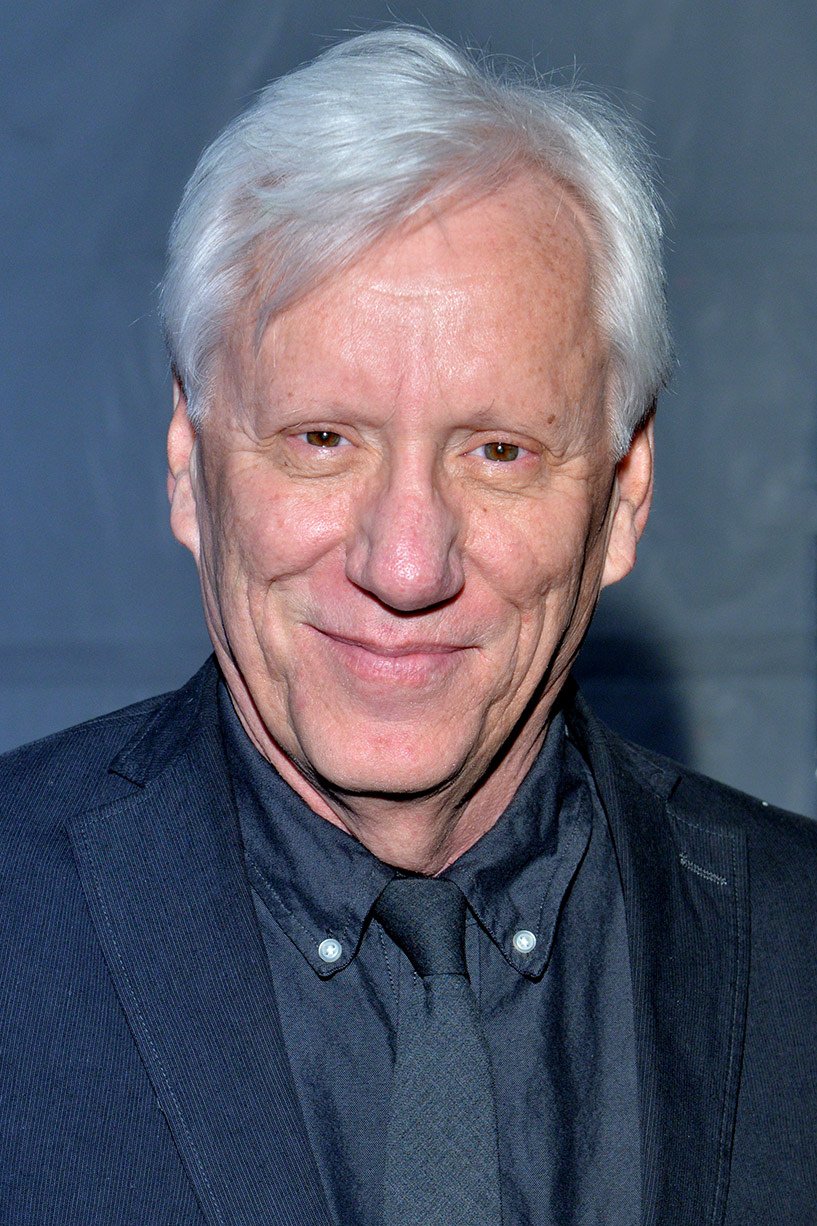
James Woods – Best Actor in a Miniseries or Television Film

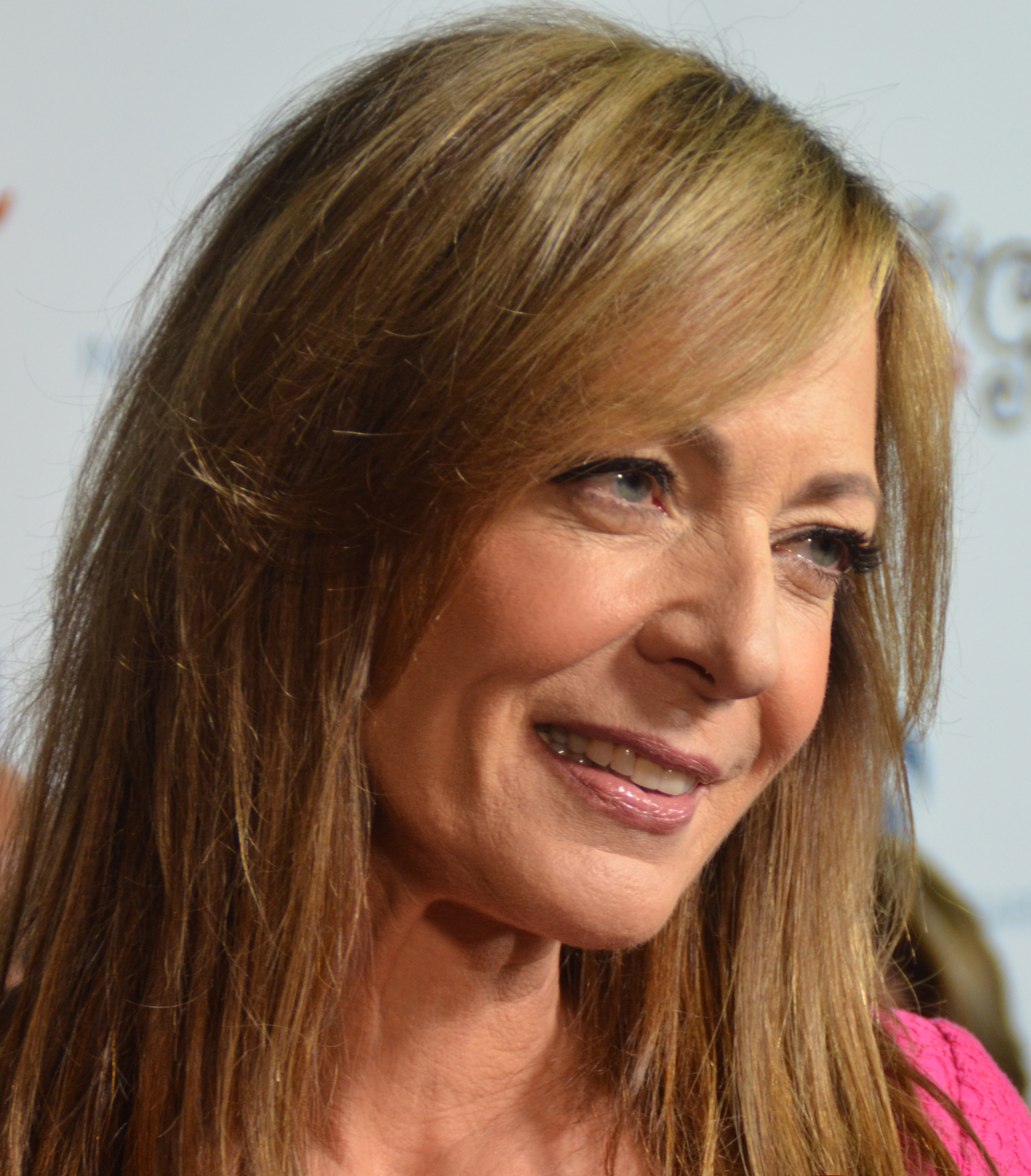
Allison Janney – Best Actress in a Series, Drama

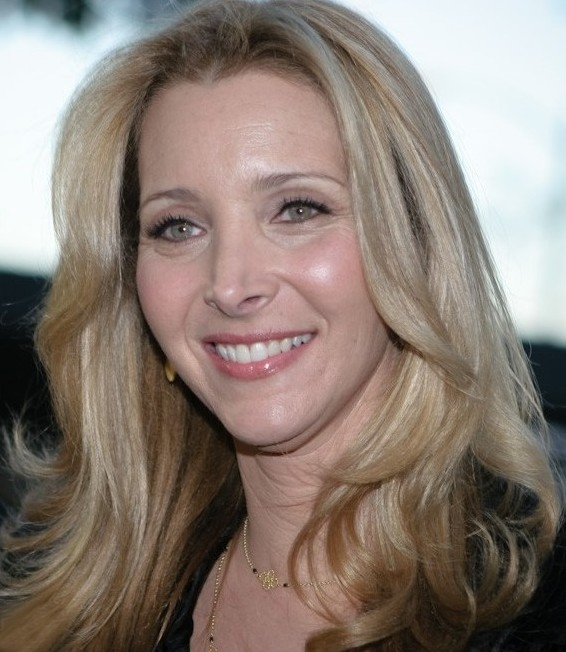
Lisa Kudrow – Best Actress in a Series, Comedy or Musical

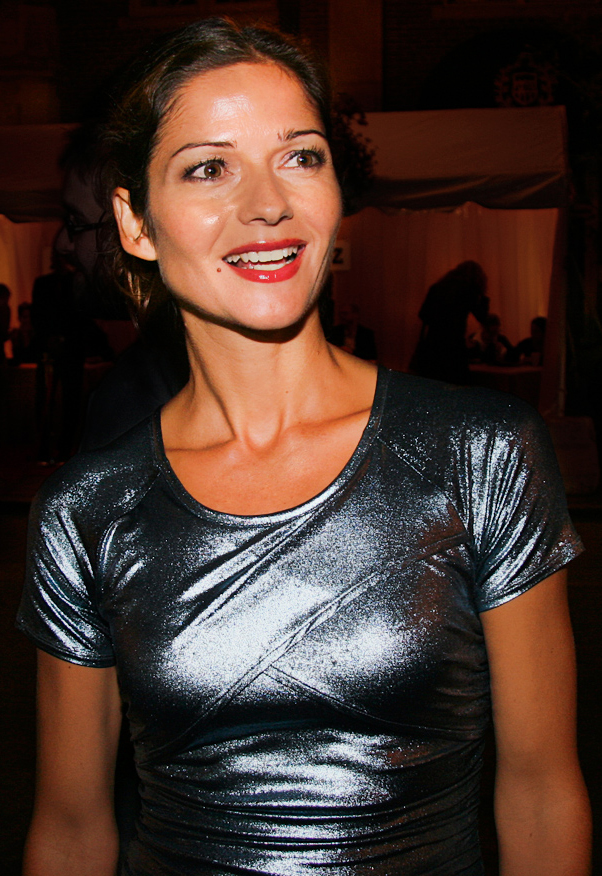
Jill Hennessy – Best Actress in a Miniseries or Television Film

=== Best Actor – Drama Series ===
Tim Daly – The Fugitive

- James Gandolfini – The Sopranos
- Dennis Haysbert – Now and Again
- Nicky Katt – Boston Public
- Martin Sheen – The West Wing

=== Best Actor – Musical or Comedy Series ===
Frankie Muniz – Malcolm in the Middle

- Robert Guillaume – Sports Night
- Sean Hayes – Will & Grace
- Stacy Keach – Titus
- John Mahoney – Frasier

=== Best Actor – Miniseries or TV Film ===
James Woods – Dirty Pictures

- Andy García – For Love or Country: The Arturo Sandoval Story
- Louis Gossett Jr. – The Color of Love: Jacey's Story
- Bob Hoskins – Noriega: God's Favorite
- Matthew Modine – Flowers for Algernon

=== Best Actress – Drama Series ===
Allison Janney – The West Wing

- Gillian Anderson – The X-Files
- Tyne Daly – Judging Amy
- Edie Falco – The Sopranos
- Sela Ward – Once and Again

=== Best Actress – Musical or Comedy Series ===
Lisa Kudrow – Friends

- Jenna Elfman – Dharma & Greg
- Jane Krakowski – Ally McBeal
- Wendie Malick – Just Shoot Me!
- Laura San Giacomo – Just Shoot Me!

=== Best Actress – Miniseries or TV Film ===
Jill Hennessy – Nuremberg

- Jennifer Beals – A House Divided
- Holly Hunter – Harlan County War
- Gena Rowlands – The Color of Love: Jacey's Story
- Vanessa Redgrave – If These Walls Could Talk 2

=== Best Miniseries ===
American Tragedy

- The Corner
- The Beach Boys: An American Family
- Jason and the Argonauts
- Sally Hemings: An American Scandal

=== Best Series – Drama ===
The West Wing

- The Fugitive
- Once and Again
- The Practice
- The Sopranos

=== Best Series – Musical or Comedy ===
Sex and the City

- Frasier
- Friends
- Just Shoot Me!
- The Simpsons

=== Best TV Film ===
Harlan County War

- Cheaters
- Dirty Pictures
- For Love or Country: The Arturo Sandoval Story
- Nuremberg

=== Outstanding Television Ensemble ===
The West Wing

== New Media winners and nominees ==
=== Best Internet Site ===
Inside.com

- AtomFilms.com (Atom Films)
- Beatnik.com (Beatnik)
- Launch.com (Launch Media)
- RealGuide.com (Real Networks)

=== Computer Educational ===
Family Tree Maker 8.0 Deluxe

- Acid DJ 2.0
- Barbie Magic Genie Bottle
- Nancy Drew: Message in a Haunted Mansion

=== Computer Software ===
Adobe Photoshop 6.0

- Giants: Citizen Kabuto
- Mechanical Warrior IV
- The Sims
- Tomb Raider: Chronicles

=== Video Game ===
Perfect Dark

- 007: The World Is Not Enough
- FIFA 2001 Major League Soccer
- Final Fantasy IX
- Quake II

== Awards breakdown ==
=== Film ===
Winners:

3 / 9 Traffic: Best Director / Best Film – Drama / Outstanding Motion Picture Ensemble
3 / 10 Gladiator: Best Cinematography / Best Original Score / Best Visual Effects
2 / 2 Sunshine: Best Supporting Actress – Drama (2x)
2 / 3 Nurse Betty: Best Actress – Musical or Comedy / Best Film – Musical or Comedy
2 / 3 Thirteen Days: Best Editing / Best Supporting Actor – Drama
2 / 5 Quills: Best Actor – Drama / Best Screenplay – Adapted
1 / 1 Reckless Indifference: Best Documentary Film
1 / 1 Requiem for a Dream: Best Actress – Drama
1 / 1 Shadow of the Vampire: Best Supporting Actor – Musical or Comedy
1 / 2 Chicken Run: Best Animated or Mixed Media Film
1 / 2 Dinosaur: Best Sound
1 / 2 You Can Count on Me: Best Screenplay – Original
1 / 3 How the Grinch Stole Christmas: Best Costume Design
1 / 3 Wonder Boys: Best Actor – Musical or Comedy
1 / 4 Dancer in the Dark: Best Original Song
1 / 4 The House of Mirth: Best Art Direction
1 / 6 Almost Famous: Best Supporting Actress – Musical or Comedy
1 / 7 Crouching Tiger, Hidden Dragon (Wo hu cang long): Best Foreign Language Film

Losers:

0 / 5 Erin Brockovich, O Brother, Where Art Thou?
0 / 4 Billy Elliot, Mission: Impossible 2
0 / 3 Best in Show, State and Main
0 / 2 Charlie's Angels, The Contender, The Emperor's New Groove, Keeping the Faith, The Legend of Bagger Vance, Malèna, The Perfect Storm

=== Television ===
Winners:

3 / 4 The West Wing: Best Actress – Drama Series / Best Series – Drama / Outstanding Television Ensemble
1 / 1 American Tragedy: Best Miniseries
1 / 1 Malcolm in the Middle: Best Actor – Musical or Comedy Series
1 / 1 Sex and the City: Best Series – Musical or Comedy
1 / 2 Dirty Pictures: Best Actor – Miniseries or TV Film
1 / 2 Friends: Best Actress – Musical or Comedy Series
1 / 2 The Fugitive: Best Actor – Drama Series
1 / 2 Harlan County War: Best TV Film
1 / 2 Nuremberg: Best Actress – Miniseries or TV Film

Losers:

0 / 3 Just Shoot Me!, The Sopranos
0 / 2 The Color of Love: Jacey's Story, For Love or Country: The Arturo Sandoval Story, Frasier, Once and Again
