= Donald Burton =

British actor (1934–2007)

- Donald Burton and Nicola Pagett in Upstairs, Downstairs (1971)
- Born: Donald Graham Burton; 10 February 1934; Norwich, Norfolk, England
- Died: 8 December 2007 (aged 73); Cathedral City, California, U.S.
- Spouse: Carroll Baker (m. 1982)

Donald Graham Burton (10 February 1934 – 8 December 2007) was an English theatre and television actor.

== Life and career ==
Donald was born in Norwich, England, on 10 February 1934. He attended the Royal Academy of Dramatic Art on a scholarship. He worked as an Associate Artist of the Royal Shakespeare Company for many years. He appeared in such famous Shakespeare plays as The Wars of the Roses and Henry IV, Part 1 and 2. He played the character of the Duke of Exeter in the whole series of the 8 Shakespeare 'History' plays which were performed at the R.S.C. in 1964. In 1965 he appeared in the outstandingly successful RSC production of Gogol's The Government Inspector at the Aldwych Theatre, London, with Paul Scofield, Eric Porter, Paul Rogers, Stanley Lebor, Bruce Condell and other outstanding Shakespearian actors of the period

Burton's television roles included Big Breadwinner Hog, Warship, The Duchess of Duke Street; The Doombolt Chase; Upstairs, Downstairs, Public Eye, Minder (Gunfight at the O.K. Laundrette) and Fraud Squad. His more contemporary theatre roles included How the Other Half Loves and Educating Rita. He would have been best known amongst the British public for his role as Commander Mark Nialls, captain of the fictional HMS Hero in the BBC television drama Warship.

In 1990, Burton returned to Broadway in the production of The Merchant of Venice at the 46th Street Theatre.

Burton married actress Carroll Baker on 10 March 1978. The couple were married for 29 years until his death in December 2007. Donald Burton has three daughters Rachel Larkin, Sarah Burton and Kerri Davenport Burton.

Donald Burton died of emphysema at his home in Cathedral City, California, on 8 December 2007. He was 73 years old.

== Personal life ==
Burton was the third and last husband of actress Carroll Baker. They married on 10 March 1982, and remained married until his death. They met while on tour with the play Motive.

== Filmography ==
- King Arthur, the Young Warlord (1975) - Herwood the Holy
- The Message (1976) - Amr
- Spogliando Valeria (1989) - Senator Verani
- Alcune signore per bene (1990) - Paul
- Hudson Hawk (1991) - Alfred
- Goldilocks and the Three Bears (1995) - Mr McReady
- Follow Your Heart (1999) - Malcolm

== Television ==
- Upstairs Downstairs
- Warship
- The Duchess of Duke Street
- Crown Court
- 1990 (1978) - Harry Blaney
- 1973 Public Eye
