= Janet Dulin Jones =

American screenwriter, playwright and producer

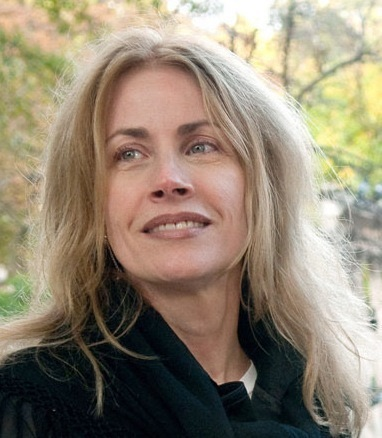

Janet Dulin Jones is an American screenwriter, playwright and producer.

== Biography ==
A graduate of Long Beach State University, Jones has written screenplays for various film studios in Hollywood, including Paramount Studios, Sony Pictures, Disney and Twentieth Century Fox. Screenplays include Map of the World, starring Sigourney Weaver and Julianne Moore; The Ambassadors, an adaptation of the Henry James novel; and Custom of the Country, adapted from the novel by Edith Wharton.

Currently, Jones is working with directors; Mike Newell and Scott Winant on a TV series Gramercy Park which will shoot in the UK, in association with AMC, E-One UK and Executive Producer Brenda Friend for a 2020 production. Millie Brady, who was cast in the main role, said "Janet Dulin Jones has created this world which is so rich and steeped with history and darkness, and she has just seamlessly merged the historical with the fictional; and she has made this dangerous and sexy and completely unique piece of writing."

Jones adapted What If God Were the Sun?, a novel by television psychic medium John Edward, for Lifetime Television. The film starred Gena Rowlands, who was nominated for the Emmy Award for Outstanding Lead Actress in a Miniseries or Movie and the Screen Actors Guild Award for Outstanding Performance by a Female Actor in a Miniseries or Television Movie for her performance.

Jones has also written, Kicks, an original screenplay for Diane Keaton to direct. Her original screenplay, The Last Romantics, is being produced in London with Goldenring Productions and CCPartnership with Swedish director, Lisa Ohlin helming the film.

Jones's play, A Tale of Charles Dickens, is an adaptation by herself and director Paul Lazarus from her original screenplay, "Dickens and Crime". A special radio version of the work was created for National Public Radio's The Play's The Thing in March 2006. The play is under submission in London, England. Her newest play, "The Elizabeths" is being produced by David Parfitt and Bob Benton of Bob & Co. in London.

Jones was a Nicholls Award finalist for screenwriting from the Academy of Motion Picture Arts and Sciences. She is a member of the Writers Guild of America, serves on the board of the Young Filmmaker's Academy, and is writer-in-residence for the Antaeus Theatre Company in Los Angeles. She was a fellow at the prestigious Autumn Stories Program in France in 2009.
