= Mike Newell (director) =

British film director and producer (born 1942)

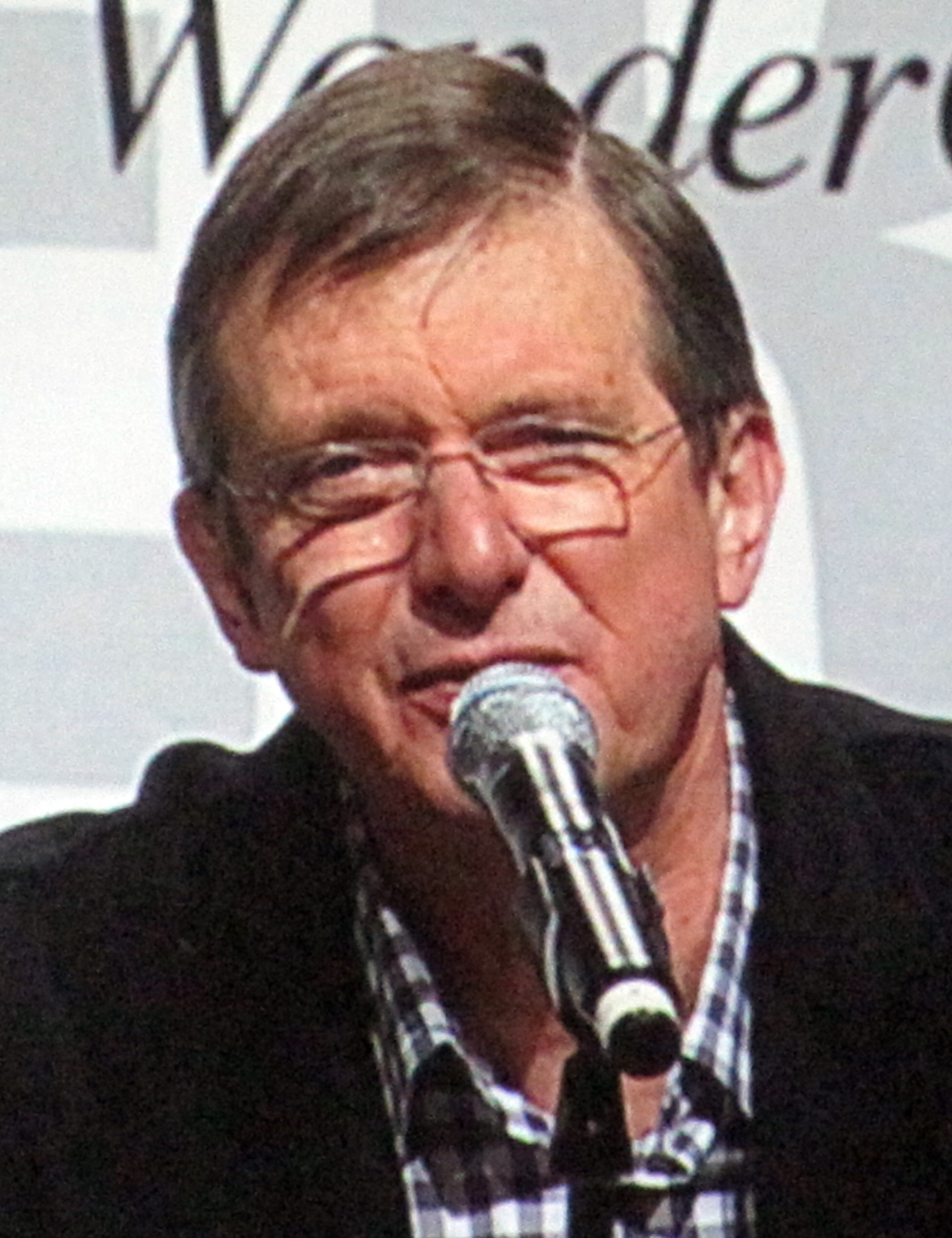
- Newell at WonderCon 2010
- Born: Michael Cormac Newell; 28 March 1942 (age 84); St Albans, Hertfordshire, England
- Education: Magdalene College, Cambridge
- Occupations: Director, producer
- Years active: 1963–present
- Notable work: Four Weddings and a Funeral; Donnie Brasco; Pushing Tin; Mona Lisa Smile; Harry Potter and the Goblet of Fire; Prince of Persia: The Sands of Time; Great Expectations
- Spouse: Bernice Stegers (m. 1980)
- Children: 2
- Awards: BAFTA Award for Best Direction; Four Weddings and a Funeral (1994)

Michael Cormac Newell (born 28 March 1942) is an English director and producer of film and television. He won BAFTA Awards for Best Direction and Best Film for Four Weddings and a Funeral (1994). His other films include Dance with a Stranger (1985), Enchanted April (1991), Donnie Brasco (1997), Mona Lisa Smile (2003), Harry Potter and the Goblet of Fire (2005), Prince of Persia: The Sands of Time (2010), and Great Expectations (2012).

== Early life ==
Newell was born in St Albans, Hertfordshire, as the son of amateur actors, and was educated at St Albans School. He read English at Magdalene College, Cambridge. He then attended a three-year training course at Granada Television with the intention of entering the theatre.

== Career ==
Newell directed various British TV shows from the 1960s onwards (such as Spindoe, credited as Cormac Newell, and Big Breadwinner Hog), but eventually shifted his focus to film direction.

His first feature-length project was The Man in the Iron Mask (1977), a made-for-television film. His first critically acclaimed movie was Bad Blood (1981), concerning the 1941 manhunt for the New Zealand mass-killer Stan Graham played by Jack Thompson. This was followed by Dance with a Stranger (1985), a biographical drama starring Miranda Richardson as Ruth Ellis, the last woman to be hanged in the UK. For his directorial efforts, Newell won the Award of the Youth at the 1985 Cannes Film Festival.

Newell continued his successes in the film industry with Enchanted April (1991), an adaptation of the 1922 novel by Elizabeth von Arnim. Miranda Richardson won the Golden Globe Award for Best Actress – Motion Picture Comedy or Musical and Joan Plowright won the Golden Globe Award for Best Supporting Actress – Motion Picture.

During this period, George Lucas recruited Newell as one of the numerous feature film directors to direct episodes of The Young Indiana Jones Chronicles.

The comedy Four Weddings and a Funeral (1994) was also critically acclaimed, winning numerous awards, including a César Award (Best Foreign Film), a Golden Globe (Best Actor – Hugh Grant), and a number of London Critics Circle Film Awards (Best Director, Film, Producer, and Screenwriter).

Since these award-winning productions, Newell has directed a number of films in Hollywood, such as Donnie Brasco (1997) (starring Al Pacino and Johnny Depp), Pushing Tin (1999) (starring John Cusack, Billy Bob Thornton, Cate Blanchett, and Angelina Jolie) and Mona Lisa Smile (2003) (starring Julia Roberts, Kirsten Dunst, and Julia Stiles).

In 2005, Newell was presented with an honorary degree of Doctor of Arts by the University of Hertfordshire which has a campus in St Albans, his birthplace. He was also awarded the BAFTA Britannia Award for Artistic Excellence in Directing for his career prior to 2005. Newell became the first British director of the Harry Potter film series with the production of Harry Potter and the Goblet of Fire, the fourth adaptation in the series, which became a major critical and financial success worldwide. Newell is heard briefly as the radio announcer at the beginning of the film.

Newell directed Love in the Time of Cholera in 2007 and Prince of Persia: The Sands of Time in 2010. In February 2011, Newell attended the British Academy Film Awards along with Harry Potter author J.K. Rowling, David Heyman, David Barron, David Yates, Alfonso Cuarón, Rupert Grint, and Emma Watson to collect the Michael Balcon Award for Outstanding Contribution to British Cinema on behalf of the Harry Potter film series.

Continuing to work on adaptations, Newell directed Great Expectations (2012) from the novel by Charles Dickens with Ralph Fiennes, Helena Bonham Carter, and Jeremy Irvine in starring roles. The film had its world premiere at the Toronto International Film Festival.

On Christmas Day in 2016, Newell appeared as a contestant on a special episode of the BBC's University Challenge, representing his alma mater, Magdalene College, Cambridge.

== Filmography ==
=== Film ===
Year	Title	Functioned as		Notes
Year	Title	Director	Exec. Producer	Notes
1980	The Awakening	Yes	No	
1981	Bad Blood	Yes	No	
1985	Dance with a Stranger	Yes	No	
1985	The Good Father	Yes	No	
1987	Amazing Grace and Chuck	Yes	No	
1988	Soursweet	Yes	No	
1991	Enchanted April	Yes	No	
1992	Into the West	Yes	No	
1994	Four Weddings and a Funeral	Yes	No	
1995	An Awfully Big Adventure	Yes	No	
1997	Donnie Brasco	Yes	No	
1999	Pushing Tin	Yes	No	
2003	Mona Lisa Smile	Yes	No	
2005	Harry Potter and the Goblet of Fire	Yes	No	
2007	Love in the Time of Cholera	Yes	No	
2010	Prince of Persia: The Sands of Time	Yes	No	
2012	Great Expectations	Yes	Yes	
2018	The Guernsey Literary and Potato Peel Pie Society	Yes	No	
TBA	My Duchess	Yes	No	In production

==== Executive producer only ====
Year	Title	Director	Notes
1997	Photographing Fairies	Nick Willing	
1999	200 Cigarettes	Risa Bramon Garcia	
1999	Best Laid Plans	Mike Barker	
2000	High Fidelity	Stephen Frears	
2000	Traffic	Steven Soderbergh	
2003	I Capture the Castle	Tim Fywell	
2014	Enchanted Kingdom 3D	Patrick Morris; Neil Nightingale	Documentary

=== Television ===
TV series

Year(s)	Title	Notes
1966	Coronation Street	8 episodes
1967	The Fellows	5 episodes
1967	Escape	1 episode
1967–81	ITV Playhouse	4 episodes
1968	Spindoe	4 episodes
1968	City '68	2 episodes
1968	Her Majesty's Pleasure	5 episodes
1969	Big Breadwinner Hog	6 episodes
1969	Parkin's Patch	2 episodes
1969–70	ITV Saturday Night Theatre	2 episodes
1970	Confession	2 episodes
1970	Diamond Crack Diamond	1 episode
1970	The Adventures of Don Quick	1 episode
1971	The Guardians	2 episodes
1971–72	Thirty-Minute Theatre	2 episodes
1971–72	Budgie	6 episodes
1972	The Man from Haven	
1972–78	Play for Today	6 episodes
1973	Love Story	2 episodes
1973	Hadleigh	2 episodes
1973	Late Night Theatre	3 episodes
1973	Wessex Tales	1 episode
1974	Childhood	1 episode
1974	Late Night Drama	2 episodes
1975	BBC2 Playhouse	1 episode
1975	Comedy Premiere	1 episode
1976	Red Letter Day	1 episode
1976	Second City Firsts	1 episode
1977	The Sunday Drama	1 episode
1978	BBC2 Play of the Week	1 episode
1989	Smith and Jones in Small Doses	1 episode
1993	The Young Indiana Jones Chronicles	2 episodes
2019	One Red Nose Day and a Wedding	TV Short

Executive producer only

Year(s)	Name	Notes
2003	The Branch	
2004–06	Huff	16 episodes

TV movies

- Sharon (1964) (Documentary)
- Comedy Workshop: Love and Maud Carver (1964)
- The Kindness of Strangers (1967)
- Them Down There (1968)
- The Visitors (1968)
- The Gamekeeper (1968)
- 69 Murder – The Blood Relation (1968)
- Blood Relations (1969)
- Arthur Wants You for a Sunbeam (1970)
- Mrs. Mouse, Are You Within? (1971)
- Big Soft Nelly Mrs. Mouse (1971)
- Baa Baa Black Sheep (1974)
- The Gift of Friendship (1974)
- The Boundary (1975)
- The Midas Connection (1975)
- Lost Yer Tongue? (1975)
- Of the Fields, Lately (1976)
- The Man in the Iron Mask (1977)
- The Fosdyke Saga (1977)
- Little Girls Don't (1978)
- Blood Feud (1983)
- Birth of a Nation (1983)
- The Whole Hog (1989)
- Common Ground (1990)
- Jo (2002) (Also producer)
- The Interestings (2016)

== Unrealized projects ==
Year	Title and description	Ref(s)
1990s	Old Friends, a film written by Mark Andrus about a curmudgeon who forms a family with a waitress and a gay artist	
1990s	Phenomenon	
1990s	High Fidelity	
1990s	A film adaptation of A. S. Byatt's novel Possession written by Don Macpherson	
1990s	A film adaptation of Peter Guralnick's novel Last Train to Memphis starring Leonardo DiCaprio as Elvis Presley	
1990s	Best Laid Plans	
1990s	An untitled black comedy written by Bob Comfort	
1990s	A remake of the 1960 film The Grass Is Greener	
1990s	Shanghai	
2000s	How to Lose a Guy in 10 Days starring Gwyneth Paltrow	
2000s	The Poetess, a film written by Will Davies about a romance between a female poet and a Cambridge don	
2000s	The Girl with the Pearl Earring starring Kate Hudson and Ralph Fiennes	
2000s	Runaway Jury starring Will Smith	
2000s	A film adaptation of Esther Vilar's novel The Seven Fires of Mademoiselle written by Randi Mayem Singer	
2000s	Jo, an unaired TV pilot about a mother and daughter who run a veterinary hospital starring Andie MacDowell	
2000s	An untitled Western written by John Milius set in post-revolution Mexico	
2000s	Mrs. Darwin, a "period romance" written by Tim Rose Price about Emma Darwin's relationship with her husband Charles	
2000s	Alibi Club	
2000s	A film adaptation of Len Deighton's novel Bomber written by Leigh Jackson	
2000s	The Constant Gardener	
2000s	An untitled one-hour TV pilot for ABC and Touchstone Television	
2000s	A film adaptation of John Masefield's novel The Box of Delights written by Frank Cottrell-Boyce	
2000s	The Lone Ranger	
2010s	A film adaptation of Alan Cowell's novel The Terminal Spy co-written with David Scarpa	
2010s	A film adaptation of Ben Macintyre's novel Agent Zigzag written by Mark Bomback and Rowan Joffé	
2010s	A film adaptation of Charles Dickens' novel Dombey and Son	
2010s	An untitled fantasy film about Odysseus' journey back from Troy	
2010s	A film adaptation of Seth Grahame-Smith's novel Pride and Prejudice and Zombies	
2010s	A film adaptation of Ian McEwan's novella On Chesil Beach	
2010s	Reykjavík, a historical drama about the Reykjavík Summit written by Kevin Hood starring Michael Douglas and Christoph Waltz	
2010s	A film adaptation of John Wyndham's novel The Day of the Triffids written by Neil Cross	
2010s	The Comedian	
2010s	The One and Only Ivan	
2020s	A film adaptation of Henry James' novel The Ambassadors written by Janet Dulin Jones	
2020s	Gramercy Park, a TV series written by Janet Dulin Jones starring Millie Brady, Brian Cox, Gabriel Byrne and Mira Sorvino	
2020s	A film adaptation of Rumer Godden's novel China Court written by Brian Kinsey	

Preceded by Alfonso Cuarón	Harry Potter film director 2005	Succeeded by David Yates
