= What If God Were the Sun? =

- DVD cover
- Genre: Drama
- Based on: What If God Were the Sun? by John Edward
- Screenplay by: Janet Dulin Jones; Jamie Pachino
- Directed by: Stephen Tolkin
- Starring: Lacey Chabert; Gena Rowlands
- Theme music composer: Laura Karpman
- Country of origin: United States
- Original language: English

Production
- Producer: Greg Copeland
- Cinematography: Robin Loewen
- Editor: Gib Jaffe
- Running time: 88 minutes
- Production companies: JECO Productions; Old Beantown Films; Fox Television Studios

Original release
- Network: Lifetime
- Release: May 14, 2007

What If God Were the Sun? is a 2007 American television film directed by Stephen Tolkin and starring Lacey Chabert and Gena Rowlands. Written by Janet Dulin Jones and Jamie Pachino, based in part on a novel by John Edward, the film is about a dedicated nurse whose life is disrupted by her father's death. After losing her job, she finds comfort and inspiration in caring for a terminally ill woman with a quick wit and strong faith. What If God Were the Sun? was originally broadcast by Lifetime Television on May 14, 2007.

== Plot ==
Jamie is an ER nurse preparing for her upcoming wedding. When her policeman father unexpectedly dies in a hospital room adjacent to the one in which she's caring for a patient, her grief consumes her life, severely affecting her job performance and her relationship with her fiancé. Not until she meets Melissa, who is facing death from cancer with a sunny outlook and an unwavering faith in God, does Jamie begin to cope with her feelings and question her religious beliefs, including her conviction that the afterlife doesn't exist.

== Cast ==
Gena Rowlands and Lacey Chabert

- Lacey Chabert as Jamie Spagnoletti
- Gena Rowlands as Melissa Eisenbloom
- Sam Trammell as Jeff
- Sarah Rafferty as Rachel Eisenbloom
- Klea Scott as Carmen
- Amanda Brugel as Lupe
- Diana Reis as Katherine
- Kim Roberts as Maricela
- Maria Ricossa as Alma
- Illya Torres-Garner as Raul
- Ernesto Griffith as Captain Herbert
- Yogesh Chotalia as Dr. Browning
- David Stuart Evans as Michael
- Robert Marshall as Orlando
- Jan Skene as Dr. Greenberg

== Critical reception ==
In her review in Variety, Laura Fries said, "Rowlands is easily the best thing about the pic, and faces its many challenges, including cliches and colossally bad dialogue, with her reputation fairly unscathed . . . ultimately even [her] presence can't save the film from its own overwrought emotions and preposterous posthumous allusions. Perhaps the dead are always with us, but they would surely be grateful to miss this one."

Marilyn Moss of The Hollywood Reporter observed, "Its parts don't always mesh or make sense - storywise and otherwise - but anyone who stays with the characters long enough won't come away empty-handed . . . the story [wants] to be too many things and encase too many issues and events. Still, who cares about such small matters if it means getting to watch Gena Rowlands on the screen?"

== Nominations ==
Gena Rowlands was nominated for the Primetime Emmy Award for Outstanding Lead Actress in a Miniseries or Movie and the Screen Actors Guild Award for Outstanding Performance by a Female Actor in a Miniseries or Television Movie for her performance.
