= The Color of Love: Jacey's Story =

- Genre: Drama
- Written by: Nancey Silvers
- Directed by: Sheldon Larry
- Starring: Gena Rowlands; Louis Gossett Jr.; Penny Fuller; Stella Parton; Helen Floyd; Penny Bae Bridges
- Music by: J. A. C. Redford
- Country of origin: United States
- Original language: English

Production
- Executive producers: Louis Gossett Jr.; Dennis Considine; Jeffrey S. Grant; Dan Wigutow
- Cinematography: Karl Herrmann
- Editor: Paul LaMastra
- Running time: 120 minutes
- Production companies: Columbia TriStar International Television; Logo Entertainment; TeleVest Entertainment

Original release
- Network: CBS
- Release: March 19, 2000

The Color of Love: Jacey's Story is a 2000 American drama television film directed by Sheldon Larry, written by Nancey Silvers, and starring Gena Rowlands and Louis Gossett Jr. It aired on CBS on March 19, 2000.

== Plot ==
Orphaned after an accident, Jacey (Penny Bae Bridges) is put under the care of her grandmother, Georgia Porter (Gena Rowlands), a white Southern woman she had never met before. This comes as a shock to Georgia, who didn't know that her son-in-law was an African-American. Georgia and Jacey do their best to overcome the stereotypes they both hold, but things get even more complicated when Jacey's paternal grandfather, Lou Hastings (Louis Gossett Jr.), also claims custody.

== Cast ==
- Gena Rowlands as Georgia Porter
- Louis Gossett Jr. as Lou Hastings
- Penny Fuller as Madeleine Porter
- Stella Parton as Ellen Fuller
- Helen Floyd as Betty Watson
- Penny Bae Bridges as Jacey Hastings

== Production ==
Filming took place in Wilmington, North Carolina.

== Reception ==
Ramin Zahed of Variety gave the film a mixed review, stating: "Watching the sentimental telepic "The Color of Love: Jacey’s Story," feels a lot like visiting your grandma and eating her homemade pie. The experience is terribly predictable, but you go through with it, because of the comfort it offers."

For her performance, Gena Rowlands was nominated for a Primetime Emmy Award in the category of Outstanding Lead Actress in a Miniseries or a Movie. The film was also nominated for two Satellite Awards: one for Gossett Jr. in the category of Best Performance by an Actor in a Miniseries or a Motion Picture Made for Television, and one for Rowlands in the category of Best Performance by an Actress in a Miniseries or a Motion Picture Made for Television.
