= Spindoe =

1968 British TV crime series

- Created by: Robin Chapman
- Starring: Ray McAnally; Richard Hurndall; Glynn Edwards; Anthony Bate
- Country of origin: United Kingdom
- No. of series: 1
- No. of episodes: 6

Production
- Running time: 50 minutes
- Production company: Granada Television

Original release
- Network: ITV
- Release: 19 April – 24 May 1968

Related
- The Fellows

Spindoe is a British television series shown on ITV in the spring of 1968. It was named after the lead character, Alec Spindoe, a South London gangster; the plot of the series showed how Spindoe re-established his gangland empire after he had been supplanted during a term of imprisonment but found that once he had succeeded, he was no longer interested.

== Background ==
The character of London extortioner and gangland boss Alec Spindoe (played by Ray McAnally) first appeared in several episodes of Granada TV's serial The Fellows. In that series, two university academics based in Cambridge solve crimes in the outside world by pure theory, without ever leaving their university buildings. Spindoe falls foul of one of these theories when he panics over a threatening letter, in truth sent to him by one of the Fellows in the hope that he will react exactly as he does. His panic leads him to set up a jewellery shop robbery, where he is caught and arrested.

The following year, Spindoe returned in his own series, which depicted events after Spindoe's release from prison. The series, devised by Robin Chapman, tried to portray London gangland in a realistic and consequently unpleasant light. Characters can be both sympathetic and repulsive in the space of a few lines and there is little room for usual TV moralising.

== Plot outline ==
=== You Come Out From Nothing ===
At the beginning of the first episode, Spindoe is released from prison and is surprised to find that his deputy Eddie Edwards (Anthony Bate) is not there to meet him. North London gang boss Henry Mackleson (Richard Hurndall) is and offers him a chance to work for him, which Spindoe declines. Mackleson then arranges a 'demonstration' assassination attempt to impress on Spindoe his power. Spindoe discovers that his savings, crime empire and his wife Sheila, have been taken over by Edwards. By chance, he meets up with a former associate, Larry Bolsover, who is tricked into lending Spindoe his car to go and see Edwards. Edwards and his Norwegian 'chauffeur' Hans Burkwald then humiliate Spindoe, who turns the tables on Burkwald and steals his gun; he orders his wife to return to him "in two days, or die". Edwards then gives orders for Bolsover to be murdered to show that no-one should associate with Spindoe. Mackleson, hearing of the events at Edwards' house, begins his preparation to kill Sheila Spindoe and frame Alec for her murder. Burkwald, who secretly works for Mackleson rather than Edwards, arranges for his gun (complete with Spindoe's fingerprints) to be taken from him by Renata, a croupier at the club where Spindoe is gambling.

=== And The Blood Starts Flowing ===
Larry Bolsover's body is discovered by the police. Spindoe goes to see a private detective Ray Scaliger (George Sewell), to get evidence of his wife's adultery and to tell him who is visiting Edwards. When he returns to Bolsover's flat, he finds the police there who tell him of Bolsover's death. After giving a statement to the police, he visits his solicitor but is again waylaid by Mackleson who repeats his offer and gets another refusal. While snooping at Edwards' house, Scaliger is spotted and captured by Burkwald, and beaten up during interrogation by Edwards. Spindoe spots the absence of his gun and realises Renata has stolen it; he is unable to persuade her to explain what happened but she does introduce him to the last man to speak to Larry Bolsover, a waiter. The waiter identifies Burkwald as the man who took Bolsover to his death. Scaliger returns to Edwards' house where he spots Edwards and Burkwald leaving (they are going to Mackleson to discuss merging their operations) and so phones Spindoe to tell him he can visit. Spindoe's letter repeating his ultimatum to his wife is delivered; Mackleson's plot to murder Sheila is put into operation. Scaliger observes the Spindoe lookalike arriving and enters the house just as Sheila is murdered using the gun with Spindoe's fingerprints (the maid is conveniently able to witness the Spindoe lookalike) Spindoe arrives to find his wife dead and Scaliger presenting him with his letter threatening to kill her.

=== But You're Back and Fighting ===
Edwards, distressed at the death of Sheila, believes Spindoe killed her and wants revenge. Mackleson orders Renata (who has her suspicions of him) to get Spindoe out of her flat, which sets him thinking. Spindoe goes to one of his former betting shops, now part of Edwards' empire, where he meets Billy Humphries (Glynn Edwards), a former associate who has faked his death. Humphries tells Spindoe that Renata and Burkwald are all working for Mackleson, which confirms to Spindoe that Mackleson killed Sheila. Spindoe tries to get Renata to confess; she admits working for Mackleson. Scaliger, who has also worked out that Spindoe was being framed for Sheila's murder, tells the police. Spindoe then arranges a meeting with Mackleson, deliberately revealing to him that he knows Renata's role. She is summoned to Mackleson who has her face slashed with a razor as punishment. Spindoe and Humphries go to Edwards' house and when Burkwald returns he is forced to say where Edwards is. A morose Edwards is still vowing revenge against Spindoe when Spindoe arrives to confront him. Spindoe tells him Burkwald is working for Mackleson and explains why Mackleson had Sheila killed; Edwards is reluctant to believe it. Just as Spindoe is about to shoot Edwards, Scaliger intervenes and in the struggle Edwards manages to escape.

=== You Start Winning ===
At the funeral of Sheila, Spindoe turns up despite the danger. Edwards' henchmen are about to stab him at the graveside when Spindoe spots the knife and escapes. Edwards begins to suspect Burkwald's loyalty, but is assuaged. Edwards and Burkwald are arrested for the murder of Bolsover. Spindoe is beginning to receive declarations of loyalty from his old associates but he is arrested for the murder of his wife. When they are brought face to face by the police they work out that each can clear the other. Mackleson sends his henchman Webster to try to recruit Scaliger, who refuses. Humphries also fails to persuade him to help free Spindoe but does send him to see Renata in hospital. Although Renata blames Spindoe for the attack on her, she tells Humphries how the gun was picked up in return for a pledge that Spindoe will pay for her face to be rebuilt. Humphries and Scaliger then agree to bail Spindoe out and Scaliger tells Renata's story to the police.

When Spindoe is released, he is angry that Humphries had paid Scaliger and pledged that he must help Renata (which he refuses to do). Edwards' solicitor is unable to find a legal way of bailing him so he arranges with Mackleson to spring him from the Magistrates' Court. Mackleson hides him at his house, telling Edwards that he had framed Spindoe for Sheila's murder. The police apply pressure to Burkwald who admits to working for Mackleson but refuses to sign a statement. Mackleson invites Spindoe to dinner, which Spindoe knows to be an invitation to kill and dispose of Edwards; he accepts and arranges for his reunited team to be present to carry out the murder. Edwards is duly murdered. Spindoe and Mackleson discuss the merging of their operations but Spindoe makes an excuse so that he can go back to assess his newly reconquered empire; Mackleson's deputy Webster is there to 'go through the books' with him.

=== How is it You're Losing? ===
Billy Humphries drives an unconscious Webster back to Mackleson's house. The police go through the situation and work out that a gang war is about to break out and decide that Scaliger is the key; before they can get to him, Mackleson's associates kidnap him. He again refuses to work for Mackleson despite his threats and endures a beating. Mackleson prepares an arson attack on many of Spindoe's clubs. Spindoe is making his protection rackets productive, only wanting to control South London. He decides to keep the legitimate betting shops but sell the nightclubs. Humphries believes he must have a deal with Mackleson and produces Renata asking for plastic surgery but Spindoe again refuses to help her because of her betrayal. Scaliger manages to escape from Mackleson's house and goes to Spindoe, trying to sell him the story of Mackleson's arson attack; Spindoe refuses to buy but learns by telephoning Mackleson that the attacks have already happened. In the morning, Spindoe orders a revenge attack on Mackleson's businesses that afternoon, which Scaliger leads. Mackleson avenges this attack by kidnapping Billy Humphries. Spindoe's cold reaction to Humphries' kidnap outrages Scaliger who goes out to search for him, finds him but cannot free him. Mackleson arranges for the police to be tipped off about Spindoe's henchmen who murdered Edwards and they implicate Spindoe. Realising he is in danger of returning to prison, Spindoe goes off to murder Mackleson; he recruits Scaliger, who is more concerned with freeing Billy. In the attack at Mackleson's house, Humphries is killed and Mackleson survives; Spindoe escapes.

=== Now You're Running ===
Scaliger escapes Mackleson's house after the shootout, leaving Billy, dead, behind. Webster takes care of Billy's body just as the police arrive, who were called by Mackleson. Spindoe calls Ruth for help from a phone box. He visits Ruth but Mackleson knows where he is. Scaliger calls Spindoe at Ruth's place only to leave a brief message: "Billy". Mackleson predicts that Scaliger will urge Spindoe to join him to return to Mackleson's. Spindoe sets off on foot while Ruth leaves in her car. The busy Scaliger tracks Webster to a café suggesting they both need information on Spindoe. Webster tells Scaliger that Mackleson considers Spindoe his property. Webster receives a call, telling him that Spindoe is on the move just as 'Down By the Riverside' plays on the radio. Webster waits to ambush Spindoe on his walk but Scaliger arrives to shoot first. Ruth arrives in her car to warn Spindoe and is shot at by Webster, who had been wounded. Webster then calls from a phone box to report his failure. While Spindoe stops at a putting green, Scaliger stops Ruth in the road to confront her. He tells her how Spindoe used Billy as a cover while being shot at earlier in Mackleson's house. A disbelieving Ruth drives off.

Spindoe tries to steal a Morris 1100 but is thwarted by a car alarm and runs away. The waiting police are alerted to the attempted theft. Webster, in his car fitted with a police radio, now knows Spindoe's whereabouts in Forest Hill and sets off, closely followed by the persistent Scaliger. Ruth somehow manages to find Spindoe first and he drives away in her car. Ruth and Spindoe somehow evade Webster, who strangely has a flat tyre, all while Scaliger looks on in his car. Now safe, Spindoe stops and orders Ruth to go south. She accuses Spindoe of using her just as he did Billy. Spindoe tells her he just wants her safe and she agrees to leave him. Spindoe sets off once again on foot and before Ruth can leave, Webster catches up with her, forcing her to tell him that Spindoe is headed for Bermondsey. Before Webster can commandeer Ruth's car, the waiting Scaliger springs into action, immobilises and disarms Webster before leaving with Ruth.

Spindoe rests with two homeless drunks who cause him to question his existence. Detective Peach has narrowed Spindoe's location to either Bermondsey or Rotherhithe as Webster has been picked up by the police. Spindoe reaches Marigold Street undetected while Scaliger stops his car to tell Ruth to catch a taxi home, telling her that Spindoe has used her just as he used Billy. "It's only what people do that tells you what they are", he tells her. After having to pretend to be lovers to avoid a patrolling constable, Scaliger decides to keep Ruth with him. Spindoe reaches the house of Terry, a boat owner who Spindoe did a favour for eight years earlier. Detective Peach is told that Spindoe has now been seen at St Xavier's dock and orders his men to apprehend him downstream. As Spindoe passes under London Bridge on Terry's boat in the early morning light, he believes he is home free.

Scaliger calls Mackleson from a phone box, inviting him to go and see Spindoe die in Greenwich and informing him that he was responsible for Webster being apprehended. The police have blocked the River Thames with Detective Peach from a boat pleading with Spindoe to give himself up. Terry's boat finds dry land, allowing Spindoe to escape but he is quickly surrounded by police. Scaliger and Ruth also arrive as well as Mackleson, with Scaliger ordering Ruth to call the facially disfigured Renata to come down as well. Spindoe finds sanctuary in a deserted building, which is quickly sealed off by the ever-growing number of armed police. Scaliger manages to infiltrate the police cordon and enter the building before any of them, telling Spindoe that he has a message from the late Billy. Spindoe taunts Scaliger before fleeing again but he is finally shot by the police, falling into the river as a pleased Mackleson watches from a safe distance through his binoculars. Detective Peach informs Scaliger that he is under arrest for obstruction but Scaliger counters by offering Mackleson for assault on the scarred Renata as well as the murder of Eddie Edwards. Mackleson is taken away by one group of police while Spindoe's lifeless body is carried away by another. Scaliger assures Ruth that Spindoe was dead before she even met him.

== Cast and crew ==
The character of seedy-but-wise private detective Scaliger (George Sewell) was supposed to appear in a subsequent Robin Chapman series, the controversial Big Breadwinner Hog in 1969 but Sewell's unavailability led to the part being re-written and the character renamed. Spindoe was directed by Cormac Newell, better known as Mike Newell, director of Four Weddings and a Funeral and Donnie Brasco. Glynn Edwards was knifed to death by Jack Carter in "Get Carter" and later better known in his role as 'Dave the Barman' in Minder.

=== Cast ===
- Alec Spindoe (Ray McAnally)
- Scaliger (George Sewell)
- Billy (Glynn Edwards)
- Peach (Bryan Marshall)
- Tierney (Basil Dignam)
- Mackelson ( Richard Hurndall)
- Edwards (Anthony Bate)
- Renata (Rachel Herbert)
