= Jan Jones =

Jan Jones may refer to:

- Jan Jones (novelist) (born 1955), software engineer and novelist
- Jan Jones (Georgia politician) (born 1958), state representative in the U.S. state of Georgia
- Jan Laverty Jones (born 1949), mayor of Las Vegas 1991–1999

== See also ==
- Janet Jones (disambiguation)
