= Malèna (soundtrack) =

Film score by Ennio Morricone
- Released: 2000

Malèna is the soundtrack of the 2000 film Malèna starring Monica Bellucci, Giuseppe Sulfaro, Luciano Federico and Matilde Piana. The original score was composed by Ennio Morricone.

The album was nominated for the Academy Award for Best Original Score and the Golden Globe Award for Best Original Score.

The title track "Malèna" has been recorded by both Yo-Yo Ma, and sung by Hayley Westenra with lyrics by Hayley Westenra.

== Track list ==
1. Inchini Ipocriti E Disperazione
2. Malèna
3. Passeggiata In Paese
4. Visioni
5. Nella Casa...
6. Malèna (End Titles)
7. Linciaggio
8. Orgia
9. Il Ritorno
10. Bisbigli Della Gente
11. Ma L'Amore No
12. Casino Bolero
13. Altro Casino
14. Visioni (Fantasie D'Amore)
15. Cinema D'Altri Tempi
16. Ipocrisie
17. Pensieri Di Sesso
18. Momenti Difficili
