= Big Breadwinner Hog =

Television series

- Created by: Robin Chapman
- Starring: Peter Egan; Timothy West; Donald Burton; Rosemary McHale
- Country of origin: United Kingdom
- No. of episodes: 8

Production
- Running time: 50 minutes
- Production company: Granada Television

Original release
- Network: ITV
- Release: 11 April – 30 May 1969

Big Breadwinner Hog is a British television thriller serial devised by Robin Chapman, produced by Granada TV and transmitted in eight parts, starting at 9.00 pm on 11 April 1969 on the ITV network.

== Overview ==
The series focussed on the ruthless rise through the criminal underworld of the trendy young London gangster Hogarth (Peter Egan). He exploits the resources of a declining gangster, Ryan (Godfrey Quigley), to take over the dominant crime syndicate Scot–Yanks, controlled by the equally ruthless and manipulative Lennox (Timothy West). The key to Hogarth's success is knowledge of a murder arranged by Lennox, of which there is a crucial witness, Ackerman (Donald Burton), an ex-private eye who has been blackmailed into working for Scot–Yanks and bitterly resents Lennox.

The eight-part serial was widely condemned at the time for its amorality and violence. Its first episode featured a scene in which a jar of hydrochloric acid was thrown into a rival's face. "Barely minutes after the first episode was transmitted, the Granada TV switchboard was inundated" with viewers' complaints about the violence and the second episode was preceded by a Granada apology for the previous week's episode. Granada toned down some of the more violent aspects of later episodes but despite this, viewer complaints continued and from episode 5 some ITV regions moved transmission to a later timeslot. Southern Television and Anglia Television stopped transmission of the serial.

The serial was directed by Mike Newell (later of Four Weddings and a Funeral) and Michael Apted. It gave an early role to John Challis, later Boycie of Only Fools and Horses and an important role for Priscilla Morgan. Peter Egan is also better known these days for sitcoms like Ever Decreasing Circles (1984–1989), Joint Account (1989) and Home Again (2006).

== Cast ==
- Hogarth – Peter Egan
- Edge – Rosemary McHale
- Ryan – Godfrey Quigley
- Spicer – Barry Linehan
- Singleton – Tony Steedman
- Lennox – Timothy West
- Gould – Hamilton Dyce
- Moira – Priscilla Morgan
- Ackerman – Donald Burton
- Greenwood – Brian McDermott
- Izzard – Alan Browning
- Grange – David Leland
- Raymond – James Hunter
- Nicholson – Tenniel Evans
- Walker – Arthur Pentelow
- Parker – John Horsley
- Raspberry – Peter Thomas
- Operative – John Challis

== Critical Reception ==
Leslie Halliwell was dismissive of Big Breadwinner Hog, describing the programme as a "tawdry mixture of Scarface and Brighton Rock, much criticised for its violence". TV historian Dave Rogers gave a more positive assessment of Big Breadwinner Hog, calling it "an ambitious attempt to portray the criminal fraternity in realistic terms".

== DVD release ==
The series was released on Region 2 DVD in a box set with Chapman's earlier Spindoe by Network DVD in June 2007. The series is presented on the DVD from the original videotapes, except episode one (containing the infamous acid-throwing scene) which exists only via a telerecorded film copy, where the image quality is noticeably inferior to the other episodes. Disc 3 (the 3rd "Hog" disk) contains an episode of the 1972 LWT series, Villains, a serial as seen from the bank robbers point of view. The included episode focuses on womanising safe-cracker Charles Grindley as played by Bob Hoskins.
