= Gena Rowlands =

American actress (1930–2024)

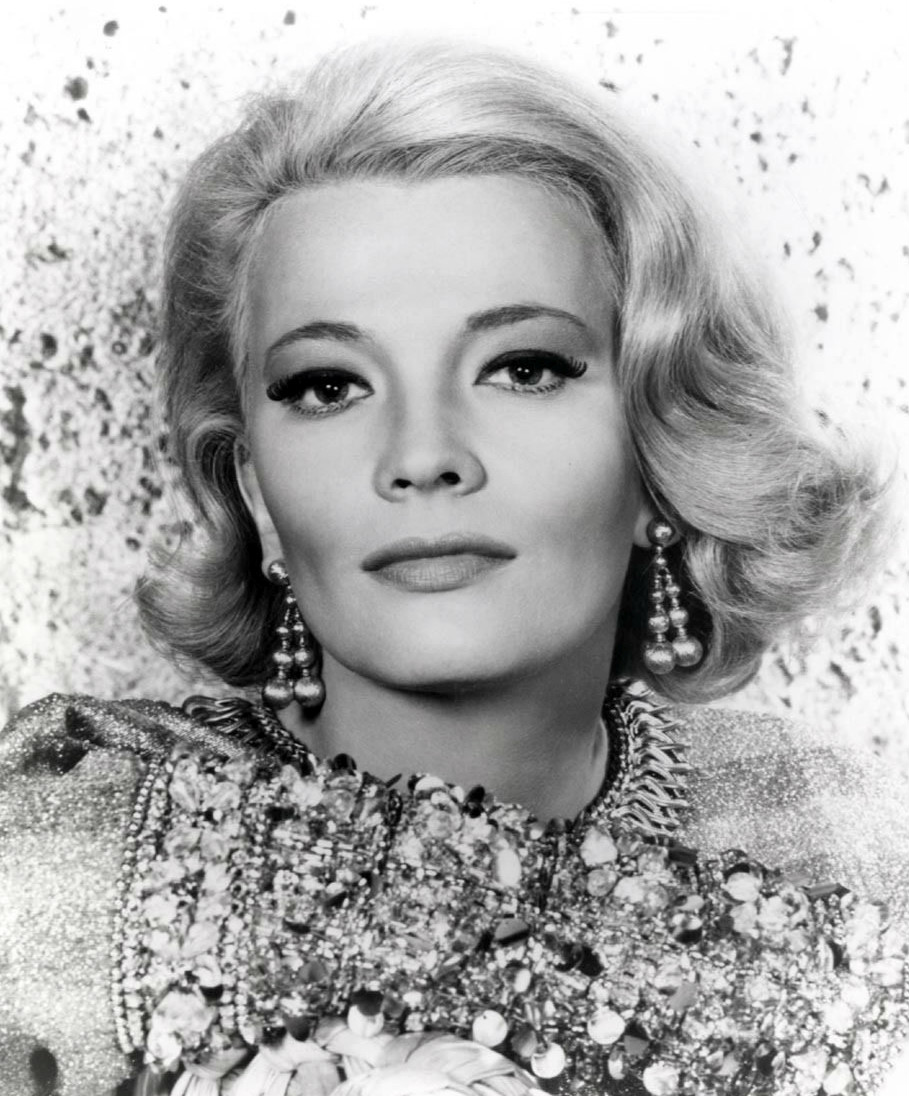
- Rowlands in 1968
- Born: Virginia Cathryn Rowlands; June 19, 1930; Madison, Wisconsin, U.S.
- Died: August 14, 2024 (aged 94); Indian Wells, California, U.S.
- Burial place: Westwood Village Memorial Park Cemetery
- Education: American Academy of Dramatic Arts
- Occupation: Actress
- Years active: 1949–2014
- Spouses: John Cassavetes (m. 1954; died 1989); Robert Forrest (m. 2012)
- Children: Nick; Alexandra; Zoe
- Parents: Edwin Myrwyn Rowlands; Lady Rowlands

Virginia Cathryn "Gena" Rowlands (/ˈdʒɛnə ˈroʊləndz/; June 19, 1930 – August 14, 2024) was an American actress, whose career in film, stage, and television spanned nearly seven decades. She was a four-time Emmy Award and two-time Golden Globe winner, and she was twice nominated for the Academy Award for Best Actress.

She rose to prominence for her collaborations with her actor-director husband John Cassavetes in ten films, including A Woman Under the Influence (1974) and Gloria (1980), both of which earned her Oscar nominations. She also won the Silver Bear for Best Actress for Opening Night (1977). Her other roles included William Friedkin's The Brink's Job (1978), Woody Allen's Another Woman (1988), Jim Jarmusch's Night on Earth (1991), Mira Nair's Hysterical Blindness (2002), and her son Nick Cassavetes's The Notebook (2004).

In 2021, Rowlands was called by critic Richard Brody of The New Yorker as "the most important and original movie actor of the past half century-plus." In November 2015, she received an Honorary Academy Award in recognition of her unique screen performances.

== Early years ==
Rowlands was born on June 19, 1930, in Madison, Wisconsin. Her mother, Mary Allen (née Neal), was a housewife who later worked as an actress under the stage name Lady Rowlands. Her father, Edwin Myrwyn Rowlands, was a banker and state legislator. He was a member of the Wisconsin Progressive Party, and was of Welsh descent. She had an elder brother, David Rowlands.

Her family moved to Washington, D.C., in 1939, when Edwin was appointed to a position in the United States Department of Agriculture; moved to Milwaukee, Wisconsin, in 1942, when he was appointed branch manager of the Office of Price Administration; and later moved to Minneapolis, Minnesota. From 1947 to 1950, she attended the University of Wisconsin, where she was a popular student already renowned for her beauty. While in college, she was a member of Kappa Kappa Gamma. She left for New York City to study drama at the American Academy of Dramatic Arts.

== Career ==
=== Early roles (1952–1967) ===
Publicity photo, 1955

In the early 1950s, Rowlands performed with repertory theatre companies and at the Provincetown Playhouse. She made her Broadway debut in The Seven Year Itch and toured in a national production of the play. In 1956, she starred in the Broadway play Middle of the Night opposite Edward G. Robinson.

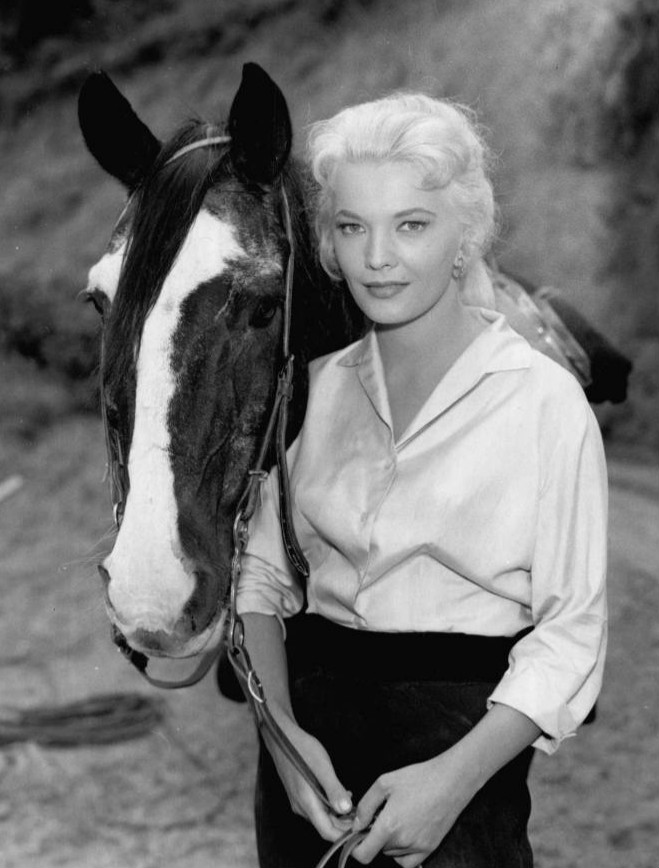
Rowlands on Laramie in 1959

Rowlands costarred with Paul Stewart in the 26-episode syndicated TV series Top Secret (1954–55). She guest-starred on such anthology television series as Robert Montgomery Presents, Armstrong Circle Theatre, Studio One, Appointment with Adventure, The United States Steel Hour, and Goodyear Television Playhouse, all in 1955. In 1959, Rowlands appeared in the Western series Laramie, alongside her husband John Cassavetes in the detective series Johnny Staccato, and in the Western series Riverboat, starring Darren McGavin. In 1961, she appeared in the adventure series The Islanders, set in the South Pacific, and in Target: The Corruptors!, starring Stephen McNally. She guest-starred in The Lloyd Bridges Show, the detective series 77 Sunset Strip, Kraft Suspense Theatre, the Westerns Bonanza and The Virginian, and Breaking Point, all in 1963. In 1964, she guest-starred in the medical drama Dr. Kildare and in two episodes of Burke's Law. She appeared in four episodes of Alfred Hitchcock Presents, three of which were after the series had been renamed The Alfred Hitchcock Hour. In 1967, she was cast as socialite Adrienne Van Leyden in the prime-time ABC soap opera Peyton Place.

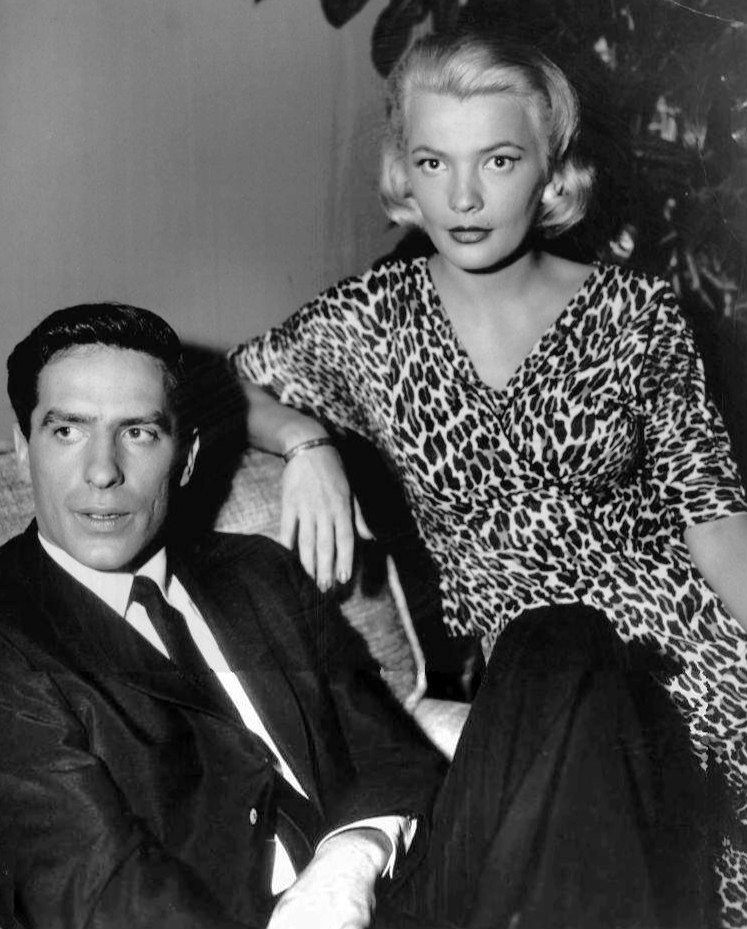
Rowlands with husband John Cassavetes in TV series Johnny Staccato, 1959

Rowlands made her film debut in The High Cost of Loving in 1958. In 1962, she starred in director David Miller's Lonely Are the Brave, with Kirk Douglas and Walter Matthau. She played the former lover of the Kirk Douglas character, now the wife of the Douglas character's best friend.

=== Cassavetes era (1963–1984) ===
Rowlands and Cassavetes made ten films together: A Child Is Waiting (1963), Faces (1968), Machine Gun McCain (1969), Minnie and Moskowitz (1971), A Woman Under the Influence (1974; nomination for Academy Award for Best Actress), Two-Minute Warning (1976), Opening Night (1977), Gloria (1980; nomination for Academy Award for Best Actress), Tempest (1982), and Love Streams (1984).

According to Boston University film scholar Ray Carney, Rowlands sought to suppress an early version of Cassavetes's first film, Shadows, that Carney says he rediscovered after decades of searching. Rowlands also became involved in the screenings of Husbands and Love Streams, according to Carney. The UCLA Film and Television Archive mounted a restoration of Husbands, as it was pruned down (without Cassavetes's consent, and in violation of his contract) by Columbia Pictures several months after its release, in an attempt to restore as much of the removed content as possible. At Rowlands's request, UCLA created an alternative print with almost ten minutes of content edited out, as Rowlands felt that these scenes were in poor taste. The alternative print is the only one that has been made available for rental.

=== Late career (1985–2014) ===
In 1985, Rowlands played the mother in the critically acclaimed made-for-TV movie An Early Frost. She won an Emmy for her portrayal of former First Lady of the United States Betty Ford in the 1987 made-for-TV movie The Betty Ford Story.

In 1988, Rowlands starred in Woody Allen's dramatic film Another Woman. She played Marion Post, a middle-aged professor who is prompted to a journey of self-discovery when she overhears the therapy sessions of another woman (Mia Farrow). The review in Time Out described the character's trajectory: "Marion gets to thinking, and is appalled to realise that so many assumptions about her own life and marriage are largely unfounded: in her desire for a controlled existence, she has evaded the emotional truth about relationships with her best friend (Sandy Dennis), brother (Harris Yulin) and husband (Ian Holm)." Time Out praised the "marvellous" performances in the film, adding, "Rowlands' perfectly pitched approach to a demanding role is particularly stunning." Film4 called her performance "sublime", while Roger Ebert noted that it marked a considerable change in tone from her work with Cassavetes, thus showing "how good an actress Rowlands has been all along."

In 1995, Rowlands appeared as Julia Roberts's mother in the comedy-drama film Something to Talk About, and in 1998, she played Sandra Bullock's mother in the dramatic film Hope Floats. In 2002, Rowlands appeared in Mira Nair's HBO movie Hysterical Blindness, for which she won her third Emmy.

In 2004, she starred as the older version of Rachel McAdams's character in the romantic drama film The Notebook alongside James Garner as her husband, which was directed by her son Nick Cassavetes. The same year, she won her first Daytime Emmy for her role as Mrs. Evelyn Ritchie in the made-for-TV movie The Incredible Mrs. Ritchie.

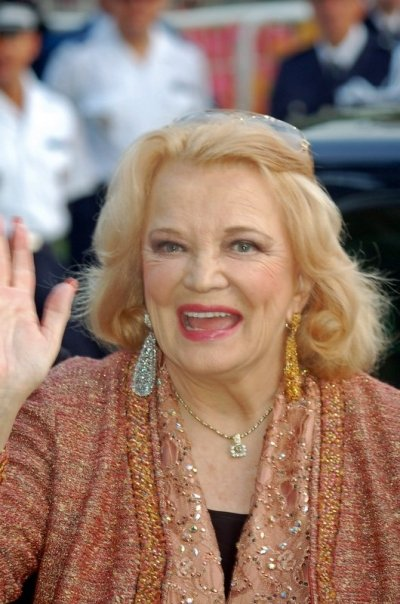
Rowlands at the 2006 Cannes Film Festival

In 2005, she appeared opposite Kate Hudson, Peter Sarsgaard, and John Hurt in the gothic thriller The Skeleton Key. The next year she appeared as Mrs. Hellman in an episode from the third season of Numb3rs. She played a Nazi survivor whose whole family was killed. The family owned a painting that the Nazis confiscated. Later on the painting reappeared. The new owner lent the painting to an art gallery in Los Angeles but while on display it was stolen. FBI agent Don Eppes, played by Rob Morrow, tries to figure out what really happened. Rowlands received positive reviews for this role. She has been a spokesperson for people who were persecuted by the Nazis.

In 2007, she played a supporting role opposite Parker Posey and Melvil Poupaud in Broken English, an independent American feature written and directed by her daughter Zoe Cassavetes. In 2009, she appeared on an episode of Monk ("Mr. Monk and the Lady Next Door"). On March 2, 2010, she appeared on an episode of NCIS as lead character Leroy Jethro Gibbs's former mother-in-law, who is embroiled in a murder investigation. In 2014, she starred in the film adaptation of Six Dance Lessons in Six Weeks. In 2015, she described herself as generally retired from acting.

== Personal life ==
Rowlands was married to John Cassavetes from March 9, 1954, until his death on February 3, 1989. They met at the American Academy at Carnegie Hall, where they were both students. They had three children, all actor-directors: Nick, Alexandra, and Zoe.

Rowlands married retired businessman Robert Forrest in 2012.

Rowlands stated that she was a fan of actress Bette Davis while growing up. She played Davis's daughter in the 1979 made-for-TV film Strangers.

=== Illness and death ===
On June 24, 2024, Nick Cassavetes announced that his mother had been living with Alzheimer's disease for the previous five years. Rowlands died from complications of Alzheimer's disease at her home in Indian Wells, California, on August 14, 2024, at the age of 94.

== Filmography ==
=== Film ===
Year	Title	Role	Notes
1958	The High Cost of Loving	Jenny Fry	
1959	Shadows	Woman in Nightclub	Uncredited; First film collaboration with John Cassavetes
1962	Lonely Are the Brave	Jerry Bondi	
1962	The Spiral Road	Els	
1963	A Child Is Waiting	Sophie Widdicombe	
1967	Tony Rome	Rita Kosterman	
1968	Faces	Jeannie Rapp	
1969	Machine Gun McCain	Rosemary Scott	
1971	Minnie and Moskowitz	Minnie Moore	
1974	A Woman Under the Influence	Mabel Longhetti	
1976	Two-Minute Warning	Janet	
1977	Opening Night	Myrtle Gordon	
1978	The Brink's Job	Mary Pino	
1980	Gloria	Gloria Swenson	
1982	Tempest	Antonia Dimitrius	
1984	Love Streams	Sarah Lawson	
1987	Light of Day	Jeanette Rasnick	
1988	Another Woman	Marion Post	
1989	I'm Almost Not Crazy: John Cassavetes, the Man & His Work	Herself	Documentary short
1990	Hollywood Mavericks	Herself	Documentary
1991	Once Around	Marilyn Bella	
1991	Night on Earth	Victoria Snelling	Segment: "Los Angeles"
1991	Ted & Venus	Mrs. Turner	
1993	Silent Cries	Peggy Sutherland	
1995	Something to Talk About	Georgia King	
1995	The Neon Bible	Mae Morgan	
1996	Unhook the Stars	Mildred "Millie" Hawks	
1997	She's So Lovely	Miss Jane Green	
1998	Paulie	Ivy	
1998	Hope Floats	Ramona Calvert	
1998	The Mighty	Gram	
1998	Playing by Heart	Hannah	
1999	The Weekend	Laura Ponti	
2000	Light Keeps Me Company	Herself	Documentary
2003	Broadway: The Golden Age	Herself	Documentary
2004	Taking Lives	Mrs. Asher	
2004	The Notebook	Older Allie Calhoun	
2005	The Skeleton Key	Violet Devereaux	
2006	Paris, je t'aime	Gena	Segment: "Quartier Latin"
2007	Broken English	Vivien Wilder-Mann	
2007	Persepolis	Grandmother (voice)	English-dubbed version
2011	Olive	Tess M. Powell	
2012	Yellow	Mimi	
2013	Parts Per Billion	Esther	
2014	Six Dance Lessons in Six Weeks	Lily Harrison	Final film role

=== Television ===
Year	Title	Role	Notes
1954	Top Secret	Powell	Episode: "This Man Is Death"
1955	The Way of the World	Paula Graves	
1955	Robert Montgomery Presents	Myrtle Wilson	Season 6 Episode 33: "The Great Gatsby"
1955	Ponds Theater	Janet	Season 2 Episode 34: "The Ways of Courage"
1955	Armstrong Circle Theatre	Lugene	Season 5 Episode 40: "Time for Love"
1955	Studio One on Hollywood	Betty	Season 7 Episode 50: "A Chance of Love"
1955	Appointment with Adventure	(1) Lorri (2) Sally Mason	(1) Season 1 Episode 14: "Caribbean Cruise" (2) Season 1 Episode 23: "The Pirate's House"
1955	The United States Steel Hour	Lily	Season 3 Episode 7: "Ashton Buys a Horse"
1955	Goodyear Television Playhouse	(1) Eve (2) Betty	(1) Season 4 Episode 15: "Do It Yourself" (2) Season 5 Episode 3: "The Expendable House"
1958	General Electric Theater	Dorothy Dickenson	Season 7 Episode 12: "The Girl with the Flaxen Hair"
1959	Laramie	Laurel DeWalt	Season 1 Episode 9: "The Run to Tumavaca"
1959	Johnny Staccato	Nina Van Ness	Season 1 Episode 9: "Fly Baby, Fly"
1959	Markham	Rita Evans	Season 1 Episode 28: "The Altar"
1959	Riverboat	Rose Traynor	Season 1 Episode 14: "Guns for Empire"
1960	Adventures in Paradise	Dr. Abigail Brent	Season 1 Episode 28: "The Death-Divers"
1960	Alfred Hitchcock Presents	Lucille Jones	Season 6 Episode 2: "The Doubtful Doctor"
1960	The Tab Hunter Show	Barbara / Penelope	Season 1 Episode 8: "Double Trouble"
1961	The Islanders	Pepper Mint	Season 1 Episode 20: "Island Witness"
1961	Target: The Corruptors!	Marian Praisewater	Season 1 Episode 5: "The Poppy Vendor"
1961–62	87th Precinct	Teddy Carella	(1) Season 1 Episode 1: "The Floater" (1961) (2) Season 1 Episode 2: "Lady in Waiting" (1961) (3) Season 1 Episode 6: "Occupation, Citizen" (1961) (4) Season 1 Episode 25: "Step Forward" (1962)
1962	The Alfred Hitchcock Hour	Helen Martin	Season 1 Episode 11: "Ride the Nightmare"
1963	The Dick Powell Theatre	Mrs. Canfield	Season 2 Episode 15: "Project X"
1963	The Lloyd Bridges Show	Leslie Kaufman	Season 1 Episode 20: "A Personal Matter"
1963	77 Sunset Strip	Barbara Adams	Season 5 Episode 25: "Flight 307"
1963	Bonanza	Ragan Miller	Season 5 Episode 1: "She Walks in Beauty"
1963	The Virginian	Savannah	Season 2 Episode 3: "No Tears for Savannah"
1963	Bob Hope Presents the Chrysler Theatre	June	Season 1 Episode 9: "It's Mental Work"
1963	Breaking Point	Shelley Osborne Peters	Season 1 Episode 14: "Heart of Marble, Body of Shame"
1963	The Alfred Hitchcock Hour	Louise Henderson	Season 1 Episode 23: "The Lonely Hours"
1963	Kraft Suspense Theatre	Janet Cord	Season 1 Episode 6: "One Step Down"
1964	The Alfred Hitchcock Hour	Diana Justin	Season 2 Episode 19: "Murder Case"
1964	Dr. Kildare	Helen Scott	Season 3 Episode 20: "To Walk in Grace"
1964	Burke's Law	(1) Paulette Shane (2) Mitzi Carlisle	(1) Season 1 Episode 17: "Who Killed What's His Name?" (2) Season 1 Episode 28: "Who Killed Annie Foran?"
1965	Kraft Suspense Theatre	Lois Baxter	Season 2 Episode 18: "Won't It Ever Be Morning?
1966	Run for Your Life	Charlotte Hyde	Season 1 Episode 17: "The Rediscovery of Charlotte Hyde"
1966	The Long, Hot Summer	Karen Roberts	Season 1 Episode 20: "From This Day Forward"
1967	The Road West	Karen Collier	Season 1 Episode 16: "Beyond the Hill"
1967	The Girl from U.N.C.L.E.	Baroness Ingrid	Season 1 Episode 20: "The Fountain of Youth Affair"
1967	Peyton Place	Adrienne Van Leyden	39 episodes
1968	Garrison's Gorillas	Duchess	Season 1 Episode 24: "The Frame-Up"
1971	Medical Center	Frances Delaney	Season 2 Episode 23: "The Man in Hiding"
1972	Circle of Fear	Kate Lucas	Season 1 Episode 2: "The Concrete Captain"
1973	Medical Center	Karen Coberly	Season 5 Episode 8: "Child of Violence"
1974	Marcus Welby, M.D.	Lorrain Denby	Season 6 Episode 13: "The 266 Days"
1975	Columbo	Elizabeth Van Wyck	Season 4 Episode 5: "Playback"
1978	A Question of Love	Linda Ray Guettner	Television movie
1979	Strangers: The Story of a Mother and Daughter	Abigail Mason	Television movie
1983	Thursday's Child	Victoria Alden	Television movie
1983	Faerie Tale Theatre	Witch	Season 2 Episode 1: "Rapunzel"
1985	An Early Frost	Katherine Pierson	Television movie
1987	The Betty Ford Story	Betty Ford	Television movie
1990	Montana	Bess Guthrie	Television movie
1991	Face of a Stranger	Pat Foster	Television movie
1992	Crazy in Love	Honora Swift	Television movie
1993	Anything for John	Herself	Television documentary
1994	Parallel Lives	Francie Pomerantz	Television movie
1998	Grace and Glorie	Grace Stiles	Television movie
1998	Best Friends for Life	Mrs. Harriet Cahill	Television movie
2000	The Color of Love: Jacey's Story	Georgia Porter	Television movie
2001	Wild Iris	Minnie Brinn	Television movie
2002	Charms for the Easy Life	Ms. Charlie Kate	Television movie
2002	Hysterical Blindness	Virginia Miller	Television movie
2003	The Incredible Mrs. Ritchie	Evelyn Ritchie	Television movie
2006	Numb3rs	Mrs. Hellman	Season 3 Episode 3: "Provenance"
2007	What If God Were the Sun?	Melissa Eisenbloom	Television movie
2009	Monk	Marge Johnson	Season 7 Episode 12: "Mr. Monk & the Lady Next Door"
2010	NCIS	Joann Fielding	Season 7 Episode 16: "Mother's Day"

== Awards and nominations ==
=== Academy Awards ===
Year	Category	Nominated work	Result	Ref.
Academy Awards
1974	Best Actress	A Woman Under the Influence	Nominated	
1980	Best Actress	Gloria	Nominated	
2015	Honorary Academy Award	—N/a	Won	

=== Emmy Awards ===
Year	Category	Nominated work	Result	Ref.
Primetime Emmy Awards
1986	Outstanding Lead Actress in a Miniseries or a Special	An Early Frost	Nominated	
1987	Outstanding Lead Actress in a Miniseries or a Special	The Betty Ford Story	Won	
1992	Outstanding Lead Actress in a Miniseries or a Special	Face of a Stranger	Won	
2000	Outstanding Lead Actress in a Miniseries or a Movie	The Color of Love: Jacey's Story	Nominated	
2002	Outstanding Lead Actress in a Miniseries or a Movie	Wild Iris	Nominated	
2003	Outstanding Supporting Actress in a Miniseries or a Movie	Hysterical Blindness	Won	
2007	Outstanding Actress in a Miniseries or Movie	What If God Were the Sun?	Nominated	
2009	Outstanding Guest Actress in a Comedy Series	Monk	Nominated	
Daytime Emmy Awards
2004	Outstanding Performer in a Children/Youth/Family Special	The Incredible Mrs. Ritchie	Won	

=== Golden Globe Awards ===
Year	Category	Nominated work	Result	Ref.
Golden Globe Awards
1974	Best Actress in a Motion Picture – Drama	A Woman Under the Influence	Won	
1977	Best Actress in a Motion Picture – Drama	Opening Night	Nominated	
1980	Best Actress in a Motion Picture – Drama	Gloria	Nominated	
1983	Best Actress in a Miniseries or Motion Picture Made for Television	Thursday's Child	Nominated	
1985	Best Actress in a Miniseries or Motion Picture Made for Television	An Early Frost	Nominated	
1987	Best Actress in a Miniseries or Motion Picture Made for Television	The Betty Ford Story	Won	
1992	Best Supporting Actress – Television	Crazy in Love	Nominated	
2002	Best Supporting Actress – Television	Hysterical Blindness	Nominated	

=== Screen Actors Guild Awards ===
Year	Category	Nominated work	Result	Ref.
Screen Actors Guild Awards
1996	Outstanding Performance by a Female Actor in a Leading Role	Unhook the Stars	Nominated	
2007	Outstanding Performance by a Female Actor in a Miniseries or Television Movie	What If God Were the Sun	Nominated	

=== Other Awards ===
Year	Award	Category	Nominated work	Result	Ref.
1971	New York Film Critics Circle	Best Actress	Minnie and Moskowitz	Nominated	
1974	National Board of Review	Best Actress	A Woman Under the Influence	Won	
1974	New York Film Critics Circle	Best Actress	A Woman Under the Influence	Nominated	
1974	Kansas City Film Critics Circle	Best Actress	A Woman Under the Influence	Won	
1974	San Sebastián International Film Festival	Best Actress	A Woman Under the Influence	Won	
1975	Golden Apple Awards	Female Star of the Year	—N/a	Nominated	
1978	Berlin International Film Festival	Best Actress	Opening Night	Won	
1980	Boston Society of Film Critics	Best Actress	Gloria	Won	
1984	Nastro d'Argento	Best Foreign Actress	Love Streams	Won	
1991	CableACE Awards	Actress in a Movie or Miniseries	Montana	Nominated	
1994	Sundance Film Festival	Tribute to Independent Vision Award	—N/a	Won	
1988	New York Women in Film & Television	Muse Award	—N/a	Won	
1996	Boston Film Festival	Film Excellence Award	—N/a	Won	
1996	National Board of Review	Career Achievement Award	—N/a	Won	
1999	Blockbuster Entertainment Awards	Favorite Supporting Actress – Drama/Romance	Hope Floats	Nominated	
1999	Seattle International Film Festival	Excellence for Ensemble Cast	The Weekend	Won	
2000	Satellite Awards	Best Actress in a Miniseries or a Motion Picture Made for Television	The Color of Love: Jacey's Story	Nominated	
2003	Online Film & Television Association	Best Supporting Actress in a Motion Picture or Miniseries	Hysterical Blindness	Inducted	
2004	AARP Movies for Grownups Awards	Best Actress	The Notebook	Nominated	
2004	AARP Movies for Grownups Awards	Best Grownup Love Story	The Notebook	Won	
2004	Hamptons International Film Festival	Lifetime Achievement Award	—N/a	Won	
2004	Satellite Awards	Best Actress in a Supporting Role – Drama	The Notebook	Won	
2005	Satellite Awards	Mary Pickford Award	—N/a	Won	
2005	Fangoria Chainsaw Awards	Best Supporting Actress	The Skeleton Key	Nominated	
2005	Saturn Awards	Best Supporting Actress	The Skeleton Key	Nominated	
2008	Los Angeles Greek Film Festival	Orpheus Award	—N/a	Won	
2008	Temecula Valley International Film Festival	Lifetime Achievement Award	—N/a	Won	
2014	Los Angeles Film Critics Association	Career Achievement Award	—N/a	Won	
2017	Online Film & Television Association	Film Hall of Fame: Actors	—N/a	Inducted	
