= Robin Chapman =

English novelist, playwright, and screenwriter (1933–2020)

Robin John Chapman (18 January 1933 – 29 July 2020) was an English novelist, playwright and screenwriter.

== Early life ==
Chapman was born in Croydon, Surrey. He was educated at Selhurst Grammar School (later Selhurst High School) and Christ's College, Cambridge, where he read English. He began his career as an actor at Cambridge, playing Hamlet in the ADC's centenary production and assuming the presidency of the Marlowe Society, before acting at Stratford-upon-Avon and working in repertory. He then joined Joan Littlewood's revolutionary Theatre Workshop, where he turned to writing.

== Plays and screenwriting ==
Among Chapman's stage plays are High Street China, Guests and One of Us.

He enjoyed a long career in television, favoured by Granada TV during its early days. His best-known work includes Spindoe (1968), the controversial Big Breadwinner Hog (1969), and many adaptations, including M. R. James' Lost Hearts, Jane Eyre, Eyeless in Gaza, and a considerable number of screenplays based on Roald Dahl's short stories for Tales of the Unexpected. In 1973 he scripted the six-episode BBC television drama series A Picture of Katherine Mansfield, and in 1976 he adapted two Graham Greene short stories, "Dream of a Strange Land" and "Under the Garden", for episodes of Shades of Greene presented by Thames Television. Chapman's single plays for television include Blunt: The Fourth Man (1987) and two editions of Play for Today, all three presented by BBC TV.

His television plays have won awards from the Mystery Writers of America and the Writers Guild, as well as a BAFTA nomination.

Chapman edited, with an introduction, The City and the Court, a collection of five Jacobean-era comedies.

His film screenplays include:

- Keep the Aspidistra Flying (TV movie, 1965)
- The Triple Echo (1972)
- Lost Hearts (TV movie, 1973)
- Haunted: Poor Girl (TV movie, 1974)
- Bellamira (TV movie, 1974)
- The Way of the World (TV movie, 1975)
- Force 10 from Navarone (1978)
- Caleb Williams (TV miniseries, 1980)
- The Aerodrome (TV movie, 1983)
- Killer Contract (TV movie, 1984)

== Novels ==
Chapman's published novels are:

- A Waste of Public Money (1962)
- My Vision's Enemy (1968)
- Big Breadwinner Hog (1970)
- Christoferus (1994)
- Wartimes (two novellas in one volume) (1995)
- The Secret of the World (1997)
- The Spanish Trilogy (2005)
  - The Duchess's Diary (1980)
  - Sancho's Golden Age (2004)
  - Pasamonte's Life (2005)
- Abundance (2009)
- Shakespeare's Don Quixote (2011)
- Throwing Pigeons out of Aeroplanes (2016)

The Spanish Trilogy extends the lives and experiences of characters found in Miguel de Cervantes' early 17th-century novel Don Quixote. The first book of the trilogy, The Duchess’s Diary, was positively reviewed. Noted Cervantes scholar E. C. Riley, writing a 1980 review in The Times Literary Supplement, called it "a truer understanding of Cervantes than twenty books of criticism".

Shakespeare's Don Quixote is a narrative dialogue featuring Shakespeare, John Fletcher and Cervantes, as they talk amongst themselves while watching "actors" Don Quixote and Sancho Panza performing a present-day fringe theatre production of the Shakespeare-Fletcher lost play The History of Cardenio, about Cervantes' teenaged character in Don Quixote.
