= Janet Jones (artist) =

Canadian artist

- Born: 1952 (age 73–74); Montreal, Quebec, Canada
- Died: 2025
- Education: Sir George Williams University, University of Toronto, York University, New York University
- Known for: painter
- Movement: Modernism
- Spouse: James Gillespie
- Website: www.katzmancontemporary.com/janetjones/

Janet Jones was a Canadian artist, art historian and associate professor at York University in Toronto, Ontario.

She was known for her hard-edge abstract painting which draws from technological culture, film history and urban space. Jones merges imagery inspired by sterile public spaces like the lobbies of multinational corporations or hyper-lit passages on the Las Vegas casino strip.

Her 2010 solo exhibition, DaDa Delirium at the MacLaren Art Centre in Barrie, Ontario, showed large abstract paintings made between 2003 and 2010. It was enthusiastically reviewed by Yvonne Lammerich in Canadian Art.

Her Ph.D. thesis was "Clement Greenberg and the Artist/Critic Relationship", which focused on Greenbergian modernist criticism in relation to painting and the internal structure of the 'Greenberg Group'.

In 2002 she received the Faculty of Fine Arts Dean's Teaching Award for outstanding teaching and contribution to the life and vibrancy of the Faculty of Fine Arts.
