= List of awards and nominations received by Michelle Pfeiffer =

Michelle Pfeiffer
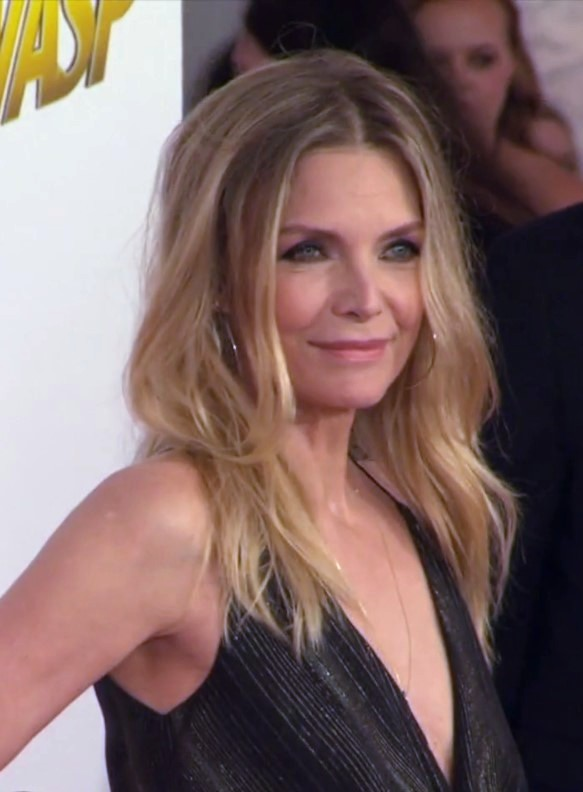
- Pfeiffer in 2018
Awards and nominations
Award	Wins	Nominations
Actor Awards	0	2
Academy Awards	0	3
British Academy Film Awards	1	2
Primetime Emmy Awards	0	2
Golden Globe Awards	1	8

Totals (Note: Certain award groups do not simply award one winner. They acknowledge several different recipients, have runners-up, and have third place. Since this is a specific recognition and is different from losing an award, runner-up mentions are considered wins in this award tally. For simplification and to avoid errors, each award in this list has been presumed to have had a prior nomination.)
- Wins: 13
- Nominations: 38

This article is a List of awards and nominations received by Michelle Pfeiffer

Michelle Pfeiffer is an American actress known for her leading roles in film and television. She has received several awards and nominations throughout her career including a British Academy Film Award, a Golden Globe Award as well as prizes from the Berlin Film Festival and Venice Film Festival. She has also received nominations for three Academy Awards, a Primetime Emmy Award, and two Actor Awards.

For her performances in film, Pfeiffer received three Academy Award nominations, her first for Best Supporting Actress for her portrayal of Madame de Tourvel in the costume drama Dangerous Liaisons (1988), and the next two for Best Actress for her roles as Susie Diamond in the drama The Fabulous Baker Boys (1989), and a Dallas housewife in the drama Love Field (1992). She won the BAFTA Award for Best Actress in a Supporting Role for Dangerous Liaisons (1988). She won the Golden Globe Award for Best Actress in a Motion Picture – Drama for The Fabulous Baker Boys (1989).

She was further Globe-nominated for playing a gangster's widow in the crime comedy Married to the Mob (1988), a young Soviet woman in the spy film The Russia House (1990), a waitress in love in the romantic comedy Frankie and Johnny (1991), a housewife in Love Field, Countess Olenska in the period romance The Age of Innocence (1993), and a Manhattan heiress in the comedy-drama French Exit (2020). She received two Actor Awards nominations for Outstanding Supporting Actress for playing a self-centered mother in the drama White Oleander (2002). She was also nominated along with the ensemble for Outstanding Cast in a Motion Picture for the musical Hairspray where she played the racist manager of a TV station.

She received the Berlin Film Festival's Silver Bear for Best Actress for Love Field (1992) and the Venice Film Festival's Elvira Notari Prize for The Age of Innocence (1993). Additionally, she has been awarded by a various of film critics associations including, Best Actress awards from the National Board of Review, the National Society of Film Critics, the New York Film Critics Circle, the Chicago Film Critics Association and the Los Angeles Film Critics Association, as well as Best Supporting Actress awards from the Kansas City Film Critics Circle and the San Diego Film Critics Society.

In 2017, Pfeiffer received her first Primetime Emmy Award nomination for her portrayal of Ruth Madoff in the HBO television film The Wizard of Lies (2017). That same year, it was announced that she had also received a Golden Globe Award for Best Supporting Actress – Series, Miniseries or Television Film nomination for the role. She received a Critics' Choice Television Award for Best Actress in a Limited Series or Television Movie nomination for her portrayal of First Lady Betty Ford in the Showtime anthology series The First Lady (2023).

== Major associations ==
=== Academy Awards ===
Year	Category	Nominated work	Result	Winner	Ref.
1989	Best Supporting Actress	Dangerous Liaisons	Nominated	Geena Davis, The Accidental Tourist	
1990	Best Actress	The Fabulous Baker Boys	Nominated	Jessica Tandy, Driving Miss Daisy	
1993	Best Actress	Love Field	Nominated	Emma Thompson, Howards End	

=== Actor Awards ===
Year	Category	Nominated work	Result	Ref.
2003	Outstanding Actress in a Supporting Role	White Oleander	Nominated	
2008	Outstanding Cast in a Motion Picture	Hairspray	Nominated	

=== BAFTA Awards ===
Year	Category	Nominated work	Result	Ref.
British Academy Film Awards
1990	Best Actress in a Supporting Role	Dangerous Liaisons	Won	
1991	Best Actress in a Leading Role	The Fabulous Baker Boys	Nominated	

=== Emmy Awards ===
Year	Category	Nominated work	Result	Ref.
Primetime Emmy Awards
2017	Outstanding Supporting Actress in a Limited Series or Movie	The Wizard of Lies	Nominated	
2026	Outstanding Supporting Actress in a Comedy Series	Margo's Got Money Troubles	Nominated	
2026	Outstanding Comedy Series	Margo's Got Money Troubles	Nominated	

=== Golden Globe Awards ===
Year	Category	Nominated work	Result	Ref.
1989	Best Actress in a Motion Picture – Musical or Comedy	Married to the Mob	Nominated	
1990	Best Actress in a Motion Picture – Drama	The Fabulous Baker Boys	Won	
1991	Best Actress in a Motion Picture – Drama	The Russia House	Nominated	
1992	Best Actress in a Motion Picture – Musical or Comedy	Frankie and Johnny	Nominated	
1993	Best Actress in a Motion Picture – Drama	Love Field	Nominated	
1994	Best Actress in a Motion Picture – Drama	The Age of Innocence	Nominated	
2018	Best Supporting Actress – Television	The Wizard of Lies	Nominated	
2021	Best Actress in a Motion Picture – Musical or Comedy	French Exit	Nominated	

== Critics awards ==
Organizations	Year	Category	Work	Result	Ref.
Critics' Choice Awards	2023	Best Actress in a Limited Series or Television Movie	The First Lady	Nominated	
Chicago Film Critics Association Awards	1989	Best Actress	The Fabulous Baker Boys	Won	
Hollywood Critics Association TV Awards	2022	Best Actress in a Limited or Anthology Series	The First Lady	Nominated	
Kansas City Film Critics Circle Awards	2003	Best Supporting Actress	White Oleander	Won	
Los Angeles Film Critics Association Awards	1989	Best Actress	The Fabulous Baker Boys	Won	
National Board of Review Awards	1989	Best Actress	The Fabulous Baker Boys	Won	
National Society of Film Critics Awards	1989	Best Actress	The Fabulous Baker Boys	Won	
New York Film Critics Circle Awards	1989	Best Actress	The Fabulous Baker Boys	Won	
San Diego Film Critics Society Awards	2002	Best Supporting Actress	White Oleander	Won	

== Miscellaneous awards ==
Organizations	Year	Category	Work	Result	Ref.
Berlin International Film Festival	1992	Silver Bear for Best Actress	Love Field	Won	
Blockbuster Entertainment Awards	1996	Favorite Actress – Drama	Dangerous Minds	Won	
Blockbuster Entertainment Awards	1997	Favorite Actress – Comedy/Romance	One Fine Day	Won	
Blockbuster Entertainment Awards	2001	Favorite Actress – Suspense	What Lies Beneath	Won	
Canadian Screen Award	2021	Best Actress	French Exit	Won	
MTV Movie Awards	1993	Best Kiss	Batman Returns (with Michael Keaton)	Nominated	
MTV Movie Awards	1993	Most Desirable Female	Batman Returns	Nominated	
MTV Movie Awards	1996	Most Desirable Female	Dangerous Minds	Nominated	
MTV Movie Awards	1996	Best Female Performance	Dangerous Minds	Nominated	
Saturn Awards	1986	Best Actress	Ladyhawke	Nominated	
Saturn Awards	1995	Best Actress	Wolf	Nominated	
Saturn Awards	2001	Best Actress	What Lies Beneath	Nominated	
Saturn Awards	2008	Best Supporting Actress	Stardust	Nominated	
Venice International Film Festival	1993	Elvira Notari prize	The Age of Innocence	Won	

== Honorary awards ==
Organizations	Year	Award	Result	Ref.
Hollywood Walk of Fame	2007	Star on the Walk of Fame	Honored	
Grauman's Chinese Theatre	2025	Handprint ceremonies	Honored	
Gotham TV Awards	2026	Legend Tribute	Honored	
IndieWire Honors	2026	Vanguard Award	Honored	
