= List of Michelle Pfeiffer performances =

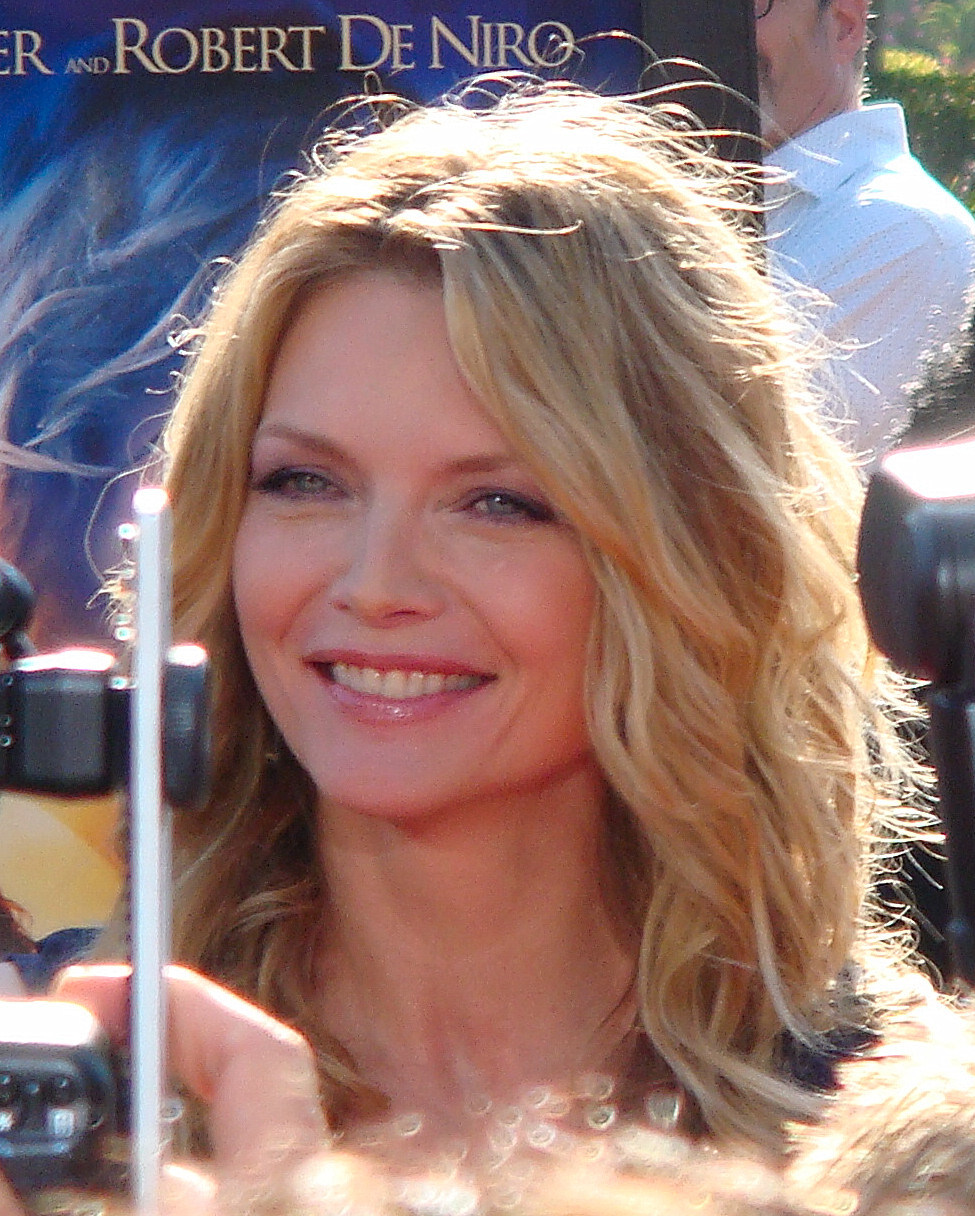
Pfeiffer in 2007

Michelle Pfeiffer is an American actress and producer. She has received three Academy Award nominations: Best Supporting Actress for Dangerous Liaisons (1988), and Best Actress for The Fabulous Baker Boys (1989) and Love Field (1992).

== Filmography ==
Key
†	Denotes works that have not yet been released

=== Film ===
Year	Title	Role	Director	Notes	Ref.
1980	The Hollywood Knights	Suzie Q	Floyd Mutrux	Film debut	
1980	Falling in Love Again	Sue Wellington	Steven Paul		
1981	Charlie Chan and the Curse of the Dragon Queen	Cordelia Farenington	Clive Donner		
1982	Grease 2	Stephanie Zinone	Patricia Birch		
1983	Scarface	Elvira Hancock	Brian De Palma		
1985	Into the Night	Diana	John Landis		
1985	Ladyhawke	Isabeau d'Anjou	Richard Donner		
1986	Sweet Liberty	Faith Healy	Alan Alda		
1987	The Witches of Eastwick	Sukie Ridgemont	George Miller		
1987	Amazon Women on the Moon	Brenda Landers	John Landis	Segment: "Hospital"	
1988	Married to the Mob	Angela de Marco	Jonathan Demme		
1988	Tequila Sunrise	Jo Ann Vallenari	Robert Towne		
1988	Dangerous Liaisons	Madame Marie de Tourvel	Stephen Frears		
1989	The Fabulous Baker Boys	Susie Diamond	Steve Kloves		
1990	The Russia House	Katya Orlova	Fred Schepisi		
1991	Frankie and Johnny	Frankie	Garry Marshall		
1992	Batman Returns	Selina Kyle / Catwoman	Tim Burton		
1992	Love Field	Lurene Hallett	Jonathan Kaplan		
1993	The Age of Innocence	Countess Ellen Olenska	Martin Scorsese		
1994	Wolf	Laura Alden	Mike Nichols		
1995	Dangerous Minds	LouAnne Johnson	John N. Smith		
1996	Up Close & Personal	Sally "Tally" Atwater	Jon Avnet		
1996	To Gillian on Her 37th Birthday	Gillian Lewis	Michael Pressman		
1996	One Fine Day	Melanie Parker	Michael Hoffman		
1997	A Thousand Acres	Rose Cook Lewis	Jocelyn Moorhouse		
1998	The Prince of Egypt	Tzipporah	Brenda Chapman, Steve Hickner & Simon Wells	Voice	
1999	The Deep End of the Ocean	Beth Cappadora	Ulu Grosbard		
1999	A Midsummer Night's Dream	Titania	Michael Hoffman		
1999	The Story of Us	Katie Jordan	Rob Reiner		
2000	What Lies Beneath	Claire Spencer	Robert Zemeckis		
2001	I Am Sam	Rita Harrison Williams	Jessie Nelson		
2002	White Oleander	Ingrid Magnussen	Peter Kosminsky		
2003	Sinbad: Legend of the Seven Seas	Eris	Tim Johnson & Patrick Gilmore	Voice	
2007	I Could Never Be Your Woman	Rosie Hanson	Amy Heckerling		
2007	Hairspray	Velma Von Tussle	Adam Shankman		
2007	Stardust	Lamia	Matthew Vaughn		
2008	Personal Effects	Linda	David Hollander		
2009	Chéri	Lea de Lonval	Stephen Frears		
2011	New Year's Eve	Ingrid Withers	Garry Marshall		
2012	Dark Shadows	Elizabeth Collins Stoddard	Tim Burton		
2012	People Like Us	Lillian Harper	Alex Kurtzman		
2013	The Family	Maggie Blake	Luc Besson		
2017	Where Is Kyra?	Kyra Johnson	Andrew Dosunmu		
2017	Mother!	Woman	Darren Aronofsky		
2017	Murder on the Orient Express	Caroline Hubbard	Kenneth Branagh		
2018	Ant-Man and the Wasp	Janet Van Dyne / Wasp	Peyton Reed		
2019	Avengers: Endgame	Janet Van Dyne / Wasp	Anthony and Joe Russo		
2019	Maleficent: Mistress of Evil	Queen Ingrith	Joachim Rønning		
2020	French Exit	Frances Price	Azazel Jacobs		
2023	Ant-Man and the Wasp: Quantumania	Janet Van Dyne / Wasp	Peyton Reed		
2025	Oh. What. Fun.	Claire Clauster	Michael Showalter		

=== Television ===
Year	Title	Role	Notes	Ref.
1978	Fantasy Island	Athena	Episode: "The Island of Lost Women/The Flight of Great Yellow Bird"	
1979	Delta House	The Bombshell	12 episodes	
1979	The Solitary Man	Tricia	Television film	
1979	CHiPs	Jobina	Episode: "The Watch Commander"	
1980	B.A.D. Cats	Samantha "Sunshine" Jensen	10 episodes	
1980	Enos	Joy	2 episodes	
1981	Fantasy Island	Deborah Dare	Episode: "Elizabeth's Baby/The Artist and the Lady"	
1981	Callie & Son	Sue Lynn Bordeaux	Television film; Credited as "Michele Pfeiffer"	
1981	Splendor in the Grass	Ginny Stamper	Television film	
1981	The Children Nobody Wanted	Jennifer Williams	Television film	
1985	One Too Many	Annie	Television special	
1987	Great Performances	Natica Jackson	Episode: "Tales from the Hollywood Hills: Natica Jackson"	
1993–1994	The Simpsons	Mindy Simmons	Voice; 2 episodes	
1995	Picket Fences	Client	Uncredited; Episode: "Freezer Burn"	
1996	Muppets Tonight	Herself	Episode: "Michelle Pfeiffer"	
2017	The Wizard of Lies	Ruth Madoff	Television film	
2022	The First Lady	Betty Ford	Lead role; 10 episodes	
2023	Marvel Studios: Assembled	Herself	Episode: "The Making of Ant-Man and the Wasp: Quantumania"	
2026–present	The Madison	Stacy Clyburn	Lead role; executive producer	
2026–present	Margo's Got Money Troubles	Shyanne Millet	Main role; also executive producer	

=== Music videos ===
Year	Title	Artist	Role	Ref.
1995	"Gangsta's Paradise"	Coolio	LouAnne Johnson	

== Soundtrack discography ==
- Grease 2: Original Soundtrack Recording from Grease 2 (1982) as Stephanie Zinone
- The Prince of Egypt (Music From The Original Motion Picture Soundtrack) (1998) as Zipporah
- Hairspray: Soundtrack to the Motion Picture from Hairspray (2007) as Velma Von Tussle
- Murder on the Orient Express (Original Motion Picture Soundtrack) from Murder on the Orient Express (2017) as herself

== Accolades and honors ==
Pfeiffer has received several accolades, including three Academy Award nominations:

- 61st Academy Awards (1988): Best Supporting Actress for Dangerous Liaisons (Note: Pfeiffer won the BAFTA Award in the same category.)
- 62nd Academy Awards (1989): Best Actress for The Fabulous Baker Boys (Note: Pfeiffer won the Golden Globe Award in the same category.)
- 65th Academy Awards (1992): Best Actress for Love Field

Additionally, she has been nominated for a total of eight Golden Globe Awards, as well as two Screen Actors Guild Awards and a Primetime Emmy Award.
