= Michelle Pfeiffer =

American actress (born 1958)

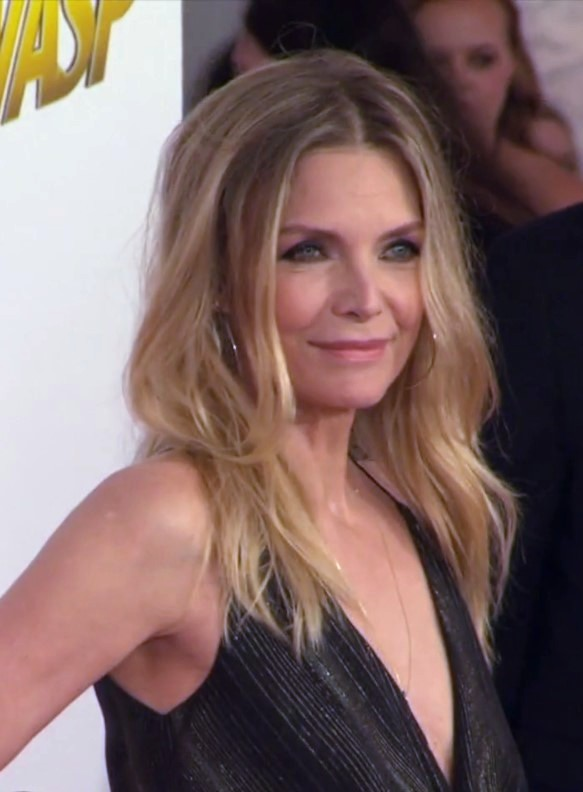
- Pfeiffer in 2018
- Born: Michelle Marie Pfeiffer; April 29, 1958 (age 68); Santa Ana, California, U.S.
- Occupations: Actress; producer
- Years active: 1977–present
- Works: Full list
- Spouses: Peter Horton (m. 1981; div. 1988); David E. Kelley (m. 1993)
- Children: 2
- Relatives: Dedee Pfeiffer (sister)
- Awards: Full list

Michelle Marie Pfeiffer (/ˈfaɪfər/ FY-fər; born April 29, 1958) is an American actress and producer. One of Hollywood's most bankable stars of the 1980s and 1990s, her work has earned her numerous accolades, including a BAFTA Award and a Golden Globe, in addition to nominations for three Academy Awards and three Primetime Emmy Awards.

Pfeiffer began her career in the late 1970s with minor television and film appearances. After landing her first leading role in Grease 2 (1982), her breakthrough came with her portrayal of Elvira Hancock in Scarface (1983). Mainstream success followed with The Witches of Eastwick (1987), Tequila Sunrise (1988), and Married to the Mob (1988); her performance in the latter earned Pfeiffer her first of six consecutive Golden Globe nominations. She earned consecutive Academy Award nominations, Best Supporting Actress for Dangerous Liaisons (1988) and Best Actress for The Fabulous Baker Boys (1989), winning a Golden Globe for the latter.

By the early 1990s, Pfeiffer was one of the world's highest-paid actresses. She played Catwoman in Batman Returns (1992) and received her third Academy Award nomination for Love Field (1992). She continued to star in prominent films throughout the decade, including Frankie & Johnny (1991), The Age of Innocence (1993), and Wolf (1994). Through her production company, Via Rosa Productions, she produced and starred in several films, including Dangerous Minds (1995). In the 2000s, Pfeiffer reduced her workload to focus on her family, appearing in select projects such as What Lies Beneath (2000), White Oleander (2002), Hairspray, and Stardust (both 2007).

Following a hiatus, Pfeiffer returned to prominence in 2017 with roles in Where Is Kyra?, Mother!, and Murder on the Orient Express. That same year, she received her first Primetime Emmy Award nomination for the television film The Wizard of Lies, followed by her eighth Golden Globe nomination for French Exit in 2020. Since Ant-Man and the Wasp (2018), Pfeiffer has played Janet van Dyne in the Marvel Cinematic Universe. As of 2026, she stars as family matriarchs in the streaming television series The Madison and Margo's Got Money Troubles; her work as both an actress and producer on the latter earned her two Primetime Emmy Award nominations.

== Early life ==
Michelle Marie Pfeiffer was born on April 29, 1958, in Santa Ana, California, to Richard Pfeiffer, an air-conditioning contractor, and Donna Jean (née Taverna), a housewife. She has an older brother and two younger sisters, including Dedee. Her parents were both originally from North Dakota. Her paternal grandfather was of German ancestry, and her paternal grandmother was of English, Welsh, French, Irish, and Dutch descent, while her maternal grandfather was of Swiss German and Swiss Italian descent and her maternal grandmother of Swedish ancestry. The family moved to Midway City, another Orange County community around seven miles (11 km) away, where Pfeiffer spent her early years.

Pfeiffer attended Fountain Valley High School, graduating in 1976. She worked as a cashier at a Vons supermarket and attended Golden West College, where she was a member of the Alpha Delta Pi sorority. After a short stint training to be a court stenographer, she pursued an acting career. Pfeiffer won the Miss Orange County beauty pageant in 1978 and finished sixth in the Miss California contest the same year. After her appearances in these pageants, she acquired an agent and began to audition for television and film roles. She recalled that her first agents urged her to change her surname, believing it would be too difficult for audiences to spell or pronounce, but she refused.

== Career ==
=== 1970s and 1980s ===
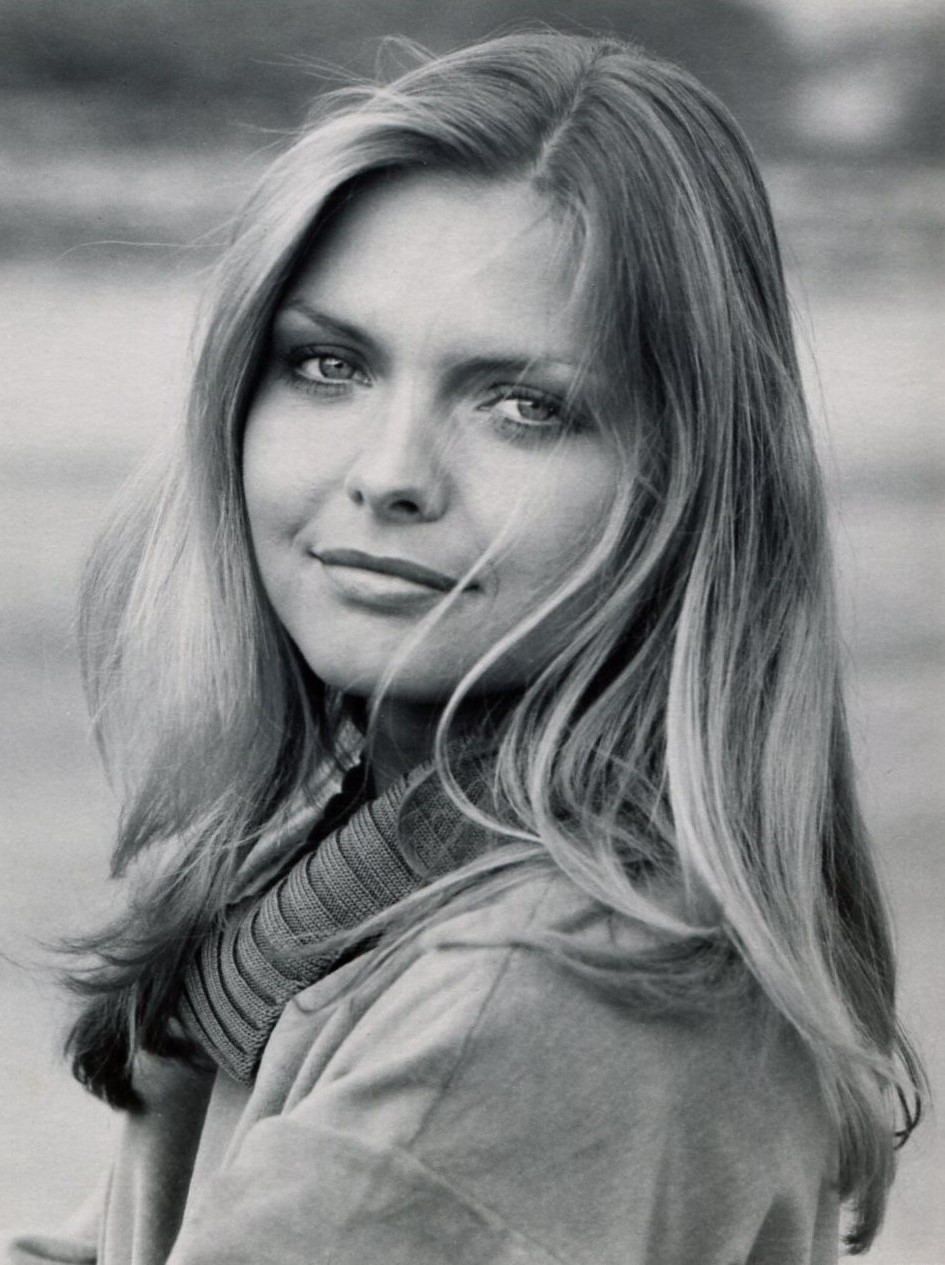
Pfeiffer in 1979

Pfeiffer made her acting debut in 1978, in a one-episode appearance on Fantasy Island. Other roles in television series followed, including Delta House, CHiPs, Enos, and B.A.D. Cats. She transitioned to film with the comedy The Hollywood Knights (1980), alongside Tony Danza, appearing as high school sweethearts. She subsequently played supporting roles in Falling in Love Again (1980) and Charlie Chan and the Curse of the Dragon Queen (1981), neither of which met with much critical or box office success. She appeared in a television commercial for Lux soap and took acting lessons at the Beverly Hills Playhouse, before appearing in three 1981 television movies—Callie and Son, with Lindsay Wagner, The Children Nobody Wanted, and Splendor in the Grass.

Pfeiffer obtained her first starring film role as the female lead in Grease 2 (1982), the sequel to the 1978 smash-hit musical film Grease. With only a few television roles and small film appearances, the 23-year-old Pfeiffer was an unknown actress when she attended the casting call audition for the role, but according to director Patricia Birch, she won the part because she "has a quirky quality you don't expect". The film was a critical and commercial failure, but Pfeiffer's performance was noted as a standout. The New York Times remarked: "[A]lthough she is a relative screen newcomer, Miss Pfeiffer manages to look much more insouciant and comfortable than anyone else in the cast." Her agent later admitted that her association with the film meant that "she couldn't get any jobs. Nobody wanted to hire her." On her early screen roles, Pfeiffer stated: "I needed to learn how to act ... in the meantime, I was playing bimbos and cashing in on my looks."

The director Brian De Palma, having seen Grease 2, refused to audition Pfeiffer for Scarface (1983) but relented at the insistence of Martin Bregman, the film's producer. She was cast as the cocaine-addicted trophy wife Elvira Hancock. The film was considered excessively violent by most critics but became a commercial hit and gained a large cult following in subsequent years. Pfeiffer received positive reviews for her supporting role: Richard Corliss of Time magazine wrote, "most of the large cast is fine: Michelle Pfeiffer is better ...", while Dominick Dunne, in an article for Vanity Fair titled "Blonde Ambition", wrote, "[s]he is on the verge of stardom. In the parlance of the industry, she is hot."

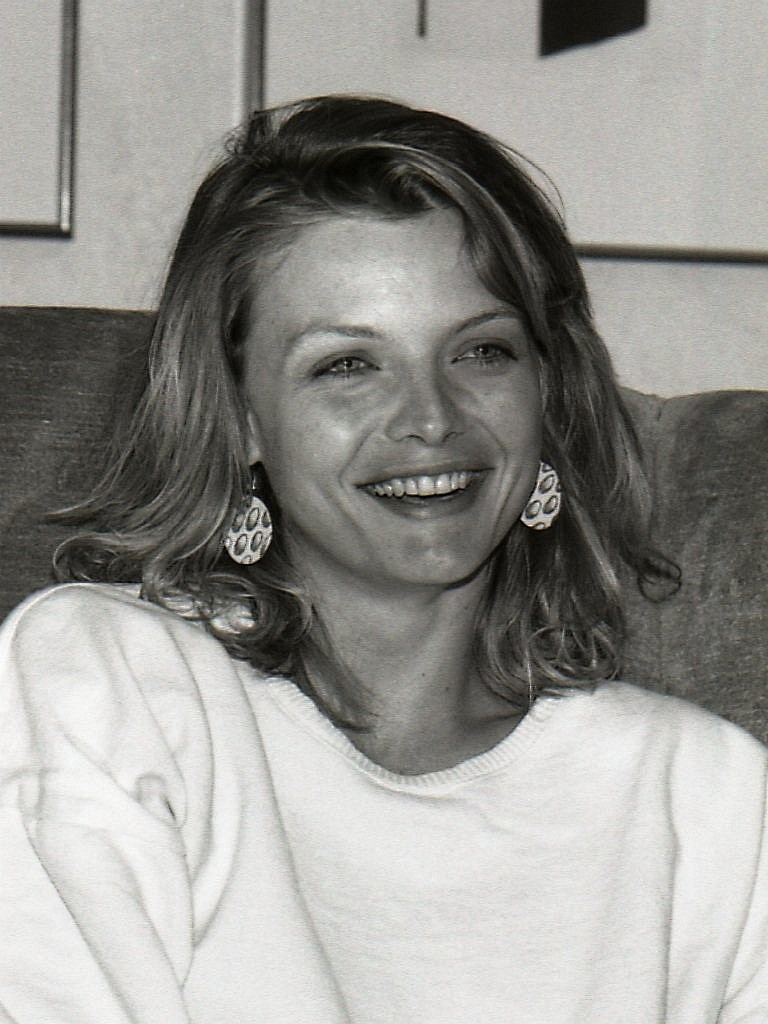
Pfeiffer in 1985

Following Scarface, Pfeiffer played Diana in John Landis' comedy Into the Night (1985), Isabeau d'Anjou in Richard Donner's fantasy film Ladyhawke (1985), Faith Healy in Alan Alda's Sweet Liberty (1986), and Brenda Landers in a segment of the 1950s sci-fi parody Amazon Women on the Moon (1987), all of which, despite achieving only modest commercial success, helped to establish her as an actress. She finally scored a major box-office hit as Sukie Ridgemont in the 1987 adaptation of John Updike's novel The Witches of Eastwick, with Jack Nicholson, Cher, and Susan Sarandon. The film received positive reviews and grossed over $63.7 million domestically, equivalent to $181 million in 2025 dollars, becoming one of her earliest critical and commercial successes. Praising their comic timing, Roger Ebert wrote that Pfeiffer and her female co-stars each "have a delicious good time with their roles", while the Los Angeles Times film critic Sheila Benson said Pfeiffer makes her role "a warm, irresistible character".

Pfeiffer was cast against type as a murdered gangster's widow in Jonathan Demme's mafia comedy Married to the Mob (1988), her first star vehicle. For the role of Angela de Marco, she donned a curly brunette wig and a Brooklyn accent, and she received her first Golden Globe Award nomination as Best Actress in a Motion Picture Musical or Comedy, beginning a six-year streak of consecutive Best Actress nominations at the Golden Globes. Pfeiffer starred as the restaurateur Jo Ann Vallenari in Tequila Sunrise (1988) but experienced creative and personal differences with director Robert Towne, who later described her as the "most difficult" actress he had worked with. She attributed her negative experience making the film to minor injuries sustained from a poorly constructed hot tub and high staff turnover, to the point that she said she had asked to be fired from the production.

At Demme's personal recommendation, Pfeiffer joined the cast of Stephen Frears's Dangerous Liaisons (1988), playing Madame Marie de Tourvel, a virtuous victim of seduction. Hal Hinson of The Washington Post saw her role as "the least obvious and the most difficult. Nothing is harder to play than virtue, and Pfeiffer is smart enough not to try. Instead, she embodies it. Her porcelain-skinned beauty, in this regard, is a great asset, and the way it's used makes it seem an aspect of her spirituality." For this appearance, she won the BAFTA Award for Best Actress in a Supporting Role and received a nomination for the Academy Award for Best Supporting Actress.

Pfeiffer then accepted the role of Susie Diamond, a hard-edged former call girl turned lounge singer, in The Fabulous Baker Boys (1989), which also starred Jeff Bridges and Beau Bridges as the eponymous Baker Boys. She underwent intense voice training for the role for four months and performed all of her character's vocals. The film was a modest success, grossing $18.4 million in the US and Canada (equivalent to $48 million in 2025 dollars). Her portrayal of Susie, however, drew unanimous acclaim from reviewers. Critic Roger Ebert compared her to Rita Hayworth in Gilda and to Marilyn Monroe in Some Like It Hot, adding that the film was "one of the movies they will use as a document, years from now, when they begin to trace the steps by which Pfeiffer became a great star". During the 1989–1990 awards season, Pfeiffer won as Best Actress at the Golden Globes, the National Board of Review, the National Society of Film Critics, the New York Film Critics Circle, the Los Angeles Film Critics Association, and the Chicago Film Critics Association. Her performance as Susie is considered to be the most critically acclaimed of her career. The scene in which her character seductively performs "Makin' Whoopee" atop a grand piano has been cited by film historians as one of the most memorable scenes in cinema history.

=== 1990s ===
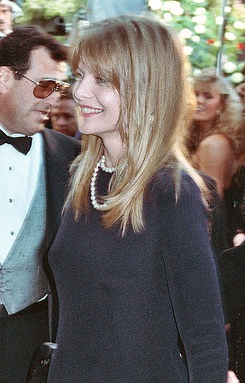
Pfeiffer at the 63rd Academy Awards in 1990

In 1990, Pfeiffer formed her own film production company, Via Rosa Productions, with business partner Kate Guinzburg, whom she had met on the set of Sweet Liberty (1986). The company was under a picture deal with Touchstone Pictures, a film label of Walt Disney Studios. That year, Pfeiffer began earning $1 million per film and took on the part of the Soviet book editor Katya Orlova in the film adaptation of John le Carré's The Russia House, a role that required her to adopt a Russian accent. For her efforts, she was rewarded with a Golden Globe Award for Best Actress in a Motion Picture – Drama. Pfeiffer then landed the role of the waitress Frankie in Garry Marshall's Frankie and Johnny (1991), a film adaptation of Terrence McNally's Broadway play Frankie and Johnny in the Clair de Lune, which reunited her with her Scarface co-star Al Pacino. The casting was seen as controversial by many, as Pfeiffer was considered far too beautiful to play an "ordinary" waitress. Kathy Bates, the original Frankie on Broadway, also expressed disappointment over the producers' choice. Pfeiffer herself stated that she took the role because it "wasn't what people would expect of [her]". She was once again nominated for a Golden Globe Award for Best Actress in a Motion Picture – Drama for her performance.

Pfeiffer took on the role of Selina Kyle–Catwoman in Tim Burton's superhero film Batman Returns (1992), after Annette Bening dropped out due to pregnancy. For the role, she trained in kickboxing. Pfeiffer received unanimous critical acclaim for her portrayal, which was subsequently referred to as the greatest performance of Catwoman of all time by critics and fans. Premiere retrospectively stated: "Arguably the outstanding villain of the Tim Burton era, Michelle Pfeiffer's deadly kitten with a whip brought sex to the normally neutered franchise. Her stitched-together, black patent leather costume, based on a sketch of Burton's, remains the character's most iconic look. And Michelle Pfeiffer overcomes Batman Returns' heavy-handed feminist dialogue to deliver a growling, fierce performance."

The first film Pfeiffer's company produced was the independent drama Love Field (1992), in which she starred. Reviewers embraced it, and The New York Times stated that Pfeiffer was "again demonstrating that she is as subtle and surprising as she is beautiful". For her portrayal of an eccentric Dallas, Texas housewife, she earned nominations for the Academy Award for Best Actress and the Golden Globe for Best Actress – Drama and won the Silver Bear for Best Actress at the 43rd Berlin International Film Festival. In Martin Scorsese's period drama The Age of Innocence (1993), a film adaptation of Edith Wharton's 1920 novel, Pfeiffer portrayed a countess in upper-class New York City in the 1870s. For her role, she received the Elvira Notari Prize at the Venice Film Festival and a Golden Globe nomination for Best Actress – Motion Picture. That year, she was awarded the Women in Film Los Angeles' Crystal Award.

Pfeiffer starred with Jack Nicholson in the 1994 horror film Wolf, portraying the female interest of a writer who becomes a werewolf at night after being bitten by a creature. The New York Times wrote: "Ms. Pfeiffer's role is underwritten, but her performance is expert enough to make even diffidence compelling." Pfeiffer's next role was as educator and former Marine LouAnne Johnson in the drama Dangerous Minds (1995), which she co-produced via her company. Based on Johnson's 1992 autobiography My Posse Don't Do Homework, Pfeiffer played a teacher who uses unconventional methods to connect with students at an underfunded high school. She became pregnant during filming, which she concealed using costumes and props. Despite negative reviews, Dangerous Minds was a major box-office success, grossing $179.5 million against a production budget of $29 million, and cementing Pfeiffer as a box office draw. Some critics considered her performance a standout despite the film's poor reception; Kenneth Turan of the Los Angeles Times called her "as believable as the film allows her to be" in an "otherwise simplistic and predictable" film.

In 1996, Pfeiffer starred in the romantic drama Up Close & Personal, in which she portrayed an aspiring news anchor who develops a romantic relationship with her mentor, a veteran news anchor played by Robert Redford. Aided by the bankability of Pfeiffer and Redford, the film was a commercial success, but received mostly negative reviews, with critical consensus stating that it wastes the talents of its leads. To Gillian on Her 37th Birthday, based on Michael Brady's 1984 play and adapted for the screen by Pfeiffer's husband, David E. Kelley, was also poorly received. Pfeiffer starred in and executive produced One Fine Day, a romantic comedy in which two divorced single parents are brought together by a series of mishaps as they care for their children over the course of a chaotic day in New York City. George Clooney co-starred as her love interest, in his first leading role in a major studio film. The film underperformed both critically and commercially, but Pfeiffer and Clooney's chemistry was complimented by critics. In The New York Times, Janet Maslin said Pfeiffer "can seem as substantial as she is gorgeous even in silly roles" and demonstrates "a flair for physical comedy".

Subsequent performances included Rose Cook Lewis in the film adaptation of Jane Smiley's Pulitzer Prize-winning novel A Thousand Acres (1997); Beth Cappadora in The Deep End of the Ocean (1998); Titania, the Queen of the Fairies, in A Midsummer Night's Dream (1999); and Katie Jordan in Rob Reiner's comedy drama The Story of Us (1999). A Thousand Acres and The Deep End of the Ocean were produced by Via Rosa Productions. Pfeiffer voiced Tzipporah, a shepherdess who becomes the wife of Moses, in DreamWorks Animation's The Prince of Egypt (1998), a musical adaptation based on the Book of Exodus. She also recorded the film's theme song, "When You Believe".

=== 2000s ===
Pfeiffer began to dissolve her film production company, Via Rosa Productions, in 1999, and moved into semi-retirement to spend more quality time with her children and family. One of the company's final productions before disbanding was Original Sin (2001), an adaptation of Cornell Woolrich's 1947 novel Waltz into Darkness, starring Angelina Jolie.

As the 2000s began, journalists noted a shift in Pfeiffer's career as she increasingly played mothers and wives. In Robert Zemeckis's thriller What Lies Beneath (2000), Pfeiffer starred opposite Harrison Ford as one-half of a couple who discovers that their lakeside house is haunted. The film marked Pfeiffer's first horror role, and she commanded a salary of $10 million. Pfeiffer's severe fear of water led the studio to hire a scuba diver to help her prepare for the film's several underwater scenes. Her performance was praised by critics. What Lies Beneath was a commercial success despite mixed reviews, becoming Pfeiffer's biggest hit since Batman Returns (1992), and helping reverse a string of recent box-office disappointments. In 2001's I Am Sam, Pfeiffer played a lawyer helping a father with a developmental disability, portrayed by Sean Penn, fight for custody of his daughter. For research, she visited a Los Angeles center serving people with developmental disabilities. Despite performing well at the box office and earning Penn an Academy Award nomination, the film received unfavorable reviews; critics found Pfeiffer's performance hindered by a stereotypical, underdeveloped character, with some describing her portrayal as out of place within the film's tone. Sean Axmaker of the Seattle Post-Intelligencer said she "delivers her flattest, phoniest performance ever".

Pfeiffer took on the role of a murderous artist in the drama White Oleander (2002). Stephen Holden of The New York Times wrote that "Ms. Pfeiffer, giving the most complex screen performance of her career, makes her Olympian seductress at once irresistible and diabolical." Kenneth Turan of the Los Angeles Times described her as "incandescent", bringing "power and unshakable will to her role as mother-master manipulator" in a "riveting, impeccable performance". Pfeiffer won Best Supporting Actress Awards from the San Diego Film Critics Society and the Kansas City Film Critics Circle, as well as a Screen Actors Guild Award nomination. In 2003, Pfeiffer lent her voice to the character of goddess of chaos Eris in Sinbad: Legend of the Seven Seas, an animated film. Following the film's release, she took a four-year hiatus from acting, during which she remained largely out of the public eye to devote time to her husband and children.

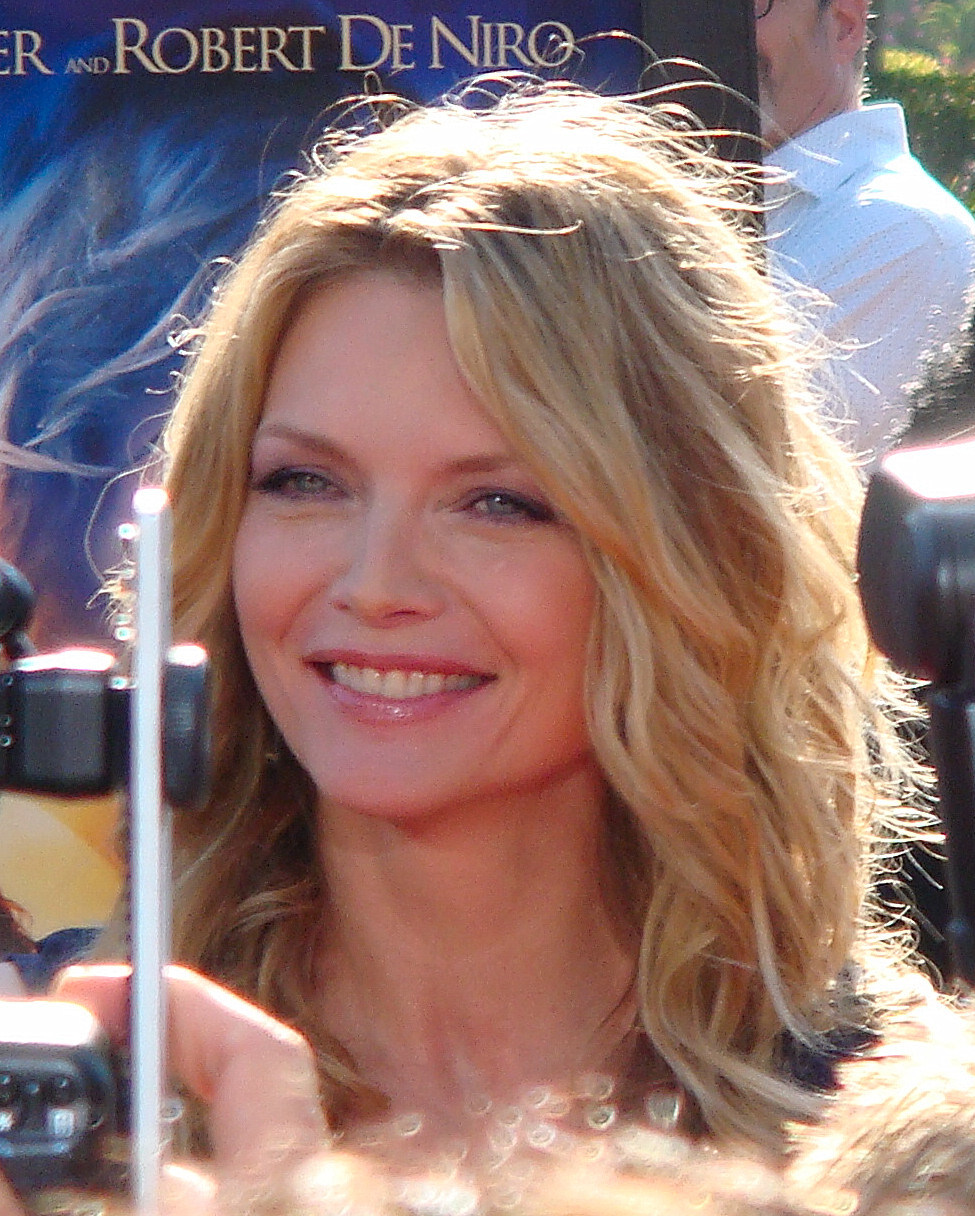
Pfeiffer at the premiere of Stardust in 2007

Pfeiffer returned to cinemas in 2007 with villainous roles in the summer blockbusters Hairspray and Stardust, which the media hailed as a successful comeback. In the former, a film adaptation of the Broadway musical of the same name, she portrayed the racist station manager Velma Von Tussle. Pfeiffer described Velma as the most difficult role she had played at the time due to the character's bigotry. Her performance received critical acclaim. As part of the cast, she received nominations for the Screen Actors Guild Award for Outstanding Performance by a Cast in a Motion Picture and shared wins for the Broadcast Film Critics Association Award for Best Acting Ensemble, the Hollywood Film Festival Award for Ensemble of the Year, and the Palm Springs International Film Festival Award for Ensemble Cast. In the fantasy adventure Stardust, Pfeiffer played Lamia, an ancient witch who hunts a fallen star in search of eternal youth. She wore extensive prosthetic makeup to portray the character as she alternately ages and de-ages throughout the film. The New York Times critic Stephen Holden called Pfeiffer "as deliciously evil a witch as the movies have ever invented".

Pfeiffer starred in Amy Heckerling's romantic comedy I Could Never Be Your Woman (2007), portraying Rosie, a 40-year-old divorced television producer who falls in love with a much younger actor (Paul Rudd) cast in her show. Production and distribution were beleaguered by financial disputes, including disagreements over Pfeiffer's compensation and conflicting accounts regarding her willingness to promote the film, ultimately contributing to its direct-to-video release in the United States. I Could Never Be Your Woman received mixed-to-positive reviews, with critics complementing Pfeiffer and Rudd's chemistry despite the film's shortcomings. She then starred in Personal Effects, in which she sparks up an unlikely romance with a much younger Ashton Kutcher.

Her next film, an adaptation of Colette's Chéri, reunited her with the director (Stephen Frears) and screenwriter (Christopher Hampton) of Dangerous Liaisons (1988). Pfeiffer played the role of the aging retired courtesan Léa de Lonval, with Rupert Friend in the title role. The Times of London reviewed the film favorably, describing Pfeiffer's performance as "magnetic and subtle, her worldly nonchalance a mask for vulnerability and heartache". Roger Ebert in the Chicago Sun-Times wrote that it was "fascinating to observe how Pfeiffer controls her face and voice during times of painful hurt". Kenneth Turan in the Los Angeles Times praised the "wordless scenes that catch Léa unawares, with the camera alone seeing the despair and regret that she hides from the world. It's the kind of refined, delicate acting Pfeiffer does so well, and it's a further reminder of how much we've missed her since she's been away."

=== 2010s ===
Following a two-year sabbatical from acting, Pfeiffer joined the large ensemble cast of Garry Marshall's romantic comedy New Year's Eve (2011), her second collaboration with the filmmaker after Frankie and Johnny. Her character, an overlooked secretary, attempts to complete her bucket list by midnight and pursues a relationship with a much younger man (Zac Efron), with whom she had previously worked on Hairspray. The film was universally panned, but some critics considered Pfeiffer and Efron's storyline one of its better elements. In 2012, she appeared in the drama People Like Us as the mother of a struggling New York City corporate trader. Rolling Stone found her to be "luminous" in the film, and The New York Times noted that hers and Elizabeth Banks's performances "partly compensate for the holes in a story whose timing is hard to swallow".

Pfeiffer reunited with Tim Burton, her Batman Returns director, for Dark Shadows (2012), based on the gothic soap opera of the same name. Determined to be involved with the project, Pfeiffer called Burton and asked to be considered for any role. In the film, she portrayed Elizabeth Collins Stoddard, the matriarch of the Collins family. Although critical reception of the film was mixed, IGN found Pfeiffer "commanding" in the role. In Luc Besson's 2013 crime comedy The Family, Pfeiffer played the "tough mother" of a Mafia family attempting to change their lives while living under the witness protection program. Despite having previously starred in two films with Robert De Niro, this marked their first time sharing scenes, a factor that influenced Pfeiffer's decision to take the role. The Family received mixed reviews, but critics for RogerEbert.com and Variety described Pfeiffer's performance as a reason to see the film.

The only trepidation was I think I took for granted how nice it was to not be under the spotlight and just having a life. I remember thinking, "Do I really want to step back into this?" And I just realized that I'm not done. I have a lot more to do, and a lot more to say. I'm never going to be one that retires.

— Pfeiffer on her comeback, 2017

Pfeiffer stated that her lack of acting throughout the 2000s was due to several reasons, including family matters and her approach to choosing roles. She said that she intended to "work a lot" once her children left for college, mentioning that she felt her best performance was "still in her", saying how that's what she felt kept her going.

In the 2017 independent drama Where Is Kyra?, she starred as a sensitive and fragile woman who loses her mother and "faces a crisis in which she must find a means for survival, all the while hiding her struggles from her new lover". Her role as Kyra was called the "performance of her life" by The Village Voice's Bilge Ebiri, and "the performance of her career" by Rolling Stone.

Pfeiffer landed the role of Ruth Madoff for the HBO Films drama The Wizard of Lies (2017), in which she played the wife of the disgraced financier Bernard Madoff, portrayed by Robert De Niro. The Tolucan Times remarked that Pfeiffer "steals the show as Madoff's wife, Ruth, and is a remarkable lookalike", while The Los Angeles Times asserted: "As Ruth, Pfeiffer convincingly portrays a pampered woman left with utterly nothing—she's lost her homes, status and, most important, her relationship with her sons." She received a nomination for the Primetime Emmy Award for Outstanding Supporting Actress in a Movie, in addition to a Golden Globe nomination.

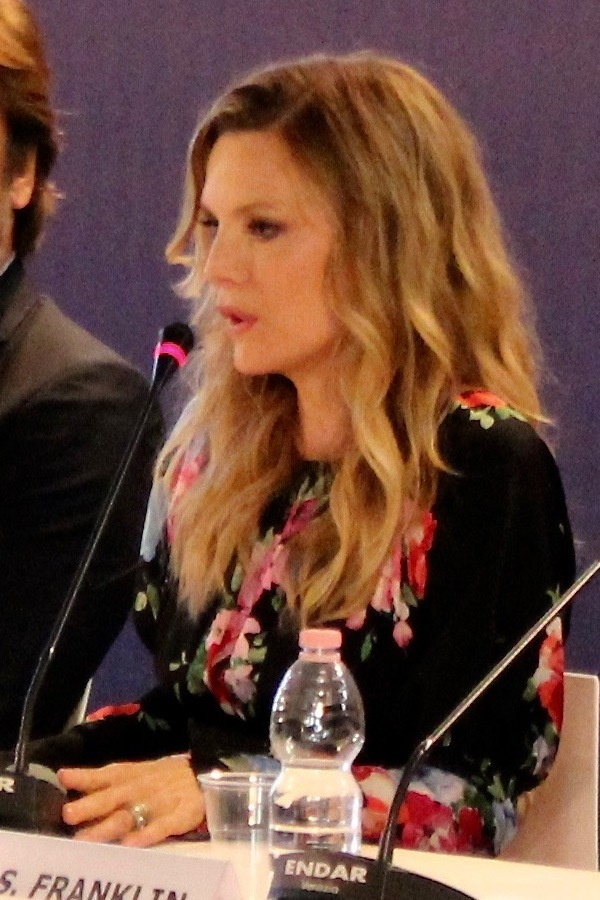
Pfeiffer speaking at an event for Mother! at the 2017 Venice Film Festival

In Darren Aronofsky's 2017 psychological horror film Mother!, Pfeiffer portrayed "woman", one of several houseguests who disrupt the tranquil life of a couple played by Jennifer Lawrence and Javier Bardem. Although Mother! divided critics, reviewers were unanimous in their praise of Pfeiffer's performance, with some considering it worthy of an Academy Award nomination. Vulture's Angelica Jade Bastién said "There's a gravity to Pfeiffer's performance that allows her to succeed where the other main actors fail". Pfeiffer played a widowed socialite in Kenneth Branagh's Murder on the Orient Express (2017), a screen adaptation of Agatha Christie's 1934 novel of the same name. The mystery film follows detective Hercule Poirot (Branagh) as he attempts to solve a murder while stranded aboard the Orient Express with several suspects. She also recorded the original song "Never Forget" for the film's soundtrack. Although some critics found the ensemble cast underused, Pfeiffer's performance was praised by Richard Roeper of the Chicago Sun-Times, Anthony Lane of The New Yorker, and Mick LaSalle of the San Francisco Chronicle.

In 2018, Pfeiffer made her Marvel Cinematic Universe debut as Janet van Dyne, the original Wasp and long-lost mother of Hope van Dyne (Evangeline Lilly), in Ant-Man and the Wasp, the sequel to Ant-Man (2015). According to director Peyton Reed, Pfeiffer had always been his dream choice for the role, leading him to cast a stand-in resembling her for Janet's brief appearance in the first film. Eric Kohn of IndieWire and Darren Franich of Entertainment Weekly felt the film offered little for an actor of Pfeiffer's caliber to do. In 2019, Pfeiffer briefly reprised the role in Avengers: Endgame, and appeared as the villainous Queen Ingrith in the fantasy film Maleficent: Mistress of Evil. Caryn James of BBC Online called her the sequel's best casting decision.

=== 2020s ===
Pfeiffer headlined the dark comedy French Exit (2020), directed by Azazel Jacobs and based on the 2018 novel of the same name by Patrick deWitt. In the film, Pfeiffer played a widow who moves to Paris with her son (Lucas Hedges) and a cat that is revealed to be her reincarnated husband. Peter Debruge of Variety said that Pfeiffer delivered a performance "for which she'll be remembered", and she received a Golden Globe nomination for Best Actress – Motion Picture Comedy or Musical.

Pfeiffer portrayed former First Lady Betty Ford in the anthology drama television series The First Lady, which premiered on Showtime in 2022. The show received mixed reviews, but critics often deemed Pfeiffer's performance a highlight among its three leads. The following year, she reprised the role of Janet van Dyne in Ant-Man and the Wasp: Quantumania, about which The New York Times critic Manohla Dargis declared Pfeiffer the film's MVP. In 2025, she starred in the Amazon Prime Video Christmas comedy film Oh. What. Fun. as a Texan housewife whose feelings of being taken for granted by her family drive her to appear on a morning talk show. The film received negative reviews, with reviewers agreeing that Pfeiffer's performance was let down by the script.

As of 2026, Pfeiffer stars in two television series: the Paramount+ drama The Madison, and the Apple TV comedy Margo's Got Money Troubles. For The Madison, Pfeiffer agreed to star without reading a script, as creator Taylor Sheridan preferred to write after casting his actors. Adapted from the Rufi Thorpe novel, Margo's Got Money Troubles is created and produced by Pfeiffer's husband, David E. Kelley, who suggested her for the role of Shayanne Millet, the title character's mother. Despite their long careers in Hollywood and their marriage, To Gillian on Her 37th Birthday (1996) had been their only prior on-screen credit together. For her performance, she was nominated for the Primetime Emmy Award for Outstanding Supporting Actress in a Comedy Series. As one of its executive producers, she also received a nomination for Outstanding Comedy Series. In August 2026, following her positive experiences in television, Pfeiffer expressed a strong preference for working on ensemble projects over starring film roles, though she later clarified she was not stepping away from lead roles in movies.

== Acting style and reception ==
Pfeiffer has said that, due to her lack of conventional training, she sometimes feels fraudulent as an actor. She has credited director Milton Katselas with teaching her to recognize the difference between how an actor and their character would behave in the same scene. The essayist Angelica Jade Bastién has said that Pfeiffer's talent disproves any argument that untrained actors are lesser than their trained peers. Several film critics have described Pfeiffer as "a character actress in a screen siren's body". Her acting coach Peggy Feury was among the first to describe her as a character actress and encouraged her to "play as many different kinds of characters as you can". The journalist James Kaplan reported that some critics feel Pfeiffer has undersold herself by prioritizing character roles instead of capitalizing on her beauty. Pfeiffer has said she rarely accepts glamorous roles because she finds few of them compelling, and believes she had been pigeonholed as either ice queens or blond Californians prior to Married to the Mob (1988).

During the 1980s, Pfeiffer typically played smart, funny, and independent women, and pursued a wider range of roles in the 1990s. She has expressed a fondness for playing imperfect, evil, and "slightly trashy" women. Matt Mazur of PopMatters observed that much of Pfeiffer's work contains feminist themes, with women's issues at the forefront of its narratives, and cited her as having one of Hollywood's most impressive track records of working on films with other women. In a 2021 profile, the journalist Lynn Hirschberg said Pfeiffer excels in emotionally conflicted roles, while Adam Platt of New Woman and Bilge Ebiri of the Miami New Times agreed that she often plays reserved, emotionally detached women. Backstage contributor Manuel Betancourt observed parallels between Pfeiffer's characters and her own determination to subvert expectations, with the actress confirming that she searches new projects for relatability. However, Town & Country's Adam Rathe finds Pfeiffer dissimilar to most of her characters. Known to be highly selective about projects, Pfeiffer, according to IndieWire's Kate Erbland, carefully chooses unconventional roles to avoid typecasting. Pfeiffer's colleagues have described her as extremely committed, competent, and prepared, although she avoids watching her own performances. She prefers acting in dramas over comedies but does not have a favorite film genre to perform in. According to Mike Celizic, she has almost always been perceived as a serious actress and seldom described as "funny" throughout her career, but film critic Stephanie Zacharek argued that her longevity could be attributed to her ability to seemingly blur the lines between comedy and drama.

Pfeiffer has simultaneously been called one of the greatest actresses of her generation and one of Hollywood's most underrated. The Hollywood Reporter said she "is too seldom ranked among the best of her generation". In 2009, the journalist Brian D. Johnson said that Pfeiffer had yet to exhibit her true acting range and argued she could potentially be as revered as Meryl Streep if afforded the same opportunities. The film critic Mick LaSalle remarked that Pfeiffer's humility has sometimes caused the general public to overlook her. She was cited as a favorite actor of the film critic Pauline Kael. Pfeiffer is particularly noted for her versatility. In 1999, Salon's Charles Taylor wrote that no actor of the decade had rivaled Pfeiffer's versatility. Kate Erbland summarized her career as eclectic, noting that she has rarely repeated acting choices. Pfeiffer has similarly stated that she has always aimed to portray the widest possible range of characters, even when her opportunities were limited.

Pfeiffer was one of the highest-paid actresses of the 1980s and 1990s, typically earning $9–$10 million per film during the latter decade. Few of her films during the 1980s were major box office successes. In 1995, The New York Times journalist Bernard Weinraub said Pfeiffer belongs to a group of respected actresses who are "not considered a big box-office draw". However, several critics noted that her performances remained consistently acclaimed despite a number of mediocre films and box-office returns. Film critic David Thomson argued that some of Pfeiffer's weaker films suffer from the perception that she does not appear to enjoy working or acting. Regardless, she was the sixth highest-grossing domestic box office star of 1990 and one of the few actresses whose salary corresponded with their box office appeal as of 1996, according to UPI. In 1996, Entertainment Weekly ranked her the 67th greatest movie star of all time. By 1999, Variety had named Pfeiffer "the female movie star most likely to improve a film's box-office appeal", and ranked her the fifth highest-grossing actress with starring roles, citing her 13 films, which had collectively grossed over $630.9 million at the time. Pfeiffer was named one of the "100 Greatest Movie Stars of Our Time" by People in 2002, appearing as one of 20 actors in the issue's "Icons" section.

Pfeiffer was awarded a motion picture star on the Hollywood Walk of Fame in 2007. She was honored by Grauman's Chinese Theatre on April 25, 2025, with a hand and footprint ceremony.

== Public image ==
Pfeiffer has been described as one of the world's most beautiful and talented actresses. As a result of being typecast in early roles based on her physical appearance, she sought out more challenging roles, to convince directors to take her seriously as an actor. Critics regularly undermined Pfeiffer's work by focusing on her appearance instead of her acting. In 1993, the film critic Ty Burr argued that while her "unshowy performances work because they don't call attention to themselves", her attractiveness often prevents her from being seriously considered "one of today's best screen actresses". Noted as being a private person, Matthew Jacobs of HuffPost stated that Pfeiffer's aversion to movie stardom allows her to play authentic characters, uncompromised by her own fame. Analyzing her public persona for Metrograph, Luke Goodsell said that, unlike her peers, Pfeiffer maintained an elusiveness during the 1990s that made her difficult to categorize. She is open about disliking giving press interviews and believes it is not an actor's responsibility to promote their films. Vikram Murthi of The Nation believes Pfeiffer's aversion to publicity "has lent her an air of gravitas, of someone who directs a spotlight rather than chases after it".

Pfeiffer was one of the defining sex symbols of the 1980s and 1990s and was considered one of the era's "it girls". At one point, she was among the world's biggest movie stars. In 1990, Pfeiffer appeared on the cover of People magazine's inaugural annual "Most Beautiful People in the World" issue. She was featured in the issue a record-breaking six times throughout the decade. In 2004, the magazine named her one of the most beautiful women of all time. In 2020, Vogue Paris listed Pfeiffer as one of the 21 most beautiful American actresses of all time. Men's Health ranked Pfeiffer 45th and 67th on their all-time hottest women and sex symbol rankings, respectively. According to several plastic surgeons, Pfeiffer possesses some of the most sought-after celebrity features among clients. In 2001, the plastic surgeon Stephen R. Marquardt declared her the most anatomically beautiful face in Hollywood. Nicknamed the "golden ratio", Pfeiffer's face, Marquardt claimed, adheres to a mathematical formula in which he determined a person's ideal mouth is 1.618 times as wide as their nose. Several outlets have commented on Pfeiffer's perceived ability to age slowly.

Commentators noted that Pfeiffer had unexpectedly become a "pop-music muse" in 2014. Her name is mentioned in two of the year's most popular songs: "Uptown Funk" by Mark Ronson featuring Bruno Mars, and "Riptide" by Vance Joy, with both artists expressing admiration for her work. In 2021, the singer-songwriter Ethel Cain released her debut single, "Michelle Pfeiffer". Australian cricketers speak of "getting a Michelle" when they take five wickets in an innings. In cricket parlance, this is referred to as a "five for", a near-homophone for "Pfeiffer", which resulted in the nickname "Michelle".

== Other ventures ==
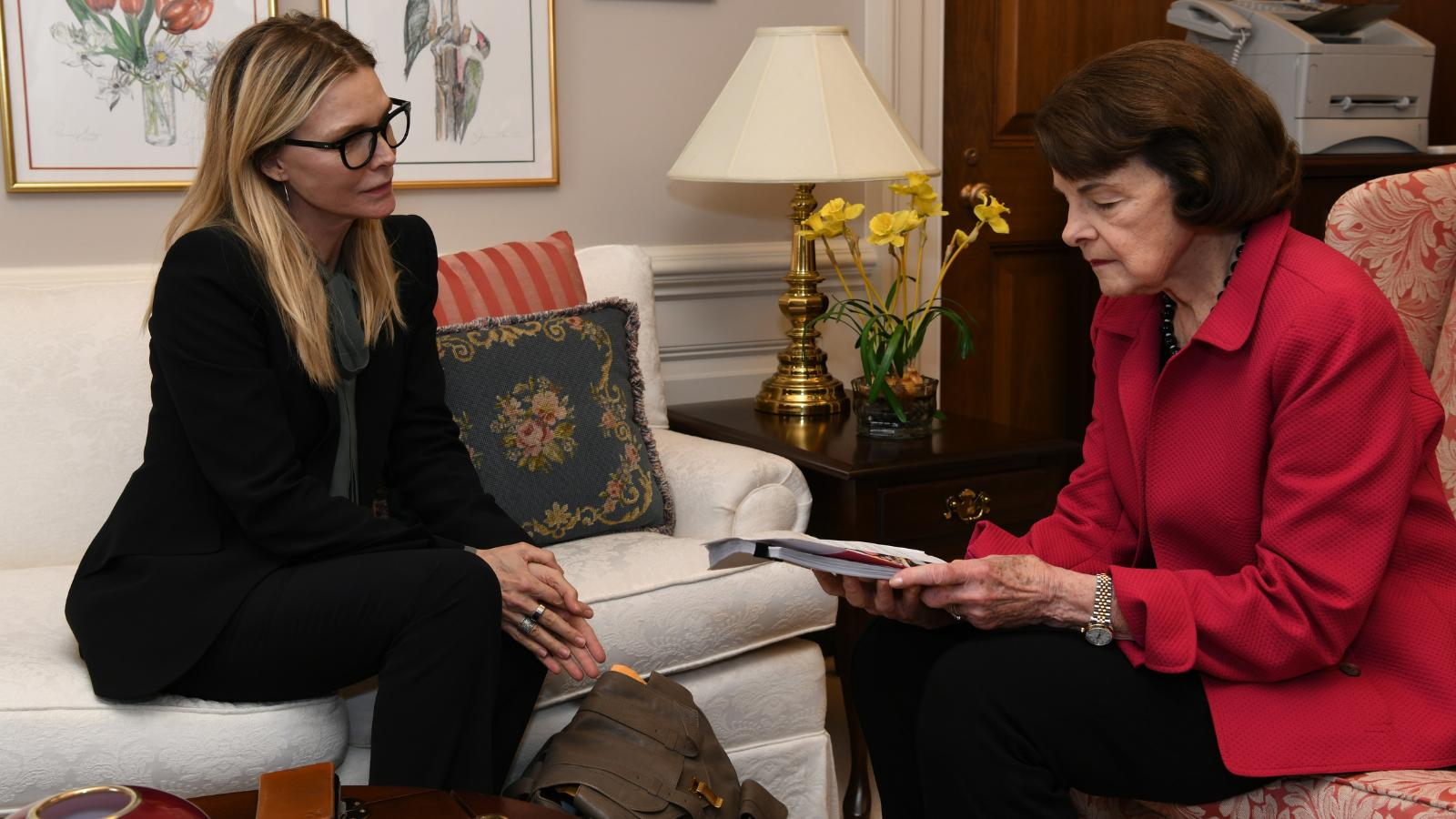
Pfeiffer meeting with Senator Dianne Feinstein to support the Personal Care Product Safety Act in 2019

=== Product and endorsements ===
In 2005, Pfeiffer served as the face of Giorgio Armani's spring campaign; the designer has often dressed her for public appearances.

In 2019, she launched a collection of fragrances called Henry Rose. It is the first fragrance line to be both Cradle to Cradle Certified and EWG Verified.

In 2025, Pfeiffer fronted the fashion house Yves Saint Laurent's Summer 2025 collection.

=== Philanthropy ===
Having been a smoker for ten years (she quit in 1992) and having a niece who suffered from leukemia for ten years, Pfeiffer is a supporter of the American Cancer Society. She also supports the Humane Society. In 2016, she attended the Healthy Child Healthy World's L.A. Gala for people who lead organizations for children's environmental health. In December of that year, Pfeiffer, who was vegan at the time, joined the board of directors for the Environmental Working Group, an advocacy organization based in Washington. D.C.

== Personal life ==
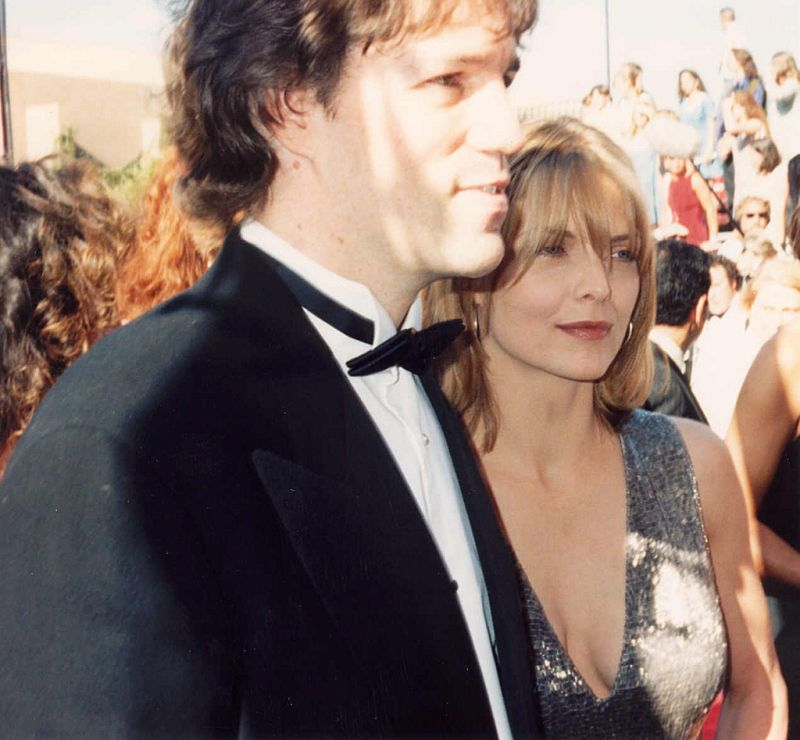
Pfeiffer with husband David E. Kelley at the 46th Primetime Emmy Awards in 1994

Soon after coming to Hollywood at the age of 20, Pfeiffer was taken in by a friendly couple who ran a metaphysics and vegetarian cult. They helped her to cease drinking, smoking, and taking drugs. Over time, they took control of her entire life. Much of her money went to the group. "I was brainwashed", she said, "I gave them an enormous amount of money".

At an acting class taught by Milton Katselas in Los Angeles, Pfeiffer met fellow budding actor Peter Horton, and they began dating. They married in Santa Monica in 1981; it was on their honeymoon that she discovered she had won the lead role in Grease 2. Horton directed Pfeiffer in a 1985 ABC TV special, One Too Many, where she played the high school girlfriend of an alcoholic student. In 1987, the real-life couple played an on-screen couple in the 'Hospital' segment of John Landis's comedy skit compilation Amazon Women on the Moon.

In 1988, Pfeiffer had an affair with John Malkovich, her co-star in Dangerous Liaisons, who at the time was married to Glenne Headly.

Pfeiffer and Horton separated in 1988 and were divorced two years later. Horton later blamed the split on their devotion to work rather than their marriage. Pfeiffer then had a three-year relationship with actor/producer Fisher Stevens, whom she met while starring as Olivia in the New York Shakespeare Festival production of Twelfth Night, where Stevens played Sir Andrew Aguecheek.

In 1993, Pfeiffer married the television writer and producer David E. Kelley. She made a brief uncredited cameo appearance in one episode of Kelley's television series Picket Fences and played the title character in To Gillian on Her 37th Birthday, for which Kelley wrote the screenplay. She had entered into private adoption proceedings before she met Kelley, and in March 1993, she adopted a newborn girl, who was christened on Pfeiffer's and Kelley's wedding day. In 1994, Pfeiffer gave birth to a son. In September 2025, she revealed that she had become a grandmother the previous year.

Pfeiffer experimented with a plant-based diet for a few years but later returned to eating meat and advocated a "paleoish" diet.

== Acting credits and accolades ==
According to the review aggregation website Rotten Tomatoes, Pfeiffer's most acclaimed films include Scarface (1983), Dangerous Liaisons (1988), Married to the Mob (1988), The Fabulous Baker Boys (1989), Batman Returns (1992), The Age of Innocence (1993), The Prince of Egypt (1998), Hairspray (2007), Stardust (2007), and Where Is Kyra? (2017).

Pfeiffer has received three Academy Award nominations: Best Supporting Actress for Dangerous Liaisons (1988); and Best Actress for The Fabulous Baker Boys (1989) and Love Field (1992). She won the Golden Globe Award for Best Actress - Motion Picture Drama for The Fabulous Baker Boys and has been nominated seven more times, for her performances in Married to the Mob (1988), The Russia House (1990), Frankie and Johnny (1991), Love Field, The Age of Innocence (1993), The Wizard of Lies (2017), and French Exit (2020). For Dangerous Liaisons, she won the BAFTA Award for Best Actress in a Supporting Role. She also received a Primetime Emmy Award nomination for The Wizard of Lies.
