= The Russia House =

1989 spy novel by John le Carré

- First edition
- Author: John le Carré
- Language: English
- Genre: Spy fiction
- Publisher: Hodder & Stoughton
- Publication date: 1 June 1989
- Publication place: United Kingdom
- Media type: Print (hardback and paperback)
- Pages: 384 (hardback edition)
- ISBN: 0-340-50573-7 (hardback edition)
- OCLC: 19271245
- LC Class: PR6062.E33 L43 1989

The Russia House is a spy novel by British writer John le Carré published in 1989. The title refers to the nickname given to the portion of the British Secret Intelligence Service that was devoted to spying on the Soviet Union. A film based on the novel was released in 1990 starring Sean Connery and Michelle Pfeiffer, adapted for the screen by Tom Stoppard, and directed by Fred Schepisi. The BBC produced a radio play starring Tom Baker.

== Plot summary ==
In 1987, Bartholomew "Barley" Scott Blair, a British publisher, is at a book fair in Moscow. With business friends he goes on a drunken retreat to a secluded dacha in the forest near Peredelkino. When their talk turns to politics, Barley finds himself talking boldly of patriotism and courage, of a new world order, and an end to Cold War tensions. One attentive listener, "Goethe", asks him privately whether he truly believes in the possibility of such a world. Barley convincingly says that he does.

Several months later in Moscow, a woman named Katya seeks Barley out at an audio fair, hoping to convince him to publish a manuscript for her friend Yakov which details Soviet nuclear capabilities and atomic secrets. The manuscript has a cover letter to Barley, saying that Yakov is trying to serve his country by hastening the day when democracy will come to the Soviet Union. However, Barley is in Lisbon so Katya gives the package to Niki Landau to forward it to Barley. When Landau is unable to locate Barley, the manuscript is sent to the Secret Intelligence Service (MI6). Their Russia House is more than interested in it and ask Barley to contact Yakov with a list of verifying questions to determine the document's authenticity. Barley is content to stay out of the matter, but he is manipulated into undertaking the mission. He grows fond of Katya and begins thinking of a way to get her out of the Soviet Union.

Over the course of several meetings with Katya and Yakov, Barley realises his nervous informant is very likely under KGB scrutiny. The CIA and MI6 decide one final meeting is needed to verify the authenticity of the data, but Yakov is suddenly "hospitalized" due to purported exhaustion. In a secure phone call, Yakov tells Katya through code that he has been taken and that she is in danger. Barley and Katya realise that any further meeting is merely a KGB scheme to draw them out into the open.

Barley receives a message that he must bring "a final and exhaustive" list of questions on Soviet research. He makes contact with one of his Soviet publishing associates who uses his connections in the KGB to arrange a meeting with Yakov's handlers. Although the CIA and MI6 set up a major surveillance operation at the meeting site, Barley goes missing along with the last set of questions, presumably arrested.

More than a year later, after several unconfirmed sightings in Moscow, Barley shows up in Portugal, offering no explanation for his absence. Neither the CIA nor MI6 are inclined to interrogate him, reasoning that the KGB has already worn him down to get the information they needed. The truth, however, is that Barley traded the questions for the freedom of Katya and her family. The philosophical Barley reasons that governments are not the only ones who can manipulate and betray, and some things are more important than the games that spies play with others' lives.

== Critical reception ==
A contemporary review for Publishers Weekly said, "Le Carré's Russia is funny and touching by turns but always convincing, and the love affair between Barley and Katya, subtly understated, is by far the warmest the author has created. " In a review by Kirkus Reviews the anonymous reviewer called the book Le Carré's "drollest work thus far, his simplest plot by a long shot, and sturdy entertainment throughout—even if not in the same league with the Karla trilogy and other le Carré classics" and summarized; "Barley is a grand, Dickensian creation, the ugly Americans are a richly diverting crew, and this is witty, shapely tale-spinning from a modern master." In a review for The New York Times, Christopher Lehmann-Haupt wrote: "there remains a murky complexity to Mr. le Carré's prose that isn't justified by the somewhat simplistic inevitability of his plot. The love affair that ends up undermining Barley's patriotism seems forced in its detail and leaves a void of credibility at the heart of the story."

== Film and audio adaptations ==
A film based on the novel was released in 1990, starring Sean Connery and Michelle Pfeiffer, directed by Fred Schepisi. It was one of the first western films to be shot on location in the Soviet Union. Principal photography included scenes in and around Moscow and Leningrad (now St Petersburg).

The BBC produced a radio play of the novel adapted by René Basilico in seven episodes. It was broadcast in 1994 and starred Tom Baker as Barley Blair.
