= List of Grauman's Chinese Theatre handprint ceremonies =

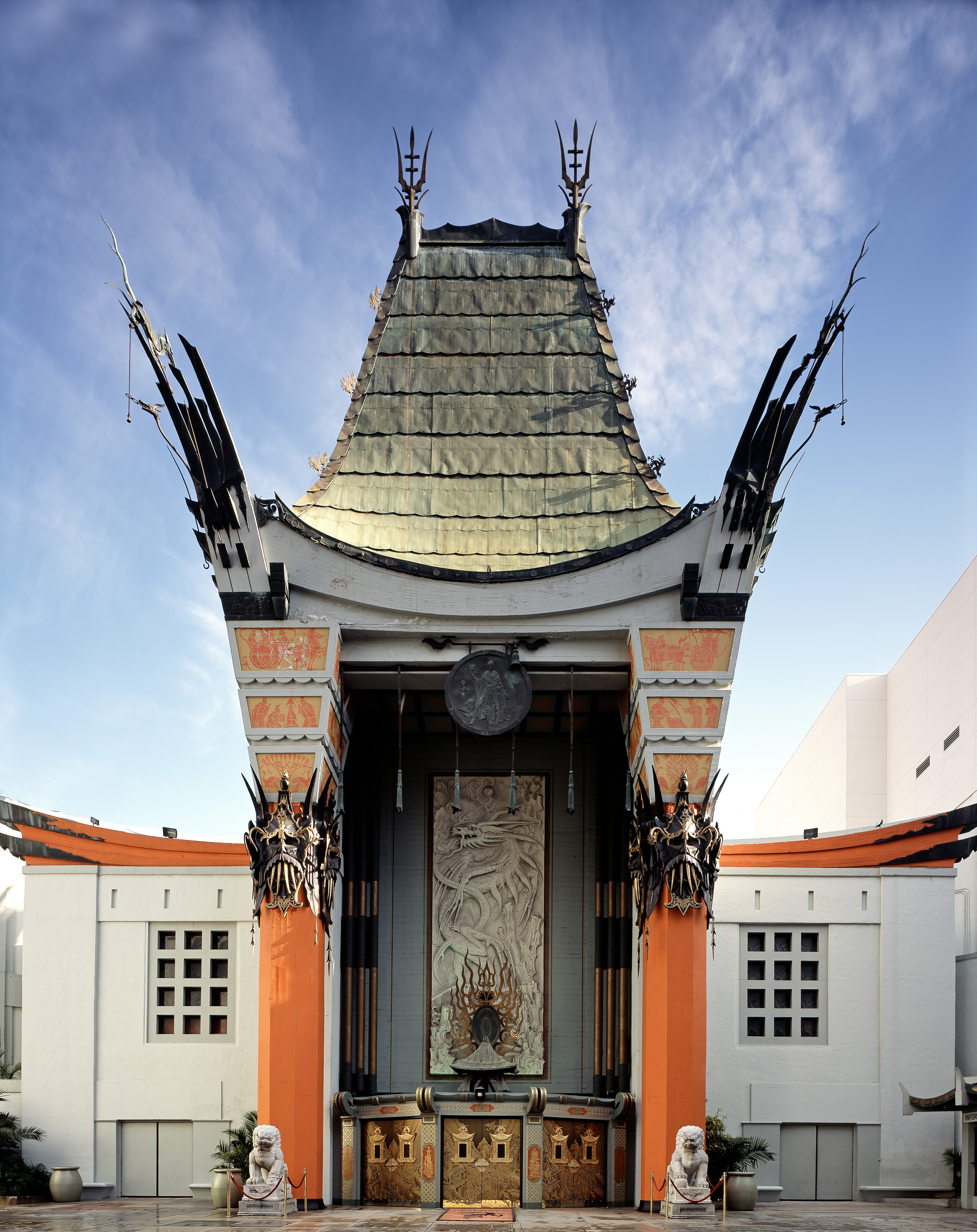
Entrance of Grauman's Chinese Theatre in Hollywood

This is a list of handprint ceremonies for the TCL Chinese Theatre in Hollywood Los Angeles, California (originally "Grauman's Chinese Theatre"). Footprints and signatures are also included, and in some cases imprints of other objects and body parts:

- Sonja Henie imprinted her ice skates.
- John Barrymore imprinted the side of his face, a nod to his nickname "The Great Profile".
- Roy Rogers, in addition to having his horse Trigger's hoofprints next to his, imprinted his revolver.
- Mel Brooks wore a prosthetic sixth finger.
- Eleanor Powell imprinted a pair of her tap shoes.
- Jimmy Durante imprinted his nose, as did Jackie Chan in 1997.
- Betty Grable imprinted her leg.
- Emma Watson imprinted Hermione Granger's wand.
- Rupert Grint imprinted Ron Weasley's wand.
- Daniel Radcliffe imprinted Harry Potter's wand.
- Harold Lloyd imprinted his eyeglasses.
- Whoopi Goldberg imprinted her dreadlocks.
- Marilyn Monroe imprinted her earring.
- Yoshiki imprinted his drumsticks.

== 1920s ==
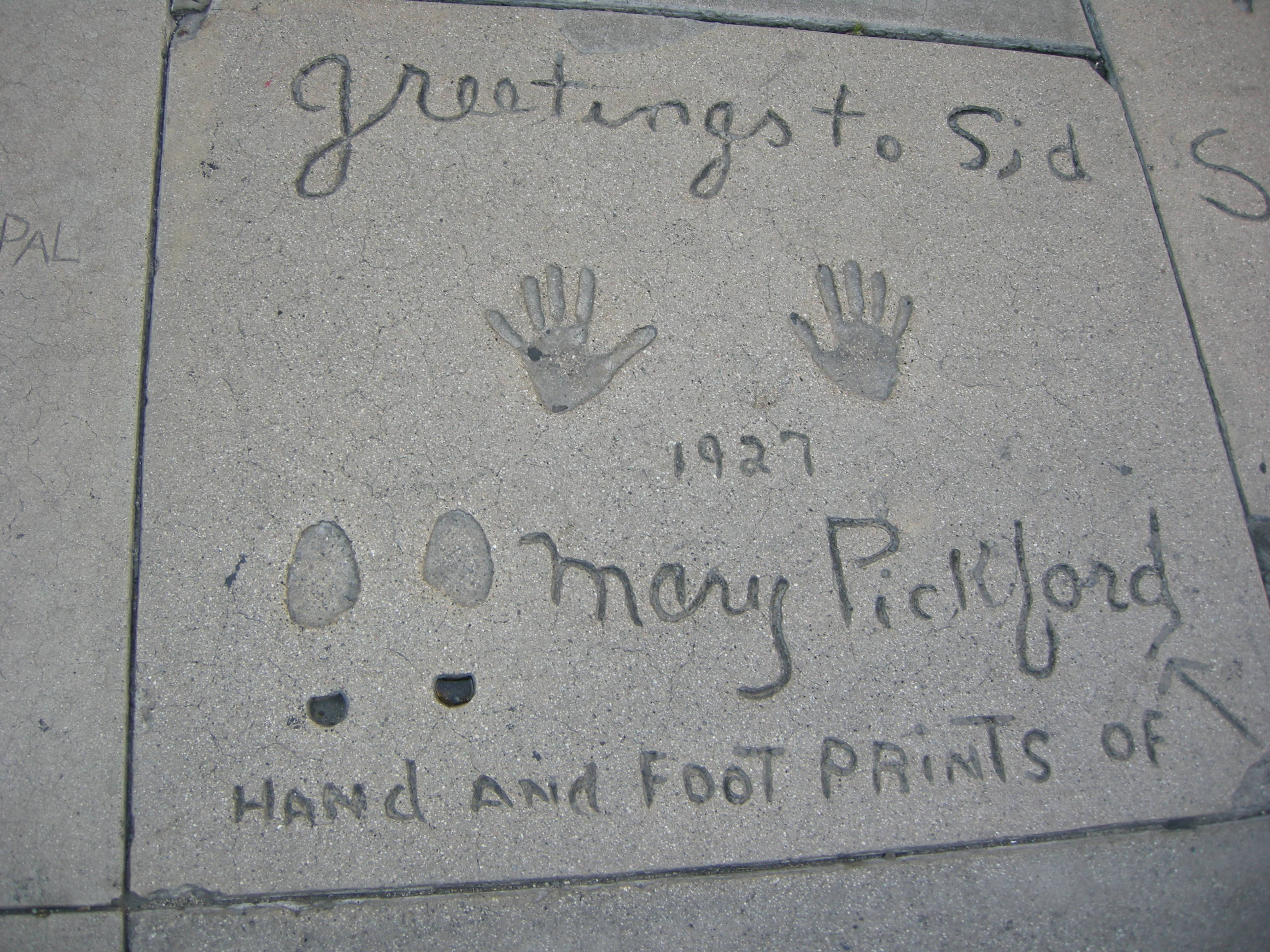
Mary Pickford's impressions. April 1927.

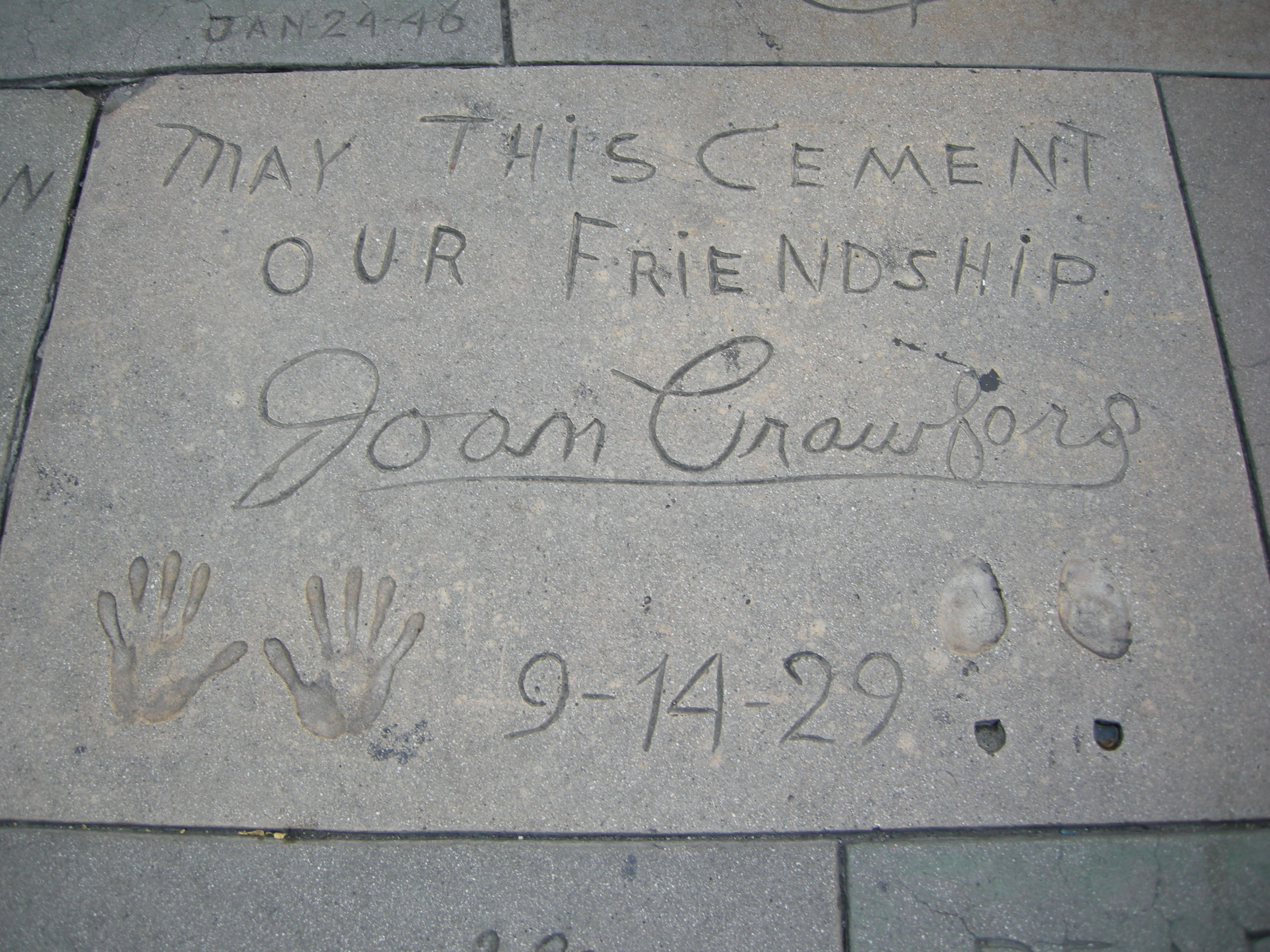
Joan Crawford's impressions. September 1929.

- Norma Talmadge (post dated for the opening day May 18, 1927)
- Mary Pickford (April 30, 1927)
- Douglas Fairbanks (April 30, 1927)
- Norma Shearer (August 1, 1927)
- Harold Lloyd (November 21, 1927)
- William S. Hart (November 28, 1927)
- Tom Mix and Tony the Wonder Horse (December 12, 1927)
- Colleen Moore (December 19, 1927)
- Gloria Swanson (circa 1927)
- Constance Talmadge (circa 1927)
- Pola Negri (April 2, 1928)
- Bebe Daniels (May 11, 1929)
- Marion Davies (May 13, 1929)
- Janet Gaynor (May 29, 1929)
- Joan Crawford (September 14, 1929)

== 1930s ==
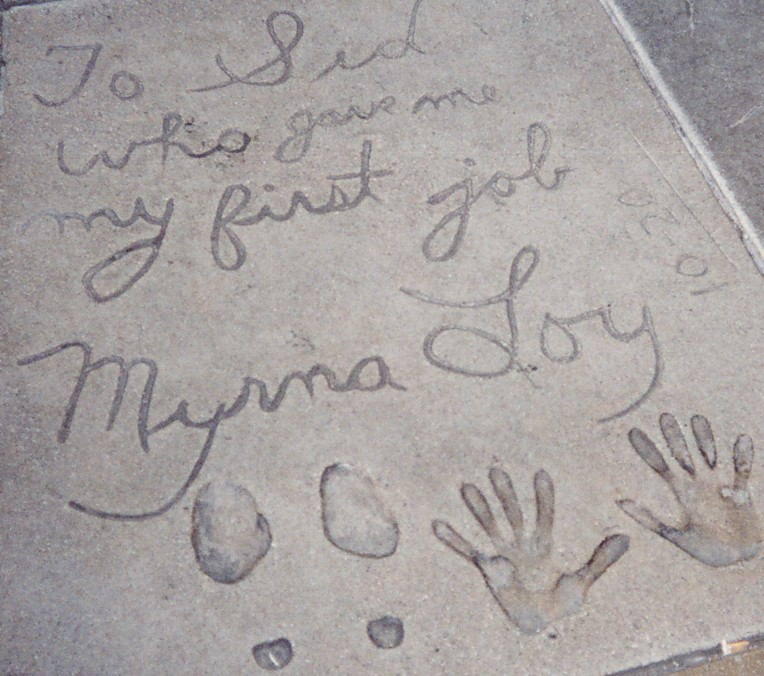
Many older entries contain personal messages to Sid Grauman, such as Myrna Loy's 1936 contribution. Her first job was as a dancer at the theater in the 1920s.

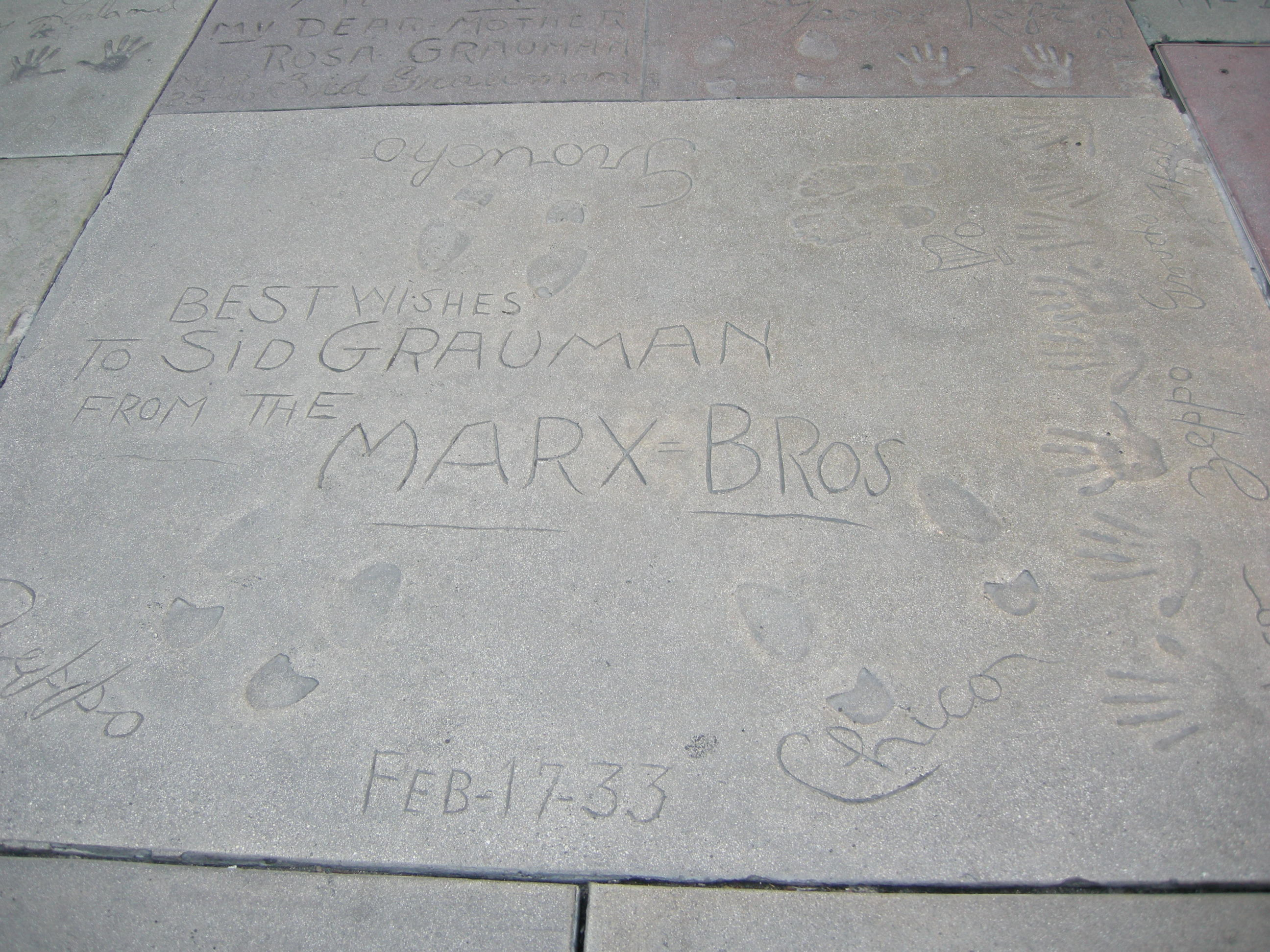
The Marx Brothers, Chico, Groucho, Harpo, and Zeppo. February 1933.

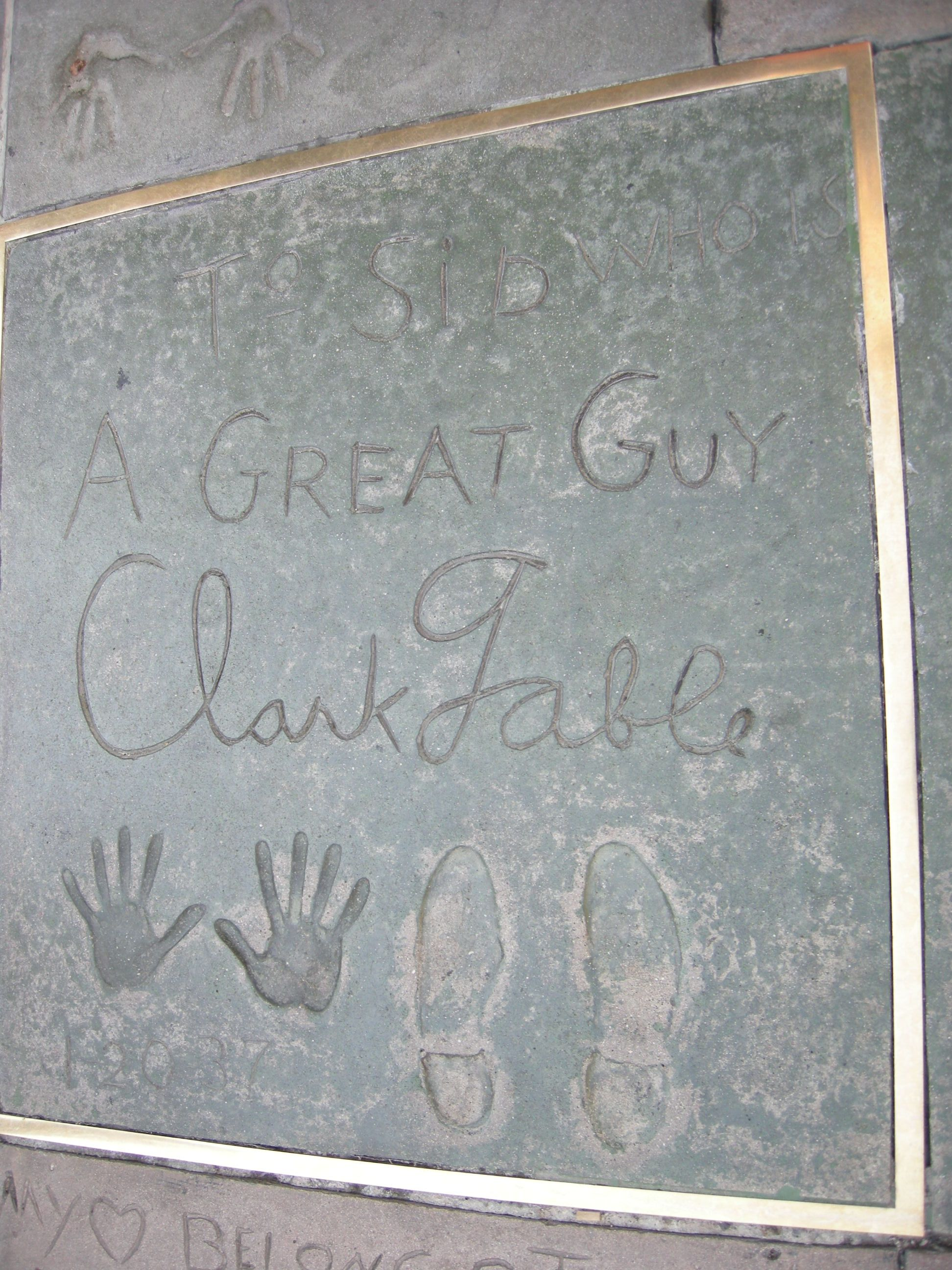
Clark Gable's hand and footprints. January 1937.

- Ann Harding (August 30, 1930)
- Raoul Walsh (November 14, 1930)
- Wallace Beery (January 31, 1931)
- Marie Dressler (January 31, 1931)
- Jackie Cooper (December 12, 1931)
- Eddie Cantor (March 9, 1932)
- Diana Wynyard (January 26, 1933)
- The Marx Brothers (February 17, 1933)
- Jean Harlow (September 25 and September 29, 1933)
- Maurice Chevalier (December 4, 1934)
- Jeanette MacDonald (December 4, 1934)
- Shirley Temple (March 14, 1935)
- Joe E. Brown (March 5, 1936)
- Al Jolson (March 12, 1936)
- Freddie Bartholomew (April 4, 1936)
- Bing Crosby (April 8, 1936)
- Victor McLaglen (May 25, 1936)
- William Powell and Myrna Loy (October 20, 1936)
- Clark Gable and W. S. Van Dyke (January 20, 1937)
- Dick Powell and Joan Blondell (February 10, 1937)
- Fredric March (April 21, 1937)
- May Robson (April 22, 1937)
- Tyrone Power and Loretta Young (May 31, 1937)
- Sonja Henie (June 28, 1937)
- The Ritz Brothers (September 22, 1937)
- Eleanor Powell (December 23, 1937)
- Don Ameche (January 27, 1938)
- Fred Astaire (February 4, 1938)
- Deanna Durbin (February 7, 1938)
- Alice Faye and Tony Martin (March 20, 1938)
- Edgar Bergen and Charlie McCarthy (July 20, 1938)
- Jean Hersholt (October 11, 1938)
- Mickey Rooney (October 18, 1938)
- Nelson Eddy (December 28, 1938)
- Ginger Rogers (September 5, 1939)
- Judy Garland (October 10, 1939)
- Jane Withers (November 6, 1939)

== 1940s ==
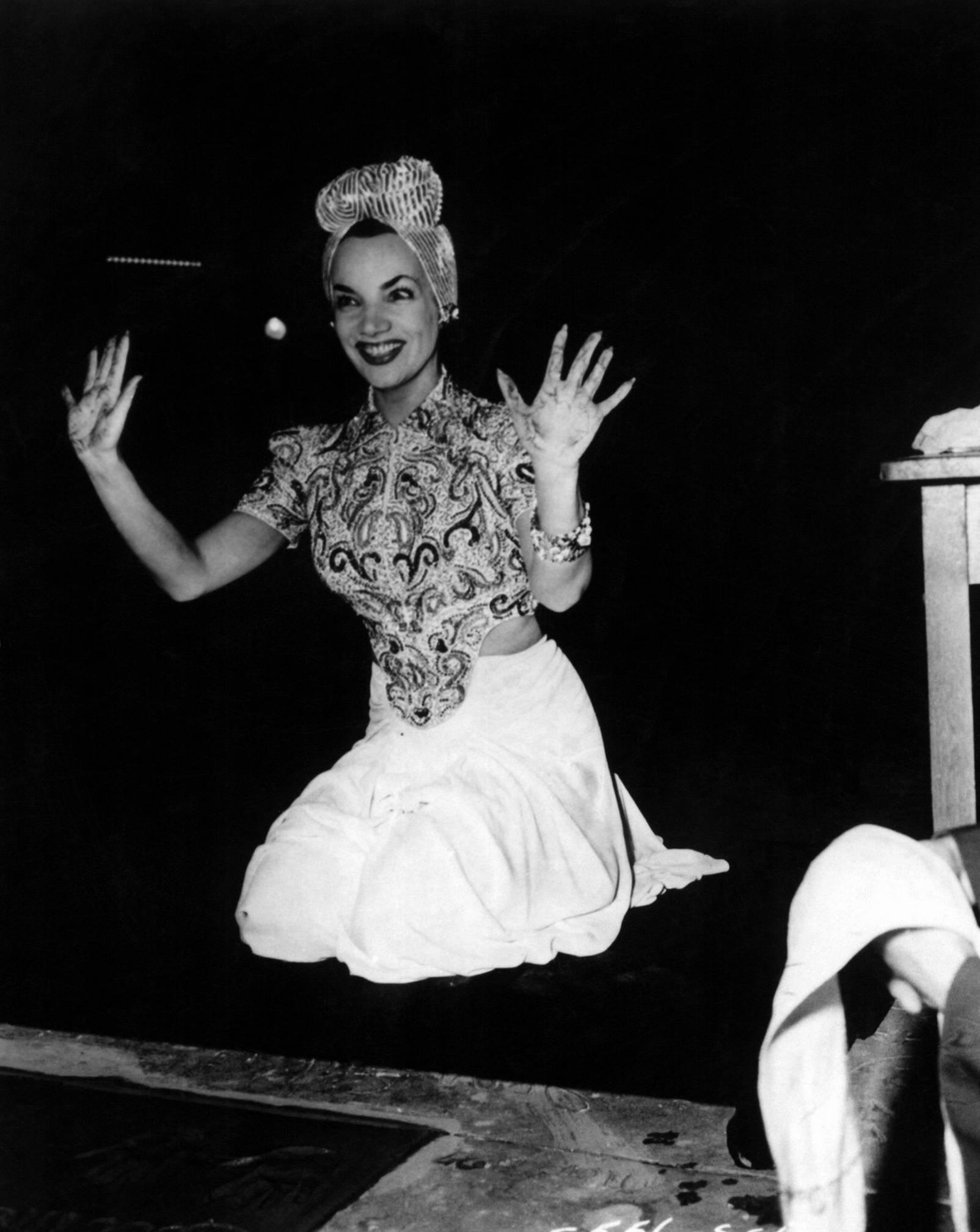
Carmen Miranda's imprint ceremony, March 24, 1941.

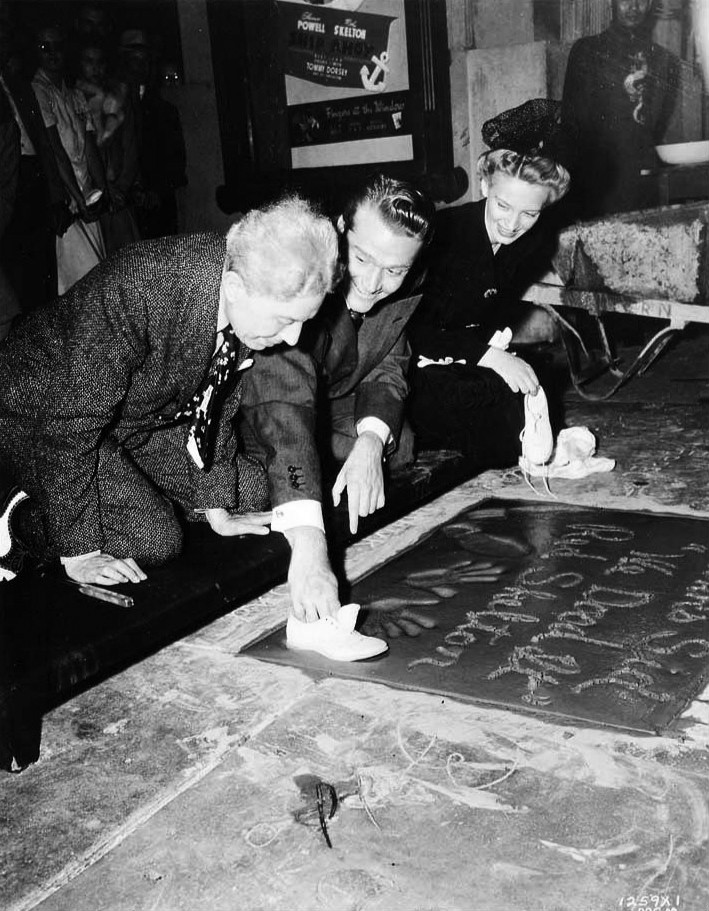
Red Skelton's imprint ceremony, June 18, 1942. From left: Sid Grauman, Skelton, Edna Skelton. Skelton also imprinted his "Junior" character's shoes.

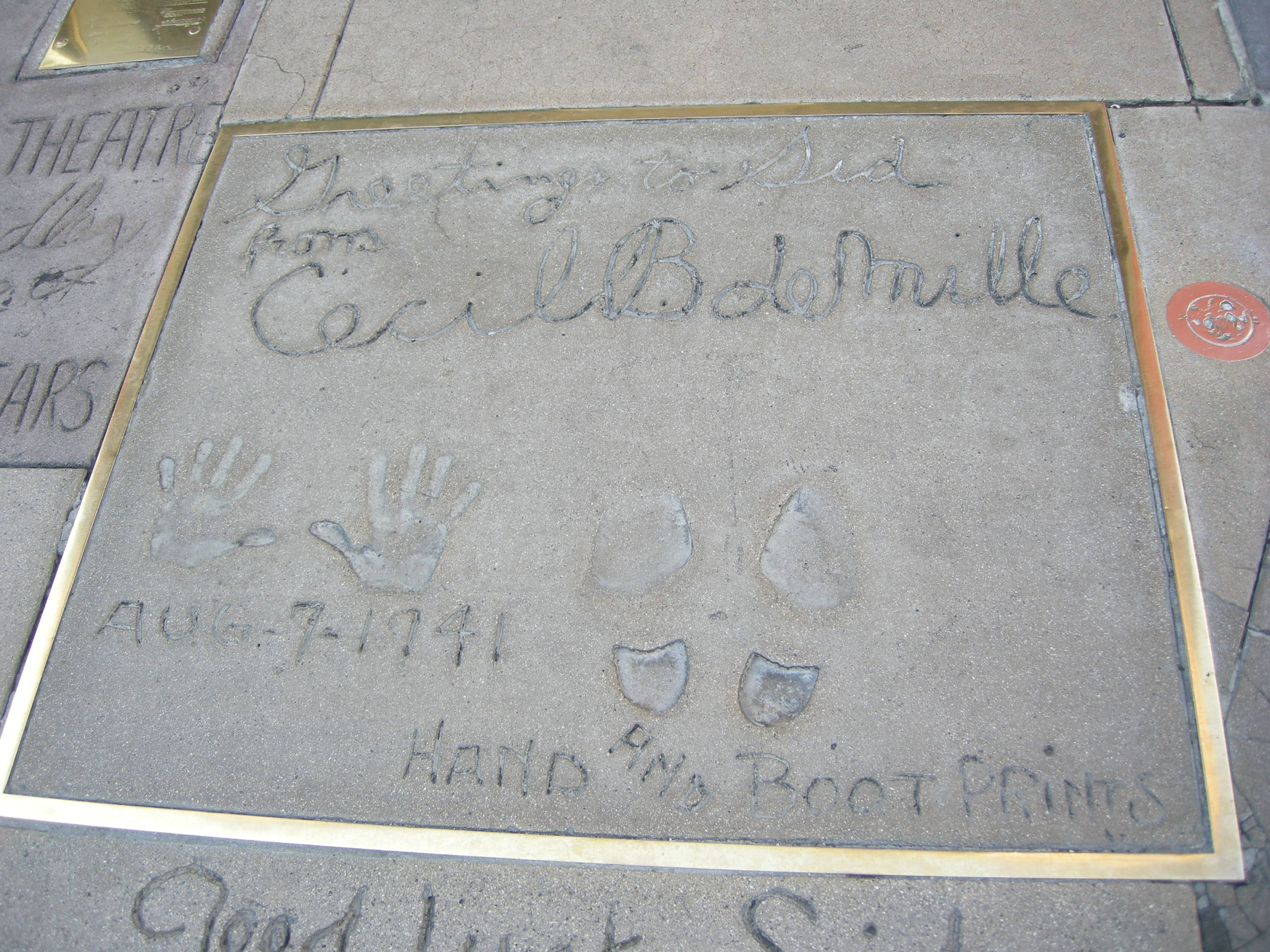
Cecil B. DeMille's square. August 1941.

- Linda Darnell (March 18, 1940)
- Rosa Grauman (mother of theatre owner, Sid) and George Raft (March 25, 1940)
- John Barrymore (September 5, 1940)
- Jack Benny (January 13, 1941)
- Carmen Miranda (March 24, 1941)
- Barbara Stanwyck and Robert Taylor (June 11, 1941)
- Rudy Vallée (July 21, 1941)
- Cecil B. DeMille (August 7, 1941)
- The Family of Judge James K. Hardy (August 15, 1941)
- Abbott and Costello (December 8, 1941)
- Edward Arnold (January 6, 1942)
- Joan Fontaine (May 26, 1942)
- Red Skelton (June 18, 1942)
- Greer Garson and Mrs. Miniver (July 23, 1942)
- Edward G. Robinson (July 24, 1942)
- Henry Fonda, Rita Hayworth, and Charles Boyer (July 24, 1942)
- Charles Laughton (July 24, 1942)
- Bob Hope and Dorothy Lamour (February 5, 1943)
- Betty Grable (February 15, 1943)
- Monty Woolley (May 28, 1943)
- Gary Cooper (August 13, 1943)
- Esther Williams and Private Joe Brain (August 1, 1944)
- Jack Oakie (February 21, 1945)
- Jimmy Durante (October 31, 1945)
- Sid Grauman (January 24, 1946)
- Gene Tierney (January 24, 1946)
- Irene Dunne (July 8, 1946)
- Rex Harrison (July 8, 1946)
- Margaret O'Brien (August 15, 1946)
- Humphrey Bogart (August 21, 1946)
- Louella Parsons (September 30, 1946)
- Ray Milland (April 17, 1947)
- Lauritz Melchior (November 17, 1947)
- James Stewart (February 13, 1948)
- Van Johnson (March 25, 1948)
- George Jessel (March 1, 1949)
- Roy Rogers and Trigger (April 21, 1949)
- Richard Widmark and Charles Nelson (April 24, 1949)
- Jeanne Crain (October 17, 1949)
- Jean Hersholt (October 20, 1949)
- Anne Baxter and Gregory Peck (December 15, 1949)
- Gene Autry and Champion (December 23, 1949)

== 1950s ==
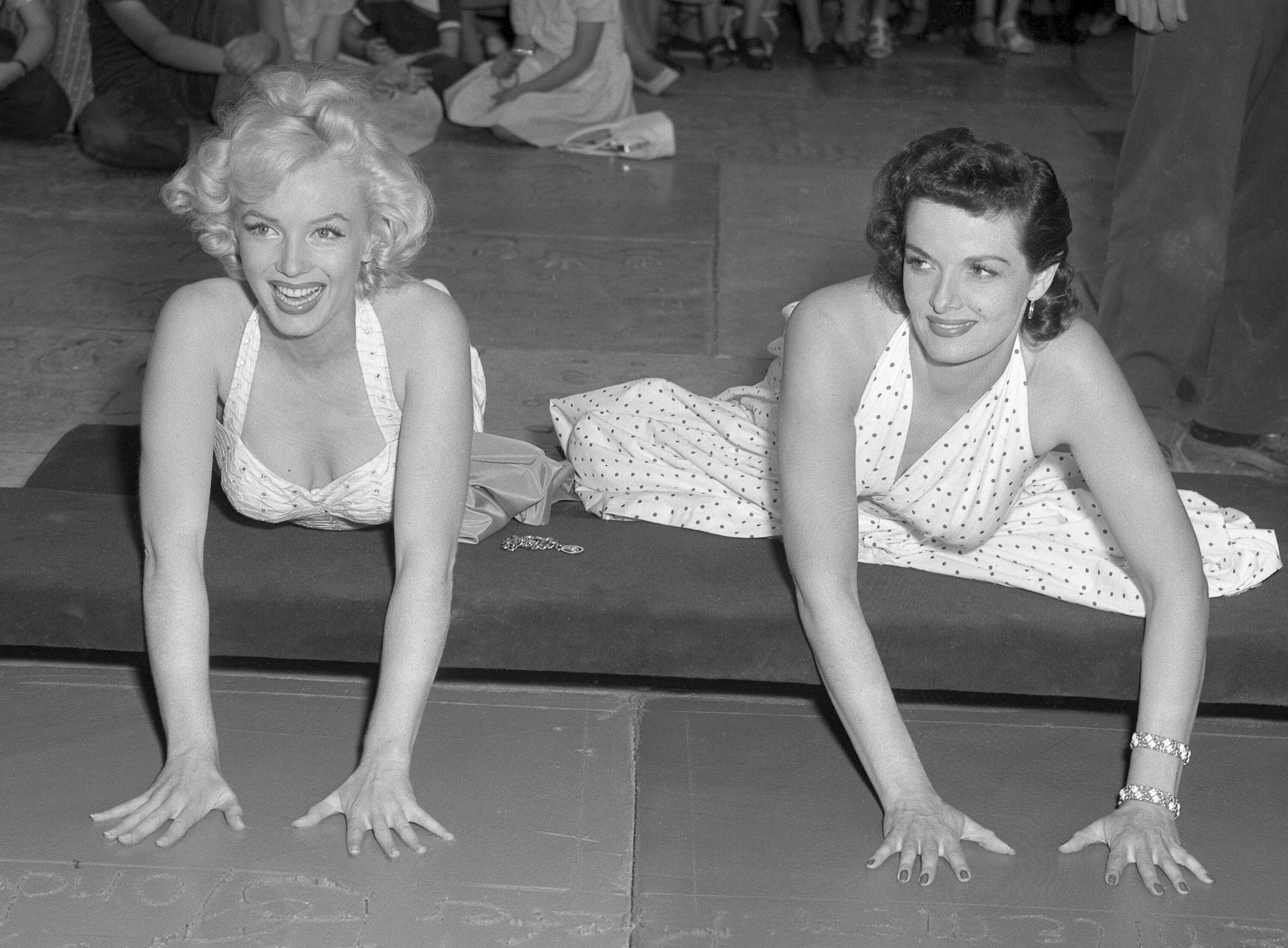
Marilyn Monroe and Jane Russell, costars in Gentlemen Prefer Blondes (1953), are pictured putting their hand prints in cement at the theater on June 27, 1953

- John Wayne (January 25, 1950)
- Lana Turner (May 24, 1950)
- Bette Davis (November 6, 1950)
- William Lundigan (December 29, 1950)
- Cary Grant (July 16, 1951)
- Susan Hayward (August 10, 1951)
- Hildegard Knef (as Hildegarde Neff) (December 13, 1951)
- Oskar Werner (December 13, 1951)
- Jane Wyman (September 17, 1952)
- Ava Gardner (October 21, 1952)
- Clifton Webb (December 7, 1952)
- Olivia de Havilland (December 9, 1952)
- Adolph Zukor (January 5, 1953)
- Ezio Pinza (January 26, 1953)
- Donald O'Connor and mother Effie (February 25, 1953)
- Marilyn Monroe and Jane Russell (June 26, 1953)
- Jean Simmons (September 24, 1953)
- Danny Thomas (January 26, 1954)
- James Mason (March 30, 1954)
- Alan Ladd (May 12, 1954)
- Edmund Purdom (August 30, 1954)
- Van Heflin (October 8, 1954)
- George Murphy (November 8, 1954)
- Yul Brynner (March 22, 1956)
- Deborah Kerr (March 22, 1956)
- Elizabeth Taylor, Rock Hudson, and George Stevens (September 26, 1956)
- Elmer C. Rhoden and Richard Bakalyan (September 16, 1958)
- Rosalind Russell (February 19, 1959)

== 1960s ==
- Cantinflas (December 28, 1960)
- Doris Day (January 19, 1961)
- Natalie Wood (December 5, 1961)
- Charlton Heston (January 18, 1962)
- Sophia Loren (July 26, 1962)
- Kirk Douglas (November 1, 1962)
- Paul Newman and Joanne Woodward (May 25, 1963)
- Jack Lemmon and Shirley MacLaine (June 29, 1963)
- Mervyn LeRoy (October 15, 1963)
- Hayley Mills (February 22, 1964)
- Dean Martin (March 21, 1964)
- Peter Sellers (June 3, 1964)
- Debbie Reynolds (January 14, 1965)
- Marcello Mastroianni (February 8, 1965)
- Frank Sinatra (July 20, 1965)
- Julie Andrews (March 26, 1966)
- Dick Van Dyke (June 25, 1966)
- Steve McQueen (March 21, 1967)
- Sidney Poitier (June 23, 1967)
- Anthony Quinn (December 21, 1968)
- Danny Kaye (October 19, 1969)
- Gene Kelly (November 24, 1969)

== 1970s ==
- Ali MacGraw (December 14, 1972)
- Jack Nicholson (June 17, 1974)
- Tom Bradley and Ted Mann (May 18, 1977)
- Herbie (July 11, 1977)
- Darth Vader (August 3, 1977)
- C-3PO (Anthony Daniels), R2-D2 (Kenny Baker) (August 3, 1977)
- George Burns (November 25, 1979)

== 1980s ==
- John Travolta (June 2, 1980)
- Burt Reynolds (September 24, 1981)
- Rhonda Fleming (September 28, 1981)
- Sylvester Stallone (June 29, 1983)
- George Lucas and Steven Spielberg (May 16, 1984)
- Donald Duck and Clarence Nash (May 21, 1984)
- Clint Eastwood (August 21, 1984)
- Mickey Rooney (February 18, 1986)
- Eddie Murphy and Hollywood's 100th Anniversary (May 14, 1987)

== 1990s ==
- Cast of Star Trek (December 5, 1991)
  - Gene Roddenberry
  - William Shatner
  - Leonard Nimoy
  - DeForest Kelley
  - James Doohan
  - Walter Koenig
  - Nichelle Nichols
  - George Takei
- Harrison Ford (June 3, 1992)
- Michael Keaton (June 15, 1992)
- Tom Cruise (June 28, 1993)
- Mel Gibson (August 23, 1993)
- Arnold Schwarzenegger (July 15, 1994)
- Meryl Streep (September 25, 1994)
- Whoopi Goldberg (February 2, 1995)
- Bruce Willis (May 18, 1995)
- Steven Seagal (July 10, 1995)
- Jim Carrey (November 1, 1995)
- Jackie Chan (January 5, 1997)
- Johnny Grant (May 13, 1997)
- Robert Zemeckis (July 8, 1997)
- Michael Douglas (September 10, 1997)
- Al Pacino (October 16, 1997)
- Denzel Washington (January 15, 1998)
- Walter Matthau (April 2, 1998)
- Warren Beatty (May 21, 1998)
- Tom Hanks (July 23, 1998)
- Danny Glover (July 7, 1998)
- Robin Williams (December 22, 1998)
- Susan Sarandon (January 11, 1999)
- William F. "Bill" Hertz (March 18, 1999)
- Ron Howard (March 23, 1999)
- Sean Connery (April 13, 1999)
- Richard Gere (July 26, 1999)
- Terry Semel and Bob Daly (September 30, 1999)

== 2000s ==
- Anthony Hopkins (January 11, 2001)
- Nicolas Cage (August 14, 2001)
- Martin Lawrence (November 19, 2001)
- John Woo (May 21, 2002)
- Morgan Freeman (June 5, 2002)
- Christopher Walken (October 8, 2004)
- Jack Valenti (December 6, 2004)
- Sherry Lansing (February 16, 2005)
- Adam Sandler (May 17, 2005)
- Johnny Depp (September 16, 2005)
- Samuel L. Jackson (January 30, 2006)
- Kevin Costner (September 6, 2006)
- Brad Pitt, George Clooney, Matt Damon, and Jerry Weintraub (June 5, 2007)
- Daniel Radcliffe, Emma Watson, and Rupert Grint (July 9, 2007)
- Will Smith (December 10, 2007)
- Michael Caine (July 11, 2008)
- Hugh Jackman (April 21, 2009)
- Robert Downey Jr. (December 7, 2009)

== 2010s ==
- Jerry Bruckheimer (May 17, 2010)
- Cher (November 18, 2010)
- Robert Duvall (January 5, 2011)
- Kobe Bryant (February 19, 2011)
- Helen Mirren (March 28, 2011)
- Peter O’Toole (April 30, 2011)
- Jennifer Aniston (July 7, 2011)
- Mickey Rourke (October 31, 2011)
- Kristen Stewart, Robert Pattinson, and Taylor Lautner (November 3, 2011)
- Rita Moreno, Russ Tamblyn, and George Chakiris (November 15, 2011)
- David Guetta (December 3, 2011)
- Michael Jackson (January 26, 2012)
- Kim Novak (April 14, 2012)
- Lee Byung-Hun and Ahn Sung-ki (June 23, 2012)
- Christopher Nolan (July 7, 2012)
- Robert De Niro (February 4, 2013)
- Jane Fonda (April 27, 2013)
- Jackie Chan (June 6, 2013)
- Jerry Maren (September 18, 2013)
- Sandra Bullock (September 25, 2013)
- Afrojack (October 5, 2013)
- Feng Xiaogang (November 1, 2013)
- Emma Thompson (November 7, 2013)
- John Goodman (November 14, 2013)
- Ben Stiller (December 3, 2013)
- Ford Mustang (December 5, 2013)
- Leo the Lion (January 22, 2014)
- Jerry Lewis (April 12, 2014)
- Mel Brooks (September 8, 2014)
- Gena Rowlands (December 5, 2014)
- Ethan Hawke (January 8, 2015)
- Vince Vaughn (March 4, 2015)
- Christopher Plummer (March 27, 2015)
- Vin Diesel (April 1, 2015)
- Dwayne Johnson (May 19, 2015)
- Justin Lin, Zhao Wei, and Huang Xiaoming (June 3, 2015)
- Katy Perry and Jeremy Scott (September 8, 2015)
- Jennifer Lawrence, Josh Hutcherson, and Liam Hemsworth (October 31, 2015)
- Quentin Tarantino (January 5, 2016)
- Francis Ford Coppola (April 29, 2016)
- Roland Emmerich (June 20, 2016)
- Tim Burton (September 8, 2016)
- Jeffrey Katzenberg (September 29, 2016)
- Jessica Chastain (November 3, 2016)
- Donnie Yen (November 30, 2016)
- Emma Stone and Ryan Gosling (December 7, 2016)
- Jeff Bridges (January 6, 2017)
- Carl and Rob Reiner (April 7, 2017)
- Ridley Scott (May 17, 2017)
- Michael Bay (May 23, 2017)
- Stan Lee (July 18, 2017)
- Tamer Hosny (August 9, 2017)
- Kenneth Branagh (October 26, 2017)
- Mariah Carey (November 1, 2017)
- Lionel Richie (March 7, 2018)
- Cicely Tyson (April 27, 2018)
- Quincy Jones (November 27, 2018)
- Pitbull (December 14, 2018)
- Sam Elliott (January 7, 2019)
- Billy Crystal (April 12, 2019)
- Robert Downey Jr., Chris Evans, Chris Hemsworth, Mark Ruffalo, Jeremy Renner, Scarlett Johansson, and Kevin Feige (April 23, 2019)
- Johnny Galecki, Jim Parsons, Kaley Cuoco, Simon Helberg, Kunal Nayyar, Mayim Bialik, and Melissa Rauch (May 1, 2019)
- Keanu Reeves (May 14, 2019)
- Kevin Smith and Jason Mewes (October 14, 2019)
- Kevin Hart (December 10, 2019)

== 2020s ==
- Patrick Stewart (January 13, 2020)
- Canelo Alvarez (March 18, 2021)
- Regina King (October 28, 2021)
- Lily Tomlin (April 22, 2022)
- The Smashing Pumpkins (May 12, 2022)
- Priscilla Presley, Lisa Marie Presley, Riley Keough, Finley Aaron Love Lockwood, and Harper Vivienne Ann Lockwood (June 21, 2022)
- Diane Keaton (August 11, 2022)
- Michael G. Wilson and Barbara Broccoli (September 21, 2022)
- Jamie Lee Curtis (October 13, 2022)
- James Cameron and Jon Landau (January 12, 2023)
- Yoshiki (September 14, 2023)
- James Hong (February 24, 2024)
- Jodie Foster (April 19, 2024)
- Carol Burnett (June 20, 2024)
- Ke Huy Quan (February 3, 2025)
- Anthony Russo & Joe Russo (February 21, 2025)
- Gabriel "Fluffy" Iglesias (March 11, 2025)
- Ice Cube (April 15, 2025)
- Michelle Pfeiffer (April 25, 2025)
- Gary Oldman (August 22, 2025)
- Jonas Brothers (December 3, 2025)
- Jo Koy (February 11, 2026)
- John Davis (February 26, 2026)
- Glenn Close (May 1, 2026)
- Sigourney Weaver (May 15, 2026)
- Javier Bardem (June 16, 2026)

== Without handprints ==
In recent years, there have been a number of ceremonies for celebrities, famous animals, and fictional characters, after which the handprints have not been placed on the forecourt. These include:

- Mighty Morphin Power Rangers (June 22, 1995)
- Snow White and the Seven Dwarfs (February 5, 2004)
- Alvin and the Chipmunks (November 1, 2011)
- The Smurfs (December 13, 2011)
- Uggie (June 25, 2012)
- Britney Spears, Simon Cowell, Demi Lovato, and L.A. Reid (September 12, 2012)
- Optimus Prime (September 30, 2014)
- Michael Madsen (November 17, 2020)
- Teenage Mutant Ninja Turtles (September 7, 2023)
- Jim Davis and Garfield (May 19, 2024)
- Spongebob SquarePants (December 16, 2025)
- Jo and Raissa (September 25, 2026)

== See also ==
- List of stars on the Hollywood Walk of Fame
