= The Russia House (film) =

1990 American film by Fred Schepisi

- Theatrical release poster
- Directed by: Fred Schepisi
- Screenplay by: Tom Stoppard
- Based on: The Russia House; 1989 novel by John le Carré
- Produced by: Paul Maslansky; Fred Schepisi
- Starring: Sean Connery; Michelle Pfeiffer; Roy Scheider; James Fox; John Mahoney; Klaus Maria Brandauer
- Cinematography: Ian Baker
- Edited by: Beth Jochem Besterveld; Peter Honess
- Music by: Jerry Goldsmith
- Production companies: Metro-Goldwyn-Mayer; Pathé Entertainment
- Distributed by: MGM-Pathé Communications
- Release date: December 21, 1990
- Running time: 122 minutes
- Country: United States
- Languages: English; Russian
- Budget: $21.8 million
- Box office: $23 million

The Russia House is a 1990 American spy film directed by Fred Schepisi and starring Sean Connery, Michelle Pfeiffer, Roy Scheider, James Fox, John Mahoney and Klaus Maria Brandauer. Tom Stoppard wrote the screenplay based on John le Carré's 1989 novel of the same name. It was the first US motion picture to be shot substantially on location in the Soviet Union.

== Plot ==
Bartholomew "Barley" Scott-Blair, head of a British publishing firm, arrives in Moscow on business in autumn 1987, at the height of perestroika. At a writers' retreat near Peredelkino, he speaks of an end to tensions with the West, heard by the mysterious Dante, who demands that Barley promise to do the right thing if the opportunity arises.

A few months later, unable to locate Barley at a trade show, a young Soviet named Katya Orlova asks publisher Nicky Landau to give Barley a manuscript. Landau sneaks a look and delivers it to British government authorities. The manuscript is a document detailing the Soviet Union's capability for waging nuclear war. An investigation reveals that Dante is renowned Soviet physicist Yakov Efraimovich Saveleyev, author of the manuscript.

British intelligence officers track Barley to his holiday flat in Lisbon and interrogate him about his ties to Katya, but realize he knows as little as they do. MI6 knows that the manuscript is also of vital importance to the CIA, with both agencies seeking Barley to work on their behalf. British agent Ned gives Barley some basic training as a spy.

Barley returns to the Soviet Union to seek out Dante and confirm he is a genuine informant. He meets with Katya and is instantly smitten. Through her, he confirms that Dante is indeed Saveleyev, and denies to Katya that he is a spy.

The British run the operation through its first phase while apprising the CIA of its results. The CIA team, headed by Russell, is concerned at the manuscript's description of the Soviet nuclear missile programme as being in complete disarray and Saveleyev’s assertion that the United States is engaged in a pointless arms race.

Katya sets up a meeting with Saveleyev, who is going to great lengths to avoid being followed. Barley explains that the manuscript is in the hands of British and American intelligence. Saveleyev, who is deeply skeptical of the authorities on both sides of the Cold War, feels betrayed. Barley, however, convinces him that the manuscript can still be published and that he is sympathetic to the physicist's cause. Persuaded, Saveleyev discreetly provides Barley with another volume of the manuscript.

Impressed by the additional volume, Russell's boss Brady and military intelligence officer Quinn interrogate Barley to be certain of his loyalties. Russell states he would help the British operation out of a true ideological belief in glasnost, although this would not be good news to his "customers" in the military industrial complex, who need an arms race for continued prosperity.

Convinced the manuscripts are genuine, the CIA and MI6 create a "shopping list" of questions to extract as much strategic warfare information as Dante can provide.

"The Russia House" handler Ned senses something is amiss with Barley, but the British-American team continues its plans.

Barley returns to the Soviet Union and declares his love to Katya, secretly admitting to her that he is a British operative. Katya confesses that Yakov is not acting like himself and fears he may be under KGB observation or control. She gives Barley Yakov's address in Moscow.

Under full British-American surveillance, Barley takes the shopping list to Yakov's apartment. Ned suddenly concludes that the Soviets know all about the operation and will steal the list to learn what the British and Americans really know, and is convinced that Barley has made a deal to turn over the questions to the KGB in exchange for travel visas for Katya and her family. Russell disagrees, and instructs the mission to proceed as planned. The meeting with Yakov is expected to be brief, but after seven hours, Russell admits he was wrong. The team must now pretend the questions were deliberately false.

Barley sends a note to Ned explaining that during a pre-arranged phone call to Katya, Saveleyev used a code word to let her know that he had been compromised by the KGB and that her life was in danger. Barley admits he traded the shopping list to the Soviets, in exchange for the release of Katya and her family to the West. He admits his actions might be unfair, but tells Ned, "You shouldn't open other people's letters."

Ned visits Barley, who has returned to his flat in Lisbon, to wait for Katya. When her ship arrives, Barley greets Katya and her family at the docks, ready to begin a new life with them.

== Cast ==
- Sean Connery as Bartholomew "Barley" Scott Blair
- Michelle Pfeiffer as Katya Orlova
- Roy Scheider as Russell
- James Fox as Ned
- John Mahoney as Brady
- Michael Kitchen as Clive
- J. T. Walsh as Colonel Jackson Quinn
- Ken Russell as Walter
- David Threlfall as Wicklow
- Klaus Maria Brandauer as Dante / Yakov Saveleyev
- Mac McDonald as Bob
- Nicholas Woodeson as Niki Landau
- Martin Clunes as Brock
- Ian McNeice as Merrydew, Embassy Representative
- Colin Stinton as Henziger

== Production ==
The Russia House was filmed from October to December 1989, mostly on location in Moscow and Leningrad. It was the first major American production to be filmed substantially in the Soviet Union. (Note: The 1988 Arnold Schwarzenegger film Red Heat had shot for four days in Moscow, primarily at Red Square, but the rest of its Moscow sequences were filmed in Budapest.) The film's opening and closing sequences were filmed on location in Lisbon, Portugal. The sequence at the safe house was shot on Bowen Island, near Vancouver, British Columbia. The remainder of the film was shot in London. The film was shot using an anamorphic process called Technovision.

== Soundtrack ==
The Russia House

Film score by Jerry Goldsmith
- Released: 11 December 1990
- Recorded: 1990
- Genre: Soundtrack
- Length: 61:34

Professional ratings
Review scores
Source	Rating
Filmtracks	link

The critically acclaimed music to The Russia House was composed and conducted by veteran composer Jerry Goldsmith. The score featured a mixture of Russian music and jazz to complement the nationalities and characteristics of the two main characters. There were four main featured soloists, with only one receiving a card on the opening titles - Branford Marsalis on soprano saxophone. Other soloists include a duduk player (an Armenian double reed instrument), pianist Mike Lang and double bassist John Patitucci.

A soundtrack album has been released twice. The first edition was released as a film tie in on 11 December 1990 through MCA Records and features 17 tracks of score (including one piece of diegetic (source) music at a running time just over 61 minutes. An expanded CD album of just under 76 minutes was released in December 2017 by Quartet Records, which was remastered by Mike Matessino featuring a number of cues not on the original MCA album, one track of three unused cues and an alternate. The booklet incorporated new comments from Mike Lang. The limited edition CD sold out within hours of release but a non-limited CD edition was issued again by Quartet Records, in August 2021.

== Reception ==
The Russia House received a score of 70% on Rotten Tomatoes based on 20 reviews.

Hal Hinson in The Washington Post wrote: "Making a picture about the political situation in a country as much in flux as the Soviet Union can be disastrous, but the post-glasnost realities here seem plausible and up to the minute. The Russia House doesn't sweep you off your feet; it works more insidiously than that, flying in under your radar. If it is like any of its characters, it's like Katya. It's reserved, careful to declare itself but full of potent surprises. It's one of the year's best films." Peter Travers in Rolling Stone wrote: "At its best, The Russia House offers a rare and enthralling spectacle: the resurrection of buried hopes." Time Out less enthusiastically wrote: "Overtaken by East-West events, and with an over-optimistic ending which sets personal against political loyalty, it's still highly enjoyable, wittily written, and beautiful to behold in places, at others somehow too glossy for its own good."

Tom Stoppard's adapted screenplay was criticised by Vincent Canby in The New York Times: "There is evidence of Mr. Stoppard's wit in the dialogue, but the lines are not easily spoken, which is not to say that they are unspeakable. They are clumsy." Roger Ebert held a similar view in the Chicago Sun-Times: "What's good are the few emotional moments that break out of the weary spy formula: Connery declaring his love for Pfeiffer, or the British and Americans getting on each other's nerves. But these flashes of energy are isolated inside a screenplay that is static and boring, that drones on lifelessly through the le Carré universe, like some kind of space probe that continues to send back random information long after its mission has been accomplished."

Sean Connery was praised for his portrayal of Barley, "bluff, incorrigible, jazz-loving... his finest performance in ages." Variety wrote: "As the flawed, unreliable publisher, Connery is in top form." Peter Travers in Rolling Stone thought he captured "the 'splendid quiet' that le Carré found in Blair." Hal Hinson in The Washington Post wrote: "This may be the most complex character Connery has ever played, and without question it's one of his richest performances. Connery shows the melancholy behind Barley's pickled charm, all the wasted years and unkept promises." Desson Howe, also in The Washington Post, wrote: "Sean Connery, like Anthony Quinn, takes a role like a vitamin pill, downs it, then goes about his bighearted business of making the part his idiosyncratic own." However, he received criticism from the New York Times, who thought that the "usually magnetic Mr. Connery... is at odds with Barley, a glib, lazy sort of man who discovers himself during this adventure. Mr. Connery goes through the movie as if driving in second gear."

Michelle Pfeiffer also garnered critical plaudits for delivering "the film's most persuasive performance... Miss Pfeiffer, sporting a credible Russian accent, brings to it a no-nonsense urgency that is missing from the rest of the movie," according to The New York Times. Desson Howe in The Washington Post wrote: "As Katya, a mother who risks her love to smuggle a document and falls for a Westerner in the process, her gestures are entirely believable, her accent (at least to one set of Western ears) is quietly perfect." Peter Travers in Rolling Stone wrote that "Pfeiffer, who gets more subtle and incisive with each film, is incandescent as Katya." Hal Hinson in The Washington Post congratulated her for portraying a rounded character: "Her triumph goes beyond her facility with the Russian accent; other actresses could have done that. She's great at playing contradictions, at being tough yet yielding, cloaked yet open, direct yet oblique. What's she's playing, we suspect, is the great Russian game of hide-and-seek. But Pfeiffer gives it a personal dimension. Katya holds herself in check, but her wariness, one senses, is as much personal as it is cultural -- the result, perhaps, of her own secret wounds. It's one of the year's most full-blooded performances." However, Pfeiffer also had her detractors. Variety thought that her "Russian accent proves very believable but she has limited notes to play." Time Out wrote that "Pfeiffer can act, but her assumption of a role for which her pouty glamour is inappropriate – a Russian office-worker seen rubbing shoulders in the bus queues – is a jarring note."

== Awards and nominations ==
Fred Schepisi was nominated for the Golden Bear at the 41st Berlin International Film Festival.

Michelle Pfeiffer was nominated for the Golden Globe Award for Best Actress - Motion Picture Drama, but lost to Kathy Bates in Misery (1990).

== Home video release ==
MGM released The Russia House on DVD on December 26, 2001.

Twilight Time released a limited-edition version of the film on Blu-ray on July 12, 2016. The release included booklet notes by Julie Kirgo, a vintage promotional documentary about the making of the film, a trailer and an isolated score (non diegetic) and source (diegetic) music track.

The film was re-released on Blu-ray by Sandpiper Pictures on June 14, 2022. Their release included the trailer. It was also a single-layer Blu-ray, whereas the previous release had contained a larger file size, on a dual-layer Blu-ray.
