= Love Field (film) =

1992 film directed by Jonathan Kaplan

- Theatrical release poster
- Directed by: Jonathan Kaplan
- Written by: Don Roos
- Produced by: Sarah Pillsbury; Midge Sanford
- Starring: Michelle Pfeiffer; Dennis Haysbert; Brian Kerwin
- Cinematography: Ralf Bode
- Edited by: Jane Kurson
- Music by: Jerry Goldsmith
- Distributed by: Orion Pictures (United States); Columbia TriStar Film Distributors International (international)
- Release date: December 11, 1992
- Running time: 102 minutes
- Country: United States
- Language: English
- Budget: $18 million
- Box office: $1 million

Love Field is a 1992 American drama film written by Don Roos and directed by Jonathan Kaplan, starring Michelle Pfeiffer and Dennis Haysbert. It was released in the United States on December 11, 1992, by Orion Pictures. It is an example of a representation of the assassination of John F. Kennedy in popular culture. For her performance, Pfeiffer earned an Academy Award for Best Actress nomination.

== Plot ==
On November 22, 1963, Dallas housewife Lurene Hallett is obsessed with First Lady Jacqueline Kennedy. Lurene feels a special connection with Jackie through her own loss of a child after Jackie's loss. Knowing that President John F. Kennedy and his wife will be visiting Dallas, Lurene travels to Dallas Love Field to try to catch a glimpse of the couple as they arrive by plane. Lurene just misses shaking Jackie's hand. Shortly afterward, she learns that the President has been assassinated. Lurene leaves her car in the street and rushes to watch the news through a store window. Lurene's anguish over Kennedy's death reflects the collective grief of the nation over this tragedy. She is determined to attend Kennedy's burial although her overbearing husband Ray vetoes the plan.

A defiant Lurene leaves Ray a note, indicating she will be staying at the motel where they spent their honeymoon in Washington, D.C., intending to travel by bus to attend the funeral. During the bus journey, she befriends Jonell, the young Black daughter of Paul Cater. After the bus has an accident, Lurene takes Jonell to the restroom and notices old wounds on Jonell's body. Sensing something is wrong, Lurene asks Jonell whether Paul is her father, and the child replies that he is not. Lurene calls the FBI to report a kidnapping. Moments after her well-intentioned interference, Paul explains that Jonell's wounds are from an orphanage where she was taken after her mother's death. He is indeed her father, who rescued Jonell, without permission, from the Texas orphanage where she was being abused. Jonell does not remember him because he never married her mother, but he shows Lurene pictures of himself, Jonnell's mother, and Jonell as a baby. Paul must now elude the authorities until he can reach Pennsylvania and fight for custody on his home turf.

Paul and Jonell must now leave the bus. While Lurene watches Jonell, Paul steals a car from a repair shop to continue their journey. Lurene misses the bus and joins them in the car on an increasingly difficult road trip across America. Meanwhile, the FBI believes that Lurene has been kidnapped by Paul and informs Ray.

The car breaks down near Tazewell, Virginia, where local rednecks spot the white woman travelling with a Black man and beat him severely. Lurene recalls that the parents of Hazel Enright, a work associate, live in Tazewell, and seeks help there. They tend to Paul's wounds and spend the night there, with Paul and Lurene sharing a furtive one-night sexual encounter. The next morning, Mrs. Enright's disapproval of Lurene's extramarital interracial relationship reminds Lurene that she is complicating the journey, and she offers to let Paul and Jonell go on without her, but Paul wants her to continue with them. The Enrights lend them their car.

In Washington DC, on the day of the Kennedy funeral, Ray is waiting for Lurene at the motel. Lurene prefers to deal with Ray alone, leaving Paul and Jonell in the car. Ray argues with Lurene, and the argument turns violent. Paul intervenes, pretending to be the motel manager. Ray figures out that Lurene is allied with Paul and pulls a gun, but Paul wrestles the gun from him. Lurene and Paul manage to get back unscathed to the car with Jonell and leave, but Ray notes the car and license. The police eventually catch the pair, and Paul is sentenced to a year in jail for theft of the car he stole from the repair shop.

In 1964, (Note: The year is indicated by the shot of a Lyndon Johnson-Hubert Humphrey campaign poster attached to a tree.) Lurene visits Jonell in a foster home where Lurene has been visiting Jonell regularly. Lurene explains to Jonell that her father is coming back to take her home later that day. As Lurene leaves the group home, Paul arrives to pick up Jonell. They stop to talk, and Lurene informs Paul that she and Ray are divorced. Paul and Lurene hug, and both declare that they have no regrets. Lurene drives away; however, she turns her car around and rushes back into the group home to join Paul and Jonell.

== Cast ==
- Michelle Pfeiffer as Louise Irene "Lurene" Hallett
- Dennis Haysbert as Paul Cater
- Stephanie McFadden as Jonell Carter, Paul's daughter
- Brian Kerwin as Ray Hallett, Lurene's husband
- Louise Latham as Mrs. Enright, Hazel's mother
- Peggy Rea as Mrs. Heisenbuttal, Lurene's neighbor
- Beth Grant as Hazel Enright, Lurene's boss
- Cooper Huckabee as Deputy Swinson
- Troy Evans as Lieutenant Galvan
- Mark Miller as Trooper Exley
- Pearl Jones as Mrs. Baker
- Rhoda Griffis as Jacqueline Kennedy
- Bob Gill as John F. Kennedy
- Nick Searcy as FBI Man
- Joe Maggard as Redneck

== Production ==
The film was partially filmed on location in Rocky Mount and Wilson, North Carolina, United States. Denzel Washington was attached to the role of Paul Cater but dropped out. Eriq La Salle took over the role and filmed for multiple days, but producers cited he looked too young compared to Pfeiffer, so he was replaced by Dennis Haysbert. The character of Lurene Hallett was based on screenwriter Don Roos' mother.

== Depictions of racism ==
Racism is prevalent throughout the film, as well as displays of discontent from the black community concerning Kennedy's efforts to improve race relations. Despite the efforts of the filmmakers to include the black perspective during this era, one critic complains that the black characters function "merely as analogies of oppression." Criticism aside, it is realistic in its portrayals of violence against Paul by white men, by Lurene, and by her husband, Ray. Historically, it relates to findings of the Kerner Commission from 1968. This commission found that "Our nation is moving toward two societies, one black, one white, separate and unequal." Love Field shows differing opinions about Kennedy in the white and black communities, represented respectively by Lurene and Paul, specifically through Lurene's naïve point of view. For example, in one interaction between Mrs. Enright and Paul, she states, "I don't know when we started killing people to solve things," and he responds, "I didn't know we stopped."

== Reception ==
Although the film was made in 1990, Orion Pictures suffered crippling financial losses and filed for bankruptcy. It was not released until December 1992, in time for Oscar consideration.

=== Release ===
The film was released on December 11, 1992, and grossed $1,949,148 in the United States.

=== Critical response ===
On Rotten Tomatoes, the film has an approval rating of 40% based on reviews from 10 critics, with an average rating of 5.7/10.

Janet Maslin in The New York Times wrote: "This modest film actually covers a lot of ground... Love Field brings remarkably few preconceptions to the telling of its understated story. The characters transcend stereotypes, but what really matters is the actors' ability to breathe these people to life." Time Out was similarly positive, writing: "This affecting romantic comedy probes the gradations of racial prejudice still prevalent in the South despite JFK's best efforts... unaccountably denied a theatrical release in Britain, this is a most impressive and enjoyable work." On the negative side, Variety described it as "a sincere, not fully realized 1960s drama that is yet another variation on the 'Where were you when you heard JFK was shot?' theme." Hal Hinson in The Washington Post thought that "the interracial love affair that develops between this oddly matched pair never makes much sense." Roger Ebert in the Chicago Sun-Times wrote that "the essential truth of the characters was being undercut by all the manufactured gimmicks of the plot."

Critical consensus held that the primary reason to see the film was the Oscar-nominated performance of Michelle Pfeiffer. The New York Times wrote that a "character this flamboyant would risk sinking any film. But Ms. Pfeiffer, again demonstrating that she is as subtle and surprising as she is beautiful, plays Lurene with remarkable grace." The Washington Post called the characterization "a marvel, but by now that is only to be expected. Watching her [Pfeiffer] discover new facets of her talent is one of the real pleasures of going to the movies these days. Done up with a '60s platinum bouffant and butterfly fake eyelashes, Pfeiffer plays Lurene as a big-hearted, motor-mouth ditz. But, even in the movie's earliest scenes, Pfeiffer suggests that Lurene has hidden depth; not unrevealed smarts, really, but innate decency and guilelessness... She's fully alive up there on the screen: a grounded angel, tarnished, funny and exquisitely soulful, even when the movie is dead." Desson Howe wrote: "there is strong reason to watch Love Field simply for Pfeiffer. As the nobly oppressed father (a sort of clichéd, Sidney Poitier role), Haysbert is respectable and doe-eyed McFadden makes a fetching innocent. But Pfeiffer is the movie's sole engine. Tucking away her gratuitous beauty behind pancake makeup and that blonde hay-er, she's in effortless, sassy command." Peter Travers in Rolling Stone was of the opinion that "Pfeiffer overcomes the poky direction of Jonathan Kaplan (The Accused) and the unfocused script by Don Roos (of Single White Female infamy). She weaves magic in a portrayal of striking grace notes... long after Love Field hits a dead end, Pfeiffer cuts a path to the heart." Time Out called it a "marvellously touching, funny and credible performance," while for Variety it was "yet another memorable characterization." Roger Ebert congratulated her for a performance "which takes a woman who could have become a comic target and invests her with a certain dignity." Stephen Farber in Movieline wrote: "As Lurene Hallett, a dreamy beautician obsessed with Jackie Kennedy, Pfeiffer confirms her growing range and power. Her skill with accents is beginning to rival Meryl Streep's, but even more impressive than her technical virtuosity is her emotional depth; she highlights the childlike romanticism and generosity of this simple woman." Gene Siskel on "If We Picked The Oscars" (1993) chose Pfeiffer's performance as the "Worst Nomination of the Year", claiming her southern accent was unconvincingly "broad" and "couldn't hide her own intelligence from me on screen" in order to make the character believable.

=== Awards and nominations ===
Award	Category	Nominee	Result	Ref.
Academy Awards	Best Actress	Michelle Pfeiffer	Nominated	
Berlin International Film Festival	Golden Bear	Jonathan Kaplan	Nominated	
Berlin International Film Festival	Best Actress	Michelle Pfeiffer	Won	
Golden Globe Awards	Best Actress in a Motion Picture – Drama	Michelle Pfeiffer	Nominated	
New York Film Critics Circle Awards	Best Actress	Michelle Pfeiffer	3rd Place	
