= Golden Globe Award for Best Actress in a Motion Picture – Drama =

Film award presented by the Hollywood Foreign Press Association

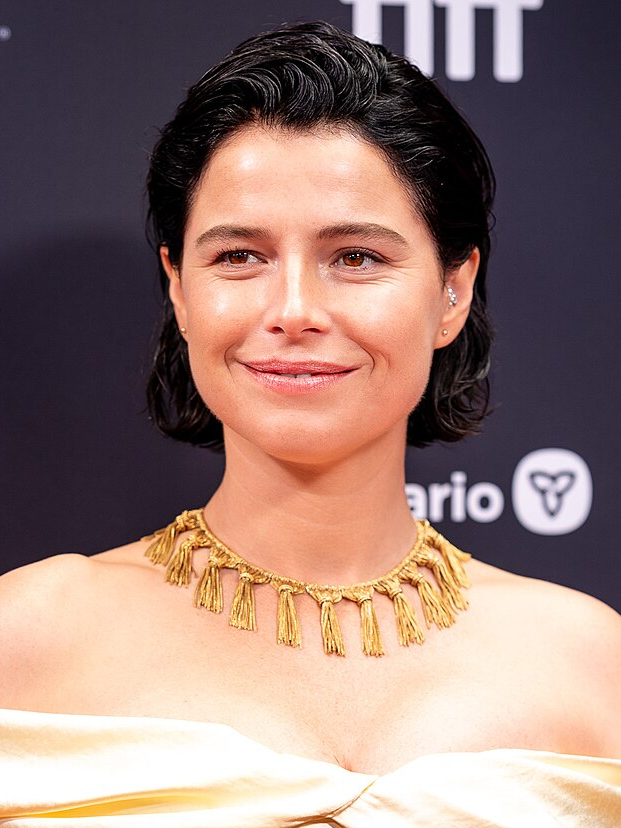
- The 2025 recipient: Jessie Buckley
- Awarded for: Best Performance by a Leading Actress in a Motion Picture - Drama
- Location: United States
- Presented by: Dick Clark Productions
- Currently held by: Jessie Buckley for Hamnet (2025)
- Website: goldenglobes.com

The Golden Globe Award for Best Actress in a Motion Picture – Drama is a Golden Globe Award that was first awarded by the Hollywood Foreign Press Association as a separate category in 1951. Previously, there was a single award for "Best Actress in a Motion Picture", but the splitting allowed for recognition of it and the Best Actress – Comedy or Musical.

The formal title has varied since its inception. In 2005, it was officially called "Best Performance by an Actress in a Motion Picture – Drama". As of 2013, the wording is "Best Actress in a Motion Picture – Drama".

== Winners and nominees ==
indicates the winner

† Indicates the Academy Award winner

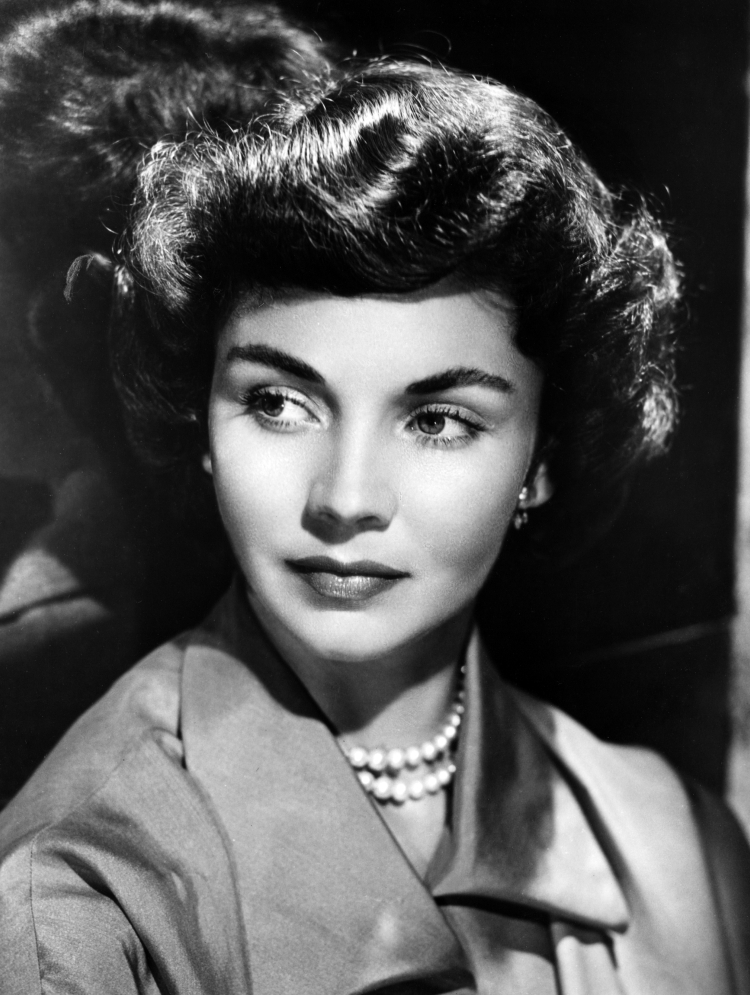
Jennifer Jones is the first winner in the category for The Song of Bernadette (1943).

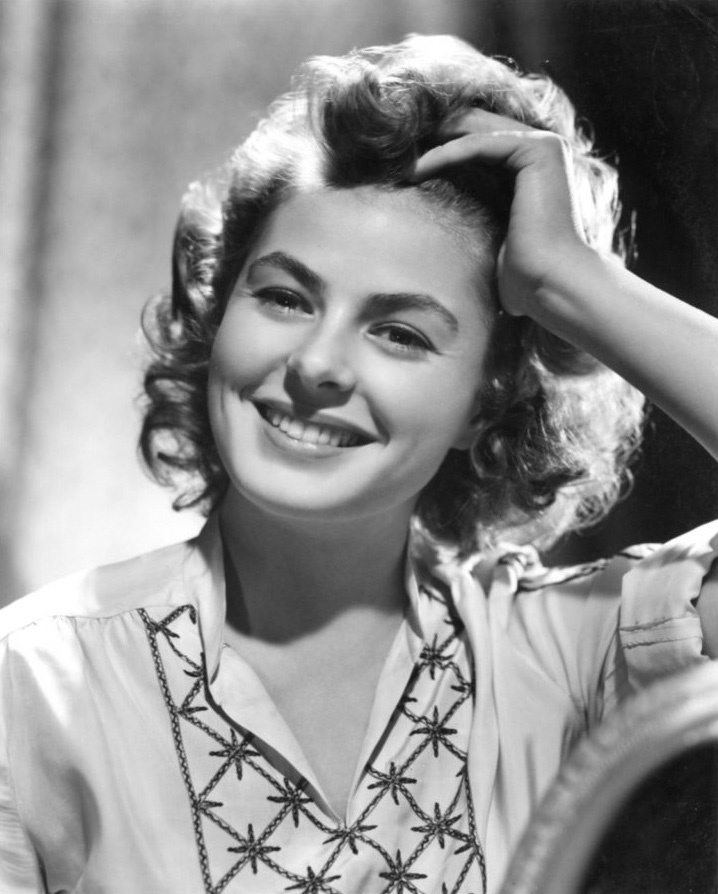
Ingrid Bergman won three times for Gaslight (1944), The Bells of St. Mary's (1945), and Anastasia (1956).

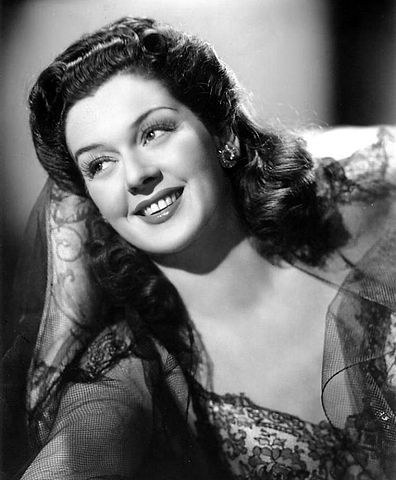
Rosalind Russell won twice consecutively for Sister Kenny (1946) and Mourning Becomes Electra (1947).

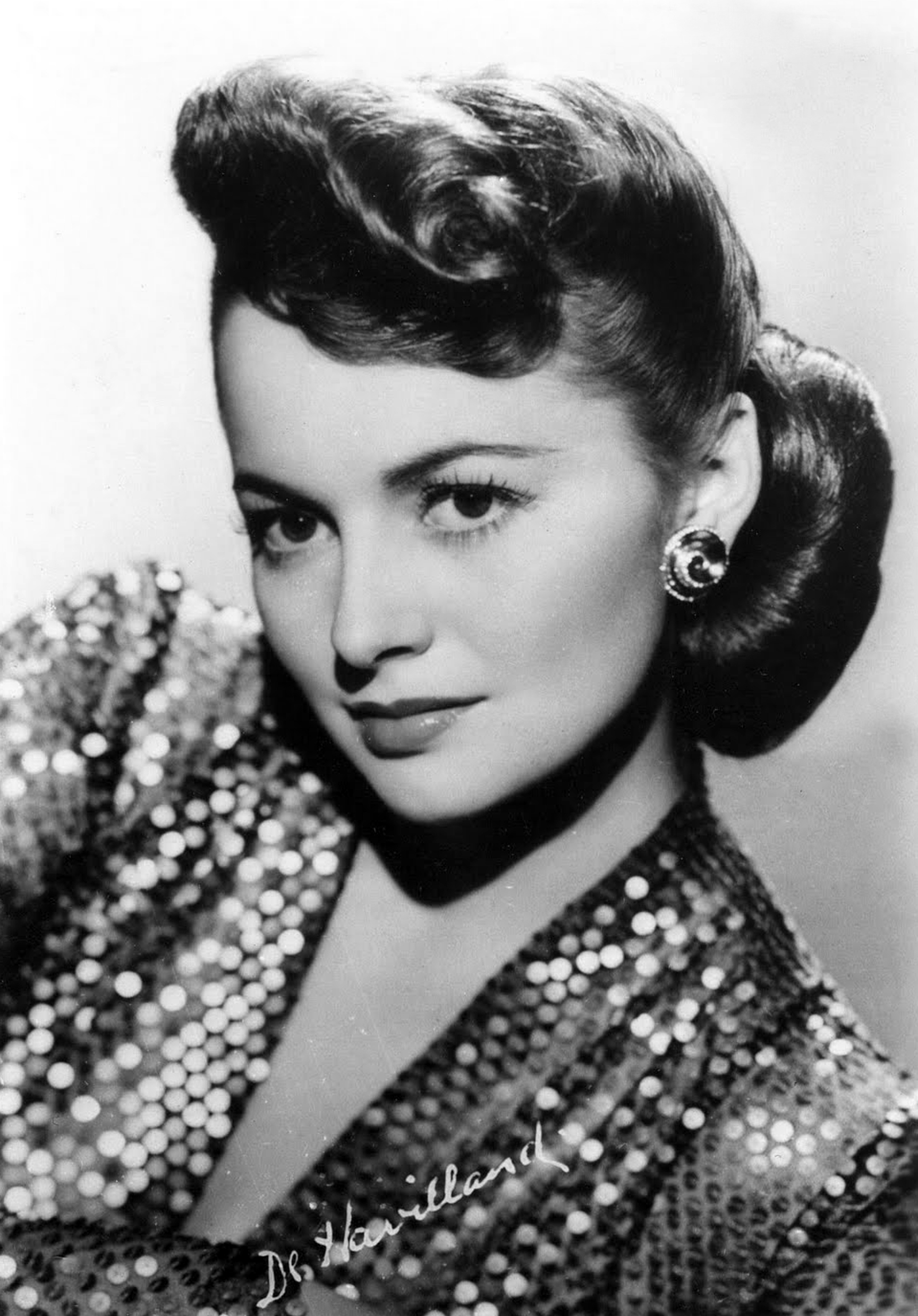
Olivia de Havilland won for The Heiress (1949).

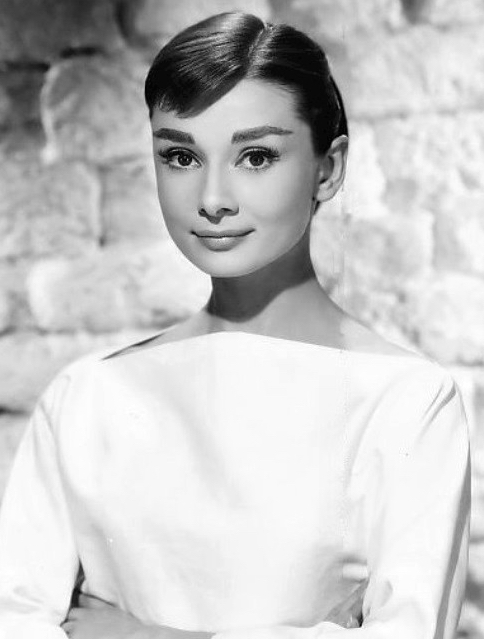
Audrey Hepburn won for Roman Holiday (1953).

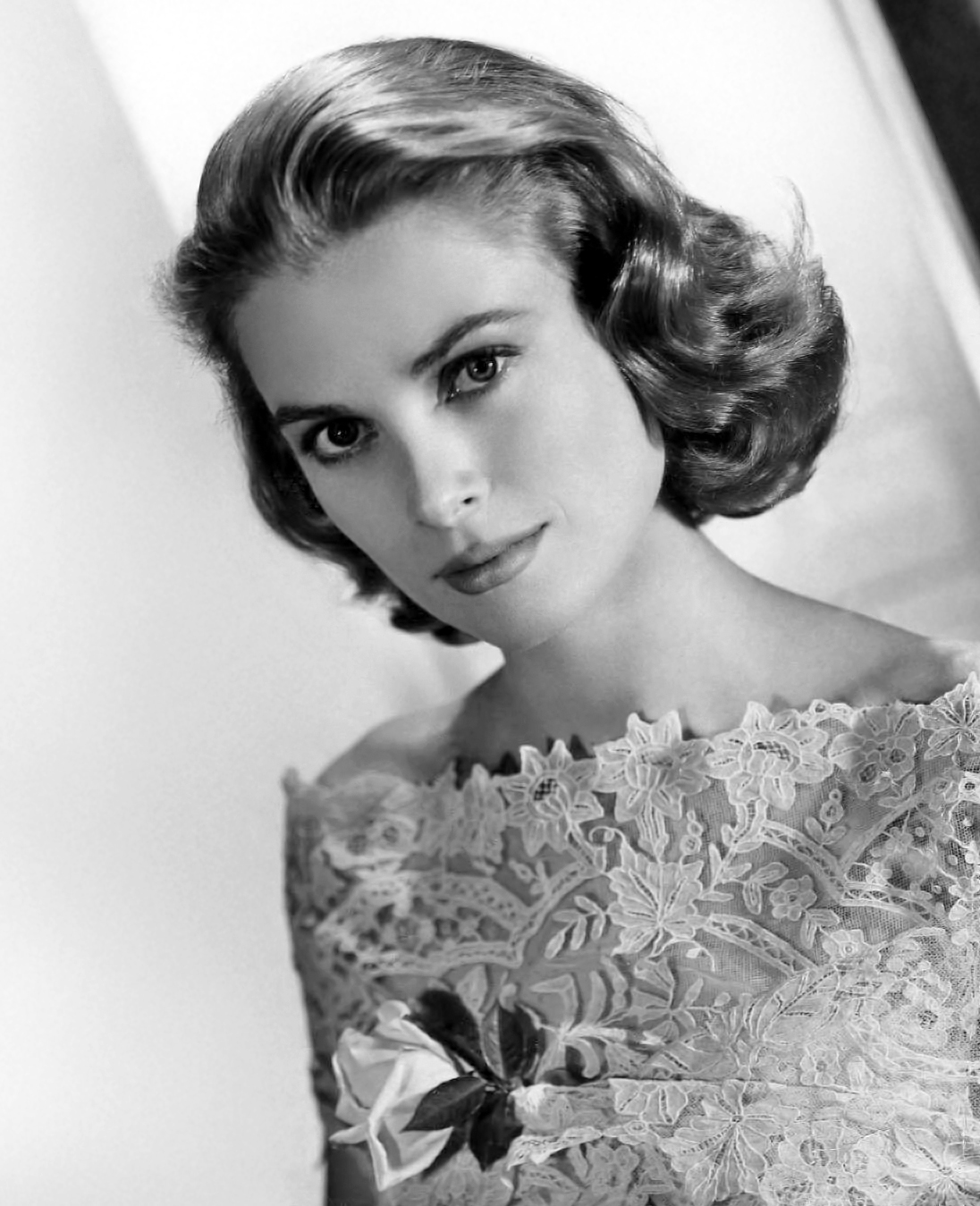
Grace Kelly won for The Country Girl (1954).

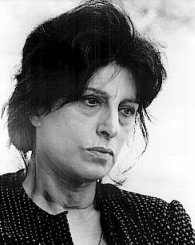
Anna Magnani was the first Italian woman to win.

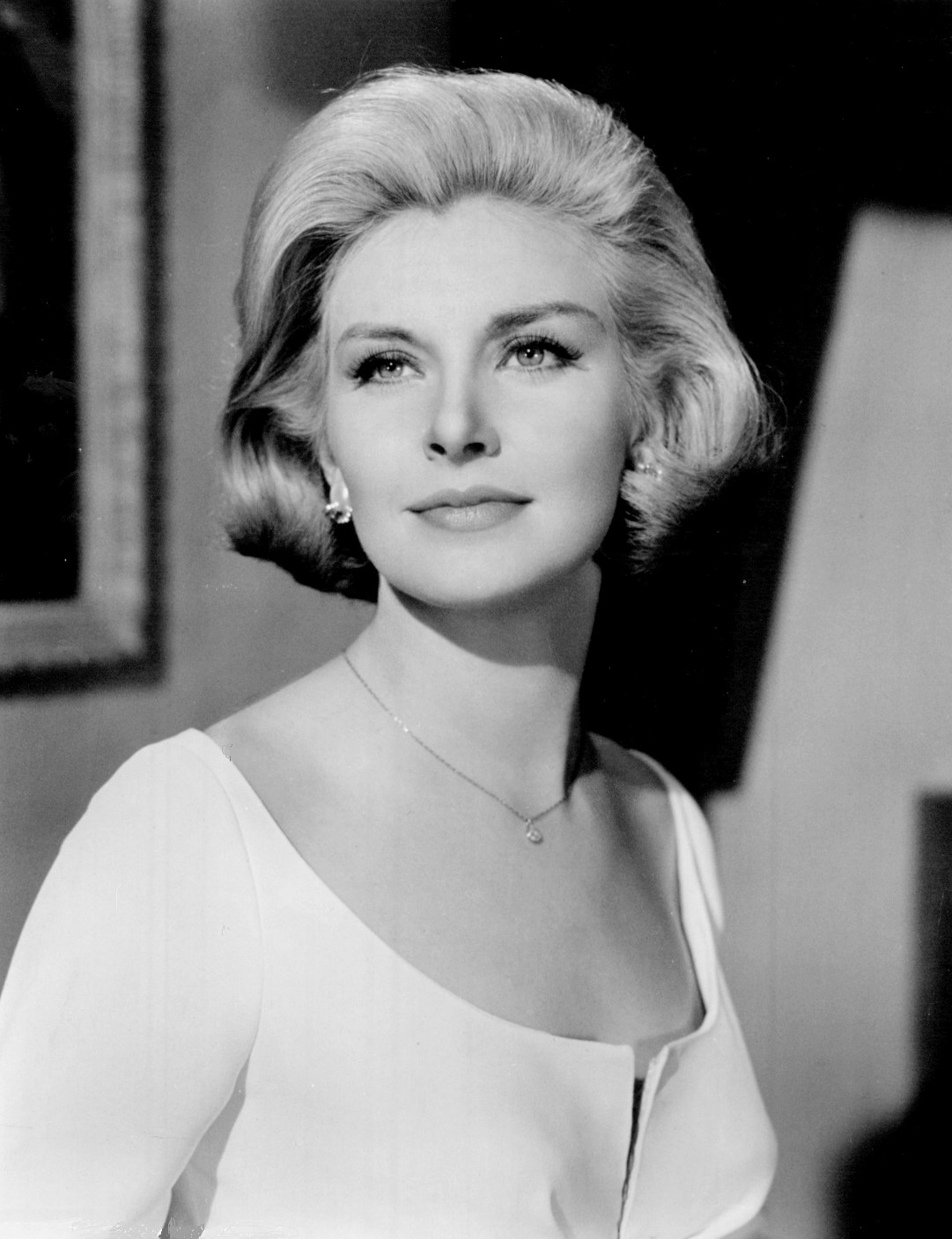
Joanne Woodward won twice for The Three Faces of Eve (1957) and Rachel, Rachel (1968).

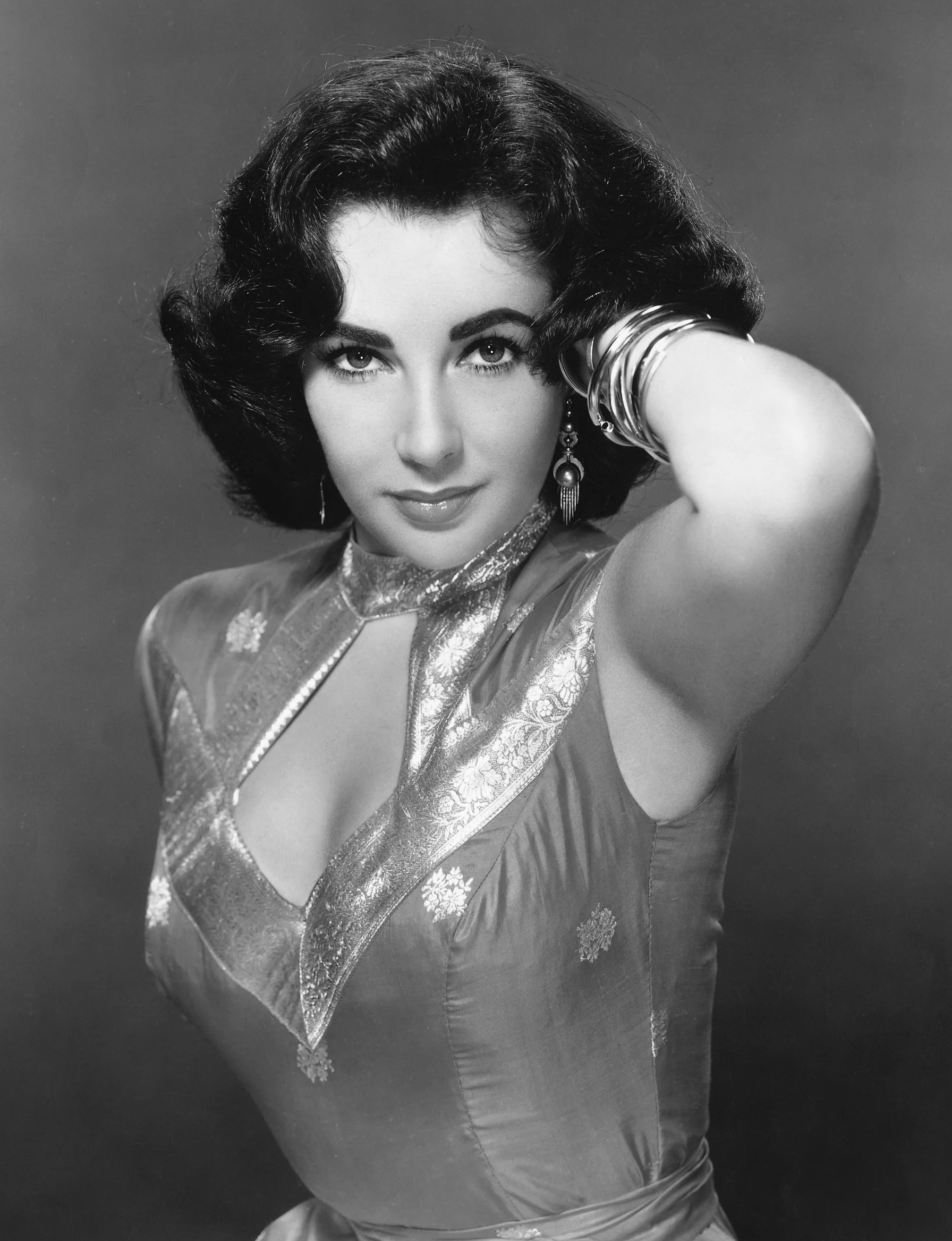
Elizabeth Taylor won for Suddenly, Last Summer (1959).

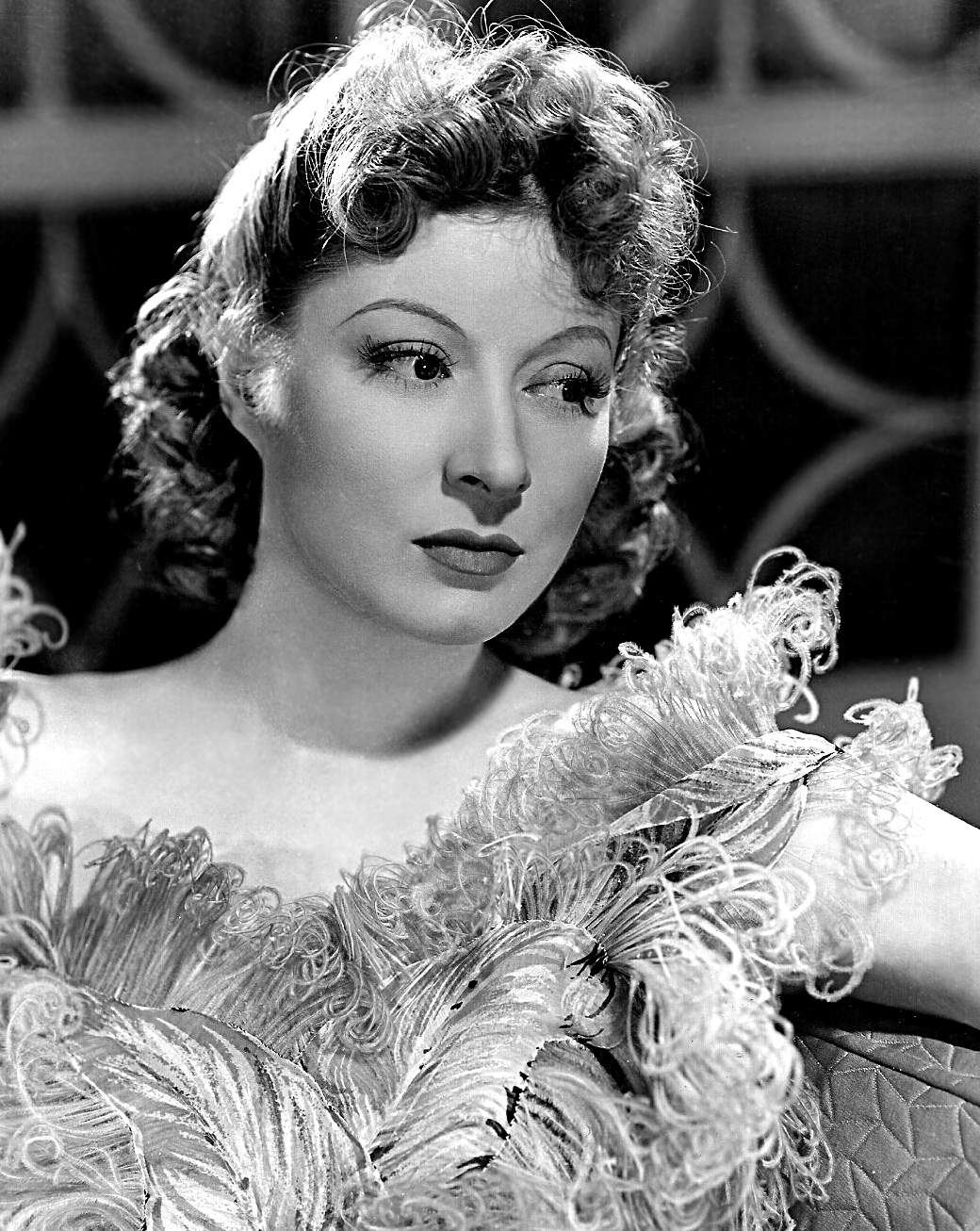
Greer Garson won for Sunrise at Campobello (1960).

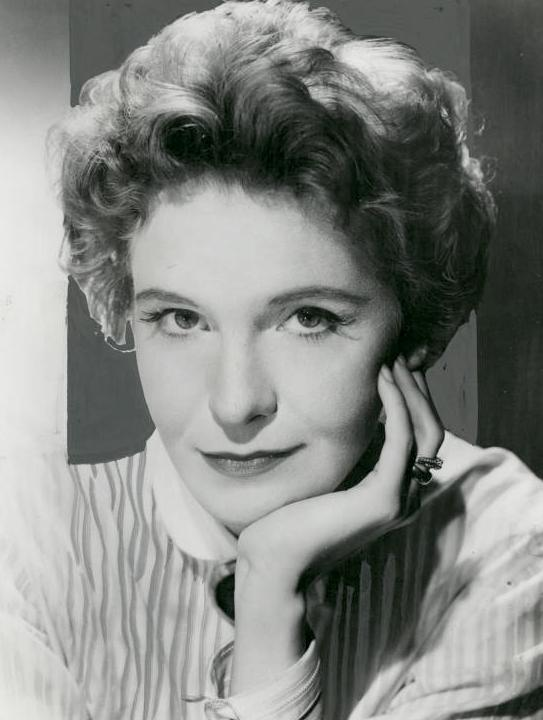
Geraldine Page won twice for Summer and Smoke (1961) and Sweet Bird of Youth (1962).

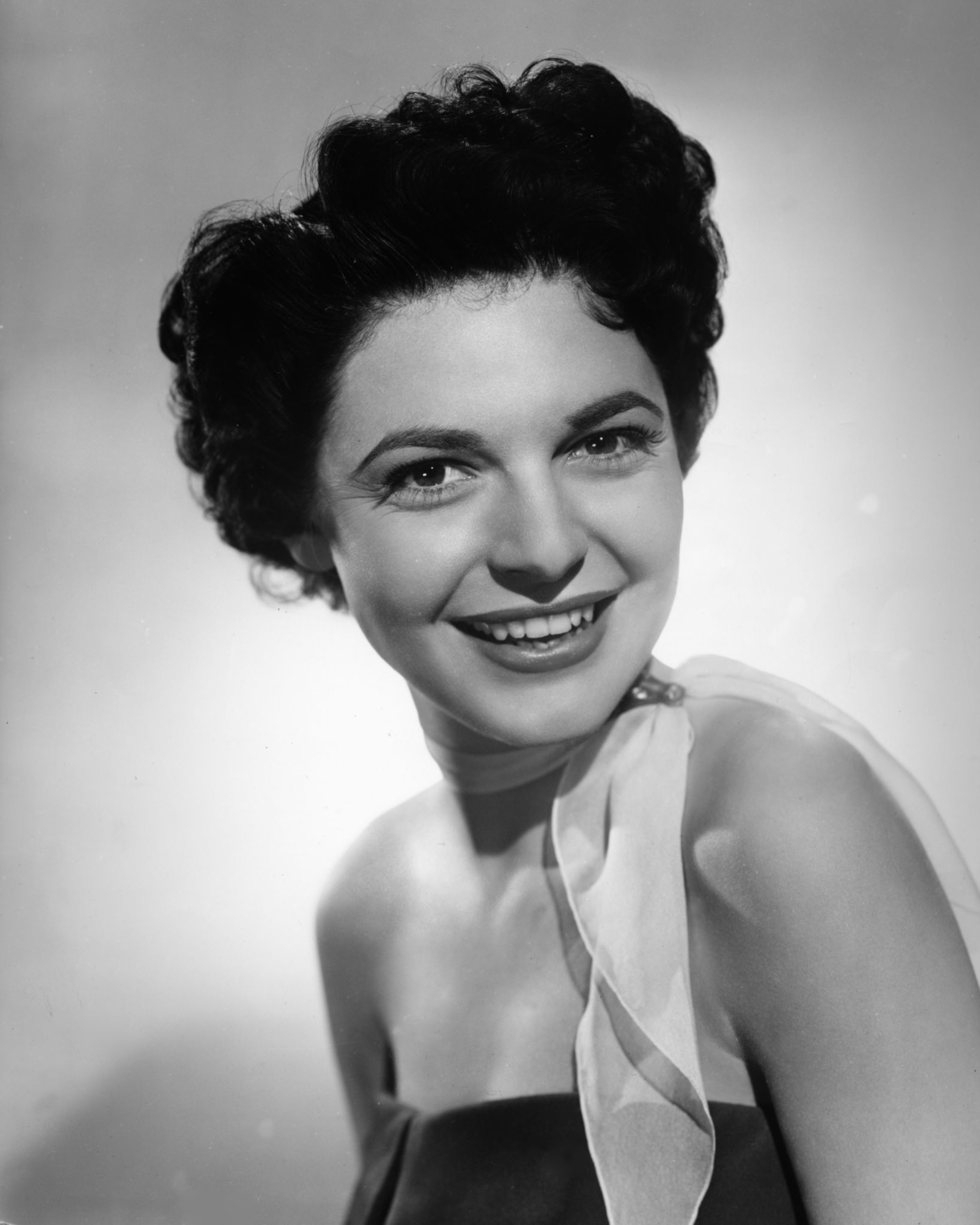
Anne Bancroft won for The Pumpkin Eater (1964).

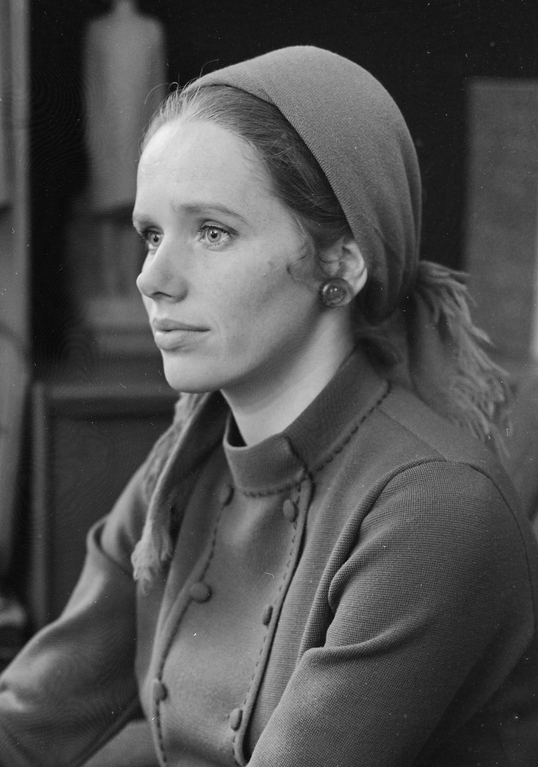
Liv Ullmann won for The Emigrants (1972).

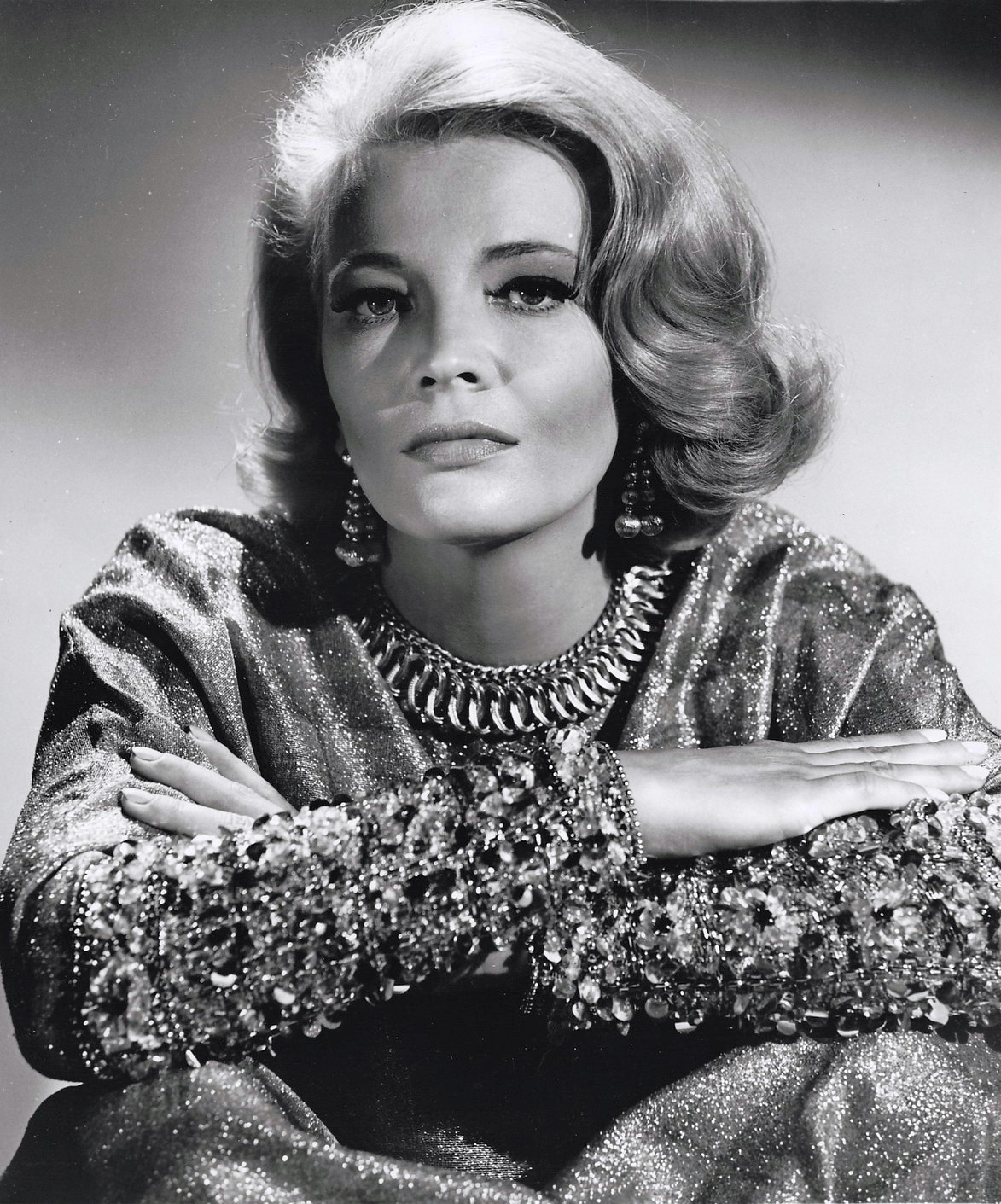
Gena Rowlands won for A Woman Under the Influence (1974).

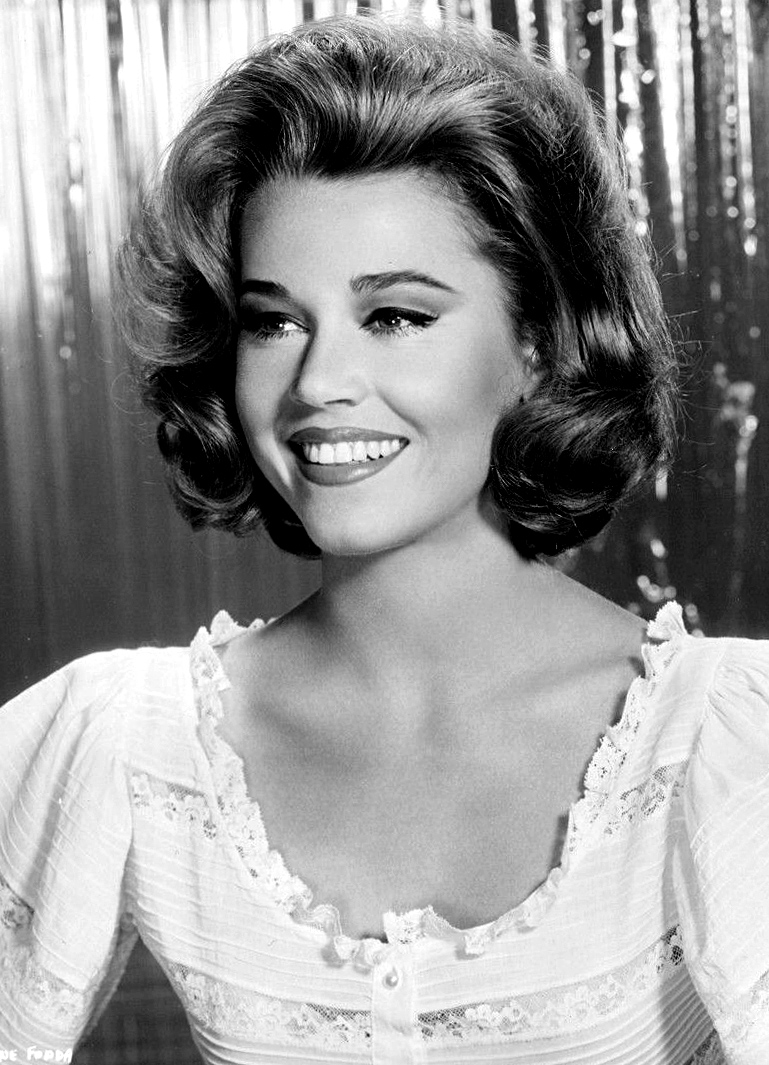
Jane Fonda won thrice for Klute (1971), Julia (1977), and Coming Home (1978).

Sally Field won twice for Norma Rae (1979) and Places in the Heart (1984).

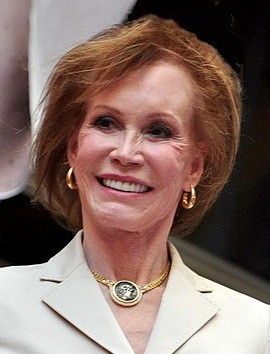
Mary Tyler Moore Won for Ordinary People (1980)

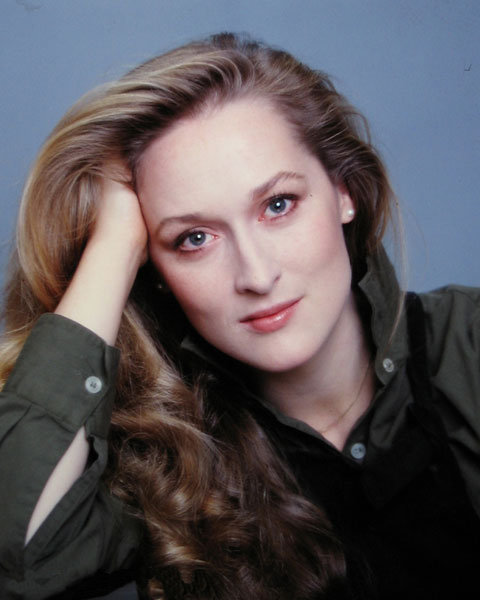
Meryl Streep won thrice for The French Lieutenant's Woman (1981), Sophie's Choice (1982), and The Iron Lady (2011). (Note: She has been nominated a record 14 times)

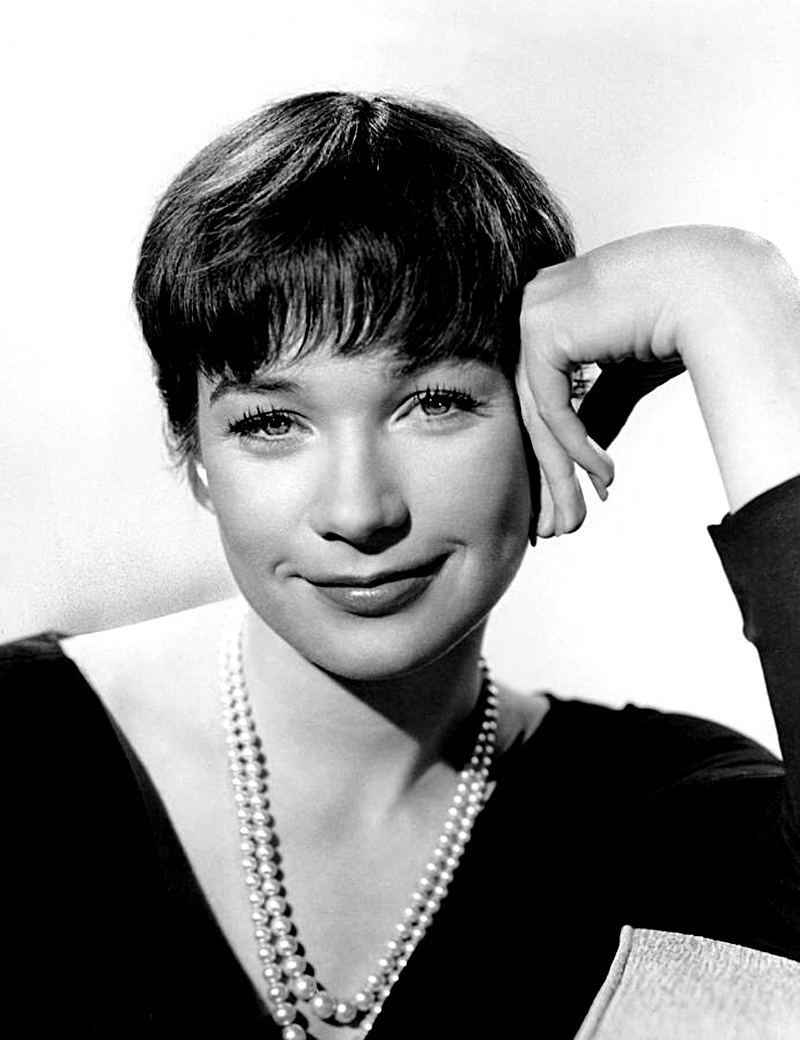
Shirley MacLaine won twice for Terms of Endearment (1983) and Madame Sousatzka (1988).

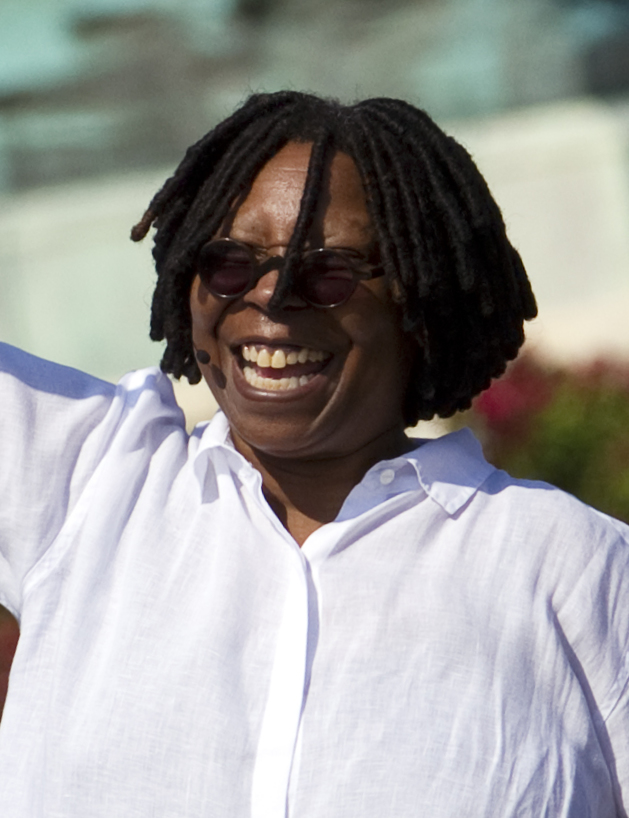
Whoopi Goldberg won for The Color Purple (1985).

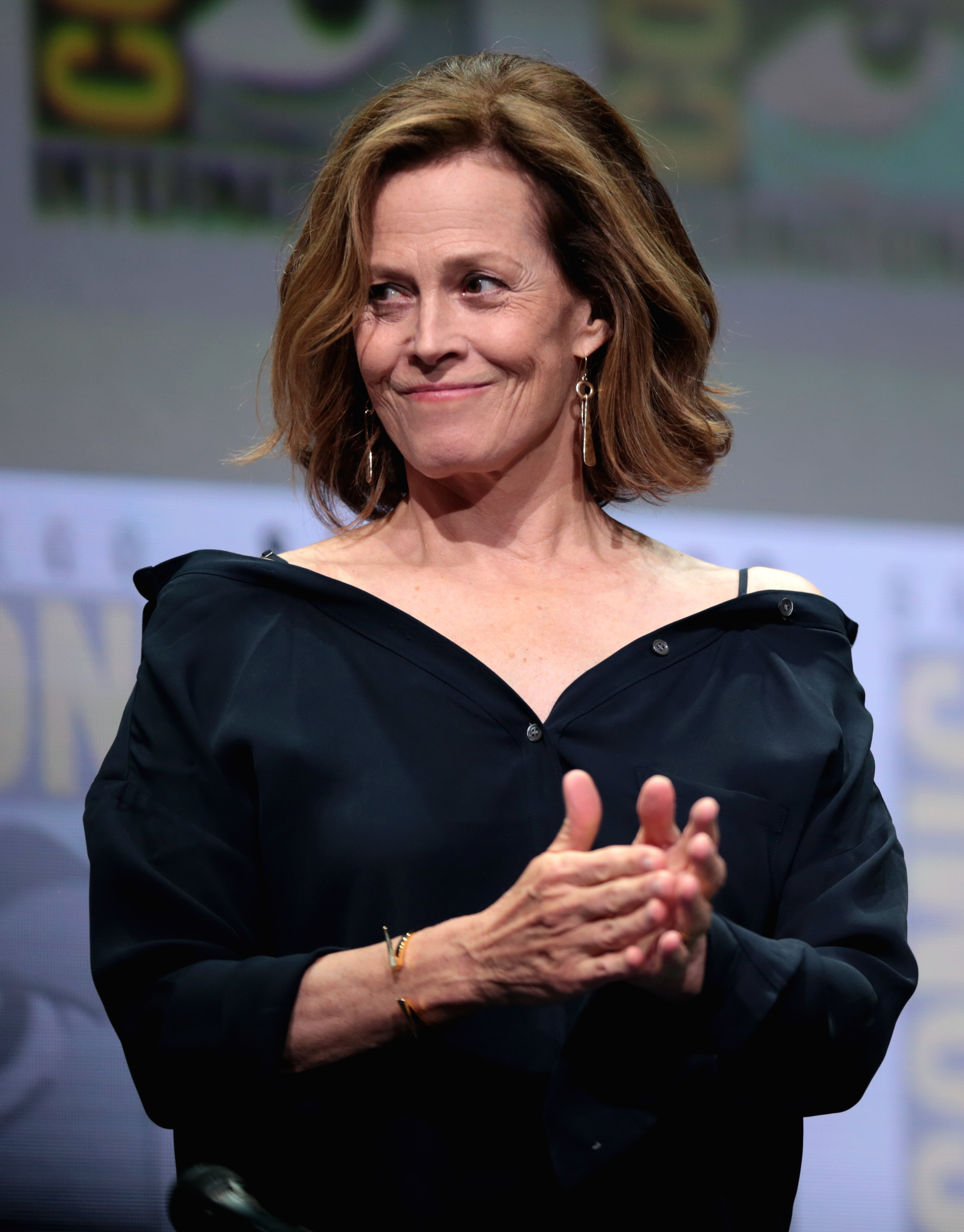
Sigourney Weaver won for Gorillas in the Mist (1988).

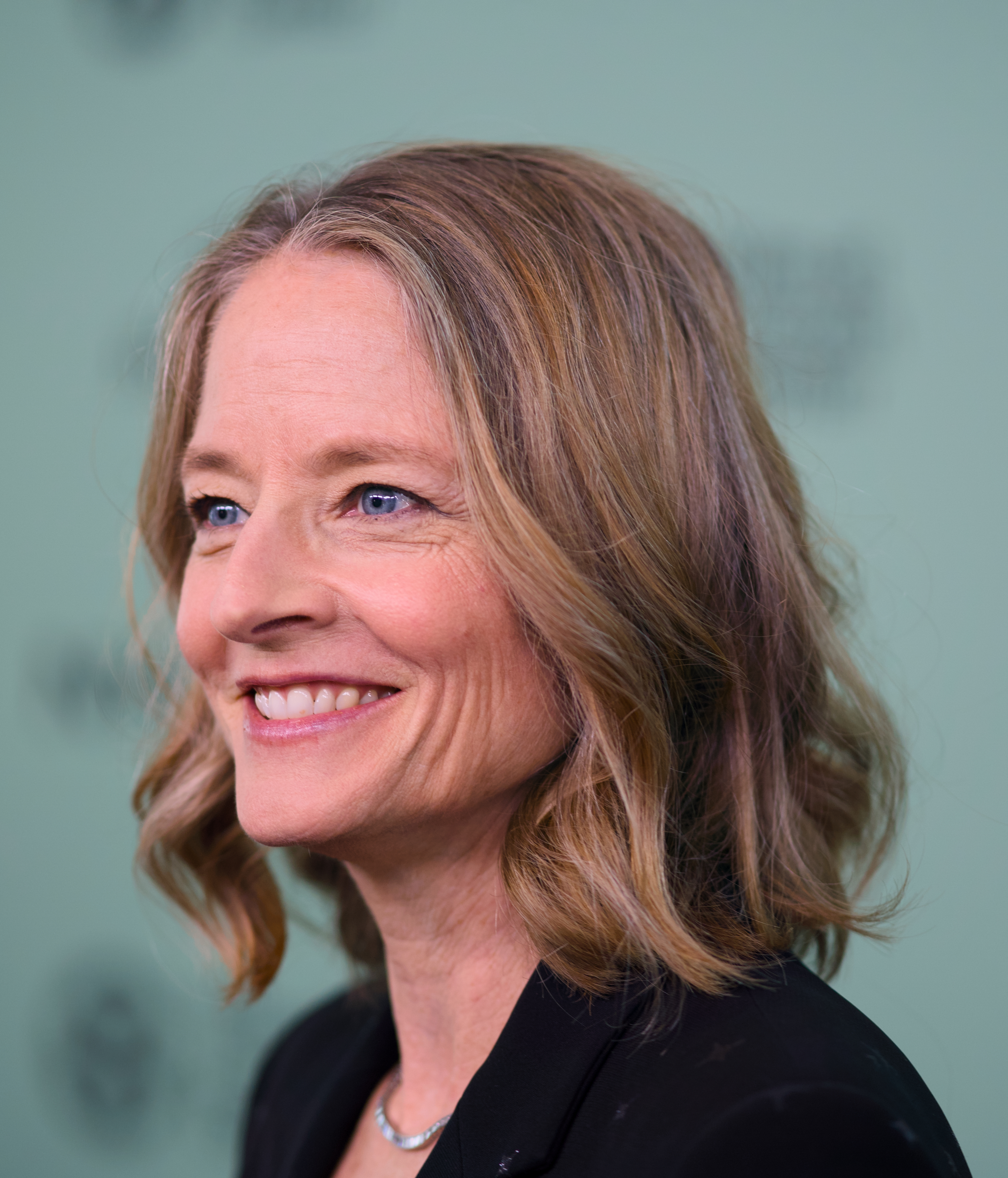
Jodie Foster won twice for The Accused (1988) and The Silence of the Lambs (1991).

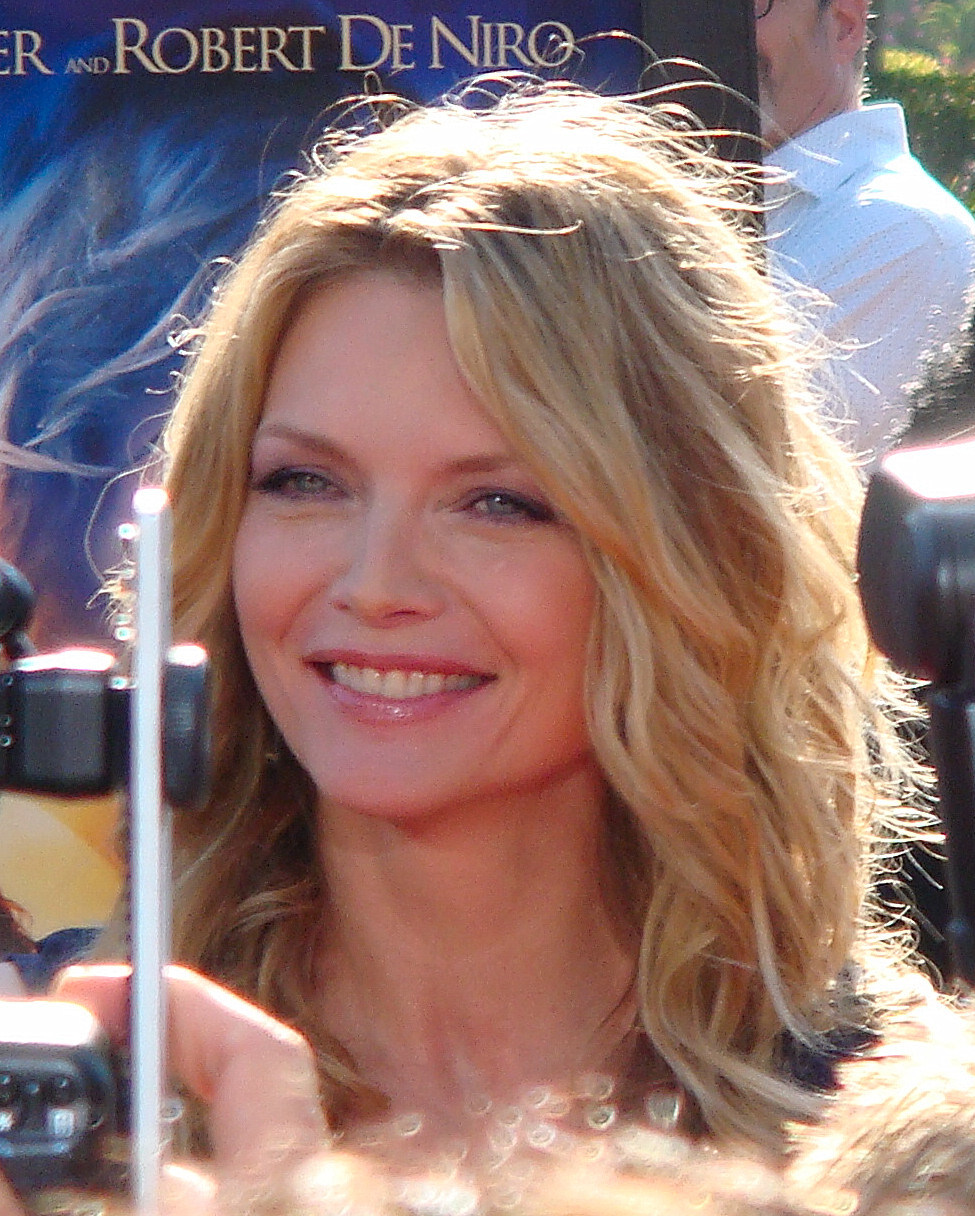
Michelle Pfeiffer won for The Fabulous Baker Boys (1989).

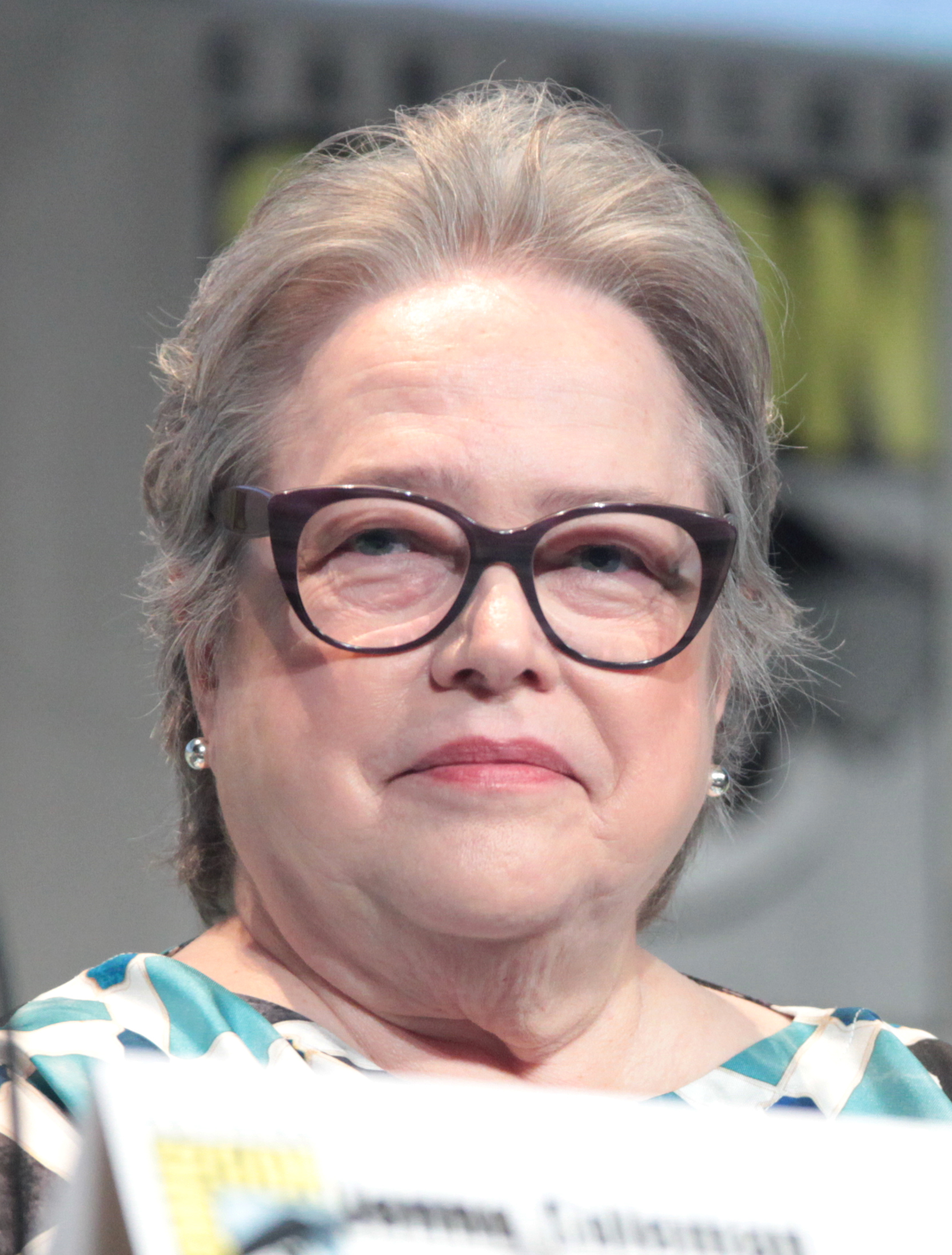
Kathy Bates won for Misery (1990).

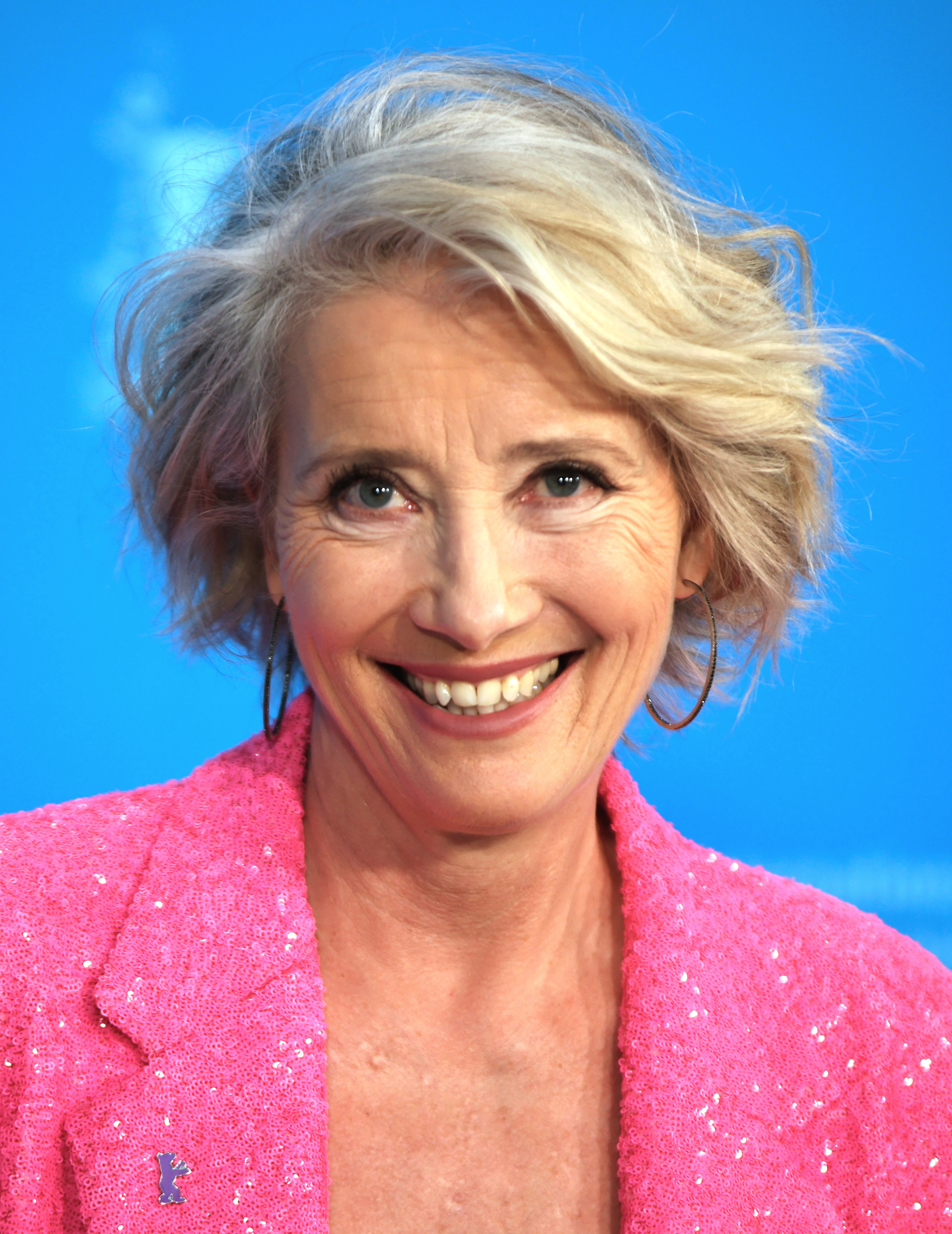
Emma Thompson won for Howards End (1992).

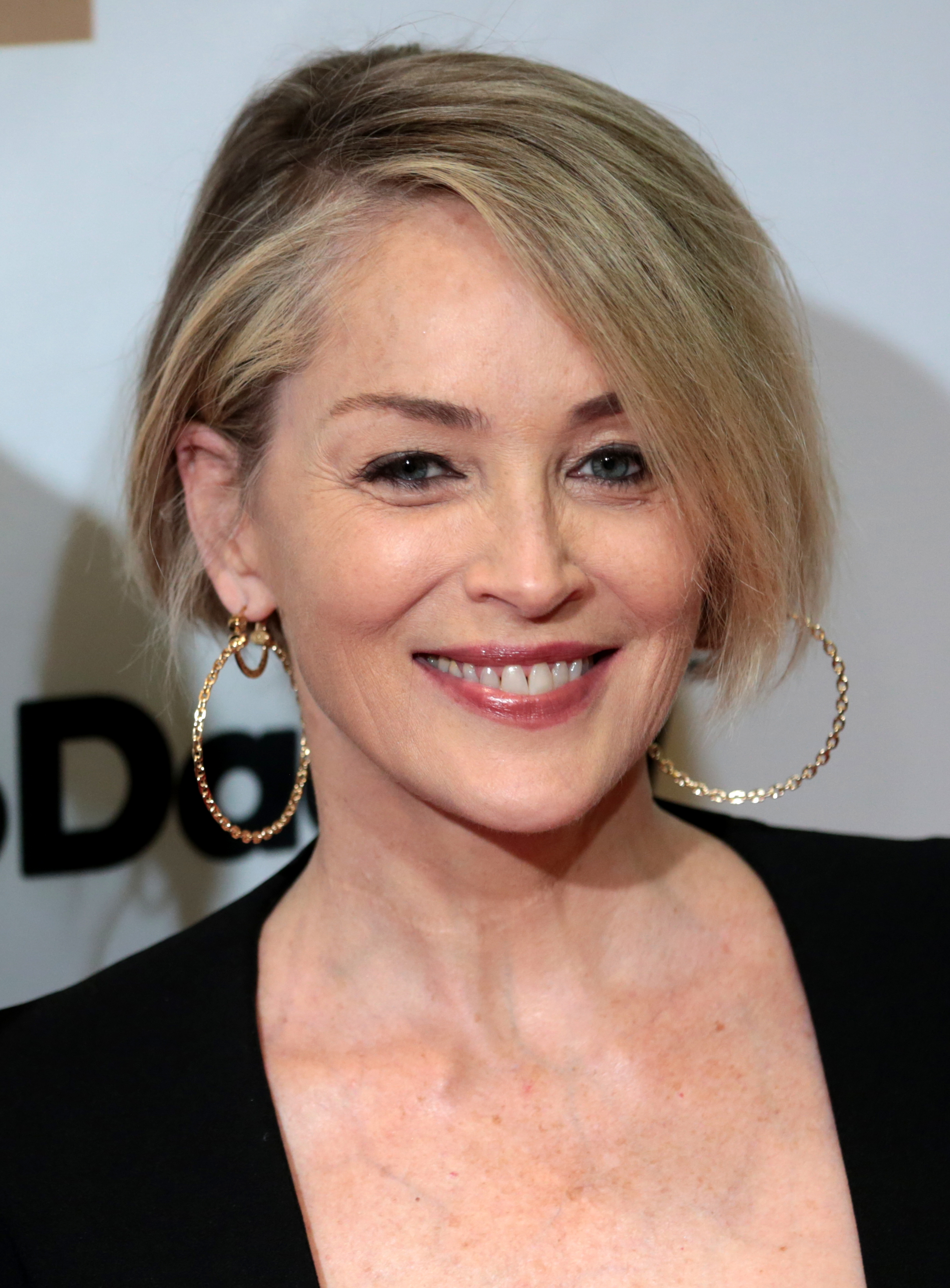
Sharon Stone won for Casino (1995).

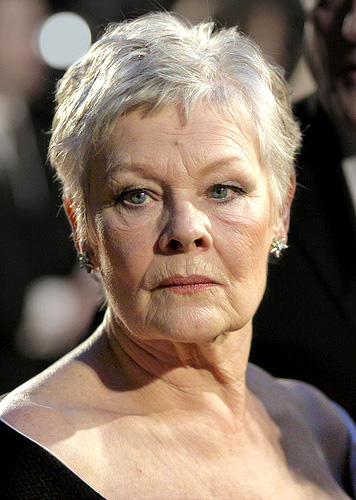
Judi Dench won for Mrs Brown (1997).

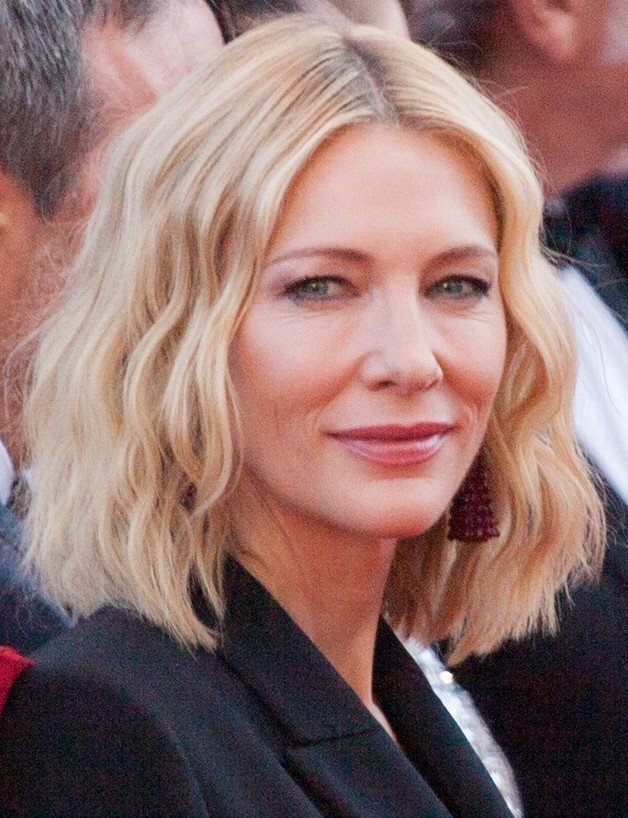
Cate Blanchett won three times for Elizabeth (1998), Blue Jasmine (2013), and Tár (2022).

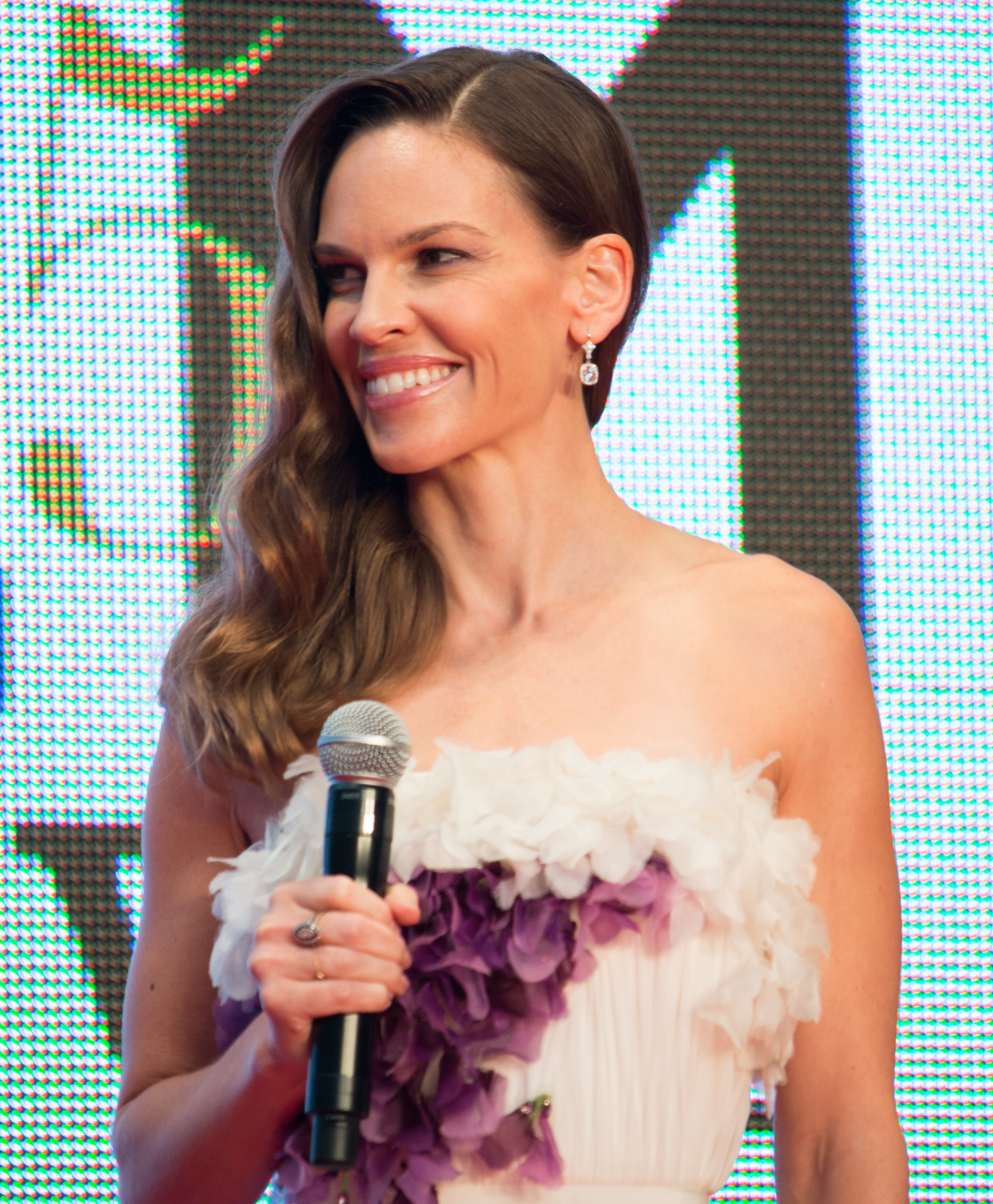
Hilary Swank won twice for Boys Don't Cry (1999) and Million Dollar Baby (2004).

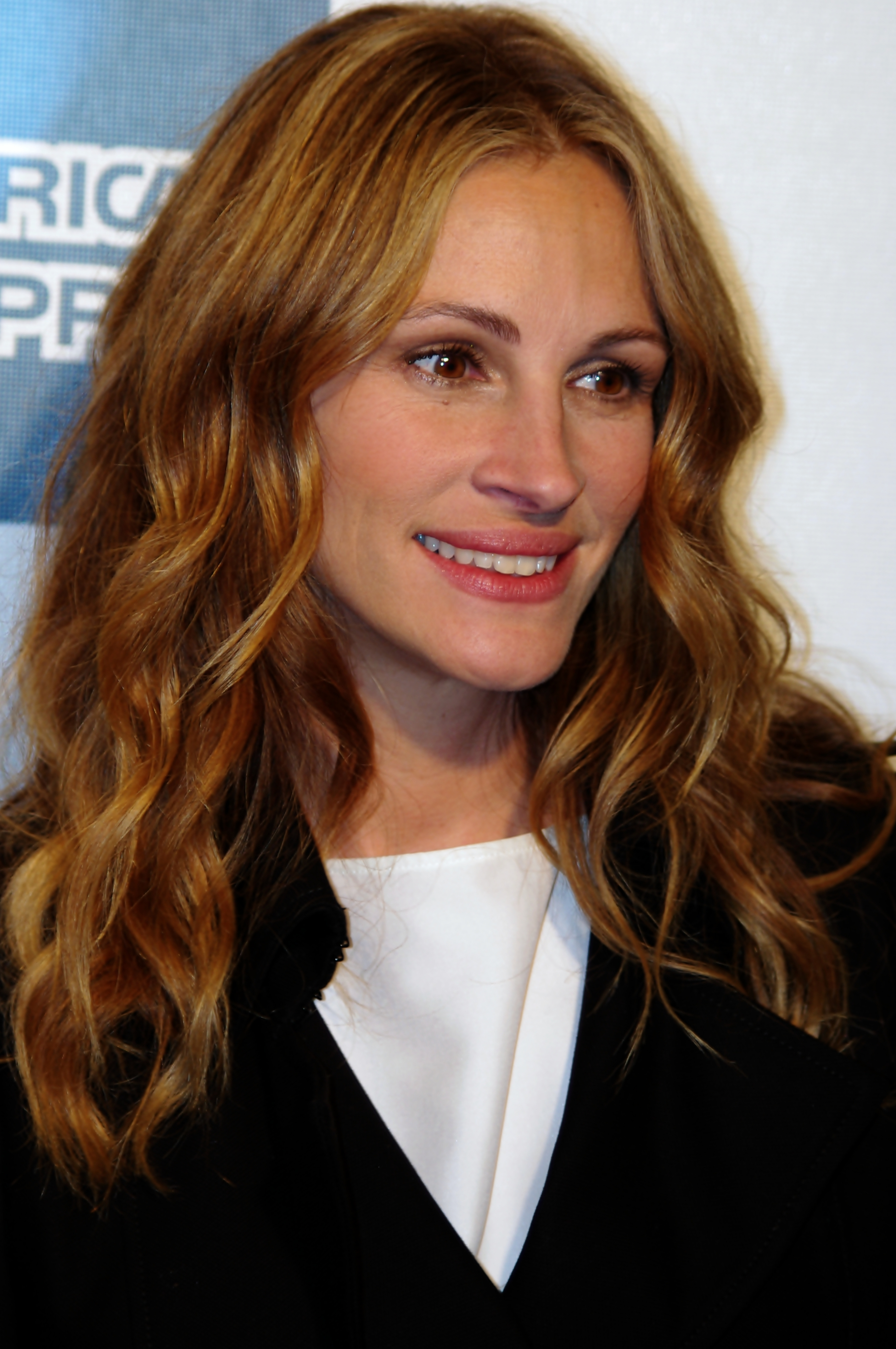
Julia Roberts won for Erin Brockovich (2000).

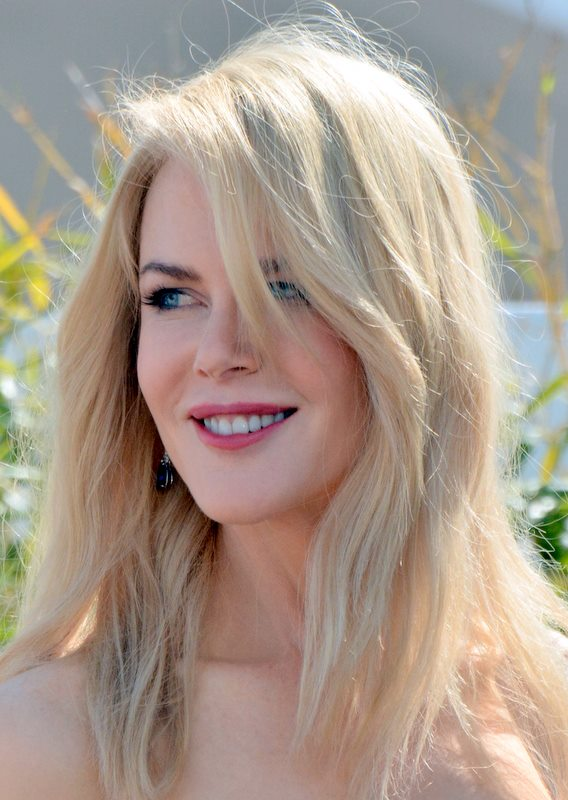
Nicole Kidman won twice for The Hours (2002) and Being the Ricardos (2021).

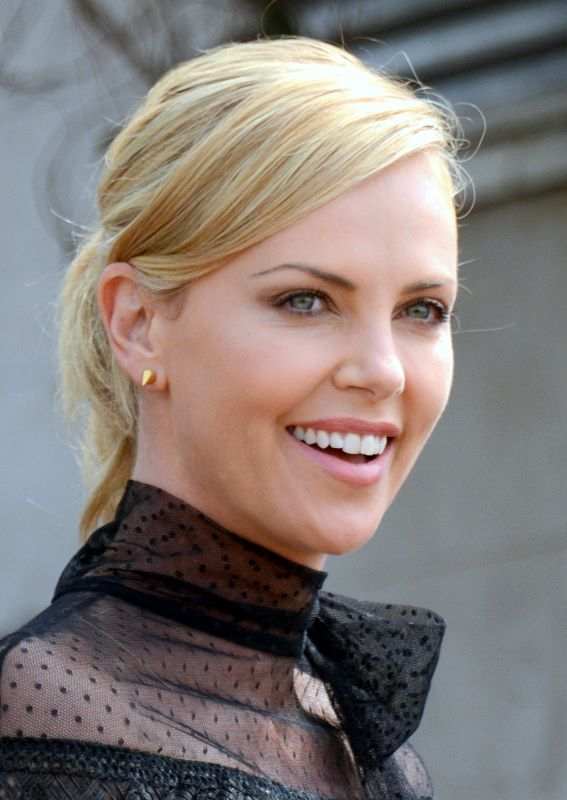
Charlize Theron won for Monster (2003).

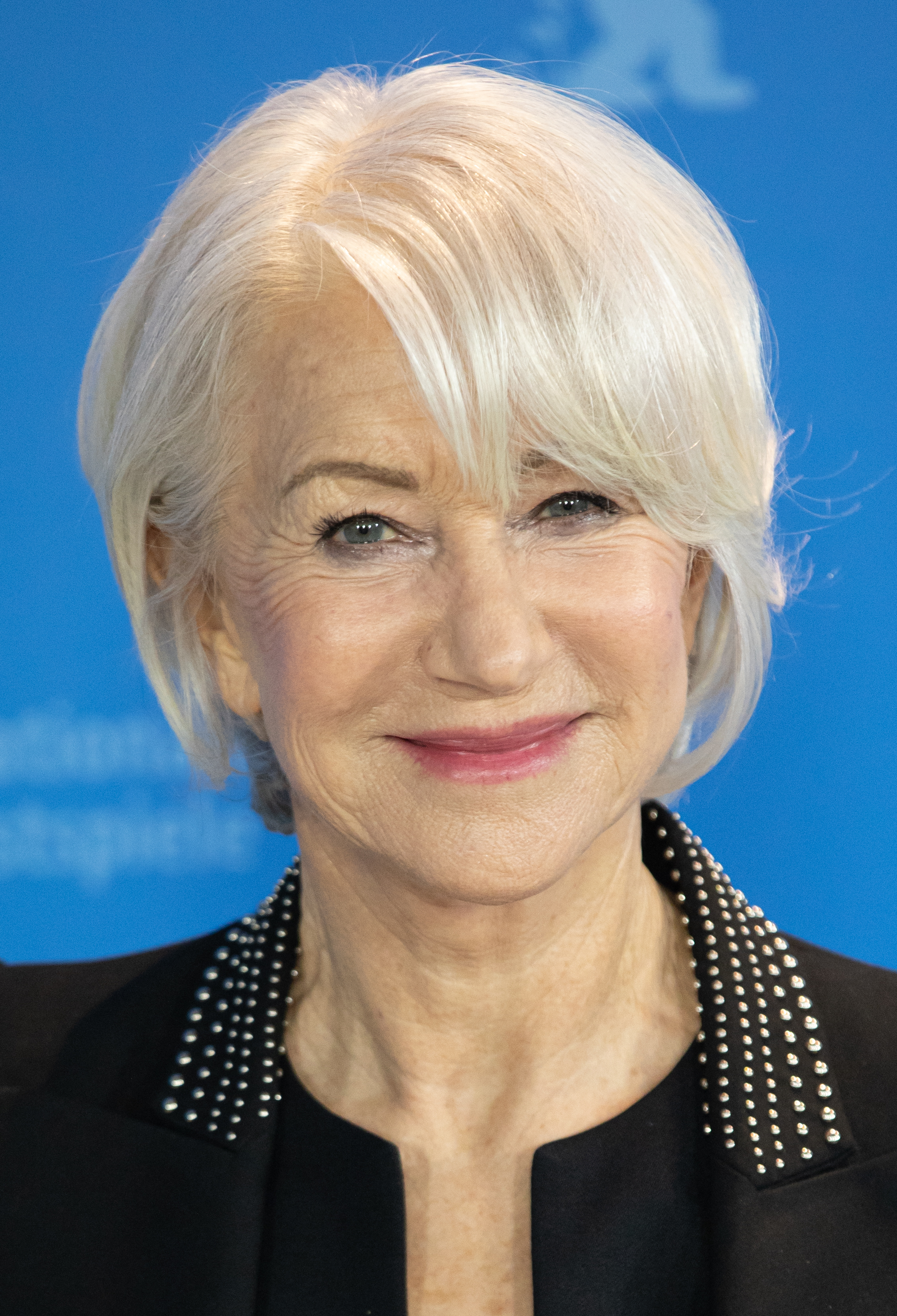
Helen Mirren won for The Queen (2006).

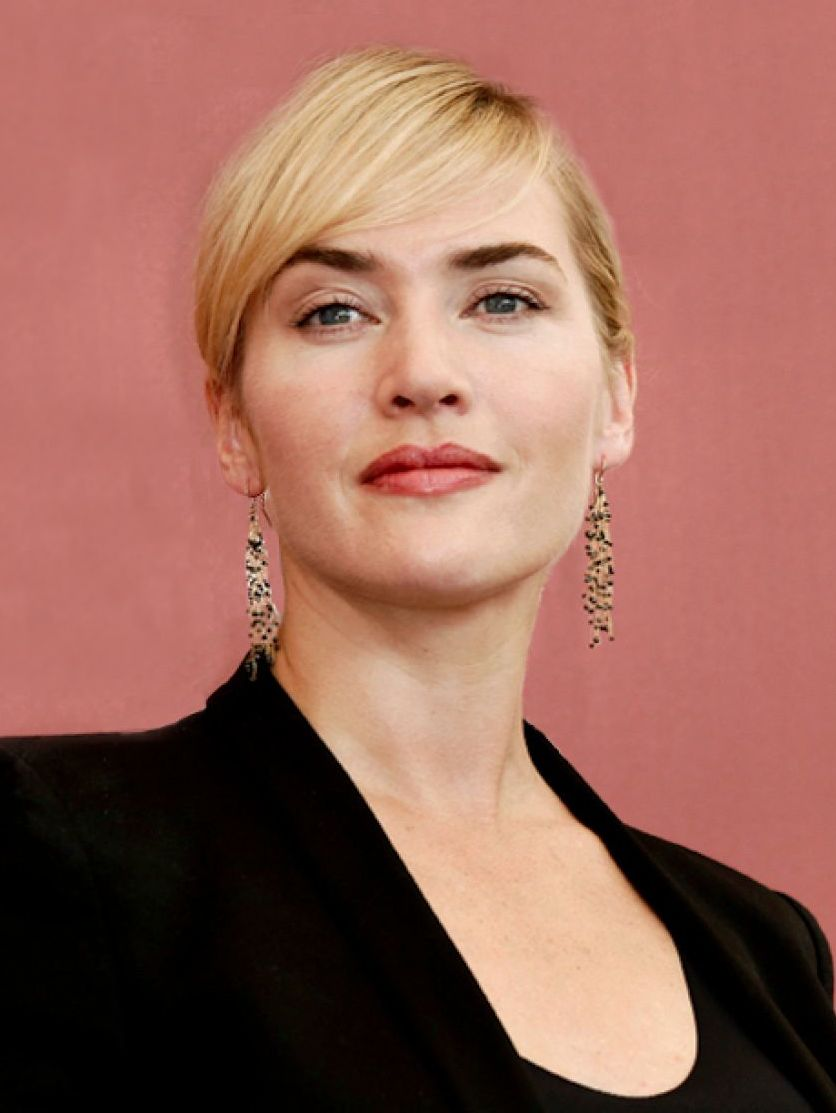
Kate Winslet won for Revolutionary Road (2008).

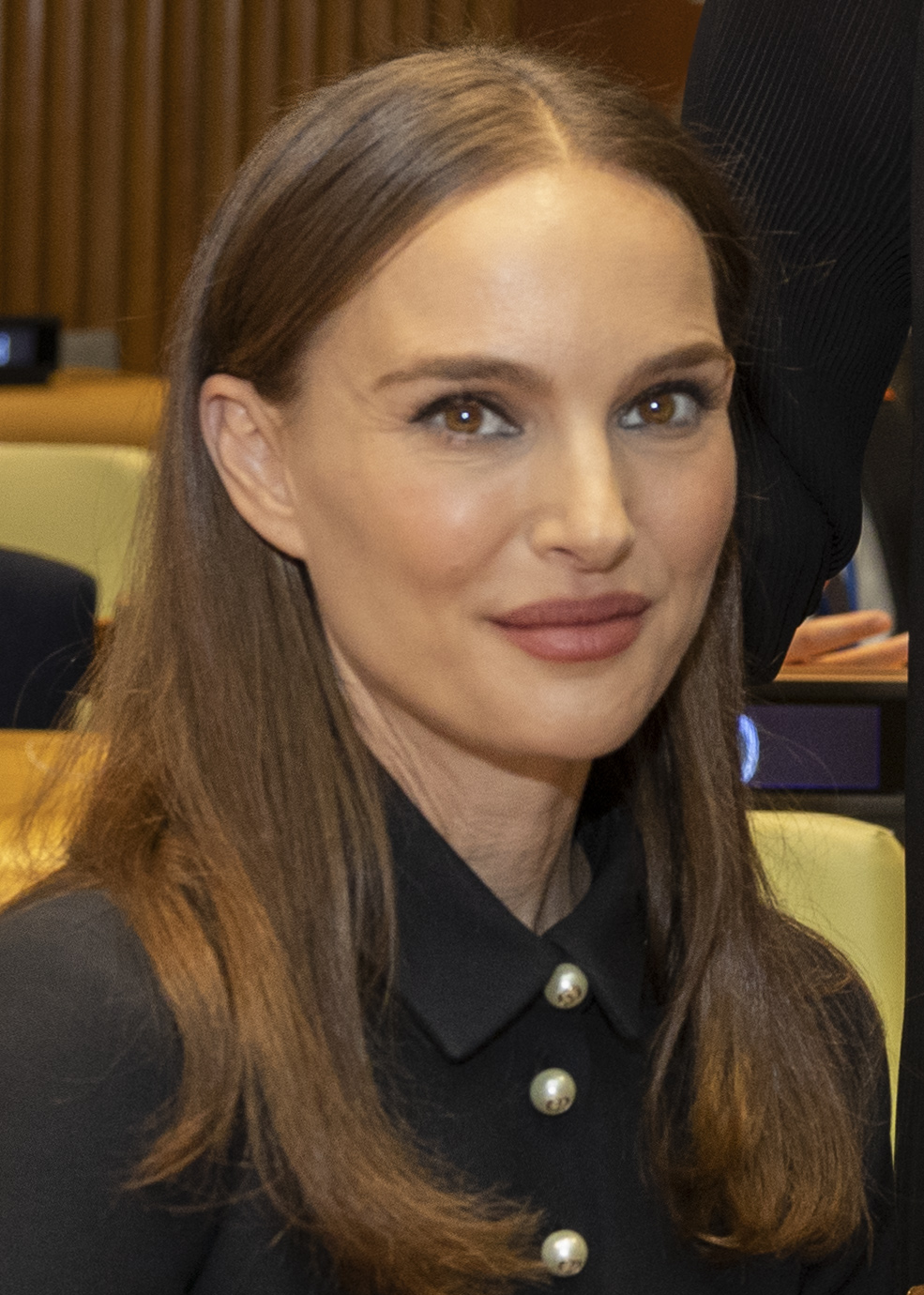
Natalie Portman won for Black Swan (2010).

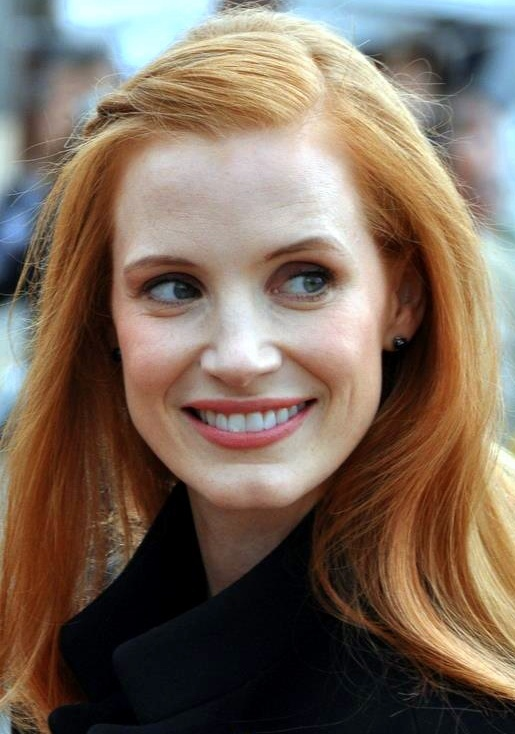
Jessica Chastain won for Zero Dark Thirty (2012).

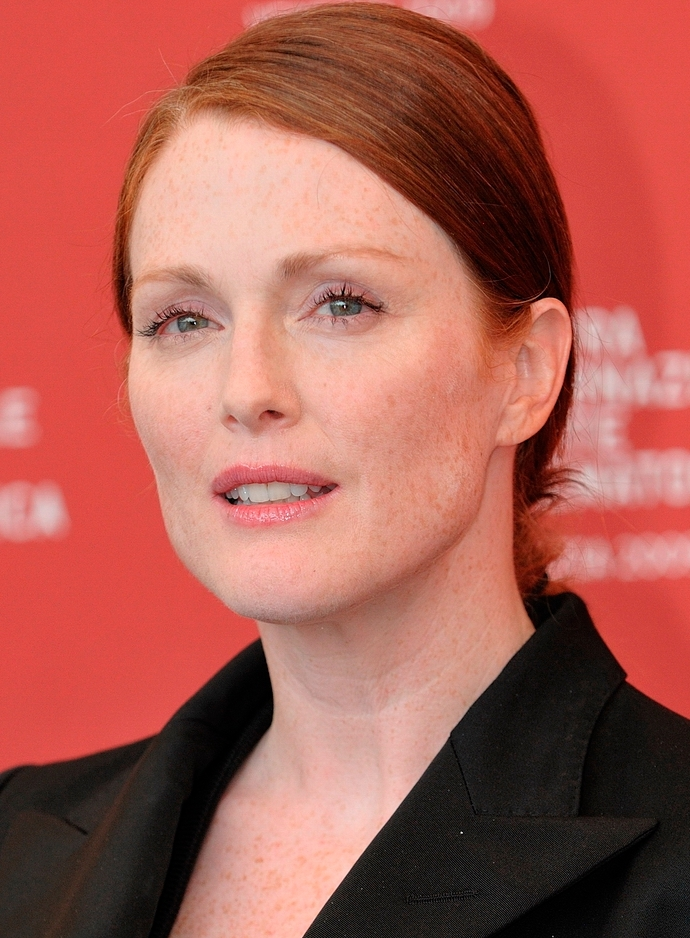
Julianne Moore won for Still Alice (2014).

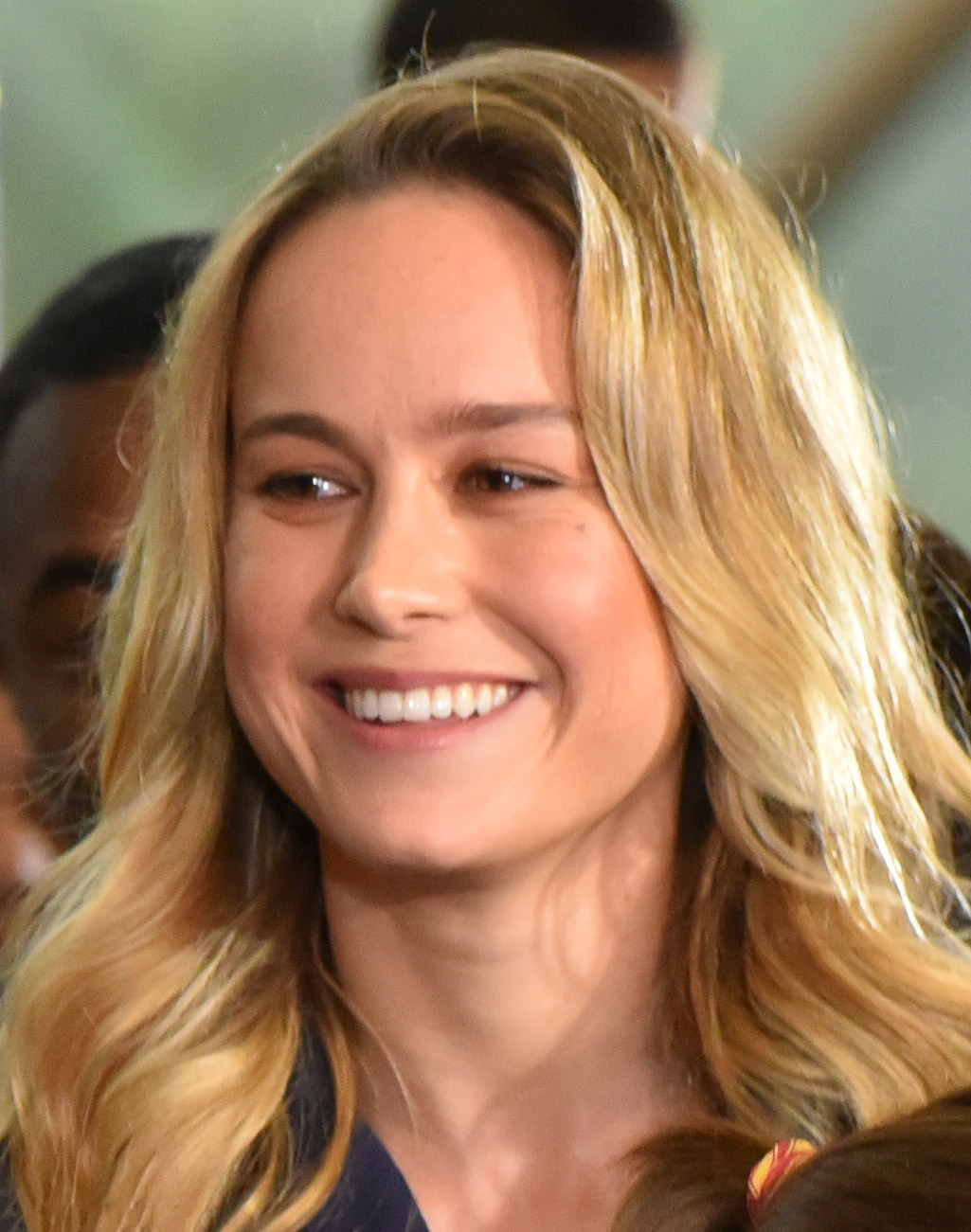
Brie Larson won for Room (2015).

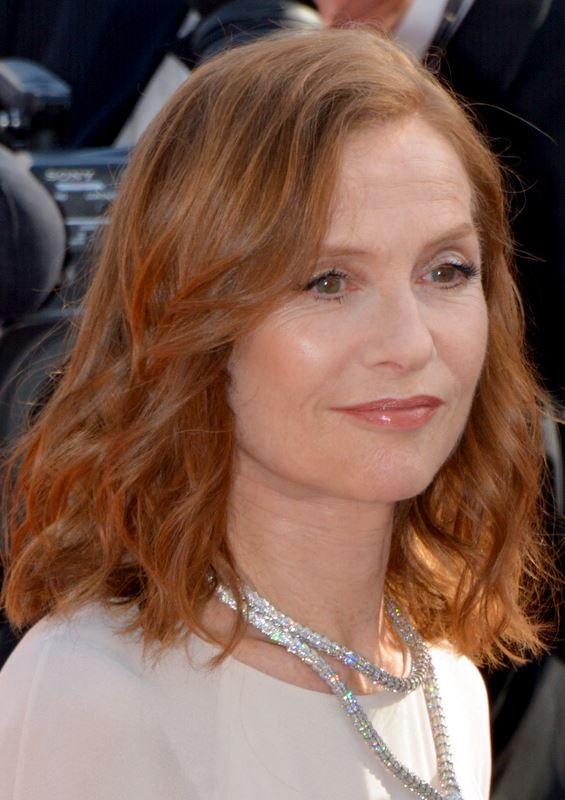
Isabelle Huppert won for Elle (2016).

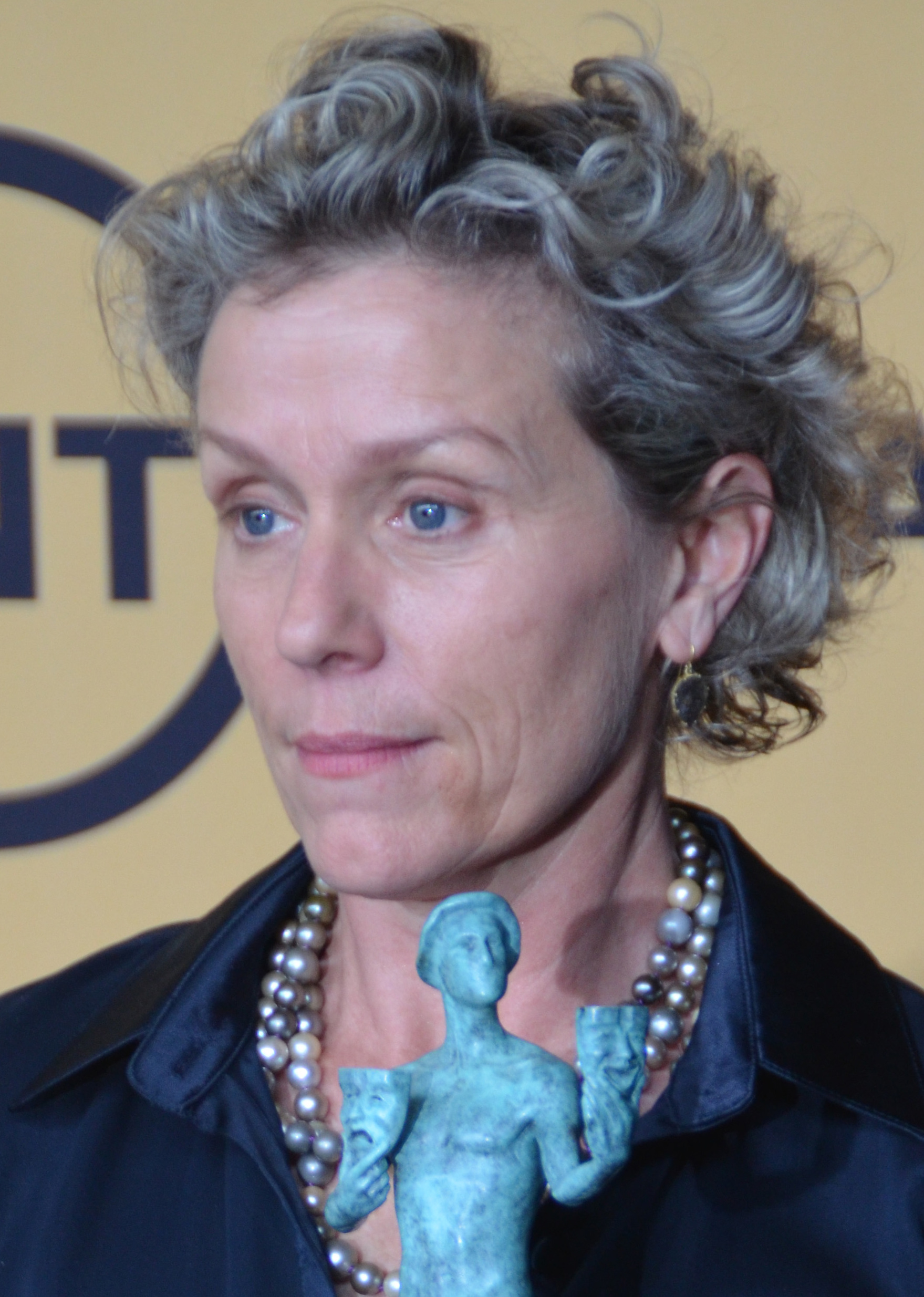
Frances McDormand won for Three Billboards Outside Ebbing, Missouri (2017).

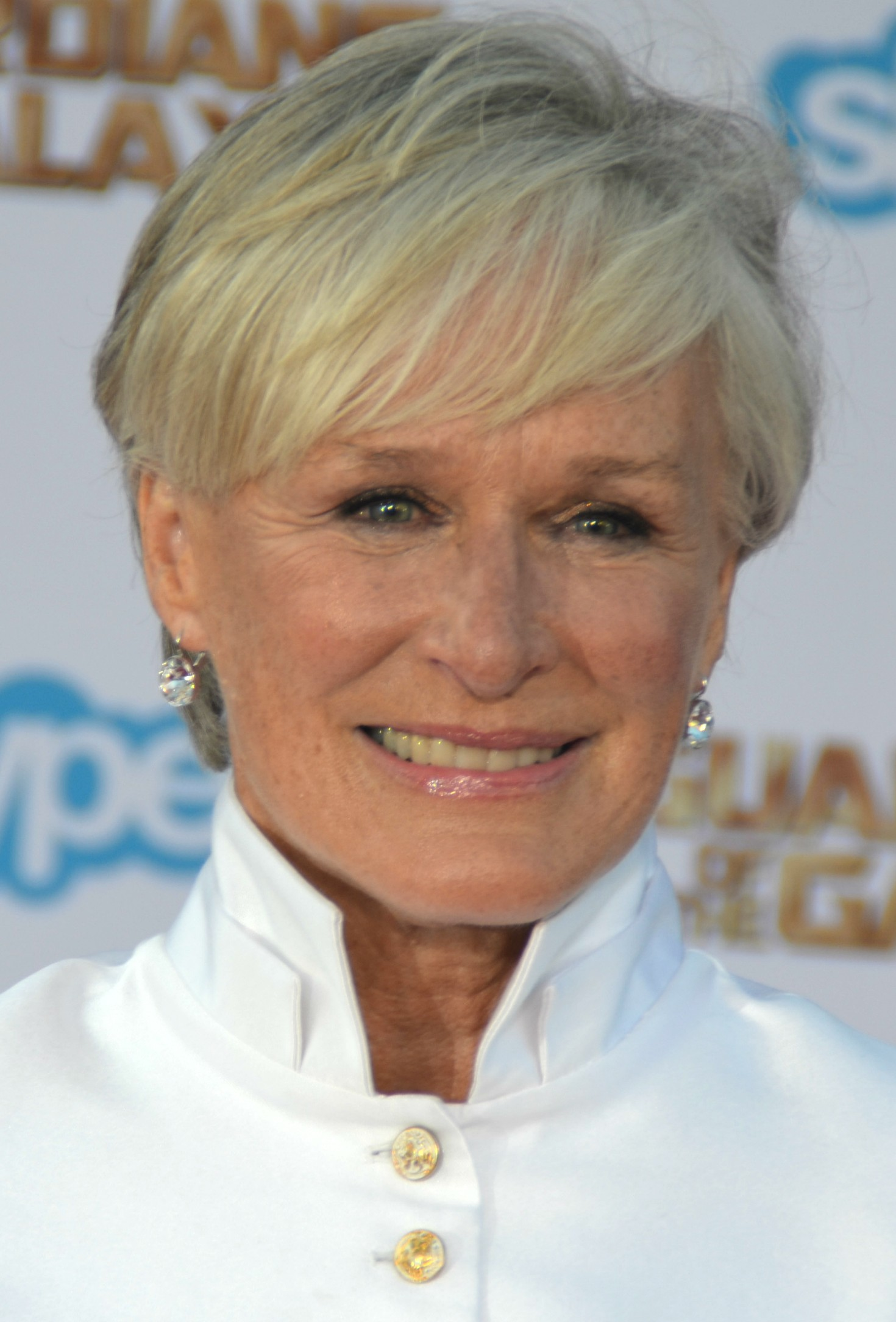
Glenn Close won for The Wife (2018).

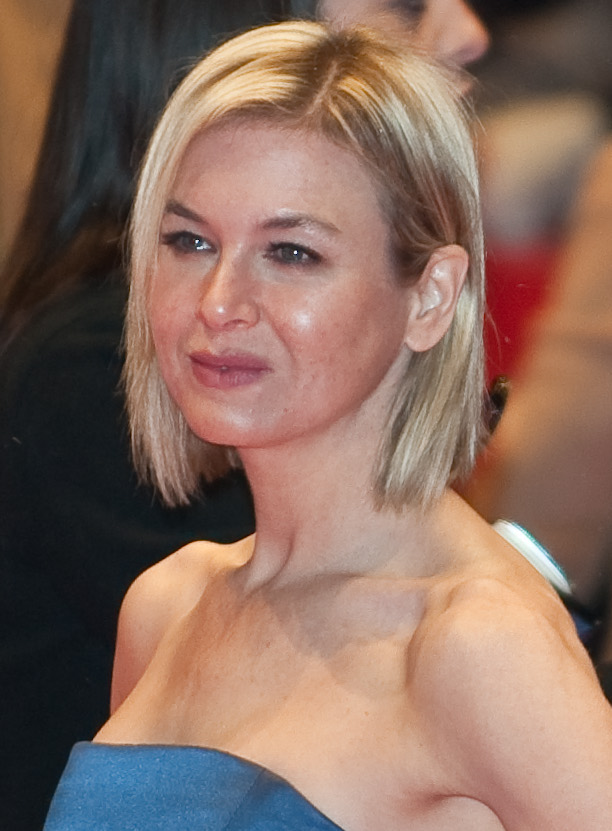
Renée Zellweger won for Judy (2019).

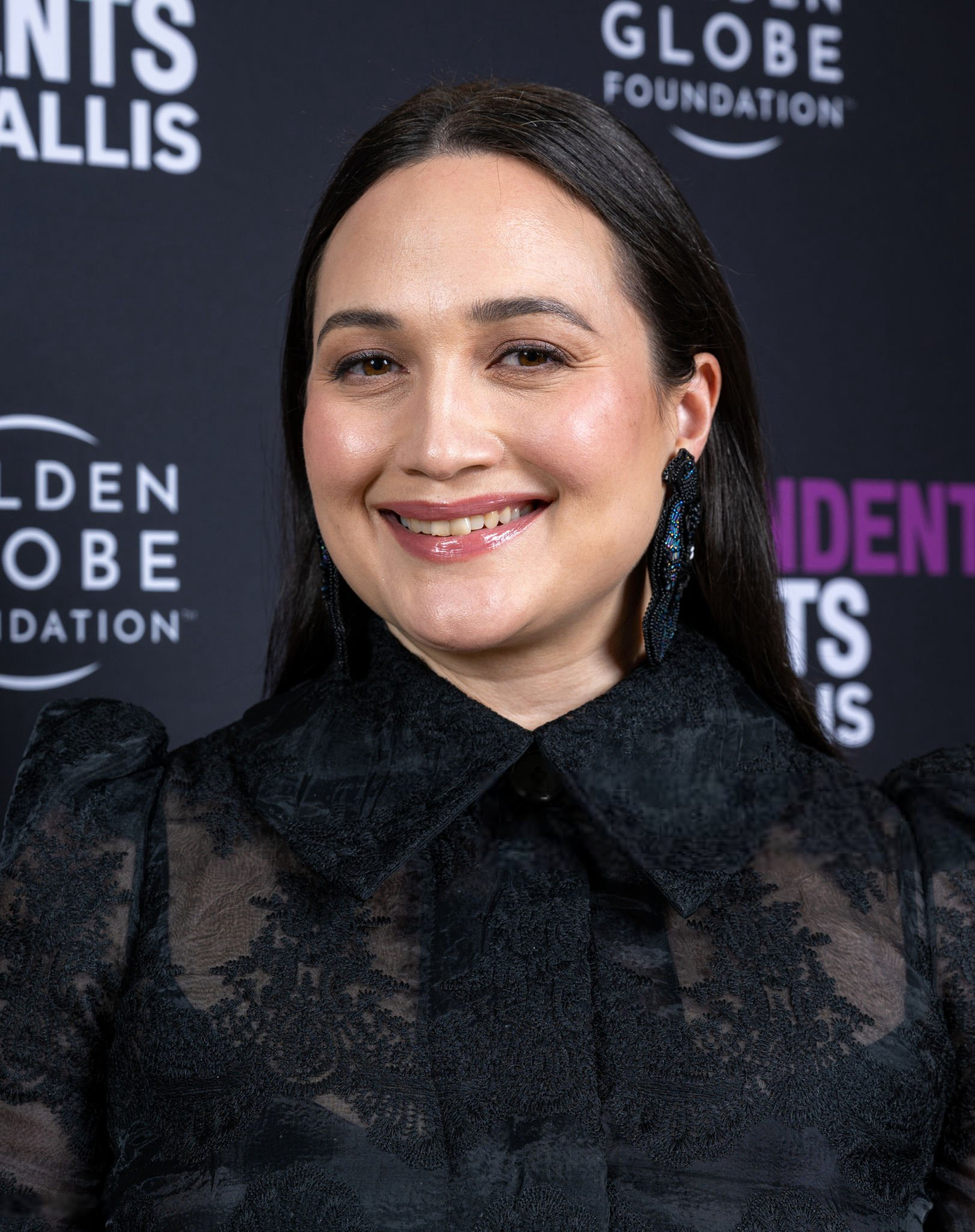
Lily Gladstone won for Killers of the Flower Moon (2023).

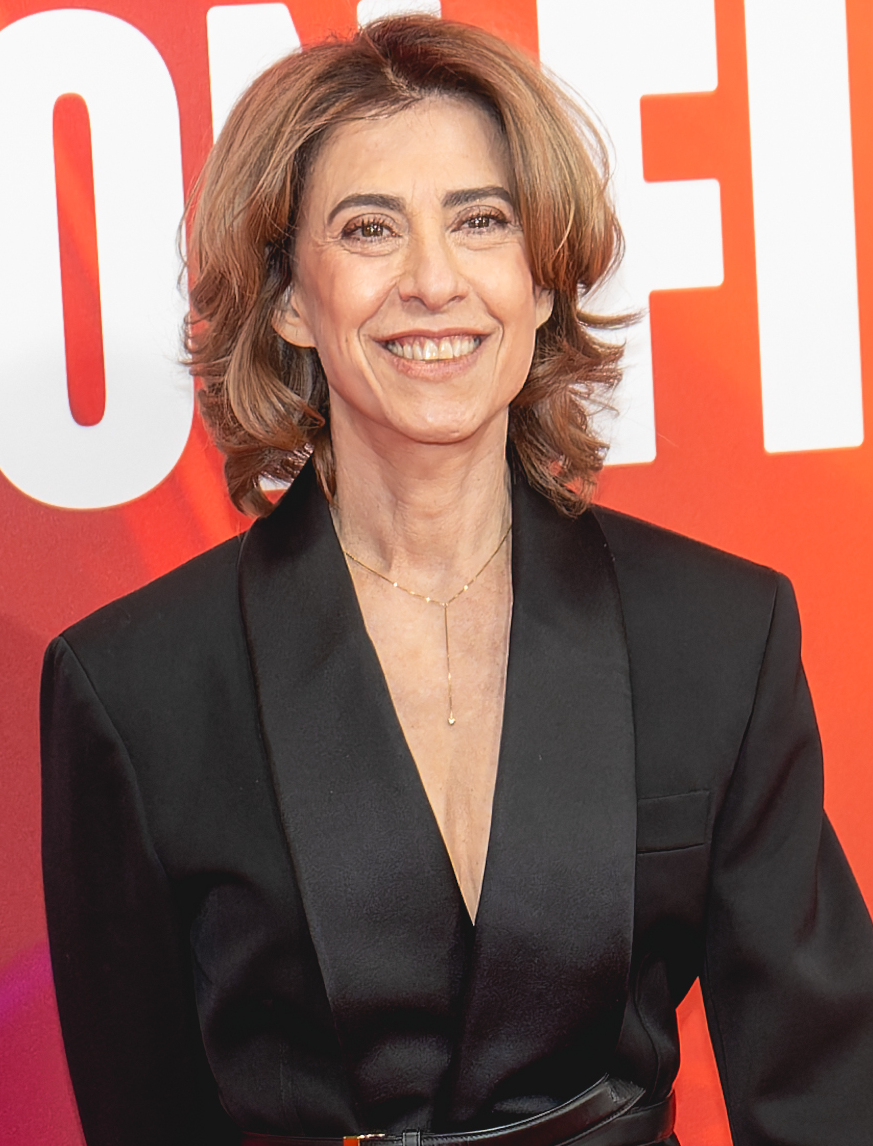
Fernanda Torres won for I'm Still Here (2024).

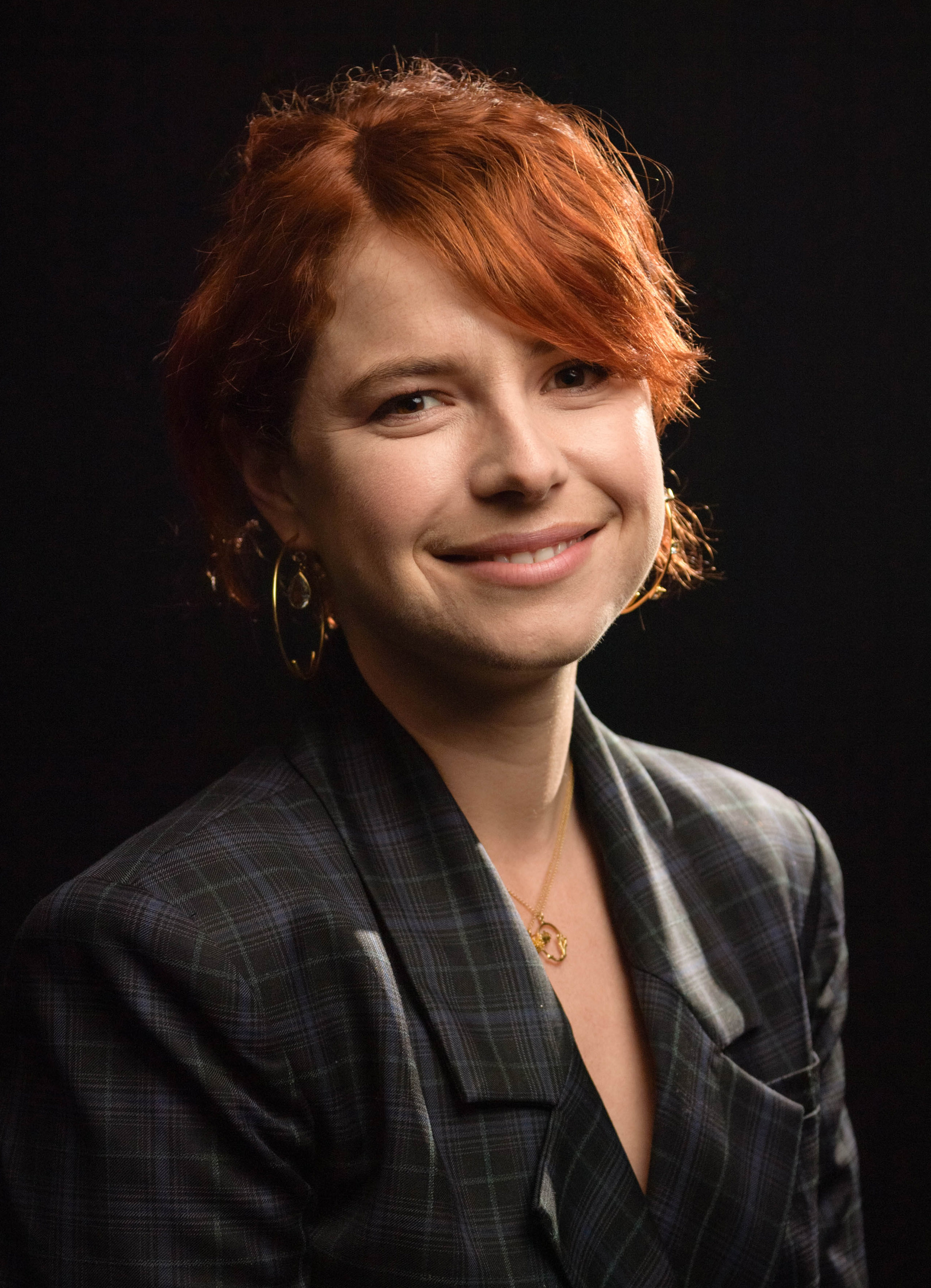
Jessie Buckley won for Hamnet (2025).

=== 1940s ===
Year	Actress	Role(s)	Film	Ref.
1943	Jennifer Jones †	Bernadette Soubirous	The Song of Bernadette	
1944	Ingrid Bergman †	Paula Alquist Anton	Gaslight †	
1945	Ingrid Bergman †	Sister Mary Benedict	The Bells of St. Mary's	
1946	Rosalind Russell	Sister Elizabeth Kenny	Sister Kenny	
1947	Rosalind Russell	Lavinia Mannon	Mourning Becomes Electra	
1948	Jane Wyman †	Belinda MacDonald	Johnny Belinda	
1949	Olivia de Havilland †	Catherine Sloper	The Heiress	
1949	Deborah Kerr	Evelyn Boult	Edward, My Son	

=== 1950s ===
Year	Actress	Role(s)	Film	Ref.
1950	Gloria Swanson	Norma Desmond	Sunset Boulevard	
1950	Bette Davis	Margo Channing	All About Eve	
1950	Judy Holliday †	Billie Dawn	Born Yesterday	
1951	Jane Wyman	LouLou Mason	The Blue Veil	
1951	Vivien Leigh †	Blanche DuBois	A Streetcar Named Desire †	
1951	Shelley Winters	Alice Tripp	A Place in the Sun	
1952	Shirley Booth †	Lola Delaney	Come Back, Little Sheba	
1952	Joan Crawford	Myra Hudson	Sudden Fear	
1952	Olivia de Havilland	Rachel Sangalletti Ashley	My Cousin Rachel	
1953	Audrey Hepburn †	Princess Ann ("Anya Smith")	Roman Holiday	
1954	Grace Kelly †	Georgie Elgin	The Country Girl	
1955	Anna Magnani †	Serafina Delle Rose	The Rose Tattoo	
1956	Ingrid Bergman †	Anna Koreff ("Anastasia") †	Anastasia	
1956	Carroll Baker	Baby Doll Meighan	Baby Doll	
1956	Helen Hayes	Dowager Empress Maria Feodorovona	Anastasia	
1956	Audrey Hepburn	Natasha Rostova	War and Peace	
1956	Katharine Hepburn	Lizzie Curry	The Rainmaker	
1957	Joanne Woodward †	Eve White / Eve Black / Jane	The Three Faces of Eve	
1957	Marlene Dietrich	Christine Vole / Helm	Witness for the Prosecution	
1957	Deborah Kerr	Sister Angela	Heaven Knows, Mr. Allison	
1957	Anna Magnani	Gioia	Wild Is the Wind	
1957	Eva Marie Saint	Celia Pope	A Hatful of Rain	
1958	Susan Hayward †	Barbara Graham	I Want to Live!	
1958	Ingrid Bergman	Gladys Aylward	The Inn of the Sixth Happiness	
1958	Deborah Kerr	Sibyl Railton-Bell	Separate Tables	
1958	Shirley MacLaine	Ginny Moorehead	Some Came Running	
1958	Jean Simmons	Charlotte Bronn	Home Before Dark	
1959	Elizabeth Taylor	Catherine Holly	Suddenly, Last Summer	
1959	Audrey Hepburn	Sister Luke	The Nun's Story	
1959	Katharine Hepburn	Violet Venable	Suddenly, Last Summer	
1959	Lee Remick	Laura Manion	Anatomy of a Murder	
1959	Simone Signoret †	Alice Aisgill	Room at the Top	

=== 1960s ===
Year	Actress	Role(s)	Film	Ref.
1960	Greer Garson	Eleanor Roosevelt	Sunrise at Campobello	
1960	Doris Day	Kit Preston	Midnight Lace	
1960	Nancy Kwan	Suzie Wong	The World of Suzie Wong	
1960	Jean Simmons	Sharon Falconer	Elmer Gantry	
1960	Elizabeth Taylor †	Gloria Wandrous	BUtterfield 8	
1961	Geraldine Page	Alma Winemiller	Summer and Smoke	
1961	Leslie Caron	Fanny	Fanny	
1961	Shirley MacLaine	Martha Dobie	The Children's Hour	
1961	Claudia McNeil	Lena Younger	A Raisin in the Sun	
1961	Natalie Wood	Deanie Loomis	Splendor in the Grass	
1962	Geraldine Page	Alexandra Del Lago	Sweet Bird of Youth	
1962	Anne Bancroft †	Anne Sullivan	The Miracle Worker	
1962	Bette Davis	Jane Hudson	What Ever Happened to Baby Jane?	
1962	Katharine Hepburn	Mary Tyrone	Long Day's Journey into Night	
1962	Glynis Johns	Teresa Harnish	The Chapman Report	
1962	Melina Mercouri	Phaedra	Phaedra	
1962	Lee Remick	Kirsten Arnesen Clay	Days of Wine and Roses	
1962	Susan Strasberg	Rosanna	Hemingway's Adventures of a Young Man	
1962	Shelley Winters	Charlotte Haze-Humbert	Lolita	
1962	Susannah York	Cecily Koertner	Freud: The Secret Passion	
1963	Leslie Caron	Jane Fosset	The L-Shaped Room	
1963	Polly Bergen	Lorna Medford	The Caretakers	
1963	Geraldine Page	Carrie Berniers	Toys in the Attic	
1963	Rachel Roberts	Margaret Hammond	This Sporting Life	
1963	Romy Schneider	Annemarie von Hartman	The Cardinal	
1963	Alida Valli	La Italiana	The Paper Man	
1963	Marina Vlady	Regina	The Conjugal Bed	
1963	Natalie Wood	Angie Rossini	Love with the Proper Stranger	
1964	Anne Bancroft	Jo Armitage	The Pumpkin Eater	
1964	Ava Gardner	Maxine Faulk	The Night of the Iguana	
1964	Rita Hayworth	Lili Alfredo	Circus World	
1964	Geraldine Page	Evie Jackson	Dear Heart	
1964	Jean Seberg	Lilith Arthur	Lilith	
1965	Samantha Eggar	Miranda Grey	The Collector	
1965	Julie Christie †	Diana Scott	Darling	
1965	Elizabeth Hartman	Selina D'Arcey	A Patch of Blue	
1965	Simone Signoret	La Condesa	Ship of Fools	
1965	Maggie Smith	Desdemona	Othello	
1966	Anouk Aimée	Anne Gauthier	A Man and a Woman	
1966	Ida Kamińska	Rozalie Lautmann	The Shop on Main Street	
1966	Virginia McKenna	Joy Adamson	Born Free	
1966	Elizabeth Taylor †	Martha	Who's Afraid of Virginia Woolf?	
1966	Natalie Wood	Alva Starr	This Property Is Condemned	
1967	Edith Evans	Maggie Ross	The Whisperers	
1967	Faye Dunaway	Bonnie Parker	Bonnie and Clyde	
1967	Audrey Hepburn	Susy Hendrix	Wait Until Dark	
1967	Katharine Hepburn †	Christina Drayton	Guess Who's Coming to Dinner	
1967	Anne Heywood	Ellen March	The Fox	
1968	Joanne Woodward	Rachel Cameron	Rachel, Rachel	
1968	Mia Farrow	Rosemary Woodhouse	Rosemary's Baby	
1968	Katharine Hepburn †	Eleanor of Aquitaine	The Lion in Winter	
1968	Vanessa Redgrave	Isadora Duncan	Isadora	
1968	Beryl Reid	June "George" Buckridge	The Killing of Sister George	
1969	Geneviève Bujold	Anne Boleyn	Anne of the Thousand Days	
1969	Jane Fonda	Gloria Beatty	They Shoot Horses, Don't They?	
1969	Liza Minnelli	Pookie Adams	The Sterile Cuckoo	
1969	Jean Simmons	Mary Wilson	The Happy Ending	
1969	Maggie Smith †	Jean Brodie	The Prime of Miss Jean Brodie	

=== 1970s ===
Year	Actress	Role(s)	Film	Ref.
1970	Ali MacGraw	Jennifer Cavalleri	Love Story	
1970	Faye Dunaway	Lou Andreas Sand	Puzzle of a Downfall Child	
1970	Glenda Jackson †	Gudrun Brangwen	Women in Love	
1970	Melina Mercouri	Nina Kacew	Promise at Dawn	
1970	Sarah Miles	Rosy Ryan	Ryan's Daughter	
1971	Jane Fonda †	Bree Daniels	Klute	
1971	Dyan Cannon	Julie Messinger	Such Good Friends	
1971	Glenda Jackson	Elizabeth I of England	Mary, Queen of Scots	
1971	Vanessa Redgrave	Mary, Queen of Scots	Mary, Queen of Scots	
1971	Jessica Walter	Evelyn Draper	Play Misty for Me	
1972	Liv Ullmann	Kristina Nilsson	The Emigrants	
1972	Diana Ross	Billie Holiday	Lady Sings the Blues	
1972	Cicely Tyson	Rebecca Morgan	Sounder	
1972	Trish Van Devere	Aimee Brower	One Is a Lonely Number	
1972	Tuesday Weld	Maria Wyeth	Play It as It Lays	
1972	Joanne Woodward	Beatrice Hunsdorfer	The Effect of Gamma Rays on Man-in-the-Moon Marigolds	
1973	Marsha Mason	Maggie Paul	Cinderella Liberty	
1973	Ellen Burstyn	Chris MacNeil	The Exorcist	
1973	Barbra Streisand	Kate Morosky	The Way We Were	
1973	Elizabeth Taylor	Barbara Sawyer	Ash Wednesday	
1973	Joanne Woodward	Rita Walden	Summer Wishes, Winter Dreams	
1974	Gena Rowlands	Mabel Longhetti	A Woman Under the Influence	
1974	Ellen Burstyn †	Alice Hyatt	Alice Doesn't Live Here Anymore	
1974	Faye Dunaway	Evelyn Cross Mulwray	Chinatown	
1974	Valerie Perrine	Honey Bruce	Lenny	
1974	Liv Ullmann	Marianne	Scenes from a Marriage	
1975	Louise Fletcher †	Nurse Ratched	One Flew Over the Cuckoo's Nest	
1975	Karen Black	Faye Greener	The Day of the Locust	
1975	Faye Dunaway	Kathy Hale	Three Days of the Condor	
1975	Marilyn Hassett	Jill Kinmont Boothe	The Other Side of the Mountain	
1975	Glenda Jackson	Hedda Gabler	Hedda	
1976	Faye Dunaway †	Diana Christensen	Network	
1976	Glenda Jackson	Sarah Bernhardt	The Incredible Sarah	
1976	Sarah Miles	Anne Osbourne	The Sailor Who Fell from Grace with the Sea	
1976	Talia Shire	Adrian Pennino	Rocky	
1976	Liv Ullmann	Dr. Jenny Isaksson	Face to Face	
1977	Jane Fonda	Lillian Hellman	Julia	
1977	Anne Bancroft	Emma Jacklin	The Turning Point	
1977	Diane Keaton	Theresa Dunn	Looking for Mr. Goodbar	
1977	Kathleen Quinlan	Deborah Blake	I Never Promised You a Rose Garden	
1977	Gena Rowlands	Myrtle Gordon	Opening Night	
1978	Jane Fonda †	Sally Hyde	Coming Home	
1978	Ingrid Bergman	Charlotte Andergast	Autumn Sonata	
1978	Jill Clayburgh	Erica Benton	An Unmarried Woman	
1978	Glenda Jackson	Stevie Smith	Stevie	
1978	Geraldine Page	Eve	Interiors	
1979	Sally Field †	Norma Rae Webster	Norma Rae	
1979	Jill Clayburgh	Caterina Silveri	La Luna	
1979	Lisa Eichhorn	Jean Moreton	Yanks	
1979	Jane Fonda	Kimberly Wells	The China Syndrome	
1979	Marsha Mason	Dr. Alexandra Kendall	Promises in the Dark	

=== 1980s ===
Year	Actress	Role(s)	Film	Ref.
1980	Mary Tyler Moore	Beth Jarrett	Ordinary People	
1980	Ellen Burstyn	Edna Mae McCauley	Resurrection	
1980	Nastassja Kinski	Tess Durbeyfield	Tess	
1980	Deborah Raffin	Lena Canada	Touched by Love	
1980	Gena Rowlands	Gloria Swenson	Gloria	
1981	Meryl Streep	Sarah Woodruff / Anna	The French Lieutenant's Woman	
1981	Sally Field	Megan Carter	Absence of Malice	
1981	Katharine Hepburn †	Ethel Thayer	On Golden Pond	
1981	Diane Keaton	Louise Bryant	Reds	
1981	Sissy Spacek	Nita Longley	Raggedy Man	
1982	Meryl Streep †	Sophie Zawistowski	Sophie's Choice	
1982	Diane Keaton	Faith Dunlap	Shoot the Moon	
1982	Jessica Lange	Frances Farmer	Frances	
1982	Sissy Spacek	Beth Horman	Missing	
1982	Debra Winger	Paula Pokrifki	An Officer and a Gentleman	
1983	Shirley MacLaine †	Aurora Greenway	Terms of Endearment	
1983	Jane Alexander	Carol Amen	Testament	
1983	Bonnie Bedelia	Shirley Roque	Heart Like a Wheel	
1983	Meryl Streep	Karen Silkwood	Silkwood	
1983	Debra Winger	Emma Greenway-Horton	Terms of Endearment	
1984	Sally Field †	Edna Spalding	Places in the Heart	
1984	Diane Keaton	Kate Soffel	Mrs. Soffel	
1984	Jessica Lange	Jewell Ivy	Country	
1984	Vanessa Redgrave	Olive Chancellor	The Bostonians	
1984	Sissy Spacek	Mae Garvey	The River	
1985	Whoopi Goldberg	Celie Johnson	The Color Purple	
1985	Anne Bancroft	Miriam Ruth	Agnes of God	
1985	Cher	Florence "Rusty" Dennis	Mask	
1985	Geraldine Page †	Carrie Watts	The Trip to Bountiful	
1985	Meryl Streep	Karen Blixen	Out of Africa	
1986	Marlee Matlin †	Sarah Norman	Children of a Lesser God	
1986	Julie Andrews	Stephanie Anderson	Duet for One	
1986	Anne Bancroft	Thelma Cates	'night, Mother	
1986	Farrah Fawcett	Marjorie	Extremities	
1986	Sigourney Weaver	Ellen Ripley	Aliens	
1987	Sally Kirkland	Anna	Anna	
1987	Rachel Chagall	Gabriela "Gaby" Brimmer	Gaby: A True Story	
1987	Glenn Close	Alex Forrest	Fatal Attraction	
1987	Faye Dunaway	Wanda Wilcox	Barfly	
1987	Barbra Streisand	Claudia Draper	Nuts	
1988	Jodie Foster †	Sarah Tobias	The Accused	
1988	Shirley MacLaine	Madame Sousatzka	Madame Sousatzka	
1988	Sigourney Weaver	Dian Fossey	Gorillas in the Mist	
1988	Christine Lahti	Annie Pope / Cynthia Manfield	Running on Empty	
1988	Meryl Streep	Lindy Chamberlain-Creighton	A Cry in the Dark	
1989	Michelle Pfeiffer	Susie Diamond	The Fabulous Baker Boys	
1989	Sally Field	M'Lynn Eatenton	Steel Magnolias	
1989	Jessica Lange	Ann Talbot	Music Box	
1989	Andie MacDowell	Ann Bishop Mullany	Sex, Lies, and Videotape	
1989	Liv Ullmann	Gabriele	The Rose Garden	

=== 1990s ===
Year	Actress	Role(s)	Film	Ref.
1990	Kathy Bates †	Annie Wilkes	Misery	
1990	Anjelica Huston	Lilly Dillon	The Grifters	
1990	Michelle Pfeiffer	Katya Orlova	The Russia House	
1990	Susan Sarandon	Nora Baker	White Palace	
1990	Joanne Woodward	India Bridge	Mr. & Mrs. Bridge	
1991	Jodie Foster †	Clarice Starling	The Silence of the Lambs	
1991	Annette Bening	Virginia Hill	Bugsy	
1991	Geena Davis	Thelma Dickinson	Thelma & Louise	
1991	Laura Dern	Rose	Rambling Rose	
1991	Susan Sarandon	Louise Sawyer	Thelma & Louise	
1992	Emma Thompson †	Margaret Schlegel	Howards End	
1992	Mary McDonnell	May-Alice Culhane	Passion Fish	
1992	Michelle Pfeiffer	Lurene Hallett	Love Field	
1992	Susan Sarandon	Michaela Odone	Lorenzo's Oil	
1992	Sharon Stone	Catherine Tramell	Basic Instinct	
1993	Holly Hunter †	Ada McGrath	The Piano	
1993	Juliette Binoche	Julie de Courcy	Three Colours: Blue	
1993	Michelle Pfeiffer	Ellen Olenska	The Age of Innocence	
1993	Emma Thompson	Sally Kenton	The Remains of the Day	
1993	Debra Winger	Martha Horgan	A Dangerous Woman	
1994	Jessica Lange †	Carly Marshall	Blue Sky	
1994	Jodie Foster	Nell Kellty	Nell	
1994	Jennifer Jason Leigh	Dorothy Parker	Mrs. Parker and the Vicious Circle	
1994	Miranda Richardson	Vivienne Haigh-Wood Eliot	Tom & Viv	
1994	Meryl Streep	Gail Hartman	The River Wild	
1995	Sharon Stone	Ginger McKenna	Casino	
1995	Susan Sarandon †	Sister Helen Prejean	Dead Man Walking	
1995	Elisabeth Shue	Sera	Leaving Las Vegas	
1995	Meryl Streep	Francesca Johnson	The Bridges of Madison County	
1995	Emma Thompson	Elinor Dashwood	Sense and Sensibility	
1996	Brenda Blethyn	Cynthia Rose Purley	Secrets & Lies	
1996	Courtney Love	Althea Leasure	The People vs. Larry Flynt	
1996	Kristin Scott Thomas	Katharine Clifton	The English Patient	
1996	Meryl Streep	Lee Wakefield Lacker	Marvin's Room	
1996	Emily Watson	Bess McNeill	Breaking the Waves	
1997	Judi Dench	Queen Victoria	Mrs Brown	
1997	Helena Bonham Carter	Kate Croy	The Wings of the Dove	
1997	Jodie Foster	Eleanor Arroway	Contact	
1997	Jessica Lange	Ginny Cook Smith	A Thousand Acres	
1997	Kate Winslet	Rose DeWitt Bukater	Titanic	
1998	Cate Blanchett	Queen Elizabeth I	Elizabeth	
1998	Fernanda Montenegro	Isadora "Dora" Teixeira	Central Station	
1998	Susan Sarandon	Jackie Harrison	Stepmom	
1998	Meryl Streep	Kate Gulden	One True Thing	
1998	Emily Watson	Jacqueline du Pré	Hilary and Jackie	
1999	Hilary Swank †	Brandon Teena	Boys Don't Cry	
1999	Annette Bening	Carolyn Burnham	American Beauty	
1999	Julianne Moore	Sarah Myles	The End of the Affair	
1999	Meryl Streep	Roberta Guaspari	Music of the Heart	
1999	Sigourney Weaver	Alice Goodwin	A Map of the World	

=== 2000s ===
Year	Actress	Role(s)	Film	Ref.
2000	Julia Roberts †	Erin Brockovich	Erin Brockovich	
2000	Joan Allen	Laine Hanson	The Contender	
2000	Björk	Selma Ježková	Dancer in the Dark	
2000	Ellen Burstyn	Sara Goldfarb	Requiem for a Dream	
2000	Laura Linney	Samantha "Sammy" Prescott	You Can Count on Me	
2001	Sissy Spacek	Ruth Fowler	In the Bedroom	
2001	Halle Berry †	Leticia Musgrove	Monster's Ball	
2001	Judi Dench	Iris Murdoch	Iris	
2001	Nicole Kidman	Grace Stewart	The Others	
2001	Tilda Swinton	Margaret Hall	The Deep End	
2002	Nicole Kidman †	Virginia Woolf	The Hours	
2002	Salma Hayek	Frida Kahlo	Frida	
2002	Diane Lane	Connie Summer	Unfaithful	
2002	Julianne Moore	Cathy Whitaker	Far from Heaven	
2002	Meryl Streep	Clarissa Vaughan	The Hours	
2003	Charlize Theron †	Aileen Wuornos	Monster	
2003	Cate Blanchett	Veronica Guerin	Veronica Guerin	
2003	Scarlett Johansson	Griet Huller	Girl with a Pearl Earring	
2003	Nicole Kidman	Ada Monroe	Cold Mountain	
2003	Uma Thurman	Beatrix Kiddo	Kill Bill: Volume 1	
2003	Evan Rachel Wood	Tracy Freeland	Thirteen	
2004	Hilary Swank †	Maggie Fitzgerald	Million Dollar Baby	
2004	Scarlett Johansson	Pursy Will	A Love Song for Bobby Long	
2004	Nicole Kidman	Anna Wicker	Birth	
2004	Imelda Staunton	Vera Drake	Vera Drake	
2004	Uma Thurman	Beatrix Kiddo	Kill Bill: Volume 2	
2005	Felicity Huffman	Bree Osbourne	Transamerica	
2005	Maria Bello	Edie Stall	A History of Violence	
2005	Gwyneth Paltrow	Catherine Posey	Proof	
2005	Charlize Theron	Josey Aimes	North Country	
2005	Zhang Ziyi	Chiyo Sakamoto / Sayuri Nitta	Memoirs of a Geisha	
2006	Helen Mirren †	Queen Elizabeth II	The Queen	
2006	Penélope Cruz	Raimunda	Volver	
2006	Judi Dench	Barbara Covett	Notes on a Scandal	
2006	Maggie Gyllenhaal	Sherry Swanson	Sherrybaby	
2006	Kate Winslet	Sarah Pierce	Little Children	
2007	Julie Christie	Fiona Anderson	Away from Her	
2007	Cate Blanchett	Queen Elizabeth I	Elizabeth: The Golden Age	
2007	Jodie Foster	Erica Bain	The Brave One	
2007	Angelina Jolie	Mariane Pearl	A Mighty Heart	
2007	Keira Knightley	Cecilia Tallis	Atonement	
2008	Kate Winslet	April Wheeler	Revolutionary Road	
2008	Anne Hathaway	Kym Bachman	Rachel Getting Married	
2008	Angelina Jolie	Christine Collins	Changeling	
2008	Kristin Scott Thomas	Juliette Fontaine	I've Loved You So Long	
2008	Meryl Streep	Sister Aloysius Beauvier	Doubt	
2009	Sandra Bullock †	Leigh Anne Tuohy	The Blind Side	
2009	Emily Blunt	Queen Victoria	The Young Victoria	
2009	Helen Mirren	Sofya Tolstoy	The Last Station	
2009	Carey Mulligan	Jenny Mellor	An Education	
2009	Gabourey Sidibe	Claireece "Precious" Jones	Precious	

=== 2010s ===
Year	Actress	Role(s)	Film	Ref.
2010	Natalie Portman †	Nina Sayers	Black Swan	
2010	Halle Berry	Frankie / Genius / Alice	Frankie & Alice	
2010	Nicole Kidman	Becca Corbett	Rabbit Hole	
2010	Jennifer Lawrence	Ree Dolly	Winter's Bone	
2010	Michelle Williams	Cindy Hiller	Blue Valentine	
2011	Meryl Streep †	Margaret Thatcher	The Iron Lady	
2011	Glenn Close	Albert Nobbs	Albert Nobbs	
2011	Viola Davis	Aibileen Clark	The Help	
2011	Rooney Mara	Lisbeth Salander	The Girl with the Dragon Tattoo	
2011	Tilda Swinton	Eva Khatchadourian	We Need to Talk About Kevin	
2012	Jessica Chastain	Maya Harris	Zero Dark Thirty	
2012	Marion Cotillard	Stéphanie	Rust and Bone	
2012	Helen Mirren	Alma Reville	Hitchcock	
2012	Naomi Watts	Maria Bennett	The Impossible	
2012	Rachel Weisz	Hester Collyer	The Deep Blue Sea	
2013	Cate Blanchett †	Jeanette "Jasmine" Francis	Blue Jasmine	
2013	Sandra Bullock	Dr. Ryan Stone	Gravity	
2013	Judi Dench	Philomena Lee	Philomena	
2013	Emma Thompson	P. L. Travers	Saving Mr. Banks	
2013	Kate Winslet	Adele Wheeler	Labor Day	
2014	Julianne Moore †	Dr. Alice Howland	Still Alice	
2014	Jennifer Aniston	Claire Bennett	Cake	
2014	Felicity Jones	Jane Hawking	The Theory of Everything	
2014	Rosamund Pike	Amy Elliott-Dunne	Gone Girl	
2014	Reese Witherspoon	Cheryl Strayed	Wild	
2015	Brie Larson †	Joy "Ma" Newsome	Room	
2015	Cate Blanchett	Carol Aird	Carol	
2015	Rooney Mara	Therese Belivet	Carol	
2015	Saoirse Ronan	Eilis Lacey	Brooklyn	
2015	Alicia Vikander	Gerda Wegener	The Danish Girl	
2016	Isabelle Huppert	Michèle Leblanc	Elle	
2016	Amy Adams	Dr. Louise Banks	Arrival	
2016	Jessica Chastain	Elizabeth Sloane	Miss Sloane	
2016	Ruth Negga	Mildred Loving	Loving	
2016	Natalie Portman	Jackie Kennedy	Jackie	
2017	Frances McDormand †	Mildred Hayes	Three Billboards Outside Ebbing, Missouri	
2017	Jessica Chastain	Molly Bloom	Molly's Game	
2017	Sally Hawkins	Elisa Esposito	The Shape of Water	
2017	Meryl Streep	Katharine Graham	The Post	
2017	Michelle Williams	Gail Harris	All the Money in the World	
2018	Glenn Close	Joan Castleman	The Wife	
2018	Lady Gaga	Ally Maine	A Star Is Born	
2018	Nicole Kidman	Erin Bell	Destroyer	
2018	Melissa McCarthy	Lee Israel	Can You Ever Forgive Me?	
2018	Rosamund Pike	Marie Colvin	A Private War	
2019	Renée Zellweger †	Judy Garland	Judy	
2019	Cynthia Erivo	Harriet Tubman	Harriet	
2019	Scarlett Johansson	Nicole Barber	Marriage Story	
2019	Saoirse Ronan	Josephine "Jo" March	Little Women	
2019	Charlize Theron	Megyn Kelly	Bombshell	

=== 2020s ===
Year	Actress	Role(s)	Film	Ref.
2020	Andra Day	Billie Holiday	The United States vs. Billie Holiday	
2020	Viola Davis	Ma Rainey	Ma Rainey's Black Bottom	
2020	Vanessa Kirby	Martha Weiss	Pieces of a Woman	
2020	Frances McDormand †	Fern	Nomadland	
2020	Carey Mulligan	Cassandra "Cassie" Thomas	Promising Young Woman	
2021	Nicole Kidman	Lucille Ball	Being the Ricardos	
2021	Jessica Chastain †	Tammy Faye Bakker	The Eyes of Tammy Faye	
2021	Olivia Colman	Leda Caruso	The Lost Daughter	
2021	Lady Gaga	Patrizia Reggiani	House of Gucci	
2021	Kristen Stewart	Princess Diana	Spencer	
2022	Cate Blanchett	Lydia Tár	Tár	
2022	Olivia Colman	Hilary Small	Empire of Light	
2022	Viola Davis	General Nanisca	The Woman King	
2022	Ana de Armas	Norma Jeane Mortenson / Marilyn Monroe	Blonde	
2022	Michelle Williams	Mitzi Fabelman	The Fabelmans	
2023	Lily Gladstone	Mollie Burkhart	Killers of the Flower Moon	
2023	Annette Bening	Diana Nyad	Nyad	
2023	Sandra Hüller	Sandra Voyter	Anatomy of a Fall	
2023	Greta Lee	Nora Moon	Past Lives	
2023	Carey Mulligan	Felicia Montealegre Bernstein	Maestro	
2023	Cailee Spaeny	Priscilla Presley	Priscilla	
2024	Fernanda Torres	Eunice Paiva	I'm Still Here	
2024	Pamela Anderson	Shelly Gardner	The Last Showgirl	
2024	Angelina Jolie	Maria Callas	Maria	
2024	Nicole Kidman	Romy Mathis	Babygirl	
2024	Tilda Swinton	Martha Hunt	The Room Next Door	
2024	Kate Winslet	Lee Miller	Lee	
2025	Jessie Buckley †	Agnes Shakespeare	Hamnet	
2025	Jennifer Lawrence	Grace	Die My Love	
2025	Renate Reinsve	Nora Borg	Sentimental Value	
2025	Julia Roberts	Alma Imhoff	After the Hunt	
2025	Tessa Thompson	Hedda Gabler	Hedda	
2025	Eva Victor	Agnes Ward	Sorry, Baby	

== Multiple wins and nominations ==
=== Multiple wins ===
Wins	Actress
3	Ingrid Bergman (Note: Won the award in consecutive years)
3	Cate Blanchett
3	Jane Fonda
3	Meryl Streep
2	Sally Field
2	Jodie Foster
2	Nicole Kidman
2	Shirley MacLaine
2	Geraldine Page
2	Rosalind Russell
2	Hilary Swank
2	Joanne Woodward
2	Jane Wyman

=== Multiple nominations ===
Nominations	Actress
14	Meryl Streep
8	Nicole Kidman
6	Cate Blanchett
6	Faye Dunaway
6	Katharine Hepburn
6	Geraldine Page
5	Anne Bancroft
5	Ingrid Bergman
5	Jane Fonda
5	Jodie Foster
5	Glenda Jackson
5	Jessica Lange
5	Susan Sarandon
5	Kate Winslet
5	Joanne Woodward
4	Ellen Burstyn
4	Jessica Chastain
4	Judi Dench
4	Sally Field
4	Audrey Hepburn
4	Diane Keaton
4	Shirley MacLaine
4	Michelle Pfeiffer
4	Sissy Spacek
4	Elizabeth Taylor
4	Emma Thompson
4	Liv Ullmann
3	Annette Bening
3	Glenn Close
3	Viola Davis
3	Scarlett Johansson
3	Angelina Jolie
3	Helen Mirren
3	Julianne Moore
3	Carey Mulligan
3	Vanessa Redgrave
3	Gena Rowlands
3	Jean Simmons
3	Tilda Swinton
3	Charlize Theron
3	Sigourney Weaver
3	Michelle Williams
3	Debra Winger
3	Natalie Wood
2	Halle Berry
2	Sandra Bullock
2	Leslie Caron
2	Julie Christie
2	Jill Clayburgh
2	Olivia Colman
2	Bette Davis
2	Olivia de Havilland
2	Deborah Kerr
2	Lady Gaga
2	Jennifer Lawrence
2	Anna Magnani
2	Rooney Mara
2	Marsha Mason
2	Frances McDormand
2	Melina Mercouri
2	Rosamund Pike
2	Natalie Portman
2	Lee Remick
2	Julia Roberts
2	Saoirse Ronan
2	Rosalind Russell
2	Kristin Scott Thomas
2	Simone Signoret
2	Maggie Smith
2	Sharon Stone
2	Barbra Streisand
2	Hilary Swank
2	Uma Thurman
2	Emily Watson
2	Shelley Winters
2	Jane Wyman

== Firsts ==
- Anouk Aimée became the first actress to win for a foreign language/non-English language performance in 1967.
- Whoopi Goldberg became the first actress of African descent to win in 1986.
- Marlee Matlin became the first deaf actress to win in 1987.
- Jodie Foster, Shirley MacLaine, and Sigourney Weaver became the only actresses ever to win Golden Globes in a three-way tie in 1988.
- Lily Gladstone became the first actress of Native American heritage to win in 2024.
- Fernanda Torres became the first Latina as well as the first Brazilian actress to win in 2025. Coincidentally, she is the daughter of actress Fernanda Montenegro, who was the first Brazilian actress to be nominated for the award in 1999 with her role in Central Station.

== See also ==
- Academy Award for Best Actress
- Critics' Choice Movie Award for Best Actress
- Independent Spirit Award for Best Female Lead
- BAFTA Award for Best Actress in a Leading Role
- Golden Globe Award for Best Actress – Motion Picture Comedy or Musical
- Screen Actors Guild Award for Outstanding Performance by a Female Actor in a Leading Role
