= National Board of Review Awards 1968 =

Annual US film awards ceremony

40th National Board of Review Awards

January 10, 1969

The 40th National Board of Review Awards were announced on January 10, 1969.

== Top Ten Films ==
1. The Shoes of the Fisherman
2. Romeo and Juliet
3. Yellow Submarine
4. Charly
5. Rachel, Rachel
6. The Subject Was Roses
7. The Lion in Winter
8. Planet of the Apes
9. Oliver!
10. 2001: A Space Odyssey

== Top Foreign Films ==
1. War and Peace
2. Hagbard and Signe
3. Hunger
4. The Two of Us
5. The Bride Wore Black

== Winners ==
- Best Film: The Shoes of the Fisherman
- Best Foreign Film: War and Peace
- Best Actor: Cliff Robertson (Charly)
- Best Actress: Liv Ullmann (Hour of the Wolf, Shame)
- Best Supporting Actor: Leo McKern (The Shoes of the Fisherman)
- Best Supporting Actress: Virginia Maskell (Interlude)
- Best Director: Franco Zeffirelli (Romeo and Juliet)
