= Hour of the Wolf =

1968 Swedish film by Ingmar Bergman

- Theatrical release poster
- Swedish: Vargtimmen
- Literally: The Wolf Hour
- Directed by: Ingmar Bergman
- Written by: Ingmar Bergman
- Produced by: Lars-Owe Carlberg
- Starring: Max von Sydow; Liv Ullmann; Gertrud Fridh; Georg Rydeberg; Erland Josephson; Ingrid Thulin
- Cinematography: Sven Nykvist
- Edited by: Ulla Ryghe
- Music by: Lars Johan Werle
- Production company: Svensk Filmindustri
- Distributed by: Svensk Filmindustri
- Release date: 19 February 1968 (Sweden)
- Running time: 88 minutes
- Country: Sweden
- Language: Swedish
- Box office: $250,000 (U.S.)

Hour of the Wolf (Swedish: Vargtimmen, lit. 'The Wolf Hour') is a 1968 Swedish psychological horror film (Note: The genre has been described as psychological horror, horror, drama, or "folk horror".) directed by Ingmar Bergman and starring Max von Sydow and Liv Ullmann. The story explores the disappearance of fictional painter Johan Borg (von Sydow), who lived on an island with his wife Alma (Ullmann) while plagued with frightening visions and insomnia.

Bergman originally conceived much of the story as part of an unproduced screenplay, The Cannibals, which he abandoned to make the 1966 film Persona. He took inspiration from Wolfgang Amadeus Mozart's 1791 opera The Magic Flute and E. T. A. Hoffmann's 1814 novella The Golden Pot, as well as some of his own nightmares. Principal photography took place at Hovs Hallar, Stockholm and Fårö.

Themes include insanity, particularly as experienced by an artist, sexuality, and relationships, conveyed in a surreal style and with elements of folklore. Analysts have found allusions to vampire and werewolf legend. Authors have also connected the work to Bergman's life and his relationship with Ullmann; Bergman said he was experiencing his own "hour of the wolf" when he conceived the story.

The film was initially met with negative reviews in Sweden. In later years Hour of the Wolf received generally positive reviews and was ranked one of the 50 greatest films ever made in a 2012 directors' poll by the British Film Institute. Filmmaker David Lynch listed it as one of the five films "that have inspired me most... a masterpiece" when including it in his guest curated programme at the American Film Institute in 2010.

The film was followed by Bergman's thematically related films Shame (1968) and The Passion of Anna (1969). Ullmann won awards in 1968 for her performances in both Hour of the Wolf and Shame.

== Plot ==
Painter Johan Borg and his pregnant young wife Alma live on the small island of Baltrum. He shares sketches with Alma of frightening visions he has had, and begins to give them names, including the Birdman, the Insects, the Meat-Eaters, the Schoolmaster, and the Lady With a Hat. As his insomnia grows worse, Alma stays awake by his side.

One day, an elderly lady stops by the house and tells Alma to read Johan's diary, which he hides under his bed. Alma discovers that Johan is haunted not only by the real or imaginary strangers, but also by images of his former lover, Veronica Vogler. She also reads that Johan was approached by Baron von Merkens, who lives in a nearby castle. The painter and his wife visit them and their household. After dinner, the baron's wife shows the couple into her bedroom, where she has a portrait of Veronica by Johan. After they leave the castle, Alma expresses to Johan her fears of losing him to the demons, as well as her will to persevere if such were to happen.

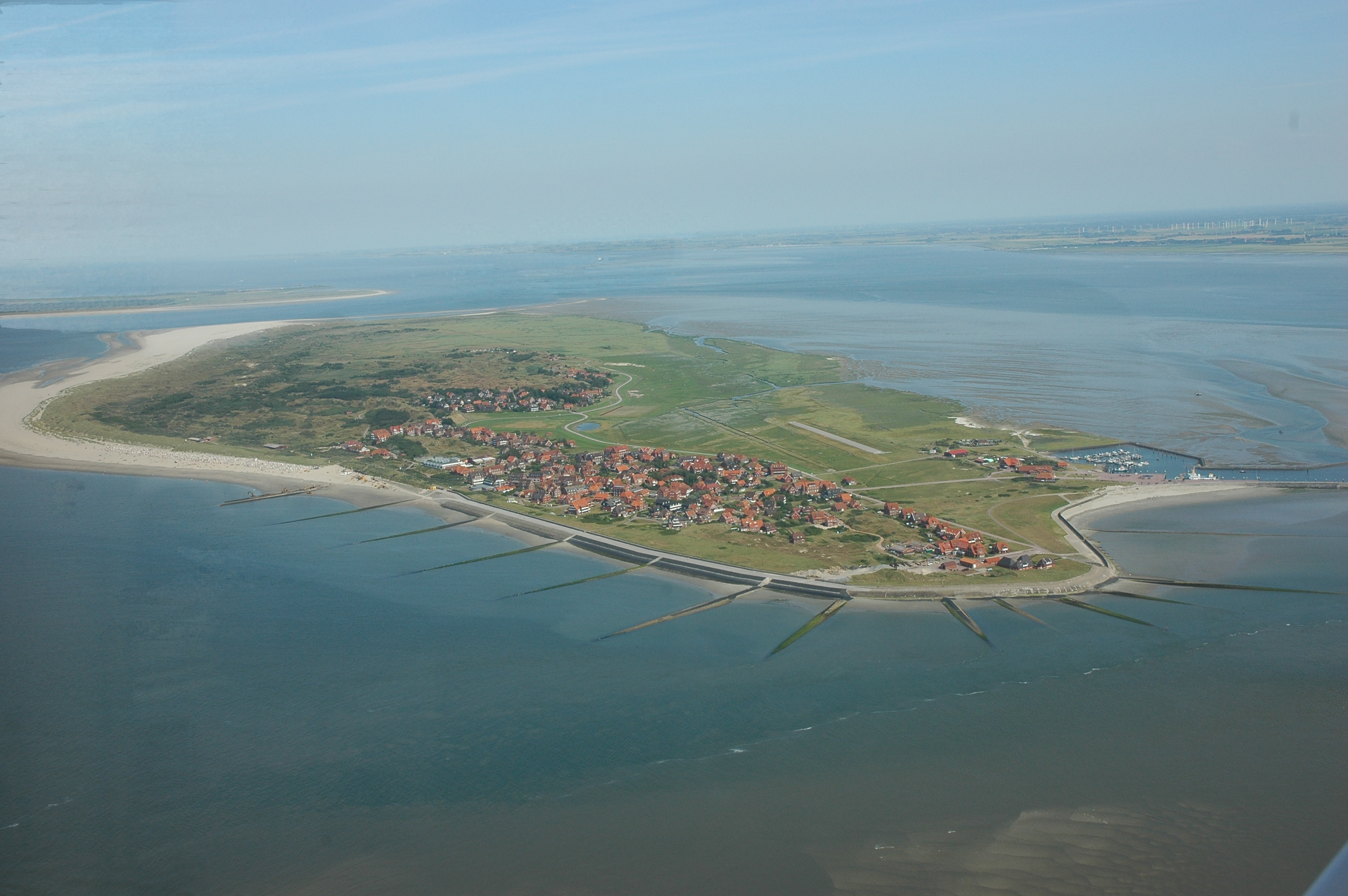
Baltrum is one of the Frisian Islands.

One night, Alma again stays awake with Johan. He tells her of the "vargtimmen" ("Hour of the Wolf"), during which, he says, most births and deaths occur. He also recounts his childhood trauma of being locked into a closet where, as his parents said, a small person lived. He then recalls a confrontation with a small boy while out fishing on the island, which culminated with him killing the boy. Alma is shocked by Johan's confessions.

Heerbrand, one of von Merkens's guests, shows up at the couple's house to invite them to another party at the castle, adding that Veronica Vogler is among the invitees. He places a pistol on the table, for protection against "small animals", and leaves. Johan and Alma begin quarreling over his obsession with Veronica. Johan finally picks up the pistol, shoots Alma and runs to the castle.

Johan attends the party. The baron's guests are revealed to be the demons that Johan described to Alma. As he rushes through the castle searching for Veronica, he meets Lindhorst, who applies cosmetics to his pale face and dresses him in a silk robe. He then leads Johan to her. Johan finds Veronica, who appears to be dead; as he looks over her naked body, she suddenly sits up and laughs. Johan is physically attacked by the demons and flees into underbrush. Alma, who was injured by one of the shots but is only left with a scar, searches the forest for her husband. She witnesses the attacks on him before he finally disappears, leaving her alone in the woods.

Alma later shares her story and her husband's diary. She wonders whether the fact that she and Johan lived together for so long and became so similar was why she could see his Man-Eaters, and whether she would have been better able to protect him if she had loved him less, or more.

== Cast ==
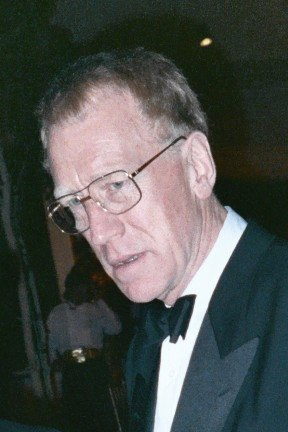
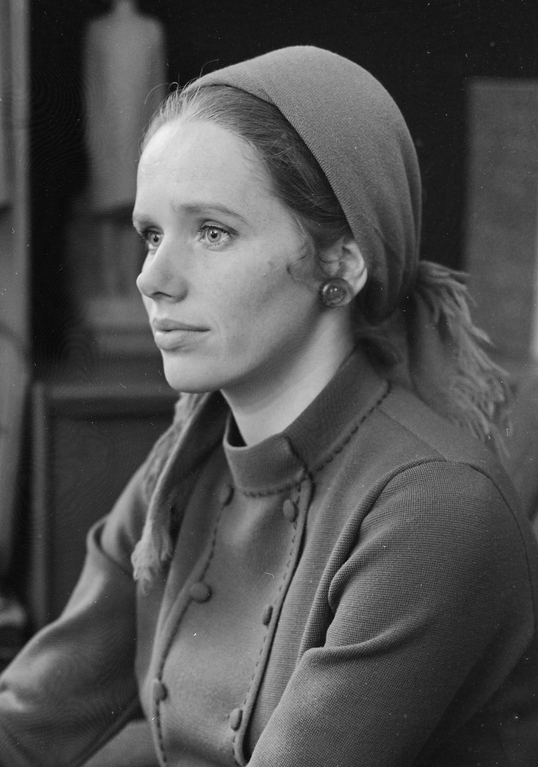
Max von Sydow and Liv Ullmann starred.

The cast includes:

- Max von Sydow as Johan Borg
- Liv Ullmann as Alma Borg
- Gertrud Fridh as Corinne von Merkens
- Georg Rydeberg as Lindhorst
- Erland Josephson as Baron von Merkens
- Naima Wifstrand as Old Lady with Hat
- Ulf Johanson as Heerbrand
- Gudrun Brost as Gamla Fru von Merkens
- Ingrid Thulin as Veronica Vogler

== Themes and interpretations ==
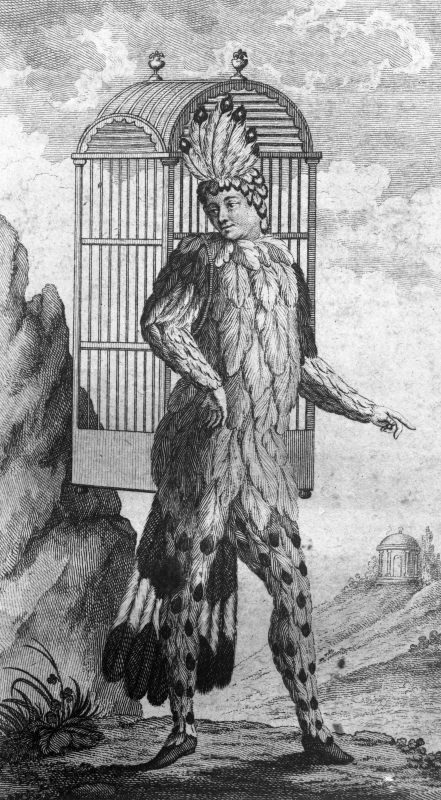
The story and Birdman character were partly influenced by The Magic Flute by Wolfgang Amadeus Mozart.

Johan has been interpreted as "Bergman's alter ego". Professor Frank Gado interprets the film as the "story of an artist's disintegration" (also arguing it reflects "Bergman's own unraveling", and criticizing the film). Author Dan Williams similarly reads it as a "story of the self-destructive artist unable to maintain a relationship with reality". Psychiatrist Barbara Young writes that Hour of the Wolf, like Persona, was about "the disintegration of a personality" (also rejecting Gado's commentary on "Bergman's own unraveling" and instead praising his courage for addressing his issues). The artist's "humiliation" is also depicted. Gado connects Johan to Karin in Bergman's 1961 Through a Glass Darkly, remarking that Johan is at a crossroads where he "must choose between two worlds": real life and his nightmare visions. Gado considers whether Johan may fear he is homosexual, writing Johan's "perversity manifests itself in transvestism, masochism, and necrophilia, yet none of these necessarily indicates homosexuality".

Williams links the artistic visions with "oppression by a group of aristocrats", as the castle's people become vampire-like and "the unreality of Johan's world takes over". Scholar Egil Törnqvist compares what he saw as vampirism in Hour of the Wolf to that in Persona, adding that the portrayals are similar to themes in the work of playwright August Strindberg. Writer Laura Hubner asserts the legend of the werewolf also informed themes of "fission and conflict" and "confused sexuality". According to Hubner, the film's central notion of cannibalism, with a fear of being consumed, is linked to lycanthropy and the legend of Little Red Riding Hood, and these legends are also associated with sexual awakening.

Academic Gordon Thomas discusses a theme of a relationship in which one person's identity is absorbed into another's. Thomas wrote, "the von Merkens et al. are manifestations of Johan's own self-loathing, and Alma, because she loves him, must be present at her husband's phantasmagorical inquisition". Critic Robin Wood compares Hour of the Wolf to Persona in how Alma becomes able to see Johan's "inner horrors", while in Persona Alma is affected by Elisabet's views. While recognizing insanity as a major theme, writer José Teodoro argues another (shared with Bergman's later Shame and The Passion of Anna) is "the realization that it is impossible for any one person to truly know another", with Alma realizing she never understood her husband. Authors have related the story's couple to Bergman's real-life relationships: Thomas theorizes that during production Ullmann was "'at peace' with the world, while her genius boyfriend was not". Young notes Bergman had abandoned his wife Käbi Laretei and son Daniel for Ullmann, yet Hour of the Wolf is dedicated to Laretei, suggesting the story of the disintegrating artist was meant to explain to Laretei why he left them.

Gado identifies the Birdman character as "Bergman's ironic inversion" of The Magic Flute, with Johan stating the Birdman is likely related to the Magic Flute character Papageno. According to Gado, the Birdman represents "corruptive self-knowledge and a 'natural' evil seated in childhood sexuality". Thomas identifies the character Lindhorst as Johan's Birdman. Other writers have found parallels to E. T. A. Hoffmann's The Golden Pot. These include the character names Lindhorst, Heerbrand and Veronica. Gado argues the film's Veronica is more analogous to Hoffmann's character Serpentina than to the literary Veronica, but that the book recognizes Veronica and Serpentina as both being part of "a double image of Woman". Gado adds that, like the book's Veronica and Serpentina, in the film, "Veronica is Alma inverted".

In one scene, Johan describes murdering a boy. Professor Irving Singer wrote that it is ambiguous whether Johan's story is real or imagined. According to Young, Bergman had said the boy represents his own internal "demon" and the boy's struggle with Johan is meant to look "orgasmic". Gado connects the boy to Johan's recollection of his childhood, when he was locked in a closet as a punishment, and believed a little person lived in the closet. Thomas suggests the boy is "the imp of id, an inverse incubus, or a vision of regressive sexuality", and that the murder does not resolve Johan's issues, as after he throws the body into the waters the body floats back to the surface.

== Style ==
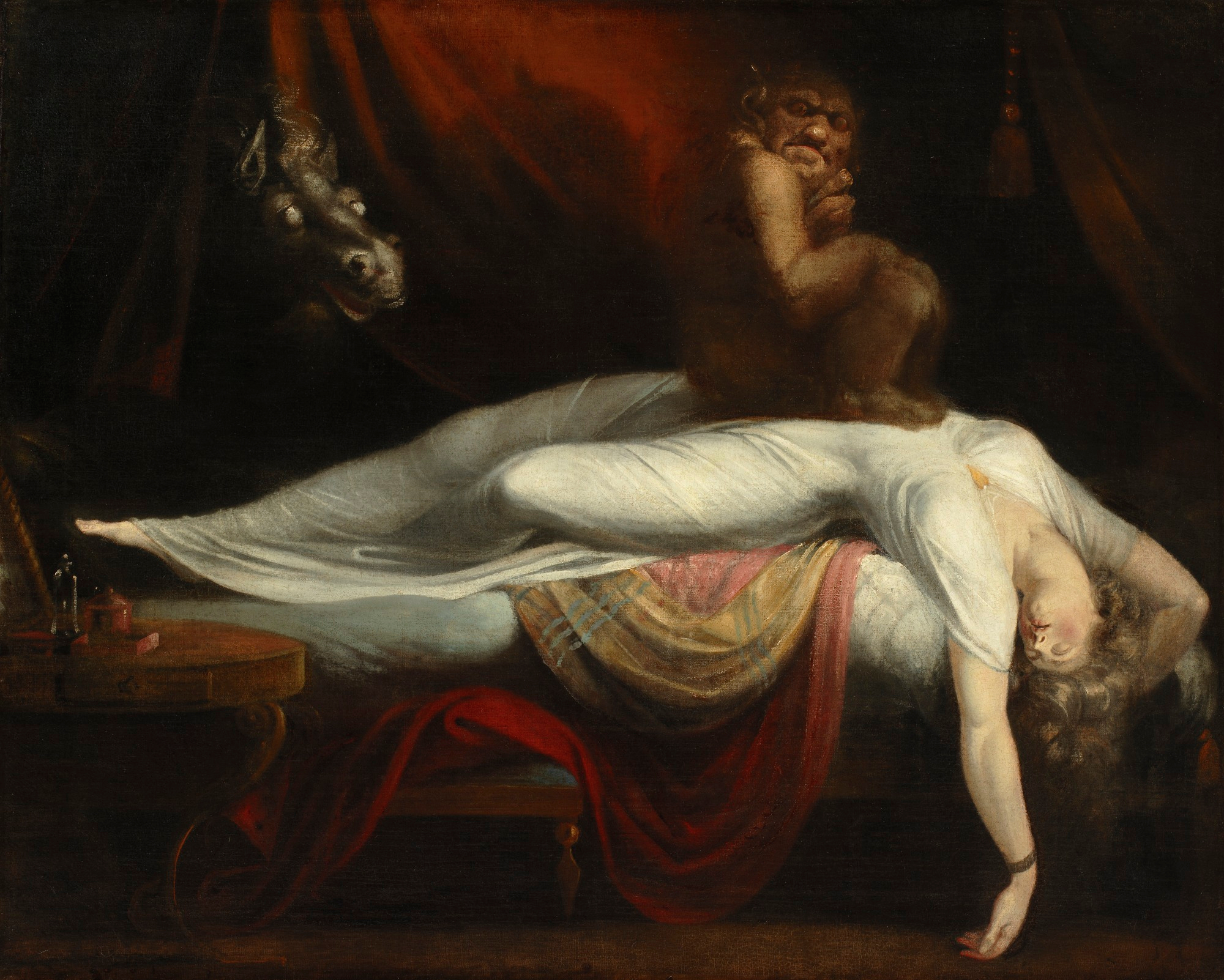
The Nightmare by Henry Fuseli. BFI author Kat Ellinger compared the film to Fuseli's work.

The style of certain scenes has been described as surreal, near-expressionist, or gothic. Professor Fabio Pezzetti Tonion writes that the film's "stylistic ciphers" create "friction between objective and subjective elements". Teodoro describes the film as "eerily hushed", with sparing dialogue accentuating other sounds, and compares its atmosphere to the 1980 film The Shining.

In establishing its mythology, including the boy Johan struggles with and tales of a little person in the closet, Kat Ellinger of the British Film Institute argues Hour of the Wolf draws on folklore. Ellinger further compares the horrific visions to the work of Swiss painter Henry Fuseli. Author John Orr characterizes the film as a "modernist fable". The film's second half takes place only at night, with the exception being the overexposed flashback to Johan and the boy. Hubner argues the overexposure and quick editing of more than 30 shots contribute to the "dreamlike and nightmarish" feel of the scene.

Tonion describes the antagonists as "vampire-like", contributing to the "Strindbergian 'ghost sonata'". Various authors have compared Lindhorst, as played by Georg Rydeberg, and the other antagonists to Dracula actor Bela Lugosi; Bergman was an admirer of the 1931 Dracula. Hubner also suggests allusions to Middle Age folklore and werewolves, opining that Johan's lipstick (after made over by Lindhorst) resembles blood and Johan's leer is that of a wolf's.

Analyzing the opening, Tonion observes the sounds of the crew moving cameras and props and what he presumes to be Bergman preparing Ullmann for her role; this is followed by Ullmann as Alma speaking into the camera, a mise-en-scène repeated at the end. In much the same way as Persona's prologue, this opening breaks the fourth wall. Bergman also uses mise-en-scène to add ambiguity to Alma's meeting with the lady with the hat, with a view of Alma and then a pan to the lady; Tonion argues the cinematography creates doubt when the lady leaves as to whether Alma has been alone the whole time.

== Production ==
=== Development ===
Inspirations for the story included Bergman's recurring nightmares, featuring a woman who took off her own face and an entity that walked on ceilings. Johan's description of being locked in a closet as a boy was based on Bergman's childhood. An external influence was Wolfgang Amadeus Mozart's The Magic Flute, with the opera's character Papageno transformed into an evil Birdman. (Note: Bergman later adapted the opera for screen as the 1975 film The Magic Flute.) Bergman's interpretation of The Magic Flute is echoed through his character Lindhorst. Bergman credited German author E. T. A. Hoffmann as an additional major influence.

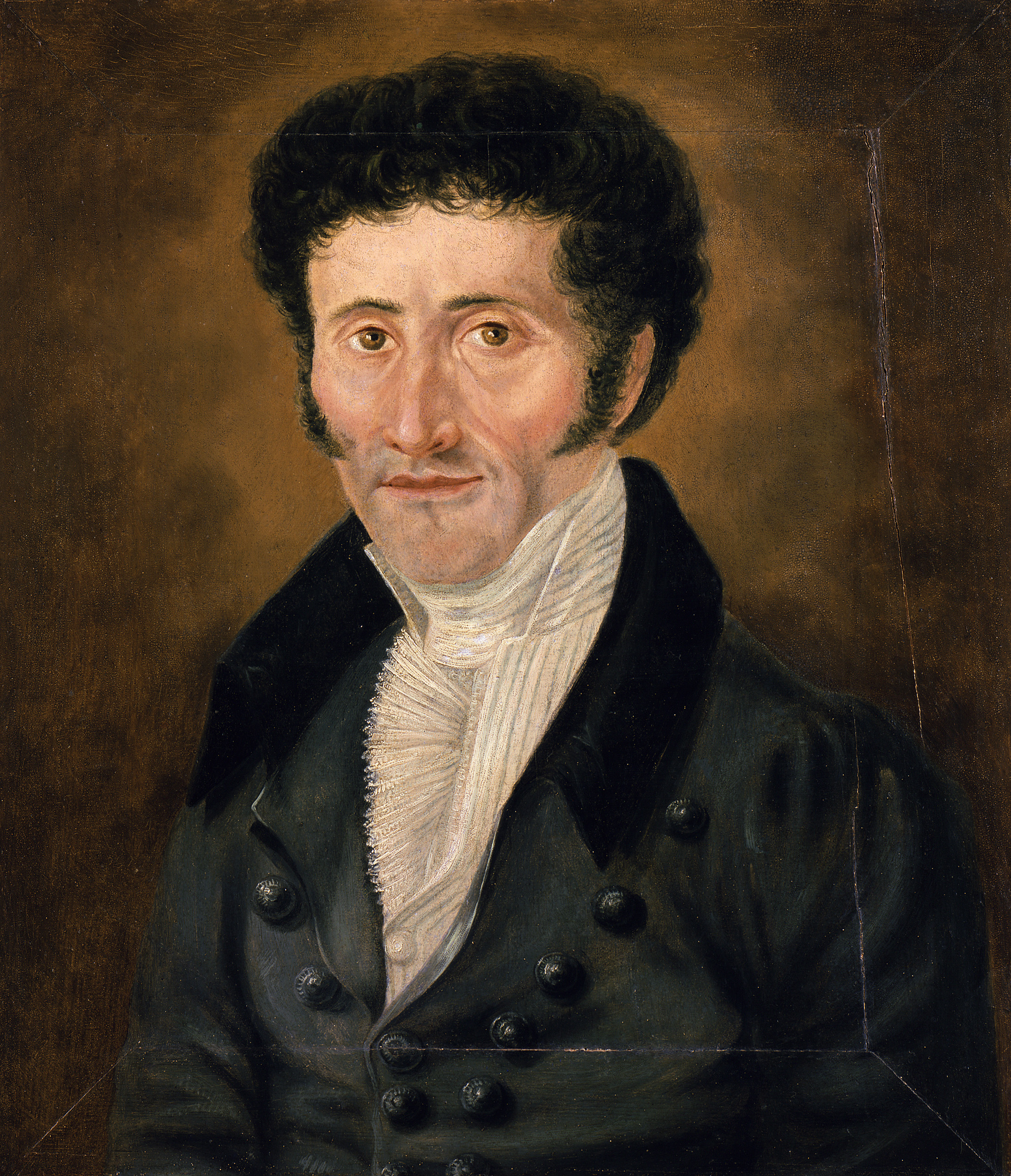
German author E. T. A. Hoffmann was an influence on the story.

Elements of the story also originated from Bergman's manuscript The Cannibals or The Maneaters, which he finished in 1964 and planned to shoot on Hallands Väderö. Bergman abandoned The Cannibals due to pneumonia, after which he wrote and directed Persona instead. Following Persona, he decided to make a reworked version of The Cannibals, under the new title Hour of the Wolf. The term was defined by Bergman in an explanatory note in his screenplay:

The hour between night and dawn ... when most people die, sleep is deepest, nightmares are most real. It is the hour when the sleepless are haunted by their worst anguish, when ghosts and demons are most powerful. The hour of the wolf is also the hour when most babies are born.

According to Professor Birgitta Steene, the title is drawn from Swedish folklore, where the "hour of the wolf" refers to the period from 3 a.m. to 5 a.m., supposedly when the most deaths and births occur. Folklorist Bengt af Klintberg recalled that in 1964, Bergman tasked theatre manager Niklas Brunius to research legend about the hour, and Brunius asked Klintberg about it; Klintberg found the term had no roots in Swedish folklore, though there was a "ghost hour" between midnight and 1 a.m. Bergman claimed he first came across the term "hour of the wolf" in a Latin source, though he did not identify the source and may have coined the term himself. (Note: Like Professor Frank Gado, author Mattias Hagberg believed Bermgan invented the term; Hagberg further suggested Bergman was inspired by the 1927 novel Steppenwolf by Hermann Hesse, in which the protagonist visits a magic theatre.) He later said that at the time of the story's conception, he was experiencing his own "hour of the wolf", and was "freed" from it upon the production's completion.

During the latter stages of post-production of Persona in 1966, Bergman held a meeting to begin planning Hour of the Wolf. He later said the film builds on Persona:

Hour of the Wolf is seen by some as a regression after Persona. It isn't that simple. Persona was a breakthrough, a success that gave me the courage to keep on searching along unknown paths. ... When I see it today, I understand that it is about a deep-seated division within me both hidden and carefully monitored, visible in both my earlier and later work. ... Hour of the Wolf is important since it is an attempt to encircle a hard-to-locate set of problems and get inside them.

=== Casting ===
Bergman had planned to cast Bibi Andersson and Liv Ullmann in The Cannibals, having met Ullmann through his regular collaborator Andersson on a Stockholm street. Ullmann placed the meeting in 1964, and said that Bergman recognized her and asked her on the spot if she would like to work with him. Ullmann later became Bergman's lover and became pregnant with their daughter Linn. After a separation Bergman told her he had written a pregnant character, Alma, for her. He mailed her the screenplay for Hour of the Wolf and she returned to Fårö from Norway for the part. (Note: Ullmann explained why she thought she was often cast in Bergman's films: "It was because my face could say what he wanted to say. That made me the one he wanted to work with ... because it was my face and I also understood what he was writing". Before the director's death in 2007, Ullmann starred in 11 of his works and became known as his muse.)

Erland Josephson was busy as a managing director of the Royal Dramatic Theatre, but desired a role in Hour of the Wolf, having seen earlier versions of the Cannibals screenplay and deciding a frightening film would be fun. Naima Wifstrand's part as the lady with the hat was her last film role.

=== Filming ===
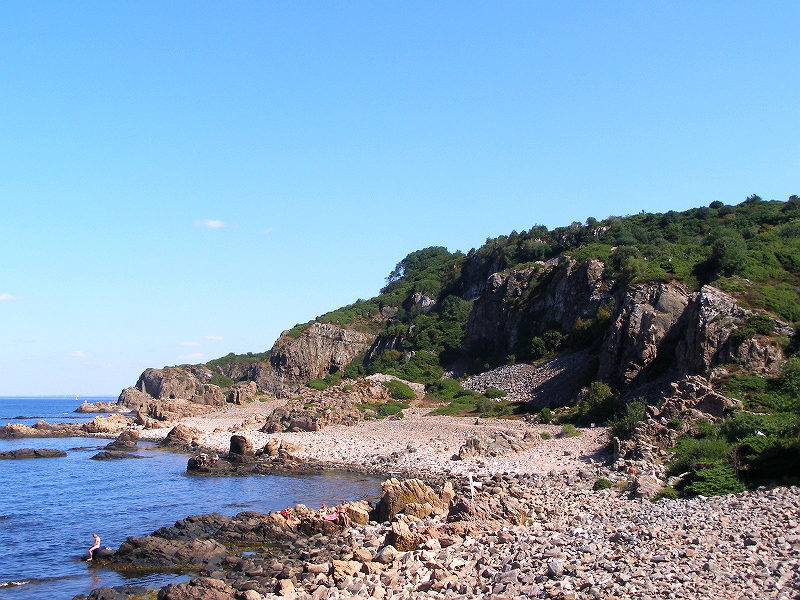
Production took place at Hovs Hallar.

Principal photography took place at Hovs Hallar and Råsunda Studios in Stockholm, and on the island of Fårö. (Note: Bergman used Fårö as a filming location for the first time in his 1961 Through a Glass Darkly, at cinematographer Sven Nykvist's recommendation, and again for Persona. Following Hour of the Wolf, he returned to shooting in Fårö for Shame (1968), The Passion of Anna (1969), Fårö Document (1969) and The Touch (1971). Fårö Document is a documentary, while the others use the island for symbolism and have been termed the "island films".) Hovs Hallar's coast was particularly used for exterior shots. Shooting lasted from 23 May to 23 November 1966.

Ullmann said she had little understanding of the subject matter during production, but recognized Bergman's traits in von Sydow's character. During shooting, including of her monologue scene, she became frightened imagining Bergman could degenerate like the character. She said there were no rehearsals or discussion of the film's meaning. According to von Sydow, Bergman wanted to film the dinner table scene in one take, for the "continuity" actors experience in stage plays. Ultimately, cinematographer Sven Nykvist took a seat in front of the actors at the table and panned quickly, with von Sydow explaining, "it's very difficult to stop each pan at a moment when you have an ideal composition on each person".

The ceiling-walking scene was achieved through trick photography. During production Ullmann left for Norway to give birth, and returned to shoot her last scenes wearing a pillow under her clothes.

=== Post-production ===
Prologue and epilogue scenes along the line of Persona's, acknowledging the story as a work of cinema, were mostly cut during post-production because Bergman felt they became too personal. The only exception was the sound of the film crew talking.

Lars Johan Werle's score is employed only in the latter half of the film, with the music accompanying the scene in which Johan murders a boy employing flutes, clarinets and tubas and then oboes and horns, followed by flutes, trombones and violins. Aside from the music, the boy's screams are the only sound in the scene. Werle's score underwent alterations during recording and in post-production, and some of it was improvised. The soundtrack also includes Partita No. 3 in A minor by Johann Sebastian Bach and The Magic Flute, as recorded by Hungarian conductor Ferenc Fricsay.

== Release ==
Hour of the Wolf was released in Stockholm on 19 February 1968 by Svensk Filmindustri. A U.S. release followed in New York City on 9 April, distributed by Lopert Pictures. It grossed approximately $250,000 in the U.S. At the New York Bergman Festival in May–June 1995, a version was screened with a prologue that had been deleted from previous releases, claiming the film is based on a diary. To mark the centennial of Bergman's birth, Sveriges Television aired the film in 2018 among numerous other works in his filmography.

=== Home media ===
MGM released Hour of the Wolf on DVD both in the U.S. and the UK in single-disc editions and as part of a box set including Shame, The Passion of Anna, The Serpent's Egg and Persona. The U.S. release contains bonus material missing on the UK edition, while the UK box set omits Persona. On 20 November 2018, The Criterion Collection released a Blu-ray version in Region A, along with 38 other Bergman films, in the set Ingmar Bergman's Cinema.

== Reception ==
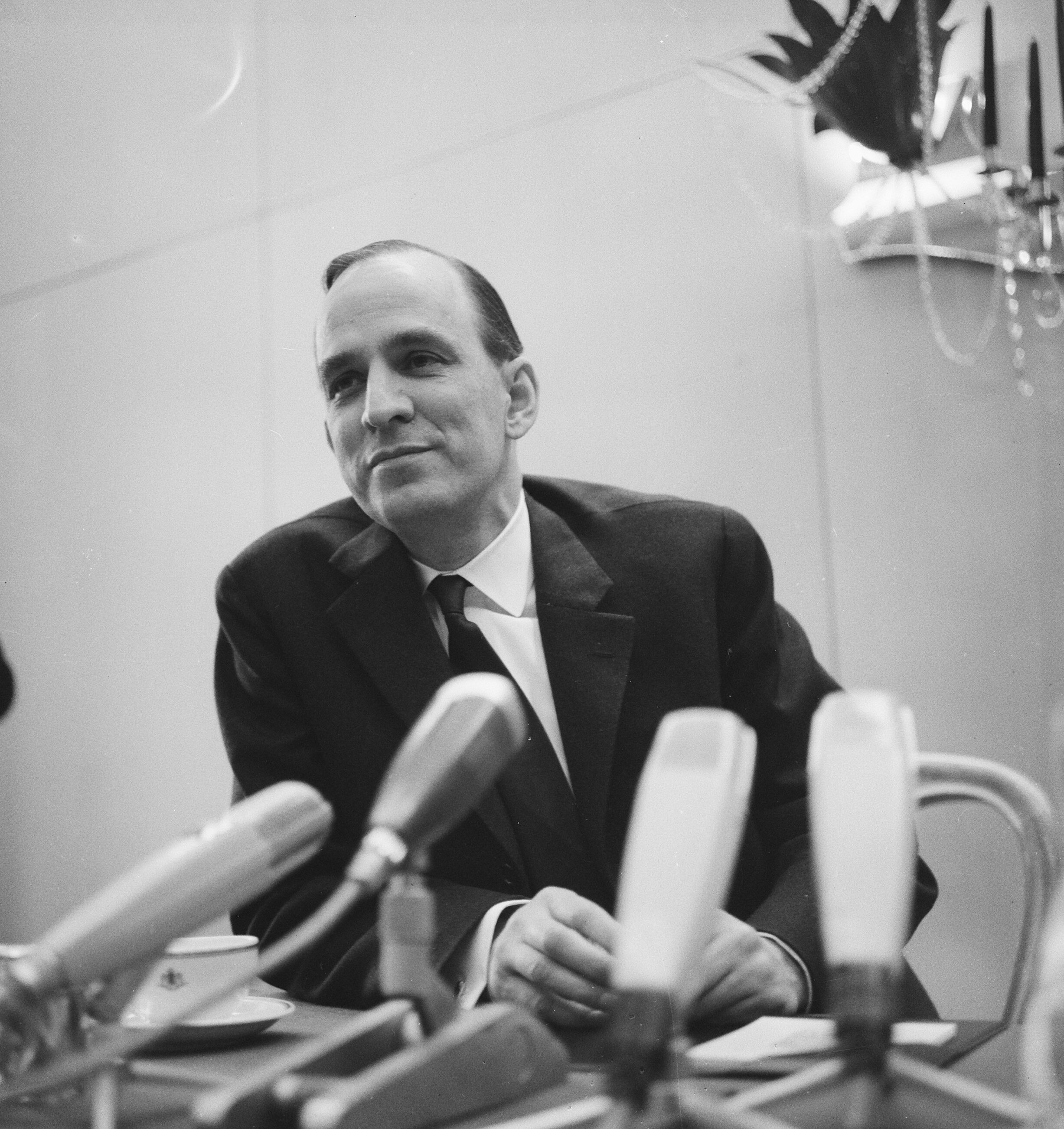
Ingmar Bergman won the 1968 National Society of Film Critics Award for Best Director for both Hour of the Wolf and Shame.

The film met with negative reviews in Sweden, with C.H. Svenstedt of Svenska Dagbladet criticizing Bergman for preaching his message and Dagens Nyheter's Mauritz Edström writing viewers could not identify with the film. For Vecko-Journalen, Stig Ahlgren wrote a piece examining the story's connections to The Magic Flute.

In 1968, Renata Adler from The New York Times opined that it is "not one of Bergman's great films", but positively reviewed the acting of von Sydow, Ullmann and Thulin. Roger Ebert rated Hour of the Wolf three out of four, calling it "a difficult film, and not altogether a successful one", and crediting Bergman with achieving "deeply emotional results with very stark, almost objective, scenes". In New York, Judith Crist called it "a minor effort" from Bergman, not adding much to his past filmography, while crediting it for "stark intellectualizing and lush fantasizing". Time hailed von Sydow as "gothically brilliant" and stated the film cemented Ullmann's position as one of the foremost Scandinavian actresses, also crediting Sven Nykvist for "phosphorescent" cinematography. Critic Richard Schickel judged the visuals "more exciting" than those in Persona, but said Hour of the Wolf appeared to be a "regression".

At the 1968 National Board of Review Awards, Ullmann was named Best Actress for both Hour of the Wolf and Shame. At the 1968 National Society of Film Critics Awards, Ullmann was named Best Actress for both films and Bergman won Best Director for both films.

On the review aggregator website Rotten Tomatoes, 92% of 26 critics' reviews are positive, with an average rating of 7.73/10. The website's consensus reads: "Ingmar Bergman makes a successful foray into horror with Hour of the Wolf, infusing the demons that spring from creativity with his trademark psychological curiosity." In 1992, critic James Monaco rated Hour of the Wolf three out of five, dubbing it a "fine acting exercise". The New Yorker recalled it in 1999 as "probably the darkest of Ingmar Bergman’s journeys into his shadowy interior", mentioning the "ferocity" of the scene where Johan murders a boy. In 2000 Kim Newman of Empire Online praised Hour of the Wolf as "one of the most sinisterly beautiful black-and-white horror films you will ever see". Time Out London called it "a brilliant gothic fantasy".

In the British Film Institute's 2012 Sight & Sound polls, Hour of the Wolf received three critics' votes and 11 directors' votes, placing it at 44th in the latter poll. In his 2014 Movie Guide, Leonard Maltin rated the film three out of four, calling it "lesser Bergman" but with "first-rate" performances. Hour of the Wolf is listed in the film reference book 1001 Movies You Must See Before You Die, which cited references to the work of E. T. A. Hoffmann. IndieWire also named it in 2015 as one of the 15 greatest Bergman films, calling it "not wholly successful" but citing the wall-walking scene (comparing it to the work of David Lynch) and the scene in which Johan murders the boy. Glenn Kenny cited Hour of the Wolf and Bergman's 1963 The Silence as "mesmerizing nightmares" in The New York Times in 2018. Don Druker wrote a negative review for Chicago Reader, assessing it as "outlandish" and "a magnificent failure". In 2021, The film was ranked at No. 43 by Time Out on their list of "The 100 best horror movies".

== Legacy ==
Bergman later made the films Shame (1968) and The Passion of Anna (1969). Author Jerry Vermilye wrote that in exploring "the thread of violence intruding on ordinary lives," Hour of the Wolf, Shame and The Passion of Anna represent a trilogy. Author Amir Cohen-Shalev concurs; the three films are sometimes called the "Fårö trilogy".

WBAI's longest-running radio program takes its name from the film. The "Hour of the Wolf" radio show has run continuously since 1972 and concentrates on the literature of science fiction and fantasy. A stage adaptation of the film also played at the Royal Dramatic Theatre in 2011, directed by Malin Stenberg.

David Cronenberg cited Hour of the Wolf as one of the inspirations behind his film The Fly.

== See also ==
- Witching hour
