= 1968 National Society of Film Critics Awards =

Annual US film award ceremony

3rd NSFC Awards

January 1969

Best Picture:
Shame

The 3rd National Society of Film Critics Awards, given by the National Society of Film Critics in January 1969, honored the best in film for 1968.

== Winners ==
=== Best Picture ===
1. Shame (Skammen)
2. Faces
3. Weekend

=== Best Director ===
- Ingmar Bergman – Shame (Skammen) and Hour of the Wolf (Vargtimmen)

=== Best Actor ===
- Per Oscarsson – Hunger (Sult)

=== Best Actress ===
- Liv Ullmann – Shame (Skammen)

=== Best Supporting Actor ===
- Seymour Cassel – Faces

=== Best Supporting Actress ===
- Billie Whitelaw – Charlie Bubbles

=== Best Screenplay ===
- John Cassavetes – Faces

=== Best Cinematography ===
- William A. Fraker – Bullitt

=== Special Award (for feature-length documentary) ===
- A Face of War
- Warrendale

=== Special Award (for feature-length animation) ===
- Yellow Submarine
