= Shame (1968 film) =

1968 film by Ingmar Bergman

- Theatrical release poster
- Directed by: Ingmar Bergman
- Written by: Ingmar Bergman
- Starring: Liv Ullmann; Max von Sydow; Sigge Fürst; Gunnar Björnstrand
- Cinematography: Sven Nykvist
- Edited by: Ulla Ryghe
- Production company: Cinematograph AB
- Distributed by: Svensk Filmindustri (Sweden); Lopert Pictures Corporation (USA)
- Release date: 29 September 1968
- Running time: 103 minutes
- Country: Sweden
- Language: Swedish
- Box office: $250,000 (US)

Shame (Swedish: Skammen) is a 1968 Swedish drama film written and directed by Ingmar Bergman, and starring Liv Ullmann and Max von Sydow. Ullmann and von Sydow play Eva and Jan, former violinists, a politically uninvolved couple whose home comes under threat by civil war. They are accused by one side of sympathy for the enemy, and their marriage deteriorates while the couple flees. The story explores themes of shame, moral decline, self-loathing and violence.

The film was shot on Fårö, beginning in 1967, employing miniature models for the combat scenes. Shame was shot and released during the Vietnam War, although Bergman denied it was a commentary on the real-life conflict. He instead expressed interest in telling the story of a "little war".

Shame won a few honors, including for Ullmann's performance. It is sometimes considered the second in a series of thematically related films, preceded by Bergman's 1968 Hour of the Wolf, and followed by the 1969 The Passion of Anna. The film was selected as the Swedish entry for the Best Foreign Language Film at the 41st Academy Awards, but was not accepted as a nominee.

== Plot ==
A husband and wife, Jan and Eva Rosenberg, are former violinists who are living on a farm on a rural island during a civil war. Their radio and telephone do not work, and Eva expresses frustration with Jan's apparent preference of escapism from the conflict, while they debate whether they can have children and if Jan is selfish. The couple visit the town, hear a rumor that troops will soon come, and meet with an older man who has been called to duty.

When they return, their home area is bombed, and they see a paratrooper descend on it. Jan and Eva are captured by the invading force and interviewed by a military journalist on camera, for a segment on the viewpoints of the "liberated" population. Eva initially seems indifferent to the conflict, but denies neutrality; Jan declines to speak, and they are released. They are later captured again, and as soldiers interrogate them, the troops play a film of the interview, in which Eva's words have been dubbed over with incriminating speech. This is primarily a scare tactic.

Eventually, they are released by Col. Jacobi, who had formerly served as the mayor. After the couple returns home, their relationship is strained. Jacobi becomes a regular, but uncomfortably constant, visitor who treats them with gifts but also has the power to send the couple to a work camp. Jacobi convinces Eva to provide him with sexual favors in exchange for his bank account savings. They have sex in the greenhouse while Jan is resting. Jan meanwhile wakes, finds Jacobi's savings, and spots Eva and Jacobi leaving the greenhouse. Eva enters alone, while Jacobi turns to leave. She comments to a weeping Jan that he can continue sobbing if he feels it will help. Soldiers soon arrive with a captured Jacobi, who explains his freedom can be bought, as the side of the war who is here is in desperate need of money. Jacobi, the soldiers, and Eva ask Jan for the money. Jan states he does not know what money they are talking about. The soldiers raid the house to look for it, in vain. They hand Jan a gun to execute Jacobi, and he does. After the soldiers leave, Jan reveals he had the money in his pocket, to Eva's disgust. This has split their relationship irreparably and causes repeated breakdowns. The relationship grows silent and cold. When Jan and Eva meet a young soldier, Eva wants to feed him and allow him to sleep. Jan violently takes him away to shoot and rob him.

Eva follows Jan towards the sea, and he uses the money from Jacobi in order to buy them seats on a fishing boat. While at sea, the boat's motor fails. The man steering the boat kills himself by lowering himself overboard. The boat later finds itself stuck in the middle of floating dead bodies, unable to move forward and continue. As the boat takes away the refugees, Eva tells Jan of her dream: she walks down a beautiful city street with a shaded park, until planes come and set fire to the city and its rose vines. She and Jan have had a daughter, whom she is holding in her arms. They watch the roses burn, which she states "wasn't awful because it was so beautiful". She feels she had to remember something, but could not.

== Cast ==
- Liv Ullmann – Eva Rosenberg
- Max von Sydow – Jan Rosenberg
- Sigge Fürst – Filip
- Gunnar Björnstrand – Col. Jacobi
- Birgitta Valberg – Mrs. Jacobi
- Hans Alfredson – Lobelius
- Ingvar Kjellson – Oswald
- Frank Sundström – Chief interrogator
- Ulf Johanson – The doctor
- Vilgot Sjöman – The interviewer
- Bengt Eklund – Guard
- Gösta Prüzelius – The vicar
- Willy Peters – Elder officer
- Barbro Hiort af Ornäs – Woman in the boat
- Agda Helin – Merchant's wife

== Themes ==
Author Jerry Vermilye wrote that in exploring "the thread of violence intruding on ordinary lives", Hour of the Wolf (1968), Shame, and The Passion of Anna represent a trilogy. Author Amir Cohen-Shalev concurred that the films form a trilogy. In particular, Shame depicts the "disintegration of humanity in war". The violence, which author Tarja Laine believed represented a civil war in Sweden, is depicted as "apparently meaningless". Marc Gervais writes that Shame, as a war film, does not address what either of the two sides of the war stand for and does not venture into propaganda or a statement against totalitarianism, instead focusing on "human disintegration, this time extending it to a broader social dimension in the life of one small community". The film delves into the concept of shame, associating it with the "moral failure with the self" bringing about a "traumatic configuration" in character, with Von Sydow's character developing from coward to murderer.

Journalist Camilla Lundberg observed a pattern in Bergman's films that the protagonists are often musicians, though in an interview Bergman claimed he was not aware of such a trend. Author Per F. Broman believed Shame fits this trend in that the characters are violinists, but remarked that music did not seem very relevant to the plot. Laine suggested memories of playing the violin represent an "if-only" theme, in which the characters imagine a better life they could have had. Cohen-Shalev wrote that, like Persona and The Passion of Anna, Shame follows an "artist as fugitive" theme touching on issues of guilt and self-hatred.

Critic Renata Adler believed that "The 'Shame' of the title is God's". However, other authors believe the film differs from Bergman's earlier works, inasmuch as it is less concerned with God.

== Production ==
=== Development ===
Ingmar Bergman wrote the screenplay for Shame, completing it in spring 1967. He explained the origin of the story:

For a long time before making this film I had carried around the notion of trying to focus on the 'little war', the war that exist on the periphery where there is total confusion, and nobody knows what is actually going on. If I had been more patient when writing the script, I would have depicted this 'little war' in a better way. I did not have that patience.

The controversial Vietnam War was being fought at the time, and while Bergman denied the film was a statement on the conflict, he remarked that "Privately, my view of the war in Vietnam is clear. The war should have been over a long time ago and the Americans gone". He also stated "As an artist, I am horror-stricken by what is happening in the world". He envisioned Jan and Eva as Social Democrats, for that party subsidized culture.

=== Filming ===
Shooting began in September 1967. The film was shot on the island of Fårö, where the filmmakers had a house built to portray the Rosenberg residence. The war scenes required trompe-l'œil effects, with Bergman and cinematographer Sven Nykvist burning miniature churches and making small streams look like violent rivers. Nykvist also employed a substantial number of shots with hand-held cameras and zoom lenses. Another location was Visby on Gotland; filming wrapped on 23 November.

After shooting completed, Fårö's environmental regulations required the Rosenberg house be burned, but Bergman had developed an attachment to its appearance and saved it by claiming there were plans to use it in another film. He began writing The Passion of Anna, and with Von Sydow and Ullmann still contracted to work with him, envisioned The Passion of Anna as "virtually a sequel".

== Release ==
The film had its debut at the International Cinema Incontri in Sorrento, Italy, which Bergman could not attend due to an ear infection. It opened in Stockholm on 29 September 1968.

In North America, Skammen was released under the title Shame. It opened in New York City on 12 December 1968. MGM released Shame on DVD both in the US and the UK as part of a box set including Hour of the Wolf, The Passion of Anna, The Serpent's Egg and Persona, though the UK box set omits Persona. The Criterion Collection announced a Blu-ray release in Region A for 20 November 2018, along with 38 other Bergman films, in the set Ingmar Bergman's Cinema.

== Reception ==
=== Critical reception ===
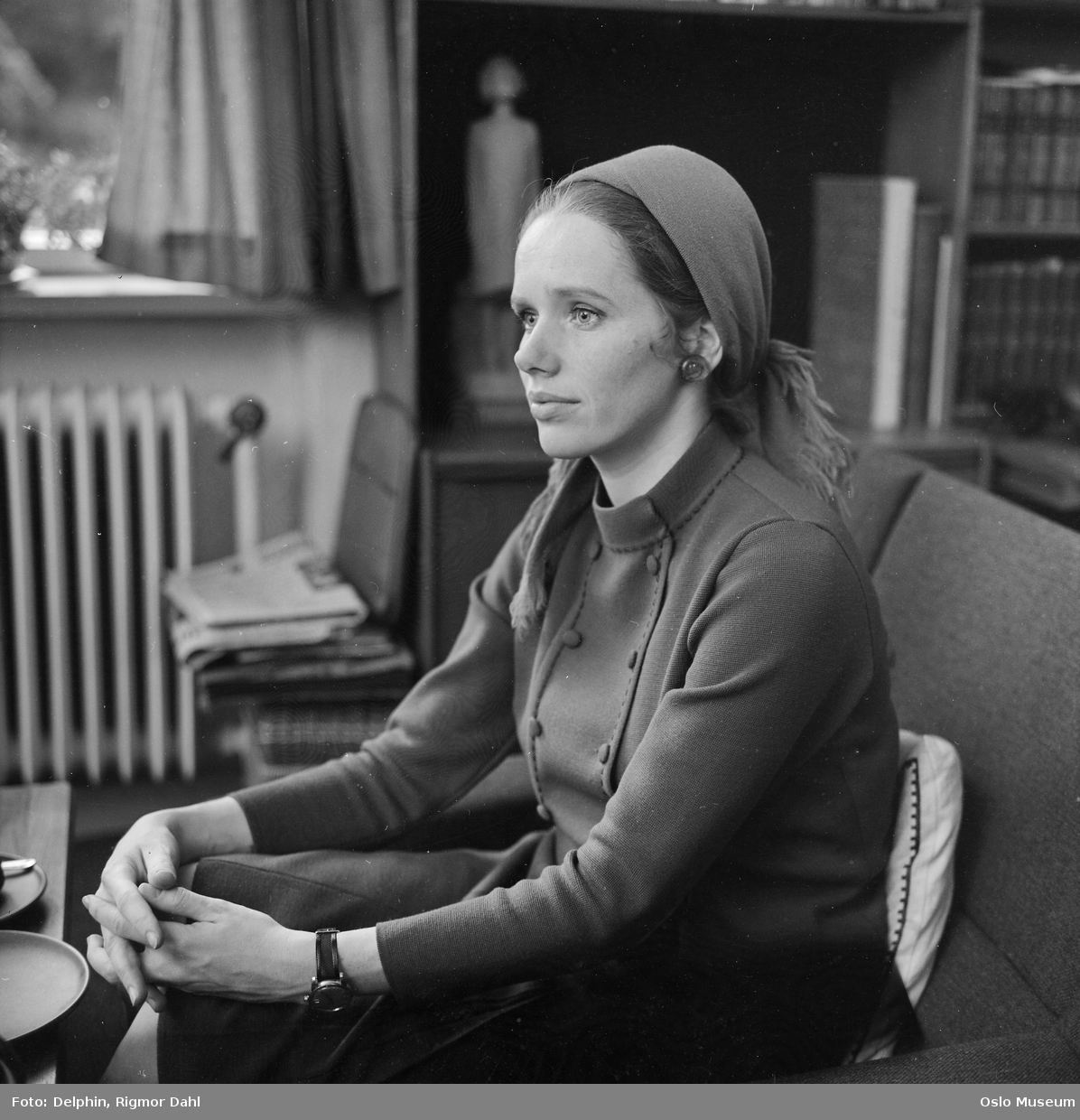
Liv Ullmann's performance was praised by Pauline Kael and she received the Guldbagge Award for Best Actress.

In Sweden, Mauritz Edström wrote in Dagens Nyheter that the film signified Bergman dealing less with his own inner conflict to something more contemporary and more important than one person. Torsten Bergmark, also in Dagens Nyheter, wrote Bergman had found a new message, one of how a person without religion, Jan in this case, is left with self-loathing, while Eva is Bergman's "new solidarity".

In the United States, Pauline Kael reviewed the film in The New Yorker in December 1968. She was an admirer of the film, writing "Shame is a masterpiece, ... a vision of the effect of war on two people". She praised Liv Ullmann as "superb in the demanding central role" and Gunnar Björnstrand as "beautifully restrained as an aging man clinging to the wreckage of his life". Renata Adler, writing for The New York Times, called it "Dry, beautifully photographed, almost arid in its inspiration". Judith Crist of New York called it "Bergman's definitive apocalyptic vision, painful and powerful". However, Crist added the kind of people who could learn from it did not usually watch Bergman films. In 1996, Shame was included in Movieline magazine's "100 Greatest Foreign Films".

In 2008, Roger Ebert gave Shame four stars, noting its timing during the Vietnam War and calling it "angry and bleak film that was against all war" and "a portrait of a couple torn from their secure lives and forced into a horrifying new world of despair". However, he remarked the film was less remembered than other Bergman films at the time of his writing. In 2015, Drew Hunt of the Chicago Reader placed it in Bergman's top five films, judging it "A war film that's not actually about war". The film has a 65% approval rating on Rotten Tomatoes, based on 17 reviews with an average rating of 6.9/10.

=== Accolades ===
The film was selected as the Swedish entry for the Best Foreign Language Film at the 41st Academy Awards, but was not accepted as a nominee. Liv Ullmann won the award for Best Actress at the 6th Guldbagge Awards.

| Award | Date of ceremony | Category | Recipient(s) | Result | Ref(s) |
|---|---|---|---|---|---|
| Golden Globes | 24 February 1969 | Best Foreign Language Film | Shame | Nominated | |
| Guldbagge Awards | 13 October 1969 | Best Actress | Liv Ullmann | Won | |
| National Board of Review | 10 January 1969 | Best Actress | Liv Ullmann | Won | |
| National Board of Review | 1 January 1970 | Best Foreign Language Film | Shame | Won | |
| National Board of Review | 1 January 1970 | Top Foreign Films | Shame | Won | |
| National Society of Film Critics | January 1969 | Best Film | Shame | Won | |
| National Society of Film Critics | January 1969 | Best Director | Ingmar Bergman | Won | |
| National Society of Film Critics | January 1969 | Best Screenplay | Ingmar Bergman | Runner-up | |
| National Society of Film Critics | January 1969 | Best Actress | Liv Ullmann | Won | |
| National Society of Film Critics | January 1969 | Best Cinematography | Sven Nykvist | Runner-up | |

== See also ==
- List of submissions to the 41st Academy Awards for Best Foreign Language Film
- List of Swedish submissions for the Academy Award for Best Foreign Language Film
