= The Passion of Anna =

1969 film by Ingmar Bergman

- Theatrical release poster
- Directed by: Ingmar Bergman
- Written by: Ingmar Bergman
- Produced by: Lars-Owe Carlberg
- Starring: Max von Sydow; Liv Ullmann; Bibi Andersson; Erland Josephson
- Cinematography: Sven Nykvist
- Edited by: Siv Lundgren
- Distributed by: United Artists
- Release date: 10 November 1969
- Running time: 101 minutes
- Country: Sweden
- Language: Swedish

The Passion of Anna (Swedish: En passion – "A passion") is a 1969 Swedish drama film written and directed by Ingmar Bergman, who was awarded Best Director at the 1970 National Society of Film Critics Awards for the film.

== Plot ==
The audience is introduced to Andreas Winkelman, a man living alone and emotionally desolate after the recent breakdown of his marriage. A neighbour, Anna, arrives and asks permission to use his phone. She walks with the aid of a cane. (It is later revealed that her husband and son died as a result of her driving off the road.) While Anna uses Andreas' phone, he eaves-drops on her conversation, after which she departs in tears. Anna has left her handbag behind and Andreas looks through it, finding and reading a letter from her husband that reveals that he is unhappy in their marriage and fearful for possible "psychological and physical violence".

The narrative of the film is periodically interrupted by brief footage of each of the four main actors being interviewed (by an unseen Bergman) about their role-characters.

Andreas takes the handbag to where Anna is living and is greeted at the door by the married couple, Eva and Elis, who are also in the midst of psychological turmoil. Elis is an internationally successful architect and amateur photographer who has an extensive archive of portraits categorised according to emotional states. Elis offers to take pictures of Andreas, to which he agrees.

One night while Elis is away, Eva visits Andreas, as she is bored and lonely and finds it hard to sleep. They listen to music and drink wine, which makes her drowsy. Andreas tucks her up on the sofa and she sleeps for some hours. After she awakes they become intimate and go to bed, although this is hardly shown. Afterwards she explains that during her only pregnancy years ago, she went to the hospital to seek treatment for insomnia. There she was mistakenly injected with an excessive dose, which resulted in the death of the child in her womb. She mentions that she and Elis both wept after this, and it is the only time she has seen him weep.

Elis photographs Andreas. Elis agrees to organise the validation of a bank-loan sought by Andreas and gives him a typing task in order to help Andreas have the funds to pay back the loan. Eva arrives and when left alone with Andreas for a moment, warns him to be "careful" as regards Anna. Elis comes back and Eva asks him why he has a nasty look. He says that he only gets upset by trivialities.

Andreas and Anna are now living together at his house. Anna appears zealous in her faith and steadfast in her search for truth but gradually her delusions come to the surface. She describes a dream of hers, which seems to follow the events of Shame, where she emerges on an island helpless, witness to the horrors of war. For his part Andreas is unable to overcome his feelings of anxiety and disconnection, further dooming his relationship with Anna.

Throughout the film, an unknown person on the island is committing acts of animal cruelty, hanging a dog in a tree and violently killing sheep. A neighbour of Andreas (a loner who some regard as mentally disturbed) is suspected of these crimes. He commits suicide and the police bring a letter to Andreas where the poor man describes how he was beaten and humiliated by a group of men, after which he did not wish to continue living.

One day Anna and Andreas argue as he is chopping wood. He becomes enraged and plunges his axe into the wooden wall close to her head. It is unclear if he intended to kill her, as she screams and dodges it and he slaps her around. Afterwards, as Anna lies in bed, two fire engines rush past the house, sirens wailing. Andreas follows them to the scene of the fire — a farm with livestock. When Andreas arrives he is told that the perpetrator has struck again, this time dousing a horse in petrol and locking it in and setting fire to the stable. The horse was burnt to death. It is now clear that Andreas' friend was innocent and unjustly persecuted.

Anna shows up at the fire in her car. Andreas gets in. Anna drives but says nothing. Andreas insists they should speak the truth to each other. He reveals that he read the letter Anna's husband wrote, so he knows that she has lied about their being happy together. Anna appears to speed up the car. He asks if she is planning to kill him like she killed her husband and son. She drives off the road but he manages to lean across and help stop the car safely. Anna remains silent and Andreas tells her she is out of her mind, that they don't love each other, and that they should part ways. At last, he asks her why she picked him up at the fire and Anna replies: "I came to ask for forgiveness." Andreas gets out of the car and she drives away. In a long shot we see him pace back and forth. As the long shot pulls in to an increasingly grainy close-up, we see Andreas fall to his knees, and, as the screen turns to white, a voice-over states: "This time he was named Andreas Winkelman." The End.

== Cast ==
- Max von Sydow as Andreas Winkelman
- Liv Ullmann as Anna Fromm
- Bibi Andersson as Eva Vergerus
- Erland Josephson as Elis Vergerus
- Erik Hell as Johan Andersson
- Sigge Fürst as Verner
- Britta Brunius as Woman in dream
- Lars-Owe Carlberg as Police officer
- Malin Ek as Woman in dream
- Barbro Hiort af Ornäs as Woman in dream
- Svea Holst as Verner's wife
- Marianne Karlbeck as Woman in dream
- Annika Kronberg as Katarina
- Brita Öberg as Woman in dream
- Brian Wikström as Police officer
- Ingmar Bergman as Narrator (voice) (uncredited)
- Hjördis Petterson as Johan's sister (uncredited)

== Production ==
The film has its origins in Bergman's 1968 film Shame, also starring Ullmann and Von Sydow. After shooting of Shame completed, Fårö's environmental regulations required the house built for the film be burned, but Bergman had developed an attachment to its appearance and saved it by claiming there were plans to use it in another film. He began writing The Passion of Anna, and with Von Sydow and Ullmann still contracted to work with him, envisioned The Passion of Anna as "virtually a sequel."

== Themes ==
Author Jerry Vermilye wrote that in exploring "the thread of violence intruding on ordinary lives," Hour of the Wolf (1968), Shame and The Passion of Anna represent a trilogy. Author Amir Cohen-Shalev concurred the films form a trilogy. Cohen-Shalev wrote that, like Persona and Shame, The Passion of Anna follows an "artist as fugitive" theme touching on issues of guilt and self-hatred.

== Reception ==
On Rotten Tomatoes, The Passion of Anna garnered 100% approval among 15 critics. Vincent Canby argued that "it does seem designed more for the indefatigable Bergman cryptologists (of which I am not one) than for interested, but uncommitted filmgoers", but praised its lead actors' performances and wrote that "Bergman gives each of them extraordinary moments of cinematic truth, monologues of sustained richness and drama". The film was included in "The New York Times Guide to the Best 1,000 Movies Ever Made" in 2002.

The film is not considered one of Bergman's greatest works, but retrospective evaluations are still positive. Sam Jordison wrote for Film4, "While it lacks the lightness of touch and smooth flow that distinguishes Bergman at his finest, this is still a powerful, profound work of art." Roger Ebert gave it four out of four stars and included it in his Top 10 of 1970.
