= National Society of Film Critics Award for Best Director =

Annual US film award

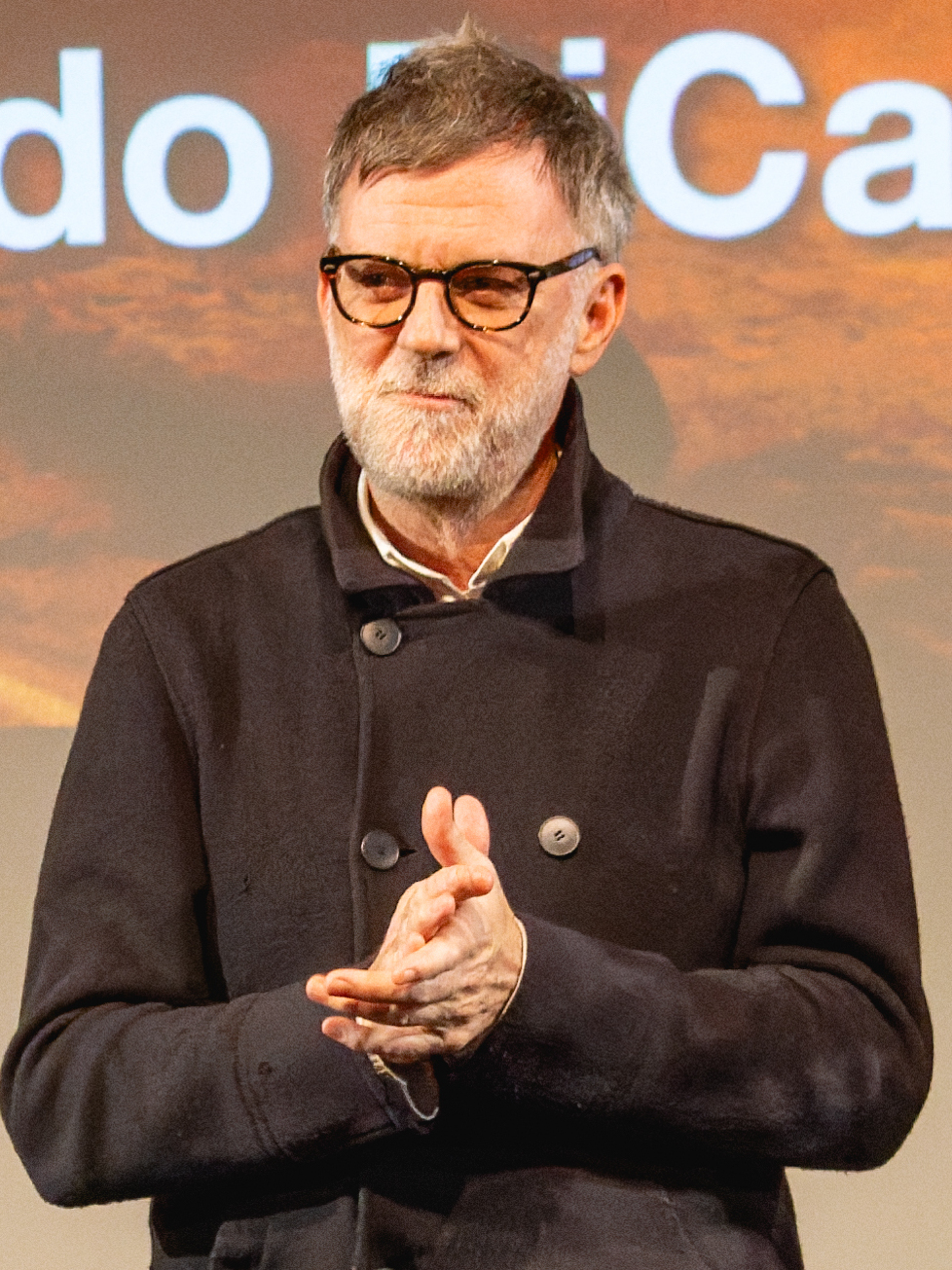
- Current recipient: Paul Thomas Anderson
- Awarded for: Best Director
- Country: United States
- Presented by: National Society of Film Critics
- First award: Michelangelo Antonioni; Blowup (1966)
- Currently held by: Paul Thomas Anderson; One Battle After Another (2025)
- Website: nationalsocietyoffilmcritics.com

The National Society of Film Critics Award for Best Director is an annual award given by National Society of Film Critics to honor the best film director of the year.

== Winners ==
=== 1960s ===
Year	Winner	Film
1966	Michelangelo Antonioni	Blowup
1967	Ingmar Bergman	Persona
1968	Ingmar Bergman	Hour of the Wolf (Vargtimmen)
1968	Ingmar Bergman	Shame (Skammen)
1969	François Truffaut	Stolen Kisses (Baisers volés)

=== 1970s ===
Year	Winner	Film
1970	Ingmar Bergman	The Passion of Anna (En passion)
1971	Bernardo Bertolucci	The Conformist (Il conformista)
1972	Luis Buñuel	The Discreet Charm of the Bourgeoisie (Le charme discret de la bourgeoisie)
1973	François Truffaut	Day for Night (La nuit américaine)
1974	Francis Ford Coppola	The Godfather Part II
1974	Francis Ford Coppola	The Conversation
1975	Robert Altman	Nashville
1976	Martin Scorsese	Taxi Driver
1977	Luis Buñuel	That Obscure Object of Desire (Cet obscur objet du désir)
1978	Terrence Malick	Days of Heaven
1979	Woody Allen	Manhattan
1979	Robert Benton	Kramer vs. Kramer

=== 1980s ===
Year	Winner	Film
1980	Martin Scorsese	Raging Bull
1981	Louis Malle	Atlantic City
1982	Steven Spielberg	E.T. the Extra-Terrestrial
1983	Paolo and Vittorio Taviani	The Night of the Shooting Stars (La notte di San Lorenzo)
1984	Robert Bresson	Money (L'argent)
1985	John Huston	Prizzi's Honor
1986	David Lynch	Blue Velvet
1987	John Boorman	Hope and Glory
1988	Philip Kaufman	The Unbearable Lightness of Being
1989	Gus Van Sant	Drugstore Cowboy

=== 1990s ===
Year	Winner	Film
1990	Martin Scorsese	Goodfellas
1991	David Cronenberg	Naked Lunch
1992	Clint Eastwood	Unforgiven
1993	Steven Spielberg	Schindler's List
1994	Quentin Tarantino	Pulp Fiction
1995	Mike Figgis	Leaving Las Vegas
1996	Lars von Trier	Breaking the Waves
1997	Curtis Hanson	L.A. Confidential
1998	Steven Soderbergh	Out of Sight
1999	Mike Leigh	Topsy-Turvy

=== 2000s ===
Year	Winner	Film
2000	Steven Soderbergh	Erin Brockovich
2000	Steven Soderbergh	Traffic
2001	Robert Altman	Gosford Park
2002	Roman Polanski	The Pianist
2003	Clint Eastwood	Mystic River
2004	Zhang Yimou	Hero (Ying xiong)
2004	Zhang Yimou	House of Flying Daggers (Shi mian mai fu)
2005	David Cronenberg	A History of Violence
2006	Paul Greengrass	United 93
2007	Paul Thomas Anderson	There Will Be Blood
2008	Mike Leigh	Happy-Go-Lucky
2009	Kathryn Bigelow	The Hurt Locker

=== 2010s ===
Year	Winner	Film
2010	David Fincher	The Social Network
2011	Terrence Malick	The Tree of Life
2012	Michael Haneke	Amour
2013	Joel Coen and Ethan Coen	Inside Llewyn Davis
2014	Richard Linklater	Boyhood
2015	Todd Haynes	Carol
2016	Barry Jenkins	Moonlight
2017	Greta Gerwig	Lady Bird
2018	Alfonso Cuarón	Roma
2019	Greta Gerwig	Little Women

=== 2020s ===
Year	Winner	Film	Ref.
2020	Chloé Zhao	Nomadland	
2021	Ryusuke Hamaguchi	Drive My Car (ドライブ・マイ・カー)	
2021	Ryusuke Hamaguchi	Wheel of Fortune and Fantasy (偶然と想像)	
2022	Charlotte Wells	Aftersun	
2023	Jonathan Glazer	The Zone of Interest	
2024	Payal Kapadia	All We Imagine as Light	
2025	Paul Thomas Anderson	One Battle After Another	

== Multiple winners ==
3 wins

- Ingmar Bergman (1967, 1968, 1970)
- Martin Scorsese (1976, 1980, 1990)

2 wins

- Robert Altman (1975, 2001)
- Paul Thomas Anderson (2007, 2025)
- Luis Buñuel (1972, 1977)
- David Cronenberg (1991, 2005)
- Clint Eastwood (1992, 2003)
- Greta Gerwig (2017, 2019)
- Mike Leigh (1999, 2008)
- Terrence Malick (1978, 2011)
- Steven Soderbergh (1998, 2000)
- Steven Spielberg (1982, 1993)
- François Truffaut (1969, 1973)
