= Torekov =

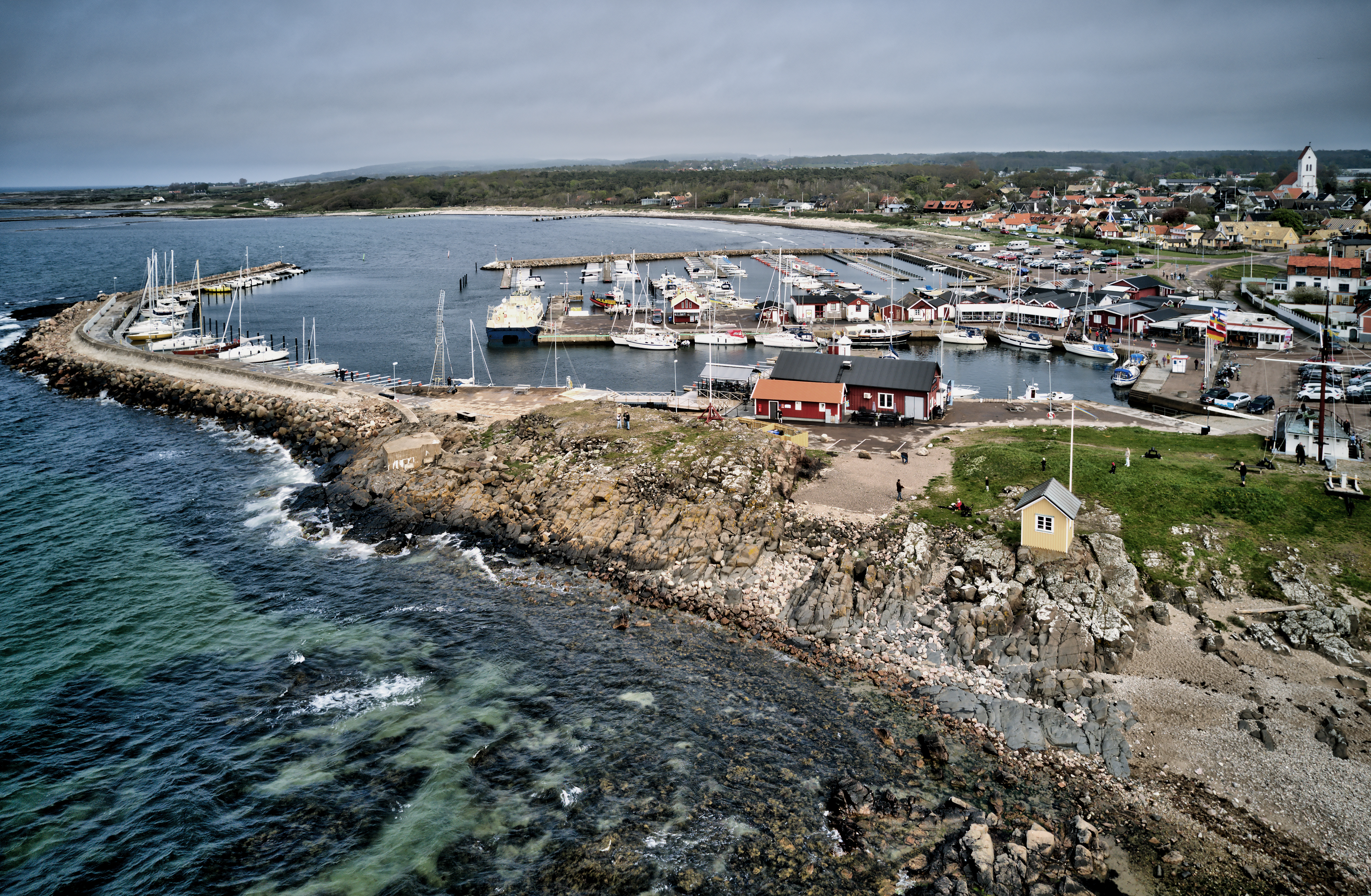
- Coast of Torekov, facing West

- Location within Skåne Location within Sweden
- Coordinates: 56°25′N 12°38′E
- Country: Sweden
- Province: Skåne
- County: Skåne County
- Municipality: Båstad Municipality

Area
  - Total: 1.78 km^{2} (0.69 sq mi)

Population (31 December 2010)
  - Total: 863
  - Density: 485/km^{2} (1,260/sq mi)
- Time zone: UTC+1 (CET)
  - Summer (DST): UTC+2 (CEST)

Torekov (Swedish pronunciation: [ˈtûːrɛˌkɔv]) is a locality situated in Båstad Municipality, Skåne County, Sweden with 863 inhabitants in 2010. It is still a fishing village but it is today known as a summer resort.

In August 1971 Torekov hosted a meeting in which it was decided to strip the king of all but his symbolic formal political powers, known as the "Torekov Compromise".

The walking trail Skåneleden passes through Torekov, connecting it to Hovs hallar to the north and Vejbystrand to the south.

== The name ==
According to an old legend, the town is named after a girl later known as Saint Thora who was drowned by her stepmother, found on the shore of Torekov, and buried by a blind man who then regained his sight. However, the more prosaic explanation refers to two old words thora meaning height, and kove meaning cabin or hut.

== Population From 1960 to 2010 ==
Year	1960	1965	1970	1975	1980	1990	1995	2000	2005	2010
Population	531	512	509	668	822	933	1015	947	888	863
