= National Board of Review Award for Best Actress =

Annual film award

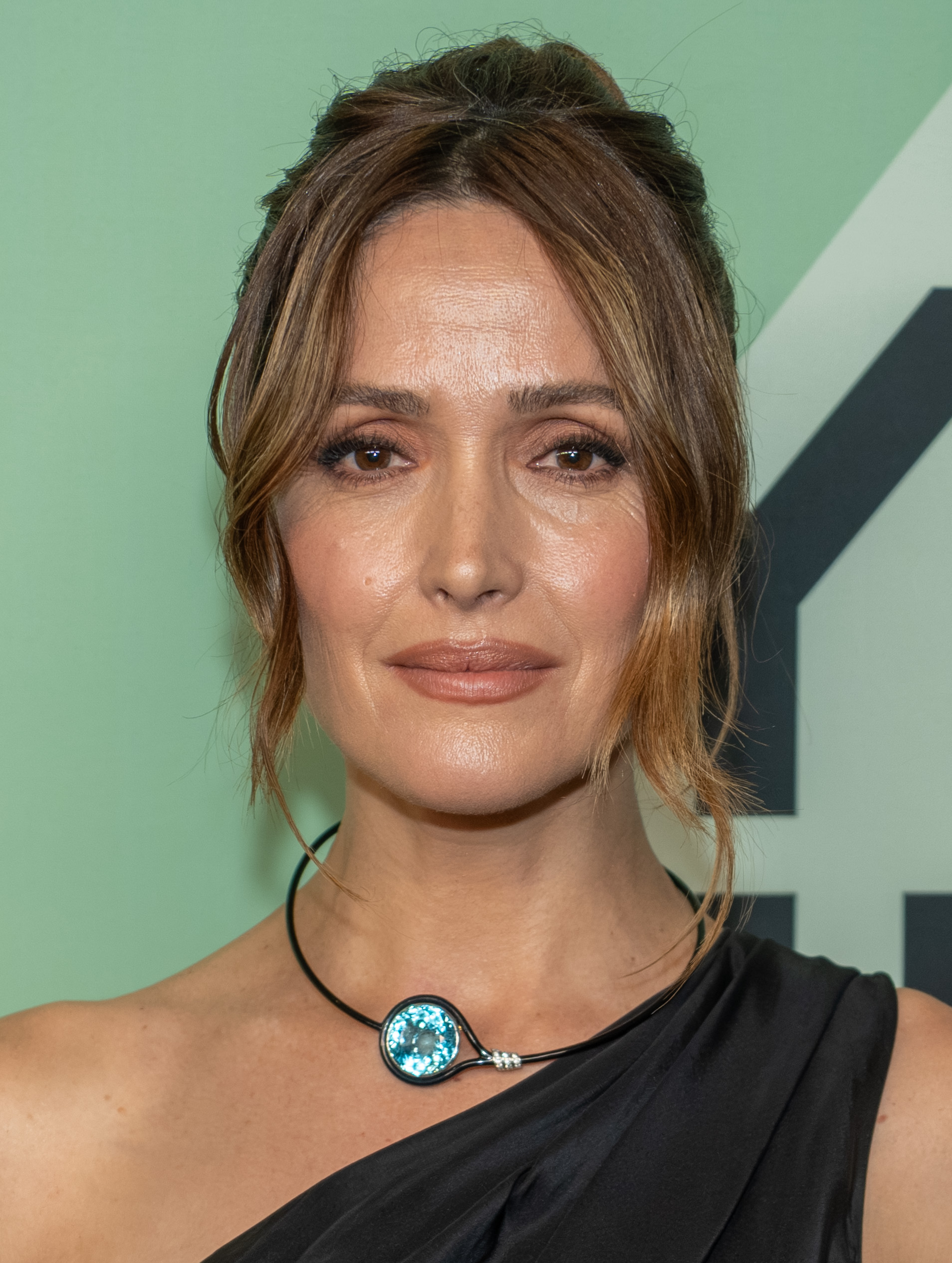
- Current recipient: Rose Byrne
- Awarded for: Best Performance by an Actress in a Leading Role
- Country: United States
- Presented by: National Board of Review
- First award: Joan Crawford; Mildred Pierce (1945)
- Currently held by: Rose Byrne; If I Had Legs I'd Kick You (2025)
- Website: nationalboardofreview.org

The National Board of Review Award for Best Actress is one of the annual film awards given (since 1945) by the National Board of Review of Motion Pictures.

== Winners ==
=== 1940s ===
Year	Winner	Film	Role
1945	Joan Crawford	Mildred Pierce	Mildred Pierce Beragon
1946	Anna Magnani	Rome, Open City	Pina
1947	Celia Johnson	This Happy Breed	Ethel Gibbons
1948	Olivia de Havilland	The Snake Pit	Virginia Stuart Cunningham
1949	Not awarded		

=== 1950s ===
Year	Winner	Film	Role
1950	Gloria Swanson	Sunset Boulevard	Norma Desmond
1951	Jan Sterling	Ace in the Hole	Lorraine Minosa
1952	Shirley Booth	Come Back, Little Sheba	Lola Delaney
1953	Jean Simmons	The Actress	Ruth Gordon Jones
1953	Jean Simmons	The Robe	Diana
1953	Jean Simmons	Young Bess	Princess Elizabeth
1954	Grace Kelly	The Country Girl	Georgie Elgin
1954	Grace Kelly	Dial M for Murder	Margot Mary Wendice
1954	Grace Kelly	Rear Window	Lisa Carol Fremont
1955	Anna Magnani	The Rose Tattoo	Serafina Delle Rose
1956	Dorothy McGuire	Friendly Persuasion	Eliza Birdwell
1957	Joanne Woodward	The Three Faces of Eve	Eve White / Eve Black / Jane
1958	Ingrid Bergman	The Inn of the Sixth Happiness	Gladys Aylward
1959	Simone Signoret	Room at the Top	Alice Aisgill

=== 1960s ===
Year	Winner	Film	Role
1960	Greer Garson	Sunrise at Campobello	Eleanor Roosevelt
1961	Geraldine Page	Summer and Smoke	Alma Winemiller
1962	Anne Bancroft	The Miracle Worker	Anne Sullivan
1963	Patricia Neal	Hud	Alma Brown
1964	Kim Stanley	Séance on a Wet Afternoon	Myra Savage
1965	Julie Christie	Darling	Diana Scott
1965	Julie Christie	Doctor Zhivago	Lara Antipova
1966	Elizabeth Taylor	Who's Afraid of Virginia Woolf?	Martha
1967	Edith Evans	The Whisperers	Maggie Ross
1968	Liv Ullmann	Hour of the Wolf (Vargtimmen)	Alma Borg
1968	Liv Ullmann	Shame (Skammen)	Eva Rosenberg
1969	Geraldine Page	Trilogy	Sook

=== 1970s ===
Year	Winner	Film	Role
1970	Glenda Jackson	Women in Love	Gudrun Brangwen
1971	Irene Papas	The Trojan Women	Helen of Troy
1972	Cicely Tyson	Sounder	Rebecca Morgan
1973	Liv Ullmann	The New Land (Nybyggarna)	Kristina
1974	Gena Rowlands	A Woman Under the Influence	Mabel Longhetti
1975	Isabelle Adjani	The Story of Adele H. (L’histoire d'Adèle H.)	Adèle Hugo / Adèle Lewry
1976	Liv Ullmann	Face to Face (Ansikte mot ansikte)	Dr. Jenny Isaksson
1977	Anne Bancroft	The Turning Point	Emma Jacklin
1978	Ingrid Bergman	Autumn Sonata	Charlotte Andergast
1979	Sally Field	Norma Rae	Norma Rae Webster

=== 1980s ===
Year	Winner	Film	Role
1980	Sissy Spacek	Coal Miner's Daughter	Loretta Lynn
1981	Glenda Jackson	Stevie	Stevie Smith
1982	Meryl Streep	Sophie's Choice	Zofia "Sophie" Zawistowski
1983	Shirley MacLaine	Terms of Endearment	Aurora Greenway
1984	Peggy Ashcroft	A Passage to India	Mrs. Moore
1985	Whoopi Goldberg	The Color Purple	Celie Johnson
1986	Kathleen Turner	Peggy Sue Got Married	Peggy Sue
1987	Lillian Gish	The Whales of August	Sarah Webber
1987	Holly Hunter	Broadcast News	Jane Craig
1988	Jodie Foster	The Accused	Sarah Tobias
1989	Michelle Pfeiffer	The Fabulous Baker Boys	Susie Diamond

=== 1990s ===
Year	Winner	Film	Role
1990	Mia Farrow	Alice	Alice Smith Tate
1991	Geena Davis and Susan Sarandon	Thelma & Louise	Thelma Dickinson and Louise Sawyer
1992	Emma Thompson	Howards End	Margaret Schlegel
1993	Holly Hunter	The Piano	Ada McGrath
1994	Miranda Richardson	Tom & Viv	Vivienne Haigh-Wood Eliot
1995	Emma Thompson	Sense and Sensibility	Elinor Dashwood
1996	Frances McDormand	Fargo	Marge Gunderson
1997	Helena Bonham Carter	The Wings of the Dove	Kate Croy
1998	Fernanda Montenegro	Central Station (Central do Brasil)	Isadora "Dora" Teixeira
1999	Janet McTeer	Tumbleweeds	Mary Jo Walker

=== 2000s ===
Year	Winner	Film	Role
2000	Julia Roberts	Erin Brockovich	Erin Brockovich
2001	Halle Berry	Monster's Ball	Leticia Musgrove
2002	Julianne Moore	Far from Heaven	Cathy Whitaker
2003	Diane Keaton	Something's Gotta Give	Erica Barry
2004	Annette Bening	Being Julia	Julia Lambert
2005	Felicity Huffman	Transamerica	Sabrina "Bree" Osbourne / Stanley Schupak
2006	Helen Mirren	The Queen	Queen Elizabeth II
2007	Julie Christie	Away from Her	Fiona Anderson
2008	Anne Hathaway	Rachel Getting Married	Kym Ryder
2009	Carey Mulligan	An Education	Jenny Mellor

=== 2010s ===
Year	Winner	Film	Role
2010	Lesley Manville	Another Year	Mary Smith
2011	Tilda Swinton	We Need to Talk About Kevin	Eva Khatchadourian
2012	Jessica Chastain	Zero Dark Thirty	Maya
2013	Emma Thompson	Saving Mr. Banks	Pamela "P. L." Travers
2014	Julianne Moore	Still Alice	Dr. Alice Howland
2015	Brie Larson	Room	Joy "Ma" Newsome
2016	Amy Adams	Arrival	Dr. Louise Banks
2017	Meryl Streep	The Post	Katharine Graham
2018	Lady Gaga	A Star Is Born	Ally Maine
2019	Renée Zellweger	Judy	Judy Garland

=== 2020s ===
Year	Winner	Film	Role
2020	Carey Mulligan	Promising Young Woman	Cassandra "Cassie" Thomas
2021	Rachel Zegler	West Side Story	María Vasquez
2022	Michelle Yeoh	Everything Everywhere All At Once	Evelyn Quan Wang
2023	Lily Gladstone	Killers of the Flower Moon	Mollie Kyle
2024	Nicole Kidman	Babygirl	Romy Mathis
2025	Rose Byrne	If I Had Legs I'd Kick You	Linda

== Multiple awards ==
3 wins

- Emma Thompson (1992, 1995, 2013)
- Liv Ullmann (1968, 1973, 1976)

2 wins

- Anne Bancroft (1962, 1977)
- Ingrid Bergman (1958, 1978)
- Julie Christie (1965, 2007)
- Jodie Foster (1988, 1991)
- Holly Hunter (1987, 1993)
- Glenda Jackson (1970, 1981)
- Anna Magnani (1946, 1955)
- Julianne Moore (2002, 2014)
- Carey Mulligan (2009, 2020)
- Geraldine Page (1961, 1969)
- Meryl Streep (1982, 2017)

== See also ==
- New York Film Critics Circle Award for Best Actress
- National Society of Film Critics Award for Best Actress
