= Ulla Ryghe =

Swedish film editor (1924–2011)

- Born: 27 August 1924; Stockholm, Sweden
- Died: 16 April 2011 (aged 86); Victoria, British Columbia, Canada
- Occupation: Film editor

Ulla Ryghe (27 August 1924 – 16 April 2011) was a Swedish film editor known for working with director Ingmar Bergman.

She published her autobiography, Travels in Wonderland: A Memoir, recounting how she grew up in Sweden during World War II before travelling to Cyprus. In the 1960s, she became one of Bergman's recurring "key collaborators". She also had conversations with Bergman and assistant Vilgot Sjöman that influenced the themes in some of Bergman's films. Afterwards, she arrived to Montreal, Quebec, Canada and began working for the National Film Board of Canada.

== Filmography ==
Her films include:

- Through a Glass Darkly (1961)
- Siska (1962)
- Winter Light (1963)
- The Silence (1963)
- The Dress (1964)
- Persona (1966)
- Nightmare (1965)
- Shame (1968)
- Hour of the Wolf (1968)
