= Hovs Hallar =

Nature reserve in Sweden

Coordinates: 56.47°N 12.71°E

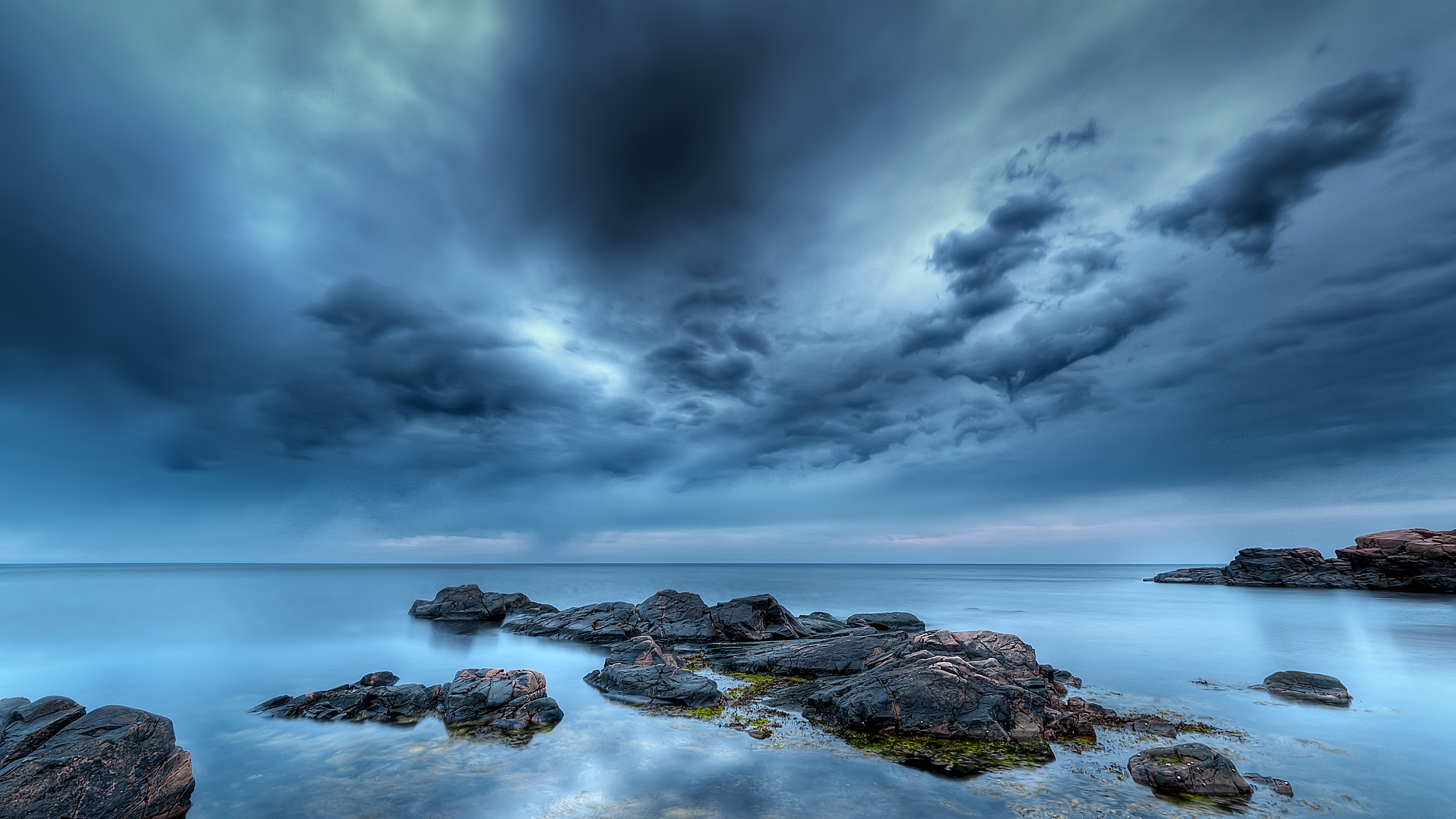
Hovs Hallar with Clouds

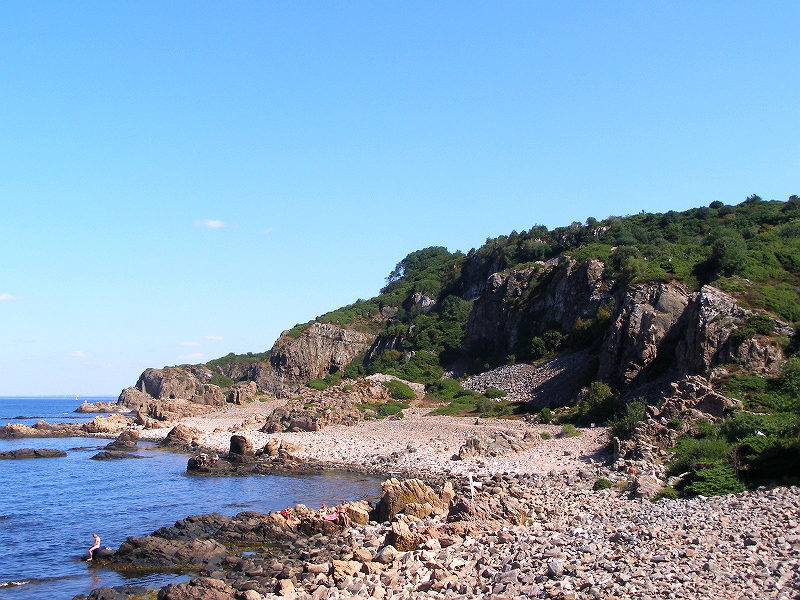
Hovs Hallar

Hovs Hallar (Swedish pronunciation: [ˈhoːvs ˈhâlːar]) is a nature reserve at the northern tip of the Bjäre Peninsula in the county of Skåne, Sweden. It is located approximately 7 km (4.3 mi) northeast of the coastal town of Torekov. The reserve is an area of geological interest and its impressive cliff faces are home to a variety of seabirds. It is assumed that the area gave the name of the province Halland, meaning "the land beyond Hovs Hallar".

Hovs Hallar is also famous as the filming location for the opening scenes of the classic Ingmar Bergman film The Seventh Seal, with the Knight challenging Death to a game of chess for his life on the shoreline, and the closing scene with the Dance Macabre against a stormy sky.

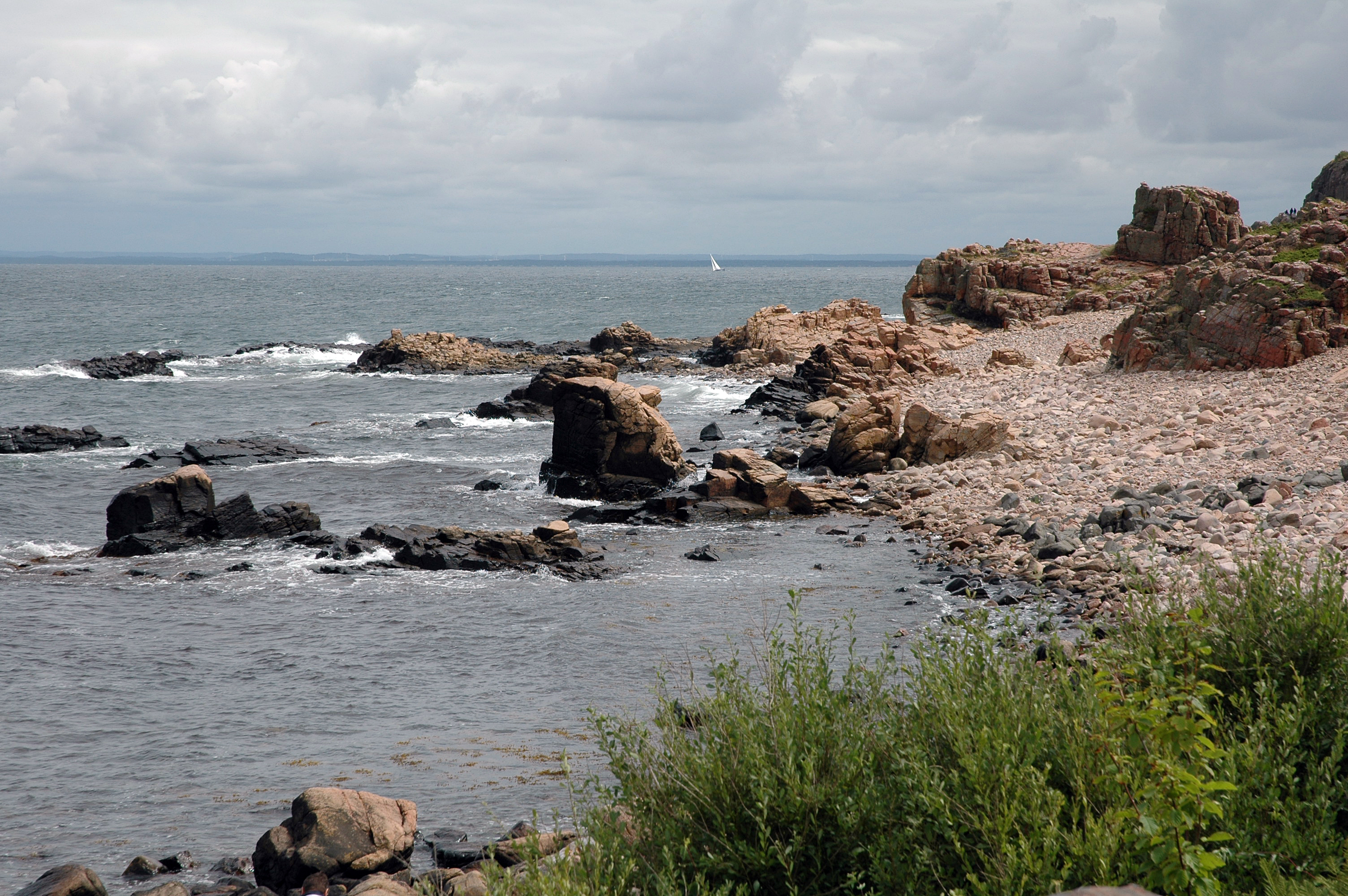

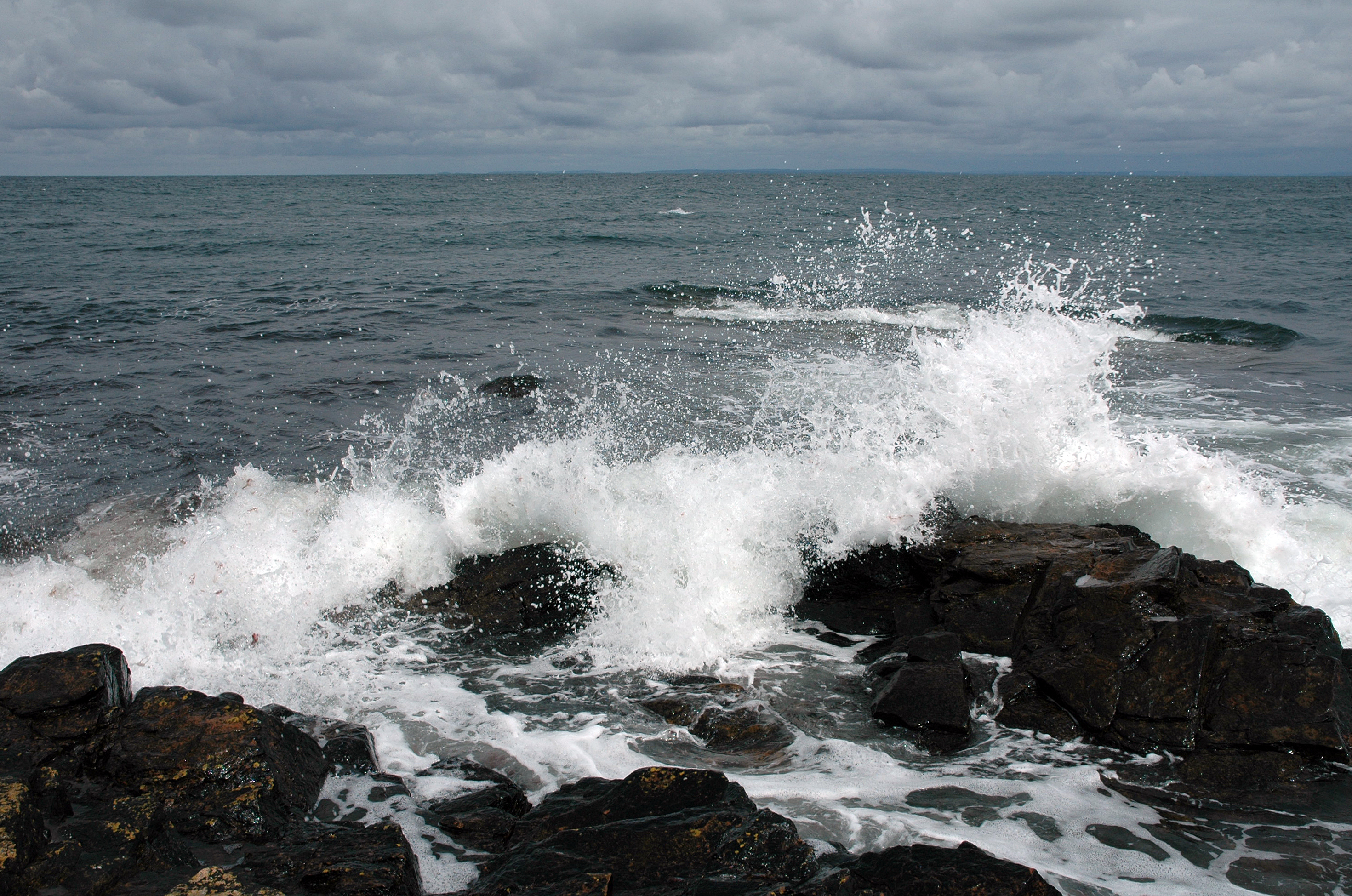

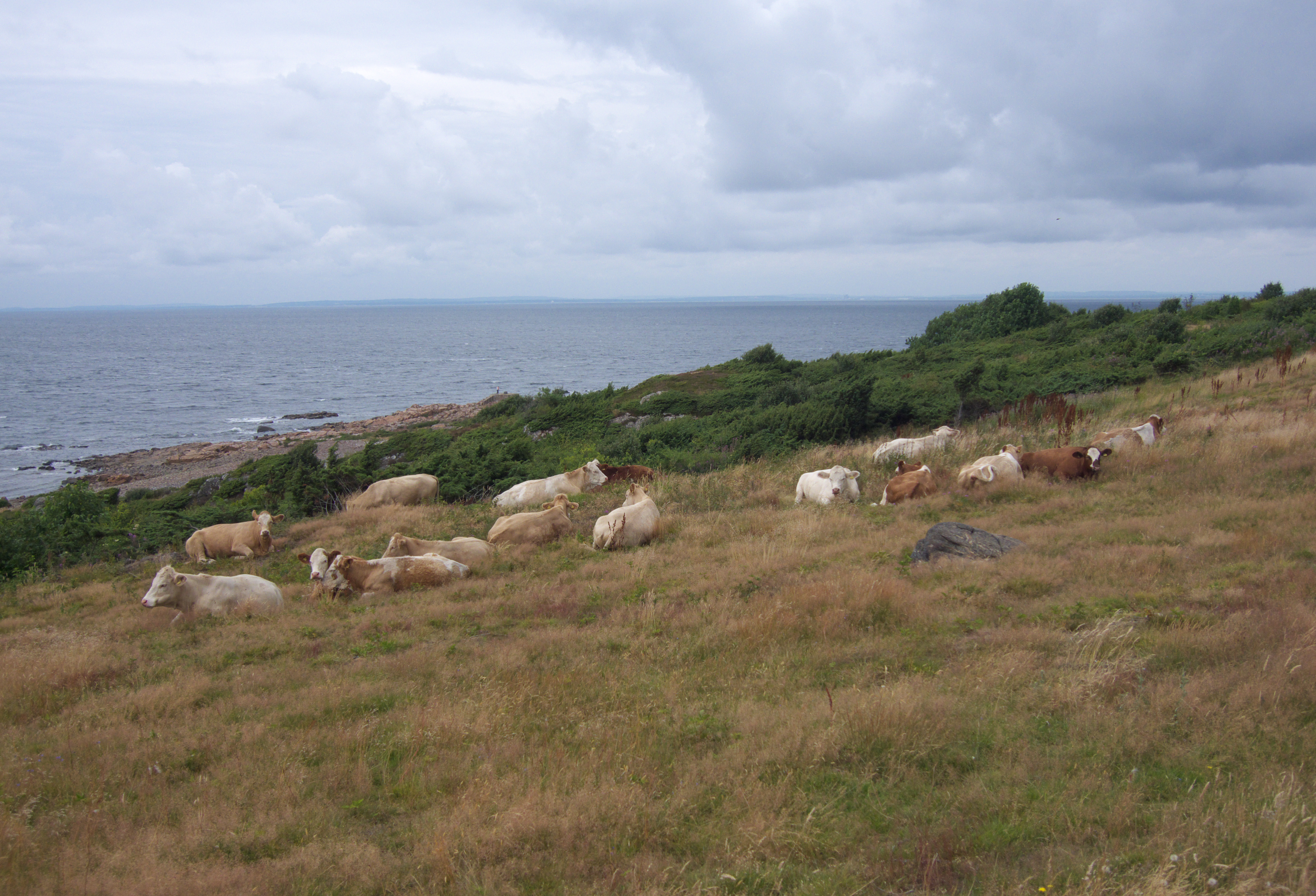
