= Liv Ullmann =

Norwegian actress (born 1938)

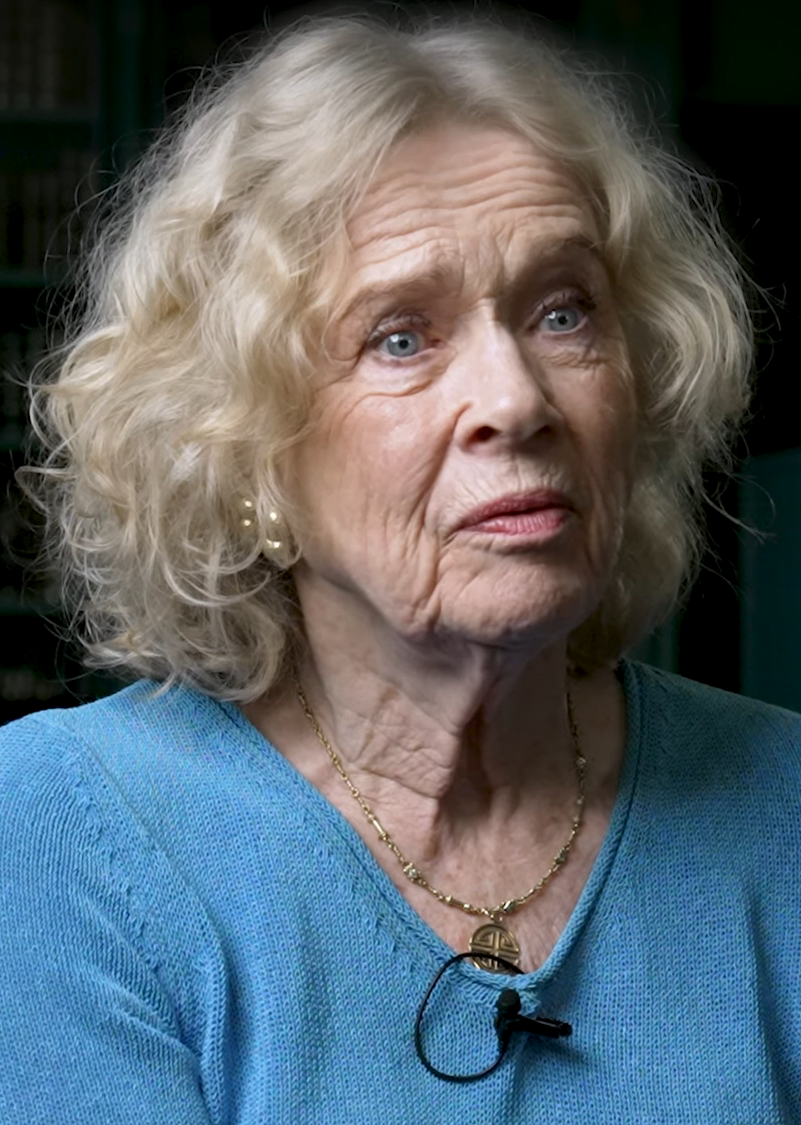
- Ullmann in 2024
- Born: Liv Johanne Ullmann; 16 December 1938 (age 87); Tokyo, Japan
- Occupations: Actress, filmmaker
- Years active: 1957–present
- Spouses: Hans Jakob Stang (m. 1960; div. 1965) Donald Richard Saunders (m. 1985; div. 1995)
- Partner(s): Ingmar Bergman (1965–1970)
- Children: Linn Ullmann
- Relatives: Halfdan Ullmann Tøndel (grandson)

Liv Johanne Ullmann (born 16 December 1938) is a Norwegian actress and filmmaker. Recognised as one of the greatest European actresses of all time, Ullmann is known as the muse and frequent collaborator of filmmaker Ingmar Bergman, whom she dated for five years. She acted in many of his films, including Persona (1966), The Passion of Anna (1969), Cries and Whispers (1972), Scenes from a Marriage (1973), and Autumn Sonata (1978).

Ullmann won a Golden Globe Award for Best Actress in a Motion Picture – Drama in 1972 for the film The Emigrants and has been nominated for another four. In 2000, she was nominated for the Palme d'Or for her second directorial feature film, Faithless. She has received two BAFTA Award nominations, and two nominations for the Academy Award for Best Actress, for The Emigrants and Bergman's Face to Face. On 25 March 2022, Ullmann was presented with an Academy Honorary Award in recognition of her "bravery and emotional transparency that has gifted audiences with deeply affecting screen portrayals".

== Early life ==
Liv Johanne Ullmann was born in Tokyo on 16 December 1938, the daughter of Norwegian parents Janna Erbe (née Lund; 1910–1996) and Erik Viggo Ullmann (1907–1945). Her father was an aircraft engineer who was working in Tokyo at the time. Her grandfather helped Jews escape from the Norwegian town where he lived during World War II, and was thus sent to the Dachau concentration camp, where he died. When Ullmann was two years old, she moved with her parents to Canada and settled in Toronto, where her father worked at the Royal Norwegian Air Force base on Toronto Islands during World War II. The family then moved to the U.S. and settled in New York City, where her father died four years later after a lengthy hospitalisation from head injuries due to being struck by an aeroplane propeller, and his death affected her greatly. Her mother worked as a bookseller while raising Ullmann and her sister alone. In 1945 they returned to Norway and lived in Trondheim.

== Career ==
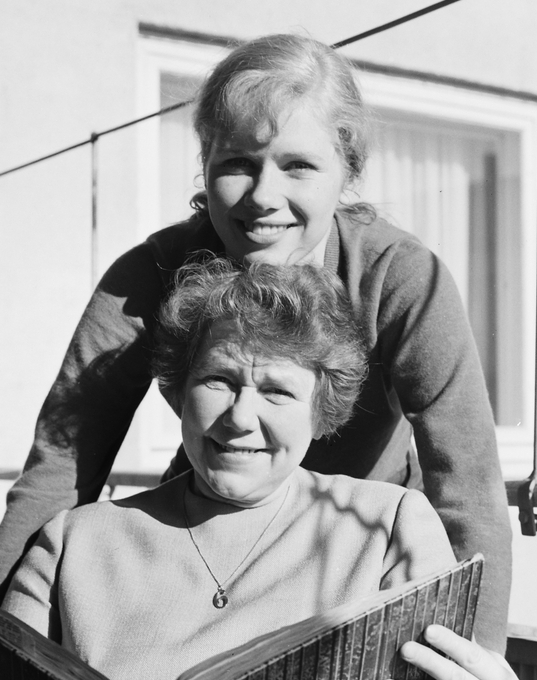
Ullmann with her mother Janna in 1959

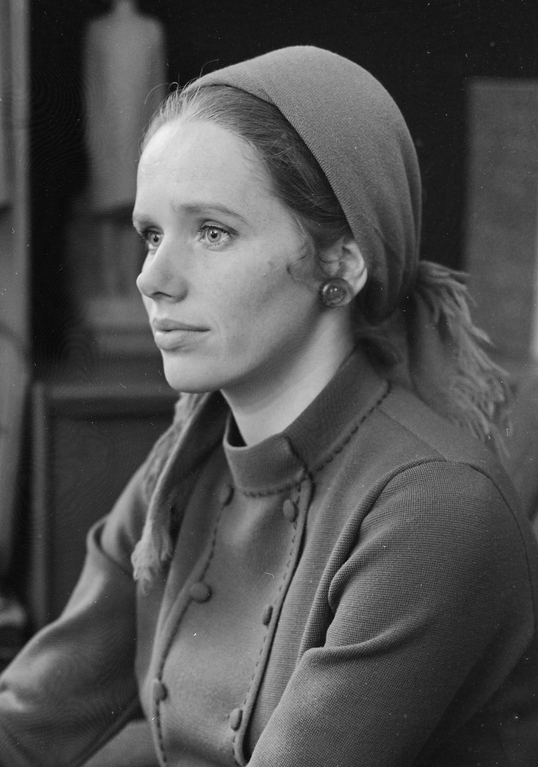
Ullmann in 1966

Ullmann began her acting career as a stage actress in Norway during the mid-1950s. She continued to act in theatre for most of her career and became noted for her portrayal of Nora Helmer in Henrik Ibsen's play A Doll's House.

She became better known once she started to work with Swedish movie director Ingmar Bergman. She later acted, with acclaim, in ten of his movies, including Persona (1966), The Passion of Anna (1969), Cries and Whispers (1972), and Autumn Sonata (1978), in the last of which her co-actress Ingrid Bergman resumed her own Swedish cinema career. She co-acted often with Swedish actor and fellow Bergman collaborator Erland Josephson, with whom she made the Swedish television drama Scenes from a Marriage (1973), which was also edited to feature-movie length and distributed theatrically. Ullmann also acted with Laurence Olivier in A Bridge Too Far (1977), directed by Richard Attenborough.

Nominated more than forty times for awards, including various lifetime achievement awards, she won the best-actress prize three times from the National Society of Film Critics and three times from the National Board of Review, received three awards from the New York Film Critics Circle, and a Golden Globe. During 1971, Ullmann was nominated for an Academy Award for Best Actress for the movie The Emigrants, and again during 1976 for the movie Face to Face.

Ullmann made her New York City stage debut in 1975, also in A Doll's House. Appearances in Anna Christie and Ghosts followed, as well as the less-than-successful musical version of I Remember Mama. This show, composed by Richard Rodgers, experienced numerous revisions during a long preview period, then closed after 108 performances. She also featured in the widely deprecated musical movie remake of Lost Horizon during 1973. In 1977, when she appeared on Broadway at the Imperial Theatre in Eugene O'Neill's Anna Christie, The New York Times said that she "glowed with despair and hope, and was everything one could have wished her to have been" in a performance "not to be missed and never to be forgotten", with her "grace and authority" that was "perhaps more than Garbo...born for Anna Christie:--Or more properly, Anna Christie was born for her."

In 1980, Brian De Palma, who directed Carrie, wanted Ullmann to play the role of Kate Miller in the erotic crime thriller Dressed to Kill and offered it to her, but she declined because of the violence. The role subsequently went to Angie Dickinson. In 1982, Bergman wanted Ullmann to play Emelie Ekdahl in his last feature film, Fanny and Alexander, and wrote the role with her in mind. She declined it, feeling the role was too sad. She later stated in interviews that turning it down was one of the few things she really regretted.

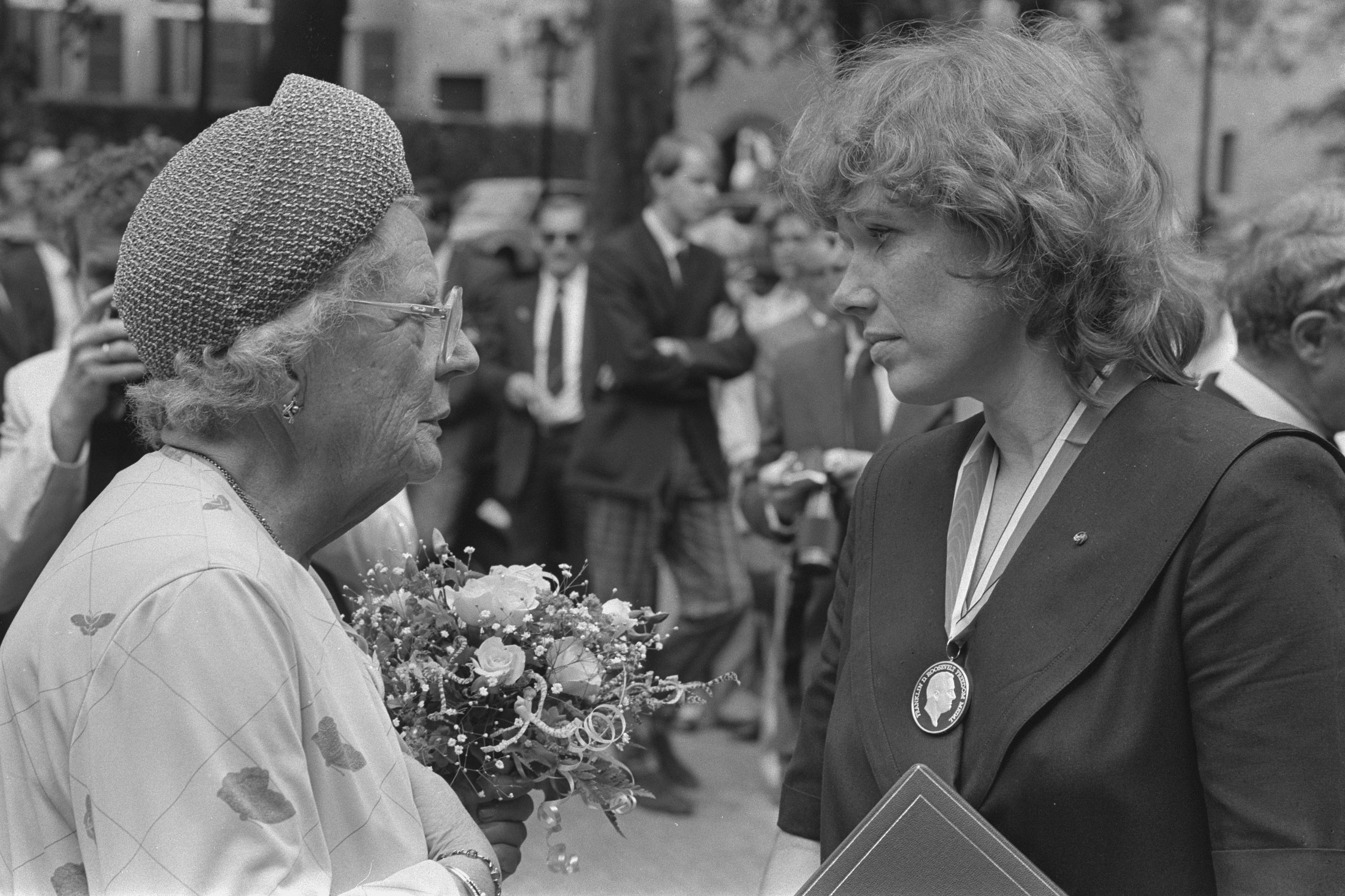
Former Queen Juliana of the Netherlands and Ullmann at the Four Freedoms Award ceremony in Middelburg on 23 June 1984

During 1984, she was chairperson of the jury at the 34th Berlin International Film Festival, and during 2001 chaired the jury of the 2001 Cannes Film Festival. She introduced her daughter, Linn Ullmann, to the audience with the words: "Here comes the woman whom Ingmar Bergman loves the most". Her daughter was there to receive the Prize of Honour on behalf of her father; she would return to serve the jury herself during 2011. She published two autobiographies, Changing (1977) and Choices (1984).

Ullmann's first film as a director was Sofie (1992); her friend and former co-actor, Josephson, starred on it. She later directed the Bergman-composed movie Faithless (2000). Faithless garnered nominations for both the Palme d'Or and Best Actress category at the 2000 Cannes Film Festival.

In 2003, Ullmann reprised her role from Scenes from a Marriage in Saraband (2003), Bergman's final telemovie. Her previous screen role had been in the Swedish movie Zorn (1994).

In 2004, Ullmann revealed that she had received an offer in November 2003 to play in three episodes of the American television series, Sex and the City. She was amused by the offer, and said that it was one of the few programs she regularly watched, but she turned it down. Later that year, Steven Soderbergh wrote a role in the movie Ocean's Twelve especially for her, but she also turned that down.

During 2006, Ullmann announced that she had been forced to end her longtime wish of making a film based on A Doll's House. According to her statement, the Norwegian Film Fund was preventing writer Ketil Bjørnstad and her from pursuing the project. Australian actress Cate Blanchett and British actress Kate Winslet had been intended to have been cast in the main roles of the movie. She later directed Blanchett in the play A Streetcar Named Desire, by Tennessee Williams, at the Sydney Theatre Company in Sydney, which was performed September through October 2009, and then continued from 29 October to 21 November 2009 at the Kennedy Center in Washington, DC, where it won a Helen Hayes Award for Outstanding Non-resident Production, as well as actress and supporting performer for 2009. The play was also performed at the Brooklyn Academy of Music in Brooklyn, New York. Ullmann narrated the Canada–Norway co-produced animated short movie The Danish Poet (2006), which won the Academy Award for Best Animated Short Film at the 79th Academy Awards during 2007.

In 2008, she was the head of the jury at the 30th Moscow International Film Festival. During 2012, she attended the International Indian Film Academy Awards in Singapore, where she was honored for her Outstanding Contributions to International Cinema and she also showed her movie on her relationship with Bergman. In 2013, Ullmann directed a film adaptation of Miss Julie. The film, released in September 2014, stars Jessica Chastain, Colin Farrell, and Samantha Morton. It was widely praised by the Norwegian press. In 2018, Ullmann narrated Wars Don't End, a documentary about the Lebensborn war children.

In March 2022, the Academy of Motion Picture Arts and Sciences announced that Ullmann would receive the Academy Honorary Award. John Lithgow presented her with the statue at the Governors Awards, saying, "For those few who claim that she never would've been called one of our greatest actors without Ingmar Bergman, I would answer, Bergman would probably never been called one of our greatest filmmakers without Liv Ullmann".

== Honours and causes ==
Ullmann is a UNICEF Goodwill Ambassador, and has traveled widely for the organization. She is also co-founder and honorary chair of the Women's Refugee Commission.

In 2005, King Harald V of Norway made Ullmann a Commander with Star of the Order of St. Olav.

Ullmann received an honorary degree, a doctorate of philosophy, from the Norwegian University of Science and Technology (NTNU) in 2006.

== Personal life ==
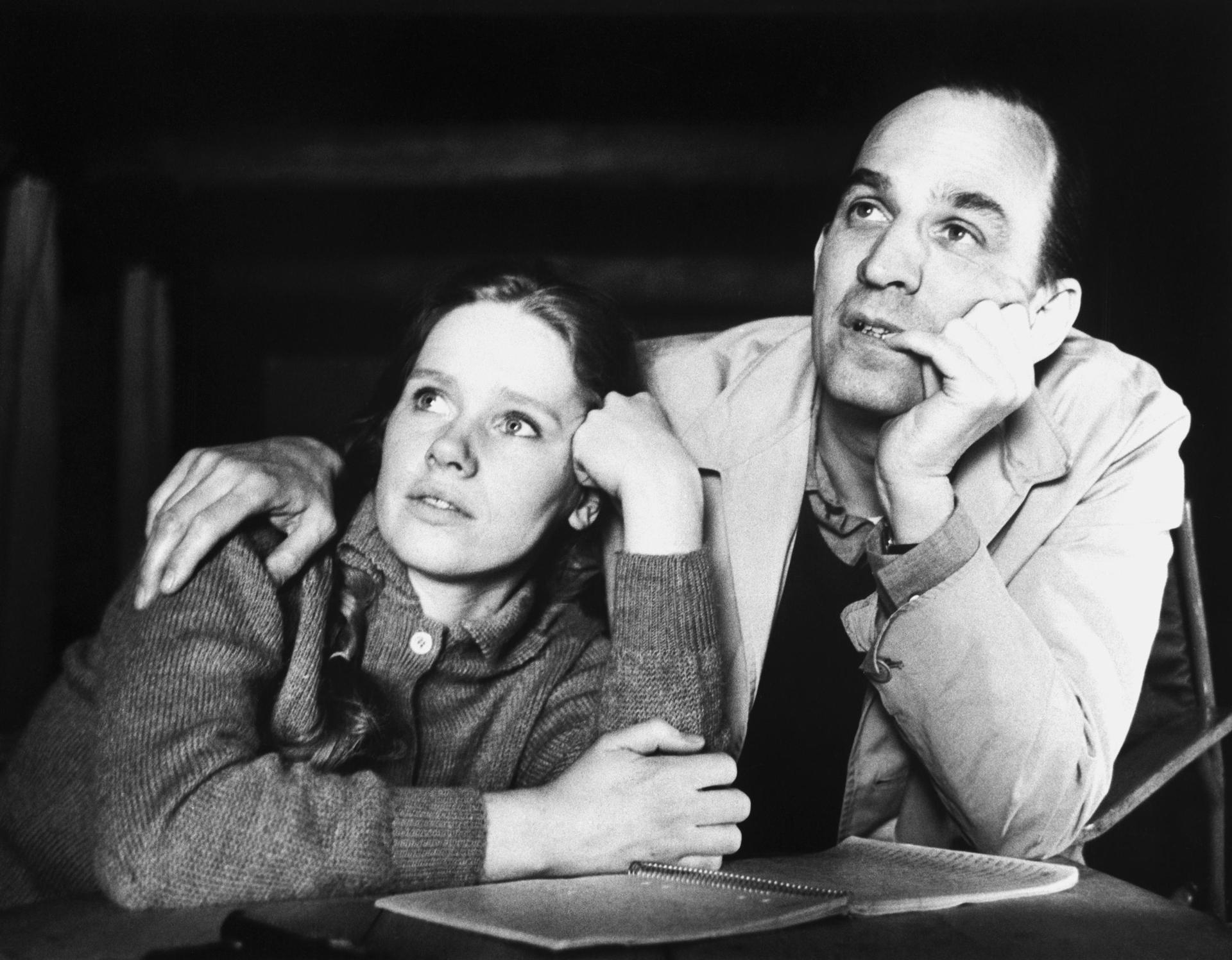
Ullmann with Ingmar Bergman in 1968

Ullmann was married to Norwegian psychiatrist Hans Jakob Stang from 1960 until they divorced in 1965. She was with Swedish filmmaker Ingmar Bergman from 1965 to 1970, becoming his muse and frequent collaborator. They had a daughter, writer Linn Ullmann (born 1966), whose son Halfdan Ullmann Tøndel (born 1990) became a filmmaker.

In 1985, Ullman married American real estate developer Donald Richard Saunders from Boston, and they divorced in 1995 but remained in a relationship.

== Performances and works ==
=== Film ===
As actress

Year	Title	Role	Director	Notes
1957	Fjols til fjells	Hotel Guest	Edith Carlmar	Uncredited extra
1959	The Wayward Girl	Gerd	Edith Carlmar	
1962	Tonny	Kari	Nils R. Müller; Per Gjersøe	
1962	Kort är sommaren			
1965	De kalte ham Skarven		Wilfred Breistrand; Erik Folke Gustavson	
1966	Persona	Elisabet Vogler	Ingmar Bergman	
1968	Hour of the Wolf	Alma Borg	Ingmar Bergman	
1968	Shame	Eva Rosenberg	Ingmar Bergman	
1969	An-Magritt	An-Magritt	Arne Skouen	
1969	The Passion of Anna	Anna Fromm	Ingmar Bergman	
1970	Cold Sweat	Fabienne Martin	Terence Young	
1971	The Emigrants	Kristina Nilsson	Jan Troell	
1971	The Night Visitor	Ester Jenks	László Benedek	
1972	The New Land	Kristina Nilsson	Jan Troell	
1972	Cries and Whispers	Maria (and her mother)	Ingmar Bergman	
1972	Pope Joan	Pope Joan	Michael Anderson	
1973	Scenes from a Marriage	Marianne	Ingmar Bergman	
1973	40 Carats	Ann Stanley	Milton Katselas	
1973	Lost Horizon	Catherine	Charles Jarrott	
1974	Zandy's Bride	Hannah Lund	Jan Troell	
1974	The Abdication	Queen Christina	Anthony Harvey	
1975	Léonor	Léonor	Juan Luis Buñuel	
1976	Face to Face	Dr. Jenny Isaksson	Ingmar Bergman	
1977	The Serpent's Egg	Manuela Rosenberg	Ingmar Bergman	
1977	A Bridge Too Far	Kate ter Horst	Richard Attenborough	
1978	Autumn Sonata	Eva Andergast	Ingmar Bergman	
1979	Players	Tennis Spectator	Anthony Harvey	Uncredited cameo
1980	Richard's Things	Kate Morris	Anthony Harvey	
1984	The Wild Duck	Gina	Henri Safran	
1984	The Bay Boy	Jenny Campbell	Daniel Petrie	
1984	Dangerous Moves	Marina Fromm	Richard Dembo	
1986	Let's Hope It's a Girl	Elena Leonardi	Mario Monicelli	
1987	Gaby: A True Story	Sari Brimmer	Luis Mandoki	
1987	Farewell Moscow	Ida Nudel	Mauro Bolognini	
1988	The Girlfriend	María	Jeanine Meerapfel	
1989	The Rose Garden	Gabriele Schlüter-Freund	Fons Rademakers	
1990	Mindwalk	Sonia Hoffman	Bernt Capra	
1991	Sadako and the Thousand Paper Cranes	Narrator	George Levenson	Voice; short film
1992	The Long Shadow	Katherine	Vilmos Zsigmond	
1992	The Ox	Mrs. Gustafsson	Sven Nykvist	
1994	Dreamplay	Ticket Seller	Unni Straume	
2003	Saraband	Marianne	Ingmar Bergman	
2006	The Danish Poet	Narrator	Torill Kove	Voice; short film
2008	Through a Glass, Darkly	Grandmother	Jesper W. Nielsen	
2009	Sinna mann	Mother	Anita Killi	Voice; English version
2012	Two Lives	Åse Evensen	Georg Mass; Judith Kaufmann	
2012	Liv & Ingmar	Herself	Dheeraj Akolkar	Documentary
2018	Wars Don't End	Narrator	Dheeraj Akolkar	Voice; documentary

As director

Year	Film	Distribution
1992	Sofie	Pathé
1995	Kristin Lavransdatter	HVE Entertainment
1996	Private Confessions	Sveriges Television
2000	Faithless	AB Svensk Filmindustri
2014	Miss Julie	Columbia TriStar

=== Television ===
Year	Title	Role
1963	Onkel Vanja	
1965	Smeltedigelen	Mary Warren
1966	En hyggelig fyr	Mabel
1966	Måken	Sonja
1967	Cocktailselskapet	Celia
1973	Scenes from a Marriage	Marianne
1975	Trollflöjten	Woman in Audience
1976	Face to Face	Dr. Jenny Isaksson
1979	The Lady from the Sea	Ellida Wangel
1983	Jenny	Jenny Winge
1983	Jacobo Timerman: Prisoner Without a Name, Cell Without a Number	Mrs. Jacobo Timerman
1988	Gli indifferenti	Maria Grazia
1994	Zorn	Emma Zorn
2003	Saraband	Marianne
2011	Long Day's Journey into Night	Mary Tyrone

=== Theatre ===
Year	Title	Role	Venue
1975	A Doll's House	Nora Helmer	Vivian Beaumont Theater, Broadway
1977	Anna Christie	Anna Christopherson	Imperial Theatre, Broadway
1979	I Remember Mama	Mama	Majestic Theatre, Broadway
1982	Ghosts	Mrs. Helen Alving	Brooks Atkinson Theatre, Broadway
2009	A Streetcar Named Desire	Director	Sydney Theatre Company; Kennedy Center
2019	Liv	Herself	
2021	American Moth		Grieg Hall

== Awards and recognition ==
Year	Award	Category	Project	Result	Ref
1968	National Society of Film Critics Award	Best Actress	Hour of the Wolf	Won	
1968	Guldbagge Award	Best Actress in a Leading Role	Hour of the Wolf	Won	
1968	National Board of Review Award	Best Actress	Shame	Won	
1971	Academy Awards	Best Actress	The Emigrants	Nominated	
1971	Golden Globe Awards	Best Actress in a Motion Picture – Drama	The Emigrants	Won	
1972	National Board of Review Award	Best Actress	The New Land	Won	
1972	New York Film Critics Circle Award	Best Actress	Cries and Whispers	Won	
1973	British Academy of Film and Television Arts	Best Actress in a Leading Role	Scenes from a Marriage	Nominated	
1973	Golden Globe Awards	Best Actress in a Motion Picture – Drama	Scenes from a Marriage	Nominated	
1973	National Society of Film Critics Award	Best Actress	Scenes from a Marriage	Won	
1973	New York Film Critics Circle Award	Best Actress	Scenes from a Marriage	Won	
1973	David di Donatello Awards	Best Foreign Actress	Scenes from a Marriage	Won	
1973	Golden Globe Awards	Best Actress – Motion Picture Comedy or Musical	40 Carats	Nominated	
1974	David di Donatello Awards	David Special Award		Won	
1975	Tony Awards	Best Actress in a Play	A Doll's House	Nominated	
1976	Academy Awards	Best Actress	Face to Face	Nominated	
1976	British Academy of Film and Television Arts	Best Actress in a Leading Role	Face to Face	Nominated	
1976	Golden Globe Awards	Best Actress in a Motion Picture – Drama	Face to Face	Nominated	
1976	National Board of Review Award	Best Actress	Face to Face	Won	
1976	New York Film Critics Circle Award	Best Actress	Face to Face	Won	
1976	Los Angeles Film Critics Association Award	Best Actress	Face to Face	Won	
1977	Tony Awards	Best Actress in a Play	Anna Christie	Nominated	
1978	David di Donatello Awards	Best Foreign Actress	Autumn Sonata	Won	
1986	David di Donatello Awards	Best Actress	Let's Hope It's a Girl	Nominated	
1987	David di Donatello Awards	Best Actress	Farewell Moscow	Nominated	
1988	San Sebastián International Film Festival	Best Actress	The Girlfriend	Won	
1989	Golden Globe Awards	Best Actress in a Motion Picture – Drama	The Rose Garden	Nominated	
1992	Montreal World Film Festival	Special Grand Prize of the Jury	Sofie	Won	
1996	Chicago International Film Festival	Gold Hugo	Private Confessions	Nominated	
2000	Cannes Film Festival	Palme d'Or	Faithless	Nominated	
2000	Chicago Film Critics Association Award for Best Director	Best Director	Faithless	Nominated	
2000	Goya Award	Best European Film	Faithless	Nominated	
2021	Academy Awards	Academy Honorary Award		Won	

Honors

- 1984: Four Freedoms Laureate, Freedom from Want
- 2006: Ibsen Centennial Commemoration Award
- 2006: The Danish Poet won its director Torill Kove the Academy Award for Best Animated Short Film at the 79th Academy Awards.
- 2010: 2010 FIAF Award
- 2012: International Indian Film Academy Awards for Outstanding Contribution to International Cinema

== See also ==
- List of Norwegian actors
- List of Norwegian writers
- List of film and television directors
- List of Norwegian speaking theatre directors in the 20th and 21st centuries
- List of Nordic Academy Award winners and nominees
- List of actors with Academy Award nominations
- List of actors with more than one Academy Award nomination in the acting categories
- List of Golden Globe winners

Awards
Preceded by Arve Tellefsen	Recipient of the Arts Council Norway Honorary Award; 1997	Succeeded by Sverre Fehn
