= Paula Weinstein =

American film and television producer (1945–2024)

- Born: November 19, 1945; New York City, U.S.
- Died: March 25, 2024 (aged 78); New York City, U.S.
- Occupations: Film and television producer
- Years active: 1985–2024
- Spouse: Mark Rosenberg (m. 1984; died 1992)
- Mother: Hannah Weinstein

Paula Weinstein (November 19, 1945 – March 25, 2024) was an American film and television producer.

== Biography ==
Weinstein was raised in a Jewish family, the daughter of television producer Hannah Weinstein (née Dorner) and Pete Weinstein, a reporter for The Brooklyn Eagle; her parents divorced in 1955. She was married to producer Mark Rosenberg until his death in 1992, at the age of 44. She often worked with Steve Kloves, Lasse Hallström, and Barry Levinson.

In 2013, Weinstein was named the Executive Vice President of Tribeca Enterprises.

Weinstein died at her home in New York on March 25, 2024, at the age of 78.

== Filmography ==
Weinstein was a producer on all films unless otherwise noted.

=== Film ===
Year	Film	Credit
1985	American Flyers	
1989	A Dry White Season	
1989	The Fabulous Baker Boys	
1993	Fearless	
1993	The House of the Spirits	Executive producer
1993	Flesh and Bone	
1994	With Honors	
1995	Something to Talk About	
1999	Analyze This	
1999	Liberty Heights	
2000	The Perfect Storm	
2000	An Everlasting Piece	
2001	Bandits	
2002	Possession	
2002	Analyze That	
2003	Deliver Us from Eva	
2003	Looney Tunes: Back in Action	
2004	Envy	
2005	Monster-in-Law	
2005	Rumor Has It	
2006	The Astronaut Farmer	
2006	Blood Diamond	
2010	The Company Men	
2010	How Do You Know	
2014	This Is Where I Leave You	
2015	In the Heart of the Sea	
TBA	1906	

Thanks

Year	Film	Role
2000	Waking the Dead	Thanks

=== Television ===
Year	Title	Credit	Notes
1990	The Rose and the Jackal	Executive producer	Television film
1991	Bejewelled	Executive producer	Television film
1992	Citizen Cohn	Executive producer	Television film
1994	Because Mommy Works	Executive producer	Television film
1995	Truman	Executive producer	Television film
1996	The Cherokee Kid	Executive producer	Television film
1997	First Time Felon	Executive producer	Television film
1997	Cloned	Executive producer	Television film
1998	Giving Up the Ghost	Executive producer	Television film
1999	If You Believe	Executive producer	Television film
2002	Crossed Over	Executive producer	Television film
2002	Salem Witch Trials	Co-executive producer	Television film
2004	Iron Jawed Angels	Executive producer	Television film
2008	Recount	Executive producer	Television film
2011	Too Big to Fail	Executive producer	Television film
2014	The Red Tent	Executive producer	
2015−2021	Grace and Frankie	Executive producer	
