= Susie Diamond =

Fictional character in the film The Fabulous Baker Boys

- The Fabulous Baker Boys character
- Susie Diamond, as portrayed by Michelle Pfeiffer, singing one of the songs from The Fabulous Baker Boys
- First appearance: The Fabulous Baker Boys (1989)
- Created by: Steve Kloves
- Portrayed by: Michelle Pfeiffer

In-universe information
- Occupation: Lounge singer Escort (former)
- Significant other: Jack Baker
- Nationality: American

Susie Diamond is a fictional character who appears in the romantic musical comedy-drama film The Fabulous Baker Boys (1989). Portrayed by Michelle Pfeiffer, Susie is a former escort who becomes a professional lounge singer when she is hired to help revitalize the career of The Fabulous Baker Boys, a waning piano duo consisting of brothers Jack and Frank Baker. Susie's addition to the group benefits both the trio's career and her own, but she also inadvertently generates conflict between the two brothers as Frank strongly disapproves of Jack's romantic interest in Susie, ultimately jeopardizing both the brothers' relationship with each other and the trio's future as a musical act.

Susie was created for the film by director and screenwriter Steve Kloves. Although Kloves was interested in casting Pfeiffer in the role from the beginning, Pfeiffer was much more hesitant to commit, citing exhaustion after having just recently completed several films at the time until Kloves ultimately convinced her to accept. Jodie Foster and Madonna were also considered for the role, among other candidates. Having not sung on-screen since her first leading role in the musical film Grease 2 (1982), Pfeiffer initially experienced reservations about providing her character's vocals herself but ultimately underwent several months of vocal coaching in preparation for the film's musical numbers. Furthermore, Pfeiffer researched professional lounge singers in addition to drawing inspiration from the performances of renowned jazz singers Sarah Vaughan, Billie Holiday and Ella Fitzgerald.

A pivotal role in the actress' career, Pfeiffer's performance garnered widespread acclaim from film critics, who were impressed with both her acting and singing abilities, and frequently dubbed her the film's highlight. Often commenting upon her strong sex appeal, comparisons were drawn between Pfeiffer and several classic Hollywood actresses, namely Marilyn Monroe, Lauren Bacall and Rita Hayworth. Pfeiffer won the Golden Globe Award for Best Actress in a Motion Picture – Drama. The actress was also nominated for an Academy Award for Best Actress but lost to Jessica Tandy's performance in Driving Miss Daisy (1989), a controversial outcome at the time that disappointed several critics. Additionally, Pfeiffer was recognized with "best actress" accolades from nearly all prestigious American film award organizations between 1989 and 1990.

Susie remains Pfeiffer's most critically acclaimed performance to-date, responsible for establishing her as both a bankable film actress and sex symbol. The scene in which Susie seductively performs the jazz standard "Makin' Whoopee", for which The Fabulous Baker Boys continues to be best-remembered, is considered to be an iconic staple of modern-day cinema, while earning a reputation as one of the sexiest scenes in film history.

== Role ==
The Fabulous Baker Boys conveys how Susie's induction into the eponymous musical duo affects the dynamic of both the act and the brothers' relationship with each other. As The Fabulous Baker Boys' business manager, Frank Baker decides that they should hire a female singer to help revive their struggling 15 year-old piano duo consisting of himself and his younger brother, Jack. 37 aspiring singers audition to be the group's third member, none of whom are promising candidates until Susie, a call girl previously employed by the Triple A Dating Service, arrives. Despite being an hour and a half late – by which time the brothers are frustrated – and dressed unprofessionally, Susie impresses them with her performance of "More Than You Know"; Jack in particular, being more forgiving of the character's unprofessionalism than Frank, believes that the combination of Susie's voice and attractiveness could help bolster their career. Susie is also much less accommodating than the other candidates Frank and Jack interview.

While Susie's addition helps The Fabulous Baker Boys experience success, it also results in complications among the group by disturbing some of the original act's traditions and threatening to come between the two brothers when Jack begins to fall in love with her. Susie and Jack's growing mutual attraction towards each other eventually threatens the stability of the trio. Having a family of his own, Frank is particularly concerned that if his younger brother Jack pursues Susie he will ultimately disregard her and cause her to leave the group, while Susie insists that she deserves a say in determining what songs the trio will perform, particularly lamenting that she is forced to sing "Feelings" at every scheduled performance. When Frank is pulled away from work for a family emergency around New Year's Eve, Susie and Jack seize the opportunity to make adjustments to their set list and ultimately make love in a late night jazz club after performing alone together. Frank is furious to learn that Susie and Jack have changed the set list without his permission and an argument ensues between Jack and Frank. Susie eventually leaves both the group and Jack due to Jack's refusal to express his true feelings for her, accepting a job singing jingles for television commercials. After mending his relationship with Frank, Susie receives a visit from Jack who apologizes for his behavior towards her; Susie does not clarify if she and Jack will rekindle their romance before walking away.

== Development and casting ==
Director and screenwriter Steve Kloves spent six months writing The Fabulous Baker Boys from the perspectives of its three main characters, exploring their complicated relationships with each other. Susie is portrayed by American actress Michelle Pfeiffer, who was first offered the role five years before production, only to decline it several times. Having already known her personally, Pfeiffer was the first actor Kloves expressed interest in casting in The Fabulous Baker Boys, but eventually prioritized casting real-life brothers Jeff and Beau Bridges as the eponymous Baker Boys when securing Pfeiffer proved challenging. However, Kloves' script struggled without an actress playing Susie. During this time, actress Debra Winger and singer Madonna were both considered for the role, the latter of whom declined because she found the script "mushy". Actresses Jodie Foster and Jennifer Jason Leigh had also expressed interest, but Kloves was eventually able to convince Pfeiffer, and maintains that she is the only actress he had ever seriously considered for the role. Although the actress enjoyed and felt connected to the character, she was hesitant to commit to another role so soon after having just having recently completed several high-profile film projects, initially intending to go on an acting hiatus after Dangerous Liaisons (1988). Thus, Kloves spent one week visiting Pfeiffer at her home until she relented. Prior to The Fabulous Baker Boys, most of Pfeiffer's roles had been rather unglamorous; Pfeiffer claims that she typically avoided playing glamorous characters because she found most of them uninteresting until she discovered Susie. Pfeiffer accepted the role because she "thought [Susie] was a great woman ... someone I really wanted to be like".

Pfeiffer performed all of her character's vocals for both the film and its soundtrack. Because she does not consider herself a professional singer, Pfeiffer's reservations about singing on camera contributed to her early hesitance to accept the role, having not done so since Grease 2 (1982). Kloves maintains that he did not hire Pfeiffer based on her singing, but rather because of how she uses acting to interpret lyrics. Despite Kloves' insistence that Pfeiffer's singing not be dubbed, composer Dave Grusin was skeptical until Pfeiffer's rendition of "My Funny Valentine" convinced him. For several months, the actress took extensive singing lessons from voice coach Sally Stevens to prepare for the role. In addition to performing vocal exercises to strengthen her vocal chords, Pfeiffer would often work 10-hour days in the recording studio before returning home to listen to and study her own recordings. Already impressed with Pfeiffer's rhythm and phrasing, Stevens trained her to avoid pronouncing words that would sound too contemporary for the film's jazz standards by using her teeth and smiling to "lift" her pitch. Admitting that the film's songs were much more challenging than what she had performed in Grease 2, Pfeiffer worked especially hard on improving her phrasing because the material for The Fabulous Baker Boys were different than the pop music she had grown more accustomed to singing. Additionally, she drew inspiration from real-life lounge singers performing at The Hollywood Roosevelt Hotel in Los Angeles, while listening to jazz singers Sarah Vaughan, Dinah Washington, Rickie Lee Jones, Billie Holiday and Helen Merrill for inspiration, without directly copying them. Pfeiffer incorporated the "undercurrent of anger" in the lounge singer's performances, drawn from the fact that "a lot of club singers ... haven't had the recognition they feel they deserve or that they had hoped for" into her own interpretation of Susie. Stevens encouraged Pfeiffer to envision herself as Ingrid Bergman's character Ilsa Lund in the film Casablanca (1942) while recording "More Than You Know" for the film's soundtrack, which the actress identified as one of her favorite songs. Stevens also suggested that Pfeiffer research jazz singer Ella Fitzgerald because Fitzgerald possesses "a quality artists of that period had that we felt the character Susie might have listened to", describing the end result as "an airy alto, a nice breathy quality, and intelligence in delivery". Despite her extensive training, the vocal coach felt it was important that Susie's voice sound "pleasant" but still untrained.

Pfeiffer likened preparing for the role to a musician recording an album, describing the process as twice as much work. At one point, she confessed to Kloves that she felt she was performing terribly; Kloves insisted that Pfeiffer is a poignant and insightful perfectionist. Producer Mark Rosenberg appreciated Pfeiffer for portraying Susie as a character who is "so colorful and full of life that even Jack ... has to perk up and pay attention". Although Pfeiffer was ultimately pleased with her singing, she sometimes doubted her own abilities while filming in fear that she might have "outdone" herself. Pfeiffer slightly slurred her speech to portray her character. A scene originally intended for the film in which Pfeiffer's character accidentally allows a bath she has begun pouring herself to overflow because she has become distracted thinking about Jack was ultimately edited out of the final film. Pfeiffer initially had reservations about performing atop a grand piano, fearing that it would appear "silly" and cause audience members to laugh. However, Kloves encouraged her to commit to the scene. Pfeiffer's short evening dress worn during the musical sequence was designed to be revealing enough without exposing Pfeiffer while she moves, which was choreographed by dancer Peggy Holmes. Pfeiffer touted her character "one of the most alive characters that I've played", describing her as an "emotional creature" who is "not afraid to take risks ... doesn't lie to herself. If she makes a mistake, she doesn't blame anybody else. There's a purity in her honesty that I really respect", becoming a strong role model for the actress herself. According to the Orlando Sentinel's Kathy Huffhines, Susie "has a harder shell, a sharper edge, and a franker sexiness" than previous characters Pfeiffer has played. According to film critic David Thomson of The Independent, the role of Susie allowed Pfeiffer to add an aspect to her filmography, prior to which had been "dutiful" yet "routine".

== Characterization and themes ==
According to film critic Roger Ebert, Susie adheres to the Hollywood tradition of being depicted as a hooker with a heart of gold, while her tough demeanor is little more than an act. Matt Brunson of Creative Loafing described Susie as a "tough-talking, street-smart" character who is "always ready with a quip (or a sharp counter to a quip)". Writing for The Daily Beast, Elizabeth Kaye identified Susie as "a woman who must battle to keep her emotions from showing". Film Quarterly's Steve Vineberg wrote that the character boasts "a cannily concealed underlayer of childlike dreaminess," comparing her appearance and wardrobe to that of singer Ricky Lee Jones. Wounded by life, Susie wears an "armor" that is both impenetrable yet makes others want to experience more of the character. Kaye felt that the role was especially poignant for Pfeiffer, who in real life had still been recovering from an affair with actor John Malkovich at the same time she was filming The Fabulous Baker Boys. According to Cinapse's Frank Cavillo, Pfeiffer "had never been as open or vulnerable on screen until starring in The Fabulous Baker Boys." Film critic Mike D'Angelo, writing for The Dissolve, believes that Pfeiffer decided to accept the role of Susie because she was still embarrassed by her performance in the unsuccessful musical Grease 2 (1982), and wanted to prove that she was in fact capable of playing a character who was a combination of both Sandy Olsson and Betty Rizzo from Grease (1978) at the same time.

Film critic Mike D'Angelo observed that "the character's name is Susie Diamond, and she's written like a woman named Susie Diamond, and Pfeiffer plays her ... like a woman named Susie Diamond." As a romantic film, The Fabulous Baker Boys focuses on "the unfulfilled longing between" bandmates Susie and Jack. Susie is the only woman capable of changing "the aloof, uncommunicative Jack ... by throwing incendiary tantrums and sounding even tougher than he does", slowly inspiring the pianist to change the person he has allowed himself to become. Rolling Stone's Peter Travers believes that Susie and Jack bond because both characters are "losers who've sold themselves on the cheap"; Jack is a skilled musician who despises himself for squandering his talent, which reminds former escort Susie of herself. Pfeiffer agreed that her character essentially becomes "a mirror image for Jack" although both remain very different individuals. While Jack is depicted as timid and cautious about his decisions, Susie rather "embraces life" instead. An adventurous individual, Susie refuses to do only one thing, including perform, for her entire life. Pfeiffer observed that although her character has spent a significant portion of her life as an escort, she remains less of a "whore" than Jack because she retains her individuality, while Jack "has ceased to be a vital human being". When Susie and Jack have their final argument, the profanity Jack uses actually helps establish Susie as the stronger character, according to Mark R. Hasan of KQEK.com. Susie's nicknames for her bandmates reveal exactly how she feels about both brothers individually; while she refers to Frank as "Egghead" because of his growing bald spot and tendency to act unintelligent at times, she calls Jack simply "Baker" because, in her opinion, "there's really only one Baker brother and he's it". The way Susie teases Frank is reminiscent of how Jack used to treat him several years before she joined the band when he had energy to do it.

Susie's ballads occupy roughly one-third of the film, performing a combination of both contemporary and classic standards. Rosenberg compared the character to actress Marilyn Monroe's character Sugar Kane Kowalczyk in the film Some Like it Hot (1959). Susie's lack of singing experience is balanced by an "ineffable vocal quality that causes people to listen, because they might be missing something." Steve Vineberg, writing in the journal Film Quarterly, agreed that, despite her unimpressive voice, Susie "wears a lyric tight to her skin, liked a zipped-up sleeping bag." According to Télérama's Guillemette Odicino, the character has been "endowed with a voice and a charm to take the breath." Susie remains a heavily guarded individual until she performs "Makin' Whoopee", which finally allows her to lower her defenses. When Susie performs the song, she is – for the first time – not singing to the audience, but to her sole accompanist Jack instead. According to Slant film critic Chuck Bowen, "When Susie sings 'Makin' Whoopee' in a traffic-stopping red dress, mounting Jack's piano as if it's an extension of his very essence ... all bets of detached, business-collaborative stability between the two are understood to be off." Bowen also compared the character's performance to actress Rita Hayworth's in the film Gilda (1946). Prior to this moment, it almost appears as though a romantic relationship might never actually develop between the two characters. Observing that the character's tough attitude matches the difficult life she has been through, Janet Maslin of The New York Times believes that Susie must be "singing from experience" when she performs the song "Ten Cents a Dance". Go Slow: The Life of Julie London author Michael Owen considers both Pfeiffer's performance and Susie herself to be a tribute to actress and singer Julie London, citing similarities such as asking her accompanist to perform "More Than You Know" in a slow tempo, swearing into a live microphone and delivering a "sexy rendition" of "Makin' Whoopee", capturing "some of the essence of Julie's style."

== Reception ==
=== Critical response ===
When The Fabulous Baker Boys was released in 1989, the idea of Pfeiffer playing a sex worker generated strong publicity. Pfeiffer's performance of "Makin' Whoopee" was used heavily to promote the film, garnering immense interest that rivaled most films released that same year. Pfeiffer continued to generate press even after the studio removed The Fabulous Baker Boys from most theaters due to financial concerns. In 1990, Empire nicknamed the actress "The Fabulous Pfeiffer Girl" in honor of her role.

Pfeiffer received unanimous acclaim for her performance. The New York Times film critic Janet Maslin said Pfeiffer "proves to be [an] electrifyingly right" but unexpected choice for the role, while Jay Boyar of the Orlando Sentinel said "Pfeiffer does as much for this movie as her Susie does for the Baker boys' act". Rolling Stone film critic Peter Travers insisted that the film would simply "evaporate" without Pfeiffer, concluding, "make no mistake: It's Michelle Pfeiffer who puts the 'fabulous' into Baker Boys". Steve Simels of Entertainment Weekly agreed that Pfeiffer "saves Baker Boys from cliché", explaining, "she almost makes her indifferently written bad-girl-with-a-heart-of-gold into something three-dimensional and believable". Vanity Fair's Katey Rich concurred: "The film is ostensibly about the Baker (and Bridges) boys, but Pfeiffer stole the show" by imbuing her character with soul and vulnerability. Contributing to The Morton Report, Chaz Lipp agreed that "Pfeiffer feels absolutely authentic in the role", appreciating the actress for interpreting Susie as more than a stock character. Despite complaining than the main cast "become less interesting" towards the end of the film, TV Guide agreed that Pfeiffer "deserves the most credit" for keeping the film entertaining. Both The Independent's David Thomson and the Chicago Reader film critic Jonathan Rosenbaum praised Pfeiffer's singing.

"What gives the film to Pfeiffer is her effortless re-creation of noir-ish fatalism - her only rival at husky chanteuse-ing is Ida Lupino in Road House. She acts as tough as enamel, yet she turns into flesh when Bridges gives her a back-rub. The hard-soft tension is daydream, but Pfeiffer has an assurance that allowed first-time director Kloves to get away with it. Baker Boys wasn't a hit, but anyone who loved ... babes who talked rough but sang sweet was hooked."

— The Independent's David Thomson, on Pfeiffer's performance.

Exclaim!'s Travis Mackenzie Hoover described Pfeiffer as "surprisingly nuanced ... in a role that might have been blown off by most other actresses". The Dissolve's Mike D'Angelo found Pfeiffer "remarkable" in how "she can make a lengthy, here's-my-psyche-in-a-nutshell monologue and sound natural and impromptu, while still coming across as delectably movie-star glamorous". DVD Talk's Neil Lumbard described Pfeiffer as "sensational" in a role that showcases both her dramatic and comedic talents, while Guillemette Odicino of Télérama said she proves she is as talented as she is beautiful. Some critics felt Pfeiffer's performance of "Makin' Whoopee" distracted them from reviewing the film's other merits. For the Arizona Daily Sun, Erin Shelley wrote that The Fabulous Baker Boys finally "soars" once Pfeiffer performs "Makin' Whoopee". Dubbing it "one of her finest performances", AllMovie critic Matthew Doberman described Pfeiffer's rendition of "Makin' Whoopee" as "enough to make the film worth seeing". While praising the entire cast and characters, Frank Calvillo of Cinapse declared Susie "the film's most indispensable character", calling Pfeiffer "luminous and poetic in every frame". However, Time Out said Susie fails to "escape stereotyping" despite Pfeiffer's commendable performance. Describing the role as Pfeiffer's "richest work", Matthew Jacobs of HuffPost wrote that she demonstrates "an accessibility that defies easy assumptions", commending her ability to win audiences over "without bulldozing her co-stars or positioning herself as some sort of diva to be reckoned with — a foundation that pays off later in the film when Susie reveals her working-class vulnerability."

Film critic Roger Ebert predicted that The Fabulous Baker Boys would become "one of the movies they will use as a document ... when they begin to trace the steps by which Pfeiffer became a great star", concluding, "This is the movie of her flowering - not just as a beautiful woman, but as an actress with the ability to make you care about her, to make you feel what she feels." Ebert also identified Pfeiffer as a successor to classic Hollywood actresses Rita Hayworth and Marilyn Monroe, while Rita Kempley of The Washington Post compared Pfeiffer to Lauren Bacall.

=== Awards and accolades ===
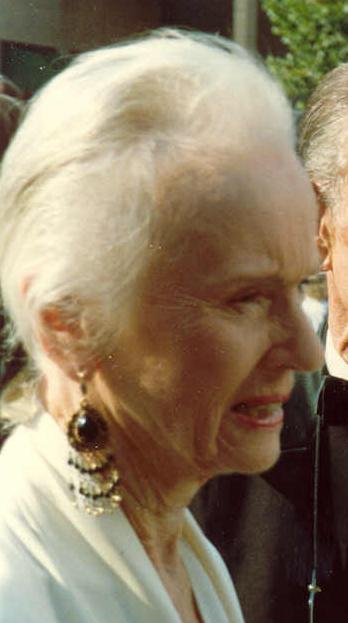
Despite being favored to win the Academy Award for Best Actress, Pfeiffer controversially lost to Jessica Tandy.

Pfeiffer won the Golden Globe Award for Best Actress in a Motion Picture – Drama, her first win and second nomination after having been nominated for Married to the Mob (1988) the previous year. Some critics felt she should have been nominated in the award's Comedy or Musical category considering her several musical performances throughout The Fabulous Baker Boys. Pfeiffer was nominated for the Academy Award for Best Actress, her second Academy Award nomination. According to film critic Emanuel Levy, Pfeiffer and fellow nominee Jessica Tandy were considered to be the category's frontrunners, with the media dubbing the competition between Pfeiffer and Tandy "Old Hollywood Vs. Young Hollywood" due to the age difference between Pfeiffer (31) and Tandy (80) at the time.

Despite being largely favored to win, Pfeiffer ultimately lost the award to Tandy, who won for her performance in Driving Miss Daisy (1989), a result that upset both surprised critics and the general public. Critics believe Tandy won because Academy Award voters felt sentimental towards her age, aided by the fact that her film had been nominated for an Academy Award for Best Picture while The Fabulous Baker Boys was not. Katey Rich of Vanity Fair insists that the award rightfully belonged to Pfeiffer, ranking the spectacle among "10 Times the Golden Globes Got It Right and the Oscars Didn't".

Pfeiffer became one of only seven actresses to win Best Actress awards from all four major United States film critics associations – the New York Film Critics Circle, the Los Angeles Film Critics Association, The National Board of Review and the National Society of Film Critics – for a single performance, as well as the only one of these seven actresses who did not go on to win the Academy Award for Best Actress for that same performance. According to Stylist, Pfeiffer won nearly every recognized "best actress" film award that season except for the Academy and British Academy Film Awards. Pfeiffer was also nominated for an American Comedy Award for Funniest Actress in a Motion Picture.

== Impact and legacy ==
Pfeiffer had already begun to make a name for herself as an actress by starring in the films Tequila Sunrise, Dangerous Liaisons and Married to the Mob in 1988, but her performance in The Fabulous Baker Boys the following year ultimately benefited her career the most by leaving the largest impression on the film industry, becoming one of her defining roles. One of the actress' earliest notable performances, Susie remains Pfeiffer's most critically acclaimed role to-date, having earned the most enthusiastic reviews of her career thus far. In 2007, Mal Vincent of The Virginian-Pilot called Susie "her greatest role", a sentiment shared by Into Film. According to the Arizona Daily Sun's Erin Shelley, Susie's reception finally "cemented Michelle Pfeiffer's reputation as a movie star." New Woman contributor Adam Platt wrote that, after the success of The Witches of Eastwick (1987) and Dangerous Liaisons, The Fabulous Baker Boys established the actress as "a Hollywood star". Harper's Bazaar's Carolyn Doyle Karasyov agreed that Susie "captivated the critics and solidified [Pfeiffer's] position as one of Hollywood's leading ladies." Stephen Rebello of Movieline believes that the Academy Award nomination Pfeiffer received for her performance finally "allowed her to pick the projects she desired" henceforth.

Ranking The Fabulous Baker Boys Pfeiffer's best film, Rotten Tomatoes contributor Jeff Giles wrote that the film "most importantly — highlight[s] the luminous beauty of Michelle Pfeiffer." Also ranking it Pfeiffer's greatest film, Robert Pius of Golderby wrote that the actress "made film history." In a ranking of Pfeiffer's five best film roles, Entertainment Weekly crowned Susie "the role of her career ... so far". Vulture recognized the performance among Pfeiffer's "10 Essential Roles", which author Angelica Jade Bastién described as "tough yet vulnerable, alluring yet never overwrought", while The Guardian's Adam Boult considers it one of the actress' "five best moments". GamesRadar+ ranked Pfeiffer's portrayal of Susie the 194th greatest film performance of all-time. Filmsite.org considers Susie to be one of the "Greatest Film Characters of All Time". Harper's Bazaar included Susie among Pfeiffer's seven most fashionable film characters, while the Tribeca Film Festival website ranked Susie eighth on the organization's countdown of Pfeiffer's "18 Roles Ranked in Order of Terrifying Beauty". In 2017, InStyle ranked Susie Pfeiffer's fourth "Most Breathtaking" role. In addition to helping establish her as one of her generation's most acclaimed actresses, Pfeiffer's performance also established her as one of the industry's most enduring sex symbols. According to Jane Graham of The Guardian, The Fabulous Baker Boys and Susie are responsible for making Pfeiffer "the biggest female film star in the world" at the time, simultaneously "catapult[ing] her to the top of every Most Desirable Female survey for most of the 90s." Similarly, Entertainment Weekly's Steve Simels wrote that Susie encouraged Pfeiffer's reputation as the "sexiest woman in the movies".

The scene in which Susie, dressed in a red evening dress, seductively performs "Makin' Whoopee" on top of a grand piano has since become iconic and often parodied. As the film's most famous and iconic scene, it quickly became "the stuff of legend" according to Creative Loafing's Matt Brunson. The Fabulous Baker Boys tends to be most remembered for this celebrated scene. The Guardian's Jane Graham agreed that the film's title "will immediately conjure up an image of a beautiful woman sliding her way across a grand piano", referring to Pfeiffer's performance as "undoubtedly ... the most memorable aspect" of The Fabulous Baker Boys, rivaling performances by Marilyn Monroe. Vulture's Angelica Jade Bastién wrote that Pfeiffer elevates the scene "to that small pantheon of definitive bombshell moments that strike with the force of a chemical reaction," comparing it to Rita Hayworth and Marilyn Monroe's performances in Gilda and Some Like It Hot, respectively. Additionally, Turner Classic Movies believes that "Makin' Whoopee" is largely responsible for Pfeiffer's Academy Award nomination. In 2000, Empire film critic Ian Nathan proclaimed that Pfeiffer's "immaculate" rendition of "Makin' Whoopee" had finally achieved "classic" status. Mike D'Angelo of The Dissolve likened the sequence's impact to those of other famous film performances and lines that "are embodied in the cultural consciousness", such as "You talkin' to me?" from Taxi Driver (1976) and "Get to the choppa!" from Predator (1987), concluding, "It's easy to forget ... that there was more to the movie—and to Pfeiffer's terrific work therein—than that one intensely erotic scene. While including The Fabulous Baker Boys among Pfeiffer's greatest film roles, Rachel West of Entertainment Tonight Canada wrote that the film's most famous scene "cements her status as a late 1980s blonde bombshell". InSing ranked the scene eighth on their "30 sexiest scenes in movie history" countdown. The Calgary Herald considers The Fabulous Baker Boys to be the ninth sexiest film of all-time largely due to "Makin' Whoopee". Nerve ranked Pfeiffer the 33rd "Greatest Female Sex Symbols in Film History", dubbing the actress' rendition of "Makin' Whoopee" "a play from a sex-symbol how-to guide." After providing her own vocals in The Fabulous Baker Boys, Pfeiffer would eventually go on to sing in two more musical films, The Prince of Egypt (1998) and Hairspray (2007), earning positive reviews on each occasion. In 2005, film critic Lisa Schwarzbaum named Pfeiffer's performance easily her best performance by a singing actor on film.
