= The Fabulous Baker Boys =

1989 film by Steve Kloves

- Theatrical release poster by John Alvin
- Directed by: Steve Kloves
- Written by: Steve Kloves
- Produced by: Paula Weinstein; Mark Rosenberg
- Starring: Jeff Bridges; Michelle Pfeiffer; Beau Bridges
- Cinematography: Michael Ballhaus
- Edited by: William Steinkamp
- Music by: Dave Grusin
- Production companies: Gladden Entertainment; Mirage Enterprises
- Distributed by: 20th Century Fox
- Release date: October 13, 1989
- Running time: 114 minutes
- Country: United States
- Language: English
- Budget: $11.5 million
- Box office: $18.4 million

The Fabulous Baker Boys is a 1989 American romantic comedy drama musical film written and directed by Steve Kloves. The film follows a piano act consisting of two brothers, who hire an attractive female singer to help revive their waning career. After a period of success, complications ensue when the younger brother develops romantic feelings for the singer. Brothers Jeff Bridges and Beau Bridges star as the eponymous Baker Boys, while Michelle Pfeiffer plays lounge singer Susie Diamond.

The Fabulous Baker Boys was Kloves's directorial debut and second screenplay. He conceived the story based on Ferrante & Teicher, a piano duo he had grown up watching perform on The Ed Sullivan Show, which inspired him to write a film about working class musicians who are also siblings. Determined to direct the film himself, Kloves sold the script to producers Paula Weinstein and Mark Rosenberg. It was subsequently rotated among several production companies before it was ultimately obtained by 20th Century Fox in 1986. Pfeiffer underwent several months of voice training to perform all of her character's songs, which largely consist of jazz and pop standards. While both Bridges brothers play their instruments on camera, their audio was dubbed by the film's composer, Dave Grusin, and musician John F. Hammond, respectively. Although primarily set in Seattle, Washington, the film was shot mostly in Los Angeles, California, from December 1988 to March 1989.

The Fabulous Baker Boys was released on October 13, 1989, to critical acclaim, but underperformed at the box office. The National Board of Review named it one of the year's 10 best films. Reviewers praised Pfeiffer's performance in particular, often selecting her rendition of "Makin' Whoopee" on top of a grand piano as a standout. The scene is considered to be one of the sexiest in film history, according to several media publications. The film was nominated for four Academy Awards at the 62nd Academy Awards: Best Actress (for Pfeiffer), Best Cinematography, Best Film Editing, and Best Original Score. Pfeiffer won nearly every acting award for which she was nominated during the 1989–1990 awards season, including the Golden Globe Award for Best Actress in a Motion Picture – Drama, but lost the Academy Award to Jessica Tandy.

== Plot ==
The Fabulous Baker Boys are a piano duo consisting of brothers Jack and Frank Baker. For 15 years, they have been performing show tunes in bars and lounges throughout Seattle, Washington on a pair of matching grand pianos. While Frank dutifully serves as the duo's manager, Jack has grown weary of the hackneyed material they have come to perform over the years, but his complacency leaves him uninspired to pursue his talents further. Apart from occasionally playing the music he enjoys at a local jazz club, Jack's personal life largely consists of meaningless one-night stands; caring for his aging Labrador, Eddie; and spending time with Nina, a lonely girl from his apartment building whose single mother neglects her in favor of romantic pursuits.

Concerned about a sudden decrease in stable gigs and loss of income, Frank decides to hire a female singer to revive interest in their act. After auditioning 37 unsuccessful candidates, they meet Susie Diamond, a former escort who demands an audition despite being over an hour late. Although initially at odds with Frank over her boldness and unprofessionalism, Susie impresses both brothers with her audition and they hire her. Their debut performance as a trio is flawed but ultimately well-received and the rebranded act gradually receives better gigs and higher salaries in return.

The now in-demand trio is booked for an extended engagement at a luxurious resort. Jack and Susie flirt with each other cautiously in-between gigs, but neither acts upon their feelings. Noticing a growing attraction between them, Frank forbids Jack from pursuing Susie in fear that a relationship between the two would compromise the group's stability and newfound success. Frank returns to Seattle prematurely when one of his children suffers a minor injury. Taking advantage of his absence to contemporize their setlist, Susie and Jack deliver a sultry performance of "Makin' Whoopee" during the hotel's New Year's Eve festivities, after which they finally succumb to their feelings and sleep together. Susie opens up to Jack about her past as an escort, but Jack remains emotionally distant.

When the couple returns to Seattle, Frank quickly deduces that Jack and Susie have slept with each other; tensions arise when both rebel against Frank's creative control and song choices. After spending another night with Jack, Susie tells him she has received a lucrative job offer to record television jingles for cat food, which would require her to leave the group. Jack is quietly heartbroken that Susie would even consider leaving but refuses to admit how he truly feels, instead acting as though her departure is of no concern to him. Susie accepts the job after a final performance with The Fabulous Baker Boys and they part ways following a heated argument in which Susie accuses Jack of being a coward in his pursuits of both her and his career.

Jack and Frank quarrel about the increasingly humiliating gigs Frank has been booking them due to Susie's departure, which Frank blames Jack for. After nearly breaking Frank's hand during a physical altercation, Jack quits the band. He takes his frustrations out on Nina upon returning home but apologizes soon afterward, learning she will rely on him less once her mother marries her newest boyfriend. Now prepared to venture out on his own, Jack visits Frank to make amends. Having opted to offer piano lessons from his home, Frank accepts Jack's decision to pursue a solo career and explains he thought he was helping his younger brother live a carefree life, of which he was sometimes jealous. They reminisce about the early days of their act with a final duet.

Jack visits Susie, who is not particularly enjoying her new job and he expresses regret about his behavior towards her. Susie is not quite ready to resume their relationship but the two part as friends, with Jack telling her he has a feeling they will see each other again. Jack watches as Susie walks off to her new job until she is nearly out of sight.

== Cast ==
- Jeff Bridges as Jack Baker, Frank's younger brother
- Michelle Pfeiffer as Susie Diamond
- Beau Bridges as Frank Baker, Jack's older brother
- Jennifer Tilly as Blanche "Monica" Moran
- Ellie Raab as Nina
- Xander Berkeley as Lloyd
- Dakin Matthews as Charlie
- Ken Lerner as Ray
- Albert Hall as Henry
- Terri Treas as Girl in Bed
- Gregory Itzin as Vince Nancy
- Bradford English as Earl
- David Coburn as Kid at Vet

== Production ==
=== Writing and development ===
Screenwriter Steve Kloves was inspired to write The Fabulous Baker Boys based on Ferrante & Teicher, a piano duo he had grown up watching perform on The Ed Sullivan Show during the 1960s. He found himself fascinated by "blue-collar entertainment – people who work in the arts in a kind of working class way." Remembering that during his childhood, parents typically enrolled their children in piano lessons simply to 'give them culture', he decided to write a story about piano-playing brothers, citing familial dysfunction as a common theme among his work. Although he felt a story about a waning piano act would provide strong material for a feature-length film, some of Kloves's peers warned him "it was a completely bizarre, terrible idea for a movie", expressing concerns that its dark subject matter and frequent arguments would not translate well on screen. Kloves conducted little research while writing the script, instead opting to complete the first draft based on what he learned from spending time in hotels. Kloves recalled that he would sometimes visit hotel bars "and hear some guy play the piano ... and some of them were pretty good. The way my mind tripped off on it was that this guy's parents gave him piano lessons to improve his life and give him an opening into culture and there he was, 20 years later, at a Holiday Inn playing 'Feelings'." Since Kloves typically writes his films around its characters, he spent six months writing notes about the main characters' relationships with each other before finalizing the story. He also used index cards to indicate specific scenes and moments which he organized on a board, but found this approach was not always successful.

A first draft of the screenplay was completed as early as April 1985, in which Kloves describes the titular characters as "a poor man's version of Ferrante and Teicher." The Fabulous Baker Boys was Kloves's directorial debut. The experience he gained writing his previous film, Racing with the Moon (1984), motivated him to direct The Fabulous Baker Boys himself because the final version of the former "wasn't what I saw in my head". Although Kloves had always aspired to direct the film himself, he considered his prospects unlikely due to his young age (he was 25 years-old when he first started optioning the script to filmmakers) and lack of experience, having only written one film prior. Fearing a different director would struggle to fulfill his vision, his determination ultimately delayed the project by several years. Kloves decided to keep the script to himself until he could secure funding that would also allow him to direct his own project. He finally sold The Fabulous Baker Boys as a spec script to then-Warner Bros. worldwide production president Mark Rosenberg, after originally selling it to producers Paula Weinstein and Gareth Wigan of WW Productions. Weinstein and Wigan eventually negotiated a deal to share the film rights with Rosenberg.

Kloves attempted to work on the film with director George Roy Hill, but they experienced creative differences. Following the dissolution of WW Productions, Weinstein became an executive consultant at Metro-Goldwyn-Mayer (MGM) under Alan Ladd Jr., while Rosenberg eventually left Warner Bros to found Mirage Productions with filmmaker Sydney Pollack. Partnering with Mirage, Weinstein briefly relocated The Fabulous Baker Boys to MGM, only for the film to move once again to 20th Century Fox following Ladd Jr's departure from MGM. Kloves attributes his struggles with getting the film made to Warner Bros' reluctance to release the film's rights to a different studio "and watch it be a success for someone else", despite their disinterest in producing the film themselves. Pollack was retained as an executive producer. Kloves credits Rosenberg, Pollack and Weinstein with helping him earn approval to direct the film, having been fans of his previous work. The film's development began in 1986, and was completed over the course of four years, the length of which The New York Times journalist Bernard Weinraub attributed to the film's melancholy nature and Kloves's insistence on directing. Kloves's final draft of his screenplay is dated November 4, 1988.

=== Casting ===
When casting The Fabulous Baker Boys began, Kloves recalled that while studio executives often dismissed his script as "dreary and depressing", most actors considered for the film found it "funny and moving". Wallis Nicita was the film's casting director. Bill Murray briefly expressed interest in starring while the film was in early development. The studio had also considered casting Murray's Saturday Night Live castmate, comedian Chevy Chase, as either Jack or Frank Baker, despite both actors having little musical experience. Brothers Dennis and Randy Quaid were offered the titular roles but turned them down. Although both Jeff and Pfeiffer were Kloves's first choices for their respective roles, he was initially reluctant to cast Beau, despite Jeff's suggestion.

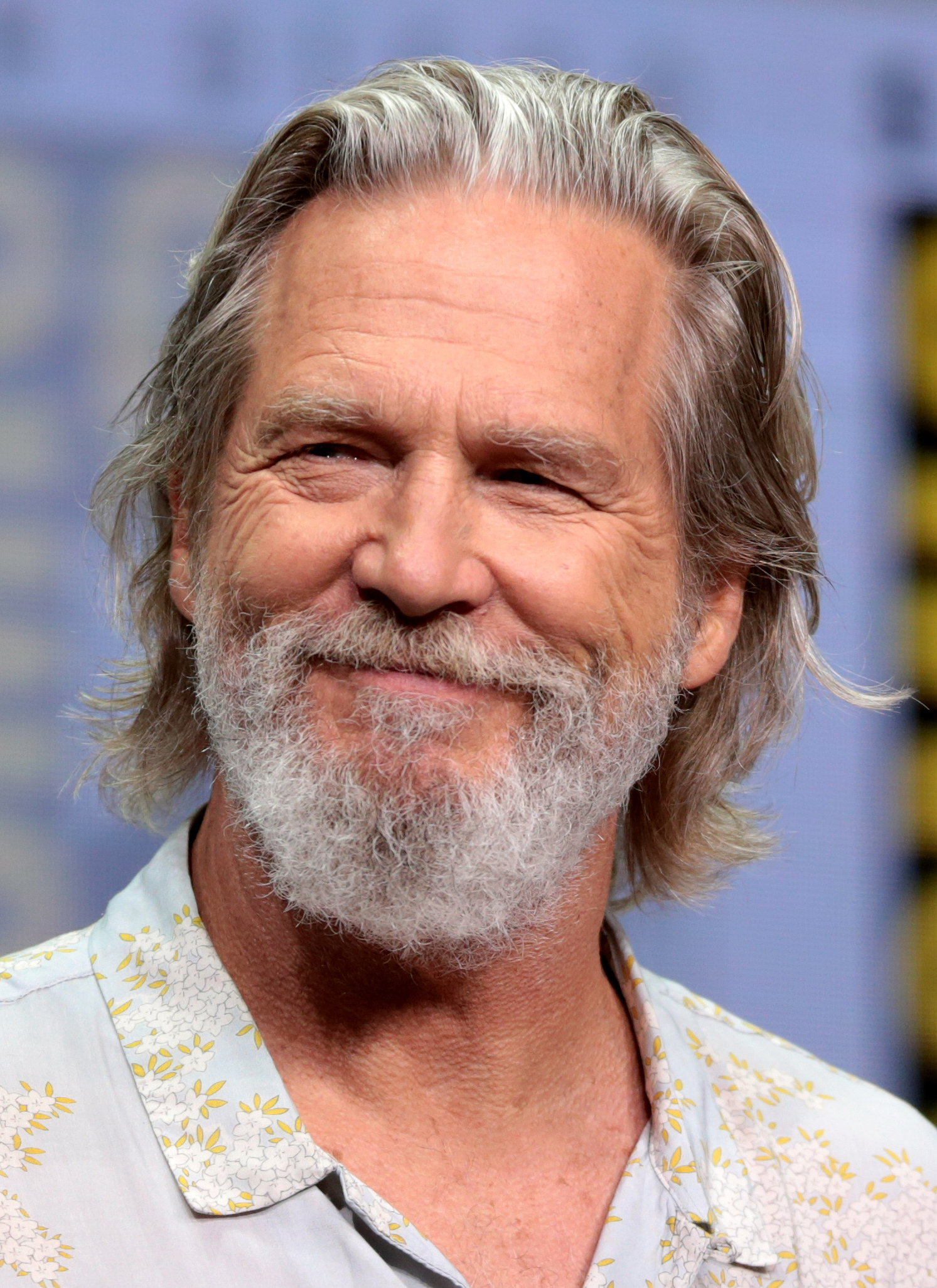
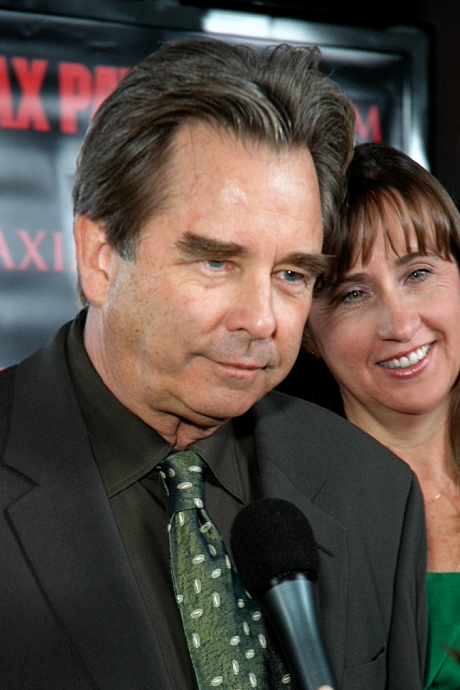
Brothers Jeff Bridges (left) and Beau Bridges (right) were cast as Jack and Frank Baker. Jeff suggested Beau for the role of Frank to writer-director Steve Kloves, who was at first apprehensive about casting real-life brothers as on-screen siblings.

Kloves, Rosenberg, and Weinstein personally visited Jeff Bridges at his home in Montana to offer him the role of Jack Baker. After spending an afternoon asking Kloves various questions about the film, Jeff accepted because "I've had very good luck with first-time directors." Shortly after being cast, Jeff suggested his own older brother Beau Bridges for the role of Jack's older brother Frank. Initially reluctant to entertain the "gimmick" of casting brothers as on-screen siblings, Kloves relented upon meeting Beau for the first time at a restaurant. According to Kloves, "I saw Beau walk into the restaurant, and it just hit me – he was Frank Baker. By the end of the breakfast I decided to embrace it, and it's one of the better decisions I made, because at the end of the day it wasn't a gimmick – Beau was terrific." Beau recalled that the studio had wanted a more famous actor to play the elder Baker, but Jeff lobbied for him. After sharing the script with him and insisting that he read it, Beau was worried that the studio's resistance to cast him would threaten Jeff's prospects. Jeff encouraged Beau to show the studio a Polaroid of both brothers performing street theatre when they were teenagers. Beau believes the photograph solidified his casting. Jeff believes acting opposite his brother helped make their characters' relationship and chemistry more convincing to audiences. Because Beau's character is balding in the script, Jeff shaved a bald patch onto the back of Beau's head for the film. The Fabulous Baker Boys was the first and only time Jeff and Beau appeared in the same film.

While the film was under Hill's direction, Kloves suggested singer Whitney Houston for the female lead. Although Jeff believes he was the first actor cast in the film, Michelle Pfeiffer claims Kloves originally approached her five years before the film was made, but the studio was not interested in casting her at the time. Kloves clarified that although he had been interested in both Pfeiffer and Jeff from the beginning, Pfeiffer proved difficult to contact at the time, therefore he cast Jeff first in the interim. Without an actress secured for the female lead, both the cast and crew were momentarily concerned about the film's progress. Several actresses were considered for the role of lounge singer Susie Diamond, including Jodie Foster, Jennifer Jason Leigh, and Debra Winger. Singer Madonna turned down the role because she found the film "too mushy".

Despite liking the script, Pfeiffer was hesitant to commit to another film due to having just recently completed several prestigious projects in a row. She had originally planned to go on hiatus after filming Dangerous Liaisons (1988) until Kloves convinced her otherwise over the course of visiting her at her home for a week. Drawn to the character of Susie, the actress described her as "one of the most alive characters that I've played ... She's a purely emotional creature ... She's not afraid to take risks, and she doesn't lie to herself ... There's a purity in her honesty that I really respect." Kloves recalled that some of his peers were surprised by his choice in Pfeiffer because they doubted her comedic acting abilities, but the director maintains that "she was always funny and adept at doing character humor." Pfeiffer reminded Rosenberg of Marilyn Monroe's performance in Some Like it Hot (1959). Pfeiffer was initially worried about working opposite a pair of brothers but admitted her concerns were ultimately unfounded. Kloves wrote the character of Blanche "Monica" Moran, a waitress and aspiring singer, specifically for Jennifer Tilly, which would become her breakthrough role.

=== Filming ===
A two-week rehearsal took place after the film was cast, during which Kloves observed each main cast member discover how they would approach their respective roles. Kloves was particularly impressed with Beau's process, explaining, "in the first week of rehearsal he went back and forth between being very high and very low ... [by] ... the second week he suddenly found the sweet spot for the character and stayed there with perfect pitch for the entire shoot." Kloves and the three main actors visited local bars to study lounge performers, while Kloves directed improvisational sessions at the Bridges' homes. Both Jeff and Beau had piano keyboards in their dressing rooms and spent several months learning to play the film's songs during pre-production, specifically studying how their musical performances should appear to onlookers. Jeff did not attend the 1988 London Film Festival where he was being honored due to his commitment to filming The Fabulous Baker Boys. Before production began, Pfeiffer was warned that preparing for Susie would require twice as much effort as a typical acting performance, likening the process to "a musician preparing to do an album." On camera, Pfeiffer lip-synced to the songs she recorded in the recording studio.

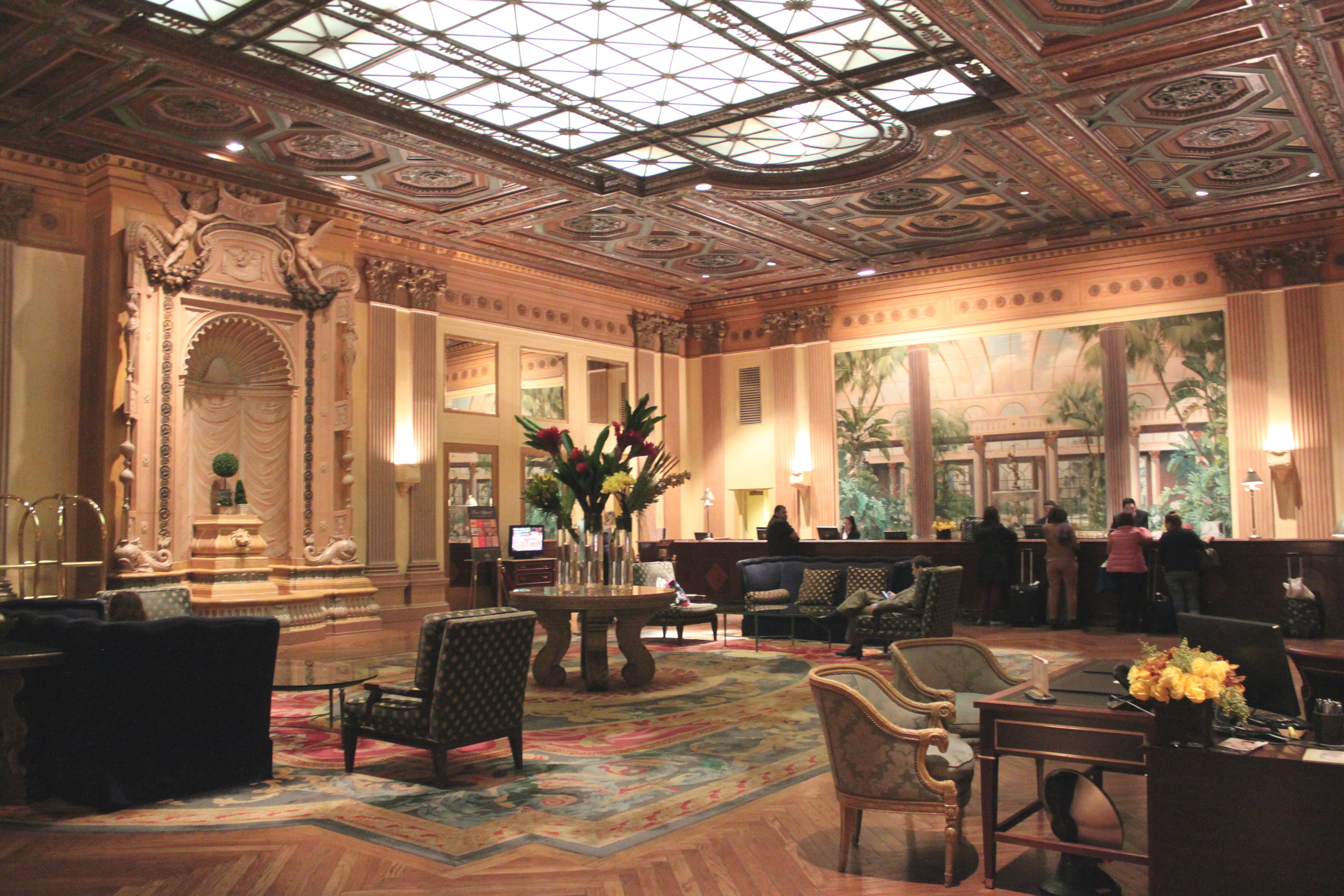
Several interior scenes were filmed at the Millennium Biltmore Hotel in Los Angeles, California, including the film's famous "Makin' Whoopee" musical number.

Principal photography began on December 5, 1988, and was completed over the course of two months by March 1989. The film had a production budget of $11.5 million. Although primarily set in Seattle, Washington, The Fabulous Baker Boys was mostly filmed in Los Angeles, California. Kloves consulted with production designer Jeffery Townsend to retain the melancholy Seattle atmosphere on the Los Angeles set. Some scenes were shot at the Ambassador Hotel, with its Cocoanut Grove nightclub being used for several nighttime scenes. The hotel itself was permanently closed in 1989, shortly after filming concluded. The Greystone Mansion was used for several exterior shots. The Millennium Biltmore Hotel also served as a location for some of the film's interior scenes and musical sequences, including "Makin' Whoopee", which was shot in its Crystal Ballroom. Pfeiffer was originally hesitant to film the scene in which her character sings "Makin' Whoopee" on top of Jack's grand piano. Fearing audiences would find her laughable, she attempted to talk her way out of the scene the day before it was shot, but Kloves persisted. The sequence was choreographed by Peggy Holmes, her first solo choreographing job. Pfeiffer received only one choreography lesson in preparation for the musical number, and wore knee and elbow pads during rehearsals. The scene ultimately required six hours to film; trying to appear graceful atop the slippery piano surface proved challenging for Pfeiffer, particularly when she steps down from the piano onto its keys without looking down at her feet. Wanting Susie's wardrobe to accurately depict clothes she could realistically afford, costume designer Lisa Jensen sourced most of Pfeiffer's costumes from discount and vintage clothing stores throughout California, for less than $100 each. Although Pfeiffer's character is intended to appear sexy, Jensen opted not to simply rely on revealing clothing but rather play "hide and seek" with her body, explaining that Susie avoids clothes that are "obviously sexy". Pfeiffer's red evening gown worn during the "Makin' Whoopee" scene was the only dress Jensen designed herself. Fashion designer Ronaldus Shamask designed the black cocktail dress purchased for Susie's first performance, which Jensen tailored to appear skin-tight on Pfeiffer.

Kloves told cinematographer Michael Ballhaus that, aesthetically, he had envisioned the film as an Edward Hopper painting: "I always saw the movie in terms of the burnished red of the booths, a kind of dark crimson with amber light and a slightly threadbare quality, like the surroundings are all going to seed a bit." Ballhaus also helped determine the actors' blocking for certain scenes. Ballhaus claims Kloves allowed him "complete freedom" over filming because Kloves does not consider himself to be a visual director. Ballhaus decided to use "deliberately ugly" lighting during the film's early scenes in undesirable venues and gradually improve the lighting by the time the characters arrive at the resort. Kloves and Ballhaus also favored simple camera movements and opted to reserve dramatic camera movements for stand-out scenes that required higher energy, such as "Makin' Whoopee". Having developed a reputation for filming women, Ballhaus incorporated his signature 360-degree camera rotation into Pfeiffer's scene, which he had envisioned upon first reading the script due to its sexually suggestive nature. Feeling the scene warranted a firmer, stronger appearance from Pfeiffer, the cinematographer also prepared by watching several of her films and consulting with her makeup artist. They rehearsed the scene using a video camera prior to filming the final version.

Jeff instructed his makeup artist to paint broken capillaries onto his nose every morning to demonstrate his character's alcoholism. Jeff and Beau choreographed their climactic fight scene themselves, drawing inspiration from their father's childhood lessons. Much of the fight was improvised, including the moment Jack threatens to break Frank's hand so he can no longer play the piano. While Jeff believes they had neglected to choose a safe word should either of them become truly injured while fighting, Beau claims his brother ignored their safe word to the point where Beau visited the hospital because he thought he had really broken his hand. Jeff explained that although he had heard Beau screaming in pain, he thought he was simply acting the scene very well. The actors also suffered discomfort from the barbs of the wire fence they thrashed themselves against, which they had originally thought would be a comfortable material.

=== Music ===
Musician Dave Grusin composed the film's original score. The score largely consists of jazz music and pop standards, most of which were performed by Grusin on keyboards with tenor saxophonist Ernie Watts, guitarist Lee Ritenour, trumpeter Sal Marquez, bassist Brian Bromberg, and drummer Harvey Mason. The music was recorded at Sunset Sound Recorders in Hollywood, California in Studio 1. Pfeiffer performed all of her own vocals for her character and the film's soundtrack. Kloves described Pfeiffer's singing voice as good but not "professionally great", believing a more professional-sounding singer would have made the film unrealistic. Despite having sung in the musical film Grease 2 (1982), Pfeiffer was never a professional singer, and found the songs in The Fabulous Baker Boys challenging because they are "written to showcase the voice ... so [she] had to retrain the way I listen to music" to sound as though she was singing live, accompanied by only two pianos. Pfeiffer had not sung on camera since Grease 2 seven years prior. To strengthen her vocal chords, the actress enrolled in voice lessons for two months under vocal coach Sally Stevens. Stevens was personally recruited by Grusin, with whom she had collaborated several times prior.

The Fabulous Baker Boys was Stevens's first professional vocal coaching job, therefore much of her coaching was instinctual. Stevens believes Grusin "thought that in my career I had done what the Susie Diamond character had done and that Michelle, consciously or unconsciously, would pick up some things." Observing that Pfeiffer naturally possesses a strong sense of rhythm and phrasing, Stevens worked with Pfeiffer to finesse her pronunciation. The film consists of 27 songs, at least four of which are performed by Pfeiffer, including "More Than You Know", "Ten Cents A Dance", "Makin' Whoopee" and "My Funny Valentine". The actress was mostly unfamiliar with The Fabulous Baker Boys' selection of Tin Pan Alley standards, thus she studied the works of jazz singers Sarah Vaughan, Dinah Washington, Rickie Lee Jones, Billie Holiday, and Helen Merrill for inspiration. According to Kloves, these songs were selected because he found them accurate to the film's time period, lounge setting, and characters. "More Than You Know" required at least 20 takes until Pfeiffer was satisfied with her performance, for which she specifically drew inspiration from singer Linda Ronstadt's rendition. Her recording sessions often lasted 10 hours, after which she would study her tapes at home. Despite this, Pfeiffer's rendition of "More Than You Know" is not included on the soundtrack album, which only features two of Pfeiffer's solos: "Makin' Whoopee" and "My Funny Valentine". After the film's release, Pfeiffer was offered a recording contract for her musical efforts but declined. Most of Jeff and Beau's piano playing was dubbed for the final film, despite both actors knowing how to play the piano. They worked with a teacher to learn all of the film's songs in order to film close-ups of their hands and faces. Grusin dubbed Jeff, while John F. Hammond dubbed Beau. Hammond also coached and produced some of Pfeiffer's vocals. Jeff said his work on The Fabulous Baker Boys has ultimately increased his standards when it comes pursuing future musical projects.

The film's motion picture soundtrack was released on January 1, 1989. Reviewing the album, music critic Scott Yanow wrote that Pfeiffer "does a credible job singing" with both of her solos, while Encyclopedia.com contributor Victoria Price said "Grusin successfully mirrors the feel of the sexy standards performed by Michele Pfeiffer". The soundtrack peaked at 97 on the Billboard 200. According to a survey conducted by Billboard, The Fabulous Baker Boys was the fifth best-selling jazz album of 1989.

== Themes ==
The Fabulous Baker Boys is a character study. In the book Virtue and Vice in Popular Film, author Joseph H. Kupfer identified sibling love, conflict, artistry, and survival among topics the film explores. In a review of the film, Alan Jones of Radio Times described The Fabulous Baker Boys as a "salute to family, romance, friends and disillusionment". According to Pfeiffer, the film is largely about people following their dreams. She identified Susie as an adventurous character who embraces life and is therefore unlikely to "do one thing—including being a singer—for the rest of her life", whereas Jack "thinks when he turns a corner that a bus is going to run over him", serving as his "mirror image". Pfeiffer also identified the character Nina as a clue to Susie's own upbringing. Frank Calvillo of Cinapse wrote that Jack, Susie and Frank "have all been through the [w]ringer of life in one way or another and have the scars to prove it. Yet they each retain a mixture of despair and hope throughout in their own quiet ways."

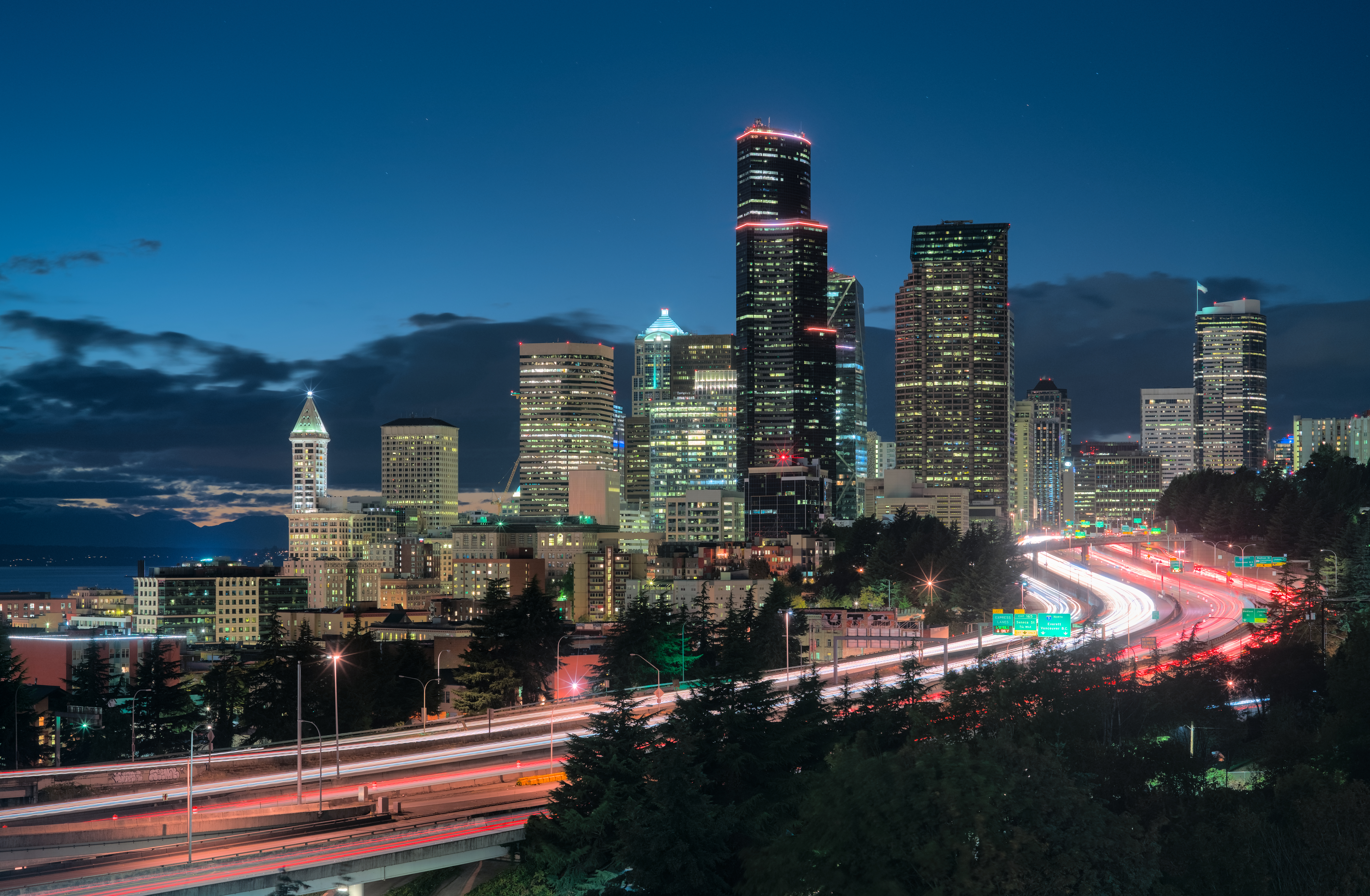
A large portion of The Fabulous Baker Boys is set in Seattle, Washington, which several critics have identified as an additional "main character" in the film.

The group's dynamic changes once Susie is introduced and The Fabulous Baker Boys become a trio. According to the film's blurb on the Golden Globe Awards website, "Susie becomes the agent that makes them re-evaluate where they are going, and how honest they have been with each other." Calvillo believes that while Jack and Frank are cynical and optimistic, respectively, Susie is pragmatic. Jack and Frank also have opposing views on their lives, careers, and Susie. Moira Macdonald of The Seattle Times wrote that, although Jack and Susie are the film's romantic couple, its true love story is between Jack and Frank. Film Threat said, with Susie, "there's no heart of gold. There's just a heart, one that keeps Jack at highway's length, merely working with him at first, but soon enough the attraction happens, though in an atypical way because these two are atypical. It's not easy and it's not love because this isn't the kind of movie for that." Turner Classic Movie's biography of Beau reported that several critics perceived his performance as "partly autobiographical". Film critic Roger Ebert believes "There's probably some autobiographical truth lurking beneath the rivalry of the Bridges brothers, old wounds from the 20 years they have both been working in the movies."

While Macdonald considered Seattle to be as much of a main character as the film's cast, Calvillo argues that the city "could be any cold metropolis, and with the exception of cars, hairstyles, and fashion, there's really no telling when the movie actually takes place." Observing that much has changed about the city since the film's initial release, Macdonald concluded that The Fabulous Baker Boys serves as "a time capsule, for Seattle and for me ... Seattle and I aren't the same anymore, but 'The Fabulous Baker Boys' — elegantly and forever frozen in time — reminds us of who we were." Film Threat credited Ballhaus's cinematography with "mak[ing] Seattle as alive as the characters, as active as their desires", whereas Jack walking through Seattle represents "the feeling of an entire city, of everyone doing whatever they do, and the sun rises, and sets, and the cycle continues, the same cycle for others as it is for Jack."

Identifying Kloves as an heir to New Hollywood directors Bob Rafelson or Peter Bogdanovich, Paula Vazquez Prieto of La Nación described The Fabulous Baker Boys as the director's attempt to "revitalize the memory of jazz repertoire musicals, the appeal of those characters on the margins of fame, the melancholy of a city like Seattle, the value of the story in the heart of the mainstream." Slant Magazine's Chuck Bowen considers the film to be a lesser-known example of the film noir genre due to its depiction of "dream worlds that offer portraits of estrangement and economic frustration", in which Seattle "is rendered ... as a surreal realm that appears to have been ported in nearly unchanged from the backlots of the thrillers and studio musicals of the 1930s and 1940s." Similarly, Stefan Milne of the Seattle Metropolitan wrote that the film resembles "1940s Hollywood romance and glamour" despite its 1980s setting. Describing The Fabulous Baker Boys as potentially "the loneliest mainstream American movie since In a Lonely Place", Bowen credits the director with "fashioning something that's conscious of its artistic heritage without scanning as self-conscious, like most neo-noirs. This is the key to the film's considerable emotional pull, as you're allowed to give yourself over to the narrative's purplish pathos without feeling as if you're being set up for an elaborate, ironic joke". The critic likened some of Kloves's dialogue to classic Hollywood films Mildred Pierce (1945) and Sweet Smell of Success (1957).

== Release ==
=== Box office ===
Prior to its release, the film received significant press for the idea of Pfeiffer playing a former prostitute and the novelty of the Bridges brothers portraying brothers on-screen. The Fabulous Baker Boys was released on October 13, 1989 in 858 theaters, grossing $3,313,815 during its opening weekend. Tickets initially sold well in New York, Chicago and Los Angeles due to strong word of mouth. Originally released in over 800 theatres during its opening weekend, 20th Century Fox head of distribution Tom Sherak informed Kloves the following Monday that the studio would be removing the film from most of these theatres by the following weekend.

The Fabulous Baker Boys would go on to earn $18.4 million worldwide against its $11.5 million budget. Despite its mediocre box office performance, the film proved to be a major top-seller once released on home video, for a period trailing behind the Back to the Future franchise in terms of popularity. According to a poll conducted by Billboard, The Fabulous Baker Boys was the second most rented home video in July 1990. AllMovie contributor Aubry Anne D'Arminio attributes the film's home video achievements to positive word-of-mouth following its four Academy Award nominations. The film was released to DVD on August 21, 1998.

=== Critical response ===
The Fabulous Baker Boys received widespread acclaim upon release. The film holds a 97% rating on review aggregator Rotten Tomatoes based on 29 reviews, with an average rating of 7.7/10. The website's critical consensus reads: "Its story is nothing special, but The Fabulous Baker Boys glows beneath luminous performances from its perfectly cast stars." Metacritic, which uses a weighted average, assigned the film a score of 85 out of 100 based on 25 critics, indicating "universal acclaim". Audiences polled by CinemaScore gave the film an average grade of "B+" on an A+ to F scale.

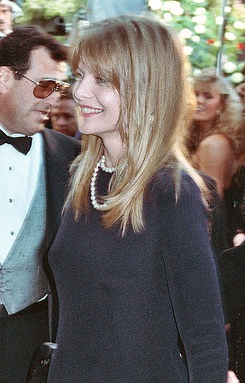
Michelle Pfeiffer's performance garnered universal acclaim, earning her the Golden Globe Award for Best Actress in a Motion Picture – Drama, in addition to a nomination for the Academy Award for Best Actress.

Pauline Kael of The New Yorker said The Fabulous Baker Boys defines 1980s glamour. Praising its performances, Ballhaus' camera work and Grusin's score, Jonathan Rosenbaum of the Chicago Reader wrote that the film demonstrates "plenty of old-fashioned virtues". Time film critic Richard Schickel called the film "a Hollywood rarity", hailing Susie and Jack's relationship as "one of the truest representations of modern romance that the modern screen has offered." Praising Kloves's writing and directing, Schickel deemed The Fabulous Baker Boys worthy of "the protection only large, enthusiastic audiences can provide." The New York Times' Janet Maslin described The Fabulous Baker Boys as a "film specializing in smoky, down-at-the-heels glamour, and in the kind of smart, slangy dialogue that sounds right without necessarily having much to say". Praising its cast, musical numbers and cinematography, Maslin felt the familiarity of its characters "does nothing to make them less dazzlingly attractive", despite finding some scenes and plotlines unnecessary. Roger Ebert of The Chicago Sun-Times gave the film three and a half stars out of a possible four, writing that while the romantic-rivals in showbiz premise had been used in film for decades, "intriguing casting" and a "sure hand for the material" elevated The Fabulous Baker Boys above cliches. Desson Howe of The Washington Post was complimentary towards both the leads' performances and Ballhaus' lighting. Praising the performances of Pfeiffer and Jeff, the Los Angeles Times film critic Sheila Benson called The Fabulous Baker Boys "as salty and sexy and unhousebroken a movie as you could hope to find", while film critic Emanuel Levy lauded Kloves's direction, crediting it with bolstering each cast member's performance.

Pfeiffer received universal acclaim for her performance, with several reviewers commenting on her physical appearance and sex appeal. Maslin called Pfeiffer an unexpected but "electrifyingly right" choice for the role. Film critic Roger Ebert labeled The Fabulous Baker Boys "one of the movies they will use as a document, years from now, when they begin to trace the steps by which Pfeiffer became a great star ... This is the movie of her flowering - not just as a beautiful woman, but as an actress with the ability to make you care about her, to make you feel what she feels." Ebert also compared Pfeiffer's performance to those by actresses Rita Hayworth and Marilyn Monroe. Writing for The Washington Post, Rita Kempley described Pfeiffer as "slinky and cynical, more Bacall than Bacall. Like the sun through a magnifying glass, she burns an image on the screen." Awarding Pfeiffer the title ”sexiest woman in the movies”, Steve Simels of Entertainment Weekly credited her performance with salvaging the film, with which he was otherwise unimpressed. Hailing Pfeiffer as "the sexiest presence in movies today and an exceptional comic and dramatic actress," Rolling Stone film critic Peter Travers felt the film would simply "evaporate" without Pfeiffer, concluding, "make no mistake: It's Michelle Pfeiffer who puts the 'fabulous' into Baker Boys."

Both Jeff and Beau's performances were also widely praised. Schickel called the actors "better than fabulous - Jeff not quite falling over the line into unredeemable cynicism, Beau never succumbing to the pull of moral blandness." Writing for The Buffalo News, Jeff Simon said "Pfeiffer is so sensationally alluring [that it] might blind you to how good the Bridges brothers are", particularly praising Beau's performance. Maslin felt Beau was provided with his own "chance to shine", embodying "the seniority Frank needs to keep the unruly, undependable Jack in line", while Kempley declared Jeff's performance the best of his career. Despite feeling the film is "hardly original", Time Out described the Bridges as "a superb double act", writing Jeff particularly "manages with very sparse dialogue to convey a wealth of information about a less than sympathetic character".

Although Variety felt nothing is particularly original about the film, they praised the cast and Kloves's direction, predicting Pfeiffer's performance of "Makin' Whoopee" will be remembered for years to come. Although Hilary Mantel of The Spectator praised the film's music, performances and dialogue, she felt the film lacked content and plot, concluding, "its inconsequentiality soon begins to grate on the nerves." Film critic Andrew Sarris reported that, at the time of its initial release, some pundits criticized the film's melancholy tone and ambiguous ending.

In terms of year-end placements, Ebert ranked The Fabulous Baker Boys the 19th best film of 1989, while the National Board of Review cited it among the year's 10 best. The Washington Post declared The Fabulous Baker Boys one of the 10 best films of the 1980s.

=== Accolades ===
The Fabulous Baker Boys was nominated for several awards and accolades. The film was nominated for four Academy Awards at the 62nd Academy Awards in 1990: Best Actress for Pfeiffer, Best Cinematography for Ballhaus, Best Original Score for Grusin and Best Film Editing for William Steinnkamp. The film ultimately lost all four awards for which it had been nominated.

Year	Association	Category	Nominee	Result	Lost to	Ref.
1990	Academy Awards	Best Actress	Michelle Pfeiffer	Nominated	Jessica Tandy, Driving Miss Daisy	
1990	Academy Awards	Best Cinematography	Michael Ballhaus	Nominated	Freddie Francis, Glory	
1990	Academy Awards	Best Original Score	Dave Grusin	Nominated	Alan Menken, The Little Mermaid	
1990	Academy Awards	Best Film Editing	William Steinkamp	Nominated	Born on the Fourth of July	

Pfeiffer dominated the 1989-1990 awards season, winning nearly every award for which she had been nominated. In addition to the Golden Globe Award for Best Actress in a Motion Picture – Drama, Pfeiffer won the National Board of Review Award for Best Actress, the National Society of Film Critics Award for Best Actress, the New York Film Critics Circle Award for Best Actress, the Chicago Film Critics Association Award for Best Actress and the Los Angeles Film Critics Association Award for Best Actress. At the time, she was one of only seven actresses to win a Golden Globe and all four major critics' organizations awards for a single performance. Despite being largely favored to win the Academy Award, she ultimately lost to Jessica Tandy for Driving Miss Daisy, becoming the only one of the seven actresses to not win the Academy Award for the same performance. She is also the only actor to lose the Academy Award despite winning all four major critics' awards. Film critic Emanuel Levy theorized that the Academy of Motion Picture Arts and Sciences opted to award Tandy due to the actress' age and the fact that her film, Driving Miss Daisy (1989), had been nominated for the Academy Award for Best Picture, while Pfeiffer's film was not. Several critics at the time deemed Pfeiffer's loss a surprising upset. Pfeiffer also lost the BAFTA Award for Best Actress in a Leading Role to Tandy.

Grusin's soundtrack won the Grammy Award for Best Album or Original Instrumental Background Score Written for a Motion Picture or Television, while his arrangement of "My Funny Valentine" (sung by Pfeiffer) won the Grammy Award for Best Arrangement, Instrumental and Vocals. The film was also nominated for the Golden Globe and BAFTA Awards for Best Original Film Score, while winning the BAFTA Award for Best Sound. Kloves's screenplay was nominated for a Writers Guild of America Award. Ballhaus won the Los Angeles Film Critics Association Award for Best Cinematography and the National Society of Film Critics Award for Best Cinematography. Beau won the National Society of Film Critics Award for Best Supporting Actor.

== Legacy ==
According to Robert Cettl, author of Sensational Movie Monologues, critics appreciated The Fabulous Baker Boys at the time of its release as an example of dedicated "small picture" filmmaking which they felt Hollywood had abandoned in favor of blockbuster films with high budgets. In 2007, The Guardian cited The Fabulous Baker Boys among the "1000 films to see before you die". In 2008, Entertainment Weekly named The Fabulous Baker Boys the 12th sexiest film of all time. In 2021, Time Out ranked The Fabulous Baker Boys the sixth-best romance film of all time.

The film is credited with establishing Pfeiffer as a bankable actress and leading lady in Hollywood. Ranking it the best performance of her career, GoldDerby deemed The Fabulous Baker Boys as "the movie that really put [Pfeiffer] over the top", describing her character as "some of the best work ever put on screen by an actress". Erin Shelly of the Arizona Daily Sun believes the film "cemented Michelle Pfeiffer's reputation as a movie star." While naming The Fabulous Baker Boys the 24th best romance film of all time, The Guardian's Jane Graham said the film "made her the biggest female film star in the world, and catapulted her to the top of every Most Desirable Female survey for most of the 90s."

The sequence in which Pfeiffer performs "Makin' Whoopee" atop Jeff's grand piano has become the film's most famous scene. The Berlin International Film Festival said the scene "has gone down in film history". According to Adam White of The Telegraph, the musical number "is arguably one of the most famous scenes in movie history", while The Independent's Adam White called it "one of cinema's most memorable moments". The musical sequence has also been named one of the sexiest scenes in film history by several journalists and media publications. In a 2006 article, the Irish Examiner ranked it the eighth sexiest film scene. According to HBO contributor Nick Nadel, the scene has "exploded into the pop culture landscape" in the decades following the film's release. Writing for Den of Geek, novelist Aliya Whiteley believes the scene "immediately entered into filmic language", observing its influence on subsequent films such as Pretty Woman (1990). The sequence has been parodied and parodied in various media, including Saturday Night Live, Hot Shots! (1991), Shrek 2 (2004), and episodes of Animaniacs. A 1992 episode of The Golden Girls features actress Rue McClanahan singing "I Wanna Be Loved By You" on top of a grand piano in a performance based on Pfeffer's. McClanahan has called the episode her favorite from the sitcom. In a 2012 commercial for Topshop, actress Kate Bosworth based her rendition of "Winter Wonderland" on Pfeiffer's performance of "Makin' Whoopee".

According to Turner Classic Movies, Tilly's brief appearance bolstered her career by "alert[ing] critics and viewers to her comic gifts" for future films. Following The Fabulous Baker Boys' success, Kloves would direct only one more film before returning to screenwriting full-time. He became best known for writing seven films in the Harry Potter film series, one of the most successful film franchises of all time. J. K. Rowling, author of the Harry Potter books, had little authority over whom would adapt her novels, but admitted to being a fan of The Fabulous Baker Boys. In the book Martini, author David Taylor credited The Fabulous Baker Boys with helping revive the appearances of martinis, cocktails, and cocktail lounges in films during the 1990s. MyNorthwest.com's Feliks Banel called the film "one of the most critically acclaimed Hollywood movies ever filmed in Seattle".

== Future ==
One year after the film's release, Beau said "there will definitely not be any follow-up" to The Fabulous Baker Boys, claiming "There's not much more to say about those characters." However, the actor expressed interest in working with his brother again on a future project. During a 2014 reunion interview, Pfeiffer said she "would love to see where these three people are... I don't know that it'll ever happen, but yeah, that would be fun". In 2021, Pfeiffer revealed she and Jeff had been persistently asking Kloves about making a sequel.
