= Chicago Film Critics Association Award for Best Actress =

Annual US film award

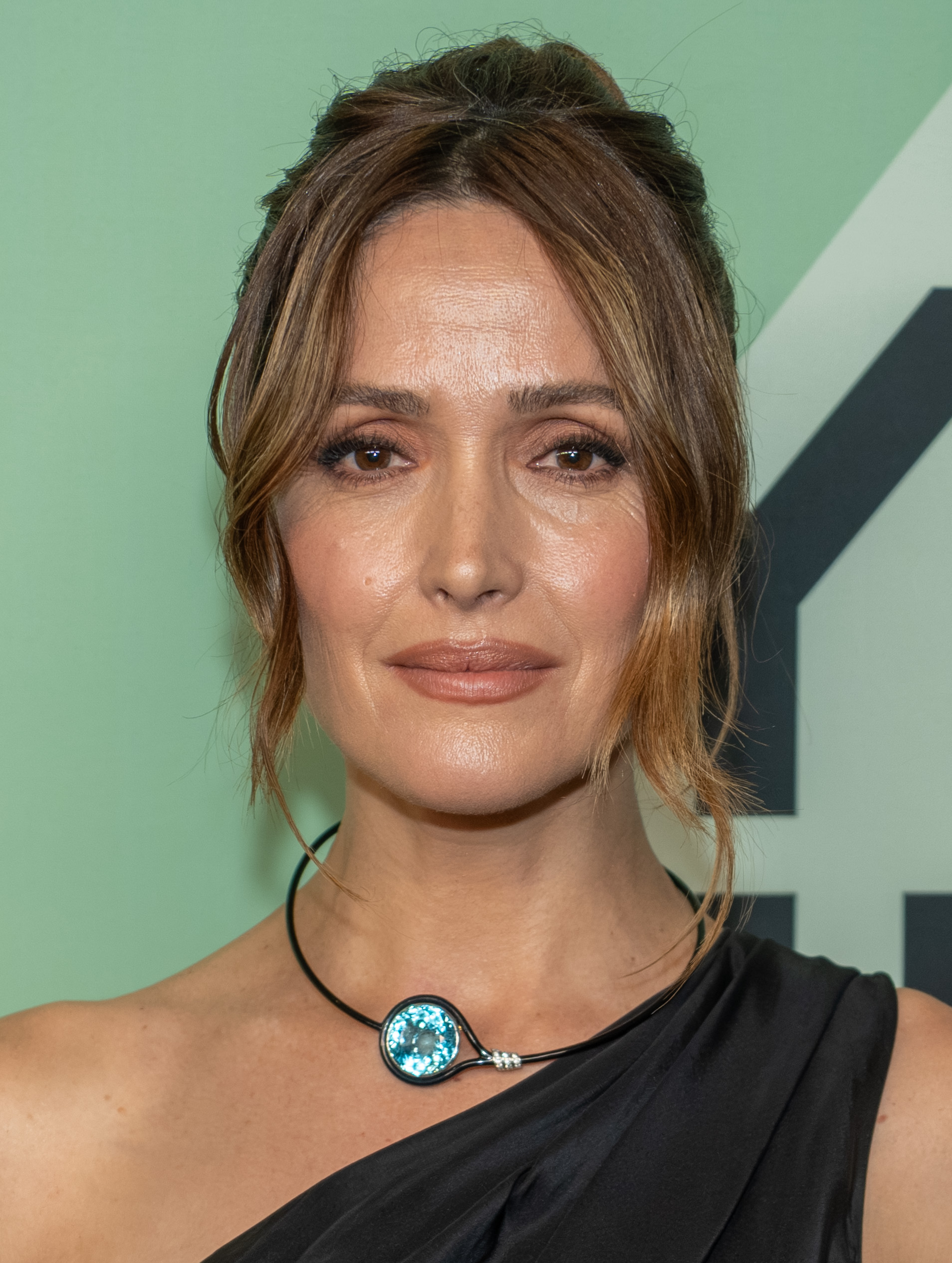
- The 2025 recipient: Rose Byrne
- Awarded for: Best Performance by an Actress in a Leading Role
- Country: United States
- Presented by: Chicago Film Critics Association
- First award: Barbara Hershey; Shy People (1988)
- Currently held by: Rose Byrne; If I Had Legs I'd Kick You (2025)
- Website: www.chicagofilmcritics.org

The Chicago Film Critics Association Award for Best Actress is an annual award given by the Chicago Film Critics Association.

== Nominees and winners ==
=== 1980s ===
Year	Winner and nominees	Film	Role
1988	Barbara Hershey	Shy People	Ruth
1988	Glenn Close	Dangerous Liaisons	Marquise Isabelle de Merteuil
1988	Jodie Foster	The Accused	Sarah Tobias
1988	Meryl Streep	A Cry in the Dark	Lindy Chamberlain
1989	Michelle Pfeiffer	The Fabulous Baker Boys	Susie Diamond
1989	Ellen Barkin	Sea of Love	Helen Cruger
1989	Andie MacDowell	Sex, Lies, and Videotape	Ann Bishop Mullany
1989	Meg Ryan	When Harry Met Sally...	Sally Albright
1989	Winona Ryder	Heathers	Veronica Sawyer

=== 1990s ===
Year	Winner and nominees	Film	Role
1990	Kathy Bates	Misery	Annie Wilkes
1990	Mia Farrow	Alice	Alice Smith Tate
1990	Anjelica Huston	The Grifters	Lily Dillon
1990	Meryl Streep	Postcards from the Edge	Suzanne Vale
1990	Joanne Woodward	Mr. & Mrs. Bridge	India Bridge
1991	Jodie Foster	The Silence of the Lambs	Clarice Starling
1991	Annette Bening	Bugsy	Virginia Hill
1991	Geena Davis	Thelma & Louise	Thelma Dickinson
1991	Laura Dern	Rambling Rose	Rose
1991	Bette Midler	For the Boys	Dixie Leonard
1991	Anne Parillaud	La Femme Nikita	Nikita
1991	Susan Sarandon	Thelma & Louise	Louise Sawyer
1992	Emma Thompson	Howards End	Margaret Schlegel
1992	Rebecca De Mornay	The Hand That Rocks the Cradle	Mrs. Mott / Peyton Flanders
1992	Jennifer Jason Leigh	Single White Female	Hedra "Hedy" Carlson
1992	Susan Sarandon	Lorenzo's Oil	Michaela Odone
1992	Sharon Stone	Basic Instinct	Catherine Tramell
1993	Holly Hunter	The Piano	Ada McGrath
1993	Angela Bassett	What's Love Got to Do with It	Tina Turner
1993	Stockard Channing	Six Degrees of Separation	Ouisa Kittredge
1993	Emma Thompson	The Remains of the Day	Miss Kenton
1993	Debra Winger	A Dangerous Woman	Martha Horgan
1994	Jennifer Jason Leigh	Mrs. Parker and the Vicious Circle	Dorothy Parker
1994	Linda Fiorentino	The Last Seduction	Bridget Gregory / Wendy Kroy
1994	Jodie Foster	Nell	Nell Kellty
1994	Jessica Lange	Blue Sky	Carly Marshall
1994	Winona Ryder	Little Women	Josephine "Jo" March
1995	Elisabeth Shue	Leaving Las Vegas	Sera
1995	Kathy Bates	Dolores Claiborne	Dolores Claiborne
1995	Rena Owen	Once Were Warriors	Beth Heke
1995	Sharon Stone	Casino	Ginger McKenna
1995	Meryl Streep	The Bridges of Madison County	Francesca Johnson
1996	Frances McDormand	Fargo	Marge Gunderson
1996	Brenda Blethyn	Secrets & Lies	Cynthia Rose Purley
1996	Courtney Love	The People vs. Larry Flynt	Althea Flynt
1996	Lili Taylor	I Shot Andy Warhol	Valerie Solanas
1996	Emily Watson	Breaking the Waves	Bess McNeill
1997	Judi Dench	Mrs. Brown	Queen Victoria
1997	Helena Bonham Carter	The Wings of the Dove	Kate Croy
1997	Jodie Foster	Contact	Dr. Eleanor Arroway
1997	Pam Grier	Jackie Brown	Jackie Brown
1997	Helen Hunt	As Good as It Gets	Carol Connelly
1998	Cate Blanchett	Elizabeth	Queen Elizabeth I
1998	Jane Horrocks	Little Voice	Laura "Little Voice" Hoff
1998	Holly Hunter	Living Out Loud	Judith Moore
1998	Gwyneth Paltrow	Shakespeare in Love	Viola de Lesseps
1998	Ally Sheedy	High Art	Lucy Berliner
1998	Emily Watson	Hilary and Jackie	Jacqueline du Pré
1999	Hilary Swank	Boys Don't Cry	Brandon Teena
1999	Annette Bening	American Beauty	Carolyn Burnham
1999	Janet McTeer	Tumbleweeds	Mary Jo Walker
1999	Julianne Moore	The End of the Affair	Sarah Miles
1999	Reese Witherspoon	Election	Tracy Flick

=== 2000s ===
Year	Winner and nominees	Film	Role
2000	Ellen Burstyn	Requiem for a Dream	Sara Goldfarb
2000	Joan Allen	The Contender	Senator Laine Billings Hanson
2000	Björk	Dancer in the Dark	Selma Ježková
2000	Laura Linney	You Can Count on Me	Samantha "Sammy" Prescott
2000	Julia Roberts	Erin Brockovich	Erin Brockovich
2001	Naomi Watts	Mulholland Drive	Betty Elms / Diane Selwyn
2001	Halle Berry	Monster's Ball	Leticia Musgrove
2001	Thora Birch	Ghost World	Enid
2001	Sissy Spacek	In the Bedroom	Ruth Fowler
2001	Tilda Swinton	The Deep End	Margaret Hall
2002	Julianne Moore	Far from Heaven	Cathy Whitaker
2002	Salma Hayek	Frida	Frida Kahlo
2002	Nicole Kidman	The Hours	Virginia Woolf
2002	Diane Lane	Unfaithful	Connie Sumner
2002	Renée Zellweger	Chicago	Roxie Hart
2003	Charlize Theron	Monster	Aileen Wuornos
2003	Keisha Castle-Hughes	Whale Rider	Paikea Apirana
2003	Hope Davis	American Splendor	Joyce Brabner
2003	Scarlett Johansson	Lost in Translation	Charlotte
2003	Naomi Watts	21 Grams	Cristina Peck
2004	Imelda Staunton	Vera Drake	Vera Drake
2004	Hilary Swank	Million Dollar Baby	Margaret "Maggie" Fitzgerald
2004	Kate Winslet	Eternal Sunshine of the Spotless Mind	Clementine Kruczynski
2004	Catalina Sandino Moreno	Maria Full of Grace	María Álvarez
2004	Annette Bening	Being Julia	Julia Lambert
2005	Joan Allen	The Upside of Anger	Terry Ann Wolfmeyer
2005	Felicity Huffman	Transamerica	Bree
2005	Keira Knightley	Pride & Prejudice	Elizabeth "Lizzie" Bennet
2005	Naomi Watts	King Kong	Ann Darrow
2005	Reese Witherspoon	Walk the Line	June Carter Cash
2006	Helen Mirren	The Queen	Queen Elizabeth II
2006	Penélope Cruz	Volver	Raimunda
2006	Judi Dench	Notes on a Scandal	Barbara Covett
2006	Maggie Gyllenhaal	Sherrybaby	Sherry Swanson
2006	Meryl Streep	The Devil Wears Prada	Miranda Priestly
2006	Kate Winslet	Little Children	Sarah Pierce
2007	Elliot Page (Note: Credited as Ellen Page)	Juno	Juno MacGuff
2007	Julie Christie	Away from Her	Fiona Anderson
2007	Marion Cotillard	La Vie en Rose (La môme)	Edith Piaf
2007	Angelina Jolie	A Mighty Heart	Mariane Pearl
2007	Laura Linney	The Savages	Wendy Savage
2008	Anne Hathaway	Rachel Getting Married	Kym
2008	Sally Hawkins	Happy-Go-Lucky	Pauline "Poppy" Cross
2008	Angelina Jolie	Changeling	Christine Collins
2008	Melissa Leo	Frozen River	Ray Eddy
2008	Meryl Streep	Doubt	Sister Aloysius
2009	Carey Mulligan	An Education	Jenny Miller
2009	Abbie Cornish	Bright Star	Fanny Brawne
2009	Maya Rudolph	Away We Go	Verona De Tessant
2009	Gabourey Sidibe	Precious	Claireece "Precious" Jones
2009	Meryl Streep	Julie & Julia	Julia Child

=== 2010s ===
Year	Winner and nominees	Film	Role
2010	Natalie Portman	Black Swan	Nina Sayers
2010	Annette Bening	The Kids Are All Right	Dr. Nicole "Nic" Allgood
2010	Jennifer Lawrence	Winter's Bone	Ree Dolly
2010	Lesley Manville	Another Year	Mary Smith
2010	Michelle Williams	Blue Valentine	Cindy Heller
2011	Michelle Williams	My Week with Marilyn	Marilyn Monroe
2011	Kirsten Dunst	Melancholia	Justine
2011	Elizabeth Olsen	Martha Marcy May Marlene	Martha
2011	Anna Paquin	Margaret	Lisa Cohen
2011	Meryl Streep	The Iron Lady	Margaret Thatcher
2012	Jessica Chastain	Zero Dark Thirty	Maya
2012	Helen Hunt	The Sessions	Cheryl Cohen-Greene
2012	Jennifer Lawrence	Silver Linings Playbook	Tiffany Maxwell
2012	Emmanuelle Riva	Amour	Anne Laurent
2012	Quvenzhané Wallis	Beasts of the Southern Wild	Hushpuppy
2012	Naomi Watts	The Impossible	Maria Bennett
2013	Cate Blanchett	Blue Jasmine	Jeanette "Jasmine" Francis
2013	Sandra Bullock	Gravity	Dr. Ryan Stone
2013	Adèle Exarchopoulos	Blue Is the Warmest Colour	Adèle
2013	Brie Larson	Short Term 12	Grace
2013	Meryl Streep	August: Osage County	Violet Weston
2014	Julianne Moore	Still Alice	Dr. Alice Howland
2014	Marion Cotillard	Two Days, One Night	Sandra Bya
2014	Scarlett Johansson	Under the Skin	The Female
2014	Rosamund Pike	Gone Girl	Amy Elliott-Dunne
2014	Reese Witherspoon	Wild	Cheryl Strayed
2015	Brie Larson	Room	Joy "Ma" Newsome
2015	Cate Blanchett	Carol	Carol Aird
2015	Charlotte Rampling	45 Years	Kate Mercer
2015	Saoirse Ronan	Brooklyn	Eilis Lacey
2015	Charlize Theron	Mad Max: Fury Road	Imperator Furiosa
2016	Natalie Portman	Jackie	Jacqueline Kennedy Onassis
2016	Amy Adams	Arrival	Louise Banks
2016	Rebecca Hall	Christine	Christine Chubbuck
2016	Isabelle Huppert	Elle	Michèle Leblanc
2016	Emma Stone	La La Land	Mia Dolan
2017	Saoirse Ronan	Lady Bird	Christine "Lady Bird" McPherson
2017	Sally Hawkins	The Shape of Water	Elisa Esposito
2017	Vicky Krieps	Phantom Thread	Alma Elson
2017	Frances McDormand	Three Billboards Outside Ebbing, Missouri	Mildred Hayes
2017	Margot Robbie	I, Tonya	Tonya Harding
2018
2018	Toni Collette	Hereditary	Annie Graham
2018	Yalitza Aparicio	Roma	Cleo
2018	Lady Gaga	A Star Is Born	Ally Maine
2018	Regina Hall	Support the Girls	Lisa Conroy
2018	Melissa McCarthy	Can You Ever Forgive Me?	Lee Israel
2019
2019	Lupita Nyong'o	Us	Adelaide Wilson / Red
2019	Awkwafina	The Farewell	Billi Wang
2019	Scarlett Johansson	Marriage Story	Nicole Barber
2019	Elisabeth Moss	Her Smell	Becky Something
2019	Renée Zellweger	Judy	Judy Garland

=== 2020s ===
Year	Winner and nominees	Film	Role
2020
2020	Frances McDormand	Nomadland	Fern
2020	Jessie Buckley	I'm Thinking of Ending Things	Young Woman
2020	Carrie Coon	The Nest	Allison O'Hara
2020	Viola Davis	Ma Rainey's Black Bottom	Ma Rainey
2020	Carey Mulligan	Promising Young Woman	Cassandra "Cassie" Thomas
2021
2021	Kristen Stewart	Spencer	Princess Diana
2021	Jessica Chastain	The Eyes of Tammy Faye	Tammy Faye Bakker
2021	Olivia Colman	The Lost Daughter	Leda Caruso
2021	Alana Haim	Licorice Pizza	Alana Kane
2021	Agathe Rousselle	Titane	Alexia / Adrien
2022
2022	Cate Blanchett	Tár	Lydia Tár
2022	Ana de Armas	Blonde	Norma Jeane Mortenson / Marilyn Monroe
2022	Mia Goth	Pearl	Pearl
2022	Andrea Riseborough	To Leslie	Leslie Rowlands
2022	Michelle Yeoh	Everything Everywhere All at Once	Evelyn Quan Wang
2023	Emma Stone	Poor Things	Bella Baxter
2023	Lily Gladstone	Killers of the Flower Moon	Mollie Kyle
2023	Sandra Hüller	Anatomy of a Fall	Sandra Voyter
2023	Natalie Portman	May December	Elizabeth Berry
2023	Margot Robbie	Barbie	Barbie
2024	Marianne Jean-Baptiste	Hard Truths	Pansey
2024	Cynthia Erivo	Wicked	Elphaba Thropp
2024	Mikey Madison	Anora	Anora "Ani" Mikheeva
2024	Demi Moore	The Substance	Elisabeth Sparkle
2024	Léa Seydoux	The Beast	Gabrielle
2025	Rose Byrne	If I Had Legs I'd Kick You	Linda
2025	Jessie Buckley	Hamnet	Agnes Shakespeare
2025	Jennifer Lawrence	Die My Love	Grace
2025	Amanda Seyfried	The Testament of Ann Lee	Ann Lee
2025	Tessa Thompson	Hedda	Hedda Gabler
