= Citizen Cohn =

- DVD cover
- Genre: Biographical drama
- Based on: Citizen Cohn by Nicholas von Hoffman
- Written by: David Franzoni
- Directed by: Frank Pierson
- Starring: James Woods
- Music by: Thomas Newman
- Country of origin: United States
- Original language: English

Production
- Executive producers: Linda Gottlieb; Mark Rosenberg; Paula Weinstein
- Producers: Doro Bachrach; Cynthia Fitzpatrick
- Cinematography: Paul Elliott
- Editor: Peter Zinner
- Running time: 111 minutes
- Production companies: Breakheart Films; Spring Creek Productions; HBO Pictures

Original release
- Network: HBO
- Release: August 22, 1992

Citizen Cohn is a 1992 American biographical drama television film about the life of Joseph McCarthy's controversial chief counsel Roy Cohn. It was directed by Frank Pierson and written by David Franzoni, based on the 1988 biography by Nicholas von Hoffman. James Woods stars as Cohn, alongside Joe Don Baker (as McCarthy), Ed Flanders (as Cohn's courtroom nemesis Joseph Welch), Frederic Forrest (as writer Dashiell Hammett), and Pat Hingle (as Cohn's onetime mentor J. Edgar Hoover).

Citizen Cohn was filmed on location in Pittsburgh, Pennsylvania. It aired on HBO on August 22, 1992. Woods was nominated for both a Primetime Emmy and a Golden Globe for his performance.

== Synopsis ==
The film spans Cohn's life from childhood through his initial rise to power as Joseph McCarthy's right-hand man in the Senate subcommittee hearings of the 1950s, and eventually to his public discrediting a month before his death from AIDS in 1986. It is told mostly in flashback as Cohn lies dying at a hospital in Bethesda, Maryland, hallucinating that his many enemies — from Robert F. Kennedy to Ethel Rosenberg, a convicted Communist spy Cohn had sent to the electric chair — are haunting him.

The film deals with troubling aspects of Cohn's life, such as his closeted homosexuality and the measure of his culpability during the McCarthy era. While the movie portrays Cohn in a decidedly unsympathetic light, it also depicts episodes in his life, such as the death of his beloved mother, in which he showed a more humane, compassionate side.

== Cast ==
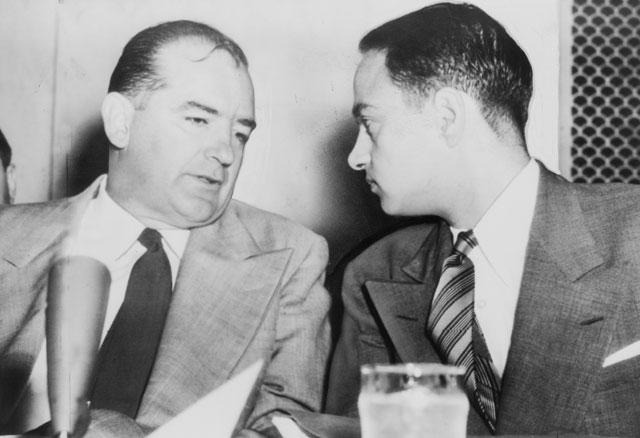
The real Roy Cohn (right) with Joseph McCarthy

- James Woods as Roy Cohn
- Joe Don Baker as Senator Joseph McCarthy
- Joseph Bologna as Walter Winchell
- Ed Flanders as Joseph N. Welch
- Jeffrey Nordling as G. David Schine
- Frederic Forrest as Dashiell Hammett
- Lee Grant as Dora Cohn
- Pat Hingle as J. Edgar Hoover
- John McMartin as 'Older Doctor'
- Karen Ludwig as Ethel Rosenberg
- Josef Sommer as Albert C. Cohn
- Daniel Benzali as Cardinal Francis Spellman
- Tovah Feldshuh as Iva Schlesinger
- John Finn as Senator Charles Potter
- Fritz Weaver as Senator Everett Dirksen
- Frances Foster as 'First Annie Lee Moss'
- Novella Nelson as 'Second Annie Lee Moss'
- Allen Garfield as Abe Feller
- David Marshall Grant as Robert F. Kennedy
- Daniel von Bargen as Clyde Tolson
- Lester Hoffman as Executioner #1

== Score ==
Thomas Newman composed the largely minimalist film score.

== Awards and nominations ==
Year	Award	Category	Nominee(s)	Result	Ref.
1992	Peabody Awards		Home Box Office	Won	
1993	American Cinema Editors Awards	Best Edited Television Special	Peter Zinner	Won	
1993	American Society of Cinematographers Awards	Outstanding Achievement in Cinematography in a Movie of the Week or Pilot	Paul Elliott	Nominated	
1993	Artios Awards	Best Casting for TV Movie of the Week	Mary Colquhoun	Won	
1993	CableACE Awards	Movie or Miniseries	Mark Rosenberg, Paula Weinstein, Doro Bachrach, Frank Pierson, and David Franzoni	Won	
1993	CableACE Awards	Actor in a Movie or Miniseries	James Woods	Nominated	
1993	CableACE Awards	Directing for a Movie or Miniseries	Frank Pierson	Won	
1993	CableACE Awards	Writing a Movie or Miniseries	David Franzoni	Nominated	
1993	CableACE Awards	Art Direction in a Dramatic Special or Series/Theatrical Special/Movie or Miniseries	Gary Kosko	Nominated	
1993	CableACE Awards	Direction of Photography and/or Lighting Direction in a Dramatic or Theatrical Special/Movie or Miniseries	Paul Elliott	Nominated	
1993	CableACE Awards	Editing a Dramatic Special or Series/Theatrical Special/Movie or Mini-Series	Peter Zinner	Nominated	
1993	CableACE Awards	Make-Up	Deborah La Mia Denaver and Matthew W. Mungle	Nominated	
1993	Directors Guild of America Awards	Outstanding Directorial Achievement in Dramatic Specials	Frank Pierson	Nominated	
1993	Golden Globe Awards	Best Miniseries or Motion Picture Made for Television		Nominated	
1993	Golden Globe Awards	Best Actor in a Miniseries or Motion Picture Made for Television	James Woods	Nominated	
1993	Primetime Emmy Awards	Outstanding Made for Television Movie	Mark Rosenberg, Paula Weinstein, Linda Gottlieb, and Doro Bachrach	Nominated	
1993	Primetime Emmy Awards	Outstanding Lead Actor in a Miniseries or a Special	James Woods	Nominated	
1993	Primetime Emmy Awards	Outstanding Supporting Actress in a Miniseries or a Special	Lee Grant	Nominated	
1993	Primetime Emmy Awards	Outstanding Individual Achievement in Directing for a Miniseries or a Special	Frank Pierson	Nominated	
1993	Primetime Emmy Awards	Outstanding Individual Achievement in Writing for a Miniseries or a Special	David Franzoni	Nominated	
1993	Primetime Emmy Awards	Outstanding Individual Achievement in Art Direction for a Miniseries or a Special	Stephen Marsh, Gary Kosko, and Diana Stoughton	Nominated	
1993	Primetime Emmy Awards	Outstanding Individual Achievement in Casting for a Miniseries or a Special	Mary Colquhoun and Donna Belajac	Won	
1993	Primetime Emmy Awards	Outstanding Individual Achievement in Costume Design for a Miniseries or a Special	Jill M. Ohanneson	Nominated	
1993	Primetime Emmy Awards	Outstanding Individual Achievement in Editing for a Miniseries or a Special – Single Camera Production	Peter Zinner	Won	
1993	Primetime Emmy Awards	Outstanding Individual Achievement in Hairstyling for a Miniseries or a Special	Mona Orr	Nominated	
1993	Primetime Emmy Awards	Outstanding Individual Achievement in Makeup for a Miniseries or a Special	Lynne K. Eagan, Matthew W. Mungle, John E. Jackson, and Deborah La Mia Denaver	Won	
1993	Primetime Emmy Awards	Outstanding Sound Mixing for a Drama Miniseries or a Special	John Pritchett, Dan Wallin, Anna Behlmer, and Richard Portman	Nominated	

== See also ==
- Angels in America
