= Alan Rosenberg =

American actor (born 1950)

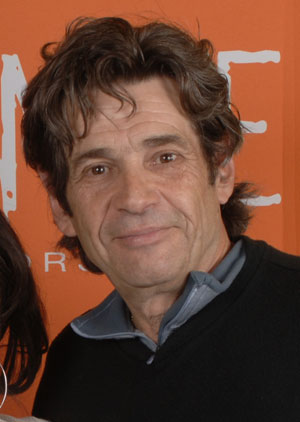
- Rosenberg in 2007

President of the Screen Actors Guild
- In office 2005–2009
- Preceded by: Melissa Gilbert
- Succeeded by: Ken Howard

Personal details
- Born: October 4, 1950 (age 76) Passaic, New Jersey, U.S.
- Spouses: Robin Bartlett (m. 1976; div. 1984) Marg Helgenberger (m. 1989; div. 2010) Marcia Firesten (m. 2019)
- Children: 1
- Relatives: Mark Rosenberg (brother); Donald Fagen (cousin)
- Education: Case Western Reserve University (BA)
- Occupation: Actor
- Years active: 1978–present

Alan Rosenberg (born October 4, 1950) is an American actor best known for portraying the character Eli Levinson in both American legal drama series Civil Wars and L.A. Law, as well as Ira Woodbine on the television sitcom Cybill, Stuart Brickman on Chicago Hope and Professor Youens on Shameless. He also appeared in the films The Wanderers (1979) and Robots (2005). From 2005 to 2009, Rosenberg was president of the Screen Actors Guild.

== Early life, family and education ==
Rosenberg was born on October 4, 1950, and raised in Passaic, New Jersey, in a Conservative Judaism household. Rosenberg's late brother, Mark, was a political activist in the 1960s, later a film producer. Their first cousin, also from Passaic, is musician/songwriter Donald Fagen, co-founder of the group Steely Dan. He graduated from Passaic High School.

Rosenberg attended Case Western Reserve University in Cleveland, Ohio, where he majored in political science with plans to go into law. His parents gave him money to apply to graduate school, but he has stated that upon graduation in 1972, he found another passion, poker, and subsequently gambled away most of the money his parents sent him, leaving him only able to afford one application — to Yale School of Drama. However, he dropped out halfway through his second year. His "greatest influence and best friend" while there was classmate Meryl Streep.

== Career ==
In 1979, Rosenberg appeared in the movie The Wanderers, as Turkey. He supplied the voice of the bounty hunter Boba Fett on NPR's adaptation of The Empire Strikes Back.

Rosenberg is also known for his appearance as the crazed "Mad Bomber" in the 1986 cult-classic Stewardess School and Paul Bartel's screwball comedy Not for Publication opposite Nancy Allen (1984). He played Ira Woodbine in the sitcom Cybill.

In 1991, he appeared in the TV film The Boys. In 1995, he received an Emmy Award nomination for a guest-starring role in the hit drama ER. He starred in The Temptations miniseries in 1998 as long-time manager Shelly Berger.

In 1999, he began a recurring role as the hospital legal counsel, Stuart Brickman, on Chicago Hope. Halfway through their final season, he was added to the opening titles as a series regular. He performed in the legal drama The Guardian as Alvin Masterson.

He appeared on Broadway in What's Wrong With This Picture and Lost In Yonkers, and off-Broadway in Isn't It Romantic, A Prayer for My Daughter, and Kid Champion. He most recently starred at the Delaware Theatre Company production of Partners, written by Allan Katz.

He was elected the 24th president of the Screen Actors Guild (SAG) on September 23, 2005, succeeding Melissa Gilbert, who had served as president since 2001 and chose not to run for a third two-year term. He received 39.99 percent (10,748 total votes) of the nationwide vote of the Guild's general membership, defeating Morgan Fairchild and Robert Conrad.

In 2005, he appeared as shady defense attorney Adam Novak in an episode of CSI: Crime Scene Investigation co-starring alongside his real-life wife Marg Helgenberger. Novak was portrayed as a womanizer who encounters Catherine (Helgenberger) in a bar and later became the prime suspect in two homicides. In a 2007 episode "Leaving Las Vegas" he appears as a lawyer defending a client who turns out to be guilty of two separate crimes, and yet the evidence fails to pin him down, resulting in a not guilty verdict which annoys Catherine so much that she undertakes further investigation.

In 2006, he had a recurring role as Bruce Steinerman, the divorce attorney of Dr. James Wilson in the television-series House M.D. He has hosted episodes of the public television program, Life: Part 2, which began in 2007 and is produced in St. Paul, Minnesota. The show features panel discussions about issues that baby boomers face as they age.

In 2015, he appeared as Dr. William Golliher in the Amazon original series Bosch. In 2016, he had a recurring role as shady investor William Sutter on the USA Network drama Suits.

From 2016 to 2017, he had a recurring role in the Showtime series Shameless (seasons 6–8). He portrayed Professor Youens, an alcoholic college professor and mentor to Lip Gallagher.

== Personal life ==
Rosenberg's first marriage was to actress Robin Bartlett, from 1976 to 1984.

He met Marg Helgenberger in New York City in 1984, while guest-starring on her soap opera Ryan's Hope. The two became friends and began dating in 1986. They married in 1989 and have a son, Hugh Howard Rosenberg (b. October 21, 1990).

As a result of Helgenberger's mother's 27-year battle with breast cancer, Helgenberger and Rosenberg became involved in the fight against the disease. They hosted an annual benefit, Marg and Alan's Celebrity Weekend, in Omaha, Nebraska, beginning in 1999.

After 19 years together, on December 1, 2008, Rosenberg and Helgenberger announced their separation; the divorce was finalized in February 2010.

== Filmography ==
=== Film ===
Year	Title	Role	Notes
1979	The Wanderers	Turkey	
1980	Happy Birthday, Gemini	Francis Geminiani	
1984	Not for Publication	Bernie	
1986	Stewardess School	Mad Bomber	
1987	White of the Eye	Mike Desantos	
1988	The Last Temptation of Christ	Thomas, Apostle	
1988	Miracle Mile	Mike	
1989	Peacemaker	David Cooper	Short film
1989	After Midnight	Richard	Segment: "All Night Operator"
1990	Impulse	Charley Katz	
1994	On Hope	Arnie	Short film
2001	Reaching Normal	Frank	
2002	The Bum	The Bum	Short film
2005	Robots	Jack Hammer	Voice role
2008	Righteous Kill	Stein	
2008	Welcome to Los Feliz	Bob White	
2014	Still Here	Stan	Short film
shelved	The Next Cassavetes	SAG Rep	unfinished – concept promoted in 2010, scenes filmed in 2016

=== Television ===
Year	Title	Role	Notes
1978	Barnaby Jones	Ray Reed	Episode: "Memory of a Nightmare"
1981	Texas	Doctor	Soap opera, 1 episode
1982	Nine to Five	Instructor	Episode: "Real Men Don't Make Quiche"
1985	Robert Kennedy and His Times	Jack Newfield	Miniseries, main cast
1985	Kojak: The Belarus File	Lustig	TV movie
1986	Promise	Dr. Pressman	TV movie
1987	The Days and Nights of Molly Dodd	Martin Storm	Episode: "Here's Why Good Guys Sometimes Wear Black"
1987	The King of Love	Jay Schoen	TV movie
1989	Capone Behind Bars	Frank Nitti	TV movie
1989	Coach	Professor John Sterling	Episode: "Kelly and the Professor"
1989	The Preppie Murder	Dan Levin	TV movie
1989	Empty Nest	Professor Brooks	Episode: "Overdue for a Job"
1989–1994	L.A. Law	Eli Levinson, Lawyer William Wills	Main cast (season 8)
1990	Bar Girls	Miles	TV movie
1990	Parker Kane	Morris	TV movie
1990	Lucky Chances	Costa	Miniseries, supporting cast
1990	Midnight Caller	J.D. Stillwell	2 episodes
1990	Over My Dead Body	Kurt	Episode: "Dead Air"
1991	The Boys	Psychiatrist	TV movie
1991	...And Then She Was Gone	Alan Dunlap	TV movie
1991–1993	Civil Wars	Eli Levinson	Main cast
1993	The Tommyknockers	Jack Kimble	Miniseries, episode: "Part 1"
1993	Partners	Unknown role	TV movie
1994	ER	Samuel Gasner	Episode: "Into That Good Night"
1994	Witch Hunt	N.J. Gottlieb	TV movie
1995	Freaky Friday	Bill Davidson	TV movie
1995	Aaahh!!! Real Monsters	Huckter, Skater	1 episode (voice role)
1995–1998	Cybill	Ira Woodbine, Zechariah	Main cast
1996	On Seventh Avenue	Phillip Reiman	TV movie
1996	Undue Influence	Harry Hines	TV movie
1996	Rugrats	Mr. Dreidel, TV Announcer	Episode: "Chanukah" (voice role)
1996	After the Silence	Ned Burkett	TV movie; also released as Breaking Through
1997	Duckman	Dr. Bob	Episode: "How to Suck in Business Without Really Trying" (voice role)
1997	Cloned	Dr. Wesley Kozak	TV movie
1998	Murphy Brown	Max Llewelyn	Episode: "The Last Temptation of Murphy"
1998	Giving Up the Ghost	Jake	TV movie
1998	The Temptations	Shelly Berger	Miniseries
1998	L.A. Doctors	Dr. Keith Burke	Episode: "The Code"
1998	Bronx County	Unknown role	TV movie
1999	Hercules	Boreas	Episode: "Hercules and the Spartan Experience" (voice role)
1999	Touched by an Angel	T.K. McKenna	Episode: "The Medium and the Message"
1999	The Wild Thornberrys	Hyena	Episode: "No Laughing Matter" (voice role)
1999	A Touch of Hope	Dr. Rohan	TV movie
1999	Family Law	Unknown role	Episode: "Decisions"
1999–2000	Chicago Hope	Stuart Brickman	Main cast (season 6)
2000	Level 9	Colonel Lavalle	Episode: "Through the Looking Glass"
2001	A Mother's Fight for Justice	Geoff Stone	TV movie
2002	L.A. Law: The Movie	Eli Levinson	TV movie, uncredited cameo
2001–2004	The Guardian	Alvin Masterson	Main cast
2005	NYPD Blue	Barry Olshan	Episode: "Lenny Scissorhands"
2005	Numb3rs	Judge Franklin Trelane	Episode: "Judgment Call"
2005–2007	CSI: Crime Scene Investigation	Adam Novak	2 episodes
2006	House	Bruce Steinerman	Episode: "Whac-A-Mole"
2009	American Dad!	Lawyer #1	Episode: "Live and Let Fry" (voice role)
2011	Harry's Law	Dr. Carleton	Episode: "Send in the Clowns"
2011–2012	Luck	Nick DeRossi	Recurring role
2014–2021	Bosch	Dr. William Golliher	Recurring role (seasons 1, 7)
2016	Suits	William Sutter	6 episodes
2016–2017	Shameless	Professor Youens	Recurring role (seasons 6–8)
2017	Elementary	Sydney Garber	Episode: "Fidelity"
2017	APB	Professor Malkova	Episode: "Strange Bedfellows"
2017	Training Day	Jack Rawls	Episode: "Bad Day at Aqua Mesa"
2018	The Good Fight	Len Gottlieb	Episode: "Day 485"
2022	Bosch: Legacy	Dr. William Golliher	3 episodes
2022	Mo	Aba Weinberg	3 episodes

=== Video games ===
Year	Title	Role
2005	Robots	Jack Hammer

=== Radio ===
Year	Title	Role	Notes
1983	Star Wars	Boba Fett	Episode: "The Empire Strikes Back"
