= Flesh and Bone (film) =

1993 film by Steve Kloves

- Theatrical release poster
- Directed by: Steve Kloves
- Written by: Steve Kloves
- Produced by: Mark Rosenberg; Paula Weinstein
- Starring: Dennis Quaid; Meg Ryan; James Caan
- Cinematography: Philippe Rousselot
- Edited by: Mia Goldman
- Music by: Thomas Newman
- Production companies: Mirage Enterprises; Spring Creek Productions
- Distributed by: Paramount Pictures
- Release date: November 5, 1993
- Running time: 126 minutes
- Country: United States
- Language: English
- Box office: $9,488,998 (US)

Flesh and Bone is a 1993 American Southern Gothic thriller film written and directed by Steve Kloves.

The neo-noir and neo-Western film stars Meg Ryan, Dennis Quaid and James Caan. Gwyneth Paltrow is featured in an early role, for which she received some praise.

== Plot ==
In rural North Texas, a family finds a mute boy in their front yard. They take the boy in, feed him, and put him to bed while they try to figure out what happened to him. During the night, the boy wakes up and lets a stranger into the house. The man and the boy rob the house together. When the father surprises the burglar, they exchange gunfire. Drawn by the sound, the burglar kills the mother as well. He asks his son if there is anyone else in the house. The boy reluctantly nods, and his father goes upstairs to kill the family's young son, leaving only their crying baby alive.

25 years later, the boy is living a solitary life as a man named Arlis. He has a vending machine business which keeps him traveling all over Texas. At one of his stops, he meets a stripper named Kay who is too drunk to do her job. He drives Kay home and helps her leave her degenerate husband. Arlis resists Kay's advances for a while before they finally fall in love.

One night, Arlis answers a knock at the motel door. It is a young woman named Ginnie, a petty thief he has seen on his rounds. Ginnie asks for help with her car. Arlis follows her to the vehicle only to find that his father Roy is waiting for him. He has been shot and needs Arlis to tend to the wound.

Kay offers Ginnie some nightclothes from her suitcase. Ginnie sees a photograph and asks about it. Kay explains it was her family. Both Arlis and his father eventually realize that Kay was the baby that survived Roy's massacre. Arlis leaves Kay in order to protect her from his father.

Roy has Ginnie lure Kay to the abandoned farmhouse of her infancy. Arlis tracks them down and confronts his father. Neither man lets on to Kay why they are there. As she explores the fields with Ginnie, Roy taunts Arlis about not having the stomach to shoot him. He says he has to kill Kay because she is a loose end, and Arlis will not stop him because they are "flesh and bone".

Arlis kills Roy and takes Kay away from the house. He leaves her at the motel and resumes his solitary life.

== Cast ==
- Dennis Quaid as Arlis Sweeney
- Meg Ryan as Kay Davies
- James Caan as Roy Sweeney
- Gwyneth Paltrow as Ginnie
- Scott Wilson as Elliott
- Gail Cronauer as Emma
- John Hawkes as Groom

== Production ==
Principal photography began on October 5, 1992, and completed on December 26, 1992.

The film was filmed across multiple cities, primarily in West Texas, including Gruene, New Braunfels, Monahans, Temple, Blanco, Wimberley, Coupland, Cuero, Austin, Pecos, Stanton, Marfa, Big Lake, and Valley Spring.

Producer Mark Rosenberg died of a heart attack suffered on the film's location in Stanton, Texas. As the end credits begin, the film is dedicated to him.

== Reception ==
On Rotten Tomatoes, Flesh and Bone holds a 70% approval rating from 27 reviews, with an average rating of 6.2/10. On Metacritic, the film has a score of 57 out of 100 based on 21 reviews, indicating "mixed or average" reviews. Audiences polled by CinemaScore gave the film an average grade of "C" on an A+ to F scale.
