= Mark Rosenberg (producer) =

American film producer (1948–1992)

- Born: Mark Herschel Rosenberg; April 3, 1948; Passaic, New Jersey, U.S.
- Died: November 6, 1992 (aged 44); Stanton, Texas, U.S.
- Occupation: Film producer
- Years active: 1988–1992
- Spouses: Tracy Hotchner (m. 1975; div. 1978) Lauren Shuler (m. 1980; div. 1984) Paula Weinstein (m. 1985)
- Relatives: Alan Rosenberg (brother); Donald Fagen (cousin)

Mark Herschel Rosenberg (April 3, 1948 – November 6, 1992) was an American film producer whose works included Major League and Presumed Innocent. He was the President of Worldwide Theatrical Production at Warner Bros. in the 1980s.

== Early life and education ==
Rosenberg was born at Ackerson Maternity House in Passaic, New Jersey, the first child of Howard Rosenberg and his wife, Martha (née Wechsler). He was raised in a Conservative Jewish family. He attended Passaic High School, graduating in 1966. He attended Bard College and the University of Wisconsin–Madison, where he was an active leader in the Students for a Democratic Society and its protests against United States involvement in the Vietnam War. Mark's younger brother, Alan, became an actor, Alan later said, "to effect social and political change" and eventually became SAG President. Their first cousin, also from Passaic, is musician/songwriter Donald Fagen, co-founder of the group Steely Dan.

== Career ==
He moved to Los Angeles to take a position in film marketing with Seineger & Associates. He was hired as a literary agent with International Creative Management and later with Adams, Ray & Rosenberg.

He became vice president for production at Warner Bros. in 1978. Rosenberg was named by Warner Bros. as the president of movie production in July 1983, making him one of the youngest executives to head the film production division of a major motion picture studio, at the age of 35. Rosenberg replaced Robert Shapiro, whose departure was attributed in industry sources cited by The New York Times as due to poor financial results for the studio's film in the previous 18 months. He left Warner Bros. in September 1985.

He joined Sydney Pollack in 1985 at Mirage Productions, where their first production was the 1988 release Bright Lights, Big City, based on the novel by Jay McInerney. Other films produced at Mirage include Major League and Presumed Innocent.

Spring Creek Productions was formed in 1989 with his wife, producer Paula Weinstein. He met his wife while they were organizing protests at the 1972 Republican National Convention at the event's original planned site in San Diego. The company had a production agreement with Warner Bros., where they produced The Fabulous Baker Boys, and Flesh and Bone, the film he was producing at the time of his death.

== Personal life and death ==
Rosenberg, a resident of Los Angeles, died at age 44 on November 6, 1992, of heart failure on a movie set in Stanton, Texas, during the production of the film Flesh and Bone.

His brother, Alan Rosenberg, is an actor who has been the president of the Screen Actors Guild.

Rosenberg was described as "one of Hollywood's baby moguls" by The New York Times, which noted that "the roll call of achievements in his obituary was of a length befitting an elder statesman of Hollywood".

== Filmography ==
He was a producer in all films unless otherwise noted.

=== Film ===
Year	Film	Credit	Notes		
1983	Independence Day	Executive Producer		1988	Bright Lights, Big City
1989	Major League	Executive producer			
1989	The Fabulous Baker Boys				
1990	Presumed Innocent				
1990	White Palace				
1991	King Ralph	Executive producer	Final film as a producer		
1993	Fearless		Posthumous credit		
1993	The House of the Spirits	Executive producer	Posthumous credit		
1993	Flesh and Bone		Posthumous credit		

Thanks

Year	Film	Role
1993	Flesh and Bone	In memory of

=== Television ===
Year	Title	Credit	Notes
1992	Citizen Cohn	Executive producer	Television film
