= Cloned (film) =

1997 American made-for-TV film

- Genre: Action; Drama; Sci-Fi
- Written by: Carmen Culver; David Taylor
- Story by: Perri Klass; Carmen Culver
- Directed by: Douglas Barr
- Starring: Elizabeth Perkins; Bradley Whitford; Scott Paulin; Enrico Colantoni; Tina Lifford; Alan Rosenberg
- Music by: Mark Snow
- Country of origin: United States
- Original language: English

Production
- Producer: Robin Forman Howard
- Cinematography: Malcolm Cross
- Editor: Raúl Dávalos
- Running time: 120 minutes
- Production companies: NBC Studios; Sid Feders Productions; Spring Creek Productions

Original release
- Network: NBC
- Release: September 28, 1997

Cloned is a 1997 American made-for-television action-drama science fiction film starring Elizabeth Perkins, Bradley Whitford, Scott Paulin, Enrico Colantoni, Tina Lifford and Alan Rosenberg. It was directed by Douglas Barr.

== Plot ==
A woman who loses her son comes to realise that her son has been cloned unethically.

== Cast ==
- Elizabeth Perkins as Skye Weston
- Bradley Whitford as Rick Weston
- Scott Paulin as John Gryce
- Enrico Colantoni as Steve Rinker
- Tina Lifford as Claire Barnes
- Alan Rosenberg as Dr. Wesley Kozak
