= Cinapse =

- Website type: Film blog
- Available in: English
- Headquarters: Austin, Texas
- Creators: Ed Travis, David Delgado
- Website: www.cinapse.net
- Commercial: Yes
- Launched: February 28, 2013; 13 years ago
- Current status: Active

Cinapse is an English-language blog dedicated to movie reviews, home video reviews, editorials, interviews, film discovery and appreciation.

== Overview ==
It was founded by Ed Travis and David Delgado in February 2013.

Cinapse has over 15 staff members, some of whom also contribute to other film publications such as Ain't It Cool News, Chud, ScreenCrush, The Farsighted, Rock the Pigeon, Film School Rejects, Geekadelphia, Hollywood Jesus, Screenfish, Slaughter Time, Movie-Vault.com, eFilmCritic.com, ScreenAnarchy, Movie Mezzanine, That Shelf, AwardsWatch, The Spool, and Rupert Pupkin Speaks.

== See also ==
- Early Cinema History Online
