= Steve Kloves =

American screenwriter (born 1960)

- Born: Stephen Keith Kloves; March 18, 1960 (age 66); Austin, Texas, U.S.
- Occupations: Screenwriter; director; producer
- Years active: 1984–present
- Notable work: The Fabulous Baker Boys; Harry Potter; Wonder Boys

Stephen Keith Kloves (born March 18, 1960) is an American screenwriter, director, and producer. He wrote and directed the film The Fabulous Baker Boys and is mainly known for his screenplay adaptations of novels, especially for all but one of the Harry Potter films (the exception being The Order of the Phoenix) and for Wonder Boys, for which he was nominated for the Academy Award for Best Adapted Screenplay.

== Early life ==
Kloves, born in Austin, Texas, grew up in Sunnyvale, California, where he graduated from Fremont High School. He attended the University of California, Los Angeles but dropped out when he was not admitted into the film school in his third year.

== Career ==
As an unpaid intern for a Hollywood agent, he gained attention for a screenplay he wrote called Swings. This led to a meeting where he successfully pitched Racing with the Moon (1984).

His first experience with professional screenwriting left him wanting more interaction with the actors so that the characters would stay true to his vision. Kloves wrote The Fabulous Baker Boys and also intended it to be his directorial debut. After years of trying to sell the project in Hollywood, the film finally got off the ground and was released in 1989. The Fabulous Baker Boys did reasonably well and was critically acclaimed, but his next shot as writer/director for Flesh and Bone in 1993 fared poorly at the box office. Kloves then stopped writing for three years.

Realizing that he had to return to writing to support his family, he began adapting Michael Chabon's novel Wonder Boys into a screenplay. Kloves was offered the chance to direct but he declined, preferring to direct only his own original work. This was his first try at adapting another work to film. His screenplay was nominated for a Golden Globe and an Academy Award after the film's release in 2000.

Warner Bros. sent Kloves a list of novels that the company was considering to adapt as films. The listing included the first Harry Potter novel, which intrigued him despite his usual indifference to these catalogs. He went on to write the screenplays for the first four films in the series. However, he turned down writing the fifth film, stating that "The fourth film, Goblet of Fire, was really hard to do. I wrote on it for two years. But it’s not that simple and I don't know that I'll ever fully understand why I didn't do it." After Michael Goldenberg wrote the screenplay for the fifth film, Kloves then returned to write the sixth, seventh and eighth installments.

In 2011, Kloves was attached to work on a film adaptation of Mark Haddon's novel The Curious Incident of the Dog in the Night-Time.

Since 2016, Kloves produced the Fantastic Beasts films, a spinoff prequel series to the main Harry Potter series. Kloves co-wrote the third installment with J.K. Rowling.

Kloves produced the Andy Serkis-directed movie, Mowgli: Legend of the Jungle. His daughter, Callie, wrote the screenplay.

Kloves is now set to write the screenplay for the film adaptation of T. J. Newman's novel Drowning: The Rescue of Flight 1421 for Warner Bros.

== Filmography ==
| Year | Title | Director | Writer | Producer |
|---|---|---|---|---|
| 1984 | Racing with the Moon | No | Yes | No |
| 1989 | The Fabulous Baker Boys | Yes | Yes | No |
| 1993 | Flesh and Bone | Yes | Yes | No |
| 2000 | Wonder Boys | No | Yes | No |
| 2001 | Harry Potter and the Sorcerer's Stone | No | Yes | No |
| 2002 | Harry Potter and the Chamber of Secrets | No | Yes | No |
| 2004 | Harry Potter and the Prisoner of Azkaban | No | Yes | No |
| 2005 | Harry Potter and the Goblet of Fire | No | Yes | No |
| 2009 | Harry Potter and the Half-Blood Prince | No | Yes | No |
| 2010 | Harry Potter and the Deathly Hallows – Part 1 | No | Yes | No |
| 2011 | Harry Potter and the Deathly Hallows – Part 2 | No | Yes | No |
| 2012 | The Amazing Spider-Man | No | Yes | No |
| 2016 | Fantastic Beasts and Where to Find Them | No | No | Yes |
| 2018 | Fantastic Beasts: The Crimes of Grindelwald | No | No | Yes |
| 2018 | Mowgli: Legend of the Jungle | No | No | Yes |
| 2022 | Fantastic Beasts: The Secrets of Dumbledore | No | Yes | Yes |

Special thanks

- Fantastic Mr. Fox (2009)
- Alpha (2018)

== Awards and nominations ==
| Year | Title | Awards/Nominations |
|---|---|---|
| 1989 | The Fabulous Baker Boys | Sutherland Trophy; Nominated– National Society of Film Critics Award for Best Screenplay; Nominated– New York Film Critics Circle Award for Best New Director; Nominated– Writers Guild of America Award for Best Original Screenplay |
| 2000 | Wonder Boys | Boston Society of Film Critics Award for Best Screenplay; Broadcast Film Critics Association Award for Best Adapted Screenplay; Las Vegas Film Critics Society Award for Best Adapted Screenplay; USC Scripter Award; Nominated– Academy Award for Best Adapted Screenplay; Nominated– BAFTA Award for Best Adapted Screenplay; Nominated– Chicago Film Critics Association Award for Best Screenplay; Nominated– Golden Globe Award for Best Screenplay; Nominated– London Critics Circle Film Award for Screenwriter of the Year; Nominated– Los Angeles Film Critics Association Award for Best Screenplay; Nominated– National Society of Film Critics Award for Best Screenplay; Nominated– Online Film Critics Society Award for Best Screenplay; Nominated– Phoenix Film Critics Society Award for Best Adapted Screenplay; Nominated– Writers Guild of America Award for Best Adapted Screenplay |
| 2001 | Harry Potter and the Sorcerer's Stone | Nominated– BAFTA Children's Award for Best Feature Film; Nominated– Hugo Award for Best Dramatic Presentation |
| 2002 | Harry Potter and the Chamber of Secrets | Nominated– BAFTA Children's Award for Best Feature Film; Nominated– Hugo Award for Best Dramatic Presentation – Long Form |
| 2004 | Harry Potter and the Prisoner of Azkaban | Nominated– Hugo Award for Best Dramatic Presentation – Long Form; Nominated– Saturn Award for Best Writing |
| 2005 | Harry Potter and the Goblet of Fire | Nominated– Hugo Award for Best Dramatic Presentation – Long Form; Nominated– Saturn Award for Best Writing |
| 2010 | Harry Potter and the Deathly Hallows – Part 1 | Nominated– Hugo Award for Best Dramatic Presentation – Long Form |
| 2011 | Harry Potter and the Deathly Hallows – Part 2 | Nominated– Hugo Award for Best Dramatic Presentation – Long Form; Nominated– San Diego Film Critics Society Award for Best Adapted Screenplay |
