= BAFTA Award for Best Actor in a Leading Role =

British film industry award

BAFTA Award for Best Actor
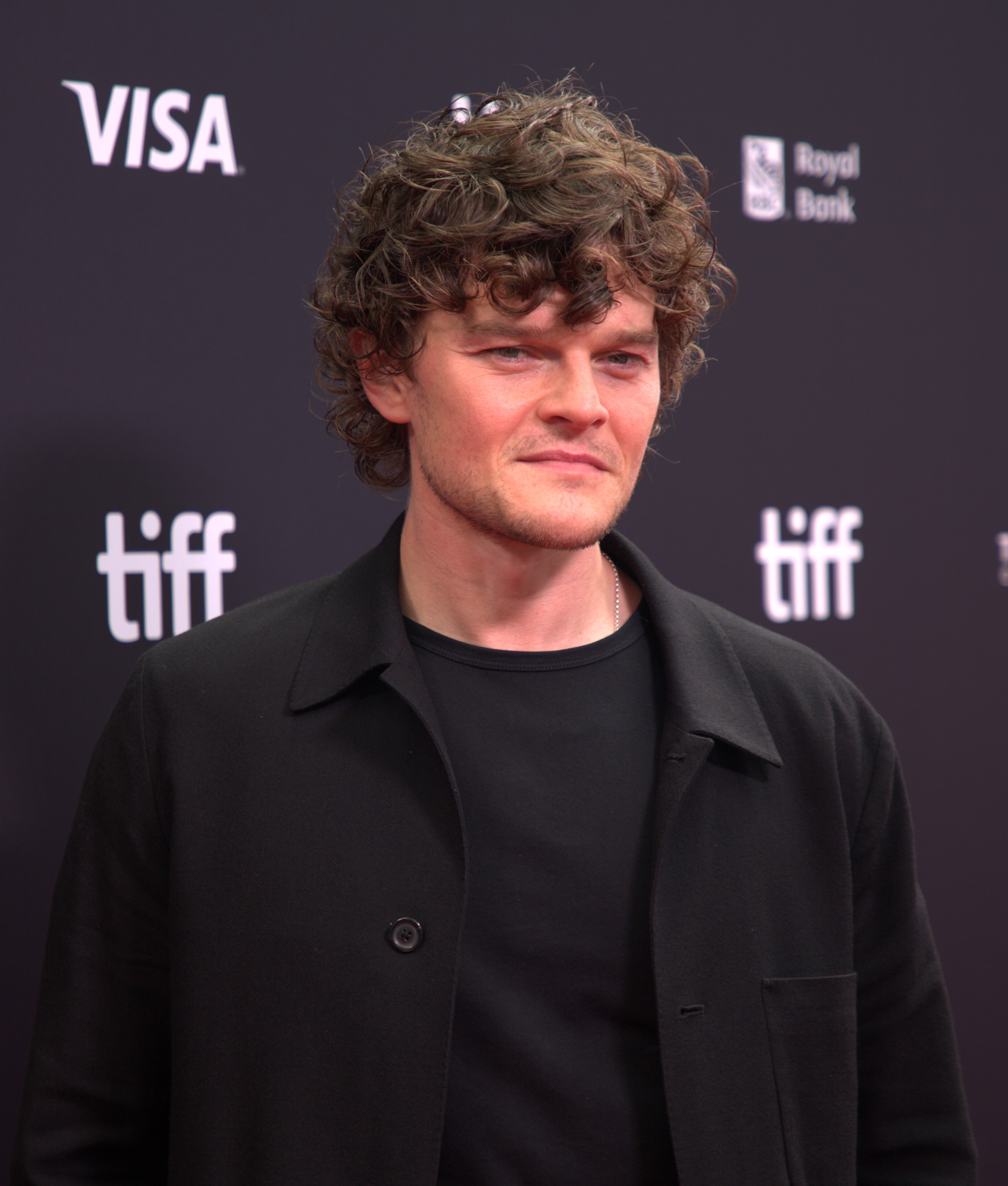
- The 2025 recipient: Robert Aramayo
- Awarded for: Best Performance by an Actor in a Leading Role
- Location: United Kingdom
- Presented by: British Academy of Film and Television Arts
- Currently held by: Robert Aramayo for I Swear (2025)
- Website: http://www.bafta.org/

The BAFTA Award for Best Actor in a Leading Role is an award presented annually by the British Academy of Film and Television Arts (BAFTA) to recognise an actor who has delivered an outstanding leading performance in a film.

In the following lists, the titles and names in bold with a gold background are the winners and recipients respectively; those not in bold are the nominees. The years given are those in which the films under consideration were released, not the year of the ceremony, which always takes place the following year.

== History ==
It has been awarded since the 6th British Academy Film Awards to an actor who has delivered an outstanding leading performance in a film. From 1952 to 1967, there were two Best Actor awards: one for a British actor and another for a foreign actor. In 1968, the two prizes of British and Foreign actor were combined to create a single Best Actor award. Its current title, for Best Actor in a Leading Role, has been used since 1995. Peter Finch has the most wins in the category with five. The most recent winner of the award is Robert Aramayo for I Swear (2025).

== Winners and nominees ==
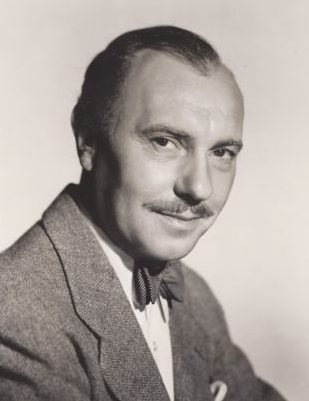
Ralph Richardson was the first recipient of this award-winning for The Sound Barrier (1952)

indicates the winner

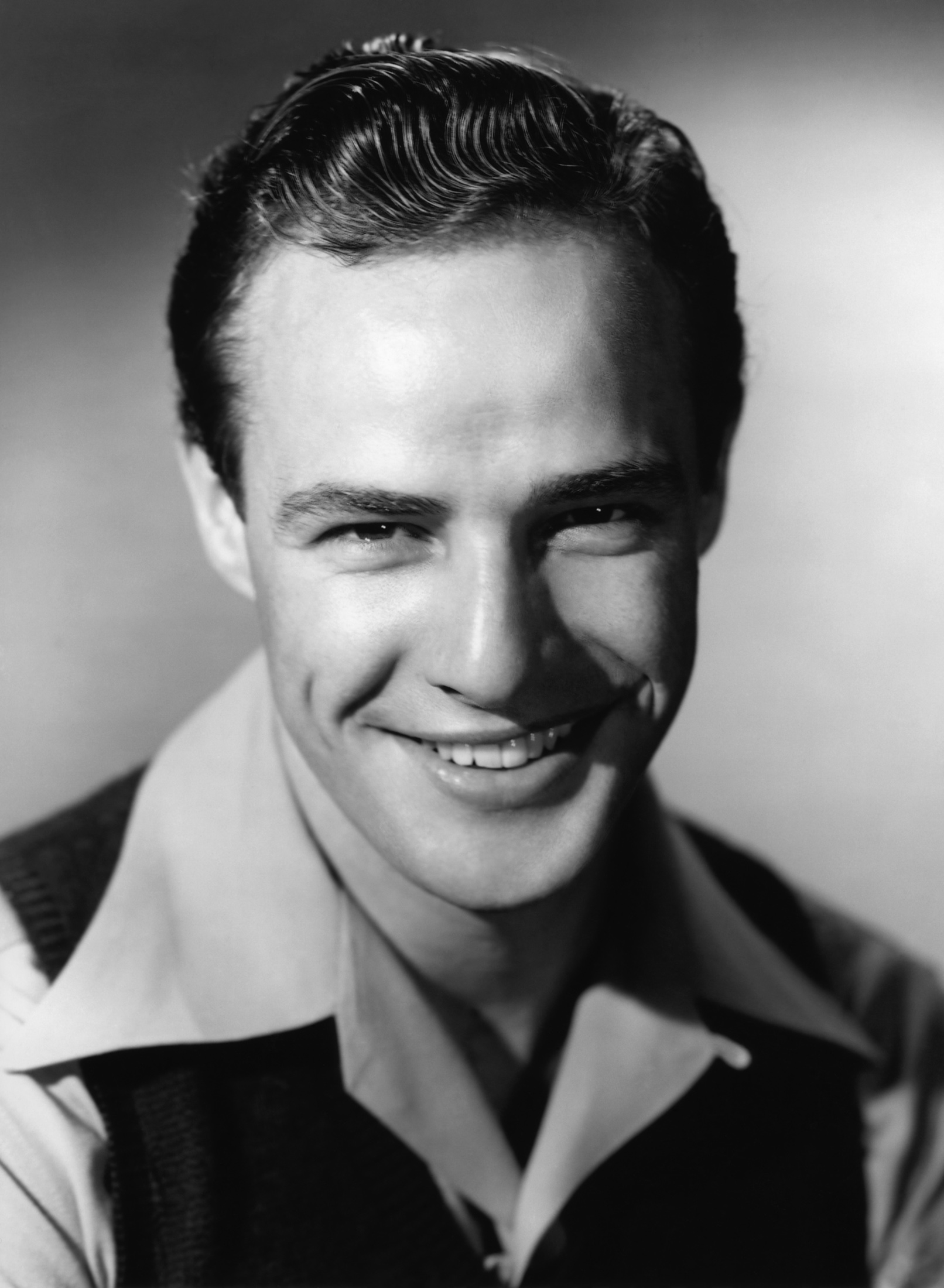
Marlon Brando won three times for Viva Zapata! (1952), Julius Caesar (1953), and On the Waterfront (1954)

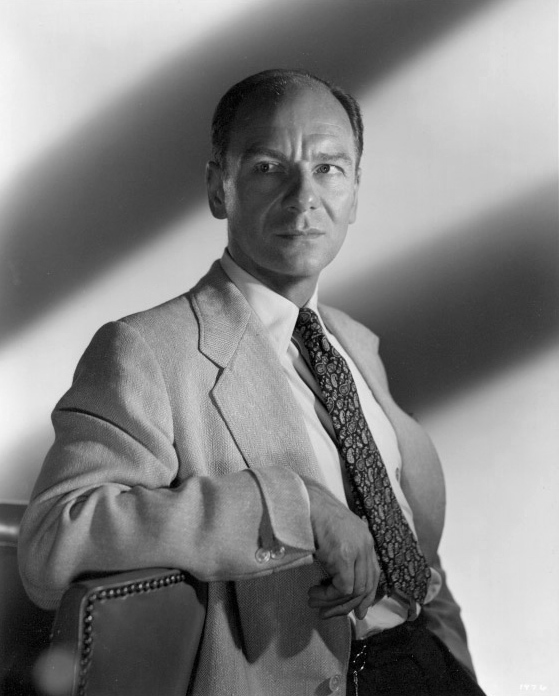
John Gielgud won for Julius Caesar (1953)

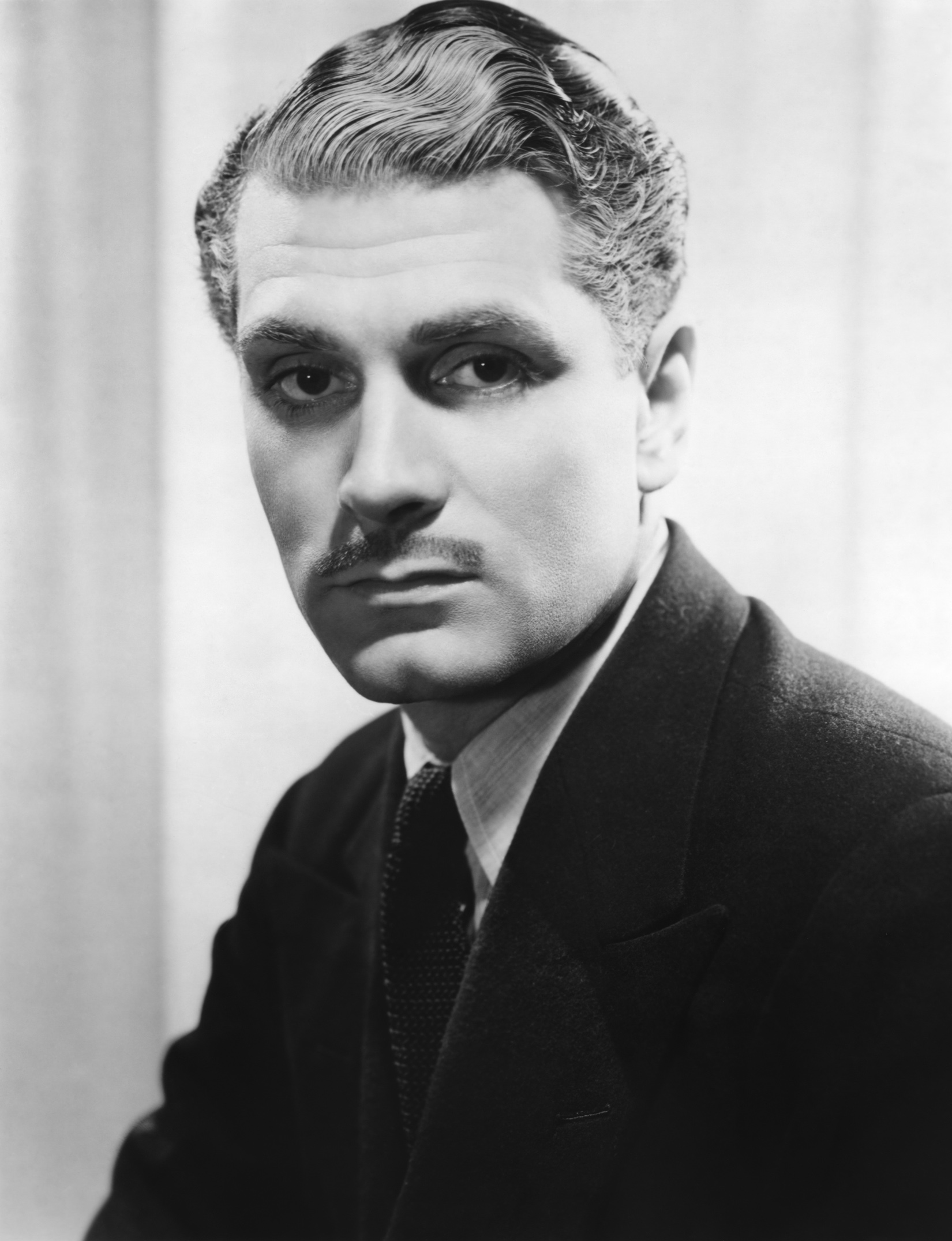
Laurence Olivier won for Richard III (1955)

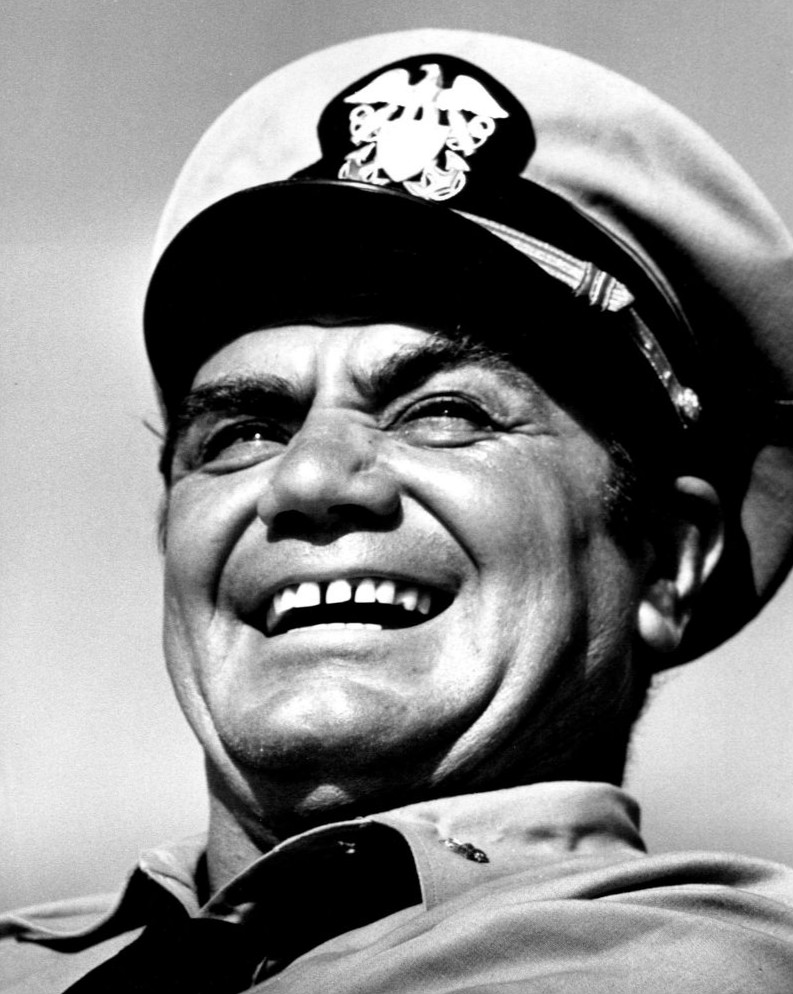
Ernest Borgnine won for Marty (1955)

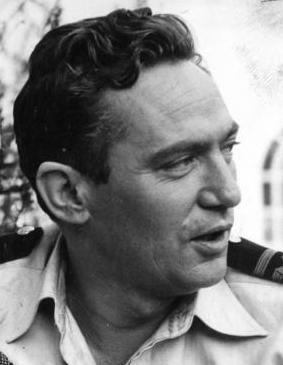
Peter Finch won five times in 1956, 1960, 1961, 1971, and 1976

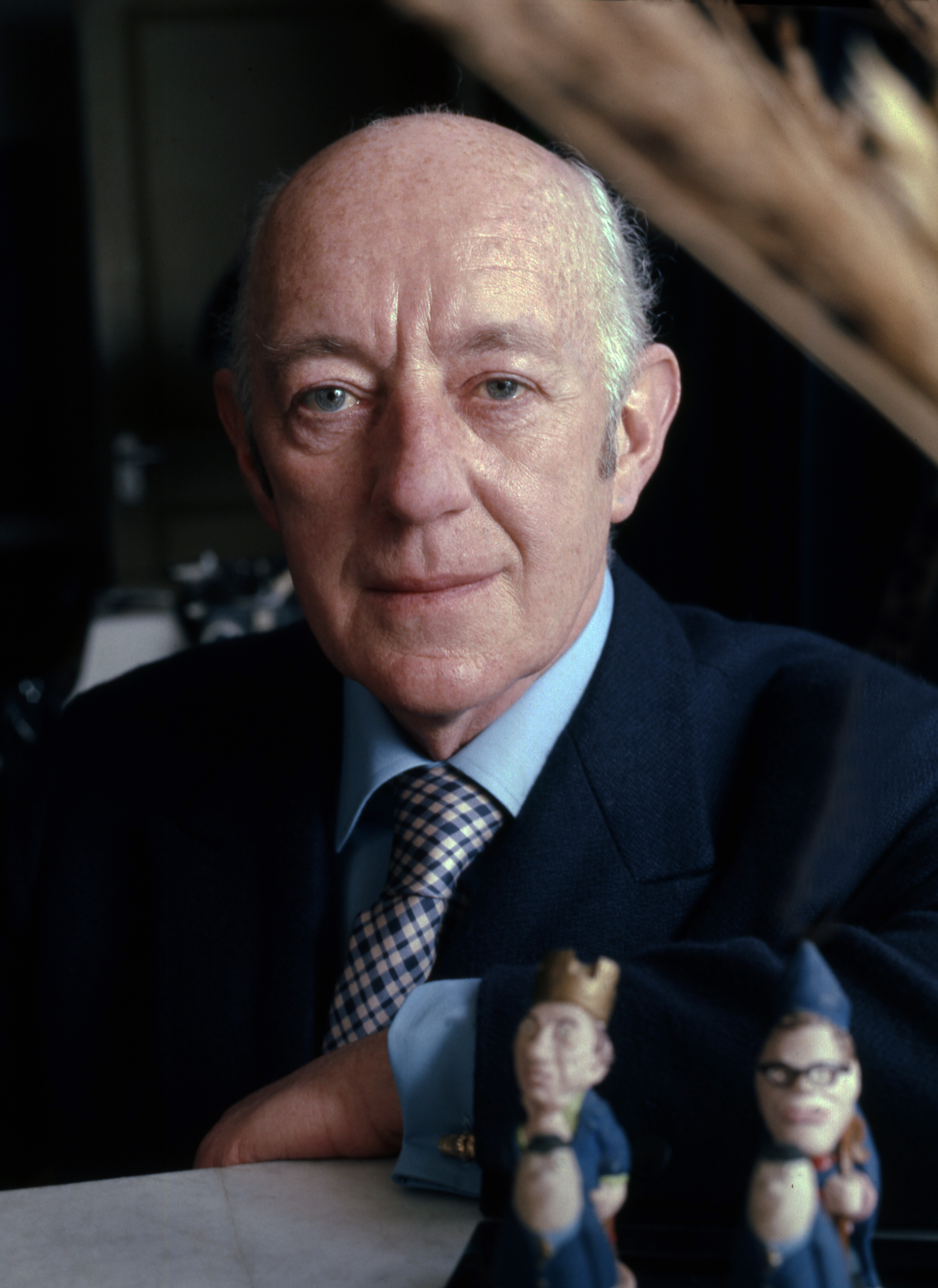
Alec Guinness won for The Bridge on the River Kwai (1957)

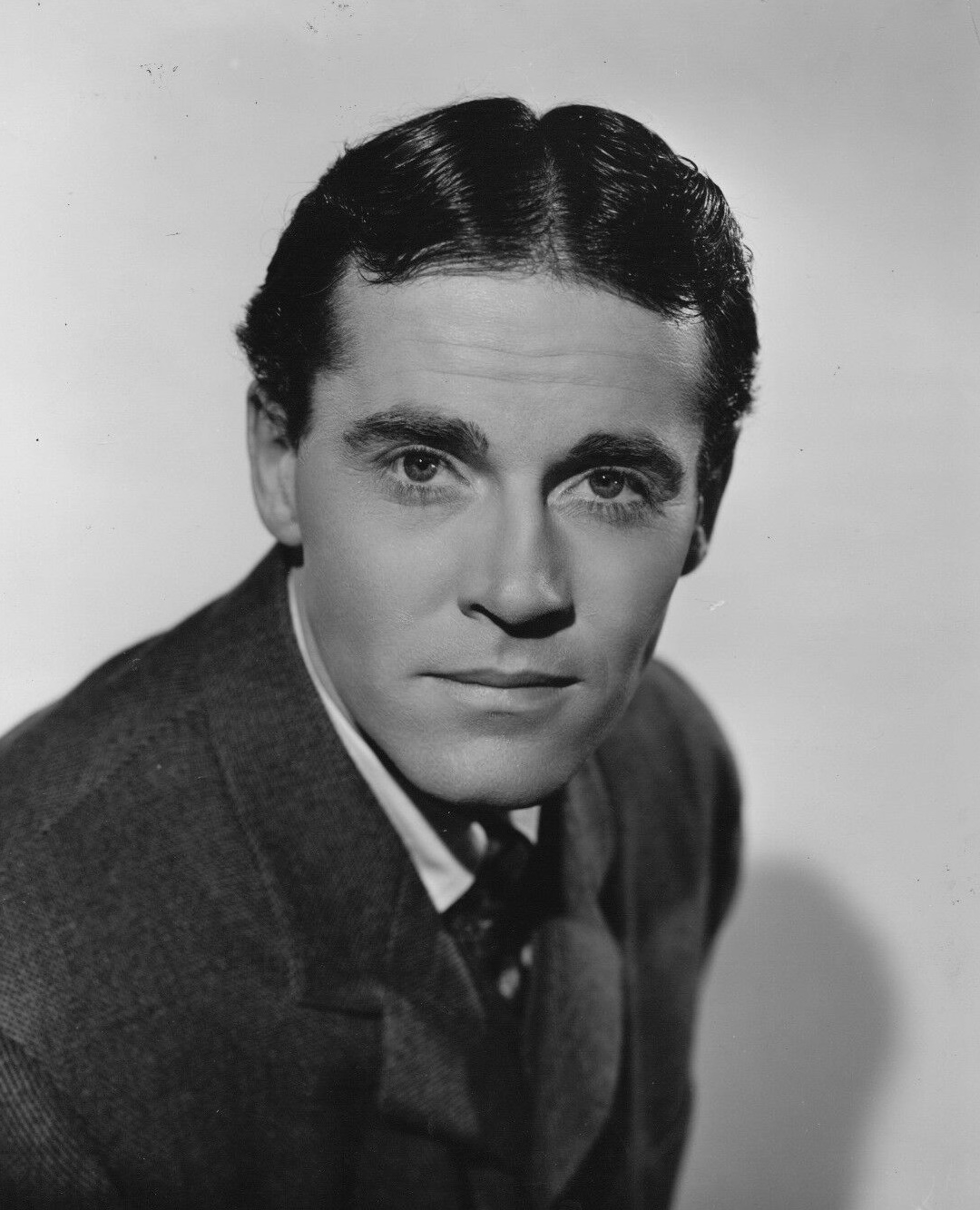
Henry Fonda won for 12 Angry Men (1957)

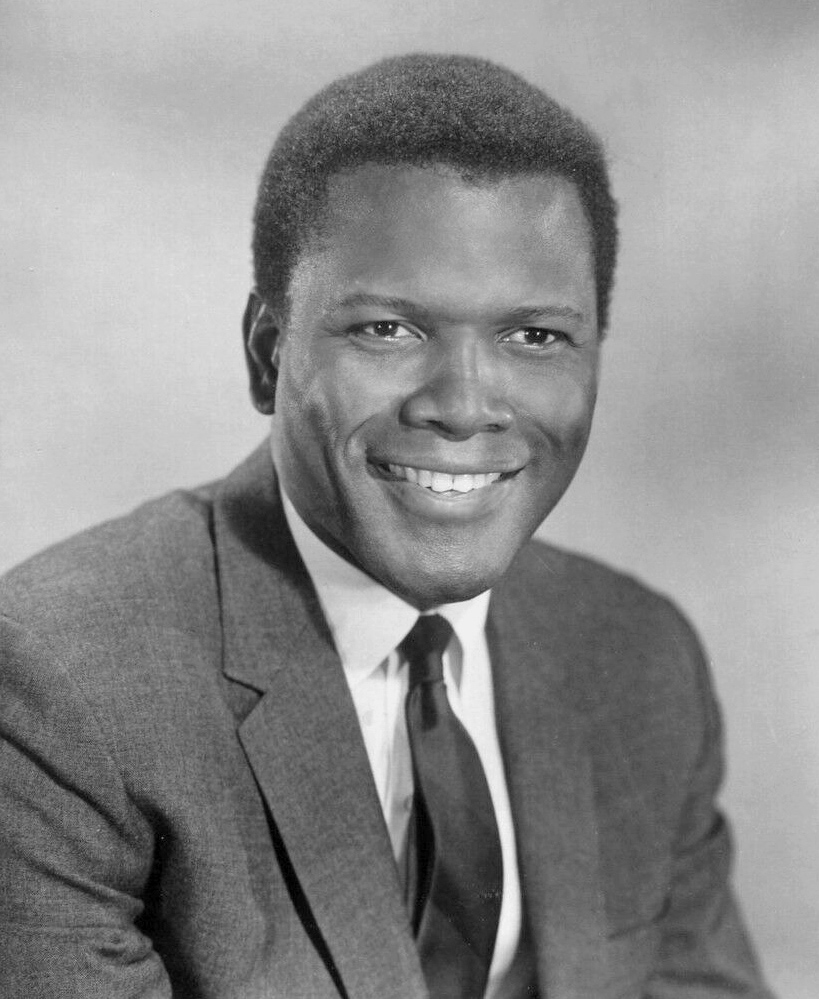
Sidney Poitier became the first black actor to win for The Defiant Ones (1958)

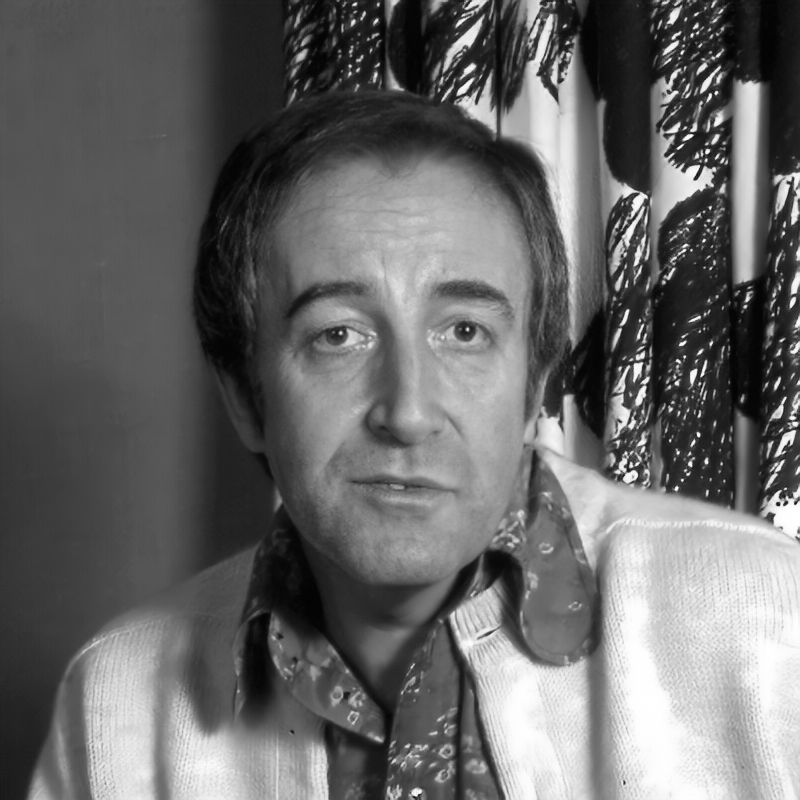
Peter Sellers won for I'm All Right Jack (1958)

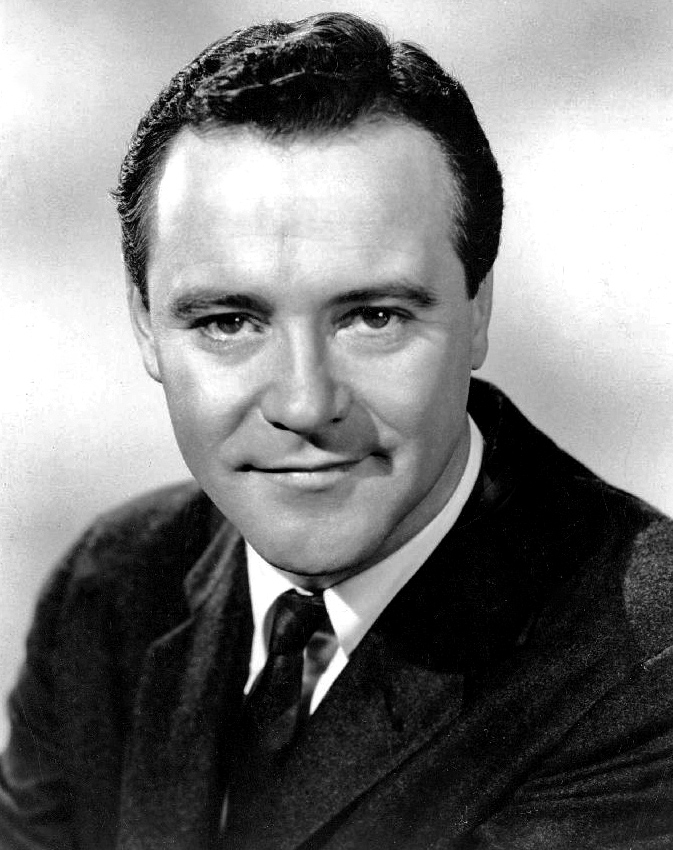
Jack Lemmon won thrice for Some Like It Hot (1959), The Apartment (1960) and The China Syndrome (1979)

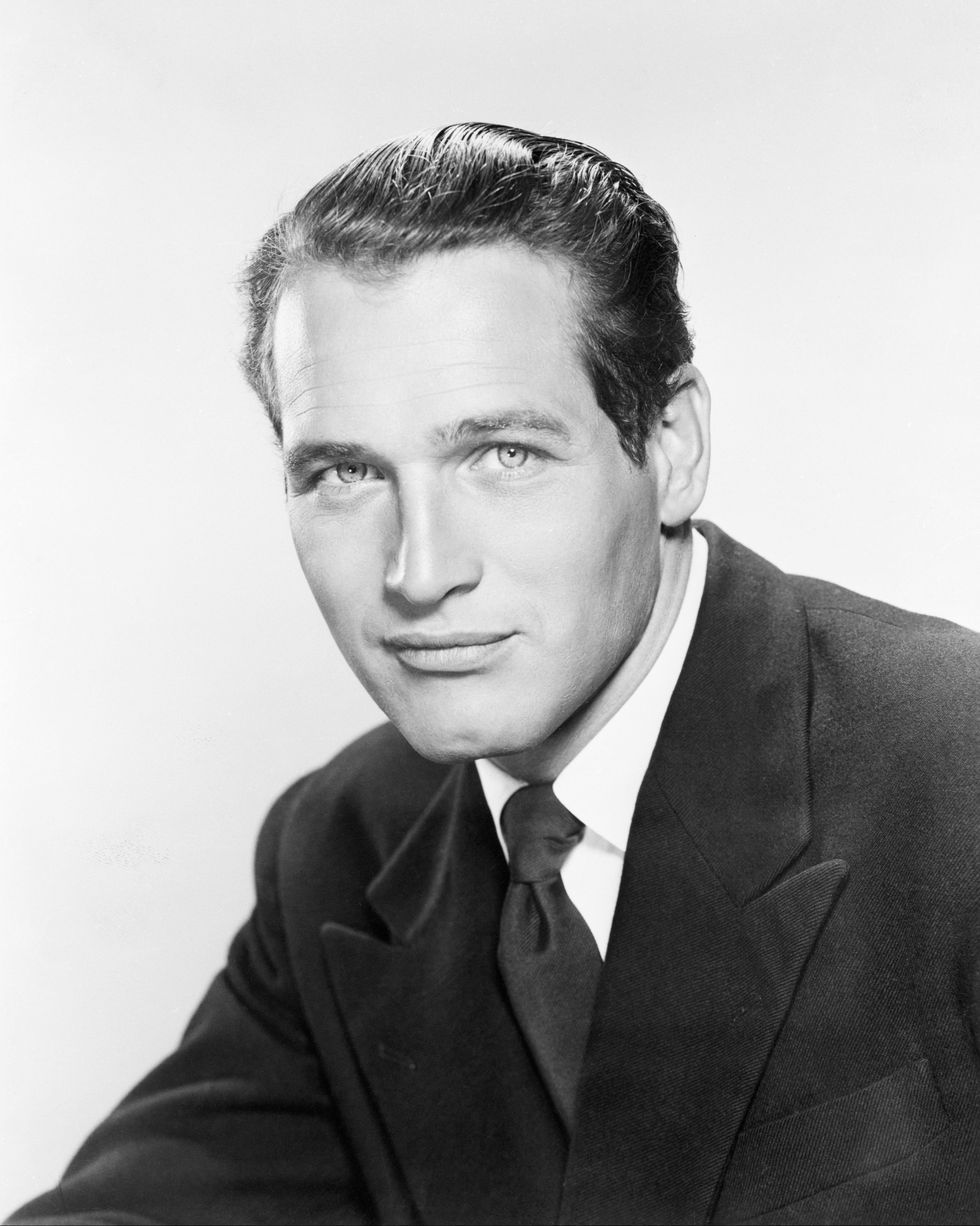
Paul Newman won for The Hustler (1961)

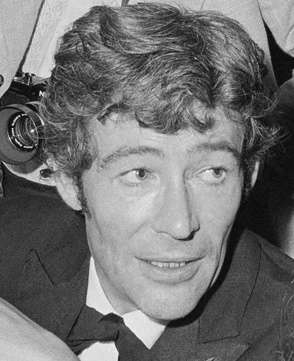
Peter O'Toole won for Lawrence of Arabia (1962)

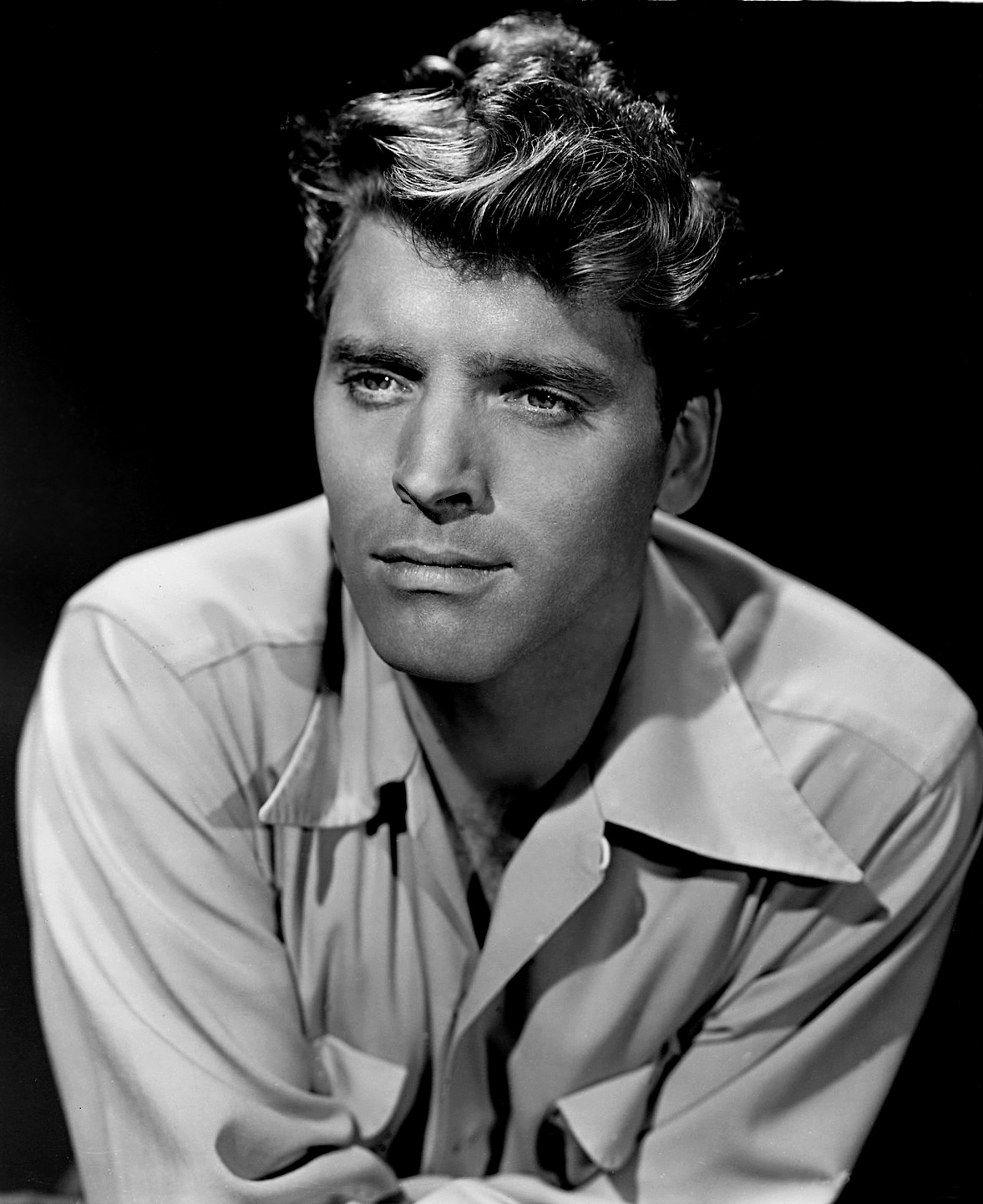
Burt Lancaster won twice for Birdman of Alcatraz (1962) and Atlantic City (1981)

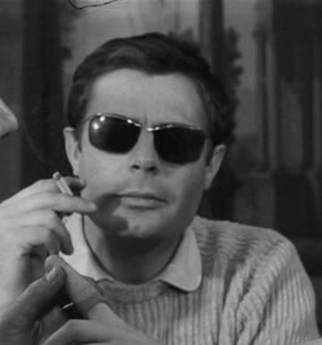
Marcello Mastroianni won twice in Divorce Italian Style (1963), and Yesterday, Today and Tomorrow (1964)

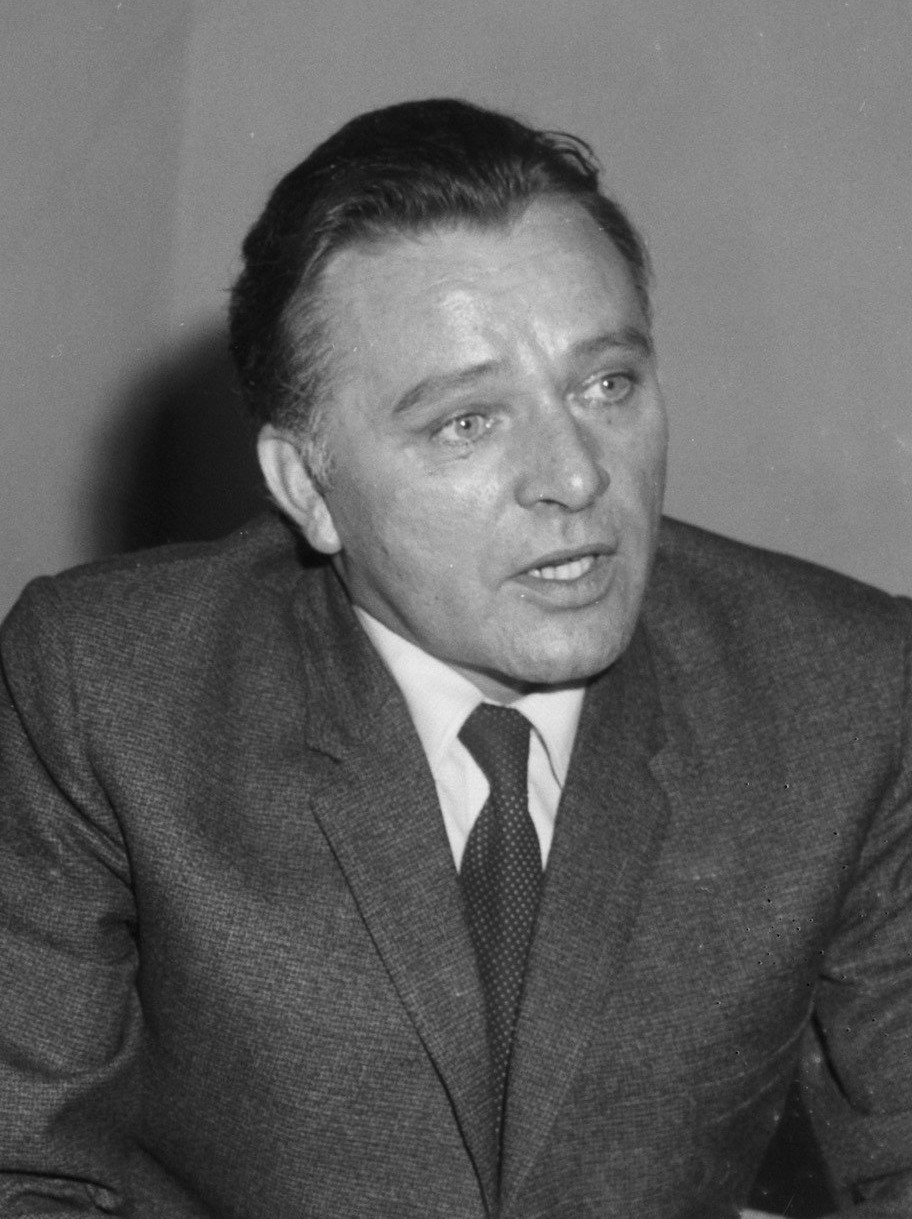
Richard Burton won for The Spy Who Came in from the Cold / Who's Afraid of Virginia Woolf? (1966)

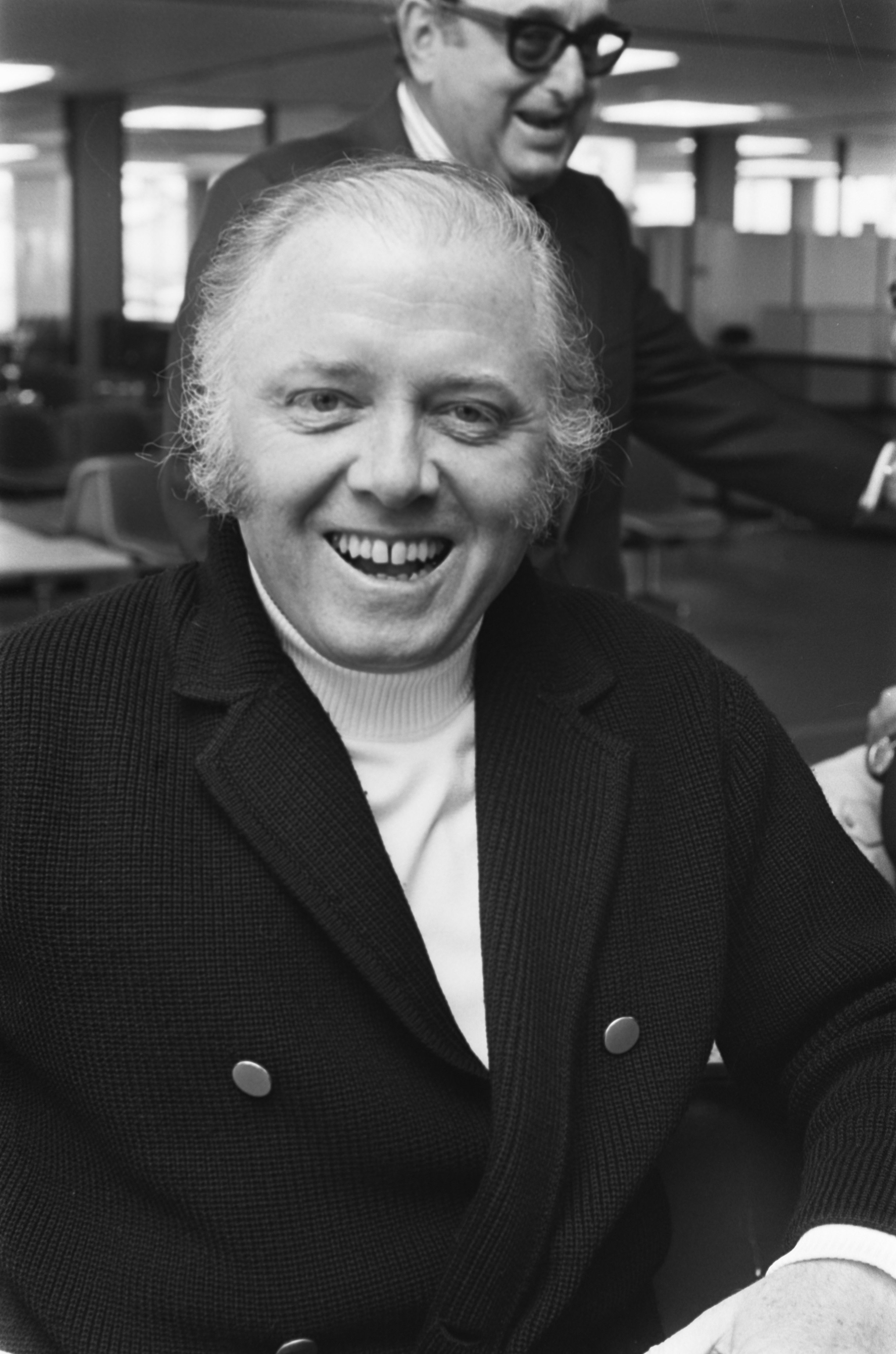
Richard Attenborough won for Guns at Batasi / Seance on a Wet Afternoon (1968)

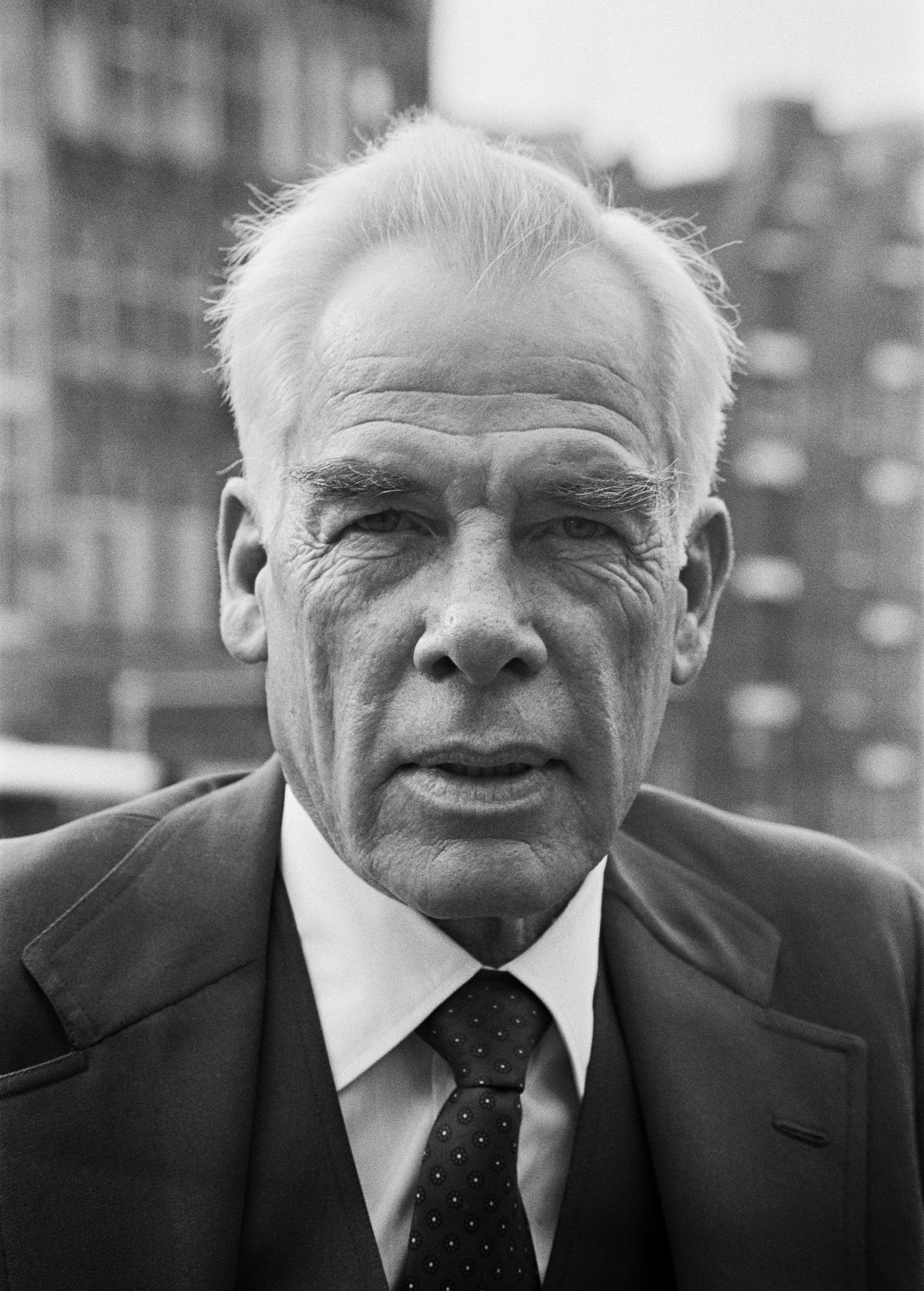
Lee Marvin won for The Killers / Cat Ballou (1965)

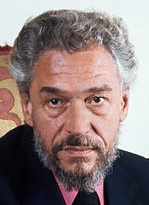
Paul Scofield won for A Man for All Seasons (1966)

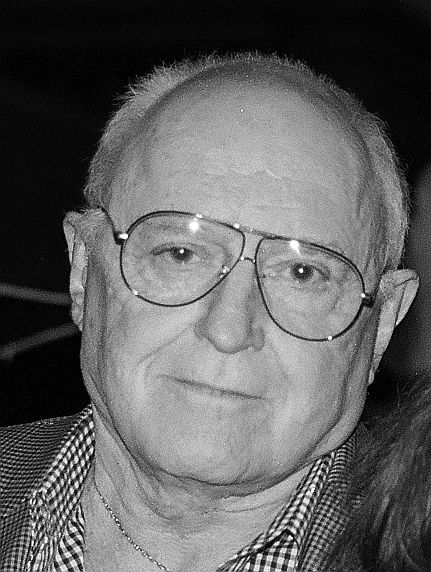
Rod Steiger won twice for The Pawnbroker (1966) and In the Heat of the Night (1967)

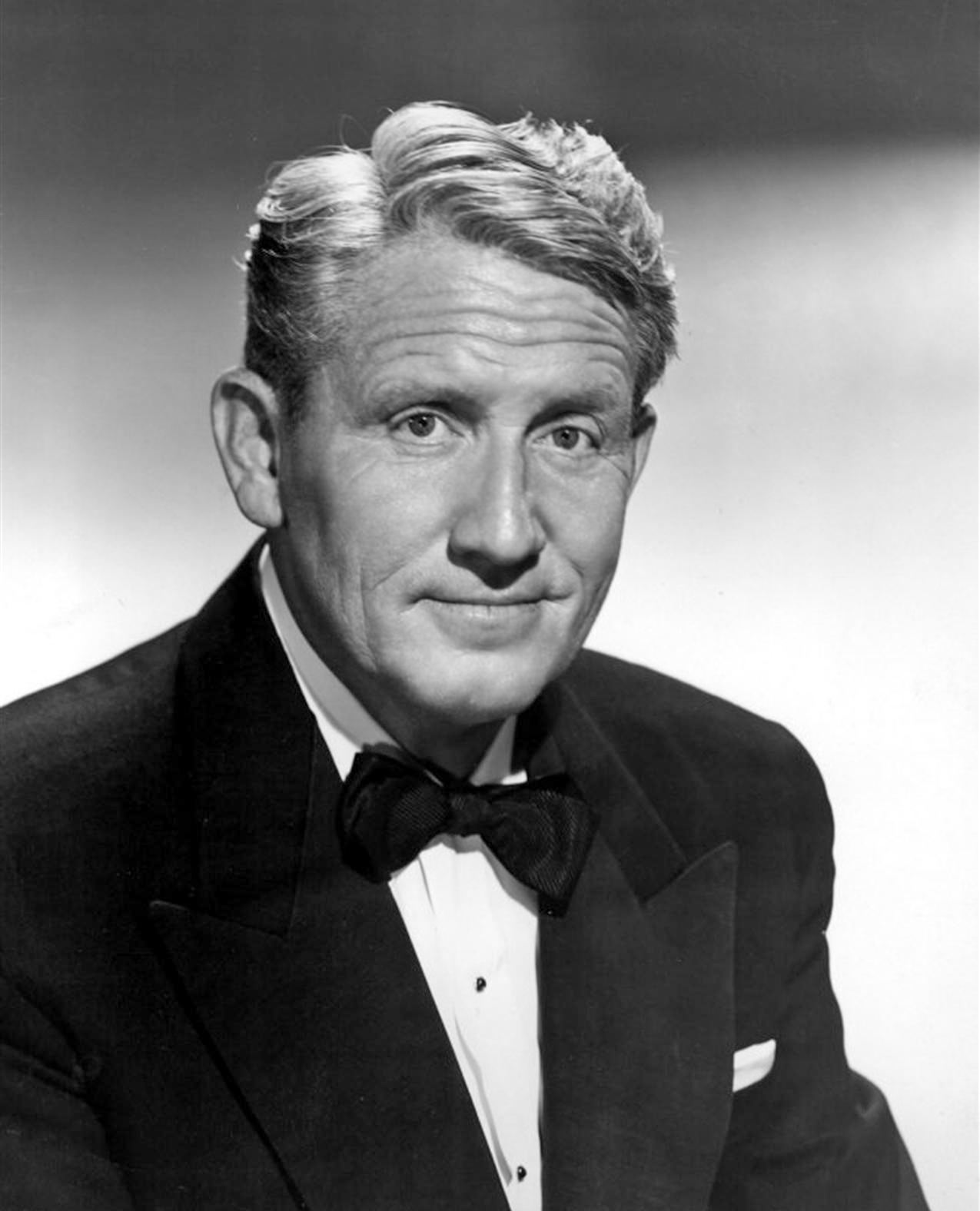
Spencer Tracy won for Guess Who's Coming to Dinner? (1968)

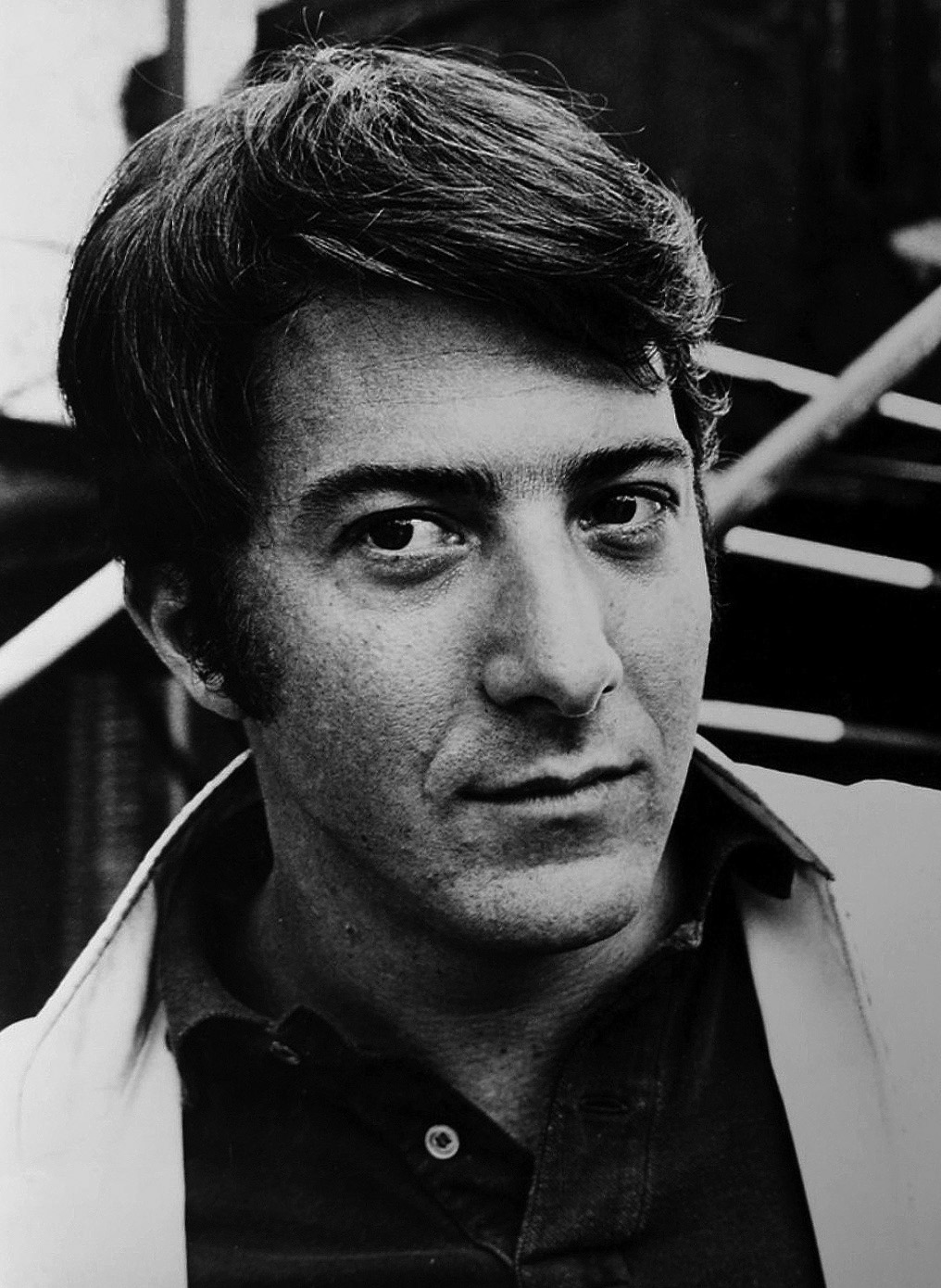
Dustin Hoffman won twice for Midnight Cowboy / John and Mary (1969), and Tootsie (1983)

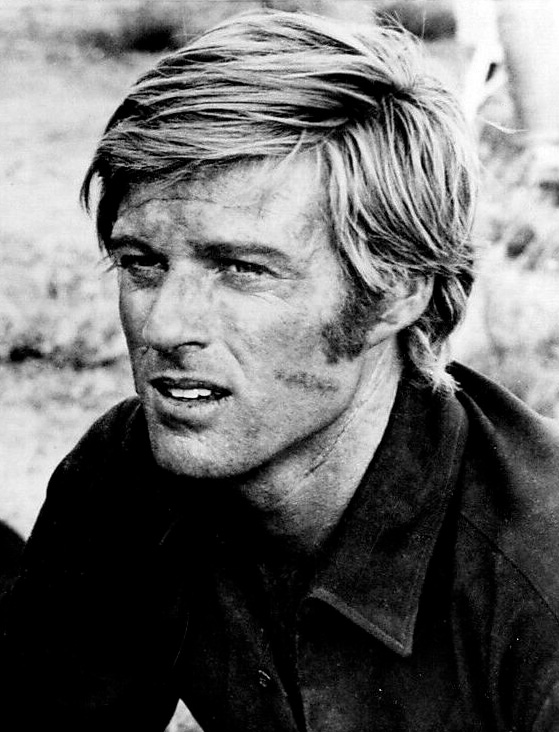
Robert Redford won for three films in 1970

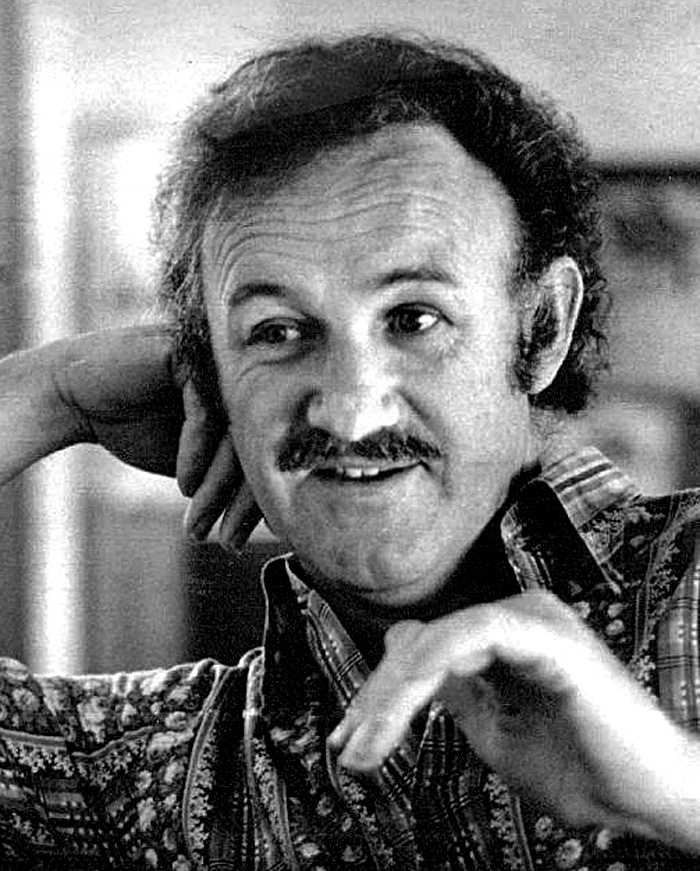
Gene Hackman won for The French Connection and The Poseidon Adventure (1972)

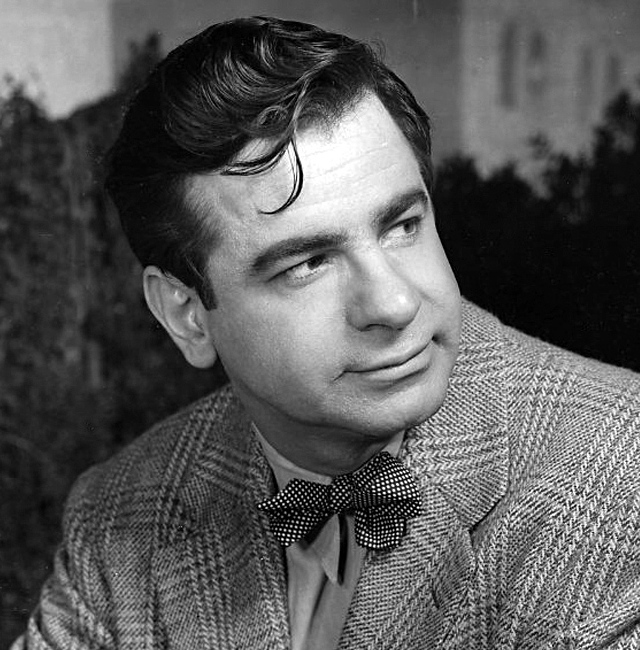
Walter Matthau won for Charley Varrick / Pete 'n' Tillie (1973)

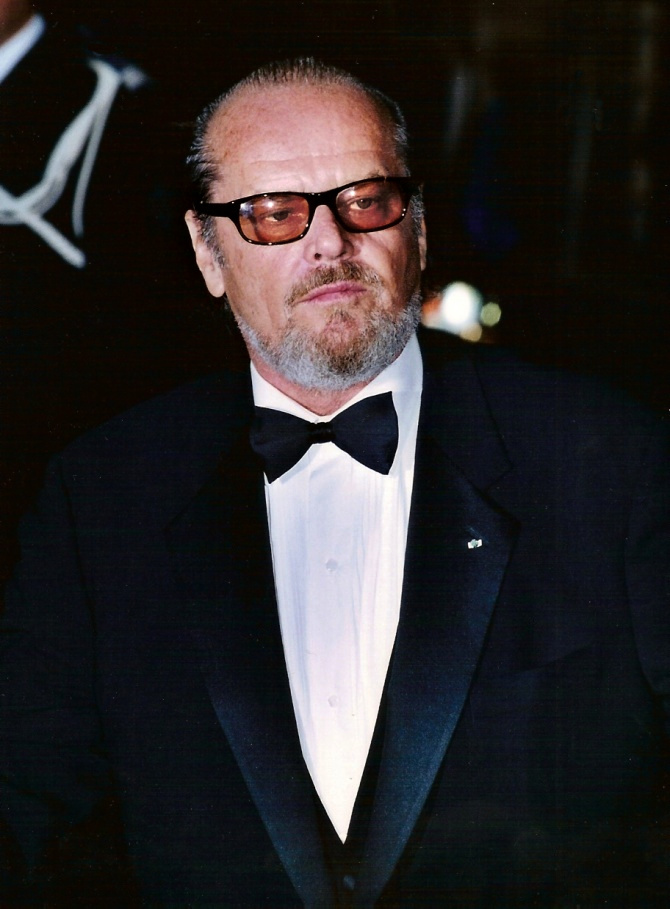
Jack Nicholson won twice for The Last Detail / Chinatown (1974), and One Flew Over the Cuckoo's Nest (1975)

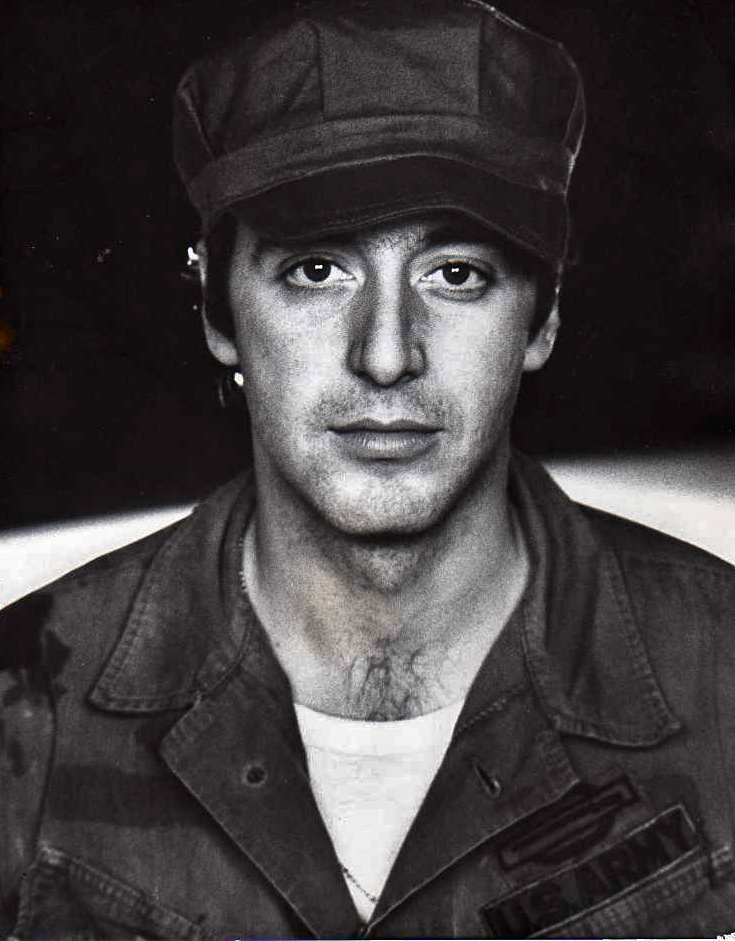
Al Pacino won for The Godfather Part II / Dog Day Afternoon (1975)

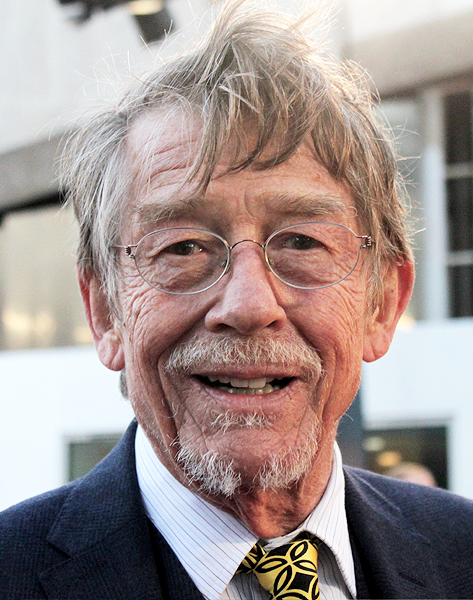
John Hurt won for The Elephant Man (1980)

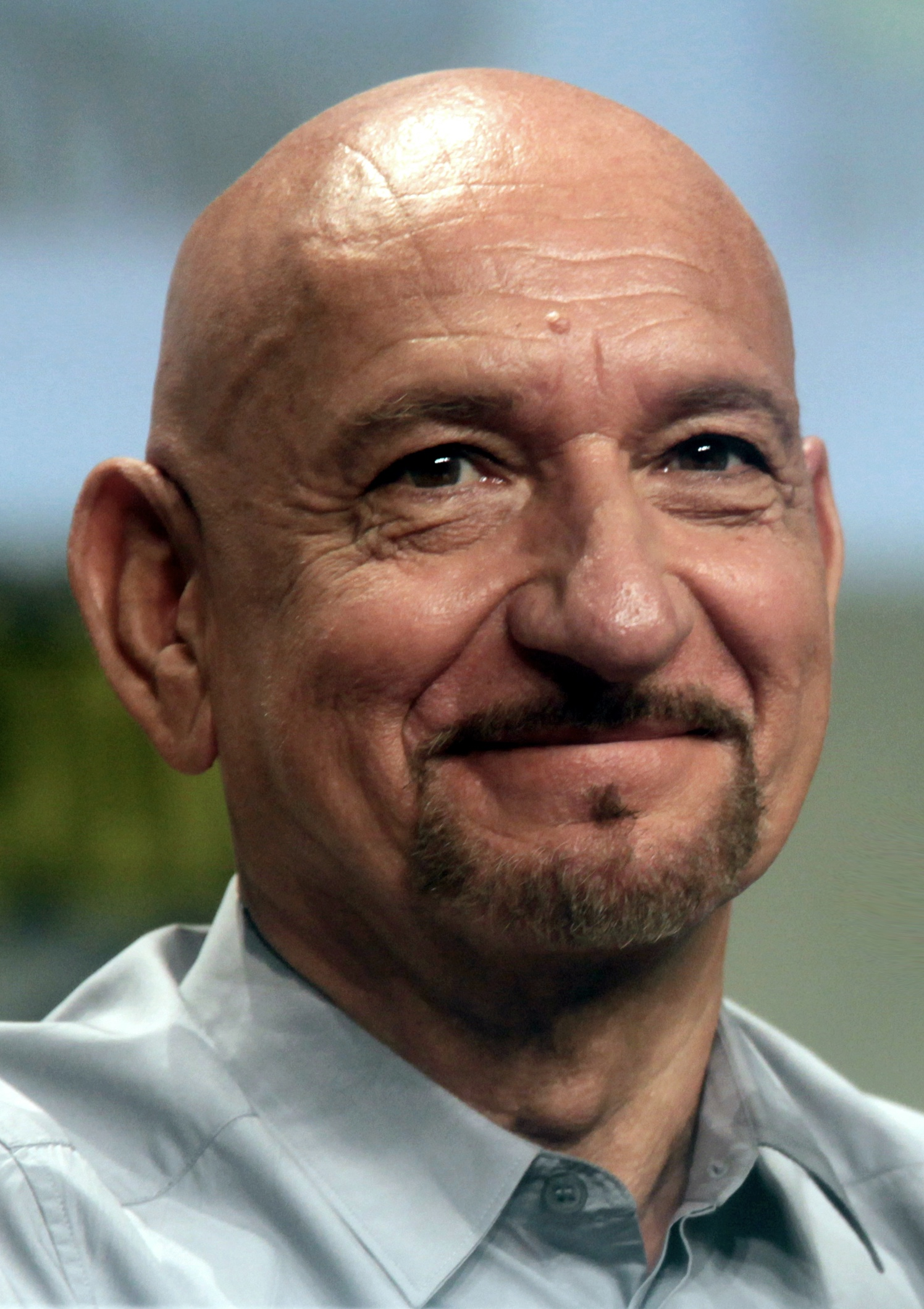
Ben Kingsley won for Gandhi (1982)

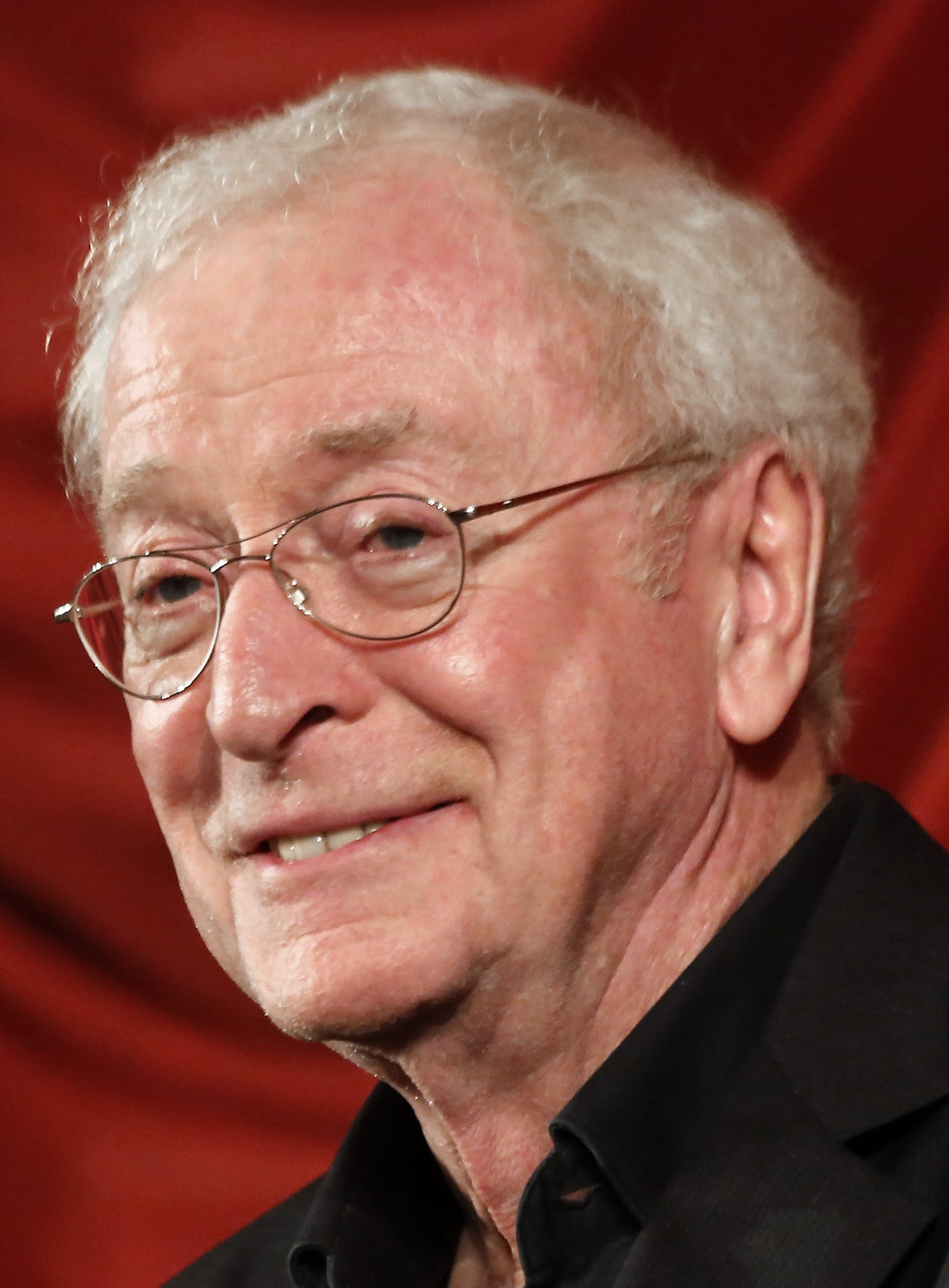
Michael Caine won for Educating Rita (1983)

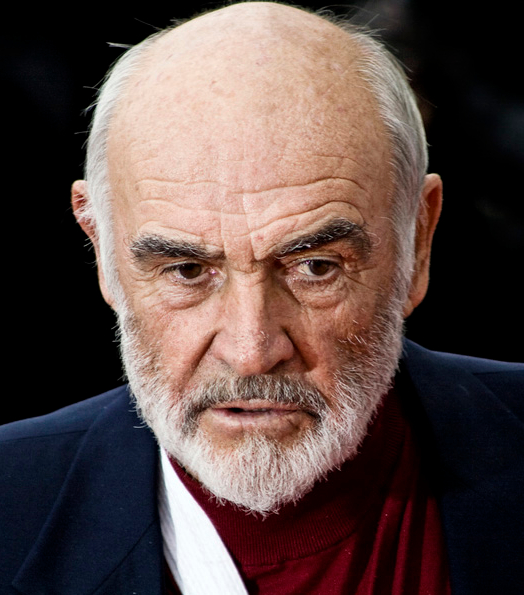
Sean Connery won for The Name of the Rose (1987)

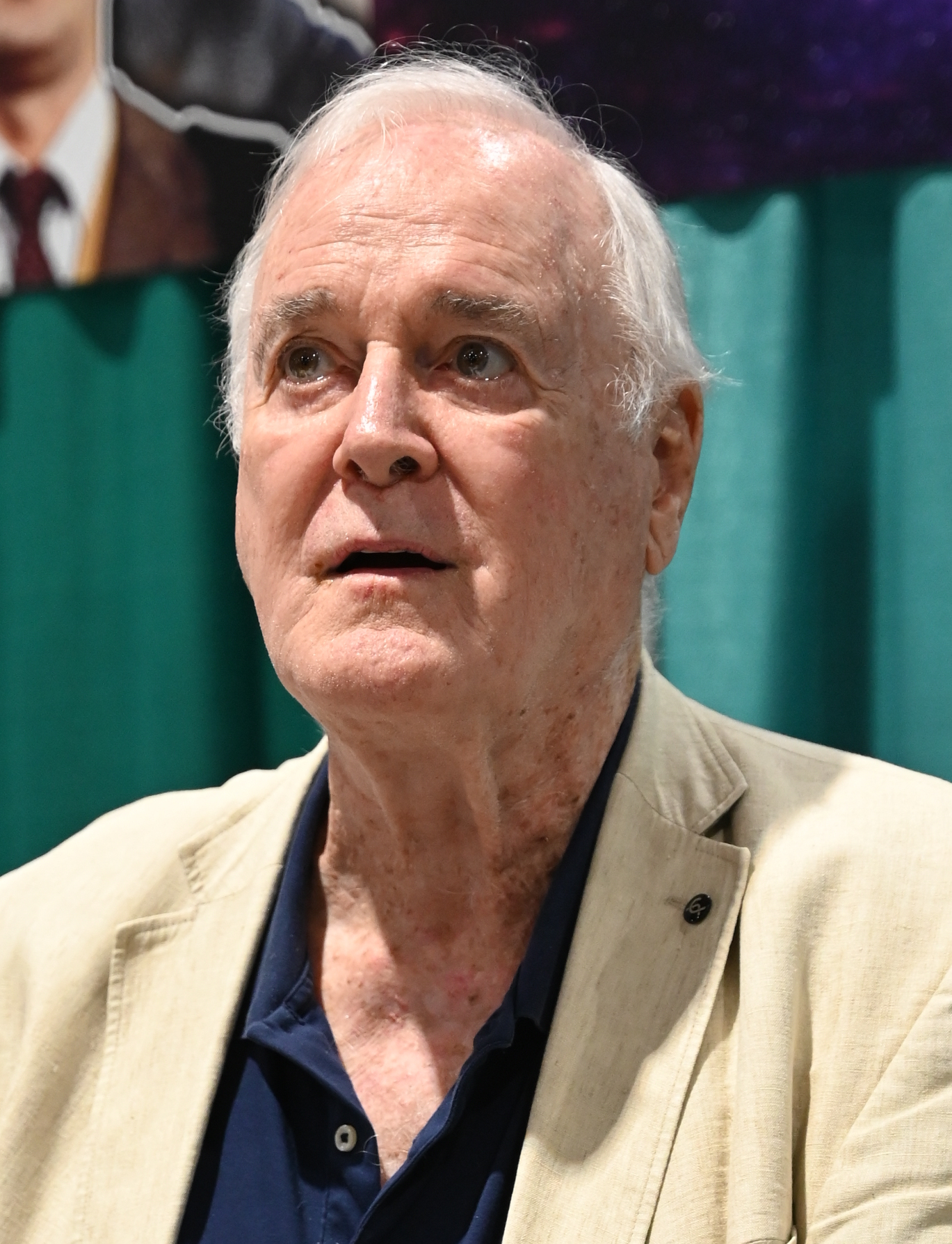
John Cleese won for A Fish Called Wanda (1988)

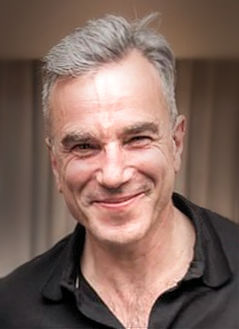
Daniel Day-Lewis won four times for My Left Foot (1989), Gangs of New York (2002), There Will Be Blood (2007) and Lincoln (2012)

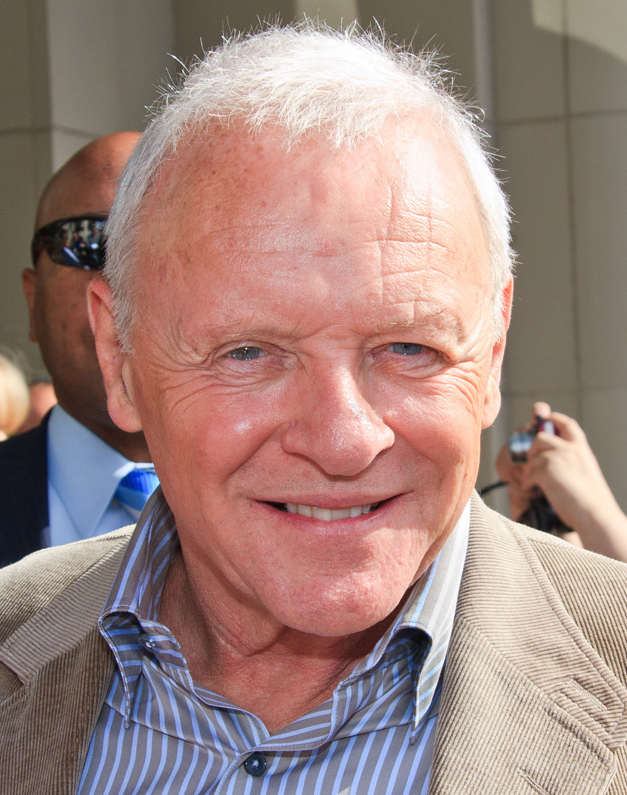
Anthony Hopkins won thrice for The Silence of the Lambs (1991), The Remains of the Day (1993) and The Father (2020)

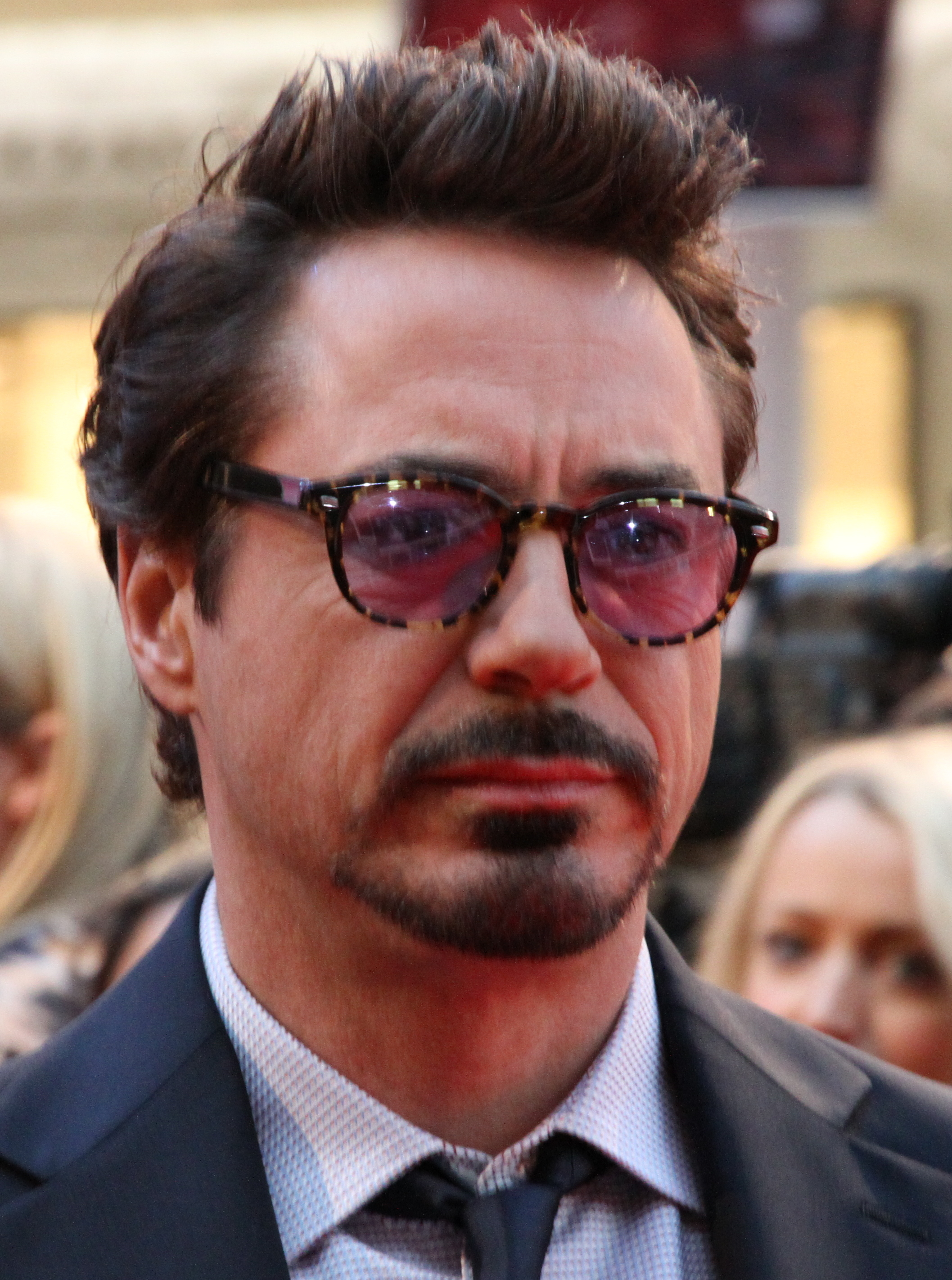
Robert Downey Jr. won for Chaplin (1992)

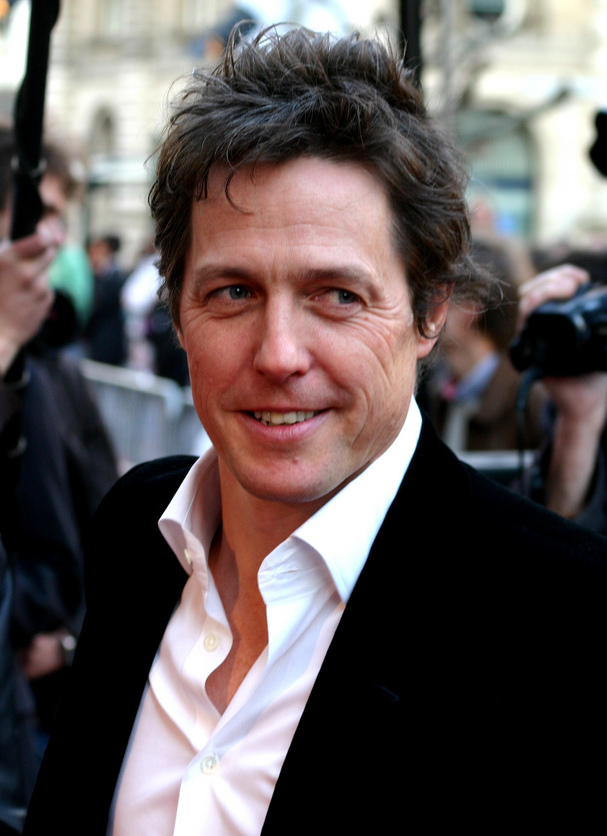
Hugh Grant won for Four Weddings and a Funeral (1994)

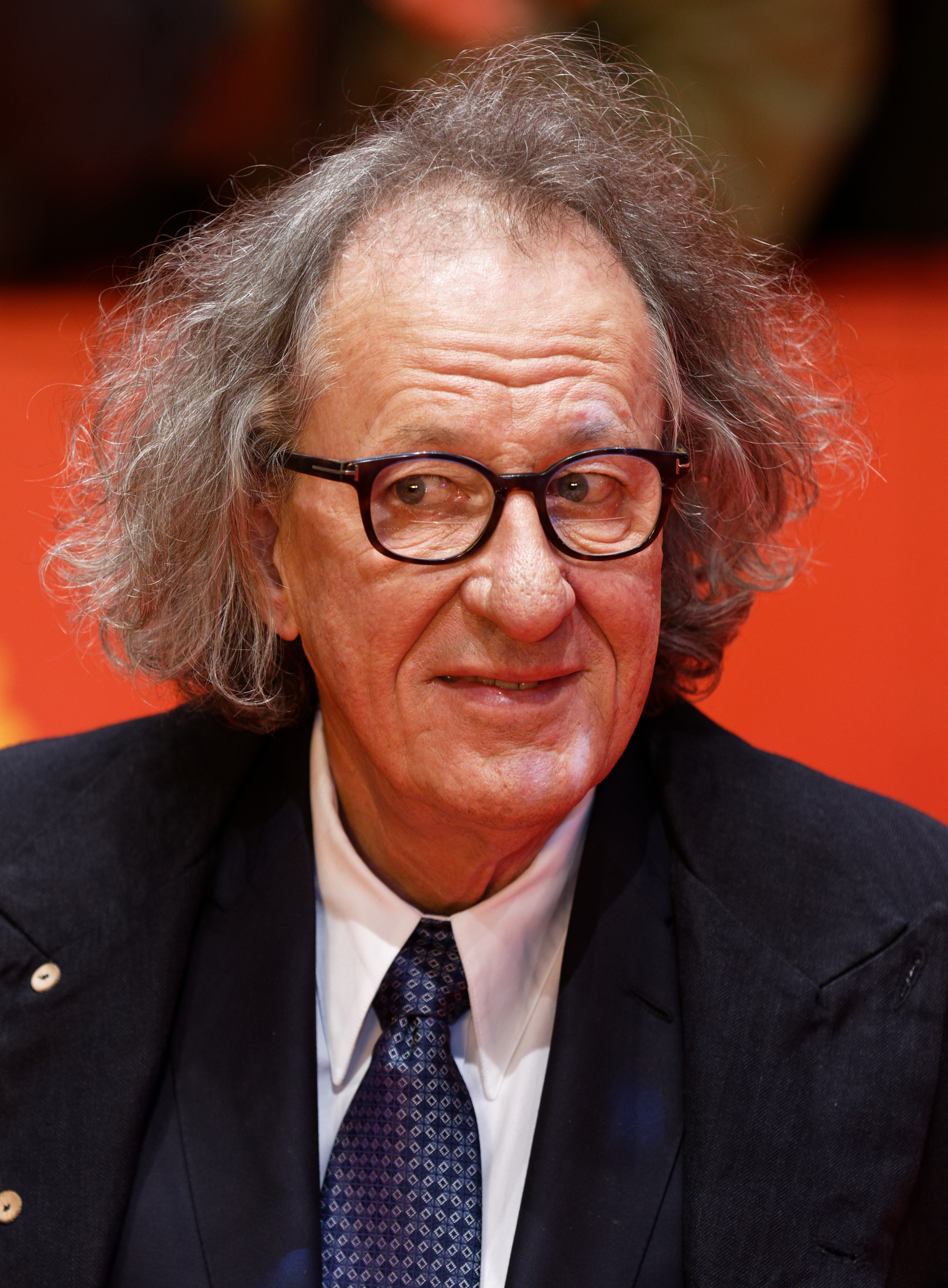
Geoffrey Rush won for Shine (1996)

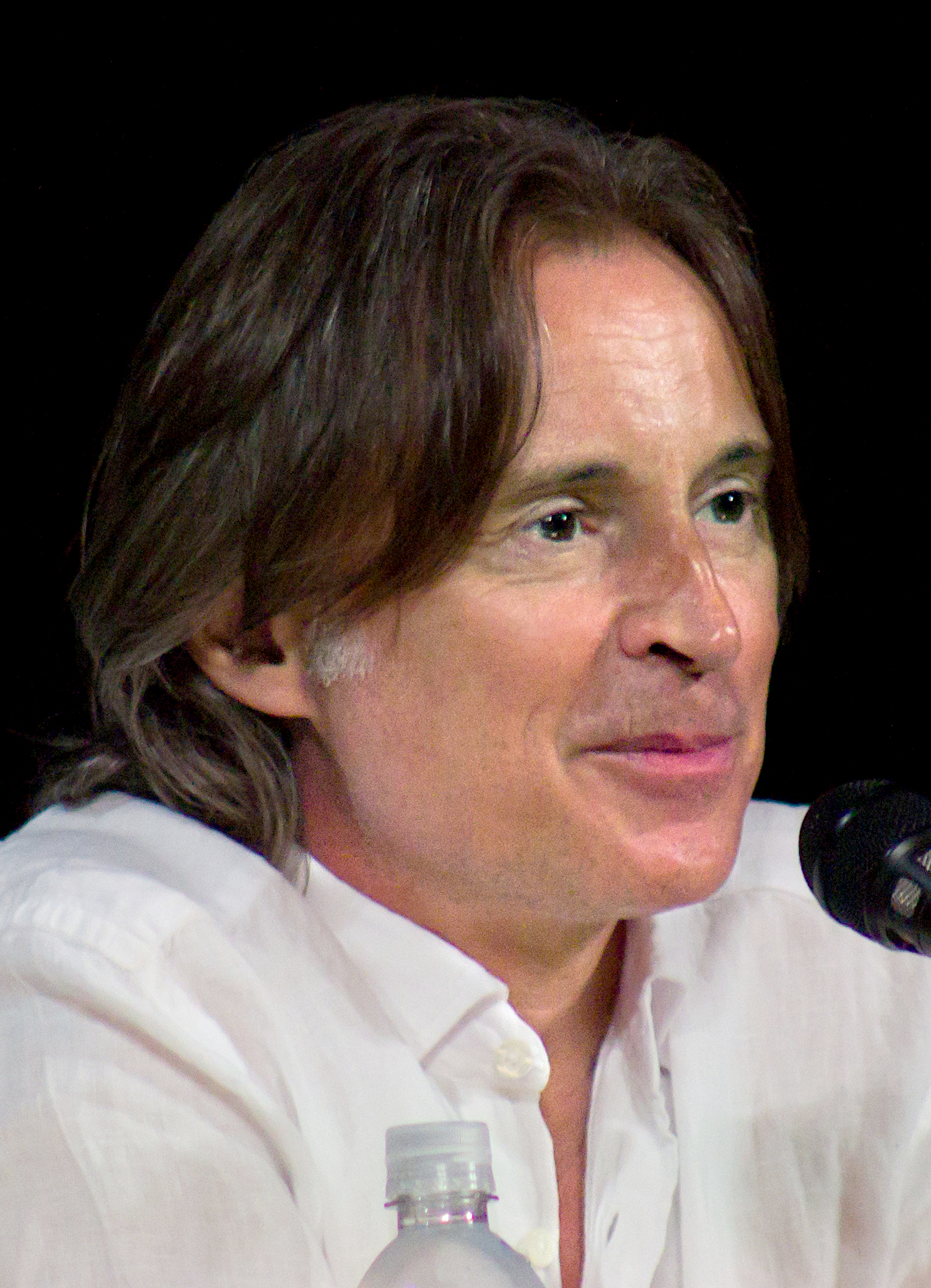
Robert Carlyle won for The Full Monty (1997)

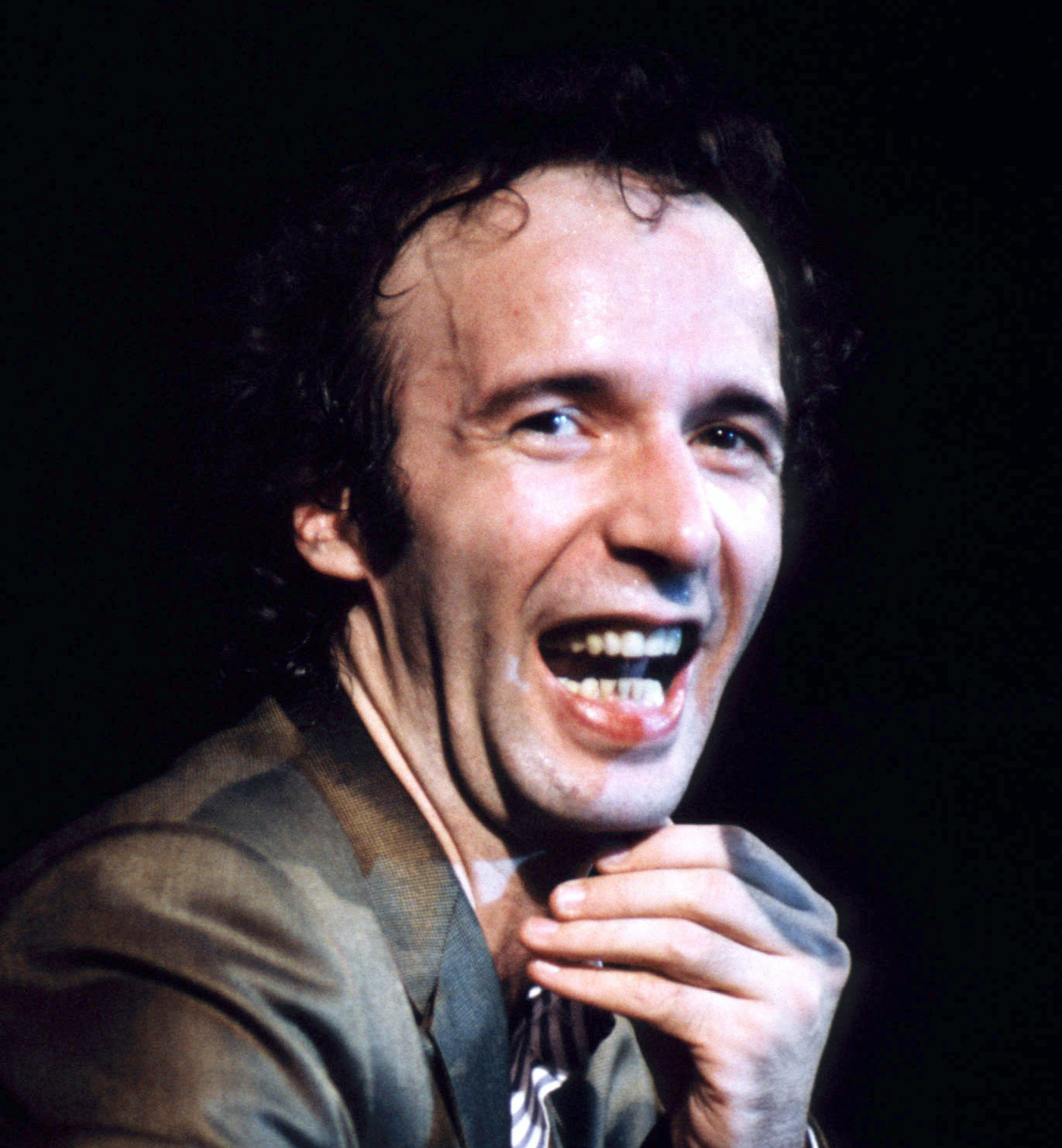
Roberto Benigni won for Life Is Beautiful (1998)

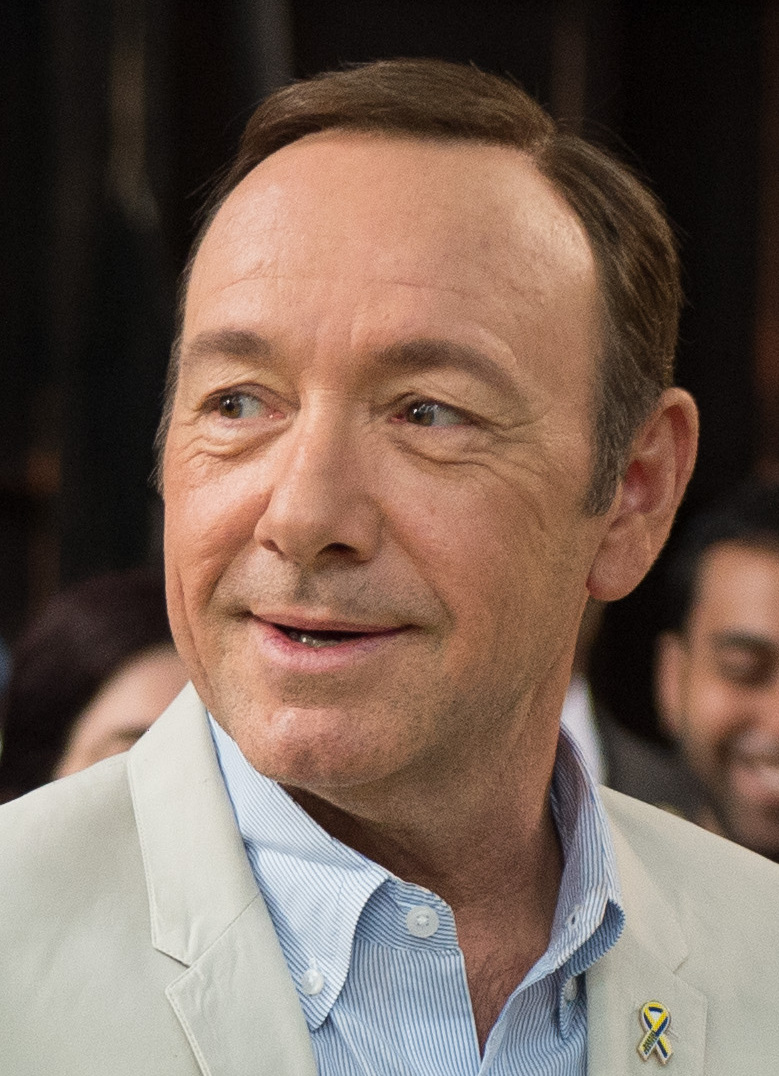
Kevin Spacey won for American Beauty (1999)

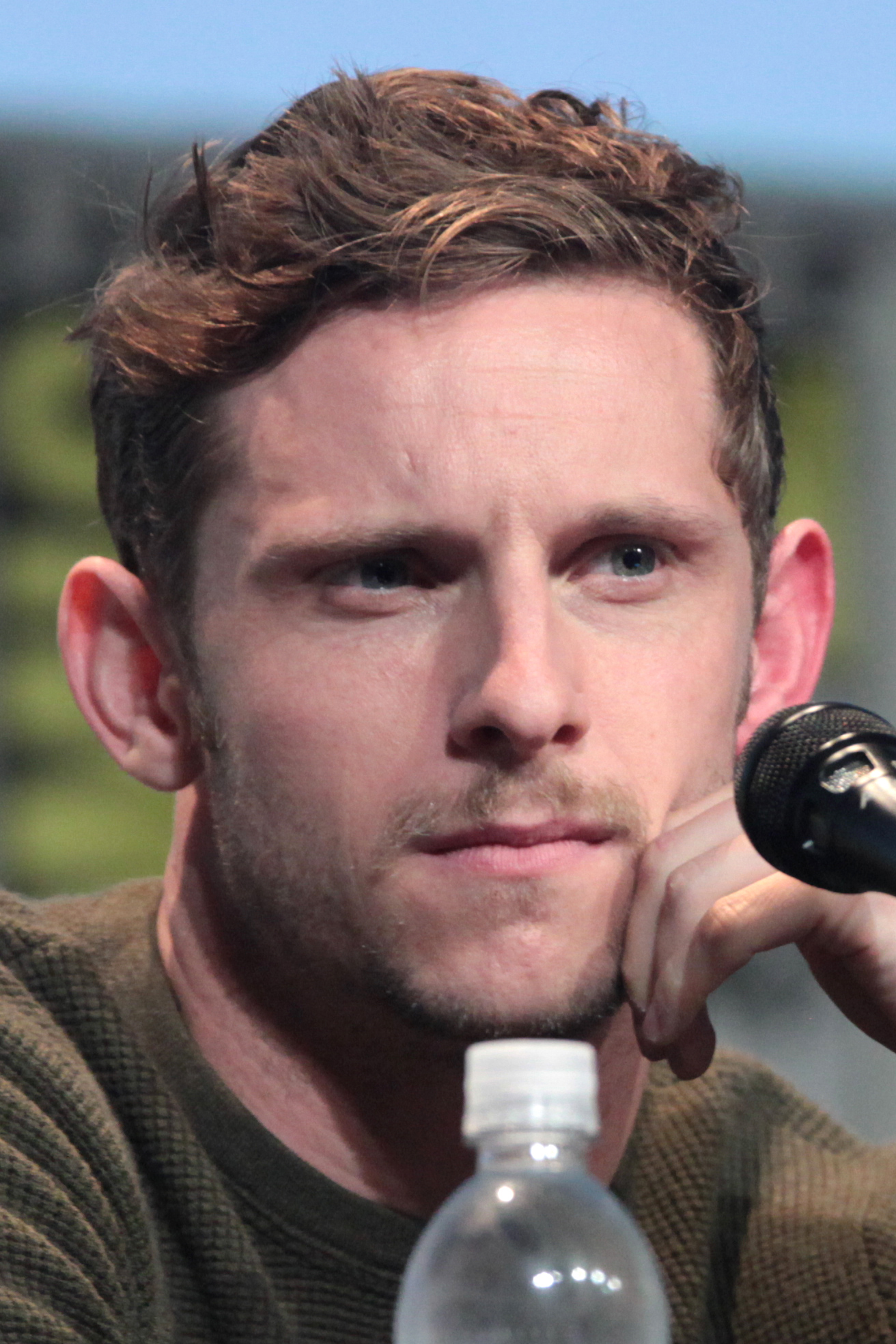
Jamie Bell won for Billy Elliot (2000)

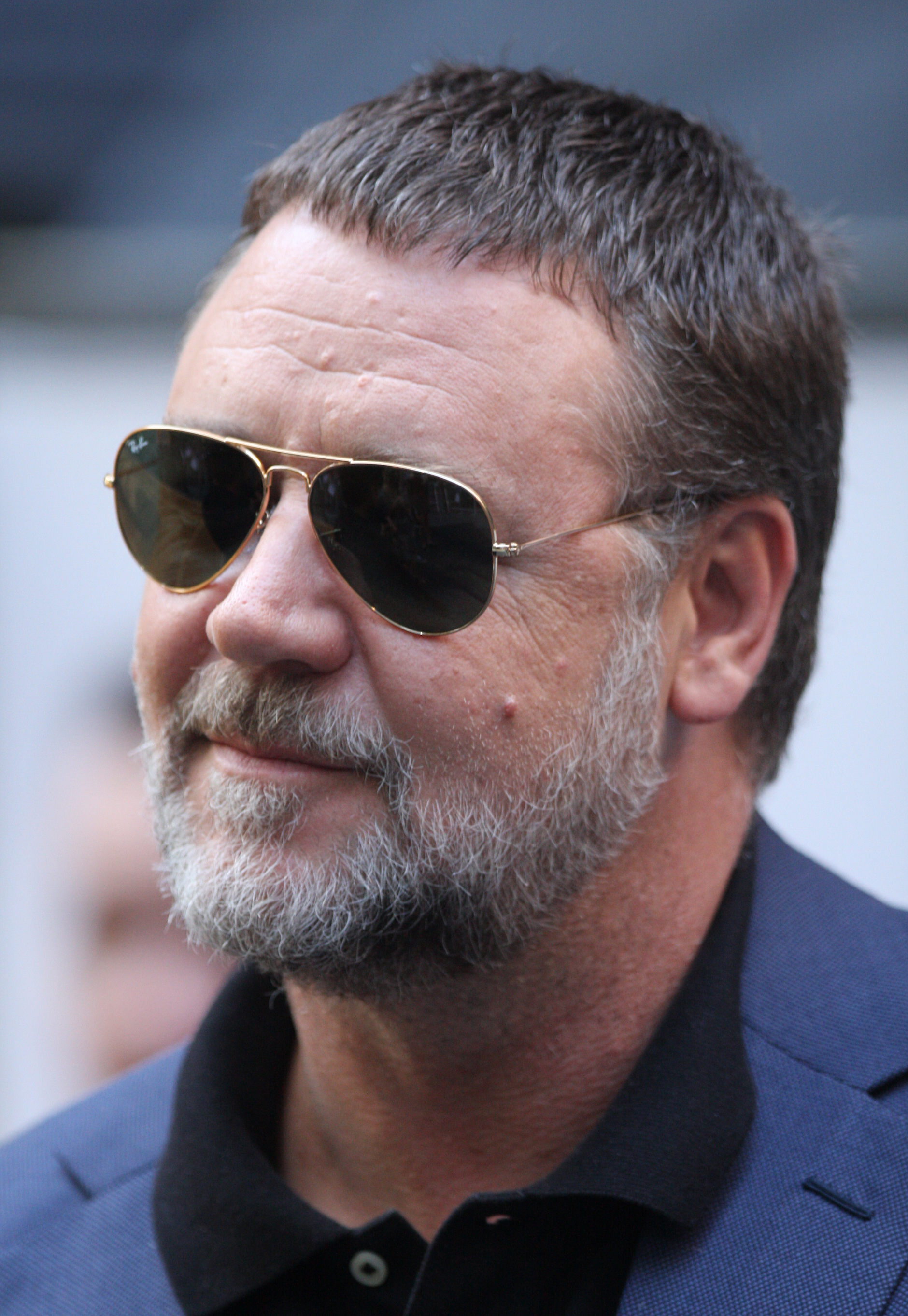
Russell Crowe won for A Beautiful Mind (2001)

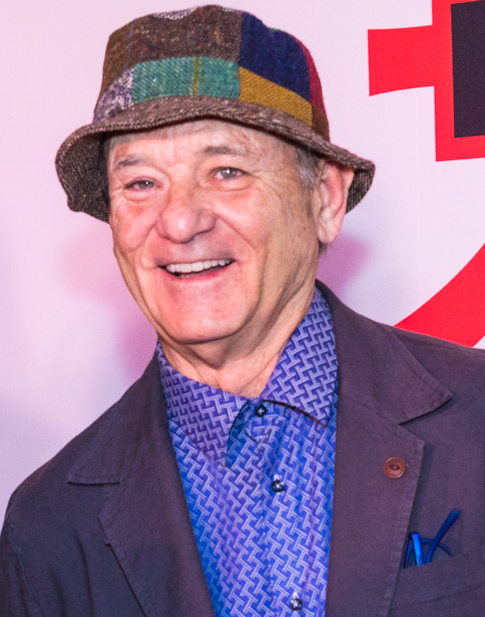
Bill Murray won for Lost in Translation (2003)

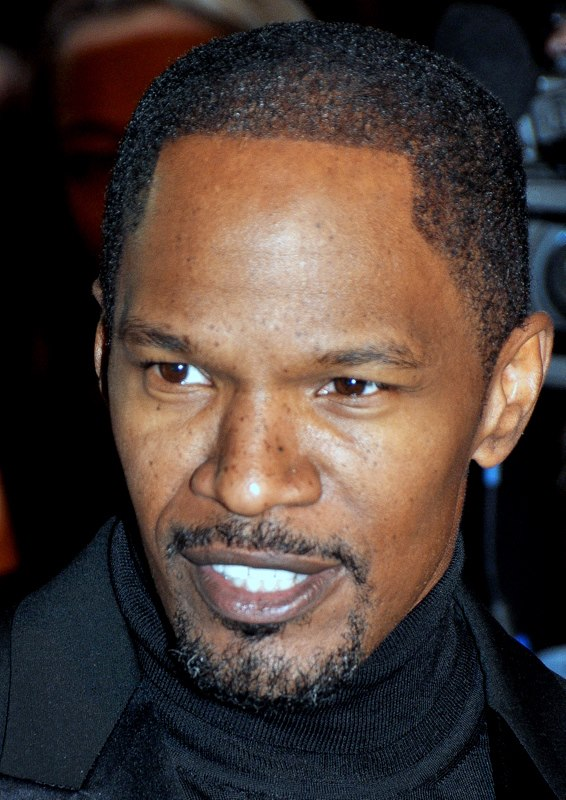
Jamie Foxx won for Ray (2004)

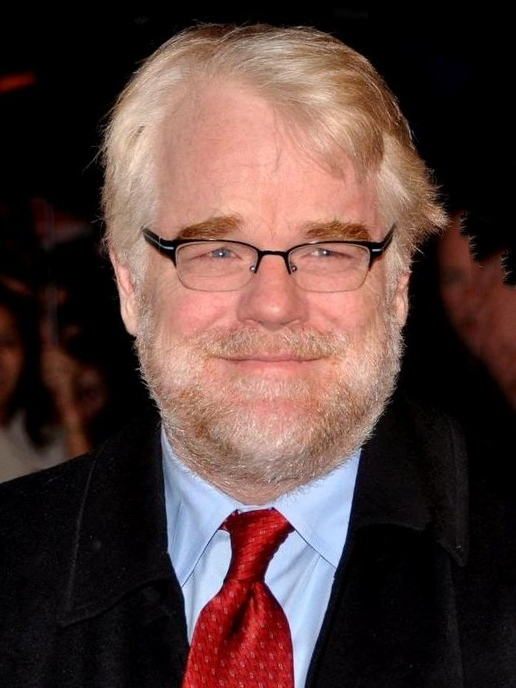
Philip Seymour Hoffman won for Capote (2005)

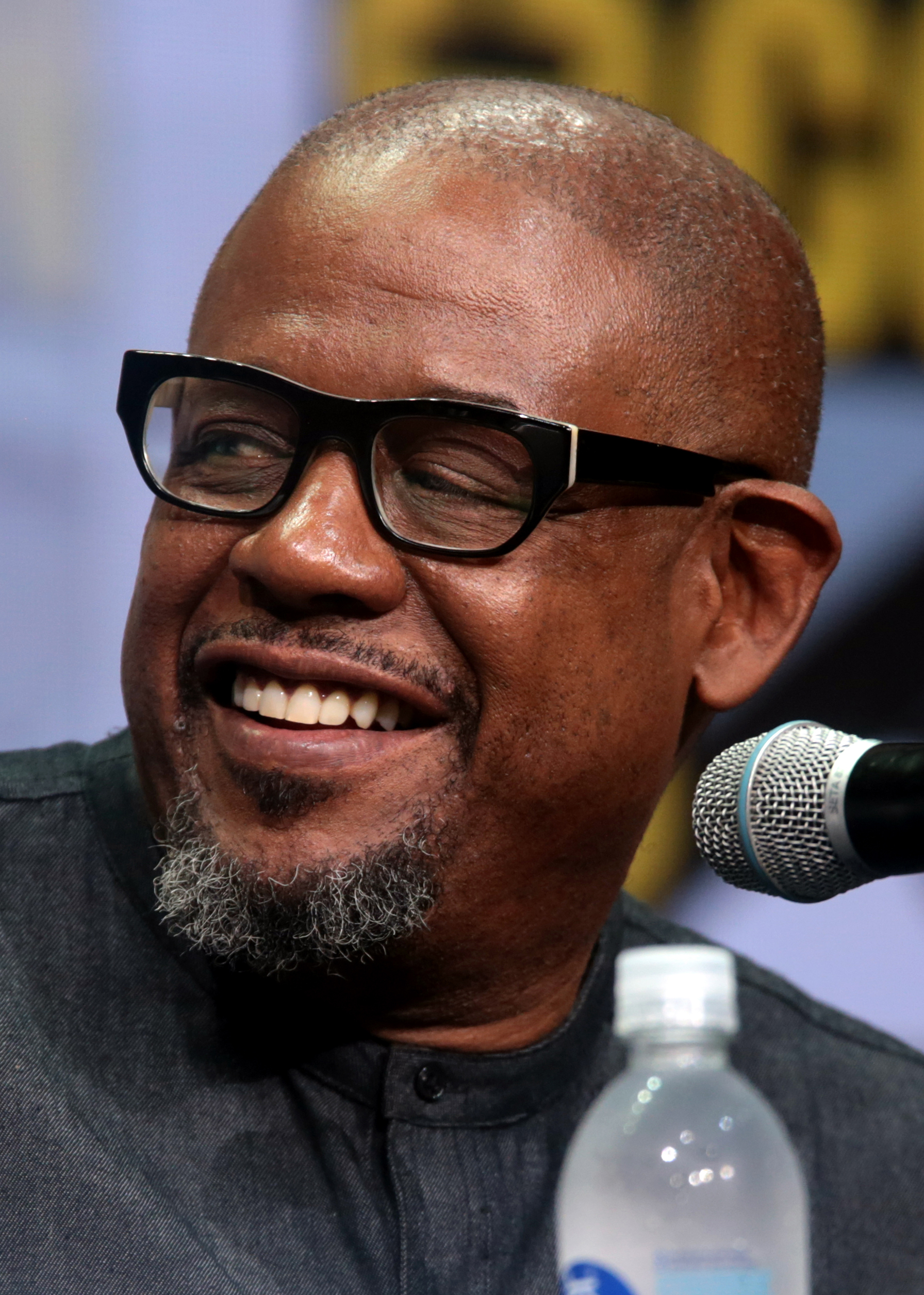
Forest Whitaker won for The Last King of Scotland (2006)

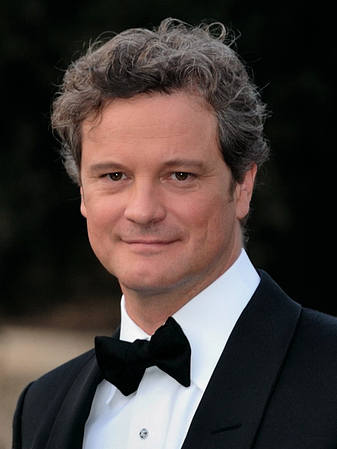
Colin Firth won twice for A Single Man (2009) and The King's Speech (2010)

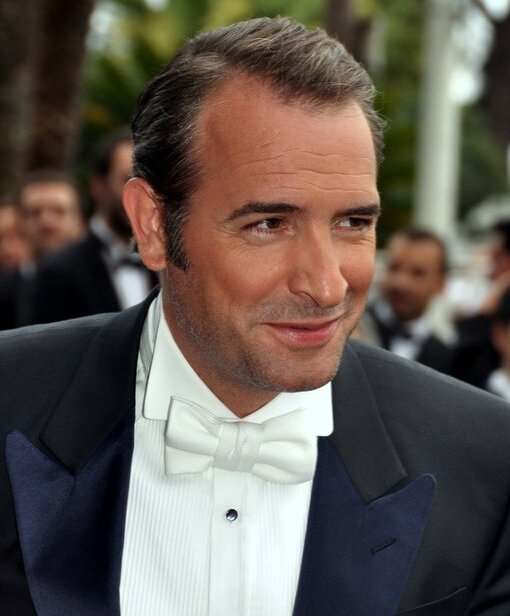
Jean Dujardin won for The Artist (2011)

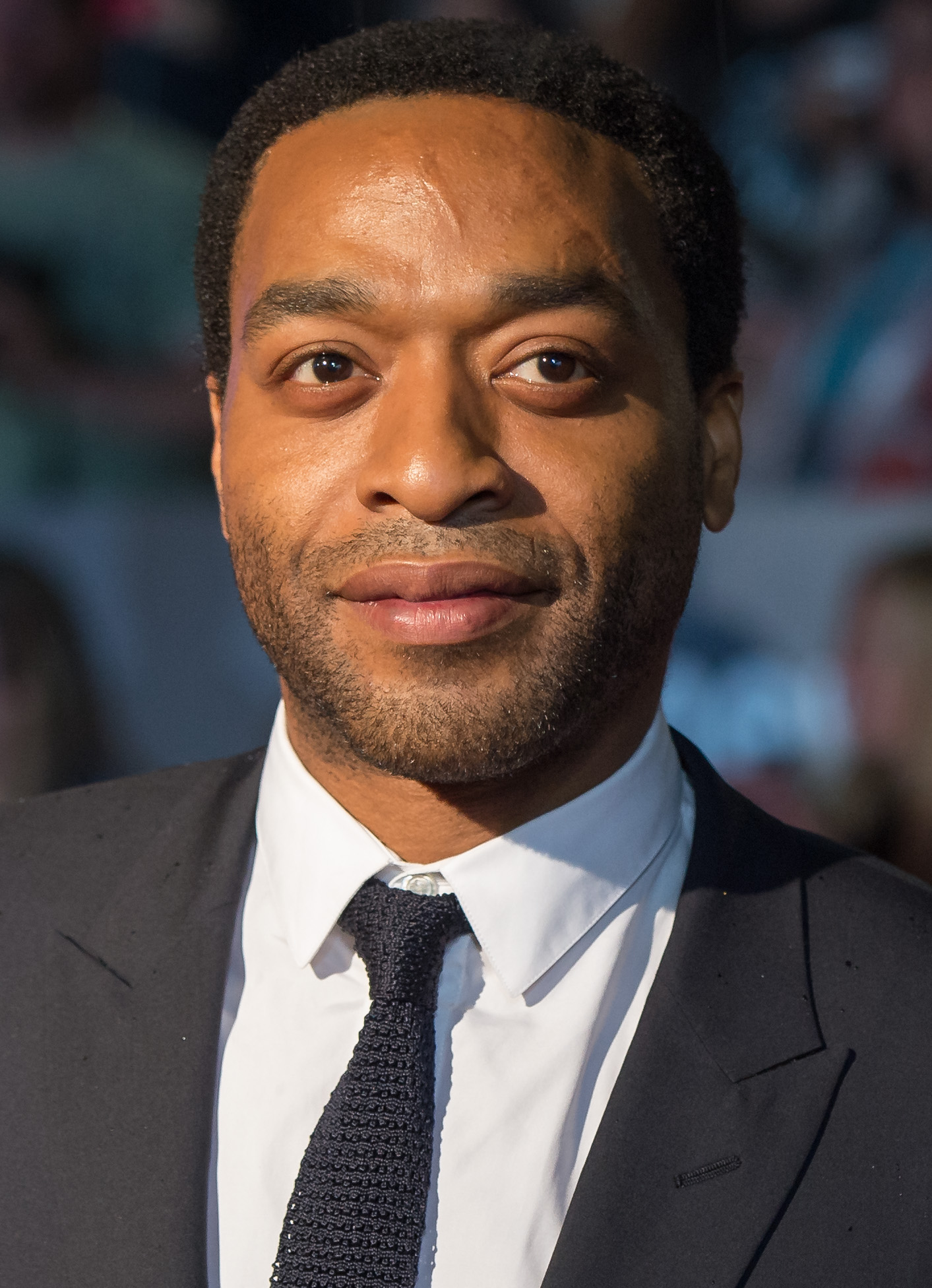
Chiwetel Ejiofor won for 12 Years a Slave (2013)

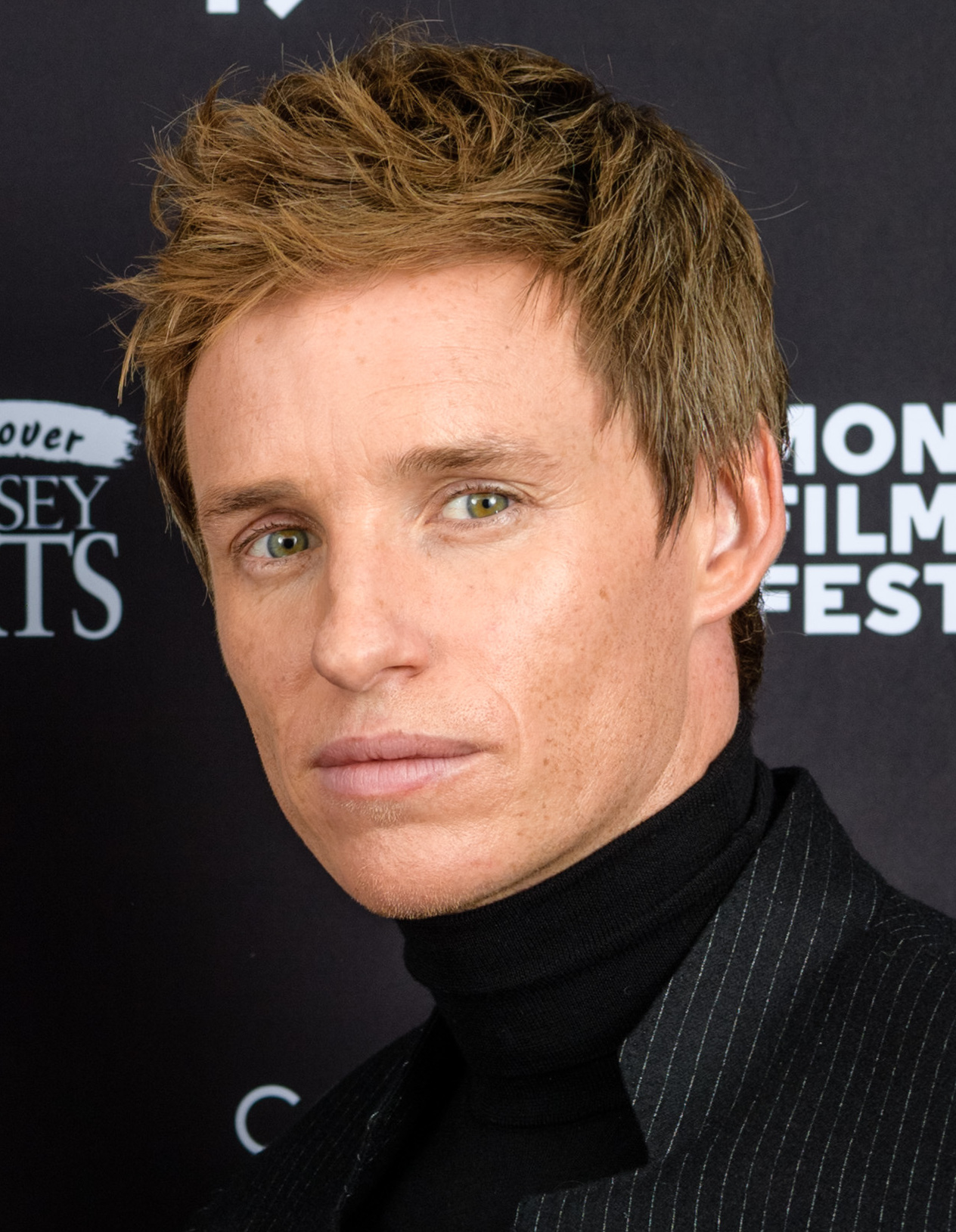
Eddie Redmayne won for The Theory of Everything (2014)

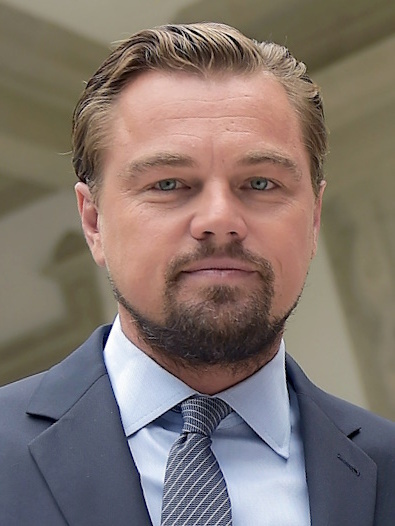
Leonardo DiCaprio won for The Revenant (2015)

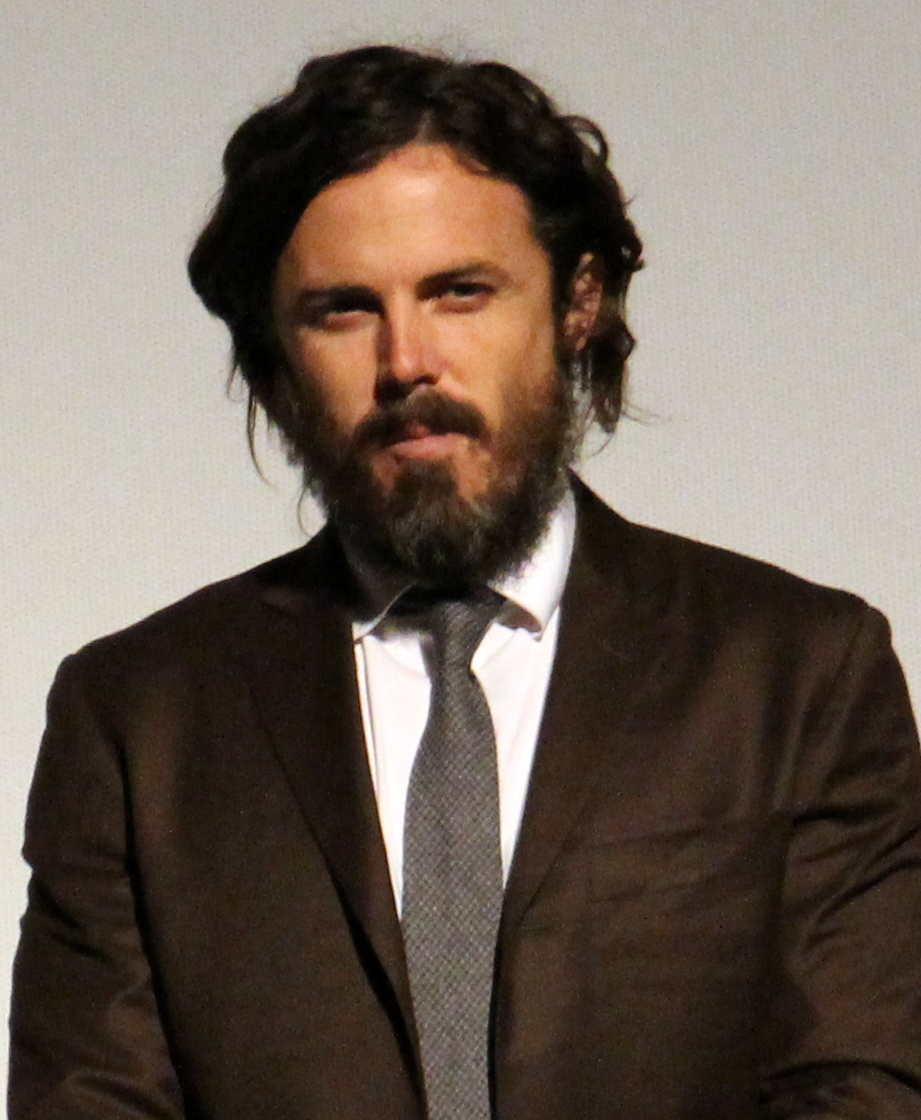
Casey Affleck won for Manchester by the Sea (2016)

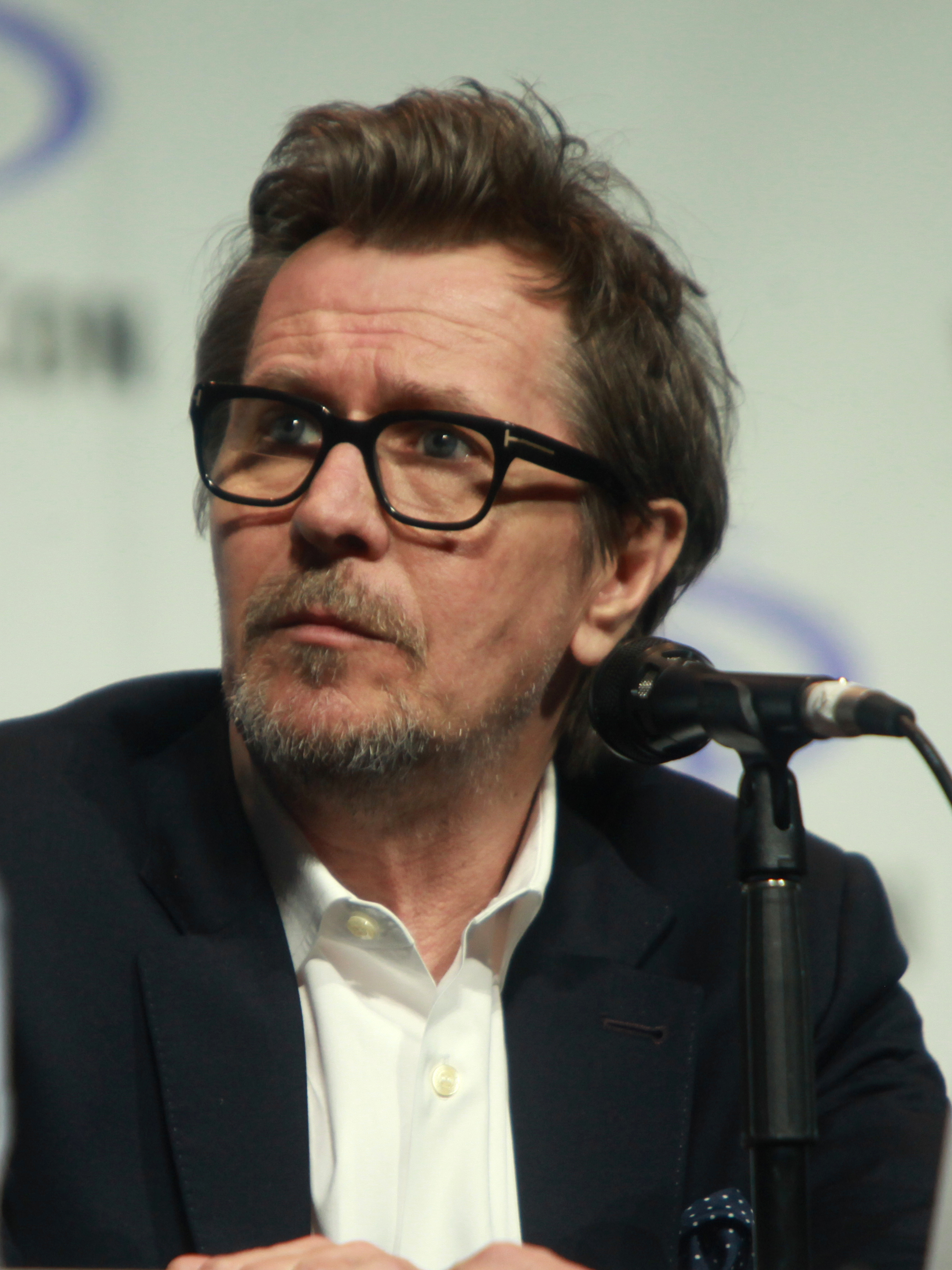
Gary Oldman won for Darkest Hour (2017)

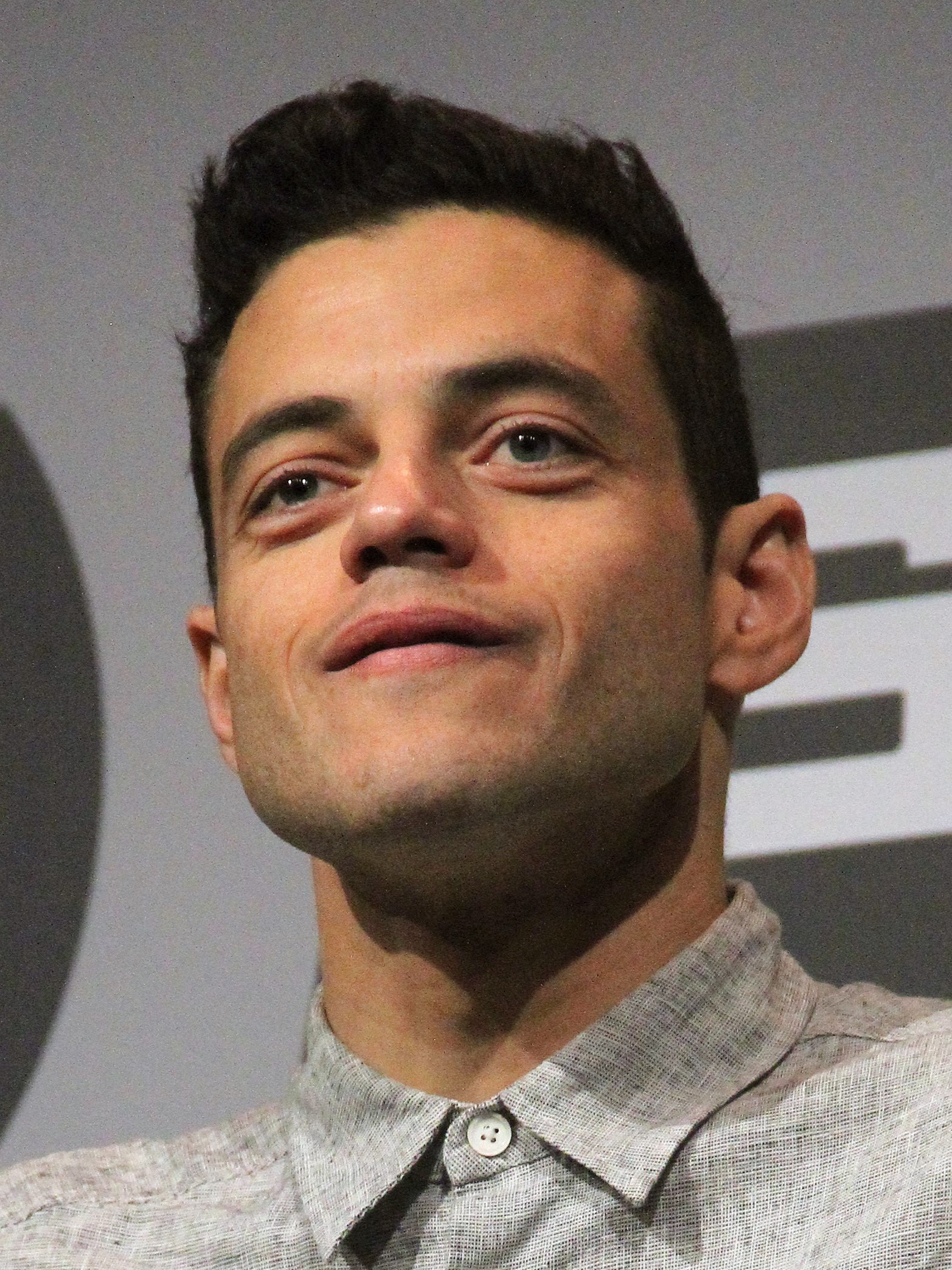
Rami Malek won for Bohemian Rhapsody (2018)

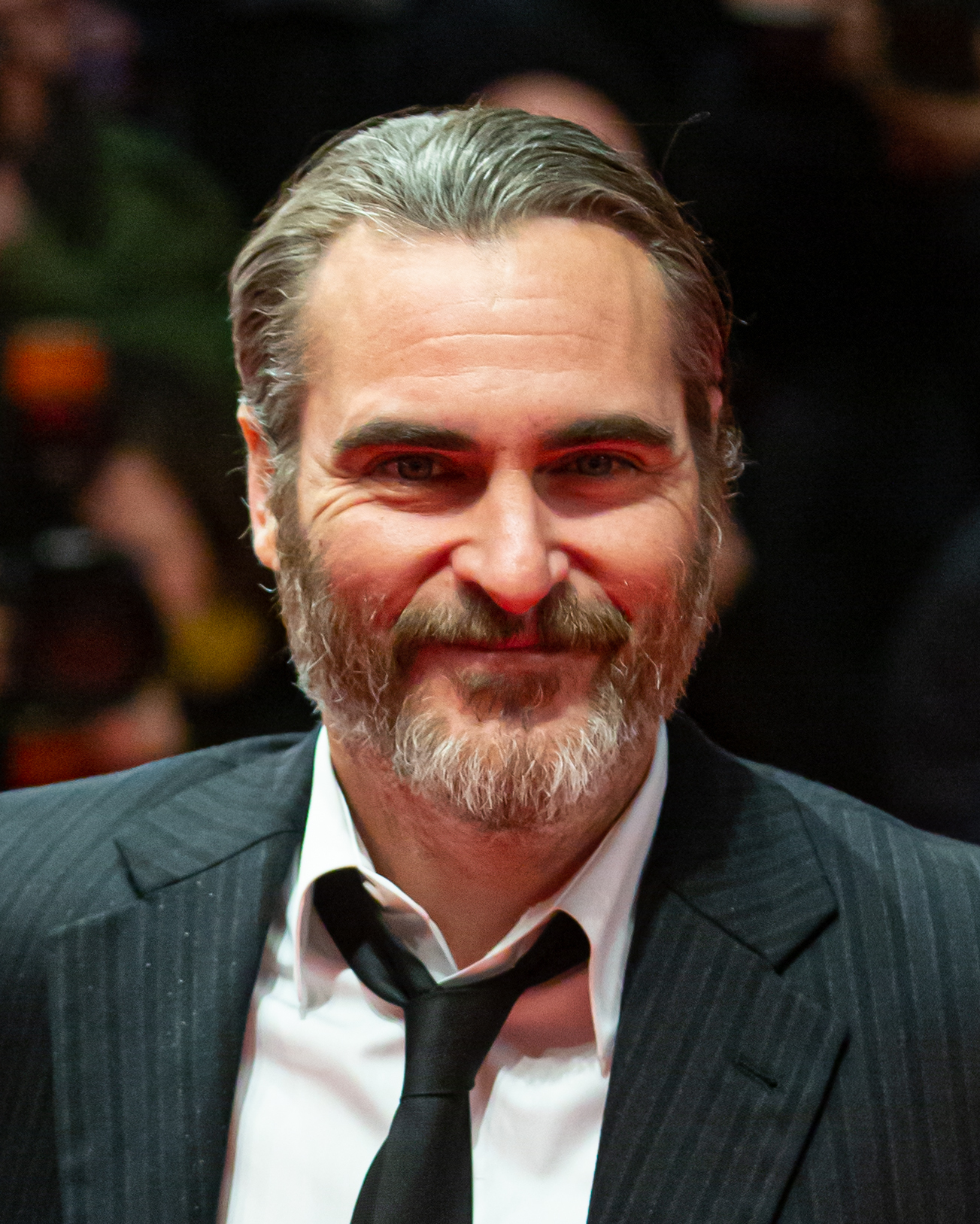
Joaquin Phoenix won for Joker (2019)

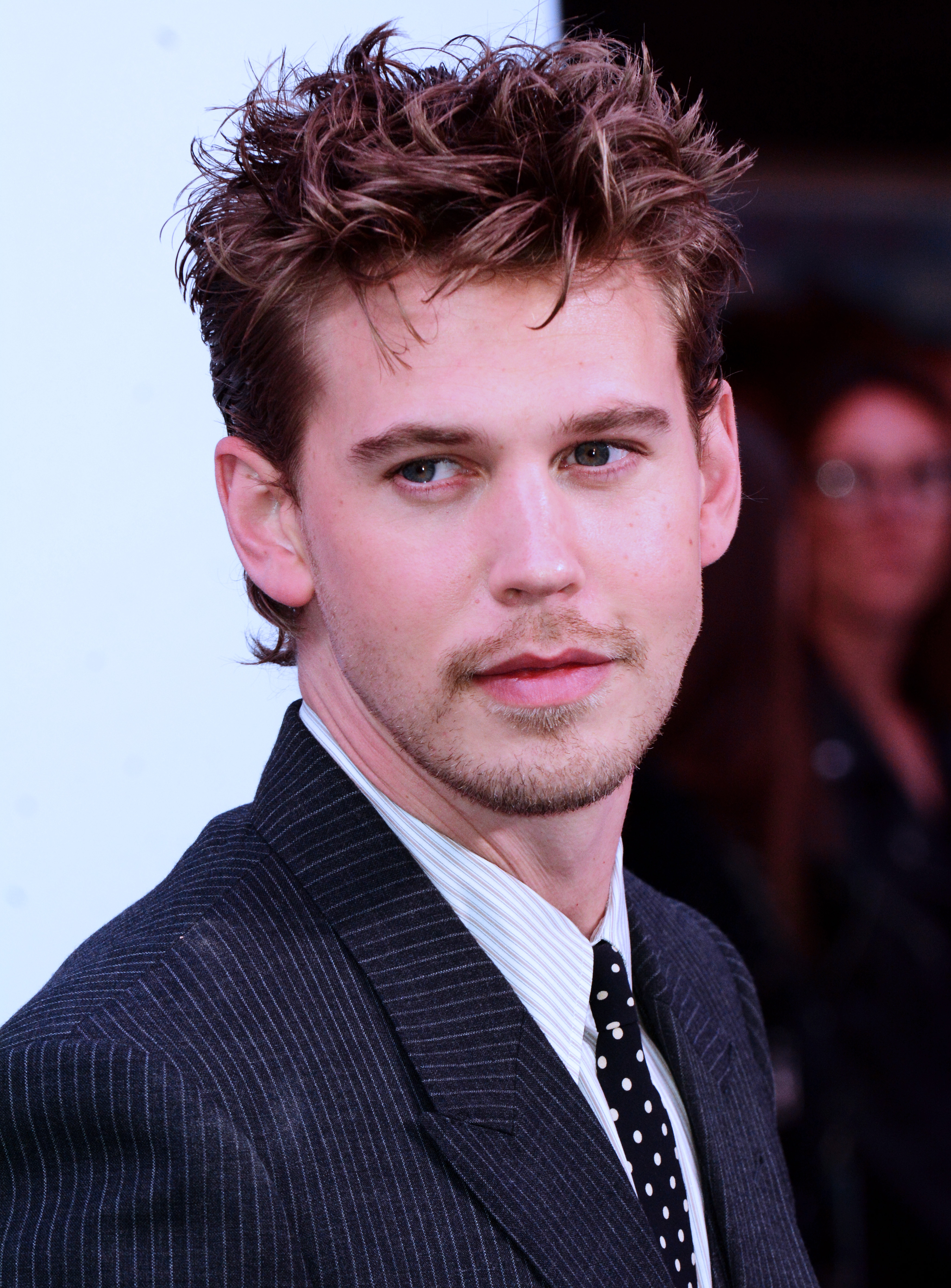
Austin Butler won for Elvis (2022)

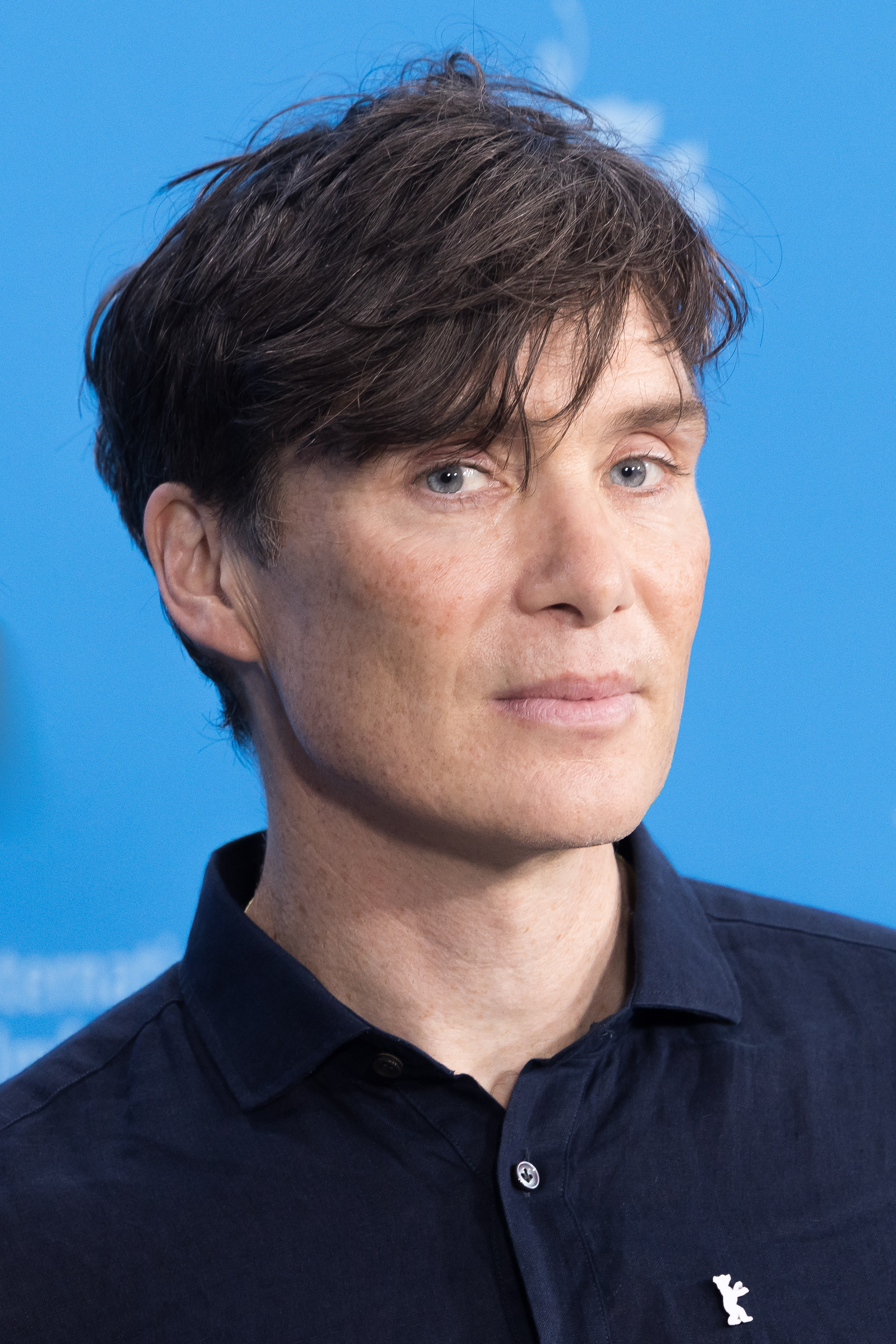
Cillian Murphy won for Oppenheimer (2023)

Adrien Brody won for The Brutalist (2024)

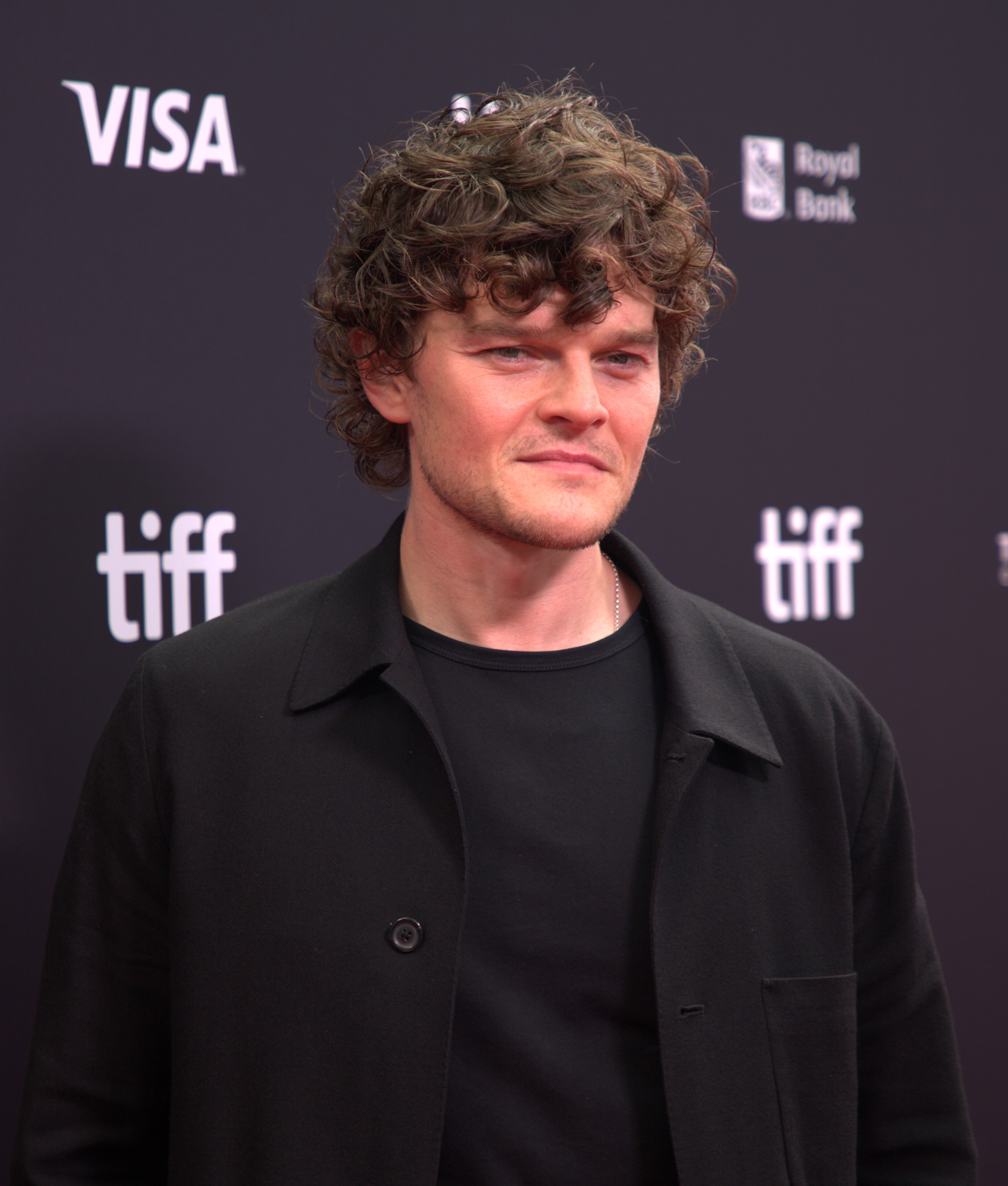
Robert Aramayo won for I Swear (2025)

=== 1950s ===
Year	Actor	Films	Role (s)	Ref.
**1952** (6th)	Best British Actor			
**1952** (6th)	**Ralph Richardson**	**The Sound Barrier**	**John Ridgefield**	
**1952** (6th)	Jack Hawkins	Mandy	Dick Searle	
**1952** (6th)	James Hayter	The Pickwick Papers	Samuel Pickwick	
**1952** (6th)	Laurence Olivier	Carrie	George Hurstwood	
**1952** (6th)	Nigel Patrick	The Sound Barrier	Tony Garthwaite	
**1952** (6th)	Alastair Sim	Folly to Be Wise	Captain William Paris	
**1952** (6th)	Best Foreign Actor			
**1952** (6th)	**Marlon Brando**	**Viva Zapata!**	**Emiliano Zapata**	
**1952** (6th)	Humphrey Bogart †	The African Queen	Charlie Allnut	
**1952** (6th)	Pierre Fresnay	God Needs Men	Thomas Gourvennec	
**1952** (6th)	Francesco Golisano	Miracle in Milan	Totò	
**1952** (6th)	Fredric March	Death of a Salesman	Willy Loman	
**1953** (7th)	Best British Actor			
**1953** (7th)	**John Gielgud**	**Julius Caesar**	**Cassius**	
**1953** (7th)	Jack Hawkins	The Cruel Sea	George Ericson	
**1953** (7th)	Trevor Howard	The Heart of the Matter	Harry Scobie	
**1953** (7th)	Duncan Macrae	The Kidnappers	Jim MacKenzie	
**1953** (7th)	Kenneth More	Genevieve	Ambrose Claverhouse	
**1953** (7th)	Best Foreign Actor			
**1953** (7th)	**Marlon Brando**	**Julius Caesar**	**Mark Antony**	
**1953** (7th)	Eddie Albert	Roman Holiday	Irving Radovich	
**1953** (7th)	Van Heflin	Shane	Joe Starrett	
**1953** (7th)	Claude Laydu	Diary of a Country Priest	Priest of Ambricourt	
**1953** (7th)	Marcel Mouloudji	We Are All Murderers	René Le Guen	
**1953** (7th)	Gregory Peck	Roman Holiday	Joe Bradley	
**1953** (7th)	Spencer Tracy	The Actress	Clinton Jones	
**1954** (8th)	Best British Actor			
**1954** (8th)	**Kenneth More**	**Doctor in the House**	**Richard Grimsdyke**	
**1954** (8th)	Maurice Denham	The Purple Plain	Blore	
**1954** (8th)	Robert Donat	Lease of Life	Rev. William Thorne	
**1954** (8th)	John Mills	Hobson's Choice	Will Mossop	
**1954** (8th)	David Niven	Carrington V.C.	Charles "Copper" Carrington	
**1954** (8th)	Donald Wolfit	Svengali	Svengali	
**1954** (8th)	Best Foreign Actor			
**1954** (8th)	**Marlon Brando** †	**On the Waterfront**	**Terry Malloy**	
**1954** (8th)	Neville Brand	Riot in Cell Block 11	James V. Dunn	
**1954** (8th)	José Ferrer	The Caine Mutiny	Barney Greenwald	
**1954** (8th)	Fredric March	Executive Suite	Loren Phineas Shaw	
**1954** (8th)	James Stewart	The Glenn Miller Story	Glenn Miller	
**1955** (9th)	Best British Actor			
**1955** (9th)	**Laurence Olivier**	**Richard III**	**Richard, Duke of Gloucester**	
**1955** (9th)	Alfie Bass	The Bespoke Overcoat	Fender	
**1955** (9th)	Alec Guinness	The Prisoner	The Cardinal	
**1955** (9th)	Jack Hawkins	The Prisoner	The Interrogator	
**1955** (9th)	Kenneth More	The Deep Blue Sea	Freddie Page	
**1955** (9th)	Michael Redgrave	The Night My Number Came Up	Air Mshl. Hardie	
**1955** (9th)	Best Foreign Actor			
**1955** (9th)	**Ernest Borgnine** †	**Marty**	**Marty Piletti**	
**1955** (9th)	James Dean (posthumous)	East of Eden	Cal Trask	
**1955** (9th)	Jack Lemmon	Mister Roberts	Frank Thurlowe Pulver	
**1955** (9th)	Toshiro Mifune	Seven Samurai	Kikuchiyo	
**1955** (9th)	Takashi Shimura	Seven Samurai	Kambei Shimada	
**1955** (9th)	Frank Sinatra	Not as a Stranger	Alfred Boone	
**1956** (10th)	Best British Actor			
**1956** (10th)	**Peter Finch**	**A Town Like Alice**	**Joe Harman**	
**1956** (10th)	Jack Hawkins	The Long Arm	Tom Halliday	
**1956** (10th)	Kenneth More	Reach for the Sky	Douglas Bader	
**1956** (10th)	Best Foreign Actor			
**1956** (10th)	**François Périer**	**Gervaise**	**Henri Coupeau**	
**1956** (10th)	Gunnar Björnstrand	Smiles of a Summer Night	Fredik Egerman	
**1956** (10th)	James Dean (posthumous)	Rebel Without a Cause	Jim Stark	
**1956** (10th)	Pierre Fresnay	The Unfrocked One	Maurice Morand	
**1956** (10th)	William Holden	Picnic	Hal Carter	
**1956** (10th)	Karl Malden	Baby Doll	Archie Lee Meighan	
**1956** (10th)	Frank Sinatra	The Man with the Golden Arm	Frankie Machine	
**1956** (10th)	Spencer Tracy	The Mountain	Zachary Teller	
**1957** (11th)	Best British Actor			
**1957** (11th)	**Alec Guinness** †	**The Bridge on the River Kwai**	**Cmdr. Nicholson**	
**1957** (11th)	Peter Finch	Windom's Way	Alec Windom	
**1957** (11th)	Trevor Howard	Manuela	James Prothero	
**1957** (11th)	Laurence Olivier	The Prince and the Showgirl	Charles, Prince Regent of Carpathia	
**1957** (11th)	Michael Redgrave	Time Without Pity	David Graham	
**1957** (11th)	Best Foreign Actor			
**1957** (11th)	**Henry Fonda**	**12 Angry Men**	**Juror 8**	
**1957** (11th)	Richard Basehart	Time Limit	Maj. Harry Cargill	
**1957** (11th)	Pierre Brasseur	The Gates of Paris	Juju	
**1957** (11th)	Tony Curtis	Sweet Smell of Success	Sidney Falco	
**1957** (11th)	Jean Gabin	La Traversé de Paris	Grandgil	
**1957** (11th)	Robert Mitchum	Heaven Knows, Mr Allison	Cpl. Allison	
**1957** (11th)	Sidney Poitier	Edge of the City	Tommy Tyler	
**1957** (11th)	Ed Wynn	The Great Man	Paul Beaseley	
**1958** (12th)	Best British Actor			
**1958** (12th)	**Trevor Howard**	**The Key**	**Chris Ford**	
**1958** (12th)	Michael Craig	Sea of Sand	Captain Tim Cotton	
**1958** (12th)	Laurence Harvey	Room at the Top	Joe Lampton	
**1958** (12th)	I. S. Johar	Harry Black	Bapu	
**1958** (12th)	Anthony Quayle	Ice Cold in Alex	Captain van der Poel / Haupt. Otto Lutz	
**1958** (12th)	Terry-Thomas	Tom Thumb	Ivan	
**1958** (12th)	Donald Wolfit	Room at the Top	Mr. Brown	
**1958** (12th)	Best Foreign Actor			
**1958** (12th)	**Sidney Poitier**	**The Defiant Ones**	**Noah Cullen**	
**1958** (12th)	Marlon Brando	The Young Lions	Christian Diestl	
**1958** (12th)	Tony Curtis	The Defiant Ones	John "Joker" Jackson	
**1958** (12th)	Glenn Ford	The Sheepman	Jason Sweet	
**1958** (12th)	Curd Jürgens	The Enemy Below	Kapt. von Stolberg	
**1958** (12th)	Curd Jürgens	The Inn of the Sixth Happiness	Captain Lin Nan	
**1958** (12th)	Charles Laughton	Witness for the Prosecution	Sir Wilfrid Robarts	
**1958** (12th)	Paul Newman	Cat on a Hot Tin Roof	Brick Pollitt	
**1958** (12th)	Victor Sjöström	Wild Strawberries	Prof. Isak Borg	
**1958** (12th)	Spencer Tracy	The Last Hurrah	Frank Skeffington	
**1959** (13th)	Best British Actor			
**1959** (13th)	**Peter Sellers**	**I'm All Right Jack**	**Fred Kite**	
**1959** (13th)	Stanley Baker	Yesterday's Enemy	Captain Langford	
**1959** (13th)	Richard Burton	Look Back in Anger	Jimmy Porter	
**1959** (13th)	Peter Finch	The Nun's Story	Dr. Fortunati	
**1959** (13th)	Laurence Harvey	Expresso Bongo	Johnny Jackson	
**1959** (13th)	Gordon Jackson	Yesterday's Enemy	Sgt. MacKenzie	
**1959** (13th)	Laurence Olivier	The Devil's Disciple	John Burgoyne	
**1959** (13th)	Best Foreign Actor			
**1959** (13th)	**Jack Lemmon**	**Some Like It Hot**	**Jerry / "Daphne"**	
**1959** (13th)	Jean Desailly	Maigret Sets a Trap	Marcel Maurin	
**1959** (13th)	Jean Gabin	Maigret Sets a Trap	Jules Maigret	
**1959** (13th)	Takashi Shimura	Living	Kanji Watanabe	
**1959** (13th)	James Stewart	Anatomy of a Murder	Paul Biegler	
**1959** (13th)	Zbigniew Cybulski	Ashes and Diamonds	Maciek Chelmicki	

=== 1960s ===
Year	Actor	Film	Role (s)	Ref.
**1960** (14th)	Best British Actor			
**1960** (14th)	**Peter Finch**	**The Trials of Oscar Wilde**	**Oscar Wilde**	
**1960** (14th)	Alec Guinness	Tunes of Glory	Maj. Jock Sinclair	
**1960** (14th)	John Mills	Tunes of Glory	Lt. Col. Basil Barrow	
**1960** (14th)	Richard Attenborough	The Angry Silence	Tom Curtis	
**1960** (14th)	John Fraser	The Trials of Oscar Wilde	Lord Alfred Douglas	
**1960** (14th)	Laurence Olivier	The Entertainer	Archie Rice	
**1960** (14th)	Albert Finney	Saturday Night and Sunday Morning	Arthur Seaton	
**1960** (14th)	Best Foreign Actor			
**1960** (14th)	**Jack Lemmon**	**The Apartment**	**C. C. Baxter**	
**1960** (14th)	Burt Lancaster †	Elmer Gantry	Elmer Gantry	
**1960** (14th)	Fredric March	Inherit the Wind	Matthew Harrison Brady	
**1960** (14th)	Spencer Tracy	Inherit the Wind	Henry Drummond	
**1960** (14th)	George Hamilton	Crime and Punishment U.S.A.	Robert Cole	
**1960** (14th)	Yves Montand	Let's Make Love	Jean-Marc Clement / Alexander Dumas	
**1961** (15th)	Best British Actor			
**1961** (15th)	**Peter Finch**	**No Love for Johnnie**	**Johnnie Byrne**	
**1961** (15th)	Dirk Bogarde	Victim	Melville Farr	
**1961** (15th)	Best Foreign Actor			
**1961** (15th)	**Paul Newman**	**The Hustler**	**"Fast Eddie" Felson**	
**1961** (15th)	Montgomery Clift	Judgment at Nuremberg	Rudolph Petersen	
**1961** (15th)	Vladimir Ivashov	Ballad of a Soldier	Pvt. Alyosha Skvortsov	
**1961** (15th)	Philippe Leroy	The Night Watch	Manu Borelli	
**1961** (15th)	Sidney Poitier	A Raisin in the Sun	Walter Lee Younger	
**1961** (15th)	Maximilian Schell †	Judgment at Nuremberg	Hans Rolfe	
**1961** (15th)	Alberto Sordi	The Best of Enemies	Captain Blasi	
**1962** (16th)	Best British Actor			
**1962** (16th)	**Peter O'Toole**	**Lawrence of Arabia**	**T. E. Lawrence**	
**1962** (16th)	Richard Attenborough	The Dock Brief	Herbert Fowle	
**1962** (16th)	Alan Bates	A Kind of Loving	Victor 'Vic' Brown	
**1962** (16th)	James Mason	Lolita	Humbert Humbert	
**1962** (16th)	Laurence Olivier	Term of Trial	Graham Weir	
**1962** (16th)	Peter Sellers	Only Two Can Play	John Lewis	
**1962** (16th)	Best Foreign Actor			
**1962** (16th)	**Burt Lancaster**	**Birdman of Alcatraz**	**Robert Stroud**	
**1962** (16th)	Jean-Paul Belmondo	Léon Morin, Priest	Léon Morin	
**1962** (16th)	Kirk Douglas	Lonely are the Brave	John W. "Jack" Burns	
**1962** (16th)	George Hamilton	Light in the Piazza	Fabrizio Naccarelli	
**1962** (16th)	Anthony Quinn	Lawrence of Arabia	Auda ibu Tayi	
**1962** (16th)	Robert Ryan	Billy Budd	John Claggart	
**1962** (16th)	Georges Wilson	The Long Absence	The Tramp	
**1962** (16th)	Charles Laughton	Advise and Consent	Sen. Seabright "Seeb" Cooley	
**1963** (17th)	Best British Actor			
**1963** (17th)	**Dirk Bogarde**	**The Servant**	**Hugo Barrett**	
**1963** (17th)	Albert Finney	Tom Jones	Tom Jones	
**1963** (17th)	Hugh Griffith	Tom Jones	Squire Western	
**1963** (17th)	Richard Harris	This Sporting Life	Frank Machin	
**1963** (17th)	Tom Courtenay	Billy Liar	William Terrence 'Billy' Fisher	
**1963** (17th)	Best Foreign Actor			
**1963** (17th)	**Marcello Mastroianni**	**Divorce Italian Style**	**Ferdinando Cefalù**	
**1963** (17th)	Franco Citti	Accattone	Vittorio "Accattone" Cataldi	
**1963** (17th)	Howard Da Silva	David and Lisa	Dr. Swinford	
**1963** (17th)	Jack Lemmon	Days of Wine and Roses	Joe Clay	
**1963** (17th)	Paul Newman	Hud	Hud Bannon	
**1963** (17th)	Gregory Peck †	To Kill a Mockingbird	Atticus Finch	
**1964** (18th)	Best British Actor			
**1964** (18th)	**Richard Attenborough ^{[A]}**	**Guns at Batasi**	**RSM Lauderdale**	
**1964** (18th)	**Richard Attenborough ^{[A]}**	**Seance on a Wet Afternoon**	**Billy Savage**	
**1964** (18th)	Peter Sellers ^{[A]}	Dr. Strangelove	Gp Capt. Lionel Mandrake, President Merkin Muffley & Dr. Strangelove	
**1964** (18th)	Peter Sellers ^{[A]}	The Pink Panther	Inspector Jacques Clouseau	
**1964** (18th)	Tom Courtenay	King & Country	Pvt. Arthur Hamp	
**1964** (18th)	Peter O'Toole	Becket	King Henry II	
**1964** (18th)	Best Foreign Actor			
**1964** (18th)	**Marcello Mastroianni**	**Yesterday, Today and Tomorrow**	**Carmine Sbaratti / Renzo / Augusto Rusconi**	
**1964** (18th)	Cary Grant	Charade	Peter Joshua	
**1964** (18th)	Sterling Hayden	Dr. Strangelove	BG Jack D. Ripper	
**1964** (18th)	Sidney Poitier †	Lilies of the Field	Homer Smith	
**1965** (19th)	Best British Actor			
**1965** (19th)	**Dirk Bogarde**	**Darling**	**Robert Gold**	
**1965** (19th)	Harry Andrews	The Hill	RSM Wilson	
**1965** (19th)	Michael Caine	The Ipcress File	Harry Palmer	
**1965** (19th)	Rex Harrison †	My Fair Lady	Prof. Henry Higgins	
**1965** (19th)	Best Foreign Actor			
**1965** (19th)	**Lee Marvin ^{[A]}**	**Cat Ballou**	**Kid Shelleen & Tim Strawn**	
**1965** (19th)	**Lee Marvin ^{[A]}**	**The Killers**	**Charlie Strom**	
**1965** (19th)	Jack Lemmon ^{[A]}	Good Neighbor Sam	Sam Bissell	
**1965** (19th)	Jack Lemmon ^{[A]}	How to Murder Your Wife	Stanley Ford	
**1965** (19th)	Anthony Quinn	Zorba the Greek	Alexis Zorba	
**1965** (19th)	Innokenty Smoktunovsky	Hamlet	Prince Hamlet	
**1965** (19th)	Oskar Werner	Ship of Fools	Dr. Wilhelm "Willi" Schumann	
**1966** (20th)	Best British Actor			
**1966** (20th)	**Richard Burton ^{[A]}**	**The Spy Who Came in from the Cold**	**Alec Leamas**	
**1966** (20th)	**Richard Burton ^{[A]}**	**Who's Afraid of Virginia Woolf?**	**George**	
**1966** (20th)	Ralph Richardson ^{[A]}	Doctor Zhivago	Alexander Maximovich Gromeko	
**1966** (20th)	Ralph Richardson ^{[A]}	Khartoum	William Ewart Gladstone	
**1966** (20th)	Ralph Richardson ^{[A]}	The Wrong Box	Joseph Finsbury	
**1966** (20th)	Michael Caine	Alfie	Alfred "Alfie" Elkins	
**1966** (20th)	David Warner	Morgan – A Suitable Case for Treatment	Morgan Delt	
**1966** (20th)	Best Foreign Actor			
**1966** (20th)	**Rod Steiger**	**The Pawnbroker**	**Sol Nazerman**	
**1966** (20th)	Sidney Poitier	A Patch of Blue	Gordon Ralfe	
**1966** (20th)	Jean-Paul Belmondo	Pierrot le Fou	Ferdinand Griffon / "Pierrot"	
**1966** (20th)	Oskar Werner	The Spy Who Came in from the Cold	Fiedler	
**1967** (21st)	Best British Actor			
**1967** (21st)	**Paul Scofield** †	**A Man for All Seasons**	**Sir Thomas More**	
**1967** (21st)	Dirk Bogarde ^{[A]}	Accident	Stephen	
**1967** (21st)	Dirk Bogarde ^{[A]}	Our Mother's House	Charlie Hook	
**1967** (21st)	Richard Burton	The Taming of the Shrew	Petruchio	
**1967** (21st)	James Mason	The Deadly Affair	Charles Dobbs	
**1967** (21st)	Best Foreign Actor			
**1967** (21st)	**Rod Steiger** †	**In the Heat of the Night**	**Police Chief Bill Gillespie**	
**1967** (21st)	Warren Beatty	Bonnie and Clyde	Clyde Barrow	
**1967** (21st)	Sidney Poitier	In the Heat of the Night	Detective Virgil Tibbs	
**1967** (21st)	Orson Welles	Chimes at Midnight	Sir John Falstaff	
**1968** (22nd)	Best Actor			
**1968** (22nd)	**Spencer Tracy**	**Guess Who's Coming to Dinner**	**Matt Drayton**	
**1968** (22nd)	Ron Moody	Oliver!	Fagin	
**1968** (22nd)	Nicol Williamson	The Bofors Gun	Gunner O'Rourke	
**1968** (22nd)	Trevor Howard	The Charge of the Light Brigade	Lord Cardigan	
**1969** (23rd)	**Dustin Hoffman ^{[A]}**	**John and Mary**	**John**	
**1969** (23rd)	**Dustin Hoffman ^{[A]}**	**Midnight Cowboy**	**Enrico Salvatore "Ratso" Rizzo**	
**1969** (23rd)	Walter Matthau ^{[A]}	Hello, Dolly!	Horace Vandergelder	
**1969** (23rd)	Walter Matthau ^{[A]}	The Secret Life of an American Wife	The Movie Star	
**1969** (23rd)	Alan Bates	Women in Love	Rupert Birkin	
**1969** (23rd)	Nicol Williamson	Inadmissible Evidence	Bill Maitland	

=== 1970s ===
Year	Actor	Films	Role (s)	Ref.
**1970** (24th)	**Robert Redford ^{[A]}**	**Butch Cassidy and the Sundance Kid**	**Sundance Kid**	
**1970** (24th)	**Robert Redford ^{[A]}**	**Downhill Racer**	**David Chappellet**	
**1970** (24th)	**Robert Redford ^{[A]}**	**Tell Them Willie Boy Is Here**	**Deputy Sheriff Christopher Cooper**	
**1970** (24th)	Elliott Gould ^{[A]}	Bob & Carol & Ted & Alice	Ted Henderson	
**1970** (24th)	Elliott Gould ^{[A]}	M*A*S*H	Captain John Francis "Trapper John" McIntyre	
**1970** (24th)	George C. Scott †	Patton	George S. Patton	
**1970** (24th)	Paul Newman	Butch Cassidy and the Sundance Kid	Butch Cassidy	
**1971** (25th)	**Peter Finch**	**Sunday Bloody Sunday**	**Dr. Daniel Hirsh**	
**1971** (25th)	Dirk Bogarde	Death in Venice	Gustav von Aschenbach	
**1971** (25th)	Albert Finney	Gumshoe	Eddie Ginley	
**1971** (25th)	Dustin Hoffman	Little Big Man	Jack Crabb	
**1972** (26th)	**Gene Hackman ^{[A]}** †	**The French Connection** †	**Jimmy "Popeye" Doyle**	
**1972** (26th)	**Gene Hackman ^{[A]}** †	**The Poseidon Adventure**	**Reverend Frank Scott**	
**1972** (26th)	Marlon Brando ^{[A]} †	The Godfather †	Vito Corleone	
**1972** (26th)	Marlon Brando ^{[A]} †	The Nightcomers	Peter Quint	
**1972** (26th)	George C. Scott ^{[A]}	The Hospital	Dr. Herbert "Herb" Bock	
**1972** (26th)	George C. Scott ^{[A]}	They Might Be Giants	Justin Playfair	
**1972** (26th)	Robert Shaw	Young Winston	Lord Randolph Churchill	
**1973** (27th)	**Walter Matthau ^{[A]}**	**Charley Varrick**	**Charley Varrick**	
**1973** (27th)	**Walter Matthau ^{[A]}**	**Pete 'n' Tillie**	**Pete Seltzer**	
**1973** (27th)	Donald Sutherland ^{[A]}	Don't Look Now	John Baxter	
**1973** (27th)	Donald Sutherland ^{[A]}	Steelyard Blues	Jesse Veldini	
**1973** (27th)	Marlon Brando	Last Tango in Paris	Paul	
**1973** (27th)	Laurence Olivier	Sleuth	Andrew Wyke	
**1974** (28th)	**Jack Nicholson ^{[A]}**	**Chinatown**	**J.J. "Jake" Gittes**	
**1974** (28th)	**Jack Nicholson ^{[A]}**	**The Last Detail**	**Signalman 1st Class Billy "Badass" Buddusky**	
**1974** (28th)	Albert Finney	Murder on the Orient Express	Hercule Poirot	
**1974** (28th)	Gene Hackman	The Conversation	Harry Caul	
**1974** (28th)	Al Pacino	Serpico	Frank Serpico	
**1975** (29th)	**Al Pacino ^{[A]}**	**Dog Day Afternoon**	**Sonny Wortzik**	
**1975** (29th)	**Al Pacino ^{[A]}**	**The Godfather Part II**	**Michael Corleone**	
**1975** (29th)	Gene Hackman ^{[A]}	French Connection II	Jimmy "Popeye" Doyle	
**1975** (29th)	Gene Hackman ^{[A]}	Night Moves	Harry Moseby	
**1975** (29th)	Richard Dreyfuss	Jaws	Matt Hooper	
**1975** (29th)	Dustin Hoffman	Lenny	Lenny Bruce	
**1976** (30th)	**Jack Nicholson** †	**One Flew Over the Cuckoo's Nest**	**Randle McMurphy**	
**1976** (30th)	Dustin Hoffman ^{[A]}	All the President's Men	Carl Bernstein	
**1976** (30th)	Dustin Hoffman ^{[A]}	Marathon Man	Thomas "Babe" Levy	
**1976** (30th)	Walter Matthau ^{[A]}	The Bad News Bears	Morris Buttermaker	
**1976** (30th)	Walter Matthau ^{[A]}	The Sunshine Boys	Willy Clark	
**1976** (30th)	Robert De Niro	Taxi Driver	Travis Bickle	
**1977** (31st)	**Peter Finch** (posthumous) †	**Network**	**Howard Beale**	
**1977** (31st)	Woody Allen	Annie Hall	Alvy Singer	
**1977** (31st)	William Holden	Network	Max Schumacher	
**1977** (31st)	Sylvester Stallone	Rocky	Rocky Balboa	
**1978** (32nd)	**Richard Dreyfuss** †	**The Goodbye Girl**	**Elliot Garfield**	
**1978** (32nd)	Anthony Hopkins	Magic	Corky Withers / Fats (voice)	
**1978** (32nd)	Brad Davis	Midnight Express	Billy Hayes	
**1978** (32nd)	Peter Ustinov	Death on the Nile	Hercule Poirot	
**1979** (33rd)	**Jack Lemmon**	**The China Syndrome**	**Jack Godell**	
**1979** (33rd)	Woody Allen	Manhattan	Isaac Davis	
**1979** (33rd)	Martin Sheen	Apocalypse Now	Captain Benjamin L. Willard	
**1979** (33rd)	Robert De Niro	The Deer Hunter	S/Sgt. Michael "Mike" Vronsky	

=== 1980s ===
Year	Actor	Films	Role (s)	Ref.
**1980** (34th)	**John Hurt**	**The Elephant Man**	**John Merrick**	
**1980** (34th)	Dustin Hoffman †	Kramer vs. Kramer	Ted Kramer	
**1980** (34th)	Roy Scheider	All That Jazz	Joe Gideon	
**1980** (34th)	Peter Sellers	Being There	Chance The Gardener / Chauncey Gardiner	
**1981** (35th)	**Burt Lancaster**	**Atlantic City**	**Lou Pascal**	
**1981** (35th)	Robert De Niro †	Raging Bull	Jake LaMotta	
**1981** (35th)	Bob Hoskins	The Long Good Friday	Harold Shand	
**1981** (35th)	Jeremy Irons	The French Lieutenant's Woman	Charles Henry Smithson / Mike	
**1982** (36th)	**Ben Kingsley** †	**Gandhi**	**Mahatma Gandhi**	
**1982** (36th)	Warren Beatty	Reds	John Reed	
**1982** (36th)	Albert Finney	Shoot the Moon	George Dunlap	
**1982** (36th)	Henry Fonda †	On Golden Pond	Norman Thayer Jr.	
**1982** (36th)	Jack Lemmon	Missing	Ed Horman	
**1983** (37th)	**Michael Caine (TIE) ^{[B]}**	**Educating Rita**	**Dr. Frank Bryant**	
**1983** (37th)	**Dustin Hoffman (TIE) ^{[B]}**	**Tootsie**	**Michael Dorsey / Dorothy Michaels**	
**1983** (37th)	Michael Caine	The Honorary Consul	Charley Fortnum	
**1983** (37th)	Robert De Niro	The King of Comedy	Rupert Pupkin	
**1984** (38th)	**Haing S. Ngor**	**The Killing Fields**	**Dith Pran**	
**1984** (38th)	Tom Courtenay	The Dresser	Norman	
**1984** (38th)	Albert Finney	The Dresser	Sir	
**1984** (38th)	Sam Waterston	The Killing Fields	Sydney Schanberg	
**1985** (39th)	**William Hurt** †	**Kiss of the Spider Woman**	**Luis Molina**	
**1985** (39th)	F. Murray Abraham †	Amadeus	Antonio Salieri	
**1985** (39th)	Victor Banerjee	A Passage to India	Dr. Aziz Ahmed	
**1985** (39th)	Harrison Ford	Witness	John Book	
**1986** (40th)	**Bob Hoskins**	**Mona Lisa**	**George**	
**1986** (40th)	Woody Allen	Hannah and Her Sisters	Mickey Sachs	
**1986** (40th)	Michael Caine	Hannah and Her Sisters	Elliot	
**1986** (40th)	Paul Hogan	Crocodile Dundee	Michael "Crocodile" Dundee	
**1987** (41st)	**Sean Connery**	**The Name of the Rose**	**William of Baskerville**	
**1987** (41st)	Gérard Depardieu	Jean de Florette	Jean Cadoret / "Jean de Florette"	
**1987** (41st)	Yves Montand	Jean de Florette	César Soubeyran / Le Papet	
**1987** (41st)	Gary Oldman	Prick Up Your Ears	Joe Orton	
**1988** (42nd)	**John Cleese**	**A Fish Called Wanda**	**Archie Leach**	
**1988** (42nd)	Michael Douglas	Fatal Attraction	Dan Gallagher	
**1988** (42nd)	Kevin Kline	A Fish Called Wanda	Otto West	
**1988** (42nd)	Robin Williams	Good Morning, Vietnam	Adrian Cronauer	
**1989** (43rd)	**Daniel Day-Lewis** †	**My Left Foot**	**Christy Brown**	
**1989** (43rd)	Kenneth Branagh	Henry V	King Henry V	
**1989** (43rd)	Dustin Hoffman †	Rain Man	Raymond Babbit	
**1989** (43rd)	Robin Williams	Dead Poets Society	John Keating	

=== 1990s ===
Year	Actor	Films	Role (s)	Ref.
**1990** (44th)	**Philippe Noiret**	**Cinema Paradiso**	**Alfredo**	
**1990** (44th)	Sean Connery	The Hunt for Red October	Captain Marko Ramius	
**1990** (44th)	Tom Cruise	Born on the Fourth of July	Ron Kovic	
**1990** (44th)	Robert De Niro	Goodfellas	Jimmy Conway	
**1991** (45th)	**Anthony Hopkins** †	**The Silence of the Lambs**	**Dr. Hannibal Lecter**	
**1991** (45th)	Gérard Depardieu	Cyrano de Bergerac	Cyrano de Bergerac	
**1991** (45th)	Alan Rickman	Truly, Madly, Deeply	Jamie	
**1991** (45th)	Kevin Costner	Dances With Wolves	Lt. John J. Dunbar / Dances with Wolves	
**1992** (46th)	**Robert Downey Jr.**	**Chaplin**	**Charlie Chaplin**	
**1992** (46th)	Daniel Day-Lewis	The Last of the Mohicans	Nathaniel "Hawkeye" Poe	
**1992** (46th)	Stephen Rea	The Crying Game	Fergus	
**1992** (46th)	Tim Robbins	The Player	Griffin Mill	
**1993** (47th)	**Anthony Hopkins**	**The Remains of the Day**	**James Stevens**	
**1993** (47th)	Daniel Day-Lewis	In the Name of the Father	Gerry Conlon	
**1993** (47th)	Anthony Hopkins	Shadowlands	C. S. Lewis	
**1993** (47th)	Liam Neeson	Schindler's List	Oskar Schindler	
**1994** (48th)	**Hugh Grant**	**Four Weddings and a Funeral**	**Charles**	
**1994** (48th)	Tom Hanks †	Forrest Gump	Forrest Gump	
**1994** (48th)	John Travolta	Pulp Fiction	Vincent Vega	
**1994** (48th)	Terence Stamp	The Adventures of Priscilla, Queen of the Desert	Bernadette Bassenger	
**1995** (49th)	**Nigel Hawthorne**	**The Madness of King George**	**King George III**	
**1995** (49th)	Nicolas Cage †	Leaving Las Vegas	Ben Sanderson	
**1995** (49th)	Jonathan Pryce	Carrington	Lytton Strachey	
**1995** (49th)	Massimo Troisi (posthumous)	Il Postino: The Postman	Mario Ruoppolo	
**1996** (50th)	**Geoffrey Rush** †	**Shine**	**David Helfgott**	
**1996** (50th)	Ralph Fiennes	The English Patient	Count László de Almásy	
**1996** (50th)	Ian McKellen	Richard III	King Richard III	
**1996** (50th)	Timothy Spall	Secrets & Lies	Maurice Purley	
**1997** (51st)	**Robert Carlyle**	**The Full Monty**	**Gaz Schofield**	
**1997** (51st)	Billy Connolly	Mrs Brown	John Brown	
**1997** (51st)	Kevin Spacey	L.A. Confidential	Jack Vincennes	
**1997** (51st)	Ray Winstone	Nil by Mouth	Raymond	
**1998** (52nd)	**Roberto Benigni** †	**Life Is Beautiful**	**Guido Orefice**	
**1998** (52nd)	Michael Caine	Little Voice	Ray Say	
**1998** (52nd)	Joseph Fiennes	Shakespeare in Love	William Shakespeare	
**1998** (52nd)	Tom Hanks	Saving Private Ryan	Captain John H. Miller	
**1999** (53rd)	**Kevin Spacey** †	**American Beauty**	**Lester Burnham**	
**1999** (53rd)	Jim Broadbent	Topsy-Turvy	W. S. Gilbert	
**1999** (53rd)	Russell Crowe	The Insider	Jeffrey Wigand	
**1999** (53rd)	Ralph Fiennes	The End of the Affair	Maurice Bendrax	
**1999** (53rd)	Om Puri	East is East	Zahir "George" Khan	

=== 2000s ===
Year	Actor	Films	Role (s)	Ref.
**2000** (54th)	**Jamie Bell**	**Billy Elliot**	**Billy Elliot**	
**2000** (54th)	Russell Crowe †	Gladiator	Maximus Decimus Meridius	
**2000** (54th)	Michael Douglas	Wonder Boys	Grady Tripp	
**2000** (54th)	Tom Hanks	Cast Away	Chuck Noland	
**2000** (54th)	Geoffrey Rush	Quills	Marquis de Sade	
**2001** (55th)	**Russell Crowe**	**A Beautiful Mind**	**John Forbes Nash Jr.**	
**2001** (55th)	Jim Broadbent	Iris	John Bayley	
**2001** (55th)	Kevin Spacey	The Shipping News	Quoyle	
**2001** (55th)	Tom Wilkinson	In the Bedroom	Matt Fowler	
**2001** (55th)	Ian McKellen	The Lord of the Rings: The Fellowship of the Ring	Gandalf	
**2002** (56th)	**Daniel Day-Lewis**	**Gangs of New York**	**William "Bill the Butcher" Cutting**	
**2002** (56th)	Adrien Brody †	The Pianist	Władysław Szpilman	
**2002** (56th)	Nicolas Cage	Adaptation	Charlie and Donald Kaufman	
**2002** (56th)	Michael Caine	The Quiet American	Thomas Fowler	
**2002** (56th)	Jack Nicholson	About Schmidt	Warren R. Schmidt	
**2003** (57th)	**Bill Murray**	**Lost in Translation**	**Bob Harris**	
**2003** (57th)	Sean Penn †	21 Grams	Paul Rivers	
**2003** (57th)	Sean Penn †	Mystic River †	Jimmy Markum	
**2003** (57th)	Benicio del Toro	21 Grams	Jack Jordan	
**2003** (57th)	Jude Law	Cold Mountain	William "W.P." Inman	
**2003** (57th)	Johnny Depp	Pirates of the Caribbean: The Curse of the Black Pearl	Captain Jack Sparrow	
**2004** (58th)	**Jamie Foxx** †	**Ray**	**Ray Charles**	
**2004** (58th)	Jim Carrey	Eternal Sunshine of the Spotless Mind	Joel Barish	
**2004** (58th)	Johnny Depp	Finding Neverland	J. M. Barrie	
**2004** (58th)	Leonardo DiCaprio	The Aviator	Howard Hughes	
**2004** (58th)	Gael García Bernal	The Motorcycle Diaries	Ernesto "Che" Guevara	
**2005** (59th)	**Philip Seymour Hoffman** †	**Capote**	**Truman Capote**	
**2005** (59th)	Ralph Fiennes	The Constant Gardener	Justin Quayle	
**2005** (59th)	Heath Ledger	Brokeback Mountain	Ennis Del Mar	
**2005** (59th)	Joaquin Phoenix	Walk the Line	Johnny Cash	
**2005** (59th)	David Strathairn	Good Night, and Good Luck	Edward R. Murrow	
**2006** (60th)	**Forest Whitaker** †	**The Last King of Scotland**	**Idi Amin**	
**2006** (60th)	Daniel Craig	Casino Royale	James Bond	
**2006** (60th)	Leonardo DiCaprio	The Departed	William "Billy" Costigan Jr.	
**2006** (60th)	Richard Griffiths	The History Boys	Hector	
**2006** (60th)	Peter O'Toole	Venus	Maurice Russell	
**2007** (61st)	**Daniel Day-Lewis** †	**There Will Be Blood**	**Daniel Plainview**	
**2007** (61st)	George Clooney	Michael Clayton	Michael Clayton	
**2007** (61st)	James McAvoy	Atonement	Robbie Turner	
**2007** (61st)	Viggo Mortensen	Eastern Promises	Nikolai Luzhin	
**2007** (61st)	Ulrich Mühe (posthumous)	The Lives of Others	Gerd Wiesler	
**2008** (62nd)	**Mickey Rourke**	**The Wrestler**	**Randy "The Ram" Robinson**	
**2008** (62nd)	Frank Langella	Frost/Nixon	Richard Nixon	
**2008** (62nd)	Dev Patel	Slumdog Millionaire	Jamal Malik	
**2008** (62nd)	Sean Penn †	Milk	Harvey Milk	
**2008** (62nd)	Brad Pitt	The Curious Case of Benjamin Button	Benjamin Button	
**2009** (63rd)	**Colin Firth**	**A Single Man**	**George Falconer**	
**2009** (63rd)	Jeff Bridges †	Crazy Heart	Otis "Bad" Blake	
**2009** (63rd)	George Clooney	Up in the Air	Ryan Bingham	
**2009** (63rd)	Jeremy Renner	The Hurt Locker	SFC. William James	
**2009** (63rd)	Andy Serkis	Sex & Drugs & Rock & Roll	Ian Dury	

=== 2010s ===
Year	Actor	Films	Role (s)	Ref.
**2010** (64th)	**Colin Firth** †	**The King's Speech**	**King George VI**	
**2010** (64th)	Javier Bardem	Biutiful	Uxbal	
**2010** (64th)	Jeff Bridges	True Grit	Reuben "Rooster" Cogburn	
**2010** (64th)	Jesse Eisenberg	The Social Network	Mark Zuckerberg	
**2010** (64th)	James Franco	127 Hours	Aron Ralston	
**2011** (65th)	**Jean Dujardin** †	**The Artist**	**George Valentin**	
**2011** (65th)	George Clooney	The Descendants	Matthew "Matt" King	
**2011** (65th)	Michael Fassbender	Shame	Brandon Sullivan	
**2011** (65th)	Gary Oldman	Tinker Tailor Soldier Spy	George Smiley	
**2011** (65th)	Brad Pitt	Moneyball	Billy Beane	
**2012** (66th)	**Daniel Day-Lewis** †	**Lincoln**	**Abraham Lincoln**	
**2012** (66th)	Ben Affleck	Argo	Tony Mendez	
**2012** (66th)	Bradley Cooper	Silver Linings Playbook	Patrick "Pat" Solitano Jr.	
**2012** (66th)	Hugh Jackman	Les Misérables	Jean Valjean	
**2012** (66th)	Joaquin Phoenix	The Master	Freddie Quell	
**2013** (67th)	**Chiwetel Ejiofor**	**12 Years a Slave**	**Solomon Northup**	
**2013** (67th)	Christian Bale	American Hustle	Irving Rosenfeld	
**2013** (67th)	Bruce Dern	Nebraska	Woodrow T. "Woody" Grant	
**2013** (67th)	Leonardo DiCaprio	The Wolf of Wall Street	Jordan Belfort	
**2013** (67th)	Tom Hanks	Captain Phillips	Captain Richard Phillips	
**2014** (68th)	**Eddie Redmayne** †	**The Theory of Everything**	**Stephen Hawking**	
**2014** (68th)	Benedict Cumberbatch	The Imitation Game	Alan Turing	
**2014** (68th)	Ralph Fiennes	The Grand Budapest Hotel	Monsieur Gustave H.	
**2014** (68th)	Jake Gyllenhaal	Nightcrawler	Louis "Lou" Bloom	
**2014** (68th)	Michael Keaton	Birdman	Riggan Thomson	
**2015** (69th)	**Leonardo DiCaprio** †	**The Revenant**	**Hugh Glass**	
**2015** (69th)	Bryan Cranston	Trumbo	Dalton Trumbo	
**2015** (69th)	Matt Damon	The Martian	Mark Watney	
**2015** (69th)	Michael Fassbender	Steve Jobs	Steve Jobs	
**2015** (69th)	Eddie Redmayne	The Danish Girl	Lili Elbe / Einar Wegener	
**2016** (70th)	**Casey Affleck** †	**Manchester by the Sea**	**Lee Chandler**	
**2016** (70th)	Andrew Garfield	Hacksaw Ridge	Desmond T. Doss	
**2016** (70th)	Ryan Gosling	La La Land	Sebastian Wilder	
**2016** (70th)	Jake Gyllenhaal	Nocturnal Animals	Edward Sheffield / Tony Hastings	
**2016** (70th)	Viggo Mortensen	Captain Fantastic	Ben Cash	
**2017** (71st)	**Gary Oldman** †	**Darkest Hour**	**Winston Churchill**	
**2017** (71st)	Jamie Bell	Film Stars Don't Die in Liverpool	Peter Turner	
**2017** (71st)	Timothée Chalamet	Call Me by Your Name	Elio Perlman	
**2017** (71st)	Daniel Day-Lewis	Phantom Thread	Reynolds Woodcock	
**2017** (71st)	Daniel Kaluuya	Get Out	Chris Washington	
**2018** (72nd)	**Rami Malek** †	**Bohemian Rhapsody**	**Freddie Mercury**	
**2018** (72nd)	Christian Bale	Vice	Dick Cheney	
**2018** (72nd)	Steve Coogan	Stan & Ollie	Stan Laurel	
**2018** (72nd)	Bradley Cooper	A Star Is Born	Jackson "Jack" Maine	
**2018** (72nd)	Viggo Mortensen	Green Book	Frank "Tony Lip" Vallelonga	
**2019** (73rd)	**Joaquin Phoenix** †	**Joker**	**Arthur Fleck / Joker**	
**2019** (73rd)	Leonardo DiCaprio	Once Upon a Time in Hollywood	Rick Dalton	
**2019** (73rd)	Adam Driver	Marriage Story	Charlie Barber	
**2019** (73rd)	Taron Egerton	Rocketman	Elton John	
**2019** (73rd)	Jonathan Pryce	The Two Popes	Cardinal Jorge Mario Bergoglio	

=== 2020s ===
Year	Actor	Films	Role (s)	Ref.
**2020** (74th)	**Anthony Hopkins** †	**The Father**	**Anthony**	
**2020** (74th)	Riz Ahmed	Sound of Metal	Ruben Stone	
**2020** (74th)	Chadwick Boseman (posthumous)	Ma Rainey's Black Bottom	Levee Green	
**2020** (74th)	Adarsh Gourav	The White Tiger	Balram Halwai	
**2020** (74th)	Mads Mikkelsen	Another Round	Martin	
**2020** (74th)	Tahar Rahim	The Mauritanian	Mohamedou Ould Slahi	
**2021** (75th)	**Will Smith** †	**King Richard**	**Richard Williams**	
**2021** (75th)	Adeel Akhtar	Ali & Ava	Ali	
**2021** (75th)	Mahershala Ali	Swan Song	Cameron Turner	
**2021** (75th)	Benedict Cumberbatch	The Power of the Dog	Phil Burbank	
**2021** (75th)	Leonardo DiCaprio	Don't Look Up	Dr. Randall Mindy	
**2021** (75th)	Stephen Graham	Boiling Point	Andy Jones	
**2022** (76th)	**Austin Butler**	**Elvis**	**Elvis Presley**	
**2022** (76th)	Colin Farrell	The Banshees of Inisherin	Pádraic Súilleabháin	
**2022** (76th)	Brendan Fraser †	The Whale	Charlie	
**2022** (76th)	Daryl McCormack	Good Luck to You, Leo Grande	Leo Grande / Connor	
**2022** (76th)	Paul Mescal	Aftersun	Calum Patterson	
**2022** (76th)	Bill Nighy	Living	Rodney Williams	
**2023** (77th)	**Cillian Murphy** †	**Oppenheimer**	**J. Robert Oppenheimer**	
**2023** (77th)	Bradley Cooper	Maestro	Leonard Bernstein	
**2023** (77th)	Colman Domingo	Rustin	Bayard Rustin	
**2023** (77th)	Paul Giamatti	The Holdovers	Paul Hunham	
**2023** (77th)	Barry Keoghan	Saltburn	Oliver Quick	
**2023** (77th)	Teo Yoo	Past Lives	Jung Hae Sung	
**2024** (78th)	**Adrien Brody** †	**The Brutalist**	**László Tóth**	
**2024** (78th)	Timothée Chalamet	A Complete Unknown	Bob Dylan	
**2024** (78th)	Colman Domingo	Sing Sing	John "Divine G" Whitfield	
**2024** (78th)	Ralph Fiennes	Conclave	Thomas Cardinal Lawrence	
**2024** (78th)	Hugh Grant	Heretic	Mr. Reed	
**2024** (78th)	Sebastian Stan	The Apprentice	Donald Trump	
**2025** (79th)	**Robert Aramayo**	**I Swear**	**John Davidson**	
**2025** (79th)	Timothée Chalamet	Marty Supreme	Marty Mauser	
**2025** (79th)	Leonardo DiCaprio	One Battle After Another	Bob Ferguson	
**2025** (79th)	Ethan Hawke	Blue Moon	Lorenz Hart	
**2025** (79th)	Jesse Plemons	Bugonia	Teddy Gatz	
**2025** (79th)	Michael B. Jordan †	Sinners	Elijah "Smoke" Moore / Elias "Stack" Moore	

== Multiple nominations ==
7 nominations

- Michael Caine
- Daniel Day-Lewis
- Leonardo DiCaprio
- Peter Finch
- Dustin Hoffman
- Jack Lemmon
- Laurence Olivier

6 nominations

- Marlon Brando
- Albert Finney
- Sidney Poitier

5 nominations

- Dirk Bogarde
- Robert De Niro
- Ralph Fiennes
- Anthony Hopkins
- Spencer Tracy

4 nominations

- Tom Hanks
- Jack Hawkins
- Trevor Howard
- Kenneth More
- Paul Newman
- Peter Sellers

3 nominations

- Woody Allen
- Richard Attenborough
- Richard Burton
- Timothée Chalamet
- George Clooney
- Bradley Cooper
- Tom Courtenay
- Russell Crowe
- Alec Guinness
- Gene Hackman
- Burt Lancaster
- Fredric March
- Walter Matthau
- Viggo Mortensen
- Jack Nicholson
- Gary Oldman
- Peter O'Toole
- Sean Penn
- Joaquin Phoenix
- Kevin Spacey

2 nominations

- Christian Bale
- Alan Bates
- Warren Beatty
- Jamie Bell
- Jean-Paul Belmondo
- Jeff Bridges
- Jim Broadbent
- Adrien Brody
- Nicolas Cage
- Sean Connery
- Benedict Cumberbatch
- Tony Curtis
- James Dean
- Gérard Depardieu
- Johnny Depp
- Colman Domingo
- Michael Douglas
- Richard Dreyfuss
- Michael Fassbender
- Colin Firth
- Henry Fonda
- Pierre Fresnay
- Jean Gabin
- John Gielgud
- Hugh Grant
- Jake Gyllenhaal
- George Hamilton
- Laurence Harvey
- William Holden
- Bob Hoskins
- Charles Laughton
- James Mason
- Marcello Mastroianni
- Ian McKellen
- John Mills
- Yves Montand
- Al Pacino
- Gregory Peck
- Brad Pitt
- Jonathan Pryce
- Anthony Quinn
- Michael Redgrave
- Eddie Redmayne
- Ralph Richardson
- Geoffrey Rush
- George C. Scott
- Martin Sheen
- Takashi Shimura
- Frank Sinatra
- Rod Steiger
- James Stewart
- Robin Williams
- Nicol Williamson
- Donald Wolfit

== Multiple wins ==
5 wins

- Peter Finch (2 consecutive)

4 wins

- Daniel Day-Lewis

3 wins

- Marlon Brando (consecutive)
- Anthony Hopkins
- Jack Lemmon (2 consecutive)

2 wins

- Dirk Bogarde
- Colin Firth (consecutive)
- Dustin Hoffman
- Burt Lancaster
- Marcello Mastroianni (consecutive)
- Jack Nicholson
- Rod Steiger

== Superlatives ==
Superlative	Best Actor		Best Supporting Actor		Overall (including Most Promising Newcomer)	
Actor with most awards	Peter Finch	5	Denholm Elliott	3	Peter Finch	5
Actor with most British Actor Awards (until 1967)	Peter Finch	3	—	—	Peter Finch	3
Actor with most Foreign Actor Awards (until 1967)	Marlon Brando	3	—	—	Marlon Brando	3
Actor with most nominations	Daniel Day-Lewis; Dustin Hoffman	7	Denholm Elliott	7	Albert Finney	9
Actor with most British Actor Award nominations (until 1967)	Laurence Olivier	6	—	—	Laurence Olivier	6
Actor with most Foreign Actor Award nominations (until 1967)	Sidney Poitier	6	—	—	Sidney Poitier	6

== See also ==
- Academy Award for Best Actor
- Actor Award for Outstanding Performance by a Male Actor in a Leading Role
- Best Actor
- Critics' Choice Movie Award for Best Actor
- Golden Globe Award for Best Actor in a Motion Picture – Drama
- Golden Globe Award for Best Actor in a Motion Picture – Musical or Comedy
- Independent Spirit Award for Best Lead Performance
- Lists of acting awards
- List of film awards for lead actor

== Notes ==
A^{1} ^{2} ^{3} ^{4} ^{5} ^{6} ^{7} ^{8} ^{9} ^{10} ^{11} ^{12} ^{13} ^{14} ^{15} ^{16} ^{17} ^{18} ^{19} ^{20} ^{21} : Rules from the 1960s to the 1970s allowed for a performer to receive a single citation which could honor their work in more than one film. Richard Attenborough, Peter Sellers, Lee Marvin, Jack Lemmon, Richard Burton, Dirk Bogarde, Dustin Hoffman, Walter Matthau, Elliott Gould, Gene Hackman, Marlon Brando, George C. Scott, Donald Sutherland, Jack Nicholson, and Al Pacino were all nominated for their roles in two different films in the same category, while Ralph Richardson and Robert Redford were both nominated for three films. Matthau received dual nominations three times, with Hackman and Hoffman both accomplishing this feat twice.
B^{1} ^{2} : Michael Caine and Dustin Hoffman received the same number of votes, resulting in both actors receiving the award, according to Academy rules.
