= 73rd Tony Awards =

2019 US theatrical awards ceremony

- Official poster
- Date: June 9, 2019
- Location: Radio City Music Hall, Midtown Manhattan, New York City
- Hosted by: James Corden

Highlights
- Most wins: Hadestown (8)
- Most nominations: Hadestown (14)
- Website: tonyawards.com

Television/radio coverage
- Network: CBS
- Viewership: 5.4 million
- Produced by: James Corden; Ricky Kirshner; Glenn Weiss; Ben Winston
- Directed by: Glenn Weiss

The 73rd Annual Tony Awards were held on June 9, 2019, to recognize achievement in Broadway productions during the 2018–19 season. The ceremony was held at Radio City Music Hall in New York City and was broadcast live by CBS. James Corden served as host.

Hadestown was the most awarded show of the season, with eight including Best Musical. The Ferryman won four awards, including Best Play. Musicals The Cher Show and Tootsie, the revival of Rodgers and Hammerstein's Oklahoma!, and the new play Ink each won two awards.

The ceremony received mixed reviews, with many criticizing the performance of Corden as host. At the 72nd Primetime Emmy Awards, it was nominated for three awards: Outstanding Variety Special (Live), Outstanding Directing for a Variety Special, and Outstanding Lighting Design / Lighting Direction for a Variety Special.

== Eligibility ==
The official eligibility cut-off date for Broadway productions opening in the 2018–2019 season was April 25, 2019. 34 shows were eligible.

Original plays

- American Son
- Bernhardt/Hamlet
- Choir Boy
- The Ferryman
- Gary: A Sequel to Titus Andronicus
- Hillary and Clinton
- Ink
- The Lifespan of a Fact
- The Nap
- Network
- The New One
- Straight White Men
- To Kill a Mockingbird
- What the Constitution Means to Me

Original musicals

- Ain't Too Proud
- Beetlejuice
- Be More Chill
- The Cher Show
- Gettin' the Band Back Together
- Hadestown
- Head Over Heels
- King Kong
- Pretty Woman: The Musical
- The Prom
- Tootsie

Play revivals

- All My Sons
- The Boys in the Band
- Burn This
- King Lear
- Torch Song
- True West
- The Waverly Gallery

Musical revivals

- Kiss Me, Kate
- Oklahoma!

== Events ==
=== Nominations ===
The Tony Award nominations were announced on April 30, 2019 by Bebe Neuwirth and Brandon Victor Dixon and broadcast on CBS.

Hadestown received 14 nominations, the most of any production of the season. Ain't Too Proud followed, with 12 nominations. The plays The Ferryman and To Kill a Mockingbird each received nine nominations.

=== Other events ===
The annual Meet the Nominees Press Reception took place on May 1, 2019 at the Sofitel New York Hotel. The annual Nominees Luncheon took place on May 21, 2019 at the Rainbow Room. A cocktail party was held on June 3, 2019 at the Sofitel New York Hotel to celebrate the season's Tony Honors for Excellence in the Theatre and Special Award recipients.

=== Creative Arts Awards ===
The Creative Arts Tony Awards ceremony was presented prior to the televised award ceremony. The ceremony was hosted by Danny Burstein, Karen Olivo and Aaron Tveit. The awards presented include honorary awards and technical categories.

== Ceremony ==
=== Presenters ===
The ceremony's presenters included:

- Tina Fey and Jake Gyllenhaal – presented Best Featured Actress in a Play
- Samira Wiley and Abigail Breslin – presented Best Featured Actor in a Play
- Samuel L. Jackson and LaTanya Richardson Jackson – presented Best Actress in a Play
- Jane Krakowski – introduced Tootsie
- Darren Criss and Sienna Miller – presented Best Featured Actor in a Musical
- Shirley Jones and Aasif Mandvi – introduced Oklahoma!
- Danai Gurira and Christopher Jackson – presented Best Direction of a Musical
- Catherine O'Hara – introduced Beetlejuice
- Lucy Liu – special presentation on the Tonys' history
- Laura Benanti and Anthony Ramos – presented Best Featured Actress in a Musical
- Kristin Chenoweth – introduced The Prom
- Michael Shannon and Marisa Tomei – presented Best Revival of a Play
- BeBe Winans – introduced Choir Boy
- Rachel Brosnahan and Jesse Tyler Ferguson – presented Best Direction of a Play
- Billy Porter – presented Excellence in Theatre Education Award
- David Byrne and Vanessa Carlton – presented Best Original Score
- Kelli O'Hara – introduced Kiss Me, Kate
- Sutton Foster and Andrew Rannells – presented Best Revival of a Musical
- Karen Olivo, Aaron Tveit, and Danny Burstein – presenters of the Creative Arts winners
- Regina King and Laura Linney – presented Best Actor in a Play
- Judith Light – presented Best Play
- Brian Stokes Mitchell – presenter of the In Memoriam tribute
- Ben Platt – presented Best Actor in a Musical
- Audra McDonald – presented Best Actress in a Musical
- Sara Bareilles and Josh Groban – presented Best Musical

=== Performances ===
The following shows and performers performed on the ceremony's telecast:

- "We Do It Live" – James Corden
- "Ain't Too Proud to Beg" / "Just My Imagination (Running Away with Me)" / "I Can't Get Next to You" – Ain't Too Proud
- "Unstoppable" – Tootsie
- "I Cain't Say No" / "Oklahoma" – Oklahoma!
- "Day-O (The Banana Boat Song)" / "The Whole Being Dead Thing" – Beetlejuice
- "Tonight Belongs to You" / "It's Time to Dance" – The Prom
- "James in the Bathroom" (parody of "Michael in the Bathroom" from Be More Chill – James Corden, Sara Bareilles, and Josh Groban, cameo by Neil Patrick Harris
- "Rockin' Jerusalem" – Choir Boy
- "Road to Hell" / "Wait For Me" – Hadestown
- "Too Darn Hot" – Kiss Me, Kate
- "Believe" – The Cher Show
- "Can You Feel the Love Tonight" – Cynthia Erivo

The playwrights of the nominated plays spoke of their work. As noted by The Hollywood Reporter "Presenting the play nominees has always been the telecast's biggest challenge, and having the writers themselves take the stage to discuss the genesis and themes of their work felt particularly appropriate in such an uncommonly strong season for new plays. It helped that they were so entertaining." The playwrights included James Graham (Ink), Jez Butterworth (The Ferryman), Tarell Alvin McCraney (Choir Boy), Taylor Mac (Gary: A Sequel to Titus Andronicus) and Heidi Schreck (What the Constitution Means to Me).

==== Broadway Karaoke ====
During the broadcast's commercial breaks, Corden started Broadway Karaoke, whereby Broadway performers in the audience would karaoke a show tune without preplanning or rehearsal. Equipped with a songbook, microphone, and with a pianist to accompany, Corden would pick various stars to sing during three of the telecast commercials. Although the performances weren't broadcast, audience members and Corden's own film crew recorded the proceedings with some videos being posted online. Corden, whose own late-night show has a successful and similar ongoing segment, Carpool Karaoke, which led to television's Carpool Karaoke: The Series, revealed the scheme on his show the following night of the Tonys.

The first of three karaokes was Dear Evan Hansen's Ben Platt who sang "Tomorrow" from Annie. During the next karaoke break was a performance of "96,000" from In the Heights by the upcoming film's Anthony Ramos who plays Usnavi, who was soon duetting with Christopher Jackson, who originated the role of Benny. The third performance was a "showstopper" shared by Corden on his show the next night, weaving online videos as well as from his own crew. Toward the end of the show he approached Pose's Billy Porter, who garnered media attention for his red and pink haute couture gown upcycled from Kinky Boots' curtains, to deliver what Corden said was an incredible performance of "Everything's Coming up Roses" from Gypsy, which received a standing ovation from the roughly 6,000 attendees.

== Non-competitive awards ==
The non-competitive Special Tony Award was presented to Rosemary Harris, Terrence McNally and Harold Wheeler for Lifetime Achievement in the Theatre.

The Isabelle Stevenson Award was awarded to Judith Light for her work to end HIV/AIDS and support for LGBTQ+ and human rights.

The Excellence In Theatre Education Award recipient was Madeleine Michel of Monticello High School in Charlottesville, Virginia.

The Regional Theatre Tony Award winner was TheatreWorks (Silicon Valley), Palo Alto, California.

The Tony Honors for Excellence in Theatre was awarded to Broadway Inspirational Voices; Peter Entin, retired vice president of Theatre Operations for the Shubert Organization; Joseph Blakely Forbes, founder and president of Scenic Art Studios, Inc.; and FDNY Engine 54, Ladder 4, Battalion 9 (firehouse, New York City).

Special Tony Awards were presented to the late Marin Mazzie, music director Jason Michael Webb, and Sonny Tilders and Creature Technology Company, creator of the gorilla in King Kong among others.

== Winners and nominees ==
| Best Play ‡ | Best Musical ‡ |
|---|---|
| The Ferryman – Jez Butterworth; Choir Boy – Tarell Alvin McCraney; Gary: A Sequel to Titus Andronicus – Taylor Mac; Ink – James Graham; What the Constitution Means to Me – Heidi Schreck | Hadestown; Ain't Too Proud; Beetlejuice; The Prom; Tootsie |
| Best Revival of a Play ‡ | Best Revival of a Musical ‡ |
| The Boys in the Band; All My Sons; Burn This; Torch Song; The Waverly Gallery | Oklahoma!; Kiss Me, Kate |
| Best Performance by a Leading Actor in a Play | Best Performance by a Leading Actress in a Play |
| Bryan Cranston – Network as Howard Beale; Paddy Considine – The Ferryman as Quinn Carney; Jeff Daniels – To Kill a Mockingbird as Atticus Finch; Adam Driver – Burn This as Pale; Jeremy Pope – Choir Boy as Pharus Jonathan Young | Elaine May – The Waverly Gallery as Gladys Green; Annette Bening – All My Sons as Kate Keller; Laura Donnelly – The Ferryman as Caitlin Carney; Janet McTeer – Bernhardt/Hamlet as Sarah Bernhardt; Laurie Metcalf – Hillary and Clinton as Hillary; Heidi Schreck – What the Constitution Means to Me as Heidi Schreck |
| Best Performance by a Leading Actor in a Musical | Best Performance by a Leading Actress in a Musical |
| Santino Fontana – Tootsie as Michael Dorsey / Dorothy Michaels; Brooks Ashmanskas – The Prom as Barry Glickman; Derrick Baskin – Ain't Too Proud as Otis Williams; Alex Brightman – Beetlejuice as Betelgeuse; Damon Daunno – Oklahoma! as Curly McLain | Stephanie J. Block – The Cher Show as Star; Caitlin Kinnunen – The Prom as Emma Nolan; Beth Leavel – The Prom as Dee Dee Allen; Eva Noblezada – Hadestown as Eurydice; Kelli O'Hara – Kiss Me, Kate as Lilli Vanessi / Katharine |
| Best Performance by a Featured Actor in a Play | Best Performance by a Featured Actress in a Play |
| Bertie Carvel – Ink as Rupert Murdoch; Robin de Jesús – The Boys in the Band as Emory; Gideon Glick – To Kill a Mockingbird as Dill Harris; Brandon Uranowitz – Burn This as Larry; Benjamin Walker – All My Sons as Chris Keller | Celia Keenan-Bolger – To Kill a Mockingbird as Scout Finch; Fionnula Flanagan – The Ferryman as Aunt Maggie Far Away; Kristine Nielsen – Gary: A Sequel to Titus Andronicus as Janice; Julie White – Gary: A Sequel to Titus Andronicus as Carol; Ruth Wilson – King Lear as Cordelia / Fool |
| Best Performance by a Featured Actor in a Musical | Best Performance by a Featured Actress in a Musical |
| André De Shields – Hadestown as Hermes; Andy Grotelueschen – Tootsie as Jeff Slater; Patrick Page – Hadestown as Hades; Jeremy Pope – Ain't Too Proud as Eddie Kendricks; Ephraim Sykes – Ain't Too Proud as David Ruffin | Ali Stroker – Oklahoma! as Ado Annie Carnes; Lilli Cooper – Tootsie as Julie Nichols; Amber Gray – Hadestown as Persephone; Sarah Stiles – Tootsie as Sandy Lester; Mary Testa – Oklahoma! as Aunt Eller |
| Best Direction of a Play | Best Direction of a Musical |
| Sam Mendes – The Ferryman; Rupert Goold – Ink; Bartlett Sher – To Kill a Mockingbird; Ivo van Hove – Network; George C. Wolfe – Gary: A Sequel to Titus Andronicus | Rachel Chavkin – Hadestown; Scott Ellis – Tootsie; Daniel Fish – Oklahoma!; Des McAnuff – Ain't Too Proud; Casey Nicholaw – The Prom |
| Best Book of a Musical | Best Original Score (Music and/or Lyrics) Written for the Theatre |
| Robert Horn – Tootsie; Dominique Morisseau – Ain't Too Proud; Scott Brown & Anthony King – Beetlejuice; Anaïs Mitchell – Hadestown; Chad Beguelin & Bob Martin – The Prom | Anaïs Mitchell – Hadestown; Joe Iconis – Be More Chill; Eddie Perfect – Beetlejuice; Chad Beguelin & Matthew Sklar – The Prom; Adam Guettel – To Kill a Mockingbird; David Yazbek – Tootsie |
| Best Scenic Design of a Play | Best Scenic Design of a Musical |
| Rob Howell – The Ferryman; Miriam Buether – To Kill a Mockingbird; Bunny Christie – Ink; Santo Loquasto – Gary: A Sequel to Titus Andronicus; Jan Versweyveld – Network | Rachel Hauck – Hadestown; Robert Brill and Peter Nigrini – Ain't Too Proud; Peter England – King Kong; Laura Jellinek – Oklahoma!; David Korins – Beetlejuice |
| Best Costume Design of a Play | Best Costume Design of a Musical |
| Rob Howell – The Ferryman; Toni-Leslie James – Bernhardt/Hamlet; Clint Ramos – Torch Song; Ann Roth – To Kill a Mockingbird; Ann Roth – Gary: A Sequel to Titus Andronicus | Bob Mackie – The Cher Show; Michael Krass – Hadestown; William Ivey Long – Tootsie; William Ivey Long – Beetlejuice; Paul Tazewell – Ain't Too Proud |
| Best Lighting Design of a Play | Best Lighting Design of a Musical |
| Neil Austin – Ink; Jules Fisher and Peggy Eisenhauer – Gary: A Sequel to Titus Andronicus; Peter Mumford – The Ferryman; Jennifer Tipton – To Kill a Mockingbird; Jan Versweyveld and Tal Yarden – Network | Bradley King – Hadestown; Kevin Adams – The Cher Show; Howell Binkley – Ain't Too Proud; Peter Mumford – King Kong; Kenneth Posner and Peter Nigrini – Beetlejuice |
| Best Sound Design of a Play | Best Sound Design of a Musical |
| Fitz Patton – Choir Boy; Adam Cork – Ink; Scott Lehrer – To Kill a Mockingbird; Nick Powell – The Ferryman; Eric Sleichim – Network | Nevin Steinberg and Jessica Paz – Hadestown; Peter Hylenski – King Kong; Peter Hylenski – Beetlejuice; Steve Canyon Kennedy – Ain't Too Proud; Drew Levy – Oklahoma! |
| Best Choreography | Best Orchestrations |
| Sergio Trujillo – Ain't Too Proud; Camille A. Brown – Choir Boy; Warren Carlyle – Kiss Me, Kate; Denis Jones – Tootsie; David Neumann – Hadestown | Michael Chorney and Todd Sickafoose – Hadestown; Simon Hale – Tootsie; Larry Hochman – Kiss Me, Kate; Daniel Kluger – Oklahoma!; Harold Wheeler – Ain't Too Proud |

‡ The award is presented to the producer(s) of the musical or play.

=== Nominations and awards per production ===
| Production | Nominations | Awards |
|---|---|---|
| Hadestown | 14 | 8 |
| Ain't Too Proud | 12 | 1 |
| Tootsie | 11 | 2 |
| The Ferryman | 9 | 4 |
| To Kill a Mockingbird | 9 | 1 |
| Oklahoma! | 8 | 2 |
| Beetlejuice | 8 | 0 |
| Gary: A Sequel to Titus Andronicus | 7 | 0 |
| The Prom | 7 | 0 |
| Ink | 6 | 2 |
| Network | 5 | 1 |
| Choir Boy | 4 | 1 |
| Kiss Me, Kate | 4 | 0 |
| The Cher Show | 3 | 2 |
| All My Sons | 3 | 0 |
| Burn This | 3 | 0 |
| King Kong | 3 | 0 |
| The Boys in the Band | 2 | 1 |
| The Waverly Gallery | 2 | 1 |
| Bernhardt/Hamlet | 2 | 0 |
| Torch Song | 2 | 0 |
| What the Constitution Means to Me | 2 | 0 |
| Be More Chill | 1 | 0 |
| Hillary and Clinton | 1 | 0 |
| King Lear | 1 | 0 |

==== Individuals with multiple nominations and awards ====
| Individual | Nominations | Awards |
|---|---|---|
| Rob Howell | 2 | 2 |
| Anaïs Mitchell | 2 | 1 |
| Chad Beguelin | 2 | 0 |
| Peter Hylenski | 2 | 0 |
| William Ivey Long | 2 | 0 |
| Peter Mumford | 2 | 0 |
| Peter Nigrini | 2 | 0 |
| Jeremy Pope | 2 | 0 |
| Ann Roth | 2 | 0 |
| Heidi Schreck | 2 | 0 |
| Jan Versweyveld | 2 | 0 |

== Reception ==
The show received a mixed reception from many media publications. On Metacritic, the ceremony has a weighted average score of 46 out of 100, based 6 reviews, indicating "mixed or average reviews". The Hollywood Reporter columnist David Rooney remarked, "The host started strong and had one sharp musical interlude mid-show, but elsewhere delivered strained comedy bits that felt familiar, safe and thematically generic." The New York Times theatre critic Mike Hale commented, "But after his verbal dexterity enlivened an overcrowded and bland opening number that did little to showcase the season's musicals, the material continually failed him, whether it was a tortured audience-participation gag about putting on a loser's face for the cameras, or a tortured audience-participation gag about generating some rap-style beefs between Broadway stars." Daniel D'Addario from Variety wrote, "The quality of showmanship — the simple sense of taking joy in a production having been brought across well — seemed painfully absent from a broadcast that has little other reason to exist. Many, many people who watch the Tonys never have seen and never will see a nominated show in Manhattan; for that audience, a production brought off well before the cameras is the ceremony's point vastly more than is a list of winners."

In addition, Caroline Siede from The A.V. Club gave the show a B−, expanding in her review, "All in all, this was a mostly satisfying, if not completely exhilarating year for the Tonys. I'll remember the winners and I'll remember some of the musical performances, but I doubt I'll remember James Corden's opening number in the way I still do with Neil Patrick Harris' "Bigger" or last year's Sara Bareilles and Josh Groban's tribute to losers." New York Post critic Michael Riedel wrote, "As for Corden, this was not his finest hour. The opening number, written especially for the telecast, was a dud, and he seemed a bit tired throughout the evening. There was a skit where he had Broadway actors dissing each other, and I can only hope he did not have script approval on that one." Theatre critic Charles McNulty of the Los Angeles Times remarked, "James Corden sprinkled in crowd-pleasing pokes at annoying audience members' phones ringing during shows, how expensive Broadway tickets have become and how low the industry's paychecks and the CBS telecast's ratings tend to be."

=== Be More Chill parody controversy ===
Of the ten nominated musicals, Be More Chill was the only one to not have a performance or segment on the telecast. Host Corden, with Josh Groban and Sara Bareilles, performed a parody of "Michael in the Bathroom", a song from the show. Joe Iconis, the show's composer and sole Tony nominee, praised the parody for giving the show exposure on a large scale, but the award ceremony was nevertheless criticized by fans for not crediting the source material. New York Post's Riedel noted Broadway League chief Charlotte St. Martin talked about the importance of getting young people to the theater, while the ceremony almost entirely ignored a show about teenagers whose target audience was mostly teenagers. The day after the ceremony, both Corden and Groban credited the show. St. Martin said, "We are doing everything we can to rectify [the situation]." CBS's Facebook post of the number was later revised to credit Iconis and Be More Chill as the parody's source.

=== Ratings ===
The ceremony averaged a Nielsen 4.3 ratings/8 share, and was watched by 5.4 million viewers. The ratings was a 10 percent decrease from previous ceremony's viewership of 6.3 million, becoming the lowest in its entire history.

== In Memoriam ==
Broadway actor Cynthia Erivo performed "Can You Feel the Love Tonight" from The Lion King as images of theatre personalities who died in the past year were shown in the following order.

- Marin Mazzie
- Carol Channing
- Alan Wasser
- Philip Bosco
- William Craver
- Merle Debuskey
- Georgia Engel
- Ralph Koltai
- Alvin Epstein
- Maria Irene Fornes
- Kaye Ballard
- Jerry Frankel
- William Goldman
- Barbara Harris
- Robert Kamlot
- Terry Allen Kramer
- Gary Beach
- Jo Sullivan Loesser
- Gillian Lynne
- Eric LaJuan Summers
- Galt MacDermot
- Joe Masteroff
- Vivian Matalon
- Harvey Sabinson
- Mark Medoff
- Shirley Prendergast
- Roger O. Hirson
- Carol Hall
- Donald Moffat
- Liliane Montevecchi
- Brian Murray
- Winston Ntshona
- Roger Robinson
- Ntozake Shange
- Carole Shelley
- Craig Zadan
- Glen Roven
- Charlotte Rae
- Albert Finney
- Neil Simon

== See also ==
- Drama Desk Awards
- 2019 Laurence Olivier Awards – equivalent awards for West End theatre productions
- Obie Award
- New York Drama Critics' Circle
- Theatre World Award
- Lucille Lortel Awards
