= 70th Tony Awards =

2016 US theatrical awards ceremony

- Official poster
- Date: June 12, 2016
- Location: Beacon Theatre, Manhattan, New York City
- Hosted by: James Corden

Highlights
- Most wins: Hamilton (11)
- Most nominations: Hamilton (16)
- Website: tonyawards.com

Television/radio coverage
- Network: CBS
- Viewership: 8.7 million
- Produced by: James Corden; Ricky Kirshner; Glenn Weiss; Ben Winston
- Directed by: Glenn Weiss

The 70th Annual Tony Awards were held on June 12, 2016, to recognize achievement in Broadway productions during the 2015–16 season. The ceremony temporarily returned to the Beacon Theatre in New York City after three years at Radio City Music Hall and was broadcast live by CBS. James Corden served as host.

Hamilton received a record-setting 16 nominations in 13 categories, ultimately winning 11 awards, the second-most for a single production in Tony history. The revival of The Color Purple won two awards. The Humans won four awards, and the revival productions of plays Long Day's Journey into Night and A View from the Bridge each won two awards.

The ceremony received positive reviews, with many highlighting the performance of Corden as host. At the 69th Primetime Emmy Awards, it won the Primetime Emmy Award for Outstanding Special Class Program, and was nominated for Outstanding Writing for a Variety Special, Outstanding Technical Direction, Camerawork, Video Control for a Limited Series, Movie, or Special and Outstanding Lighting Design / Lighting Direction for a Variety Special.

== Eligibility ==
Shows that opened on Broadway during the 2015–2016 season before April 28, 2016, were eligible for consideration.

Original plays

- An Act of God
- China Doll
- Eclipsed
- The Father
- The Humans
- King Charles III
- Misery
- Our Mother's Brief Affair
- Thérèse Raquin

Original musicals

- Allegiance
- Amazing Grace
- American Psycho
- Bright Star
- Disaster!
- Hamilton
- On Your Feet!
- School of Rock
- Shuffle Along
- Tuck Everlasting
- Waitress

Play revivals

- Blackbird
- The Crucible
- Fool for Love
- Fully Committed
- The Gin Game
- Hughie
- Long Day's Journey into Night
- Noises Off
- Old Times
- Sylvia
- A View from the Bridge

Musical revivals

- The Color Purple
- Dames at Sea
- Fiddler on the Roof
- She Loves Me
- Spring Awakening

== Awards events ==
=== Nominations ===
The Tony Award nominations were announced on May 3, 2016, by Nikki M. James and Andrew Rannells.

Hamilton garnered 16 nominations—the most received by any Broadway production to date. Following Hamilton, the season's most-nominated shows included Shuffle Along with 10 nominations and the Roundabout Theatre Company revival of She Loves Me with eight. The revival of Long Day's Journey into Night—also produced by Roundabout—received seven nominations. New plays Eclipsed and The Humans both received six nominations.

The 2015–16 season marked the first time since 1960 and the fourth time in history that five shows had been nominated for Best Musical.

=== Other events ===
The annual Meet the Nominees Press Reception took place on May 4, 2016, at the Paramount Hotel. The annual Nominees Luncheon took place on May 19, 2016, at the Paramount Hotel. A toast honoring the season's Creative Arts nominees was held at the Lambs Club on May 24, 2016. A private reception and cocktail party was held on June 6, 2016, at the Paramount Hotel's Diamond Horseshoe to honor the recipients of the season's Tony Honors for Excellence.

== Ceremony ==
The ceremony was dedicated in honor of the victims of the Orlando nightclub shooting, which had occurred earlier that morning. Corden addressed the shooting in a speech at the beginning of the telecast, stating "All we can say is that you are not on your own right now, your tragedy is our tragedy. Theater is a place where every race, creed, sexuality, and gender is equal, is embraced and is loved. Hate will never win." Winners Lin-Manuel Miranda and Frank Langella also addressed the shooting in their acceptance speeches. Miranda read a sonnet that he had written, which included the passage "Love is love is love is love is love is love is love is love; Cannot be killed or swept aside." In respect toward the victims of the shooting, the cast of Hamilton dropped the use of muskets from their performance of "Yorktown (The World Turned Upside Down)" at the ceremony.

=== Presenters ===
The ceremony's presenters included:

- Jake Gyllenhaal – presented Best Featured Actress in a Play
- Andrew Lloyd Webber – introduced School of Rock
- Aaron Tveit and Mary Elizabeth Winstead – presented Best Featured Actress in a Musical
- Patina Miller and Daniel Dae Kim – presented Best Featured Actor in a Musical
- Carole King – presented Best Original Score
- Meg Ryan – introduced She Loves Me
- Jesse Tyler Ferguson and Lucy Liu – presented Best Direction of a Play and Best Direction of a Musical
- Josh Groban – introduced Fiddler on the Roof
- Andrew Rannells and Saoirse Ronan – presented Best Featured Actor in a Play
- Steve Martin and Edie Brickell – introduced Bright Star
- Oprah Winfrey – introduced The Color Purple
- James Earl Jones and Angela Lansbury – special presentation on the Tonys history
- Nathan Lane – presented Best Actress in a Play
- Emilio Estefan – introduced On Your Feet!
- Cate Blanchett – presented Best Actor in a Play
- Marlee Matlin – presented Spring Awakening
- Diane Lane – presented Best Revival of a Play
- Blair Underwood – presented Excellence in Theatre Education Award
- Barack Obama, Michelle Obama and Common – introduced Hamilton
- Christian Borle and Nikki M. James – presenters of the Creative Arts winners
- Claire Danes – presented Best Play
- Keri Russell – introduced Waitress
- Bebe Neuwirth – tribute to Chicago
- Sean Hayes and Uzo Aduba – presented Best Revival of a Musical
- Chita Rivera – presenter of the In Memoriam tribute
- Neil Patrick Harris – presented Best Actor in a Musical
- Audra McDonald – presented Best Actress in a Musical
- Barbra Streisand – presented Best Musical

=== Performances ===
The following shows and performers performed on the ceremony's telecast:

- "This Could Be You" – James Corden
- "You're In The Band" – School of Rock
- "Broadway Blues" – Shuffle Along
- "Ilona" / "She Loves Me" / "Vanilla Ice Cream" – She Loves Me
- "Sunrise, Sunset" / "The Wedding Dance" – Fiddler on the Roof
- "If You Knew My Story" – Bright Star (Steve Martin and Edie Brickell appeared with the company)
- "Mysterious Ways" / "I'm Here" – The Color Purple
- "Mega Mix" ("Rhythm is Gonna Get You" / "Conga" / "Oye" / "Turn the Beat Around" / "Everlasting Love" / "Get on Your Feet") – On Your Feet! (Gloria Estefan performed with the company)
- Broadway Carpool Karaoke ("On Broadway" / "Alexander Hamilton/Guns and Ships" / "Seasons of Love" / "Can't Take My Eyes Off You" / "One Day More") – James Corden, Lin-Manuel Miranda, Audra McDonald, Jesse Tyler Ferguson, and Jane Krakowski
- "Mama Who Bore Me" / "The Bitch of Living" – Spring Awakening
- "History Has Its Eyes on You" / "Yorktown (The World Turned Upside Down)" – Hamilton
- "Opening Up" / "She Used to Be Mine" – Waitress (Sara Bareilles performed with the company)
- "The Schuyler Sisters" – Hamilton

Performances that were introduced by individuals who had a relationship with the show included: Steve Martin and Edie Brickell for Bright Star; Oprah Winfrey for The Color Purple; Josh Groban for Fiddler on the Roof; Emilio Estefan for On Your Feet!; Andrew Lloyd Webber for School of Rock; Meg Ryan for She Loves Me; Marlee Matlin for Spring Awakening; and Keri Russell for Waitress. President Obama and Michelle Obama, in a recorded appearance, spoke of seeing the beginnings of Hamilton at the White House. The ceremony also featured a special tribute performance in honor of the 20-year anniversary of the revival production of the musical Chicago, featuring Bebe Neuwirth and company.

The opening number, “That Could Be Me/This Could Be You,” was created by host Corden and Gary Barlow, consisting of snippets from many musicals with Corden and the ensemble replicating shows such as Les Misérables, The Lion King, and ending with 42nd Street. During the ceremony, outside the Beacon Theatre, cast members of nominated shows and other nominees performed brief performance excerpts of iconic shows in the Broadway canon, ranging from The Phantom of the Opera to Annie to Rent. The show closed with the cast of Hamilton performing "The Schuyler Sisters".

== Non-competitive awards ==
The 2016 Tony Honors for Excellence were awarded to voice coach Joan Lader, attorney Seth Gelblum, and Sally Ann Parsons, owner of the costume shop Parsons-Meares. Lyricist Sheldon Harnick and Circle Repertory Company founder Marshall W. Mason received Special Tony Awards for Lifetime Achievement. The National Endowment for the Arts and Miles Wilkin, COO and executive vice president of Key Brand Entertainment, received the season's Special Tony Awards. Paper Mill Playhouse in Millburn, New Jersey received the Regional Theatre Tony Award. Brian Stokes Mitchell was named as recipient of the Isabelle Stevenson Award for his work with the Actors Fund. The season's Excellence in Theatre Education Award was awarded to drama teacher Marilyn McCormick of Cass Technical High School in Detroit.

== Winners and nominees ==
Sources: Playbill; The New York Times; The Guardian

Best Play ‡	Best Musical ‡
The Humans – Stephen Karam; Eclipsed – Danai Gurira; The Father – Florian Zeller; King Charles III – Mike Bartlett	Hamilton; Bright Star; School of Rock; Shuffle Along, or, the Making of the Musical Sensation of 1921 and All That Followed; Waitress
Best Revival of a Play ‡	Best Revival of a Musical ‡
A View from the Bridge; Blackbird; The Crucible; Long Day's Journey Into Night; Noises Off	The Color Purple; Fiddler on the Roof; She Loves Me; Spring Awakening
Best Actor in a Play	Best Actress in a Play
Frank Langella – The Father as Andre; Gabriel Byrne – Long Day's Journey into Night as James Tyrone; Jeff Daniels – Blackbird as Ray Brooks; Tim Pigott-Smith – King Charles III as Charles; Mark Strong – A View from the Bridge as Eddie Carbone	Jessica Lange – Long Day's Journey into Night as Mary Tyrone; Laurie Metcalf – Misery as Annie Wilkes; Lupita Nyong'o – Eclipsed as The Girl; Sophie Okonedo – The Crucible as Elizabeth Proctor; Michelle Williams – Blackbird as Una Spencer
Best Actor in a Musical	Best Actress in a Musical
Leslie Odom Jr. – Hamilton as Aaron Burr; Alex Brightman – School of Rock as Dewey Finn; Danny Burstein – Fiddler on the Roof as Tevye; Zachary Levi – She Loves Me as Georg Nowack; Lin-Manuel Miranda – Hamilton as Alexander Hamilton	Cynthia Erivo – The Color Purple as Celie Harris Johnson; Laura Benanti – She Loves Me as Amalia Balash; Carmen Cusack – Bright Star as Alice Murphy; Jessie Mueller – Waitress as Jenna Hunterson; Phillipa Soo – Hamilton as Eliza Hamilton
Best Featured Actor in a Play	Best Featured Actress in a Play
Reed Birney – The Humans as Erik Blake; Bill Camp – The Crucible as Reverend John Hale; David Furr – Noises Off as Gary Lejeune; Richard Goulding – King Charles III as Prince Harry; Michael Shannon – Long Day's Journey into Night as James Tyrone Jr.	Jayne Houdyshell – The Humans as Deirdre Blake; Pascale Armand – Eclipsed as Wife #3; Megan Hilty – Noises Off as Brooke Ashton; Andrea Martin – Noises Off as Dotty Otley; Saycon Sengbloh – Eclipsed as Wife #1
Best Featured Actor in a Musical	Best Featured Actress in a Musical
Daveed Diggs – Hamilton as Marquis de Lafayette / Thomas Jefferson; Brandon Victor Dixon – Shuffle Along as Eubie Blake; Christopher Fitzgerald – Waitress as Ogie; Jonathan Groff – Hamilton as King George III; Christopher Jackson – Hamilton as George Washington	Renée Elise Goldsberry – Hamilton as Angelica Schuyler; Danielle Brooks – The Color Purple as Sofia Johnson; Jane Krakowski – She Loves Me as Ilona Ritter; Jennifer Simard – Disaster! as Sister Mary Downy; Adrienne Warren – Shuffle Along as Gertrude Saunders / Florence Mills
Best Book of a Musical	Best Original Score (Music and/or Lyrics) Written for the Theatre
Hamilton – Lin-Manuel Miranda; Bright Star – Steve Martin; School of Rock – Julian Fellowes; Shuffle Along – George C. Wolfe	Hamilton – Lin-Manuel Miranda (music and lyrics); Bright Star – Edie Brickell (music and lyrics) and Steve Martin (music); School of Rock – Andrew Lloyd Webber (music) and Glenn Slater (lyrics); Waitress – Sara Bareilles (music and lyrics)
Best Scenic Design of a Play	Best Scenic Design of a Musical
David Zinn – The Humans; Beowulf Boritt – Thérèse Raquin; Christopher Oram – Hughie; Jan Versweyveld – A View from the Bridge	David Rockwell – She Loves Me; Es Devlin and Finn Ross – American Psycho; David Korins – Hamilton; Santo Loquasto – Shuffle Along
Best Costume Design of a Play	Best Costume Design of a Musical
Clint Ramos – Eclipsed; Jane Greenwood – Long Day's Journey into Night; Michael Krass – Noises Off; Tom Scutt – King Charles III	Paul Tazewell – Hamilton; Gregg Barnes – Tuck Everlasting; Jeff Mahshie – She Loves Me; Ann Roth – Shuffle Along
Best Lighting Design of a Play	Best Lighting Design of a Musical
Natasha Katz – Long Day's Journey into Night; Justin Townsend – The Humans; Jan Versweyveld – The Crucible; Jan Versweyveld – A View from the Bridge	Howell Binkley – Hamilton; Jules Fisher and Peggy Eisenhauer – Shuffle Along; Ben Stanton – Spring Awakening; Justin Townsend – American Psycho
Best Direction of a Play	Best Direction of a Musical
Ivo van Hove – A View from the Bridge; Rupert Goold – King Charles III; Jonathan Kent – Long Day's Journey into Night; Joe Mantello – The Humans; Liesl Tommy – Eclipsed	Thomas Kail – Hamilton; Michael Arden – Spring Awakening; John Doyle – The Color Purple; Scott Ellis – She Loves Me; George C. Wolfe – Shuffle Along
Best Choreography	Best Orchestrations
Andy Blankenbuehler – Hamilton; Savion Glover – Shuffle Along; Hofesh Shechter – Fiddler on the Roof; Randy Skinner – Dames at Sea; Sergio Trujillo – On Your Feet!	Alex Lacamoire – Hamilton; August Eriksmoen – Bright Star; Larry Hochman – She Loves Me; Daryl Waters – Shuffle Along

‡ The award is presented to the producer(s) of the musical or play.

=== Awards and nominations per production ===
Production	Nominations	Awards
Hamilton	16	11
Shuffle Along	10	0
She Loves Me	8	1
Long Day's Journey into Night	7	2
The Humans	6	4
Eclipsed	6	1
A View from the Bridge	5	2
Bright Star	5	0
King Charles III	5	0
Noises Off	5	0
The Color Purple	4	2
The Crucible	4	0
School of Rock	4	0
Waitress	4	0
Blackbird	3	0
Fiddler on the Roof	3	0
Spring Awakening	3	0
The Father	2	1
American Psycho	2	0
Dames at Sea	1	0
Disaster!	1	0
Hughie	1	0
Misery	1	0
On Your Feet!	1	0
Thérèse Raquin	1	0
Tuck Everlasting	1	0

==== Individuals with multiple nominations ====
- 3: Lin-Manuel Miranda; Jan Versweyveld
- 2: Steve Martin; Justin Townsend; George C. Wolfe

== Reception ==
The show received a positive reception from media publications. Some media outlets received the broadcast more positively with praise for Corden and how he dealt with the Orlando nightclub shooting. The Hollywood Reporter columnist David Rooney remarked, "In terms of Corden's overall performance as host, it was very much in line with his Late Late Show monologues — sweet and upbeat, if not the least bit risky or cutting-edge. Despite the inevitable longueurs that set in as the evening wore on, for the most part he kept the show moving briskly with affable appearances to paper the gaps." Television critic Robert Lloyd of the Los Angeles Times remarked, "Where Neil Patrick Harris, who once seemed to have permanent first-refusal rights on the job, is a cool cat, Corden is a ball of energy, a big dog that won't stop licking your face; but it is a style that works for him." The New York Times theatre critic Charles Isherwood commented, "Was a bit jarring moving to comedy, but Mr. Corden is such a genial presence."

In addition, Maureen Ryan from Variety wrote, "Corden was an energetic host, even if the opening number meant to showcase his lifelong love of theater felt as though it went on a little long. There was also the inevitable Carpool Karaoke number. Corden was an affable host, and his opening remarks on Orlando were short but effective." Frazier Moore of the Rolling Stone wrote, "On a night that was marked by tragedy — and occurring mere hours after news broke of the deadly mass shooting in Orlando, Florida — the Tonys provided a much-needed bit of levity. The performers and honorees didn't shy away from speaking about the shocking events of the day, but the overall mood was one of celebration. Part of the credit goes to the master of ceremonies James Corden, best known as the goofy host CBS's Late Late Show, yet still a dorky theater kid at heart; his charming, cheerful persona brought an upbeat mood to the proceedings." The Washington Post theatre critic Peter Marks gave high marks toward Corden saying, "Corden served for the first time Sunday night as host of the Tony Awards and, as a result, ushered in a completely pleasurable Era of Good Feeling for an awards ceremony, and an industry, badly in need of one."

=== Ratings ===
The ceremony averaged a Nielsen 6.8 ratings/11 share, and was watched by 8.7 million viewers. The ratings was a 33 percent increase from previous ceremony's viewership of 6.4 million, becoming the highest rating in over 15 years.

== In Memoriam ==
An orchestra was performing in the tribute as images of theatre personalities who died in the past year were shown in the following order.

- Doris Roberts
- Sir Peter Shaffer
- Billie Allen
- Arnold Wesker
- Patty Duke
- Anne Jackson
- Robert de Michiell
- Ken Howard
- Maureen O'Hara
- Michael White
- Biff Liff
- Brian Bedford
- Kyle Jean-Baptiste
- Brian Friel
- Patricia Elliott
- Richard Libertini
- Dean Jones
- Elizabeth Swados
- Alan Rickman
- David Margulies
- David Bowie
- Saeed Jaffrey
- Frank D. Gilroy
- Theodore Bikel
- Dick Van Patten
- Donald Seawell
- Roger Rees

== See also ==
- Drama Desk Awards
- 2016 Laurence Olivier Awards – equivalent awards for West End theatre productions
- Obie Award
- New York Drama Critics' Circle
- Theatre World Award
- Lucille Lortel Awards
