= Fountainhead (disambiguation) =

The Fountainhead is a 1943 novel by Ayn Rand.

Fountainhead may also refer to:

== Performing arts ==
- The Fountainhead (film), a 1949 movie based on Ayn Rand's novel
- The Fountainhead (play), a 2014 play based on Rand's novel

== Music ==
- The Fountainhead (band), an Irish rock band
- Fountainhead (album), a 1989 album by Andy LaVerne
- "Slight Return/The Fountainhead", a 1995 single by the Bluetones
- "Fountainhead (Unbound)", a song by Hands Like Houses from Unimagine
- "Fountainhead", a song by Echolyn from Echolyn

== Places ==
- Fountainhead School, a school in Surat, India
- Fountainhead (Jackson, Mississippi), a house designed by Frank Lloyd Wright
- Fountainhead-Orchard Hills, Maryland, a census-designated place
- Lake Eufaula State Park or Fountainhead State Park, a park in McIntosh County, Oklahoma
- Fountainhead Regional Park, a park in Fairfax County, Virginia
- Fountainhead Village, a hamlet in Calderdale, West Yorkshire, UK

== Other uses ==
- Fountainhead (yacht), a 2011 motor yacht
- Fountainhead Entertainment, a video game production company founded by Katherine Anna Kang
- Fountainhead Project, a proposed 32-bit computer by Data General

== See also ==
- Fountain (disambiguation)
- Hydraulic head
- River source
