= What the Constitution Means to Me =

Play written by Heidi Schreck

- Original language: English
- Written by: Heidi Schreck
- Subject: Constitution of the United States
- Genre: Comedy
- Setting: American Legion Hall in Wenatchee, Washington

Premiere
- Date: 2017
- Place: New York City

What the Constitution Means to Me is a 2017 American play by Heidi Schreck. The play premiered on Broadway on March 31, 2019 at the Hayes Theater, with Schreck herself in the leading role. Over the course of the play, Schreck addresses themes such as women's rights, immigration, domestic abuse, and the history of the United States. Schreck varies the time period in which the play takes place, performing some scenes as her modern self and others as her fifteen-year-old self participating in Constitutional debate contests. What the Constitution Means to Me has received accolades such as a nomination for Best Play in the 73rd Tony Awards and a finalist spot for the 2019 Pulitzer Prize for Drama.

== Overview ==
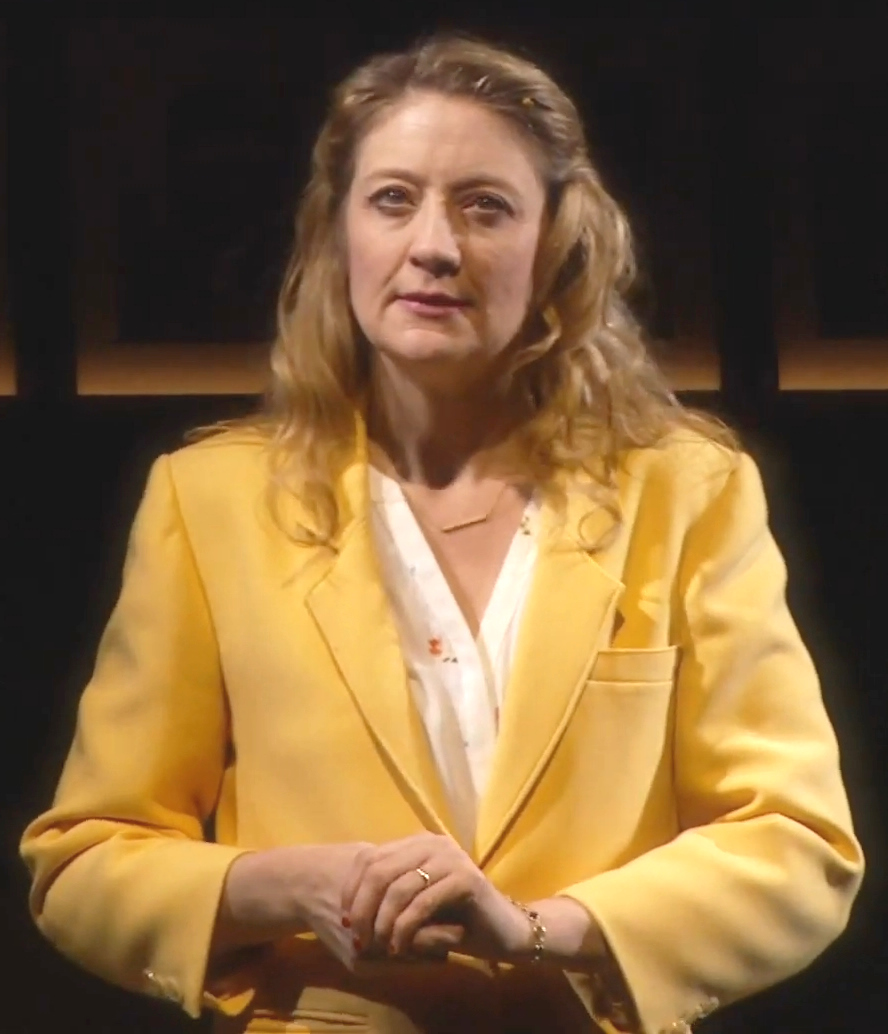
Heidi Schreck performs a portion from What the Constitution Means to Me at the 73rd Tony Awards in 2019

Heidi Schreck begins the play by communicating her story to the audience through the lens of both herself in the present and narrating her performance of her fifteen-year-old self as a Constitutional debater in 1989, when she gave speeches on what the Constitution of the United States meant to her in order to win prize money for college. Pictures of men on the walls and a WWII veteran onstage represent the competitions' judges and moderator. Schreck talks about multiple facets of the Constitution throughout the play, but discourse about the Ninth Amendment—which Schreck refers to as the "penumbra" of the Constitution, quoting former Supreme Court Justice William O. Douglas—is central to the show. She also includes a deep dive into the Fourteenth Amendment of the Constitution, which discusses citizenship rights and what it means to be "American".

Schreck also addresses themes of sexual assault, domestic abuse, and immigration as they relate to the women in her family, to herself, and to others related to significant legal cases in American history. She shares her own experience in getting an abortion when she was in her 20s and fearing sexual assault during college. Schreck discusses the abuse of her mother and her grandmother, Bette, by Bette's husband. She also includes the story of her great-great-grandmother, who in 1879 was sent from her home country of Germany to Washington state after being purchased from a catalogue by her future husband. Shreck's great-great-grandmother was eventually admitted to a mental hospital for “melancholia” and died at the age of 36.

Schreck highlights what she now sees as the pitfalls of the Constitution. Mainly, she argues that the Constitution does not protect all Americans because it was not created to protect all Americans—it is largely concerned with negative rights and not limiting the actions of white men. Actor Mike Iveson moves out of his role of the WWII veteran and shares his own experience in regards to his sexuality and experience with masculinity. The play ends with a dialogue, moderated by Iveson, in which Schreck engages with a local high school debater on whether or not the U.S. Constitution should be abolished and replaced; this debate and its conclusion were unique to each live performance. The audience plays the role of the jury in this debate, with one audience member being selected to deliver a final verdict.

== Productions ==
What the Constitution Means to Me was first produced at the Wild Project, in Summerworks, Clubbed Thumb's (New York City) festival for new plays in June to July 2017 in a co-production with True Love Productions. Schreck was contracted by True Love Productions in their new play commissioning program, writing What the Constitution Means to Me for her submission.

The play was presented at Berkeley Repertory Theatre, California, from May 3, 2018 to June 17, 2018 with direction by Oliver Butler. Schreck starred, with Danny Wolohan as the moderator "Danny", and Anaya Naomi Matthews ("Anaya") and Wisdom Kunitz ("Wisdom") rotating the role of the featured high school debater. Chris Ginesi understudied "Danny".

An Off-Broadway production of the play premiered at the New York Theatre Workshop on September 12, 2018 and closed there on November 4, 2018 (in an extension of one week), before moving to the Greenwich House on November 27, 2018 where it closed on December 30, 2018. The play was again directed by Oliver Butler, and the cast featured Heidi Schreck, along with Mike Iveson as the moderator, and Rosdely Ciprian and Thursday Williams as the play's featured high school debaters.

A limited Broadway run of the play began on March 14, 2019 in previews at the Hayes Theatre, with the official premiere on March 31. The run was extended to July 21, 2019. Directed again by Oliver Butler, the cast features Heidi Schreck, Mike Iveson, Rosdely Ciprian, Thursday Williams, and Ben Beckley. The production's Broadway run was again extended in April 2019 to a final closing date of August 24, 2019.

An engagement of the play, starring Schreck, took place at Washington D.C.'s Kennedy Center (Eisenhower Theater) from September 11, 2019 to September 22, 2019.

The play ran at the Mark Taper Forum in Los Angeles from January 12, 2020 to February 28, 2020, and then at Chicago's Broadway Playhouse March 4, 2020 to April 12, 2020 (closed prematurely due to the COVID-19 pandemic). This tour featured a new leading lady, taking the starring role that Schreck has performed. Maria Dizzia played the main part at the Los Angeles and Chicago venues. The text has been tweaked to reflect the fact that Dizzia is not Heidi, but only playing her.

The show became the first straight play to tour after the beginning of the COVID-19 pandemic, beginning at the Guthrie Theater in Minneapolis and continuing to cities including Detroit, Boston, and Madison. This tour was led by Cassie Beck.

On September 17, 2020, it was announced that the play would premiere on October 16, 2020 on Amazon Prime Video, having been filmed by Marielle Heller.

== Creation ==
Schreck first thought about generating a play like What the Constitution Means to Me in the 1990s. The first iteration of the play came in the form of a short 10-minute presentation that Schreck performed at benefits nearly ten years after her initial idea for the show. Although the premise of the play is based on Schreck's own life, she did not initially set out to write a role for her to play; her initial motives included getting Americans to consider contemporary judicial issues through the lens of the Constitution itself, and to provide a grounds for conversation of those issues facing women today. When asked about the concept of victimhood in her play, Schreck stated, “…stories hold our cure.” Although the play seems to be improvised to a certain degree, Schreck sticks heavily to the letter of her script, adapting occasionally to integrate the most relevant contemporary references.

== Context ==
=== Town of Castle Rock v. Gonzales ===
Schreck describes the events leading to the case Town of Castle Rock v. Gonzales, in which a woman sued the town police department for repeatedly refusing to enforce a restraining order. Subsequently the woman's husband murdered their three daughters. Schreck describes the Supreme Court's extensive discussion of the meaning of the word shall , and the discussion's lack of focus on the tragedy itself. The Supreme Court's decision in this case is used to illustrate a central theme, the failure of the U.S. Constitution to protect women.

=== Supreme Court Justice Brett Kavanaugh ===
The play's discussion of women's rights seemed especially pertinent to audiences in 2018, in light of the then-ongoing U.S. Senate hearings to confirm Judge Brett Kavanaugh to the U.S. Supreme Court. In an article for The New York Times, Ben Brantley wrote, "Ms. Schreck's show… never mentions Mr. Kavanaugh by name. But his invisible judiciary presence is there, affirming many of her implicit arguments, which are often indistinguishable from her deepest fears about a document with which she has had a long and complicated relationship." Schreck noted that the percentage of audience members voting in favor of abolishing the Constitution during the vote at the play's end rose dramatically during the Kavanaugh hearings.

=== Women's issues ===
What the Constitution Means to Me also covers issues including women's equality and abortion, particularly through Schreck's own experience in getting an abortion and the stories of the abuse her mother, grandmother, great-grandmother, and other women in American history have faced from husbands and fathers. The play notes that women's issues, including abortion, are not mentioned in the U.S. Constitution at all.

=== Immigration ===
The play addresses themes of immigration as they relate to the history of Schreck's family, particularly her great-grandmother, who came to the U.S. after being purchased as a wife in a magazine. The idea of being a "good immigrant" is also included throughout the play; reviewers have noted the importance of this theme in parallel to President Donald Trump's anti-immigration rhetoric.

== Critical response ==
In reviewing the 2018 Off-Broadway production, Thom Geier of The Wrap wrote: "Schreck is an engaging storyteller with a delivery that seems improvised even when she is sticking to her winding but always-focused script. Again and again, she manages to imbue her exploration of the politics of constitutional rights from the lens of the personal. And of the individuals left out as Americans saw their rights expand."

Critic Sara Holdren wrote in New York Magazine that What the Constitution Means to Me is a "...brilliantly crafted show, harrowing and funny and humane, that accesses the political through the deeply personal."

Ben Brantley of The New York Times noted, "More artistic choice could have been taken in the production of the play; but the whirlwind, all-in-one-breath nature of the play echoes the feeling of desperation that permeates Schreck's storylines."

== Honors and awards ==
Year	Award	Category	Nominee	Result
2019	Lucille Lortel Awards	Outstanding Play (Off-Broadway)		Nominated
2019	Obie Awards	Best New American Play		Won
2019	Off-Broadway Alliance Awards	Best New Play		Won
2019	Drama League Awards	Outstanding Production of a Broadway or Off-Broadway Play		Nominated
2019	Drama League Awards	Distinguished Performance Award	Heidi Schreck	Nominated
2019	Outer Critics Circle Award	Outstanding New Broadway Play		Nominated
2019	New York Drama Critics' Circle	Best American Play		Won
2019	Drama Desk Awards	Outstanding Play		Nominated
2019	Drama Desk Awards	Outstanding Actress in a Play	Heidi Schreck	Nominated
2019	Tony Awards	Best Play		Nominated
2019	Tony Awards	Best Performance by a Leading Actress in a Play	Heidi Schreck	Nominated
2020	GLAAD Media Awards	Outstanding Broadway Production		Nominated
2021	Critics' Choice Television Awards	Best Television Movie		Nominated
2021	Directors Guild of America Awards	Outstanding Directorial Achievement in Variety/Talk/News/Sports – Specials	Marielle Heller	Nominated
2021	Producers Guild of America Awards	Outstanding Producer of Streamed or Televised Motion Pictures		Nominated

=== Pulitzer Prize ===
The play was a finalist for the 2019 Pulitzer Prize for Drama. The committee wrote: "A charming and incisive analysis of gender and racial biases inherent to the U.S. Constitution that examines how this living document could evolve to fit modern America."

=== Other ===
The play was named by Time Magazine in their 10 Best Theater Performances of 2019, as number 5. The magazine's comment: "Schreck is a wonderful comedic actor, and her timely explanation of the intent, flaws and meaning of the Constitution arrived on Broadway at the moment in our nation’s history when we needed it most."
