= The Fountainhead (play) =

Play by Ivo van Hove

- Cover of program for the 2014 Amsterdam production
- Original language: Dutch
- Written by: Ivo van Hove
- Based on: The Fountainhead by Ayn Rand

Premiere
- Date: 15 June 2014
- Place: Stadsschouwburg

The Fountainhead is a play written in 2014 by Belgian theatre director Ivo van Hove. It is an adaptation of the 1943 novel of the same name by Russian-born American author Ayn Rand. The story focuses on Howard Roark, an individualistic architect who designs modernist buildings and refuses to compromise with an architectural establishment unwilling to accept innovation. The production, running more than four hours, uses video projections to show close-ups of the actors and Roark's drawings, as well as backgrounds of the New York skyline.

Since its debut at the Holland Festival in June 2014, the play has received mostly positive reviews from European critics for productions in the Netherlands, France, Spain, and the United Kingdom. American critics gave mostly negative reviews to a production at the Brooklyn Academy of Music's Next Wave Festival in 2017.

== Plot ==
Howard Roark, a modernist architect who refuses to follow traditional styles, struggles to develop a successful career. He competes with rival architects Peter Keating and Guy Francon, who copy past buildings to achieve public acceptance. Roark has an affair with Francon's daughter Dominique, who later marries newspaper magnate Gail Wynand. Roark agrees to help Keating with the design of a housing project. When the terms of their agreement are broken, Roark demolishes the building and is prosecuted. Roark is acquitted, and Dominique leaves Wynand to be with Roark.

== Cast and characters ==
The characters and cast from the original Amsterdam production are listed below:

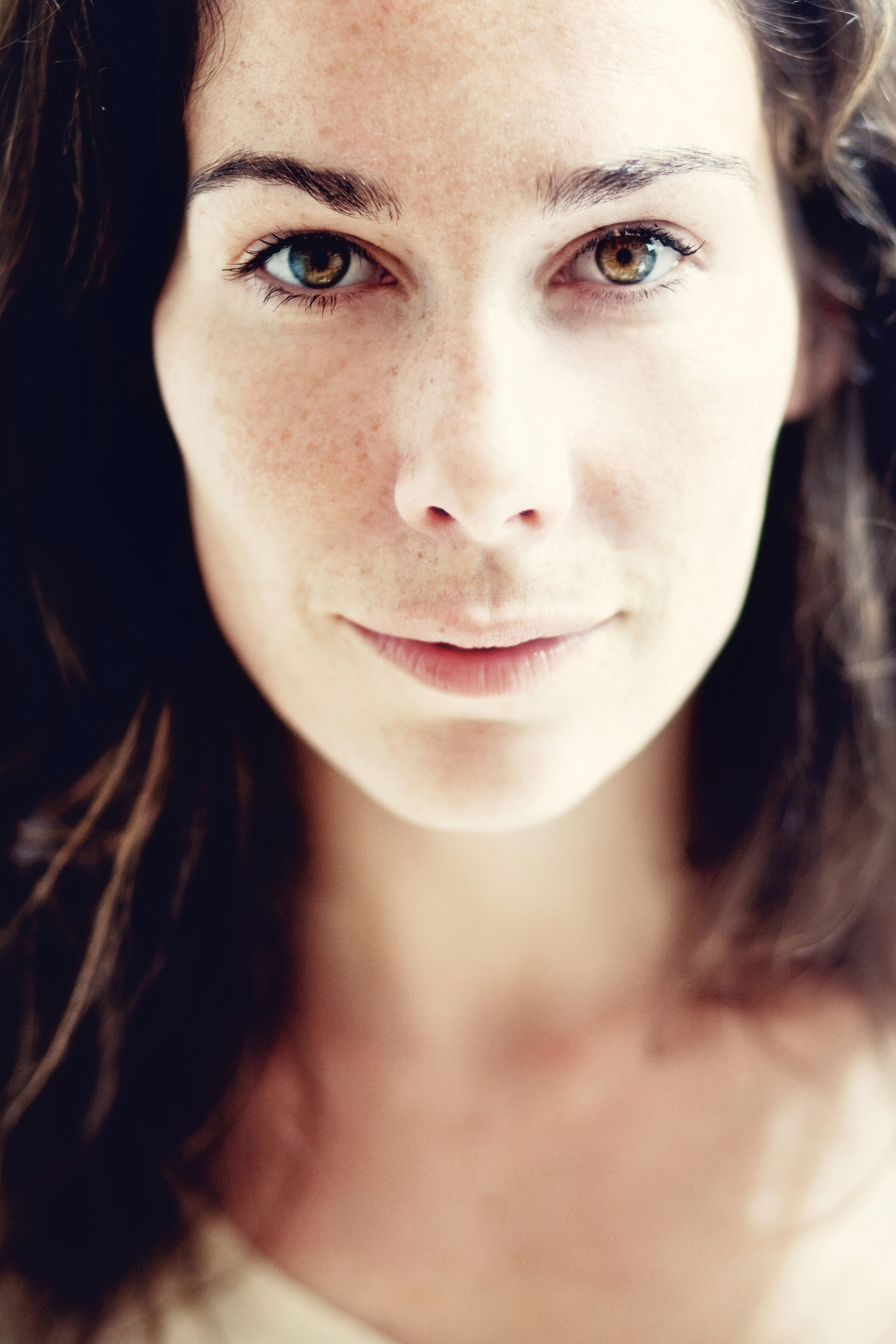
Halina Reijn played Dominque Francon in the premier production.

Cast of the Amsterdam production
Character	Cast
Howard Roark	Ramsey Nasr
Peter Keating	Aus Greidanus, Jr.
Ellsworth Toohey	Bart Slegers
Gail Wynand	Hans Kestling
Dominque Francon	Halina Reijn
Guy Francon	Hugo Koolschijn
Henry Cameron	Hugo Koolschijn
Austen Heller	Hugo Koolschijn
Mrs. Keating	Frieda Pittoors
Catherine Halsey	Tamar van den Dop
Steven Mallory	Robert de Hoog
Alvah Scarret	Robert de Hoog

== History ==
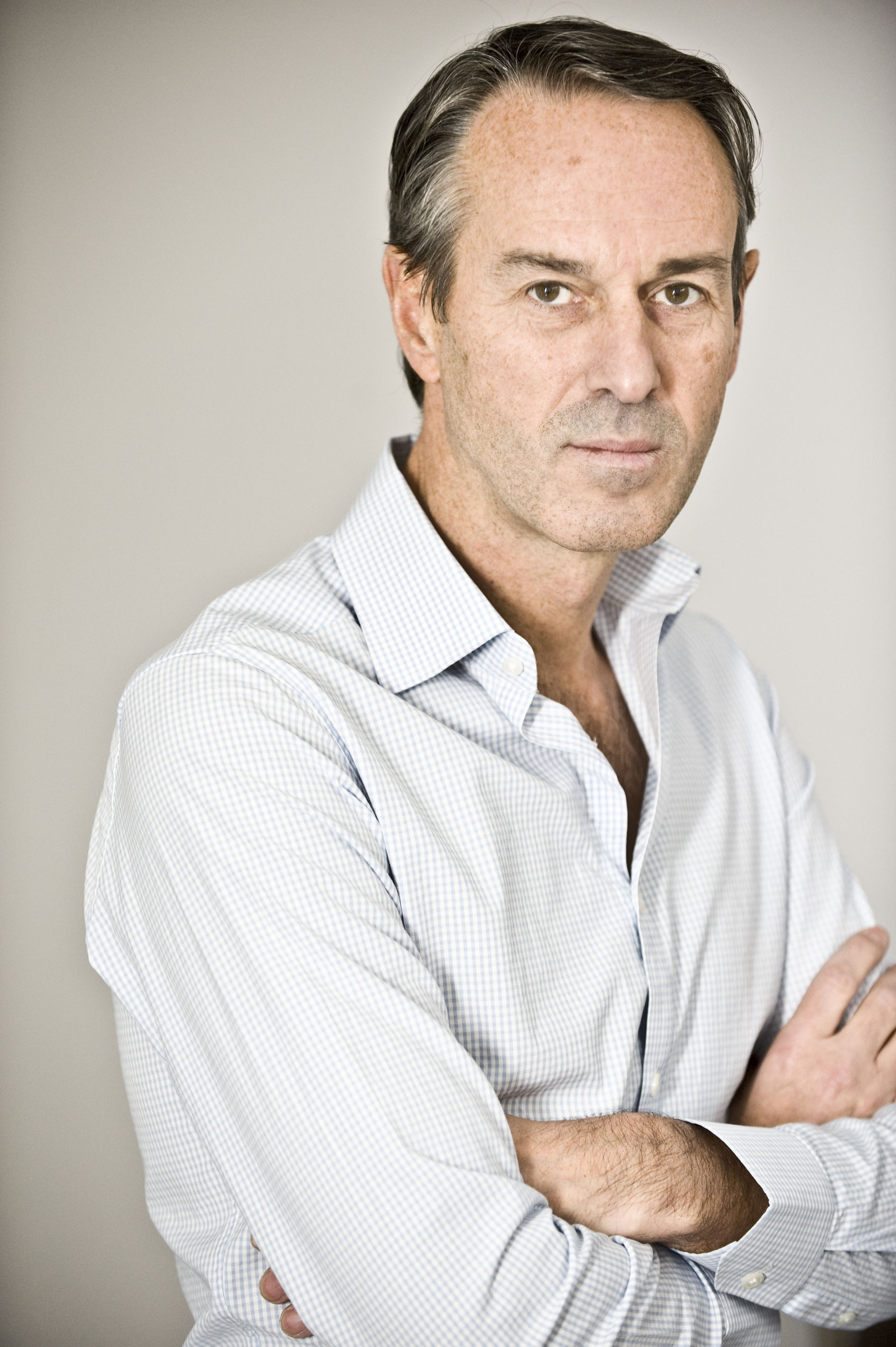
Ivo van Hove wrote and directed the play.

Author Ayn Rand's bestselling novel The Fountainhead, a 700-page epic, was published in 1943. Belgian theatre director Ivo van Hove, the artistic director for the Dutch theater company Toneelgroep Amsterdam, was given a copy of the novel as a gift in 2007. After reading it, he was immediately interested in adapting it for the stage, but he was not able to secure the adaptation rights until 2012. The four-hour-plus production debuted at the Holland Festival on 15 June 2014. Ramsey Nasr starred as Howard Roark, with Halina Reijn as Dominique Francon.

After its debut the play went on tour, appearing in Barcelona, Spain, in early July 2014 and at the Festival d'Avignon in France later that month. The play appeared at the Odéon-Théâtre de l'Europe in Paris in November 2016.

The company traveled to the Republic of Korea in 2017, presenting the play at the LG Arts Center in Seoul from 31 March to 2 April. Later in 2017, the play had its first American production at the Brooklyn Academy of Music's Next Wave Festival, where it ran from 28 November to 2 December. The play debuted in the United Kingdom at the Manchester International Festival in July 2019.

== Reception ==
The European productions of the play received mostly positive reviews. The Festival d'Avignon production received positive reviews from the French newspapers La Croix, Les Échos, and Le Monde, as well as from the English newspaper The Guardian, whose reviewer described it as "electrifying theatre". The French magazine Télérama gave the Avignon production a negative review, calling the source material inferior and complaining about the use of video screens on the set. Another French magazine, La Terrasse, complimented the staging and acting of the Odéon production.

American critics gave mostly negative reviews of the Next Wave Festival production. Helen Shaw's review for The Village Voice said that the adaptation was unwatchable because it portrayed Rand's characters and views seriously without undercutting them. The reviewer for the Financial Times said that the play was too long and that van Hove had approached Rand's "noxious" book with too much reverence. In a mixed review for The New York Times, critic Ben Brantley complimented van Hove for capturing Rand's "sheer pulp appeal", but described the material as "hokum with a whole lot of ponderous speeches". A review for The Huffington Post complimented van Hove's ability to portray Rand's message, but said the play was an hour too long.

When the play appeared at the Manchester International Festival, the reviewer for The Times said it was engaging for the first three hours, but dragged in the final hour. In The Guardian, Michael Billington criticized the choice of source material, but said the production was inventively staged and showed van Hove's "characteristic virtuosity".
