= Heidi Schreck =

American writer and actress

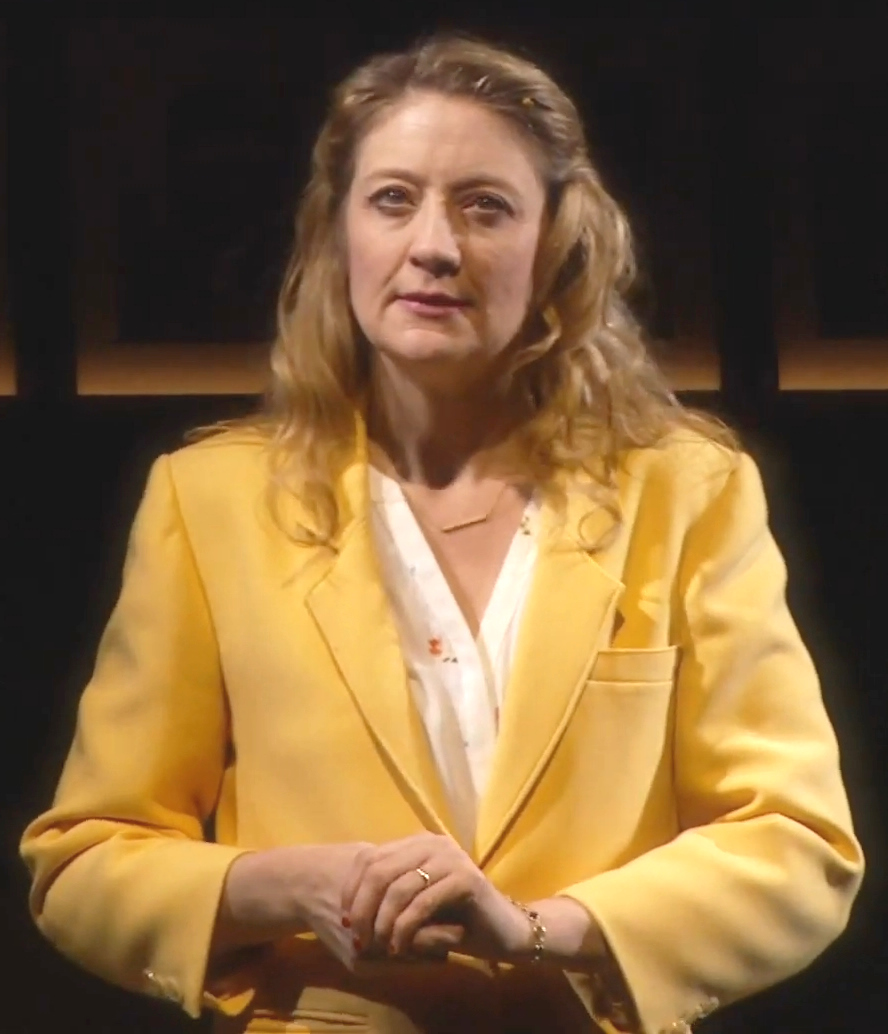
- Born: September 26, 1971 (age 54)
- Education: University of Oregon (BA)
- Occupations: Playwright, screenwriter, actress
- Spouse: Kip Fagan
- Writing career
- Notable work: What the Constitution Means to Me (2017)
- Notable awards: Obie Award for Distinguished Performance by an Actress (2008)

Heidi Schreck (born September 26, 1971) is an American playwright, screenwriter, and actress from Wenatchee, Washington. Her play What the Constitution Means to Me, which she also performs in, was a finalist for the 2019 Pulitzer Prize for Drama and Tony Awards for 2019 Best Play and Best Actress in a Play.

== Career ==
Schreck attended the University of Oregon and upon graduation worked in Siberia, teaching English. She then was a journalist in St. Petersburg, Russia. She next moved to Seattle, Washington where she started working as an actress and writer.

Schreck's first play, titled Creature, debuted in New York and was directed by Leigh Silverman and produced by New Georges and Page 73. Her following plays include There Are No More Big Secrets (directed by Kip Fagan at Rattlestick Playwrights Theatre), The Consultant (produced by The Long Wharf), and Grand Concourse (at Playwrights Horizons). Schreck has also written episodes of the TV series I Love Dick, Nurse Jackie, and Billions.

She is the writer and star of What the Constitution Means to Me, which opened on Broadway on March 31, 2019. This play is partially autobiographical, relating her real-life experience in participating in debates as a teen. The play was picked up as a movie directed by Marielle Heller for streaming by Amazon and released in time for the 2020 Presidential elections. The play challenges America's understanding of values and protections as they are outlined in the U.S. Constitution. In particular, Schreck points out how the document does little to ensure the freedoms and wellbeing of women and minority groups.

Schreck has performed Off-Broadway in, among others, Drum of the Waves of Horikawa (HERE Arts Center, 2007) and Circle Mirror Transformation (2009) and How the World Began (Women's Project, 2011) at Playwrights Horizons.

Schreck is married to director Kip Fagan. As of 2019, they live in Park Slope, Brooklyn. They have two children.

== Honors and awards ==
She won the 2008 Obie Award for Distinguished Performance by an Actress for Drum of the Waves of Horikawa. She won the 2010 Obie Award for Distinguished Performance by an Actress for Circle Mirror Transformation. Schreck and the cast of Circle Mirror Transformation received a 2010 Drama Desk Award, Outstanding Ensemble Performance.

Her play Grand Concourse, performed in 2014–2015 at Playwrights Horizons and Steppenwolf Theatres, received the Lilly Awards, the Stacey Mindich "Go Write A Play" Award for best new play in 2015, and was a finalist for the 2014–2015 Susan Smith Blackburn Prize. Schreck was a Playwrights Horizons Tow Foundation Playwright-in-Residence in 2014. Grand Concourse received an Edgerton Foundation New American Plays award.

She received a commission from the Atlantic Theatre Company in conjunction with the Kenyon Institute at Kenyon College in June 2016. She appeared at the Kenyon Playwrights Conference and taught a master class.

Schreck was a finalist for the 2018–2019 Susan Smith Blackburn prize for her play What the Constitution Means to Me. What the Constitution Means to Me was a finalist for the 2019 Pulitzer Prize for Drama. The play was nominated for the 2019 Tony Award for Best Play and Schreck was nominated for the 2019 Tony Award for Best Actress in a Play.

Schreck is the co-winner, with Amy Herzog, of the 2019 Horton Foote Playwriting Award, which includes a $12,500 monetary award.

She is the recipient of the 2018 Hull-Warriner Award, presented by the Dramatists Guild of America Council for What the Constitution Means to Me. The award is presented to an American author honoring a work "dealing with social, political or religious mores of the time".

In 2019, Schreck won the Smithsonian magazine's American Ingenuity award.

== Select works ==
=== Plays ===
- Creature (2009)
- There Are No More Big Secrets (2010)
- The Consultant (2014)
- Grand Concourse (2014)
- What the Constitution Means to Me (2019)
- Uncle Vanya (2024, adaptation)
- Searching for Elsie Parrish (2026, short play)

=== Television ===
- Nurse Jackie (2014-2015, 3 episodes)
- Billions (2016, 2 episodes)
- I Love Dick (2017, 1 episode, 1 co-written episode with Annie Baker)

== Support for the Equal Rights Amendment ==
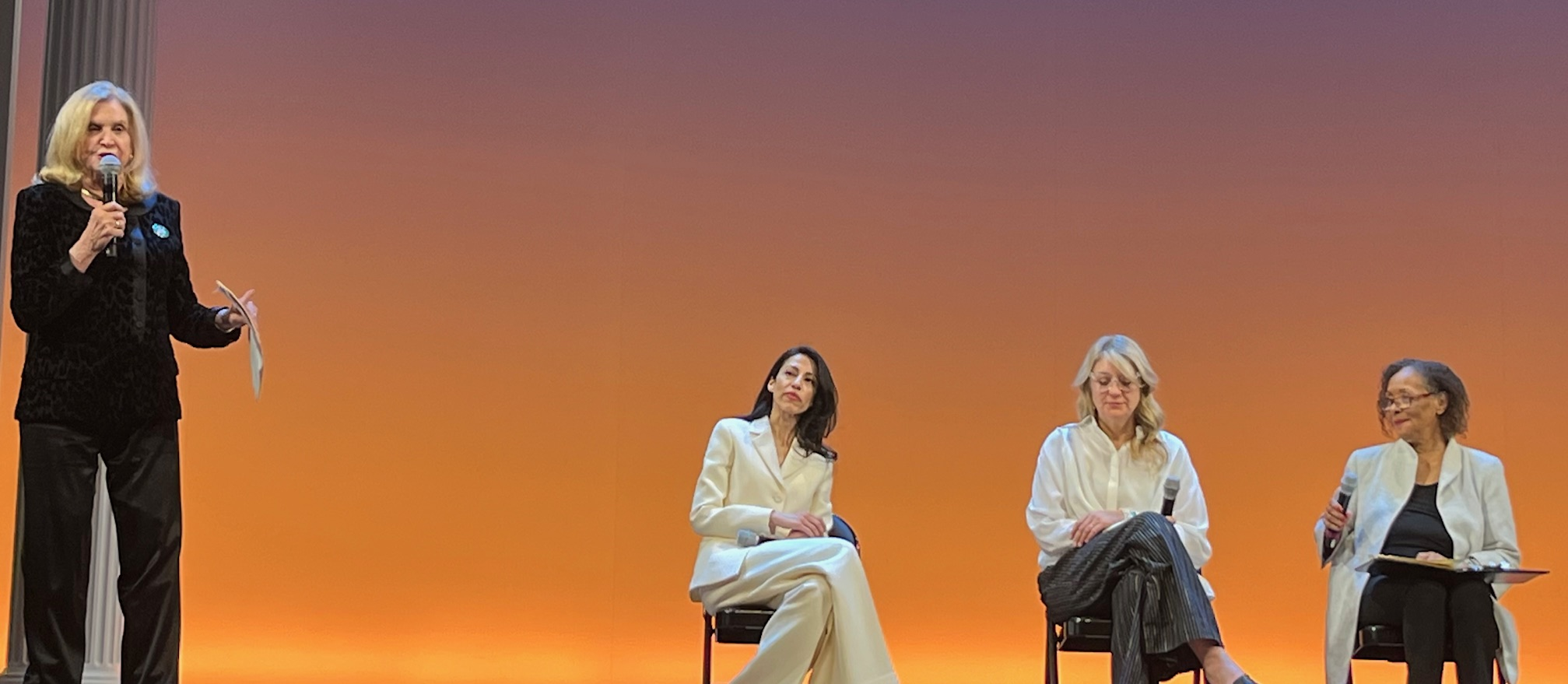
ERA night at Suffs musical, April 25, 2024

Schreck is an advocate for the Equal Rights Amendment (ERA). On April 25, 2024 she spoke as part of a pro-ERA panel alongside Gloria Steinem and Carol Jenkins after a performance of the musical Suffs.
