= A View from the Bridge =

1955 play by Arthur Miller

- First edition cover
- Original language: English
- Written by: Arthur Miller
- Setting: The apartment and environment of Eddie Carbone

Premiere
- Date: September 29, 1955
- Place: Coronet Theatre (now Eugene O'Neill Theatre); New York City

A View from the Bridge is a play by American playwright Arthur Miller. It was first staged on September 29, 1955, as a one-act verse drama with A Memory of Two Mondays at the Coronet Theatre on Broadway. The run was unsuccessful, and Miller subsequently revised and extended the play to contain two acts; this version is the one with which audiences are most familiar. The two-act version premiered in the New Watergate theatre club in London's West End under the direction of Peter Brook on October 11, 1956.

The play is set in 1950s America, in an Italian-American neighborhood near the Brooklyn Bridge in New York. It employs a chorus and narrator in the character of Alfieri. Eddie, the tragic protagonist, has an improper love for, and almost an obsession with, Catherine, his wife Beatrice's orphaned niece, so he does not approve of her courtship of Beatrice's cousin Rodolpho. Miller's interest in writing about the world of the New York docks originated with an unproduced screenplay that he developed with Elia Kazan in the early 1950s (titled The Hook) that addressed corruption on the Brooklyn docks. Kazan later directed On the Waterfront, which dealt with the same subject.

== Synopsis ==
The action is narrated by Alfieri, who was raised in 1900s Italy but is now working as an American lawyer, thereby representing the "Bridge" between the two cultures.

=== Act 1 ===
In the opening speech, Alfieri describes the violent history of the small Brooklyn community of Red Hook and tells us that the second-generation Sicilians are now more civilized, more American, and are prepared to "settle for half" and let the law handle their disputes. But there are exceptions, and he then begins to narrate the story of Eddie Carbone, an Italian American longshoreman who lives with his wife Beatrice and her orphaned niece Catherine.

Eddie is a good man who, although ostensibly protective and fatherly towards Catherine, harbors a growing passion for her as she approaches her 18th birthday. We learn that he has not had sex with his wife for nearly three months. Catherine is studying to become a stenographer and Eddie objects to her taking a job she has been offered until she finishes her coursework, expressing a dislike for the way she dresses and the interest she is beginning to show in men. Beatrice is more supportive of Catherine's ventures and persuades Eddie to let her take the job.

Eddie returns home one afternoon with the news that Beatrice's two cousins, brothers Marco and Rodolpho, have safely arrived in New York as illegal immigrants. He has agreed to house them saying that he is honored to be able to help family. Marco is quiet and thoughtful, possessing remarkable strength, whereas Rodolpho is more unconventional, with plans to make a career singing in America. Marco has a family starving in Italy and plans to return after working illegally for several years, whereas Rodolpho intends to stay. Although Eddie, Beatrice, and Catherine are at first excellent hosts, cracks appear when Rodolpho and Catherine begin dating.

Eddie convinces himself that Rodolpho is homosexual and is only expressing interest in Catherine so he can marry her and gain status as a legal citizen. He confronts Catherine with his beliefs and she turns to Beatrice for advice. Beatrice, starting to realize Eddie's true feelings, tells her that she should marry Rodolpho and move out. In the meantime, Eddie turns to Alfieri, hoping for help from the law. However, Alfieri tells him that the only recourse he has is to report Rodolpho and Marco as undocumented. Seeing no solution to his problem, Eddie becomes increasingly desperate and takes his anger out on Rodolpho and, in teaching him to box, "accidentally" injures him. Marco reacts by quietly threatening Eddie, showing his strength by holding a heavy chair above Eddie's head with one hand and "smiling with triumph".

=== Act 2 ===
A few months have passed and Eddie reaches a breaking point when he discovers that Catherine and Rodolpho have slept together and are intent on marrying. Drunk, he kisses Catherine and then attempts to prove that Rodolpho is gay by suddenly and passionately kissing him. After a violent confrontation, Eddie orders Rodolpho to leave the apartment.

Eddie visits Alfieri and insists that the kiss has proved Rodolpho is gay and that he is only marrying Catherine for citizenship, but once again Alfieri says the law cannot help. Out of desperation, Eddie phones immigration services but in the meantime, Beatrice has arranged for Marco and Rodolpho to move in with two other undocumented immigrants in the flat above. Eddie learns that Catherine and Rodolpho have arranged to marry within a week and about the two new immigrants that have moved into the building and, with both anger and fright, frantically urges Catherine and Beatrice to move them out. When immigration officials arrive and arrest Marco, Rodolpho, and the two other immigrants, Eddie pretends that the arrest comes as a complete surprise to him, but Beatrice and Marco see through this. Marco spits in Eddie's face in front of everyone and accuses Eddie of killing his starving children. Eddie tries to convince the neighborhood of his innocence but they turn away from him.

Alfieri visits Marco and Rodolpho in custody, obtaining their release on bail until their hearing comes up. Alfieri explains that Rodolpho will be able to stay once he has married Catherine but warns Marco that he will have to return to Italy. Vengeful, Marco confronts Eddie publicly on his release, and Eddie turns on him with a knife, demanding that he take back his accusations and restore his honor. In the ensuing scuffle, Eddie is stabbed with his own knife by Marco and dies, as his stunned family and neighbors stand around.

When he witnesses Eddie's death, Alfieri trembles because he realizes that, even though it was wrong, something "perversely pure" calls to him and he is filled with admiration. But, he tells the audience, settling for half-measures is better, it must be, and so he mourns Eddie with a sense of alarm at his own feelings.

== Characters and cast ==
Notable casts

Character	Broadway	West End	Broadway Revival	West End Revival	Broadway Revival	Broadway Revival	London Revival	Broadway Revival	Off-Broadway Revival
Character	1955	1956	1983	1987	1997	2010	2014	2015	2026
Eddie Carbone	Van Heflin	Anthony Quayle	Tony Lo Bianco	Michael Gambon	Anthony LaPaglia	Liev Schreiber	Mark Strong	Mark Strong	Sam Rockwell
Beatrice	Eileen Heckart	Megs Jenkins	Rose Gregorio	Elizabeth Bell	Allison Janney	Jessica Hecht	Nicola Walker	Nicola Walker	Carla Gugino
Catherine	Gloria Marlow	Mary Ure	Saundra Santiago	Suzan Sylvester	Brittany Murphy	Scarlett Johansson	Phoebe Fox	Phoebe Fox	Riley Prior
Alfieri	J. Carrol Naish	Michael Gwynn	Robert Prosky	—N/a	Stephen Spinella	Michael Cristofer	Michael Gould	Michael Gould	Alfred Molina
Marco	Jack Warden	Ian Bannen	Alan Feinstein	Michael Simkins	Adam Trese	Corey Stoll	Emun Elliott	Michael Zegen	Tom Pecinka
Rodolpho	Richard Davalos	Brian Bedford	James Hayden	Adrian Rawlins	Gabriel Olds	Morgan Spector	Luke Norris	Russell Tovey	Fred Hechinger
Louis	David Clarke	Richard Harris	Stephen Mendillo	Russell Dixon	Daniel Serafini-Sauli	Robert Turano	Richard Hansell	Richard Hansell	—N/a
Mike	Tom Pedi	Normal Mitchell	John Shepard	Joan Arthur	Mark Zeisler	Joe Ricci	—N/a	—N/a	—N/a
Tony	Antony Vorno	Ralph Nossek	Paul Perri	Paul Todd		Matthew Montelongo	—N/a	—N/a	—N/a
Officer 1	Curt Conway	John Stone	Ramon Ramos	Allan Mitchell	John Speredakos	Anthony DeSando	Thomas Michael Hammond	Thomas Michael Hammond	—N/a
Officer 2	Ralph Bell	Colin Rix	James Vitale	Simon Coady	Christian Lincoln	Marco Verna	—N/a	—N/a	—N/a

Characters

- Eddie Carbone - A longshoreman who is married to Beatrice while pining for his wife's niece Catherine.
- Beatrice - The warm and caring wife of Eddie Carbone and aunt of Catherine.
- Catherine - Catherine is a beautiful, smart, young Italian-American girl who is very popular among the boys in the community.
- Alfieri - An Italian-American lawyer. Alfieri is the narrator of the story.
- Marco - Marco is a hard-working Italian cousin to Beatrice. He is a powerful, sympathetic leader.
- Rodolpho - Beatrice's young, blonde cousin from Italy. Rodolpho prefers singing jazz to working on the ships. He cooks, sews, and loves to dance.
- Louis - A longshoreman and friend of Eddie's. Louis hangs out with Mike outside Eddie's home.
- Mike - A longshoreman and friend of Eddie's. Mike is often seen with Louis outside the Carbone home.
- Tony - A friend of the Carbones. He assists Marco and Rodolpho off the ship and brings them safely to Beatrice's home.
- Two Immigration Officers - Two officers from the Immigration Bureau who come to look for Marco and Rodolpho at Eddie's request.

== Production history ==
=== Premieres ===
The one-act, verse version of A View from the Bridge opened on Broadway on September 29, 1955, at the Coronet Theatre (now the Eugene O'Neill Theatre); Marilyn Monroe was in the audience. It ran for 149 performances. This production was directed by Martin Ritt and the cast included Van Heflin as Eddie and Eileen Heckart as Beatrice.

Its two-act version premiered in London's West End under the direction of Peter Brook. It opened at the New Watergate theatre club (currently Harold Pinter Theatre) on October 11, 1956, and the cast included Richard Harris as Louis and Anthony Quayle as Eddie, with lighting design by Lee Watson.

=== Revivals in New York ===
Dustin Hoffman acted as assistant director and stage manager for a successful 1965 production of the play Off-Broadway at the Sheridan Square Playhouse in New York City. The play's director, Ulu Grosbard, suggested to Arthur Miller that Hoffman would one day make a great Willy Loman (a role that Hoffman would later play to great acclaim). Miller was unimpressed and later wrote "My estimate of Grosbard all but collapsed as, observing Dustin Hoffman's awkwardness and his big nose that never seemed to get unstuffy, I wondered how the poor fellow imagined himself a candidate for any kind of acting career."

Another production in New York opened on February 3, 1983, at the Ambassador Theatre, with Tony Lo Bianco as Eddie and directed by Arvin Brown. It ran for 149 performances.

An award-winning production in New York opened on December 14, 1997, at the Criterion Center Stage Right and subsequently transferred to the Neil Simon Theatre. It ran for 239 performances. It was directed by Michael Mayer and the cast included Anthony LaPaglia, Allison Janney, and Brittany Murphy. The production won the Tony Award for: Best Revival of a Play; Best Leading Actor in a Play (LaPaglia); it also won Drama Desk Awards for Outstanding Revival, Outstanding Featured Actress in a Play (Janney), and Outstanding Direction of a Play.

A revival at the Cort Theatre on Broadway in 2009 starred Liev Schreiber, Scarlett Johansson and Jessica Hecht. The limited, 14-week engagement, directed by Gregory Mosher, began with previews on December 28, 2009, and officially opened on January 24, 2010. It ran until April 4, 2010. Johansson won a Tony Award for her performance.

From October 2015 through February 2016, a production of the play that originated at the Young Vic Theatre in London in 2014 ran on Broadway at the Lyceum Theatre featuring its original London cast. It won the Tony Award for Best Revival of a Play; the director, Ivo van Hove won the Tony Award for Best Direction of a Play.

A revival is set to begin performances November 27, 2026, at the Ellen Stewart Theatre with direction from Neil Pepe. Sam Rockwell, who produces with Mark Berger, will play Eddie Carbone, alongside Marin Ireland as Beatrice and Alfred Molina as Alfieri.

=== Revivals in London ===
The National Theatre of Great Britain staged a production in 1987 at the Cottesloe Theatre. It was directed by Alan Ayckbourn and Michael Gambon gave an acclaimed performance as Eddie. Time Out called the production "near perfect" and the New Statesman called it "one of the finest events to be presented at the National Theatre since it moved to the South Bank."

Another West End production was staged at the Duke of York's Theatre, opening in previews on January 24, 2009, and officially on February 5. It ran until May 16, 2009. It was directed by Lindsay Posner, with Ken Stott as Eddie, Mary Elizabeth Mastrantonio as Beatrice, Hayley Atwell as Catherine and Harry Lloyd as Rodolpho.

In 2014, Belgian director Ivo van Hove and lead actors Mark Strong (as Eddie), Phoebe Fox (Catherine), and Nicola Walker (Beatrice) revived the play to huge success at the Young Vic. This revival won three Laurence Olivier Awards in April 2015, for Best Actor (Mark Strong), Best Revival, and Best Director (Ivo van Hove). The Young Vic production transferred to Broadway with its British cast intact.

In 2024, Lindsay Posner directed Dominic West as Eddie and Kate Fleetwood as Beatrice. Callum Scott Howells plays the role of Rodolpho. This production began at Theatre Royal Bath Ustinov Studio, before transferring to the Theatre Royal Haymarket.

=== Other revivals ===
In 1992, the Royal Exchange, Manchester staged a production directed by Greg Hersov with Jonathan Hackett, Michael Sheen and Kate Byers, the same year that the Royal Theatre Northampton produced an acclaimed production directed by Michael Napier-Brown, designed by Ray Lett and a cast featuring David Hargreaves (Eddie), Kathrine Schlesinger, Nicola Scott, Richard Harradine, Colin Atkins and Duncan Law.

After the Ivo van Hove 2015 production closed on Broadway, it was restaged by the Centre Theatre Group of Los Angeles with a new cast that included Frederick Weller (Eddie), Andrus Nichols (Beatrice), Catherine Combs (Catherine), Alex Esola (Marco), and David Register (Rodolpho); this cast then toured to the Kennedy Center in Washington. In 2017, van Hove directed the play at the Goodman Theatre in Chicago. Combs and Nichols reprised their roles, joined by Ian Bedford as Eddie. In 2023 the Chichester Festival Theatre staged a production with Jonathan Slinger as Eddie, Nancy Crane as Alfieri, Kirsty Bushell as Beatrice, Rachelle Diedericks as Catherine, and Luke Newberry as Rodolpho.

== Adaptations ==
=== Film ===
Italian film director Luchino Visconti directed a stage version of the play in Italy in 1958. The plot of his film Rocco and His Brothers (Rocco e i suoi fratelli), made in 1960, has many affinities with A View from the Bridge.

A French-Italian film A View from the Bridge was released in February 1962. Directed by Sidney Lumet, the film starred Raf Vallone and Maureen Stapleton as Eddie and Beatrice, with Carol Lawrence as Catherine. The film was the first time that a kiss between men was shown on screen in America, albeit in this case it is intended as an accusation of being gay, rather than a romantic expression. In a major change to the plot of the play, Eddie commits suicide after being publicly beaten by Marco.

=== Television ===
On 4 April 1966, ITV aired A View from the Bridge as its ITV Play of the Week, of which no copies survive. Vallone also played Eddie in this version.

In 1986, the BBC aired a TV dramatisation of the play produced by Geoff Wilson.

=== Opera ===
Renzo Rossellini, the brother of film director Roberto Rossellini, was the first to adapt the play into an opera with his Uno sguardo dal ponte, which premiered at the Teatro dell'Opera di Roma in 1961.

In 1999, another operatic version, with music by William Bolcom and a libretto by Arnold Weinstein and Arthur Miller, premiered at Lyric Opera of Chicago starring Kim Josephson as Eddie Carbone. The work was performed subsequently at the Metropolitan Opera in 2002, again at the Washington National Opera in 2007, and by Vertical Player Repertory Opera in 2009, starring William Browning as Eddie. The opera was first performed in Europe at Theater Hagen in 2003 in German translation. The first English (original) language version produced in Europe opened at the Teatro dell'Opera di Roma in Rome on January 18, 2011.

=== Radio ===
L.A. Theatre Works released a radio adaptation of the play in 1998 featuring Ed O'Neill.

BBC Radio 3 produced a radio adaptation starring Alfred Molina, which was first broadcast on October 18, 2015, and then again on May 14, 2017. For his work on the production, Molina was awarded the BBC Audio Drama Award for Best Actor.

== Awards and nominations ==
=== Original Broadway production ===
Year	Award ceremony	Category	Nominee	Result
1956	Theatre World Award		Richard Davalos	Won

=== 1983 Broadway revival ===
Year	Award ceremony	Category	Nominee	Result
1983	Tony Award	Best Revival		Nominated
1983	Tony Award	Best Performance by a Leading Actor in a Play	Tony Lo Bianco	Nominated
1983	Drama Desk Award	Outstanding Featured Actor in a Play	Alan Feinstein	Won
1983	Outer Critics Circle Award	Outstanding Actor in a Play	Tony Lo Bianco	Won

=== 1997 Broadway revival ===
Year	Award ceremony	Category	Nominee	Result
1998	Tony Award	Best Revival of a Play		Won
1998	Tony Award	Best Actor in a Play	Anthony LaPaglia	Won
1998	Tony Award	Best Actress in a Play	Allison Janney	Nominated
1998	Tony Award	Best Direction of a Play	Michael Mayer	Nominated
1998	Drama Desk Award	Outstanding Revival of a Play	Arthur Miller	Won
1998	Drama Desk Award	Outstanding Actor in a Play	Anthony LaPaglia	Won
1998	Drama Desk Award	Outstanding Featured Actress in a Play	Allison Janney	Won
1998	Drama Desk Award	Outstanding Director of a Play	Michael Mayer	Won
1998	Drama Desk Award	Outstanding Sound Design	Mark Bennett	Nominated
1998	Drama Desk Award	Outstanding Lighting Design	Kenneth Posner	Nominated
1998	Outer Critics Circle Award	Outstanding Revival of a Play		Won
1998	Outer Critics Circle Award	Outstanding Actor in a Play	Anthony LaPaglia	Won
1998	Outer Critics Circle Award	Outstanding Featured Actress in a Play	Allison Janney	Won
1998	Outer Critics Circle Award	Outstanding Director of a Play	Michael Mayer	Won
1998	Drama League Award	Distinguished Production of a Revival		Nominated

=== 2009 West End revival ===
Year	Award ceremony	Category	Nominee	Result
2010	Laurence Olivier Award	Best Revival		Nominated
2010	Laurence Olivier Award	Best Actor	Ken Stott	Nominated
2010	Laurence Olivier Award	Best Actress in a Supporting Role	Hayley Atwell	Nominated
2010	Laurence Olivier Award	Best Director	Lindsay Posner	Nominated

=== 2010 Broadway revival ===
Year	Award ceremony	Category	Nominee	Result
2010	Tony Award	Best Revival of a Play		Nominated
2010	Tony Award	Best Actor in a Play	Liev Schreiber	Nominated
2010	Tony Award	Best Featured Actress in a Play	Scarlett Johansson	Won
2010	Tony Award	Best Featured Actress in a Play	Jessica Hecht	Nominated
2010	Tony Award	Best Direction of a Play	Gregory Mosher	Nominated
2010	Tony Award	Best Sound Design of a Play	Scott Lehrer	Nominated
2010	Drama Desk Award	Outstanding Revival of a Play		Won
2010	Drama Desk Award	Outstanding Actor in a Play	Liev Schreiber	Won
2010	Drama Desk Award	Outstanding Featured Actress in a Play	Scarlett Johansson	Nominated
2010	Outer Critics Circle Award	Outstanding Revival of a Play		Nominated
2010	Outer Critics Circle Award	Outstanding Actor in a Play	Liev Schreiber	Nominated
2010	Drama League Award	Distinguished Revival of a Play		Won
2010	Theatre World Award		Scarlett Johansson	Won

=== 2014 West End revival ===
Year	Award ceremony	Category	Nominee	Result
2015	Laurence Olivier Award	Best Revival		Won
2015	Laurence Olivier Award	Best Actor	Mark Strong	Won
2015	Laurence Olivier Award	Best Actress in a Supporting Role	Phoebe Fox	Nominated
2015	Laurence Olivier Award	Best Director	Ivo van Hove	Won
2015	Laurence Olivier Award	Best Set Design	Jan Versweyveld	Nominated
2015	Laurence Olivier Award	Best Lighting Design	Jan Versweyveld	Nominated
2015	Laurence Olivier Award	Best Sound Design	Tom Gibbons	Nominated

=== 2015 Broadway revival ===
Year	Award ceremony	Category	Nominee	Result
2016	Tony Award	Best Revival of a Play		Won
2016	Tony Award	Best Actor in a Play	Mark Strong	Nominated
2016	Tony Award	Best Direction of a Play	Ivo van Hove	Won
2016	Tony Award	Best Scenic Design of a Play	Jan Versweyveld	Nominated
2016	Tony Award	Best Lighting Design of a Play	Jan Versweyveld	Nominated
2016	Drama Desk Award	Outstanding Revival of a Play		Won
2016	Drama Desk Award	Outstanding Actor in a Play	Mark Strong	Nominated
2016	Drama Desk Award	Outstanding Actress in a Play	Nicola Walker	Nominated
2016	Drama Desk Award	Outstanding Director of a Play	Ivo van Hove	Won
2016	Outer Critics Circle Award	Outstanding Revival of a Play		Nominated
2016	Outer Critics Circle Award	Outstanding Actor in a Play	Mark Strong	Nominated
2016	Outer Critics Circle Award	Outstanding Actress in a Play	Nicola Walker	Nominated
2016	Outer Critics Circle Award	Outstanding Director of a Play	Ivo van Hove	Won
2016	Drama League Award	Distinguished Revival of a Play		Won
2016	Theatre World Award		Mark Strong	Won
