= Network (play) =

Play by Lee Hall, adapted from the 1976 film of the same name

- Poster for the National Theatre production
- Original language: English
- Written by: Lee Hall (play); Paddy Chayefsky (film)

Premiere
- Date: 13 November 2017
- Place: Lyttleton Theatre, National Theatre, London

Network is a play by Lee Hall, adapted from the 1976 film of the same name which had an Academy Award–winning screenplay by Paddy Chayefsky and was directed by Sidney Lumet.

== Production history ==
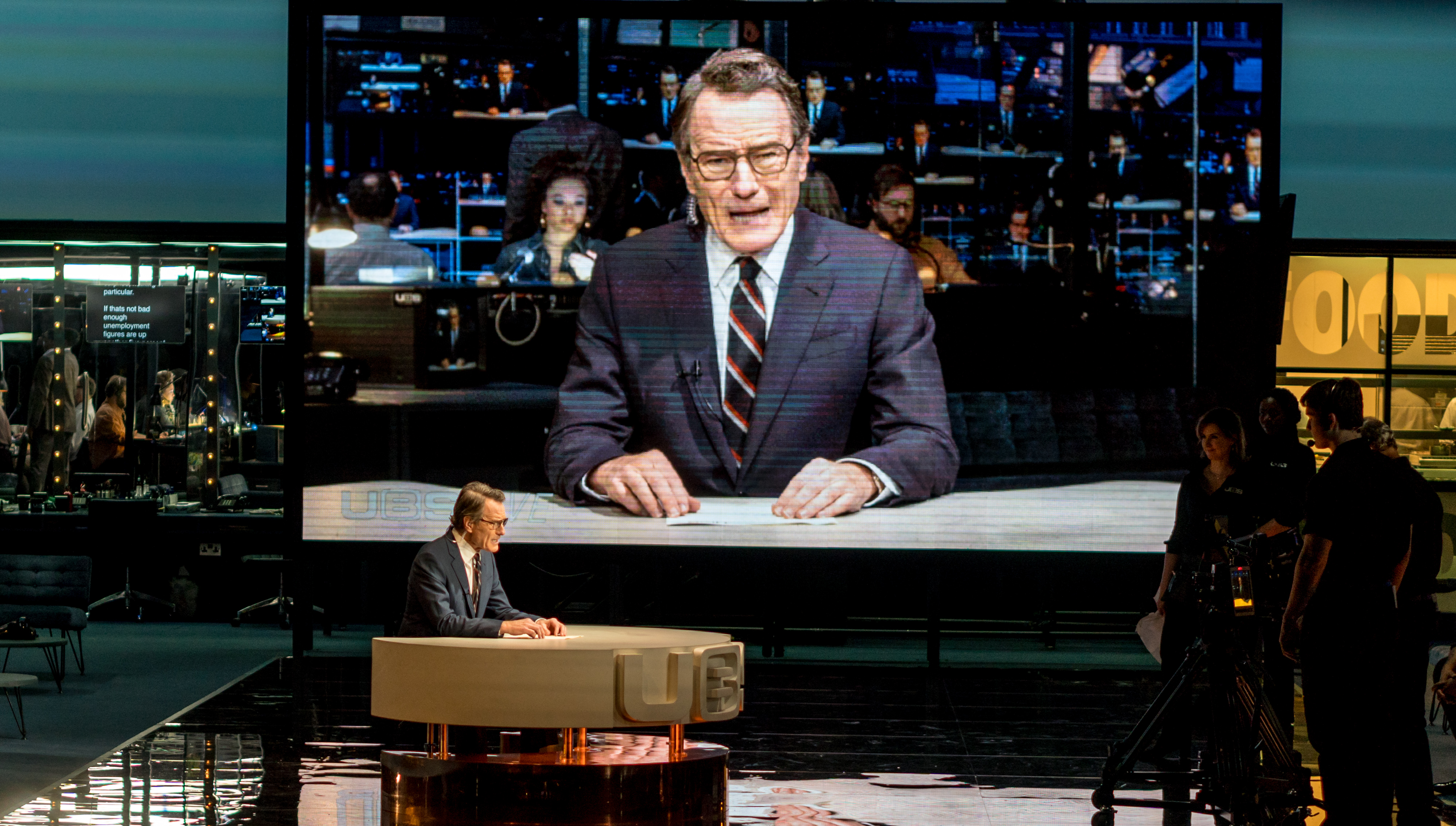
Bryan Cranston as Howard Beale during the play in the National Theatre production

The play premiered in the Lyttleton Theatre at the National Theatre in London on 13 November 2017 (following previews from 4 November) and ran until 24 March 2018. The production was directed by Ivo Van Hove and starred Bryan Cranston as Howard Beale.

The play featured set and lighting design by Jan Versweyveld, video design by Tal Yarden, costume design by An D'Huys, music by Eric Sleichim and sound design by Tom Gibbons. It was produced in association with Patrick Myles, David Luff, Ros Povey and Lee Menzies and supported by Marcia Grand for the memory of Richard Grand.

The play also featured a live onstage television studio and an onstage restaurant titled Foodwork, where audience members could enjoy a three-course meal while watching the play.

The production premiered on Broadway at the Belasco Theatre, with previews beginning on 10 November 2018 and officially opening on 6 December 2018. Originally, the production was scheduled to run for 18 weeks only to 17 March, but extended multiple times before closing on 8 June 2019, the day before Cranston won the Tony. Originally, the transfer was scheduled to play the Cort Theatre, but following the early closure of Gettin' the Band Back Together, producers announced that the play would open at the Belasco Theatre. Cranston reprises the role of Howard Beale alongside Tatiana Maslany in her Broadway debut as Diana Christensen and Tony Goldwyn as Max Schumacher.

== Plot ==
The plot closely follows that of the 1976 film but uses stage devices and audio visual technology to immerse the audience as participants. The audience becomes part of the play both as diners and a studio audience. The distance between fact and fiction is reduced, mimicking the blurring of truth and fiction in contemporary news media. The play's most significant diversion from the film is a final monologue delivered by Howard Beale. Freed in death from his derangement, Beale warns about the destructive nature of absolute beliefs, urging the audience to instead exercise compassion and connection.

== Reception ==
The London production of the play received mostly rave reviews, singling out Cranston's performance.

== Cast and characters ==
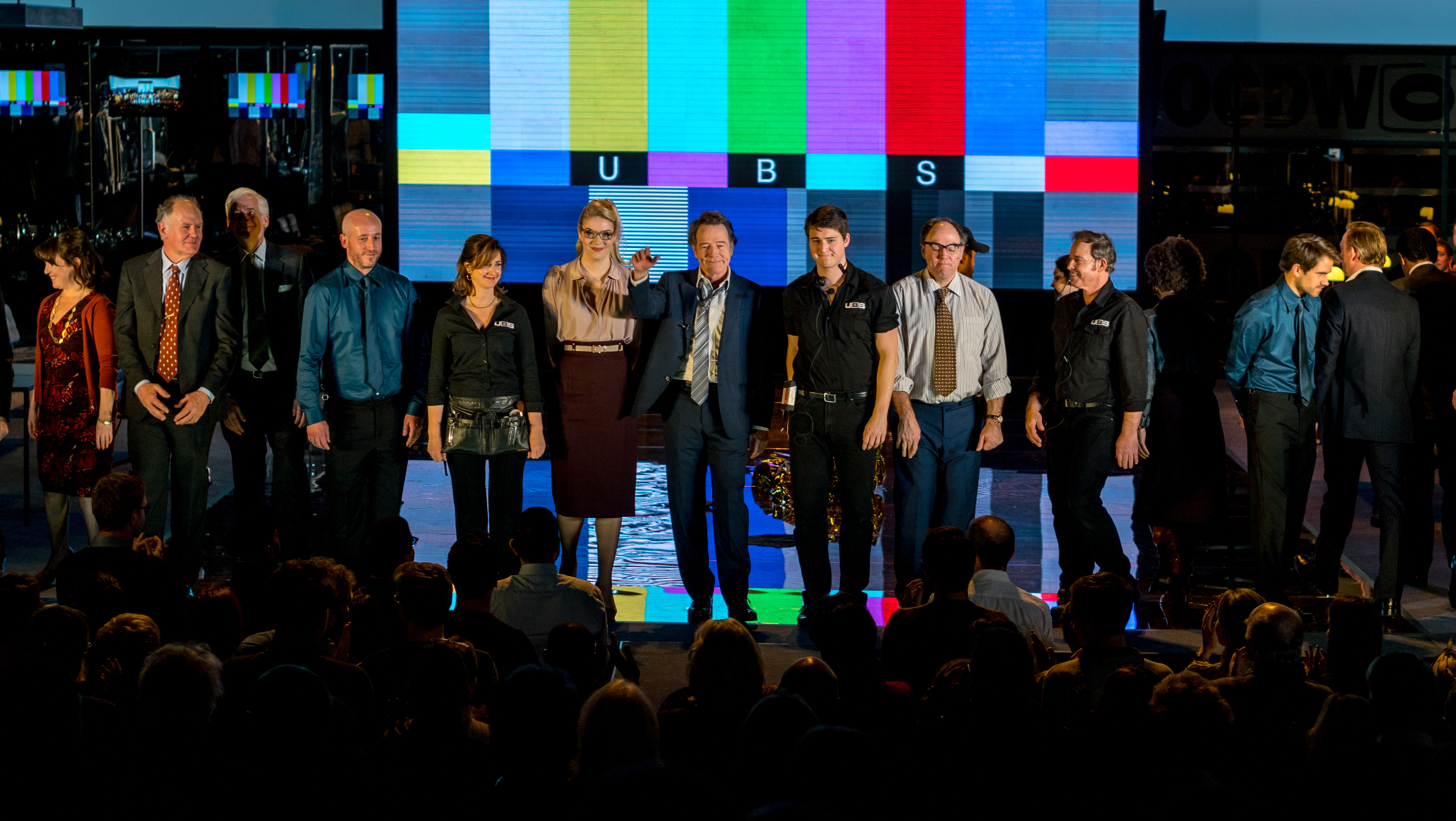
The cast and crew of the National Theatre production (dated 19 December 2017)

Characters	London (2017)	Broadway (2018)
Howard Beale, anchorman	Bryan Cranston	Bryan Cranston
Harry Hunter, associate producer	Charles Babalola	Julian Elijah Martinez
Max Schumacher, head of News	Douglas Henshall	Tony Goldwyn
Frank Hackett, executive	Tunji Kasim	Joshua Boone
Louise, Schumacher's wife	Caroline Faber	Alyssa Bresnahan
Ed Ruddy, chairman	Michael Elwyn	Ron Canada
Diana Christensen, director of Programming	Michelle Dockery	Tatiana Maslany
Schlesinger, her researcher	Evan Milton	Susannah Perkins
Nelson Chaney, executive	Tom Hodgkins	Frank Wood
Jack Snowden, presenter	Robert Gilbert	Barzin Akhavan
Arthur Jensen, head of UBS	Richard Cordery	Nick Wyman
Director	Ian Drysdale	Bill Timoney
Sheila, production assistant	Paksie Vernon	Nicole Villamil
Floor manager	Stuart Nunn	Jason Babinsky
Continuity announcer	Patrick Poletti	Henry Stram
Technicians	Tobi Bamtefa; Andrew Lewis; Beverly Longhurst; Rebecca Omogbehin	Gina Daniels; Nicholas Guest; Joe Paulik; Jeena Yi
Secretary	Isabelle Della-Porta	Camila Canó-Flaviá
ELA member	Danny Szam	Eric Chayefsky

== Awards and nominations ==
=== Original London production ===
Year	Award	Category	Nominee	Result
2017	Critics' Circle Theatre Award	Best Actor	Bryan Cranston	Won
2018	WhatsOnStage Awards	Best Actor in a Play	Bryan Cranston	Nominated
2018	WhatsOnStage Awards	Best Video Design	Tal Yarden	Nominated
2018	Laurence Olivier Awards	Best New Play		Nominated
2018	Laurence Olivier Awards	Best Actor	Bryan Cranston	Won
2018	Laurence Olivier Awards	Best Lighting Design	Jan Versweyveld	Nominated
2018	Laurence Olivier Awards	Best Sound Design	Eric Sleichim	Nominated

=== Original Broadway production ===
Year	Award	Category	Nominee	Result
2019	Tony Awards	Best Performance by an Actor in a Leading Role in a Play	Bryan Cranston	Won
2019	Tony Awards	Best Direction of a Play	Ivo van Hove	Nominated
2019	Tony Awards	Best Scenic Design of a Play	Jan Versweyveld	Nominated
2019	Tony Awards	Best Lighting Design of a Play	Jan Versweyveld and Tal Yarden	Nominated
2019	Tony Awards	Best Sound Design of a Play	Eric Seichim	Nominated
2019	Outer Critics Circle Awards	Outstanding New Broadway Play		Nominated
2019	Outer Critics Circle Awards	Outstanding Projection Design (Play or Musical)	Tal Yarden	Nominated
2019	Outer Critics Circle Awards	Outstanding Sound Design (Play or Musical)	Eric Sleichim	Nominated
2019	Outer Critics Circle Awards	Outstanding Actor in a Play	Bryan Cranston	Won
2019	Drama League Awards	Outstanding Production of a Broadway or Off-Broadway Musical		Nominated
2019	Drama League Awards	Distinguished Performance Award	Bryan Cranston	Won
