= Ivo van Hove =

Belgian theatre director (born 1958)

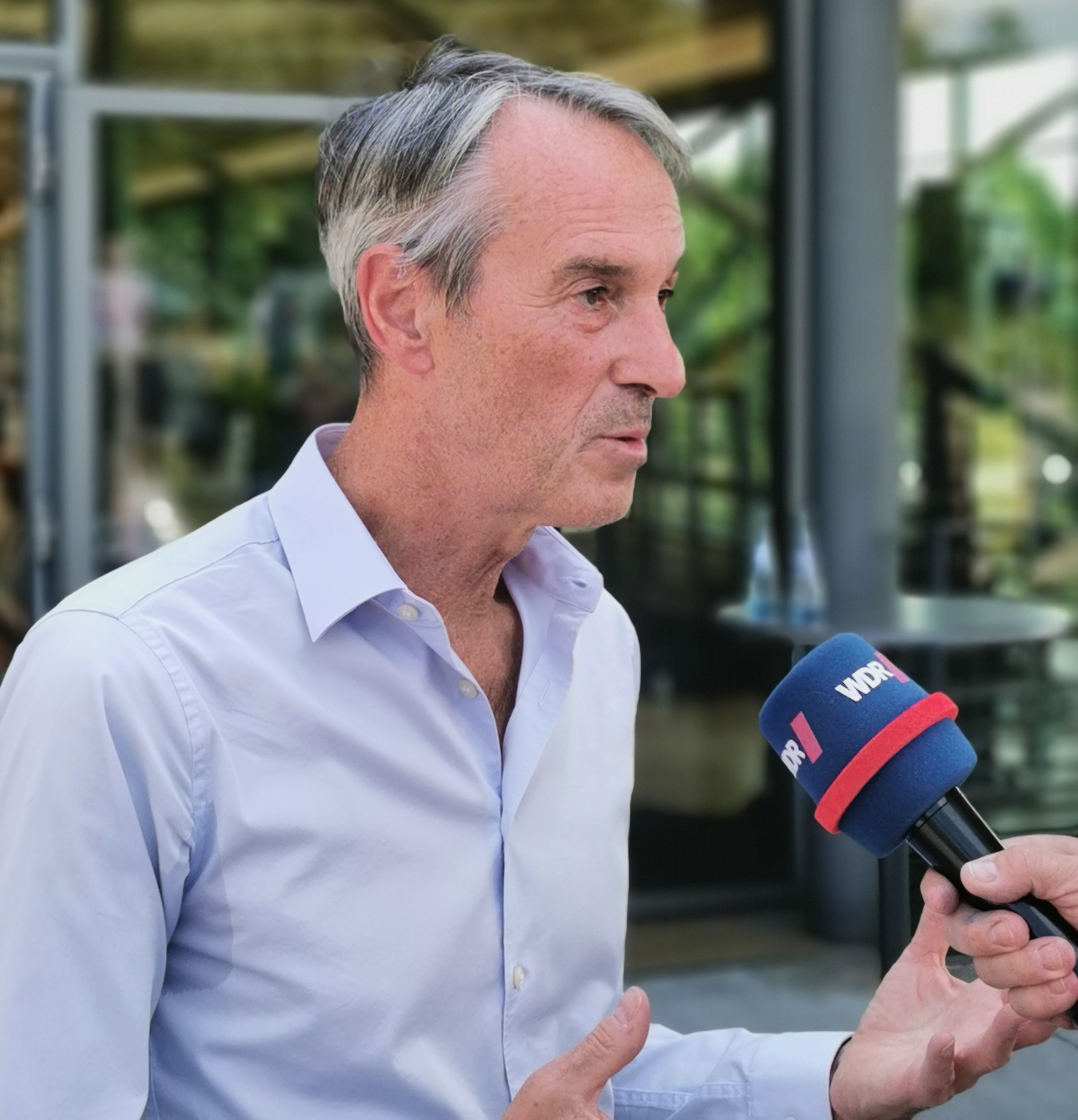
- Van Hove in 2024
- Born: 28 October 1958 (age 68); Heist-op-den-Berg, Belgium
- Occupation: Theatre director
- Years active: 1981–present
- Partner: Jan Versweyveld

Ivo van Hove (born 28 October 1958) is a Belgian theatre director. He is known for his Off-Broadway avant-garde experimental theatre productions. For over twenty years, he served as the director of the Toneelgroep Amsterdam. On Broadway, he has directed revival productions of Arthur Miller's A View from the Bridge, and The Crucible, Lee Hall's Network in 2018, and Leonard Bernstein and Stephen Sondheim's West Side Story in 2020. Among his numerous awards he has received a Tony Award and a Laurence Olivier Award for A View from the Bridge. He was made a Knight of the Ordre des Arts et des Lettres in France in 2004, and a Commander in the Order of the Crown in 2016.

== Career ==
Born in Heist-op-den-Berg, van Hove began his career as a stage director in 1981, working with plays he had written himself such as Ziektekiemen (Germs) and Geruchten (Rumors). He was artistic manager at AKT, Akt-Vertical and then De Tijd. Between 1990 and 2000 he worked as the director of Het Zuidelijk Toneel. From 2001 to 2023, van Hove was general director of Toneelgroep Amsterdam (the Amsterdam theatre group). He has coordinated productions at the Edinburgh International Festival, the Venice Biennale, the Holland Festival, Theater der Welt, and the Wiener Festwochen. He has directed companies from Hamburg's Deutsches Schauspielhaus, Staatstheater Stuttgart, directed Hedda Gabler, The Little Foxes and Scenes from a Marriage at the New York Theatre Workshop and the award-winning A View from the Bridge at the Young Vic.

Apart from the theatre, van Hove directed Thuisfront for Dutch television; his first cinematic film, Amsterdam, came out in 2009. Van Hove directed the musical Rent for Joop van den Ende. At the Vlaamse Opera, he staged a production of Alban Berg's opera Lulu, as well as the complete Ring Cycle by Richard Wagner (2006–08). He put on a production of Janáček's De Zaak Makropoulos, and Tchaikovsky's Iolanta for the De Nederlandse Opera in Amsterdam. From 1998 until 2004, van Hove was festival manager of the Holland Festival, where he presented an annual selection of international theatre, music, opera and dance.

From 2001 to 2023, he was the general director of Internationaal Theater Amsterdam (formerly known as Toneelgroep Amsterdam), the prime theatre company of The Netherlands and the official municipal theatre company of Amsterdam. Van Hove's international focus explains why the company has been invited by international festivals such as Ruhrtriennale, Vienna Festival, the Edinburgh Festival and Festival d'Avignon, and performs in the United States, Russia and Australia, and why well-known directors such as Christoph Marthaler, Krzysztof Warlikowski, Johan Simons, Thomas Ostermeier, Luk Perceval, Simon Stone and Katie Mitchell have joined the troupe as guest directors. For Toneelgroep Amsterdam van Hove has directed Angels in America by Tony Kushner, the marathon performance Roman Tragedies (based on Shakespearean works), Opening Night by John Cassavetes, Rocco and his Brothers by Luchino Visconti, and Teorema (based on the work of Pier Paolo Pasolini, in partnership with the Ruhrtriennale), Antonioni-Project in tribute to Michelangelo Antonioni, La voix humaine (The Human Voice) by Jean Cocteau, Summer Trilogy in tribute to Carlo Goldoni, Children of the Sun by Maxim Gorky, The Miser by Molière, Scenes from a Marriage, Cries and Whispers and After the Rehearsal / Persona by Ingmar Bergman, And We'll Never Be Parted by Jon Fosse, The Russians! by Tom Lanoye, based on Chekhov's Ivanov & Platanov plays, The Fountainhead by Ayn Rand, Mary Stuart by Friedrich Schiller, Kings of War (based on Henry V, Henry IV, Part 2, Henry VI, and Richard III by William Shakespeare), The Hidden Force by Louis Couperus and The Other Voice by Ramsey Nasr.

In 2015, van Hove made his Broadway debut with a production of Arthur Miller's A View from the Bridge, which won Tony Awards for Best Revival of a Play and Best Direction of a Play. He also directed Broadway productions of Arthur Miller's The Crucible (2016), a stage adaptation of the 1976 film Network starring Bryan Cranston (2018), and a 2020 revival of West Side Story.

In 2023, van Hove was placed on leave as director of Internationaal Theater Amsterdam amid allegations that bullying and harassment were becoming prevalent throughout the company. A full investigation was commissioned, which concluded in 2024 with Van Hove's permanent departure from the theatre and the resignation of its supervisory board; the report found that a "culture of fear" had become entrenched during Van Hove's leadership.

In 2024, van Hove became director of the Ruhrtriennale.

In 2025, van Howe directed "All My Sons" by Arthur Miller, starring Bryan Cranston as Joe Keller and Marianne Jean-Baptiste as Kate Keller. All three of whom were nominated for respective awards at the 2026 Olivier Awards. Paapa Essiedu, who played Chris Keller, won the Olivier Award for Best Actor in a Supporting Role.

== Philosophy ==
Van Hove's signature style is an ultra-modern minimalism shot through with an expressionist theatricality. In an interview with Kate Kellaway, he commented

I don’t know what "being faithful to a text" means. There’s not one truth. As a director or actor, you have to give an interpretation of a line. I get 10 different people to say "I love you" – three words, an objective truth – and yet each time it is spoken it is different. I’m known for my preparation. For actors, this is not a threat, it is freedom. I like to create the world in which the text will blossom best.

He has said in numerous interviews that he approves of Ben Brantley's designation of him as a 'maximalist minimalist'.

He is regularly cited as an influence on many of the foremost names in a younger generation of theatre makers, including Sam Gold, Simon Stone and Robert Icke, all of whom he has invited to direct at Toneelgroep Amsterdam.

== Personal life ==
Van Hove is openly gay. His longtime partner since circa 1980 is set designer Jan Versweyveld.

== Accusations ==
In 2023, the Internationaal Theater Amsterdam (ITA) ended its collaboration with Van Hove following two external investigations. Van Hove was accused of physical and psychological violence and of having contributed to a climate conducive to sexual harassment, verbal harassment, and physical violence.

== Productions ==
=== Broadway productions ===
- 2015: A View from the Bridge by Arthur Miller, Lyceum Theatre, Broadway
- 2016: The Crucible by Arthur Miller, Walter Kerr Theatre, Broadway
- 2018: Network by Lee Hall, Belasco Theatre, Broadway
- 2020: West Side Story at the Broadway Theatre, Broadway

=== International productions ===
- 1993: Die Bakchen (The Bacchae) by Euripides at Deutsches Schauspielhaus, Hamburg
- 1995: Gier unter Ulmen (Desire Under the Elms) by Eugene O'Neill at Staatstheater Stuttgart
- 1996: More Stately Mansions by Eugene O'Neill at the New York Theatre Workshop
- 1998: A Streetcar Named Desire by Tennessee Williams at the New York Theatre Workshop
- 2000: Alice in Bed by Susan Sontag at the New York Theatre Workshop (co-production with Zuidelijk Toneel and Holland Festival)
- 2004: Hedda Gabler by Henrik Ibsen at the New York Theatre Workshop
- 2005: Faces by John Cassavetes at Theater der Welt; co-production with Deutsches Schauspielhaus, Hamburg, and Staatstheater Stuttgart
- 2006: Der Geizige (The Miser) by Molière at Deutsches Schauspielhaus, Hamburg
- 2007: The Misanthrope by Molière at the New York Theatre Workshop
- 2008: Kameliendame after La Dame aux Camélias by Alexandre Dumas, fils; coproduction TA / Deutsches Schauspielhaus, Hamburg
- 2010: The Little Foxes by Lillian Hellman at the New York Theatre Workshop; Der Menschenfeind (The Misanthrope) by Molière at Schaubühne Berlin
- 2011: Edward II by Christopher Marlowe at Schaubühne, Berlin; Ludwig II by Luchino Visconti at the Münchner Kammerspiele
- 2013: Seltsames Intermezzo by Eugene O'Neill at the Münchner Kammerspiele
- 2014: A View from the Bridge by Arthur Miller at the Young Vic; Scenes from a Marriage by Ingmar Bergman at the New York Theatre Workshop
- 2015: Antigone by Sophocles (Barbican, Les théâtres de la ville de Luxembourg and Toneelgroep Amsterdam);
  Lazarus by David Bowie and Enda Walsh, New York Theatre Workshop; 2016 at Kings Cross Theatre
- Hedda Gabler by Henrik Ibsen, Royal National Theatre, London; Les Damnés by Luchino Visconti, Comédie-Française, Paris
- 2017: The Fountainhead by Ayn Rand, Brooklyn Academy of Music, Gilman Opera House; Obsession by Luchino Visconti, Barbican;
  Network by Lee Hall, Royal National Theatre, London
- 2019: Electre/Oreste by Euripides at Comédie-Française, Paris; All About Eve at Noël Coward Theatre London;
- 2024: a new adaptation of John Cassavetes's Opening Night, created with Rufus Wainwright at Gielgud Theatre London

=== European productions ===
- Productions in Belgium and the Netherlands

==== Toneelgroep Amsterdam ====
- 2000–2001: True Love by Charles L. Mee (co-production with Holland Festival); The Massacre at Paris by Hafid Bouazza after Christopher Marlowe
- 2001–2002: Con Amore by Jef Aerts after L'incoronazione di Poppea by Monteverdi
- 2002–2003: Three Sisters by Anton Chekhov; Othello by William Shakespeare; Carmen by Oscar van Woensel after Prosper Mérimée and Georges Bizet
- 2003–2004: The Norman Conquests by Alan Ayckbourn (co-production with Holland Festival); Mourning Becomes Electra by Eugene O'Neill
- 2004–2005: The Taming of the Shrew by William Shakespeare; Scenes from a Marriage by Ingmar Bergman
- 2005–2006: Perfect Wedding by Charles L. Mee; Opening night by John Cassavetes; Hedda Gabler by Henrik Ibsen
- 2006–2007: Roman Tragedies by William Shakespeare
- 2007–2008: Angels in America by Tony Kushner
- 2008–2009: Antonioni Project after Michelangelo Antonioni; The Human Voice by Jean Cocteau
- 2009–2010: Teorema by Pier Paolo Pasolini; Summer Trilogy by Carlo Goldoni
- 2010–2011: Children of the Sun by Maxim Gorky; And We'll Never Be Parted by Jon Fosse; The Russians! by Tom Lanoye
- 2011–2012: The Miser by Molière; Husbands by John Cassavetes
- 2012–2013: After the Rehearsal by Ingmar Bergman; Persona by Ingmar Bergman
- 2013–2014: The Fountainhead by Ayn Rand; Long Day's Journey into Night by Eugene O'Neill
- 2014–2015: Kings of War by William Shakespeare; 2016 at the Brooklyn Academy of Music, New York City; Mary Stuart by Friedrich Schiller; Song from Far Away by Simon Stephens
- 2015–2016: The Other Voice by Ramsey Nasr; The Hidden Force by Louis Couperus
- 2016–2017: The Things that Pass by Louis Couperus; Obsession after Luchino Visconti; Diary of the One who Disappeared by Leoš Janáček

==== Zuidelijk Toneel ====
- 1988–1989: Rouw siert Electra (Mourning Becomes Electra) by Eugene 0'Neill
- 1990–1991: Ajax/Antigone by Sophocles; Het Zuiden (South) by Julien Green
- 1991–1992: Het Begeren onder de Olmen (Desire Under the Elms) by Eugene O'Neill; Toch zonde van die hoer ('Tis Pity She's a Whore) by John Ford
- 1992–1993: Hamlet by William Shakespeare (co-production with Antwerp European Cultural Capital 1993); Gered (Saved) by Edward Bond
- 1993–1994: Rijkemanshuis (More Stately Mansions) by Eugene O'Neill (co-production with Holland Festival)
- 1994–1995: De tramlijn die Verlangen heet (A Streetcar Named Desire) by Tennessee Williams; Splendid's by Jean Genet
- 1995–1996: Caligula by Albert Camus
- 1996–1997: Koppen (Faces) by John Cassavetes (co-production with Holland Festival); De onbeminden (Les Mal Aimés) by François Mauriac
- 1997–1998: Romeo en Julia (studie van een verdrinkend lichaam) (Romeo and Juliet: A study of a drowning body) by Peter Verhelst after Shakespeare (co-production with Holland Festival)
- 1998–1999: India Song by Marguerite Duras (co-production with Holland Festival)
- 1999–2000: Alice in Bed by Susan Sontag (co-production with New York Theatre Workshop and Holland Festival); De dame met de camelia's (La Dame aux camélias) by Alexandre Dumas

==== Theater van het Oosten ====
- 1989–1990: Richard II by William Shakespeare

==== De Tijd ====
- 1987–1988: In de eenzaamheid van de katoenvelden (Dans la solitude des champs de coton) by Bernard-Marie Koltès; Macbeth by William Shakespeare
- 1988–1989: Don Carlos by Friedrich von Schiller
- 1989–1990: Jakow Bogomolow by Maxim Gorky; Lulu by Frank Wedekind (co-production with Toneelgroep Amsterdam)

==== Akt/Vertikaal ====
- 1984–1985: India Song by Marguerite Duras; Wonderen der mensheid (Miracles of Humanity) (group project); Wilde heren (Wild Men) (group project)
- 1985–1986: Russische Openbaring (Russian Gambit) by Heiner Müller; ImitatieS (ImitationS) (group project)
- 1986–1987: Bacchanten (The Bacchae) by Euripides

==== Vertikaal ====
- 1982–1983: De Lijfknecht (The Servant) by Harold Pinter

==== Akt ====
- 1981–1982: Ziektekiemen (Germs) by Ivo van Hove; Geruchten (Rumours) by Ivo van Hove
- 1982–1983: Als in de oorlog (Like in the War) by Sophocles/Gie Laenen (as part of Europalia)
- 1983–1984: Marokko (Morocco) by Botho Strauss; Agatha by Marguerite Duras

== Work ==
=== Opera ===
- 1999: Lulu by Alban Berg (after Frank Wedekind), Flemish Opera, Antwerp
- 2002: The Makropulos Case by Leoš Janáček, De Nederlandse Opera, Amsterdam
- 2004: Iolanta by Tchaikovsky, De Nederlandse Opera, Amsterdam
- 2006–2008: Der Ring des Nibelungen by Richard Wagner, Flemish Opera, Antwerp
- 2010: Idomeneo, re di Creta by Mozart, De Munt Opera, Brussels
- 2012: Macbeth by Giuseppe Verdi, Opéra National de Lyon
- 2012: Der Schatzgräber by Franz Schreker, De Nederlandse Opera, Amsterdam
- 2013: La clemenza di Tito by Wolfgang Amadeus Mozart, De Munt Opera, Brussels
- 2013: Mazeppa by Pyotr Ilyich Tchaikovsky, Komische Oper Berlin
- 2014: Brokeback Mountain, libretto by Annie Proulx, music by Charles Wuorinen, Teatro Real, Madrid
- 2017: Salome by Richard Strauss, Dutch National Opera, Amsterdam
- 2018: Boris Godunov by Modest Mussorgsky, Opéra Bastille, Paris
- 2019: Don Giovanni by Wolfgang Amadeus Mozart, Opéra Bastille, Paris
- 2022: Aufstieg und Fall der Stadt Mahagonny by Kurt Weill, Flemish Opera, Antwerp/Ghent

=== Musical ===
- 2000: Rent by Jonathan Larson with Joop van den Ende Theatre Productions
- 2015: Lazarus by David Bowie and Enda Walsh with New York Theatre Workshop
- 2020: West Side Story by Arthur Laurents, Leonard Bernstein, and Stephen Sondheim

=== Film/television ===
1997: Thuisfront (Home Front) (NPS) by Peter van Kraaij (co-production with Zuidelijk Toneel) 2008: Amsterdam by Jeroen Planting

== Awards and honours ==
Van Hove won two Obie Awards for Best Production of an off-Broadway production in New York (for More Stately Mansions and Hedda Gabler, respectively), as well as the East Flanders Oeuvre Prize (1995), the Theatre Festival Prize (1996), and the Archangel Award at the Edinburgh Festival (1999).

He was made a Knight of the Ordre des Arts et des Lettres in France in 2004. In 2007 he received the Prijs van de Kritiek in the Netherlands, a prize awarded by theatre critics. In 2008, he received the Prosceniumprijs, a Dutch theatre prize, together with Jan Versweyveld and in 2012 the Amsterdam Business Oeuvre Award. In 2014, van Hove received an honorary doctorate for general merit of the University of Antwerp.

In 2015, he won a Best Director Laurence Olivier Award for A View From the Bridge at the Young Vic and Wyndham's Theatre in London and the Critics' Circle Theatre Award for Best Director. Van Hove also won the Amsterdam Award for the Arts 2015, with Jan Versweyveld. In that same year he also received the IJ award by the city of Amsterdam.

In 2016 van Hove received The Founders Award for Excellence in Directing and became Honorary Citizen of Ham, Belgium. A View from the Bridge at the Lyceum Theatre was nominated for the Drama Desk Award for Best Revival and Best Director and the Outer Critics Circle Award for Best Director and Best Revival, and won the Tony Award for Best Director and Best Revival. The Crucible at the Walter Kerr Theatre was nominated for the Outer Critics Circle Award for Best Revival and the Tony Award for Best Revival. Vu du Pont at Théâtre de l'Odéon was nominated for Molières for Best Director and Best Revival.

In 2016, van Hove was made a Commander in the Order of the Crown.

Other awards:

- 1987: Oscar de Gruyter Prize for Best Direction (for Macbeth)
- 1994: Publieks (Audience) Prize for Rijkemanshuis
- 1996: Theatre Festival Prize for Caligula
- 1998: Herald Angel at the Edinburgh Festival, for More Stately Mansions
- 1999: Johan Fleerackers Prize for collaboration between Dutch and Flemish theatre; Arch Angel for best direction at the Edinburgh Festival, for India Song (after Marguerite Duras' film, India Song)
