= Jan Versweyveld =

Belgian scenic designer

- Born: 1958 (age 67–68); Belgium
- Occupations: Theatre set designer, scenographer, lighting designer
- Partner: Ivo van Hove

Jan Versweyveld (born 1958) is a Belgian theatre set designer, scenographer and lighting designer.

== Biography ==
Jan Versweyveld studied at the LUCA School of Arts in Brussels and the Royal Academy of Fine Arts in Antwerp. Together with his husband Ivo van Hove, whom he met in 1980, he created two theatre groups in the early 1980s: "Akt/Vertikaal" and "Toneelproducties De Tijd". Versweyveld then started working as scenographer for the Zuidelijk Toneel in Eindhoven in 1990, with Ivo van Hove as the director of the company.

In 2001 he became the head of scenography and the main designer for Toneelgroep Amsterdam. Versweyveld has been a scenographer for dance company Rosas and for opera houses including La Monnaie, Palais Garnier, the Vlaamse Opera and the Dutch National Opera, and a guest lecturer at the Gerrit Rietveld Academie.

Apart from his work for the Zuidelijk Toneel and the Toneelgroep Amsterdam, he has also worked for many international theatres, including the New York Theatre Workshop, Teatro Real in Spain, the Companhia Nacional do Bailado in Portugal, the Deutsches Schauspielhaus, the Munich Kammerspiele and the Schaubühne (Germany), Odéon-Théâtre de l'Europe and Comédie-Française in France, the Grand Theatre, Warsaw in Poland, and the Royal National Theatre, Wyndham's Theatre and the Young Vic in the UK.

Versweyveld was also the set and lighting designer for Lazarus, the musical by David Bowie and Ivo van Hove, and for Network, the play by Lee Hall. Since 2005, he also works as a photographer.

In 2019 he was the scenographer for Camp: Notes on Fashion, the yearly Met Gala Exhibition at the Anna Wintour Costume Center.

== Awards ==
- Bessie Award for Drumming Live (a dance performance by Anne Teresa De Keersmaeker)
- Obie Award for Hedda Gabler
- 2008: Prosceniumprijs, together with Ivo van Hove
- 2015: Amsterdam Award for the Arts, together with Ivo van Hove
- 2015: Lucille Lortel Award for Outstanding Scenic Design for Scenes From a Marriage
- 2016: Knight of Illumination Award for Song from Far Away
- 2016: New York Drama Critics' Circle Award Special Citation (for collaborative achievement in direction and design), together with Ivo van Hove
- 2017: Molière Award for Visual Cration for Les Damès

=== Nominations ===
- 2015: Laurence Olivier Award for Best Lighting Design and Laurence Olivier Award for Best Set Design for A View from the Bridge at the Young Vic
- 2016: Tony Award for Best Scenic Design in a Play for A View from the Bridge at the Lyceum Theatre (Broadway)
- 2016: Tony Award for Best Lighting Design in a Play for A View from the Bridge, and for The Crucible
- 2018: Laurence Olivier Award for Best Lighting Design for Network at the National Theatre
- 2019: Tony Award for Best Scenic Design in a Play for Network
- 2019: Tony Award for Best Lighting Design in a Play, with Tal Yarden, for Network
