= Bryan Cranston on stage and screen =

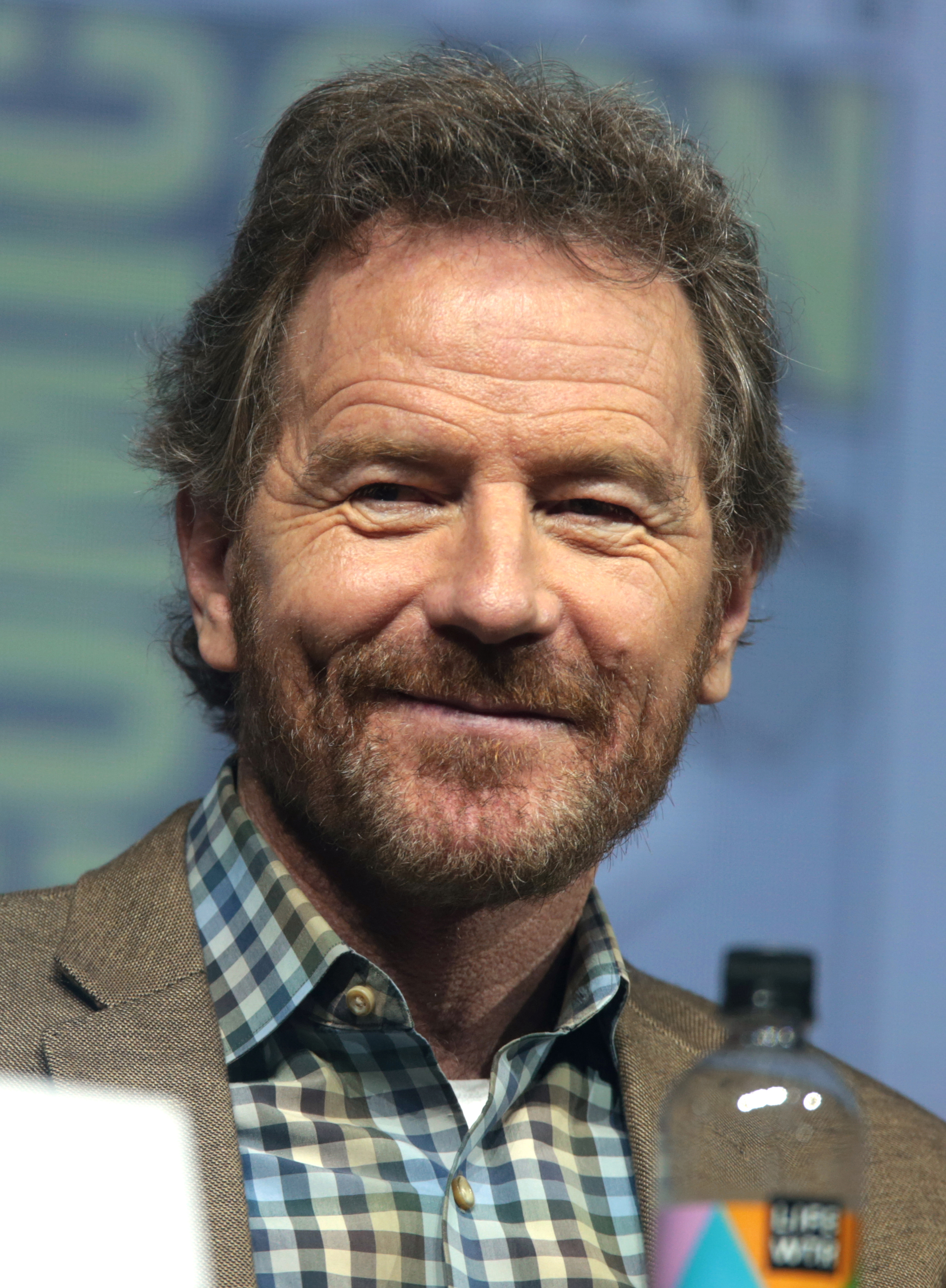
- Cranston at the 2018 San Diego Comic-Con
- Film: 62
- Television series: 96
- Web series: 2
- Music videos: 5
- Theatre: 8
- Others: 2 video games

Bryan Cranston is an American actor, who has appeared in films, television series, stage plays and video games.

Cranston started his career with supporting roles on television before his breakout comedic role as Hal in the Fox sitcom Malcolm in the Middle (2000–2006) for which he was nominated for the Primetime Emmy Award for Outstanding Supporting Actor in a Comedy Series. He gained stardom for his dramatic leading role playing Walter White in the AMC crime drama series Breaking Bad (2008–2013) for which he won the Outstanding Lead Actor in a Drama Series four times (2008, 2009, 2010, and 2014). He was Emmy-nominated for All the Way (2016) and Curb Your Enthusiasm (2018). Cranston acted in the crime drama series Sneaky Pete (2015–2019), and the drama series Your Honor (2020–2023).

He took supporting roles in the musical comedy That Thing You Do! (1996), the war drama Saving Private Ryan (1998), the road comedy Little Miss Sunshine (2006), the action drama Drive (2011), the medical thriller Contagion (2011), the jukebox musical Rock of Ages (2012), the espionage thriller Argo (2012) and the monster film Godzilla (2014). He portrayed Dalton Trumbo in the biographical drama Trumbo (2015) for which he was nominated for the Academy Award, BAFTA Award, Golden Globe Award, and Actor Award for Best Actor in a Leading Role. He then took leading roles in the crime drama The Infiltrator (2016), the comedy Why Him? (2016), the comedy drama The Upside (2017), the war dramedy Last Flag Flying (2017), and the comedy Jerry & Marge Go Large (2022). He also collaborated with Wes Anderson acting in Isle of Dogs (2018), Asteroid City (2023), and The Phoenician Scheme (2025).

On stage, Cranston acted in productions at the Shakespeare Santa Cruz and the Geffen Playhouse. Cranston made his Broadway debut playing United States President Lyndon B. Johnson in the play All the Way (2013) for which he won the Tony Award for Best Actor in a Play. He played fictional news anchor Howard Beale in the historical play Network in both the 2017 West End production and the 2019 Broadway production, winning both the Laurence Olivier Award for Best Actor and his second Tony Award for Best Actor in a Play.

== Film ==
Key
†	Denotes films that have not yet been released

Year	Title	Role	Notes
1981	The Call of the Wild: Howl Buck	Manuel / Pete	Voice; English dub
1982	Treasure Planet	Filipe	Voice; English dub
1987	Amazon Women on the Moon	Paramedic #1	Segment: "Roast Your Loved One"
1987	Royal Space Force: The Wings of Honnêamise	Matti Tohn	Voice; English dub; credited as Lee Stone
1988	The Big Turnaround	Jim	
1990	Corporate Affairs	Darren	
1991	Dead Space	Dr. Frank Darden	
1994	Erotique	Dr. Robert Stern	
1994	Drunken Master II	Fo-sang	Voice; English dub
1994	Clean Slate	Club Official	
1994	Street Fighter II: The Animated Movie	Fei Long	Voice; English dub; credited as Phil Williams
1994	Macross Plus: International Version	Isamu Alva Dyson	Voice; English dub
1995	Armitage III	Eddie Barrows	Voice; English dub; credited as Lee Stone
1996	That Thing You Do!	Gus Grissom	
1996	Street Corner Justice	Father Brophy	
1997	Time Under Fire	Braddock	
1997	Strategic Command	Phil Hertzberg	Direct-to-video
1998	Saving Private Ryan	War Department Colonel	
1999	Last Chance	Lance	Also writer, director and producer
2000	The Big Thing	Roberto Montalban	
2000	Terror Tract	Ron Gatley	Segment: "Bobo"
2001	Ramayana: The Legend of Prince Rama	Lord Rama	Voice; English dub
2004	Seeing Other People	Peter	
2004	Illusion	David	
2005	Magnificent Desolation: Walking on the Moon 3D	Buzz Aldrin	Voice; Documentary
2006	Little Miss Sunshine	Stan Grossman	
2006	Intellectual Property	CSE Radio Host	
2007	Hard Four	Lieutenant Bryce Baxter	
2010	Love Ranch	James Pettis	
2011	The Lincoln Lawyer	Detective Lankford	
2011	Drive	Shannon	
2011	Detachment	Richard Dearden	
2011	Leave	Eliot	
2011	Larry Crowne	Dean Tainot	
2011	Batman: Year One	James Gordon	Voice; Direct-to-video
2011	Contagion	Rear Admiral Lyle Haggerty	
2012	Red Tails	Major William Mortamus	
2012	John Carter	Colonel Powell	
2012	Madagascar 3: Europe's Most Wanted	Vitaly	Voice
2012	Rock of Ages	Mayor Mike Whitmore	
2012	Total Recall	Chancellor Vilos Cohaagen	
2012	Argo	CIA Deputy Director Jack O'Donnell	
2013	Cold Comes the Night	"Topo" Topolewski	
2013	Writer's Block	The Writer	Short film
2014	Godzilla	Joe Brody	
2015	Trumbo	Dalton Trumbo	
2016	Kung Fu Panda 3	Li	Voice
2016	Get a Job	Roger Davis	
2016	The Infiltrator	US Customs Special Agent Robert Mazur / Bob Musella	Also executive producer
2016	Wakefield	Howard Wakefield	
2016	In Dubious Battle	Sheriff	
2016	Why Him?	Ned Fleming	
2017	The Disaster Artist	Himself	Uncredited cameo
2017	Power Rangers	Zordon	
2017	The Upside	Phillip Lacasse	
2017	Last Flag Flying	Sal Nealon	
2018	Isle of Dogs	Chief	Voice
2019	El Camino: A Breaking Bad Movie	Walter White	
2020	The One and Only Ivan	Mack	
2020	Ancient Caves	The Narrator	Voice; Documentary short
2022	Sell/Buy/Date	Himself	Documentary
2022	Jerry & Marge Go Large	Jerry Selbee	
2023	Asteroid City	The Host	
2024	Argylle	Ritter	
2024	Kung Fu Panda 4	Li	Voice
2024	Moscow Mule	Himself	Short film
2025	The Phoenician Scheme	Reagan	
2025	Everything's Going to Be Great	Buddy Smart	
2026	Chili Finger	Dave	
2026	The Sheep Detectives	Sebastian	Voice
2026	Tangles	Rob	Voice
TBA	Lone Wolf †	TBA	Post-production

== Television ==
Year	Title	Role	Notes
1980	To Race the Wind	Quarterback	Television film; uncredited
1982	Crisis Counselor	Sam	Episode: "Bisexual Marriage"
1982	CHiPs	Billy Joe	Episode: "Return to Death's Door"
1983–1985	Loving	Douglas Donovan	
1985	Cover Up	Frank Lawler / Tommy Maynard	Episode: "Who's Trying to Kill Miss Globe?"
1985	One Life to Live	Dean Stella	
1986	Airwolf	Robert Hollis	Episode: "Desperate Monday"
1986	North and South: Book II	Colonel Austin	Episode: "March 1865–April 1865"
1986–1996	Murder, She Wrote	Brian East / Jerry Wilber / Parker Foreman	3 episodes
1987	The Return of the Six Million Dollar Man and the Bionic Woman	Dr. Shepherd	Television film
1987	Hill Street Blues	PBA Counselor	Episode: "A Pound of Flesh"
1987–1991	Matlock	Brian Emerson / Dr. Harding Fletcher	2 episodes
1988	Raising Miranda	Uncle Russell	9 episodes
1989	Falcon Crest	Martin Randall	Episode: "Enquiring Minds"
1989	Baywatch	Tom Logan	Episode: "Cruise Ship"
1989	I Know My First Name Is Steven	Officer Dickenson	Miniseries
1990	Hull High	Mr. McConnell	Episode: "#1.8"
1990	Jake and the Fatman	Lyle Wicks / Jason Miller	Episode: "Exactly Like You"
1990	Capital News	Congressman Marple	Episode: "Blues for Mr. White"
1991	The Flash	Philip "Mark" Moses	Episode: "Be My Baby"
1991	Dead Silence	Professor Harris	Television film
1992	L.A. Law	James Phillips	Episode: "All About Sleaze"
1993	The Disappearance of Nora	Police Detective	Television film
1993	Prophet of Evil: The Ervil Lebaron Story	Lawyer	Television film
1993	Moldiver	Tech	English dub
1993	Mighty Morphin Power Rangers	Twinman / Snizard	Voice; 2 episodes
1993	Super Dimension Century Orguss 02	Imperial Officer	Voice; English dub
1994	Tekkaman Blade	Sergeant Miles O'Rourke	Voice; English dub
1994	Macross Plus	Isamu Alva Dyson	Voice; English dub
1994	Viper	Garrett Berlin	Episode: "Wheels of Fire"
1994	Walker, Texas Ranger	Hank Mease	Episode: "Deadly Vision"
1994	Days Like This	Benny	Pilot
1994	Men Who Hate Women & the Women Who Love Them	David	Television film
1994	The Companion	Alan	Television film
1994–97	Seinfeld	Dr. Tim Whatley	5 episodes
1995	Touched by an Angel	Dr. Tom Bryant	Episode: "The Hero"
1995	Brotherly Love	Russell Winslow	Episode: "Such a Bargain"
1995	Land's End	Matt McCulla	2 episodes
1995	Nowhere Man	Sheriff Norman Wade	Episode: "The Alpha Spike"
1995	Extreme Blue	Ned Landry	Pilot
1995	Kissing Miranda	Special Agent Falsey	Television film
1996	The Louie Show	Curt Sincic	6 episodes
1996	The Rockford Files: Punishment and Crime	Patrick Dougherty	Television film
1996–1997	Eagle Riders	Joe Thax	Voice; English dub
1996–1998	Diagnosis: Murder	Walter Mason / Martin Rutgers	2 episodes
1997	Moloney	Unknown role	Episode: "Clarity Begins at Home"
1997	Babylon 5	Ericsson	Episode: "The Long Night"
1997	Dogs	Unknown role	Pilot
1997	Goode Behavior	Record Executive	Episode: "Goode Music"
1997	Sabrina the Teenage Witch	Witch Lawyer	Episode: "Troll Bride"
1997	Pearl	Isaac Perlow	Episode: "My So-Called Real Life"
1997	Total Security	Jason Nichols	Episode: "Wet Side Story"
1997	Alright Already	Robert	Episode: "Again with the Pilot"
1998	Brooklyn South	IAB Lieutenant Gordon Denton	2 episodes
1998	From the Earth to the Moon	Buzz Aldrin	2 episodes
1998	V.I.P.	Colt Arrow	Episode: "Beats Working at a Hot Dog Stand"
1998	The X-Files	Patrick Crump	Episode: "Drive"
1998	Chicago Hope	Jesus	Episode: "Tantric Turkey"
1998	Working	Larry Prince	Episode: "The Consultant"
1998	Honey, I Shrunk the Kids: The TV Show	Ronald "Cheesy" Meezy	Episode: "Honey, I'm the Sorcerer's Apprentice"
1999	3rd Rock from the Sun	Neil Diamond Impersonator	Episode: "Paranoid Dick"
1999	The Pretender	Neil Roberts	Episode: "PTB"
1999–2001	The King of Queens	Tim Sacksky	4 episodes
2000–2001	Clerks: The Animated Series	Various roles	Voice; 3 episodes
2000–2006	Malcolm in the Middle	Hal	151 episodes
2001	Gary & Mike	Mr. Newton / Senator Howard Bilson	Voice; 4 episodes
2001	'Twas the Night	Nick Wrigley	Television film
2001	The Santa Claus Brothers	Santa Claus	Voice; television film
2003	National Lampoon's Thanksgiving Family Reunion	Woodrow Snider	Television film
2003–2006	Lilo & Stitch: The Series	Mr. Jameson	Voice; 6 episodes
2005–2010	American Dad!	Bill Publisherman / Mr. Winthrop	Voice; 2 episodes
2006–2020	Family Guy	Hal / Dr. Jewish / Himself / Bert	Voice; 10 episodes
2006–2013	How I Met Your Mother	Hammond Druthers	3 episodes
2007	Fallen	Lucifer / The Light Bringer	3 episodes
2007	Thank God You're Here	British Rock Star / Alien Superhero	Episode: "#1.1"
2008	The Hollywood Quad	Burton Melrose	Pilot
2008–2013	Breaking Bad	Walter "Walt" White / Heisenberg	62 episodes; also producer
2010–2011	Glenn Martin, DDS	Drake Stone	Voice; 2 episodes
2010–2016	Saturday Night Live	Himself (host) / Walter White	2 episodes
2011	The Handlers	Jack Powers	8 episodes; also writer and executive producer
2011–2018	Robot Chicken	Various roles	Voice; 5 episodes
2012	Archer	Commander Tony Drake	Voice; 2 episodes
2012	30 Rock	Ron	Episode: "Governor Dunston"
2012–2013	The Simpsons	Stradivarius Cain / Walter White	Voice; 2 episodes
2012–2013	The Cleveland Show	Dr. Fist / Various roles	Voice; 9 episodes
2013	Big History	The Narrator	Voice; 17 episodes
2015–19	Sneaky Pete	Vince Lonigan	10 episodes; also co-creator, writer and executive producer
2015–19	SuperMansion	Titanium Rex	Voice; 46 episodes; also executive producer
2015–2026	The Late Show with Stephen Colbert	Himself	14 episodes, including the series finale
2016	All the Way	Lyndon B. Johnson	Television film; also executive producer
2017	Philip K. Dick's Electric Dreams	Silas Herrick	Episode: "Human Is"; also executive producer
2017	Curb Your Enthusiasm	Dr. Lionel Templeton	Episode: "Running with the Bulls"
2018	The Dangerous Book for Boys	—N/a	6 episodes; Co-creator, writer and executive producer
2019	Last Week Tonight with John Oliver	Richard Sackler	Episode: "Opioids II"
2020	Home Movie: The Princess Bride	Count Rugen	Episode: "Chapter Ten: To the Pain!"
2020	The Stand	The President of the United States	Uncredited voice; episode: "The End"
2020–2023	Your Honor	Judge Michael Desiato	20 episodes; also executive producer
2021	Animal	Narrator	Voice; episode: "Dogs"
2022	Better Call Saul	Walter "Walt" White / Heisenberg	Episodes: "Breaking Bad", "Saul Gone"
2022	America's Game: The Super Bowl Champions	Narrator	Voice; episode: "2021 Rams"
2023	It's Always Sunny in Philadelphia	"Mr. Middle" / Himself (Note: Cranston portrays a parodic fictionalised version of himself simply referred to as "Mr. Middle" (after the television series Malcolm in the Middle, in which he had starred as Hal), who has a relationally aggressive interpersonal relationship with his co-star "Malcolm", paralleling that of Mac and Dennis Reynolds.)	Episode: "Celebrity Booze: The Ultimate Cash Grab"
2025	The Studio	Griffin Mill	3 episodes
2026	Malcolm in the Middle: Life's Still Unfair	Hal	4 episodes; also executive producer

== Theater ==
Year	Title	Role	Playwright	Venue	Notes	Ref.
	Barefoot in the Park	Paul Bratter	Neil Simon	Granada Theatre	Santa Barbara	
1987	The Steve Weed Show	Performer	Shawn Schepps	Zephyr Theatre	Los Angeles	
2006	The God of Hell	Welch	Sam Shepard	Geffen Playhouse	Los Angeles	
2007	Chapter Two	George Schneider	Neil Simon	Pollak Theatre	New Jersey	
2014	All the Way	Lyndon B. Johnson	Robert Schenkkan	American Repertory Theater	Cambridge	
2014	All the Way	Lyndon B. Johnson	Robert Schenkkan	Neil Simon Theatre	Broadway	
2017	Network	Howard Beale	Lee Hall	Royal National Theatre	London	
2019	Network	Howard Beale	Lee Hall	Belasco Theatre	Broadway	
2022	Power of Sail	Charles Nichols	Paul Grellong	Geffen Playhouse	Los Angeles	
2026	All My Sons	Joe Keller	Arthur Miller	Wyndham's Theatre	West End	
2027	All My Sons	Joe Keller	Arthur Miller	August Wilson Theatre	Broadway	

== As director ==
Year	Title	Notes
2003–2006	Malcolm in the Middle	7 episodes: "Stereo Store", "Vegas", "Dirty Magazine", "Experiment", "Buseys Run Away", "Billboard", "Malcolm Defends Reese"
2006	Big Day	Episode: "Stolen Vows"
2006	Special Unit	Pilot
2009–2013	Breaking Bad	3 episodes: "Seven Thirty-Seven", "No Más", "Blood Money"
2012–2013	Modern Family	2 episodes: "Election Day", "The Old Man & the Tree"
2012	The Office	Episode: "Work Bus"
2017	Sneaky Pete	Episode: "The Roll Over"
2021	Your Honor	Episode: "Part Ten"

== Video games ==
Year	Title	Role	Notes
2012	Madagascar 3: The Video Game	Vitaly	Voice
2014	Family Guy: The Quest for Stuff	Himself	Voice; Mobile game

== Music videos ==
Year	Title	Artist(s)	Role	Ref.
2002	"Boss of Me"	They Might Be Giants	Hal	
2013	"Clouds" (celebrity music video)	Zach Sobiech	Himself	
2016	"Neverland"	Zendaya	Himself	
2021	"Memories"	Evan Stanley	The Man	
2024	"Electric Energy"	Ariana DeBose, Boy George and Nile Rodgers	Himself	

== Commercials ==
Year	Title	Brand	Role	Notes
1999	"Honda Accord"	Honda Accord	Dr. Eugene Johnson	
2014	"Barely Legal Pawn"	Audi	Himself	
2015	"Sorta You"	Esurance	Walter White	Super Bowl ad
2020	"As Good as the Original"	Mountain Dew Zero	Jack Torrance	Super Bowl ad
2023	"Break into Something Good"	PopCorners	Walter White	Super Bowl ad
2024	"Breaking Bad Habits"	New Mexico Environment Department	Walter White	
