= List of awards and nominations received by Bryan Cranston =

Bryan Cranston awards and nominations
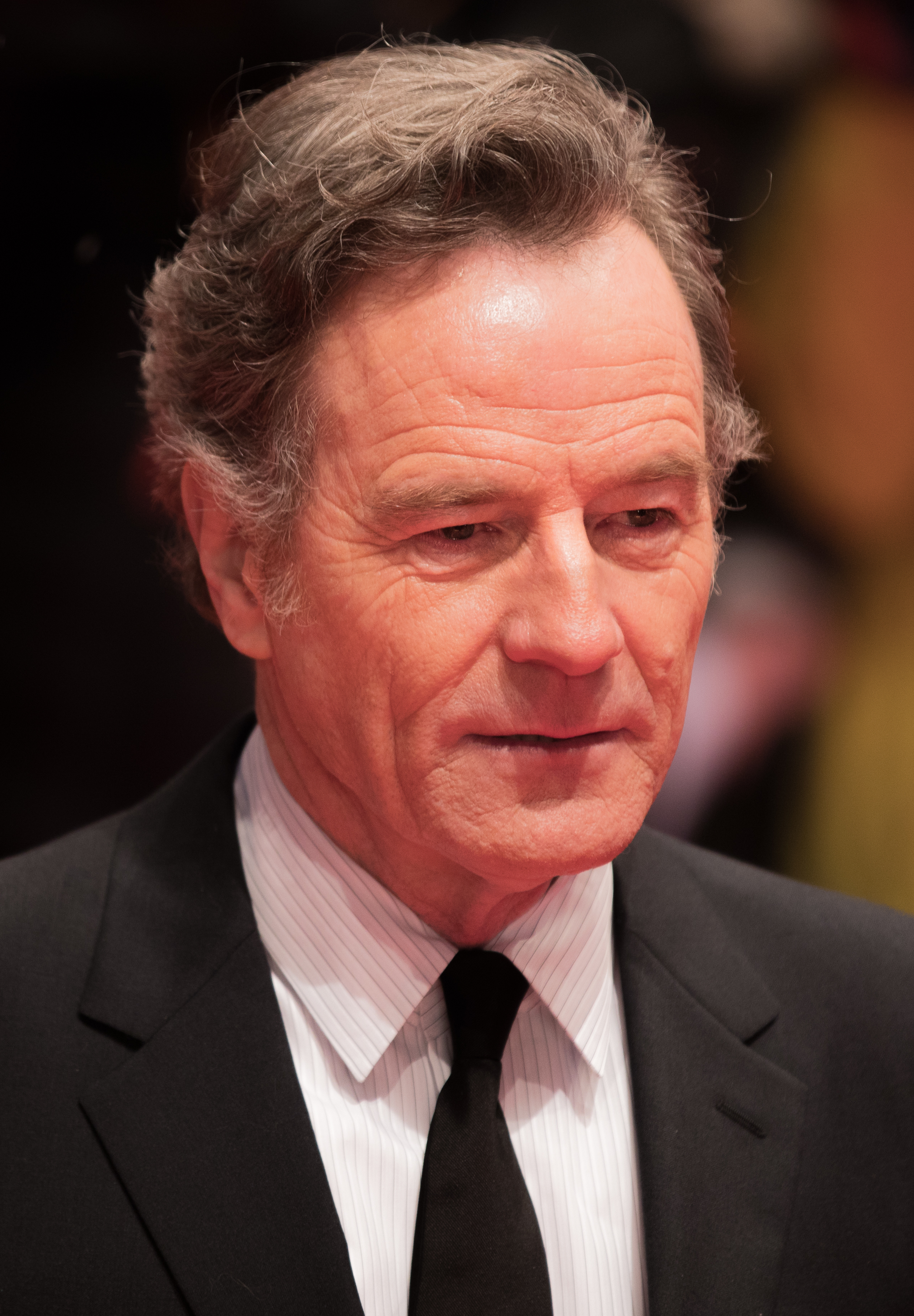
- Cranston at the Berlinale in 2018
Awards and nominations
Award	Wins	Nominations
Academy Awards	0	1
Actor Awards	5	12
BAFTA Awards	0	1
Critics' Choice	2	5
Golden Globe Awards	1	8
Emmy Awards	7	16
Laurence Olivier Awards	1	2
Tony Awards	2	2

Totals (Note: Certain award groups do not simply award one winner. They acknowledge several different recipients, have runners-up, and have third place. Since this is a specific recognition and is different from losing an award, runner-up mentions are considered wins in this award tally. For simplification and to avoid errors, each award in this list has been presumed to have had a prior nomination.)
- Wins: 32
- Nominations: 87

The following is a list of awards and nominations received by Bryan Cranston.

Bryan Cranston is an American actor. He is known for his diverse roles on stage and screen. Over his career he has received numerous accolades including a Golden Globe Award, seven Primetime Emmy Awards, five Actor Awards, a Laurence Olivier Award and two Tony Awards as well as nominations for an Academy Award and a BAFTA Award.

Cranston started his career playing the family patriarch Hal in the Fox sitcom Malcolm in the Middle (2000–2006) which earned him nominations for three Primetime Emmy Awards for Outstanding Supporting Actor in a Comedy Series. Cranston then earned acclaim for Walter White in AMC drama series Breaking Bad (2008–2013) earning six Primetime Emmy Awards, four for Outstanding Lead Actor in a Drama Series in 2008, 2009, 2010 and 2014 and two wins for Outstanding Drama Series in 2013 and 2014. The role also earned him a Golden Globe Award for Best Actor – Television Series Drama in 2014 and two Actor Award for Outstanding Performance by a Male Actor in a Drama Series

On stage, he made his Broadway debut portraying President Lyndon B. Johnson in the Robert Schenkkan political epic All the Way (2013) for which he earned the Tony Award for Best Actor in a Play. He reprised the role in the HBO movie of the same name in 2016 earning an Actor Award for Outstanding Performance by a Male Actor in a Miniseries or Television Movie and as well as a nomination for the Primetime Emmy Award for Outstanding Lead Actor in a Limited or Anthology Series or Movie and the Golden Globe Award for Best Actor – Miniseries or Television Film. He made his West End debut playing Howard Beale in the Lee Hall adaptation of Network (2019) for which he won the Laurence Olivier Award for Best Actor. For reprising the same role on Broadway, he won his second Tony Award for Best Actor in a Play.

On film, he portrayed screenwriter Dalton Trumbo in the Hollywood blacklist drama Trumbo (2015) for which he was nominated for several accolades including the Academy Award for Best Actor, the BAFTA Award for Best Actor in a Leading Role, the Golden Globe Award for Best Actor in a Motion Picture – Drama, and the Actor Award for Outstanding Performance by a Male Actor in a Leading Role.

== Major associations ==
=== Academy Awards ===
Year	Category	Nominated work	Result	Ref.
2016	Best Actor	Trumbo	Nominated	

=== Actor Awards ===
Year	Category	Nominated work	Result	Ref.
2010	Outstanding Performance by a Male Actor in a Drama Series	Breaking Bad	Nominated	
2011	Outstanding Performance by a Male Actor in a Drama Series	Breaking Bad	Nominated	
2012	Outstanding Performance by a Male Actor in a Drama Series	Breaking Bad	Nominated	
2012	Outstanding Performance by an Ensemble in a Drama Series	Breaking Bad	Nominated	
2013	Outstanding Performance by a Cast in a Motion Picture	Argo	Won	
2013	Outstanding Performance by an Ensemble in a Drama Series	Breaking Bad	Nominated	
2013	Outstanding Performance by a Male Actor in a Drama Series	Breaking Bad	Won	
2014	Outstanding Performance by a Male Actor in a Drama Series	Breaking Bad	Won	
2014	Outstanding Performance by an Ensemble in a Drama Series	Breaking Bad	Won	
2016	Outstanding Performance by a Male Actor in a Leading Role	Trumbo	Nominated	
2016	Outstanding Performance by a Cast in a Motion Picture	Trumbo	Nominated	
2017	Outstanding Performance by a Male Actor in a Miniseries or Television Movie	All the Way	Won	

=== BAFTA Awards ===
Year	Category	Nominated work	Result	Ref.
2016	Best Actor in a Leading Role	Trumbo	Nominated	

=== Critics' Choice Awards ===
Year	Category	Nominated work	Result	Ref.
Critics' Choice Movie Awards
2015	Best Actor	Trumbo	Nominated	
Critics' Choice Television Awards
2012	Best Television Drama Series Actor	Breaking Bad	Won	
2013	Best Television Drama Series Actor	Breaking Bad	Won	
2014	Best Television Drama Series Actor	Breaking Bad	Nominated	

=== Emmy Awards ===
Year	Category	Nominated work	Result	Ref.
Primetime Emmy Awards
2002	Outstanding Supporting Actor in a Comedy Series	Malcolm in the Middle (episode: "Poker" + "Monkey")	Nominated	
2003	Outstanding Supporting Actor in a Comedy Series	Malcolm in the Middle (episode: "Malcolm Holds His Tongue" + "Daycare")	Nominated	
2006	Outstanding Supporting Actor in a Comedy Series	Malcolm in the Middle (episode: "Hal Grieves" + "College Recruiters")	Nominated	
2008	Outstanding Lead Actor in a Drama Series	Breaking Bad (episode: "Pilot")	Won	
2009	Outstanding Lead Actor in a Drama Series	Breaking Bad (episode: "Phoenix")	Won	
2010	Outstanding Lead Actor in a Drama Series	Breaking Bad (episode: "Full Measure")	Won	
2012	Outstanding Drama Series	Breaking Bad (season 4)	Nominated	
2012	Outstanding Lead Actor in a Drama Series	Breaking Bad (episode: "Crawl Space")	Nominated	
2013	Outstanding Drama Series	Breaking Bad (season 5 - Part 1)	Won	
2013	Outstanding Lead Actor in a Drama Series	Breaking Bad (episode: "Say My Name")	Nominated	
2014	Outstanding Drama Series	Breaking Bad (season 5 - Part 2)	Won	
2014	Outstanding Lead Actor in a Drama Series	Breaking Bad (episode: "Ozymandias")	Won	
2016	Outstanding Lead Actor in a Limited Series or Movie	All the Way	Nominated	
2016	Outstanding Television Movie	All the Way	Nominated	
2018	Outstanding Guest Actor in a Comedy Series	Curb Your Enthusiasm (episode: "Running with the Bulls")	Nominated	
2025	Outstanding Guest Actor in a Comedy Series	The Studio (episode: "CinemaCon")	Won	

=== Golden Globe Awards ===
Year	Category	Nominated work	Result	Ref.
2003	Best Supporting Actor – Series, Miniseries or TV Film	Malcolm in the Middle	Nominated	
2011	Best Actor in a Television Series – Drama	Breaking Bad	Nominated	
2012	Best Actor in a Television Series – Drama	Breaking Bad	Nominated	
2013	Best Actor in a Television Series – Drama	Breaking Bad	Nominated	
2014	Best Actor in a Television Series – Drama	Breaking Bad	Won	
2016	Best Actor in a Motion Picture – Drama	Trumbo	Nominated	
2017	Best Actor – Miniseries or Television Film	All the Way	Nominated	
2021	Best Actor – Miniseries or Television Film	Your Honor	Nominated	

=== Laurence Olivier Awards ===
Year	Category	Nominated work	Result	Ref.
2018	Best Actor in a Play	Network	Won	
2026	Best Actor in a Play	All My Sons	Nominated	

=== Tony Awards ===
Year	Category	Nominated work	Result	Ref.
2014	Best Actor in a Play	All the Way	Won	
2019	Best Actor in a Play	Network	Won	

== Other associations ==
Organizations	Year	Category	Work	Result	Ref.
Annie Awards	2018	Best Voice Acting in a Feature Production	Isle of Dogs	Won	
Directors Guild of America	2013	Outstanding Directorial Achievement – Television Comedy Series	Modern Family (Note: For the episodes "Election Day" & "The Old Man and the Tree")	Nominated	
Directors Guild of America	2014	Outstanding Directorial Achievement – Television Comedy Series	Modern Family	Nominated	
Directors Guild of America	2014	Outstanding Directorial Achievement – Television Drama Series	Breaking Bad ("Blood Money")	Nominated	
Hollywood Critics Association	2021	Best Actor in a Limited Series, Anthology Series, or Television Movie	Your Honor	Nominated	
Hollywood Film Awards	2012	Hollywood Ensemble Award	Argo	Won	
Festival de Télévision de Monte-Carlo	2013	Outstanding Actor in a Drama Series	Breaking Bad	Won	
People's Choice Awards	2014	Favorite Television Anti-Hero	Breaking Bad	Nominated	
Phoenix Film Critics Society	2011	Best Cast	Contagion	Nominated	
Phoenix Film Critics Society	2012	Best Cast	Argo	Nominated	
Prism Awards	2009	Best Performance in a Drama Series	Breaking Bad	Nominated	
Prism Awards	2010	Best Performance in a Drama Series	Breaking Bad	Nominated	
Prism Awards	2011	Best Performance in a Drama Series	Breaking Bad	Nominated	
Prism Awards	2013	Best Performance in a Drama Series	Breaking Bad	Nominated	
Satellite Awards	2004	Best Actor in a Television Series – Comedy or Musical	Malcolm in the Middle	Nominated	
Satellite Awards	2008	Best Actor in a Television Series – Drama	Breaking Bad	Won	
Satellite Awards	2009	Best Actor in a Television Series – Drama	Breaking Bad	Won	
Satellite Awards	2010	Best Actor in a Television Series – Drama	Breaking Bad	Won	
Satellite Awards	2011	Best Actor in a Television Series – Drama	Breaking Bad	Nominated	
Satellite Awards	2012	Best Actor in a Television Series – Drama	Breaking Bad	Nominated	
Satellite Awards	2014	Best Actor in a Television Series – Drama	Breaking Bad	Won	
Satellite Awards	2016	Best Actor in a Miniseries or Motion Picture – Television	All the Way	Won	
Satellite Awards	2020	Best Actor in a Miniseries or Motion Picture – Television	Your Honor	Nominated	
Saturn Award	2009	Best Performance by a Lead Actor on Television	Breaking Bad	Nominated	
Saturn Award	2010	Best Performance by a Lead Actor on Television	Breaking Bad	Nominated	
Saturn Award	2011	Best Performance by a Lead Actor on Television	Breaking Bad	Nominated	
Saturn Award	2012	Best Performance by a Lead Actor on Television	Breaking Bad	Won	
Saturn Award	2013	Best Performance by a Lead Actor on Television	Breaking Bad	Won	
Saturn Award	2014	Best Performance by a Lead Actor on Television	Breaking Bad	Nominated	
Saturn Award	2018	Best Guest Starring Role on Television	Electric Dreams	Nominated	
San Diego Film Critics Society	2012	Best Cast	Argo	Nominated	
San Diego Film Critics Society	2015	Best Actor	Trumbo	Nominated	
Television Critics Association Awards	2001	Individual Achievement in Comedy	Malcolm in the Middle	Nominated	
Television Critics Association Awards	2009	Individual Achievement in Drama	Breaking Bad	Won	
Television Critics Association Awards	2010	Individual Achievement in Drama	Breaking Bad	Nominated	
Television Critics Association Awards	2012	Individual Achievement in Drama	Breaking Bad	Nominated	
Television Critics Association Awards	2013	Individual Achievement in Drama	Breaking Bad	Nominated	
Television Critics Association Awards	2014	Individual Achievement in Drama	Breaking Bad	Nominated	
Television Critics Association Awards	2016	Individual Achievement in Drama	All the Way	Nominated	

== Other theater awards ==
Organizations	Year	Category	Work	Result	Ref.
Critics’ Circle Theatre Awards	2017	Best Actor	Network	Won	
Drama Desk Awards	2014	Outstanding Actor in a Play	All the Way	Won	
Drama League Awards	2019	Distinguished Performer	Network	Won	
Outer Critics Circle Awards	2014	Outstanding Actor in a Play	All the Way	Won	
Outer Critics Circle Awards	2019	Outstanding Actor in a Play	Network	Won	
Theater World Awards	2014	Distinguished Performer	All the Way	Won	
