= Bryan Cranston =

American actor (born 1956)

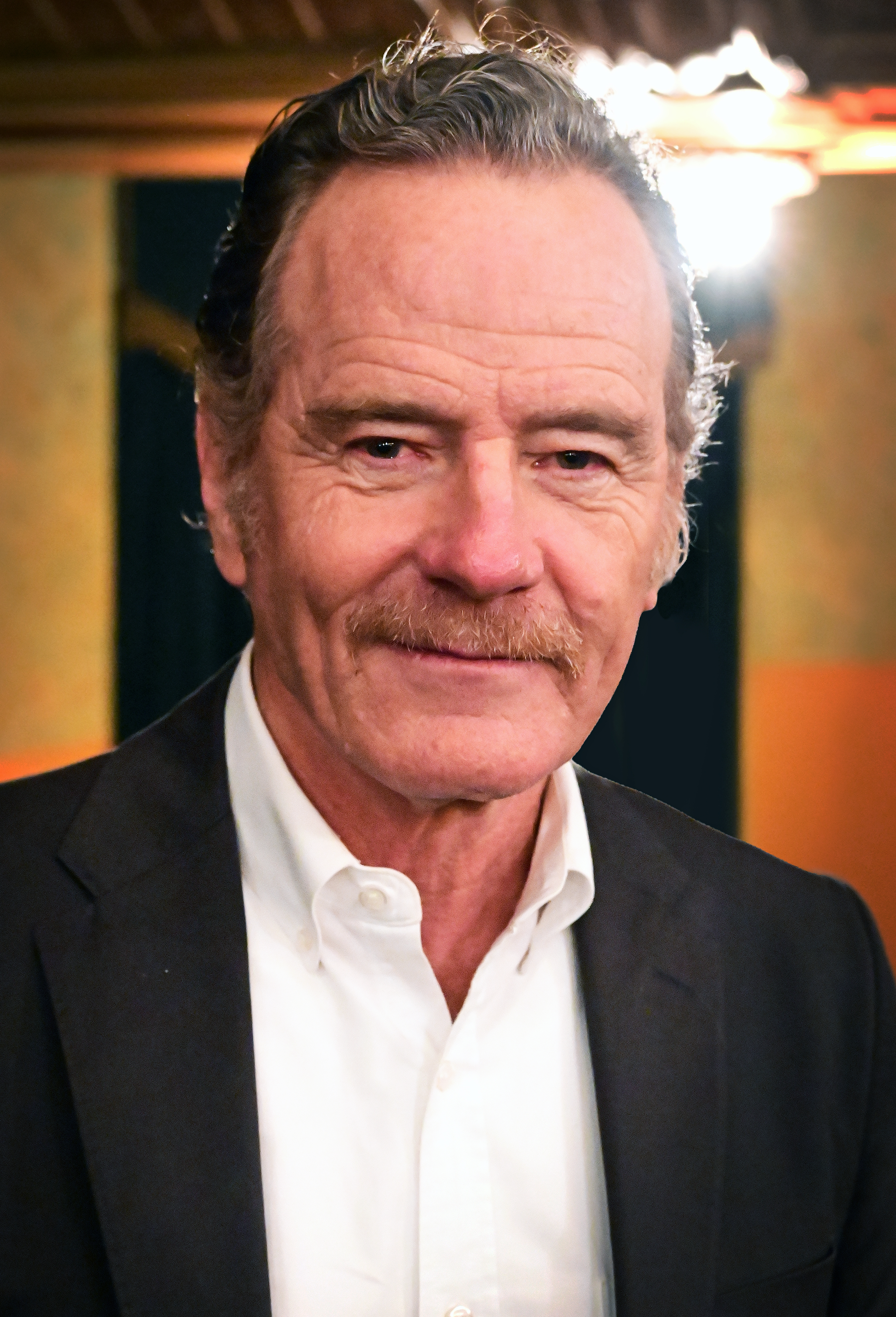
- Cranston in 2026
- Born: Bryan Lee Cranston; March 7, 1956 (age 70); Los Angeles, California, U.S.
- Education: Los Angeles Valley College (AS)
- Occupation: Actor
- Years active: 1980–present
- Works: Full list
- Spouses: Mickey Middleton (m. 1977; div. 1982); Robin Dearden (m. 1989)
- Children: Taylor Dearden
- Father: Joseph Cranston
- Awards: Full list

Bryan Lee Cranston (born March 7, 1956) is an American actor. He established himself as a leading actor in both comic and dramatic works on stage and screen. His accolades include seven Primetime Emmy Awards, two Tony Awards, a Laurence Olivier Award, and a Golden Globe Award, as well as nominations for an Academy Award and a British Academy Film Award.

Cranston first gained prominence playing Hal in the Fox sitcom Malcolm in the Middle (2000–2006) for which he was nominated for the Primetime Emmy Award for Outstanding Supporting Actor in a Comedy Series. He gained stardom for his dramatic leading role playing Walter White in the AMC crime drama series Breaking Bad (2008–2013) for which he won the Outstanding Lead Actor in a Drama Series four times (2008, 2009, 2010, and 2014). He was Emmy-nominated for All the Way (2016) and Curb Your Enthusiasm (2018). Cranston co-developed and appeared in the crime drama series Sneaky Pete (2015–2019) and starred in the drama series Your Honor (2020–2023).

On stage, he earned a Tony Award for Best Actor in a Play for his portrayal of President Lyndon B. Johnson in the Broadway play All the Way (2014), a role he reprised in the 2016 HBO film of the same name. He received the Laurence Olivier Award for Best Actor and his second Tony Award for portraying Howard Beale in the play Network on the West End and Broadway, respectively.

In film, Cranston earned nominations for the Academy Award and the BAFTA Award for Best Actor for portraying Dalton Trumbo in the Hollywood blacklist drama Trumbo (2015). Other notable films include Saving Private Ryan (1998), Little Miss Sunshine (2006), Drive (2011), Contagion (2011), Argo (2012), Godzilla (2014), The Infiltrator (2016), The Upside (2017), Last Flag Flying (2017), Isle of Dogs (2018), Asteroid City (2023), and The Phoenician Scheme (2025). He has voiced roles in Madagascar 3 (2012), Kung Fu Panda 3 (2016), and Kung Fu Panda 4 (2024).

== Early life and education ==
Bryan Lee Cranston was born in Hollywood, Los Angeles, on March 7, 1956, the second of three children born to Annalisa "Peggy" (née Sell), a radio actress, and Joseph Cranston, an actor and former semi-professional boxer. His father was of half Irish, quarter Austrian Jewish, and quarter German descent, while his mother was the daughter of German immigrants. Bryan's paternal great-grandfather, James Daniel Cranston, was from Montreal. Bryan has an older brother, Kyle, and a younger sister, Amy. Cranston was raised in Canoga Park, Los Angeles. His father held many jobs before deciding to become an actor but did not secure enough roles to provide for his family. He eventually walked out on the family when Cranston was 11 years old, and they did not see each other again until a 21-year-old Cranston and his brother Kyle decided to track him down. Cranston later starred in a film directed by his father titled The Big Turnaround in 1988. He then maintained a relationship with his father until the latter's death in 2014.

Cranston has claimed that he based his portrayal of Walter White on his own father, who had a slumped posture "like the weight of the world was on his shoulders". After his father left, he was raised partly by his maternal grandparents and lived on their poultry farm in Yucaipa, California. He has called his parents "broken people" who were "incapacitated as far as parenting" and caused the family to lose their house in a foreclosure. In 1968, when he was 12 years old, he encountered Charles Manson while riding horses with his cousin at Spahn Ranch, which Cranston noted took place a year before Manson ordered the Tate–LaBianca murders. Cranston graduated from Canoga Park High School, where he was a member of the school's chemistry club, and earned an associate degree in police science from Los Angeles Valley College in 1976. While at Los Angeles Valley College he took an acting class for an elective, which inspired him to pursue a career in acting, saying "And at 19 years old, all of a sudden, my life changed."

== Career ==
=== 1980–1993: Career beginnings ===
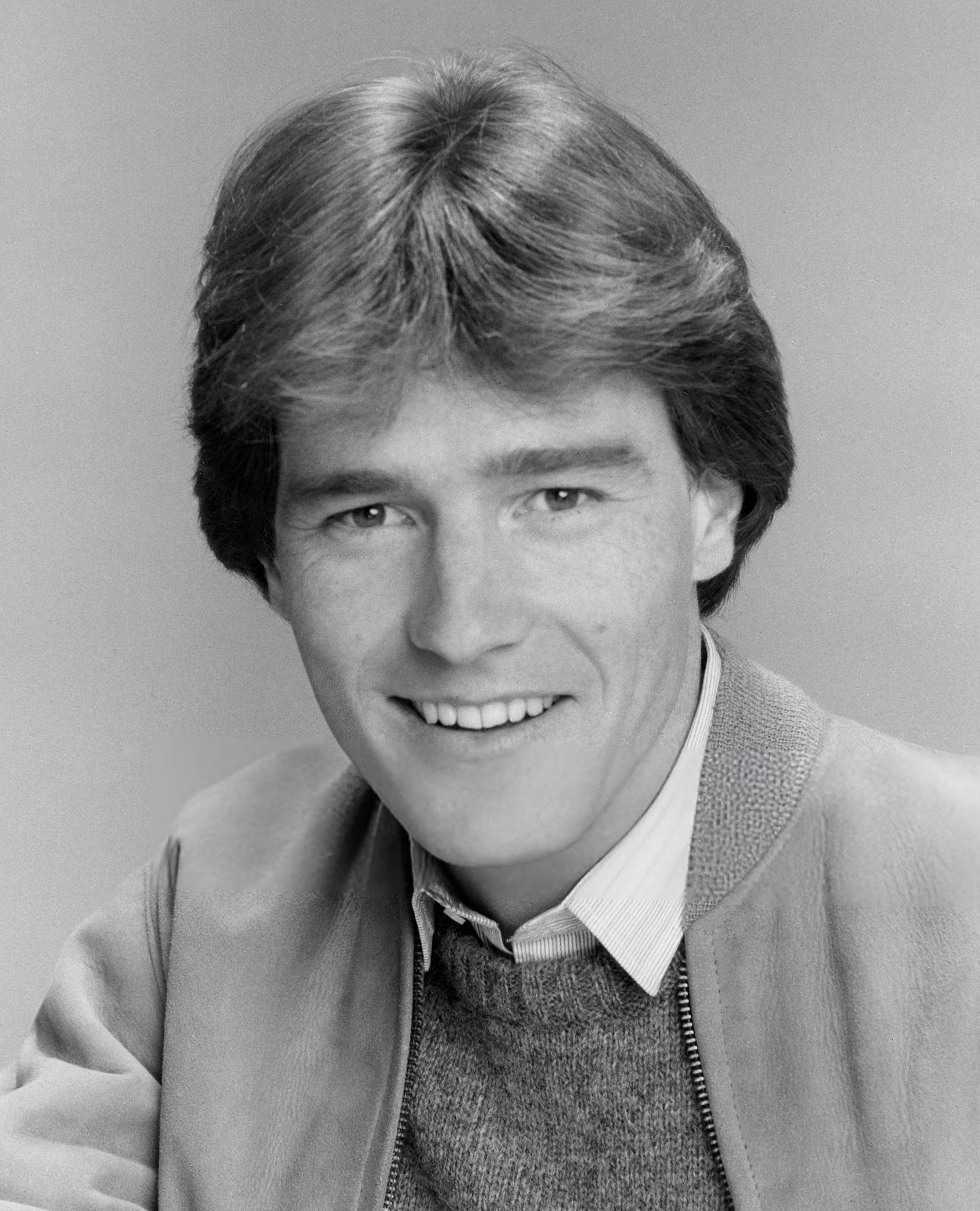
Cranston as Doug Donovan in Loving, 1983

After college, Cranston began his acting career in local and regional theaters, getting his start at the Granada Theater in the San Fernando Valley. He had performed as a youth, but his show-business parents had mixed feelings about their son being involved in the profession, so he did not act until years later. Cranston was ordained as a minister when he was 19 by the Universal Life Church, and performed weddings for $150 a service to help with his income. Cranston noted "I think I was 19-years-old when I first started doing that on Catalina Island, where I was spending my summers working. Unbeknownst to me, I didn't realize how easy it was to do that. You simply fill in the application, send it to the Secretary of State of whatever state you're in, and you are ordained ... Bless you." He also worked as a waiter, night-shift security guard at the gates of a private LA community, truck loader, camera operator for a video dating service, and a CCTV security guard at a supermarket.

Cranston started working regularly in the late 1980s, mostly doing minor roles and advertisements. He was an original cast member of the ABC soap opera Loving, where he played Douglas Donovan from 1983 to 1985. Cranston starred in the short-lived series Raising Miranda in 1988. Cranston played Tom Logan in an episode of the first season of the TV series Baywatch in 1989. Cranston's voice acting includes English dubbing of Japanese anime (for which he primarily used the non-union pseudonym Lee Stone), including Macross Plus and Armitage III: Poly-Matrix, and most notably, Street Fighter II: The Animated Movie as Fei-Long, and the children's series Mighty Morphin Power Rangers. Cranston did voice work for the 1993–94 first season of that series, playing characters such as Twin Man and Snizzard, for which he was paid about $50 an hour for two or three hours of daily work. The Blue Power Ranger, Billy Cranston, was thought to be named for him but this has since proven false.

=== 1994–2006: Breakthrough and Malcolm in the Middle ===
In 1994, Cranston got the recurring role of Dr. Tim Whatley, Jerry's dentist, on Seinfeld. He played the role until 1997. In 1996, he played the first of his two biographical roles as an astronaut when he portrayed Gus Grissom in the film That Thing You Do!. In 1997, he played a supporting role in the Michael Dudikoff action film Strategic Command, alongside Richard Norton, Paul Winfield, and Stephen Quadros. Later that year he had a small role in Babylon 5 as Ericsson, a starship captain who sacrifices himself as part of a plan to save the galaxy.

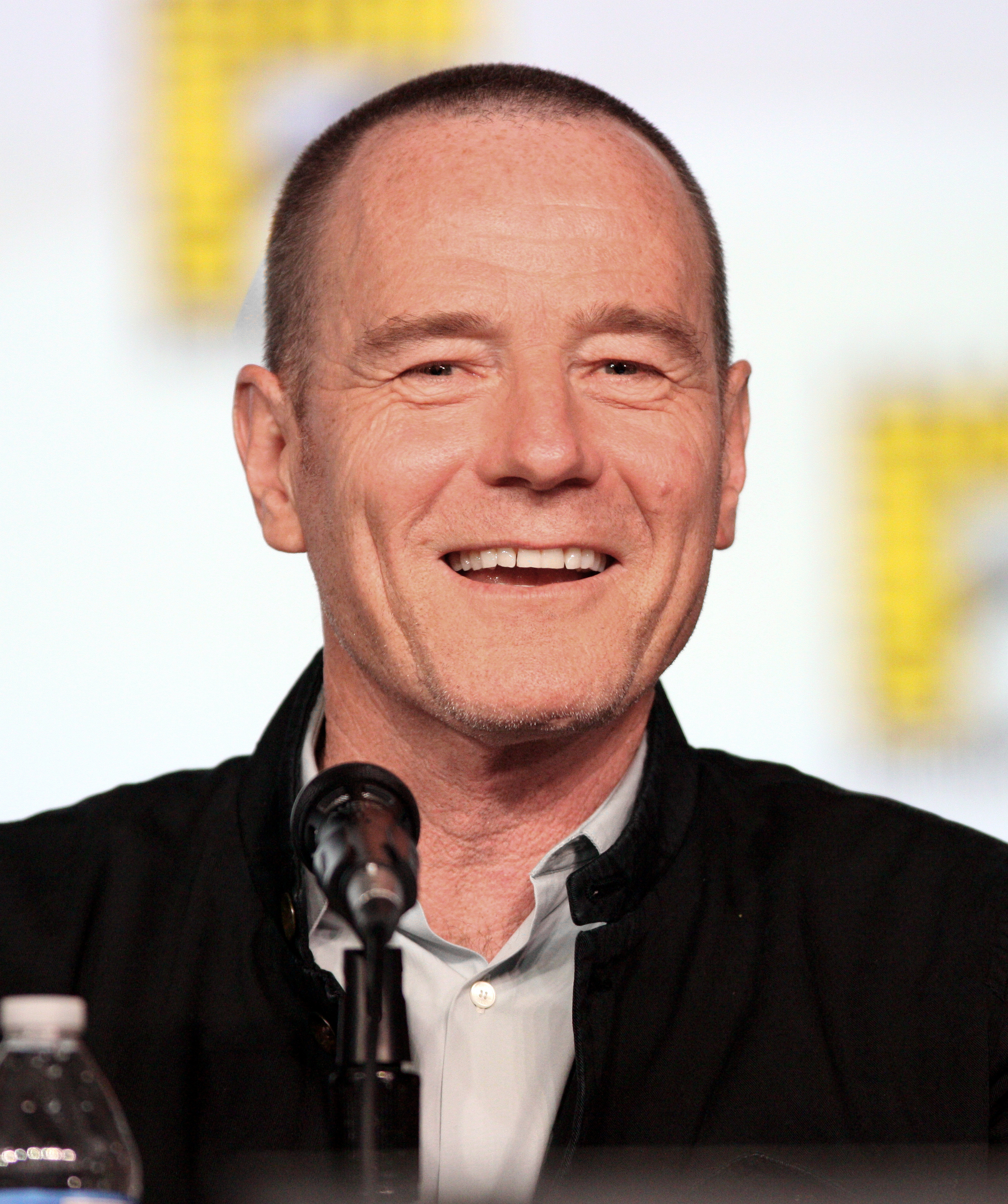
Cranston at the 2012 San Diego Comic-Con

In 1998, Cranston appeared in the episode "Drive" of The X-Files written by Vince Gilligan. That same year, he played his second astronaut role when he portrayed Buzz Aldrin in the HBO miniseries From the Earth to the Moon. In 1999, Cranston wrote and directed the film Last Chance. That same year he made his second appearance for a recurring role on the CBS sitcom The King of Queens, playing Doug Heffernan's neighbor, Tim Sacksky. In 1998, he appeared in Steven Spielberg's Saving Private Ryan, as one-armed War Department Colonel I.W. Bryce, who reported to General George Marshall that Private Ryan was the last survivor of his brothers, and his assumed location. His theatrical credits include starring roles in The God of Hell, Chapter Two, The Taming of the Shrew, A Doll's House, Barefoot in the Park, Eastern Standard, Wrestlers and The Steven Weed Show, for which he won a Drama-Logue Award.

In 2000, Cranston landed a leading role as Hal on the comedy series Malcolm in the Middle. He remained with the show until its end in 2006. Cranston ultimately directed several episodes of the show and received three Primetime Emmy Award nominations for his performance. Cranston reprised his role in a cutaway gag during the Family Guy episode "I Take Thee Quagmire", killing Lois (his wife on Malcolm in the Middle) with a refrigerator door, and in an alternate ending of Breaking Bad with Jane Kaczmarek reprising her role as Lois.

He has had guest roles in many television series, including a white-collar criminal searching for his estranged wife and daughter on The Flash, and a lawyer attempting to free the title character from a contract in Sabrina the Teenage Witch. He also had a guest role in late 2006 on the CBS sitcom How I Met Your Mother, playing Ted Mosby's obnoxious co-worker and former boss Hammond Druthers. He played Lucifer in the ABC Family miniseries Fallen and appeared as Nick Wrigley, an irresponsible uncle who accidentally brings Christmas close to destruction when he steals Santa's sleigh to have a crazy ride, in the 2001 Disney Channel Original Movie 'Twas the Night. In that same year, he provided the voice of Gary's father in Gary & Mike. He appeared as the more successful business colleague of Greg Kinnear's character in the film Little Miss Sunshine (2006). In September 2008, Cranston narrated a pre-teen adventure/fantasy audiobook called Adventures with Kazmir the Flying Camel.

=== 2008–2013: Stardom with Breaking Bad ===
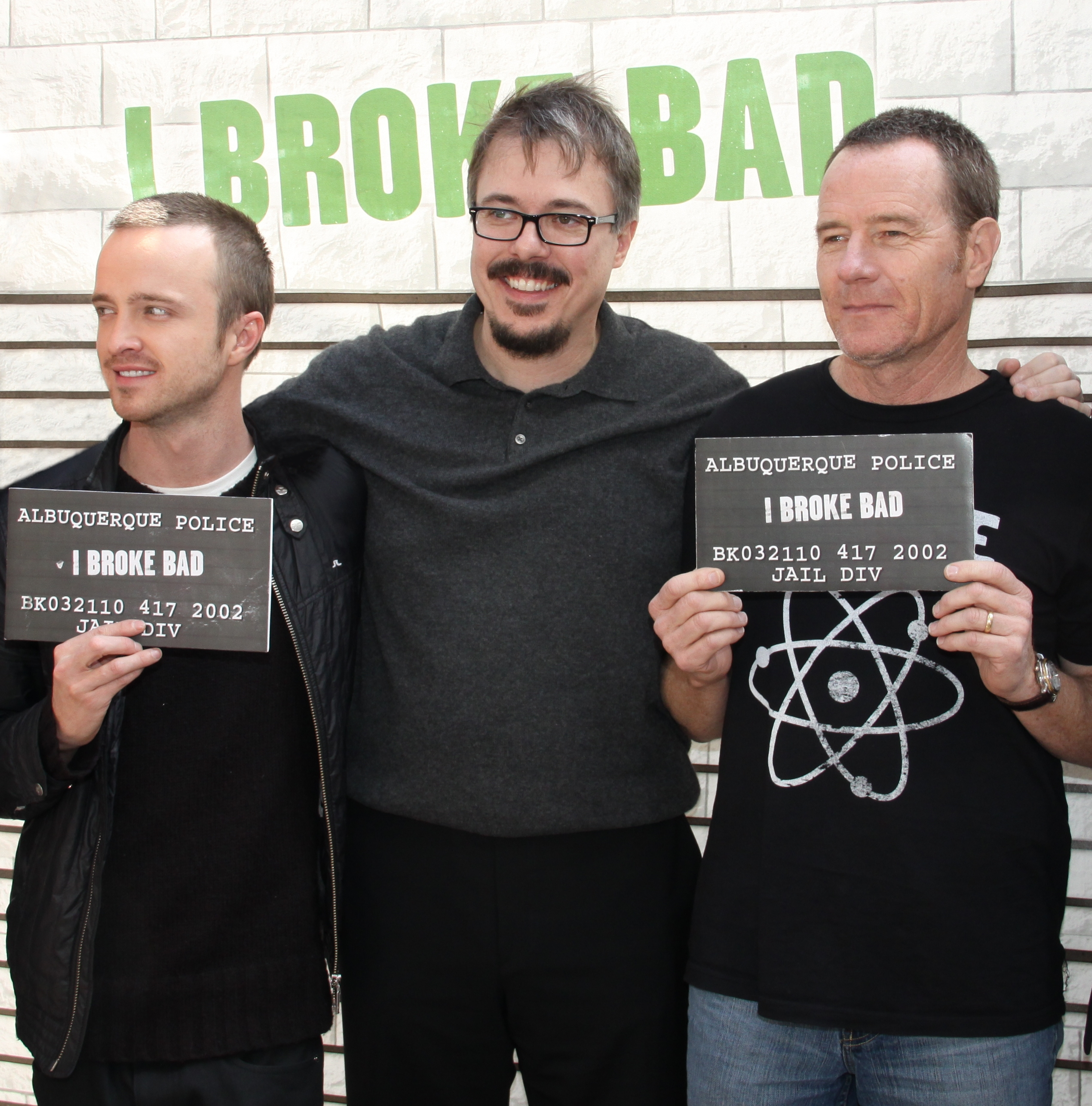
Cranston (right) with Aaron Paul and Vince Gilligan in 2010

From 2008 to 2013, Cranston starred in the AMC series Breaking Bad, created by Vince Gilligan, in which he played the show's protagonist, Walter White, a high-school chemistry teacher who is diagnosed with terminal lung cancer. Determined to ensure the financial well-being of his family after he dies, Walter teams up with former student Jesse Pinkman (played by Aaron Paul), to manufacture and sell methamphetamine, in the process becoming increasingly ruthless and violent. Cranston's work on the series was met with widespread critical acclaim, winning him the Primetime Emmy Award for Outstanding Lead Actor in a Drama Series in each of the show's first three seasons and being nominated in 2012 and 2013 for seasons four and five (winning again in 2014 for the second half of season 5). Cranston and Bill Cosby are the only actors to have won the award three consecutive times. Cranston was also a producer for the fourth and fifth seasons of the series, and directed three episodes of the show during its run.

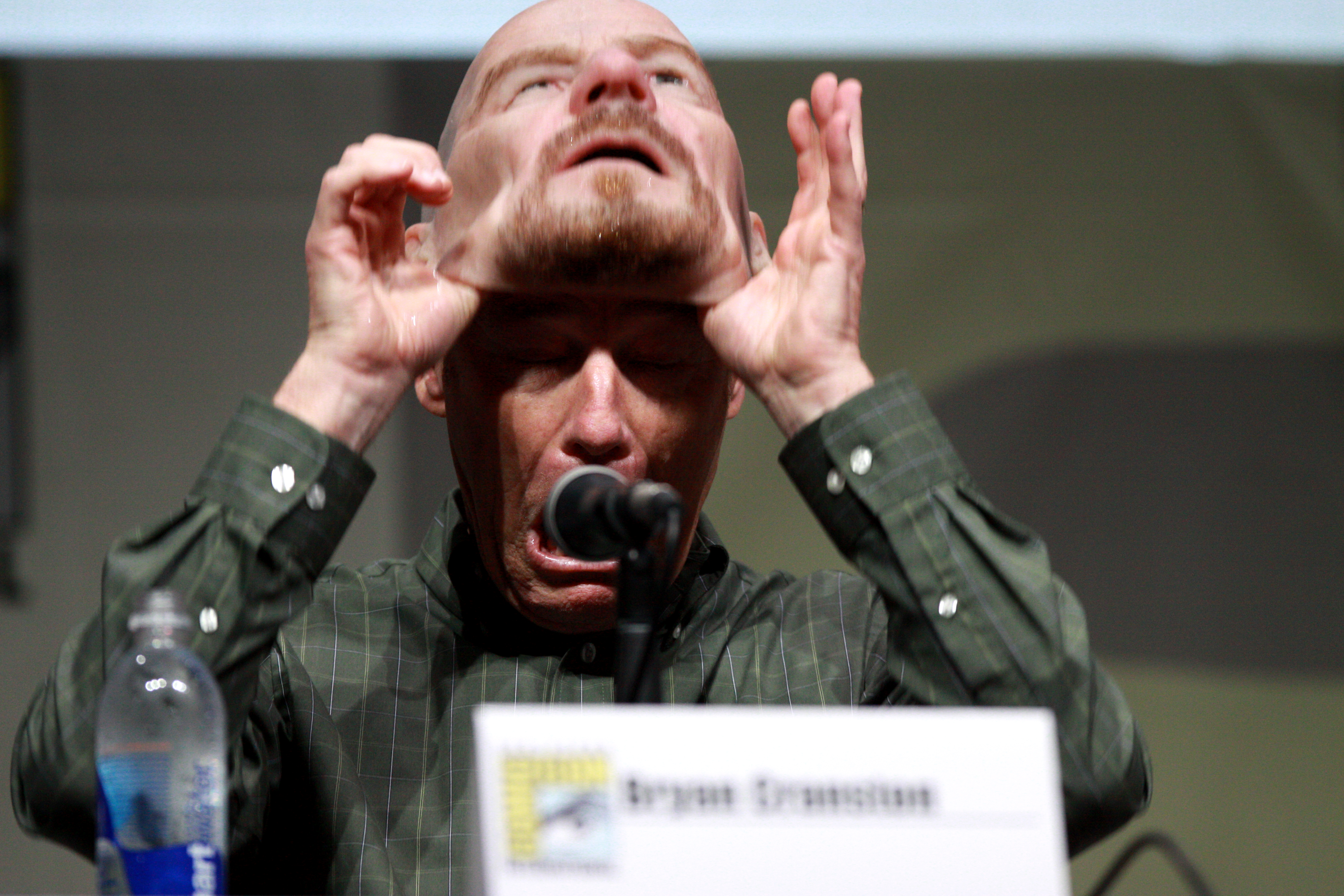
Cranston removing a rubber mask of Walter White at San Diego Comic-Con in 2013

In 2011, Cranston had supporting roles in three successful films, the drama The Lincoln Lawyer, as well as the thrillers Drive and Contagion. He voiced James "Jim" Gordon in the animated film Batman: Year One (2011). In 2012, he had supporting roles in John Carter, Madagascar 3: Europe's Most Wanted as Vitaly the tiger, and Rock of Ages, and a major role in the hostage drama Argo. He also lent his voice to several episodes of the animated series Robot Chicken. In 2012, he starred in the remake of the 1990 film Total Recall, as Chancellor Vilos Cohaagen, the corrupted president of a fictional war-ravaged United Federation of Britain. In the same year, he made a guest appearance as Kenneth Parcell's step-father, Ron, on the NBC sitcom 30 Rock, and was invited to join the Academy of Motion Picture Arts and Sciences.

=== 2013–present: Broadway roles and acclaim ===
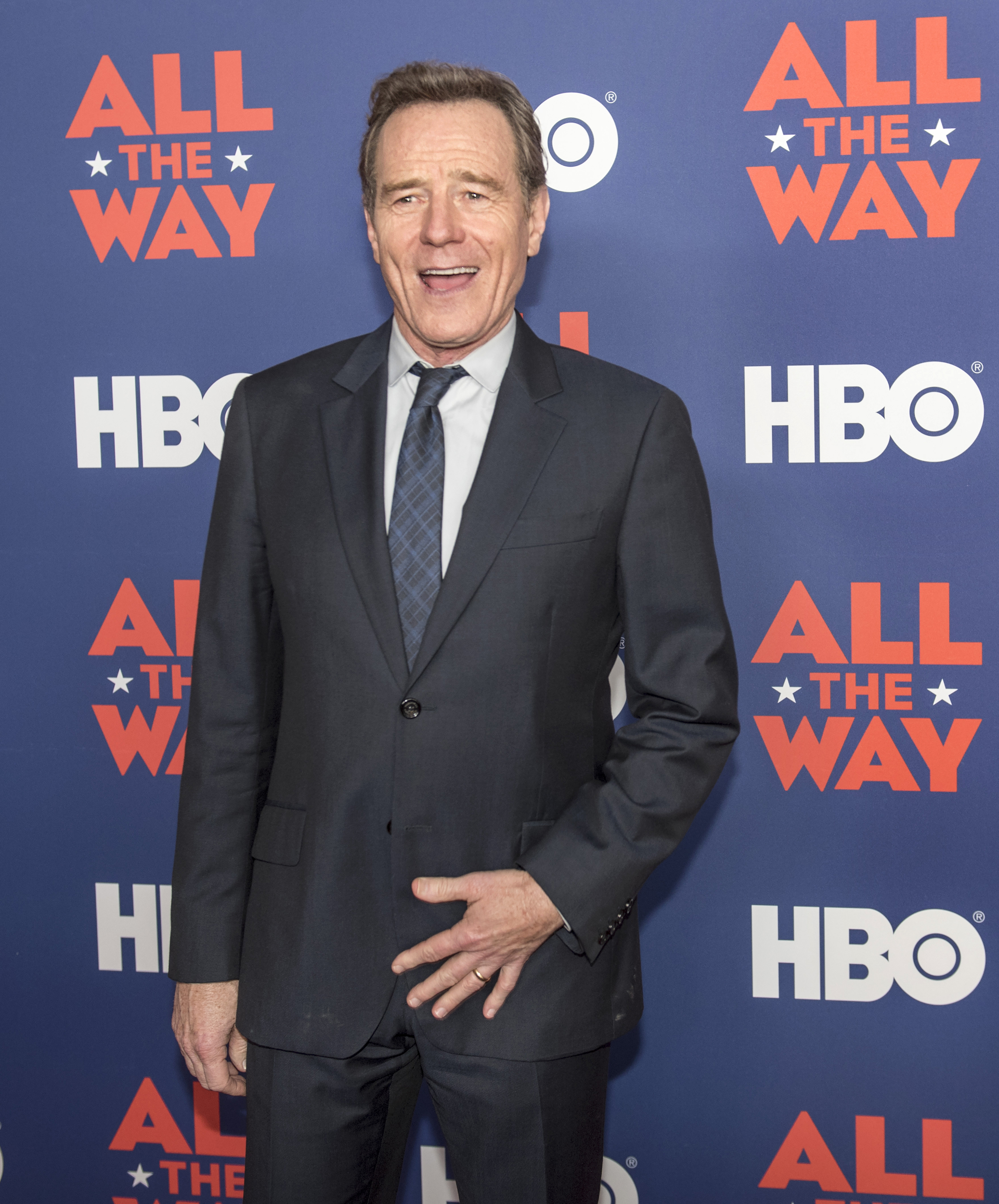
Cranston at the All the Way premiere at the LBJ Library, Austin in 2016

From September 2013 to June 2014, Cranston played U.S. president Lyndon B. Johnson in the American Repertory Theater and Broadway productions of All the Way. The play depicted President Johnson's efforts to maneuver members of the 88th United States Congress to enact, and civil rights leaders including Martin Luther King Jr. to support, the Civil Rights Act of 1964. The performance has received widespread acclaim with Charles Isherwood of The New York Times writing, "Mr. Cranston strides onto the Broadway stage with an admirable confidence, meeting the challenge of animating Mr. Schenkkan's sprawling civics lesson as if he's thoroughly at home...Mr. Cranston's heat-generating performance galvanizes the production". He went on to win the Tony Award for Best Actor in a Play for the role. He also played scientist Joe Brody in the 2014 reboot of Godzilla. From 2015 to 2019, he played Vince Lonigan in the Amazon Prime Video series Sneaky Pete. Cranston also served as a co-creator, writer and executive producer on the project.

Cranston was on the producing team for the 2015 Broadway production of Finding Neverland and served as executive producer for the subsequent US national tour.

Cranston has produced an instructional DVD called KidSmartz, which is designed to teach families how to stay safe from child abductors and Internet predators. KidSmartz raises money for the National Center for Missing & Exploited Children by donating half the proceeds from sales. Also, following the success of Breaking Bad, the year 2014 saw reports of Cranston developing new TV projects in collaboration with Sony Pictures Television. In 2016, it was announced that he would star in an episode of the Channel 4/Amazon Video series Philip K. Dick's Electric Dreams, and would also serve as an executive producer on the series.

Cranston reprised his role as Johnson in an HBO adaptation of All the Way (2016), executive produced by Steven Spielberg. Cranston's performance was widely praised earning the Actor Award for Outstanding Performance by a Male Actor in a Miniseries or Television Movie as well as nominations for the Primetime Emmy Award, Golden Globe Award, and Critics' Choice Television Award. In 2015, Cranston starred as screenwriter Dalton Trumbo in the biopic Trumbo, for which he received Best Actor nominations for the Academy Award, Actor Award, BAFTA Award, Golden Globe Award and Critics' Choice Movie Award. In 2016, Cranston voiced Li, the biological father of Po, in Kung Fu Panda 3. Also that year, he appeared in the films The Infiltrator and Wakefield. Cranston's memoir, A Life in Parts, was published on October 11, 2016, became a New York Times bestseller, and received positive reviews. In 2017, he voiced Zordon in Lionsgate's Power Rangers, which marked his return to the franchise after providing voices for the first season.

Cranston portrayed the news anchor Howard Beale in the play Network, an adaptation of the 1976 film of the same name, in November 2017. The play, with Cranston as star, transferred to Broadway, opening at the Belasco Theatre on December 6, 2018. David Rooney of The Hollywood Reporter wrote that "the volcanic Bryan Cranston giving a gut-wrenching performance" as Beale and that "Cranston's magnetic presence has more than enough electricity to surge through the play's weak spots". Cranston received numerous accolades for his performance including his second Tony Award for Best Actor in a Play as well as the Laurence Olivier Award for Best Actor and the Drama League Award for Distinguished Performance.

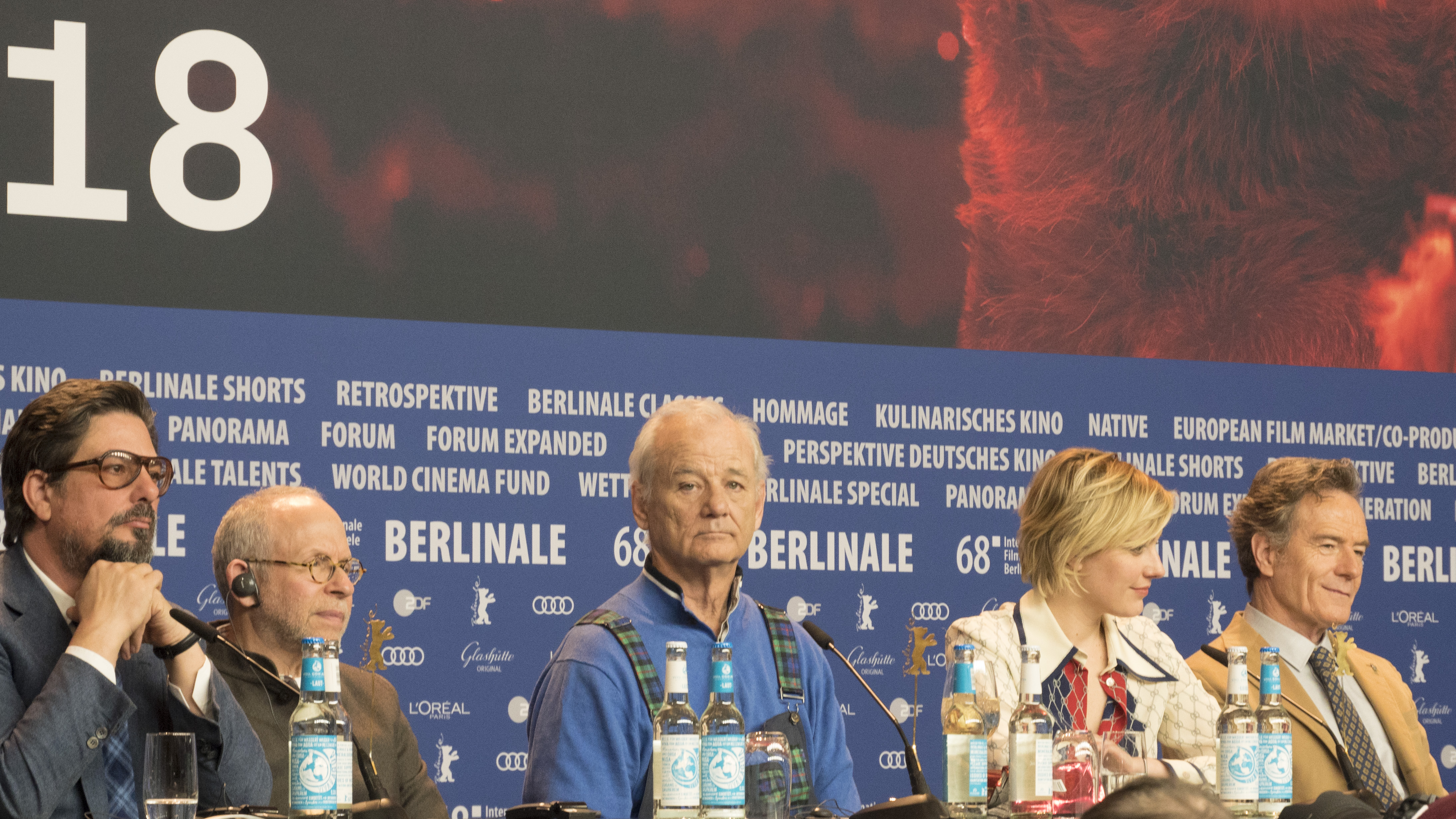
Roman Coppola, Bob Balaban, Bill Murray, Greta Gerwig, and Cranston at the Isle of Dogs press conference at Berlinale 2018

He acted in the role of Phillip Lacasse, a wealthy paraplegic in the movie The Upside (2017) along with Kevin Hart and Nicole Kidman. He was part of the ensemble cast of the 2018 animated film Isle of Dogs, by Wes Anderson, which premiered at the 68th Berlin International Film Festival, where he played the lead dog Chief. Cranston appeared in the ninth season of the HBO comedy series Curb Your Enthusiasm, playing Larry David's therapist. In October 2018, Cranston became the voice for a new series of Ford commercials featuring the tagline 'Built Ford Proud'. In 2019, his production company Moonshot Entertainment signed a deal with Warner Bros. Television.

In 2020, he starred as the lead human, Mack, in the Disney film The One and Only Ivan. From 2020 to 2023, he had the lead role in the miniseries Your Honor, playing a judge and the father of a boy who accidentally kills someone. In 2022, Cranston reprised the role of Walter White during the final season of the Breaking Bad prequel series Better Call Saul. In 2023, Cranston had another appearance as Walter White, alongside Aaron Paul's Jesse, and Raymond Cruz as Tuco Salamanca in a Super Bowl LVII commercial for PopCorners. He has stated this could be his final appearance as the character. In 2025, Cranston returned to the stage in an acclaimed Ivo van Hove-directed production of Arthur Miller's All My Sons on the West End, acting opposite Marianne Jean-Baptiste and Paapa Essiedu; Cranston was nominated for his second Laurence Olivier Award for Best Actor in 2026.

In 2024, Cranston appeared in the film Everything's Going to Be Great. It was also announced that he would star alongside Lily Gladstone in the action-thriller Lone Wolf, playing a contractor who recruits a troubled veteran for a covert mission. In 2025, Cranston had a recurring role as studio head Griffin Mill in the series The Studio.

In 2026, he had a supporting role as war veteran Dave in the dark comedy crime film Chili Finger. He additionally voiced the character Rob in the animated film Tangles.

== Personal life ==
=== Marriage and family ===
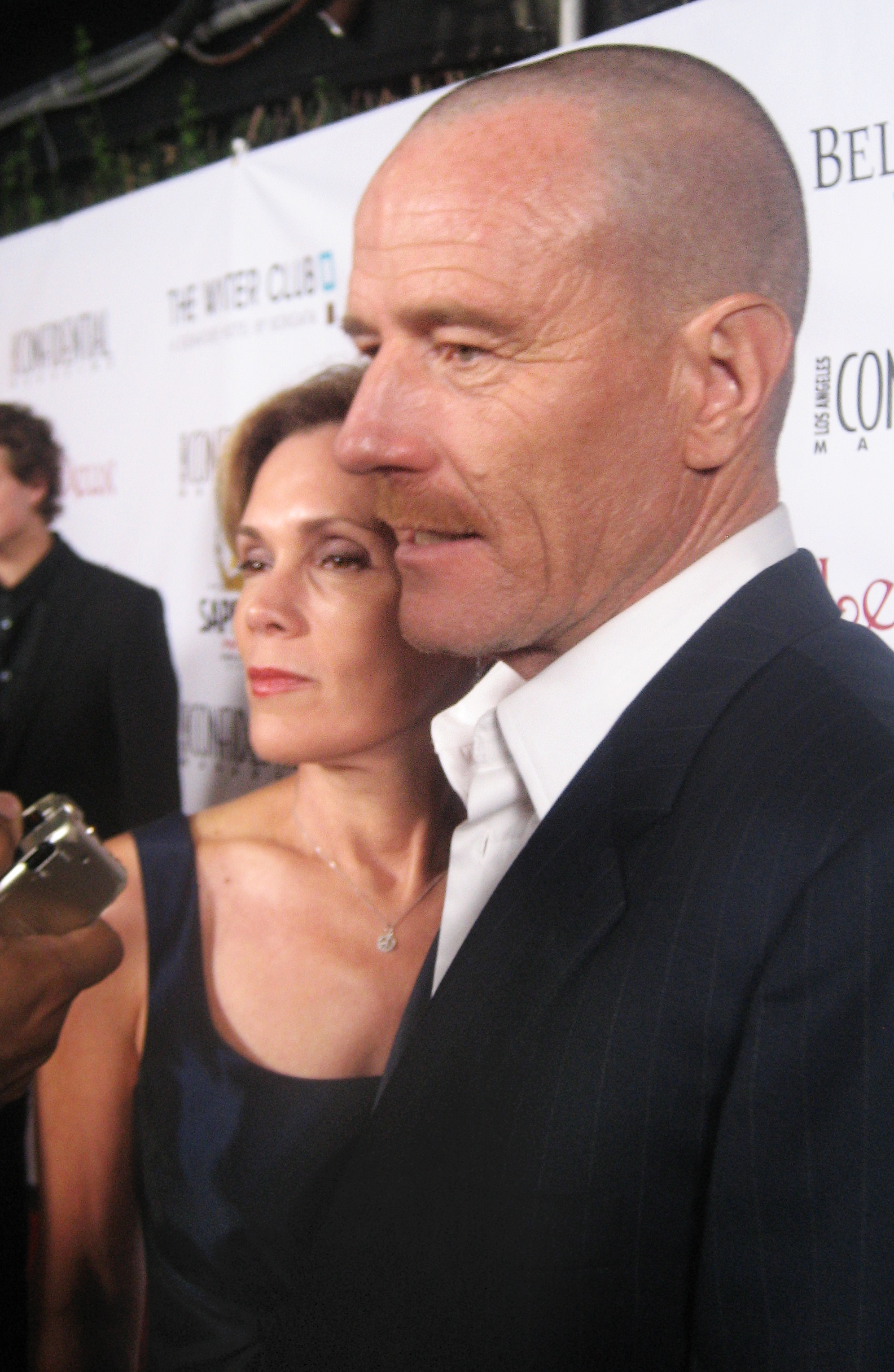
Cranston and wife Robin Dearden in September 2008

From 1977 to 1982, Cranston was married to writer Mickey Middleton. On July 8, 1989, he married Robin Dearden whom he met on the set of the series Airwolf in 1985; he was playing the villain of the week and she played a hostage he held at gunpoint. Both Dearden and her daughter with Cranston, actress Taylor Dearden (b. February 12, 1993), appeared in the Breaking Bad episode "No Más", directed by Cranston.

=== Interests ===
Cranston played baseball when he was a student, and remains a collector of baseball memorabilia. His collection includes pennants, signed cards and jerseys. A notable item in his collection is an Atlanta Braves jersey signed by numerous players in the 500 home run club. He is an avid fan of both the Los Angeles Dodgers and the Los Angeles Rams. During the 2022 MLB Celebrity Softball Game, Cranston was the first celebrity to be ejected after being struck by a pitch and jokingly throwing a bucket of bubble gum at an umpire.

When he accepted his third Primetime Emmy Award for Outstanding Lead Actor in a Drama Series in 2010, Cranston thanked his wife and daughter and told them he loves them "more than baseball". The family lived in a Ventura County, California beach house which Cranston designed.

While filming Breaking Bad, Cranston lived in Albuquerque, New Mexico. He was a co-owner of the former independent theater Cinemas Palme d'Or in Palm Desert, California.

Cranston and castmate Aaron Paul both got Breaking Bad tattoos on the last day of filming to commemorate the final episode of Breaking Bad. Cranston's tattoo consists of the show's logo on his right ring finger, while Paul's tattoo consists of "no half measures" on his biceps.

Cranston and Paul announced the release of their signature mezcal, Dos Hombres, in July 2019.

=== Influences ===
Cranston has stated, "Dick Van Dyke influenced me a lot... you know, his physical comedy and his ability to be loose in his body." In a 2016 interview with Larry King, he said that he would love to work with Meryl Streep, Emma Thompson, and Dustin Hoffman.

=== Political views ===
Cranston is a registered Democrat. He supports abortion rights, decriminalizing marijuana, same-sex marriage, and gun control.

Cranston supported Hillary Clinton in the 2016 United States presidential election and opposed the candidacy of Donald Trump. However, upon Trump becoming president, Cranston expressed disappointment with those who hoped Trump would fail: "President Trump is not the person who I wanted to be in that office, and I've been very open about that. That being said, he is the president. If he fails, the country is in jeopardy. It would be egotistical for anyone to say, 'I hope he fails.' To that person I would say, fuck you." He openly criticized Trump in a 2023 interview on CNN, where he stated "The 'Make America Great Again' – my comment is: Do you accept that that could possibly be construed as a racist remark? And most people, a lot of people go, 'How could that be racist? Make America Great Again?' I said, 'So just ask yourself from an African American experience, when was it ever great in America for the African American? When was it great? If you're making it great again, it's not including them." He supported the Democratic candidate Kamala Harris in the 2024 presidential election.

=== Charity work ===
In April 2014, Cranston presented at Broadway Cares/Equity Fights AIDS Easter Bonnet Competition with Idina Menzel, Fran Drescher, and Denzel Washington, after raising donations at his Broadway show All the Way.

== Acting credits and accolades ==
He has received two Critics' Choice Movie Awards, a Drama Desk Award, seven Emmy Awards, two Golden Globe Awards, a Laurence Olivier Award, five Actor Awards, and two Tony Awards as well as nominations for an Academy Award and a British Academy Film Award, and a Directors Guild of America Award.

He won the Primetime Emmy Award for Outstanding Lead Actor in a Drama Series four times (2008, 2009, 2010, and 2014) playing Walter White in the AMC crime drama series Breaking Bad (2008–2013). After becoming a producer of the show in 2011, he also won the award for Outstanding Drama Series twice. He was Emmy-nominated for playing Hal in the Fox sitcom Malcolm in the Middle (2000–2006), Lyndon B. Johnson in All the Way (2016), and Curb Your Enthusiasm (2018).

On stage, he won two Tony Awards for Best Actor in a Play for his performances as Lyndon B. Johnson in Robert Schenkkan's historical epic All the Way (2014) and Howard Beale in Lee Hall's dramatic play Network (2019). For the latter, he reprised the role in London winning the Laurence Olivier Award for Best Actor.

== Publications ==
- A Life in Parts (autobiography, published in 2016) ISBN 978-1-4767-9385-6
- Creating Social and Emotional Learning Environments (wrote foreword, educational non-fiction, published in 2020) ISBN 978-1-4938-8832-0

== See also ==
- List of actors with Academy Award nominations
- List of Golden Globe winners
- List of Primetime Emmy Award winners
