= A Life in Parts =

2016 memoir by Bryan Cranston

- First edition
- Author: Bryan Cranston
- Language: English
- Subject: Bryan Cranston's various film and television roles
- Genre: Autobiography
- Published: October 20, 2016
- Publisher: Scribner (US); Orion Books (UK)
- Pages: 288

A Life in Parts is a 2016 memoir by American actor Bryan Cranston that explores his various television and film appearances. Most of the book focuses on Cranston's most prominent role, Walter White from Breaking Bad.
