= PopCorners =

American snack brand

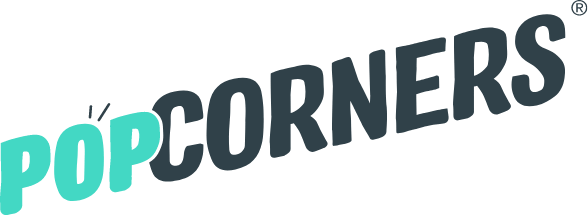

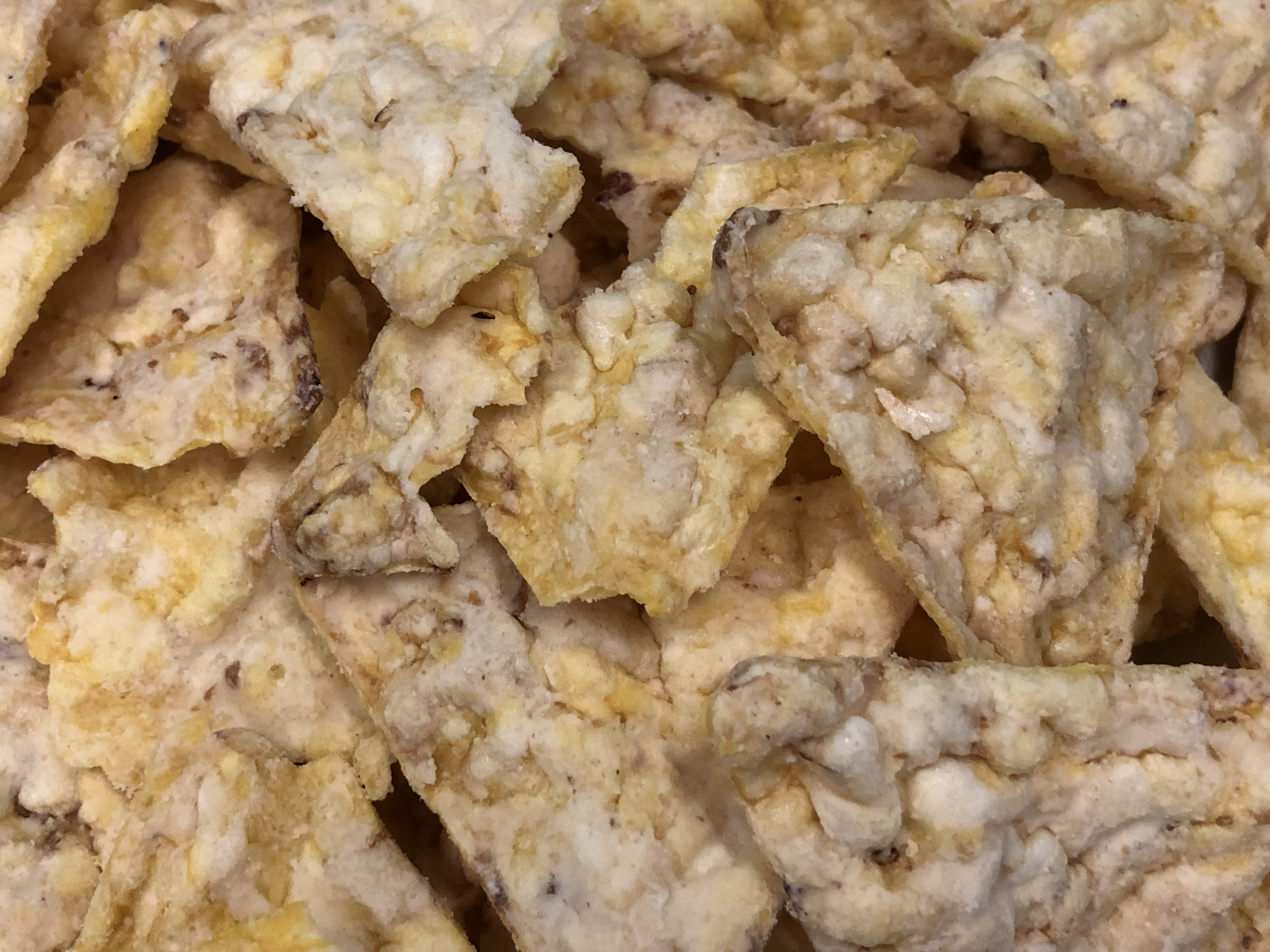
- Closeup of the white cheddar flavor of PopCorners
- Products: Popcorn-based snacks
- Parent: PepsiCo
- Website: popcorners.com

PopCorners is an American brand of snacks that is owned by PepsiCo. They are known for corn chips popped in a similar vein to popcorn.

== History ==
PopCorners was founded in Liberty, New York, which was launched as a snack line for Medora Snacks (Ideal Snacks) in 2010 or earlier. PopCorners (BFY Brands) was acquired by PepsiCo in December 2019.

== Products ==
PopCorners are currently available in the United States in nine varieties, sold individually or as part of a variety pack

- Kettle Corn
- White Cheddar
- Sea Salt
- Cinnamon Crunch
- Spicy Queso
- Sweet Chili (Discontinued)
- Jalapeno Popper
- Sour Cream & Onion
- Smokehouse BBQ

In a May 2025 ranking conducted by pop culture blog Sporked, Kettle Corn was named the favorite, earning a prestigious 10/10 Sporks.

== Advertising ==
They are noted for an advertisement during Super Bowl LVII, spoofing Breaking Bad.

Celebrities Tahir Moore and Don Cheadle have appeared in recent ads, Cheadle being a noted enthusiast of the product.
