= The God of Hell =

2004 play by Sam Shepard

- Original language: English
- Written by: Sam Shepard
- Genre: Drama

Premiere
- Date: 2004

The God of Hell is a play by American playwright Sam Shepard. The play was written in part as a response to the events of September 11, 2001. The plot centers on Wisconsin dairy farmer Frank and his wife Emma, whose peaceful, middle-American life is disrupted by Mr. Welch, a mysterious and ultra-patriotic government agent in pursuit of Frank's old friend, Haynes.

The God of Hell was premiered at The Actors Studio Drama School Theater in New York City. It was directed by Lou Jacob, and starred Tim Roth as Welch, Randy Quaid as Frank, J. Smith-Cameron as Emma, and Frank Wood as Haynes. Previews began on October 29, 2004, with the official opening on November 16, 2004. The production closed on November 28, 2004.

In October 2005, the play had its European premiere at the Donmar Warehouse in London, featuring Lesley Sharp as Emma, Ben Daniels as Welch, Stuart McQuarrie as Frank and Ewen Bremner as Haynes.

The play made its Australian premiere on April 7, 2007. Directed by Robyn Mclean, the cast included Russel Newman as Frank, Paul Bertram as Haynes, Ripely Hood as Mr. Welch and Annie Cossins as Emma. The production was stage-managed by Simon Fox.

== See also ==
- List of cultural references to the September 11 attacks
