= All the Way (2016 film) =

2016 television film directed by Jay Roach

- Release poster
- Based on: All the Way by Robert Schenkkan
- Written by: Robert Schenkkan
- Directed by: Jay Roach
- Starring: Bryan Cranston; Anthony Mackie; Melissa Leo; Frank Langella
- Music by: James Newton Howard
- Country of origin: United States
- Original language: English

Production
- Executive producers: Steven Spielberg; Robert Schenkkan; Bryan Cranston; Jay Roach; Darryl Frank; Justin Falvey
- Producers: Scott Ferguson; Jeffrey Richards
- Cinematography: Jim Denault
- Editor: Carol Littleton
- Running time: 132 minutes
- Production companies: HBO Films; Amblin Television; Moon Shot Entertainment; Tale Told Productions; Everyman Pictures

Original release
- Network: HBO
- Release: May 21, 2016

All the Way is a 2016 American biographical drama television film based on events during the first year of the presidency of Lyndon B. Johnson, from his inauguration following the assassination of John F. Kennedy to winning the 1964 United States presidential election. Directed by Jay Roach and adapted by Robert Schenkkan from his 2012 play All the Way, the film stars Bryan Cranston, who reprises his role as Johnson from the play's 2014 Broadway production, opposite Melissa Leo as First Lady Lady Bird Johnson; Anthony Mackie as Civil Rights Movement leader Martin Luther King Jr.; and Frank Langella as U.S. Senator Richard Russell Jr. from Georgia.

The film was broadcast on HBO on Saturday, May 21, 2016. The film has received positive reviews, with praise for Cranston's performance. It has been nominated for a Television Critics Association Award for Outstanding Achievement in Movies, Miniseries and Specials, with Cranston also nominated for Individual Achievement in Drama for his work on the film. It was nominated for eight Primetime Emmy Awards, including Outstanding Television Movie as well as acting nominations for Cranston and Leo.

== Plot ==
In 1963, Lyndon B. Johnson becomes President of the United States after the John F. Kennedy assassination, assisted and advised by his wife Lady Bird. Johnson enters the White House but soon must work on the passage of the Civil Rights Act. Martin Luther King Jr. pressures Johnson to pass the bill without amendments that would weaken it; Southern Democrats such as Richard Russell Jr. of Georgia oppose the bill so much that they may abandon the Democratic Party if the bill passes, and Republicans and Democrats on the fence offer amendments opposed by the liberals and the Civil Rights activists. At the same time, Johnson wants to declare the War on Poverty. The Gulf of Tonkin incident causes Johnson to ask Congress for a resolution endorsing a reprisal against North Vietnam, wary of being outflanked on the issue by the Republicans.

After successful passage of the Civil Rights Act over a filibuster, Johnson contends for election against Barry Goldwater in the 1964 presidential election. This is complicated by the Freedom Summer movement and pulls between the northern liberal wing and Southern Dixiecrat wing of the Democratic Party. Johnson assigns J. Edgar Hoover to investigate the murders of Chaney, Goodman, and Schwerner in Mississippi. The state of Mississippi also sends two delegations to the Democratic National Convention in Atlantic City: the "normal" delegation from the Dixiecrat wing, which threatened to walk out on Johnson, and the Mississippi Freedom Democratic Party (MFDP), a renegade wing supported by the Civil Rights Movement, but vehemently opposed by other Southerners. Johnson, in a bid to save the South, offers the MFDP a compromise that satisfies neither side; the Mississippi delegation walks out, and the MFDP is unhappy with the two at-large delegates offered to them.

Johnson hits Goldwater hard in the election, portraying him as a dangerous fanatic who will destroy the world, but is worried. Johnson's aide and friend Walter Jenkins is arrested for "disorderly conduct" after he is found having sex with another man in a public restroom; Johnson has an uncomfortable conversation with Hoover on how this fact slipped by security screening. Martin Luther King wins the Nobel Peace Prize; Hoover, still distrusting King, sends him an insulting, anonymous letter demanding King commit suicide, which is ignored. Johnson wins the election conclusively, but the Democratic Party loses the states of the Deep South. After a phone call with Russell, Johnson ends with a monologue expressing intense paranoia towards those around him.

== Cast ==
- Bryan Cranston as President Lyndon B. Johnson
- Anthony Mackie as Martin Luther King Jr.
- Melissa Leo as First Lady Lady Bird Johnson
- Frank Langella as Senator Richard B. Russell Jr.
- Bradley Whitford as Senator Hubert H. Humphrey Jr.
- Stephen Root as FBI Director J. Edgar Hoover
- Marque Richardson as Bob Moses
- Aisha Hinds as Fannie Lou Hamer
- Todd Weeks as Walter Jenkins
- Regi Davis as Aaron Henry
- Mo McRae as Stokely Carmichael
- Spencer Garrett as Walter Reuther
- Ken Jenkins as Representative Howard W. "Judge" Smith
- Jeff Doucette as Senator James Eastland
- Randy Oglesby as Senator J. Strom Thurmond
- Samantha Bogach as Luci Johnson
- Tim True as Deke Deloach
- Bruce Nozick as Stanley Levison
- Ned Van Zandt as Senator J. William Fulbright
- Joe O'Connor as Senator Robert Byrd
- Hal Landon Jr. as Speaker John McCormack
- Dan Desmond as Representative Bill McCulloch
- Stoney Westmoreland as Representative James C. Corman
- Ray Wise as Senator Everett M. Dirksen
- Eric Pumphrey as Dave Dennis
- Dohn Norwood as Ralph Abernathy
- Joe Morton as Roy Wilkins
- Toby Huss as Governor Paul B. Johnson Jr.
- Matthew Glave as Governor Carl Sanders
- Bo Foxworth as Secretary of Defense Robert McNamara

== Production ==
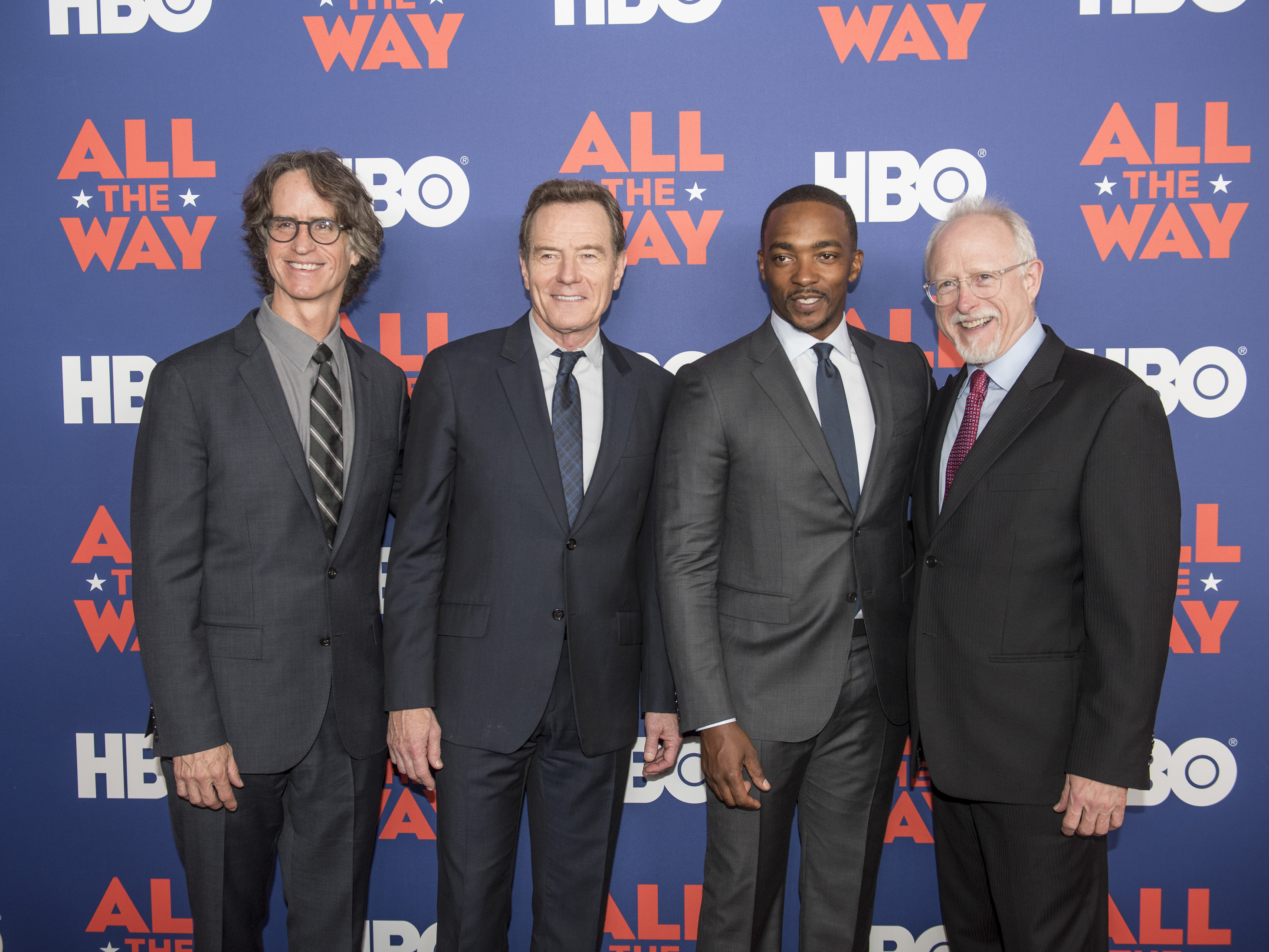
(L–R) Jay Roach, Bryan Cranston, Anthony Mackie and Robert Schenkkan at the All the Way premiere in Austin

On July 16, 2014, it was announced that HBO Films had acquired the rights to the play All the Way with Robert Schenkkan writing the adaptation and Bryan Cranston reprising his role as Lyndon B. Johnson. Schenkkan and producer Steven Spielberg agreed that the adaptation would differ significantly from the play. Schenkkan says, "When Steven, Bryan Cranston and I brought this to HBO, what I said at the time was, 'Look, I have no interest in just shooting the play. What I want to do is a complete cinematic reimagining of this story.' Everybody was on board for that. It's obviously recognizably the same story with many – but not all – of the same characters. I took a really hard look at how I could best tell this story on screen now that I had all the things that cinema brings that I did not have in my toolkit when I was working on stage."

On March 7, 2015, it was announced that Jay Roach would direct the film. On June 30, 2015, Anthony Mackie was cast as Martin Luther King Jr. On July 2, 2015, Melissa Leo was cast as Lady Bird Johnson. On July 8, 2015, Stephen Root and Marque Richardson were cast as J. Edgar Hoover and Bob Moses, respectively. On July 23, 2015, Bradley Whitford was cast as Hubert Humphrey. On July 23, 2015, Aisha Hinds, Spencer Garrett, Todd Weeks, and Mo McRae were cast as Fannie Lou Hamer, Walter Reuther, Walter Jenkins, and Stokely Carmichael, respectively. On July 28, 2015, Frank Langella was cast as Richard Russell Jr. On September 18, 2015, Bruce Nozick was cast as Stanley Levison. On September 29, 2015, Ned Van Zandt was cast as J. William Fulbright.

Principal photography began on August 13, 2015, and took place in Los Angeles.

== Reception ==
=== Critical response ===
The review aggregator website Rotten Tomatoes gave the film an approval rating of 85%, based on 47 reviews, with an average rating of 7.9/10. The site's critical consensus reads, "Anchored by Bryan Cranston's phenomenal performance as LBJ, All the Way is an engrossing portrayal of a complicated man during a pivotal moment in US history." On Metacritic the film has a score of 78 out of 100, based on 27 critics, indicating "generally favorable" reviews.

=== Viewership ===
All the Way drew approximately 1.11 million total viewers and a 0.2 rating among adults 18–49, making it the second most watched (at the time it aired) HBO original movie behind 2015's Bessie.

=== Accolades ===
Year	Award	Category	Nominee(s)	Result	Ref.
2016	Critics' Choice Awards	Best Movie/Miniseries		Nominated	
2016	Critics' Choice Awards	Best Actor in a Movie/Miniseries	Bryan Cranston	Nominated	
2016	Critics' Choice Awards	Best Supporting Actor in a Movie/ Miniseries	Frank Langella	Nominated	
2016	Critics' Choice Awards	Best Supporting Actress in a Movie/Miniseries	Melissa Leo	Nominated	
2016	Hollywood Music in Media Awards	Best Original Score – TV Show/Miniseries	James Newton Howard	Nominated	
2016	Online Film & Television Association Awards	Best Motion Picture		Nominated	
2016	Online Film & Television Association Awards	Best Actor in a Motion Picture or Limited Series	Bryan Cranston	Nominated	
2016	Online Film & Television Association Awards	Best Supporting Actress in a Motion Picture or Limited Series	Melissa Leo	Nominated	
2016	Online Film & Television Association Awards	Best Direction of a Motion Picture or Limited Series		Nominated	
2016	Online Film & Television Association Awards	Best Cinematography in a Non-Series		Nominated	
2016	Online Film & Television Association Awards	Best Costume Design in a Non-Series		Nominated	
2016	Online Film & Television Association Awards	Best Makeup/Hairstyling in a Non-Series		Nominated	
2016	Online Film & Television Association Awards	Best Music in a Non-Series		Nominated	
2016	Online Film & Television Association Awards	Best Production Design in a Non-Series		Nominated	
2016	Primetime Emmy Awards	Outstanding Television Movie	Steven Spielberg, Robert Schenkkan, Bryan Cranston, Jay Roach, Justin Falvey, Darryl Frank, James Degus, Michelle Graham, and Scott Ferguson	Nominated	
2016	Primetime Emmy Awards	Outstanding Lead Actor in a Limited Series or Movie	Bryan Cranston	Nominated	
2016	Primetime Emmy Awards	Outstanding Supporting Actress in a Limited Series or Movie	Melissa Leo	Nominated	
2016	Primetime Emmy Awards	Outstanding Directing for a Limited Series or Movie	Jay Roach	Nominated	
2016	Primetime Creative Arts Emmy Awards	Outstanding Hairstyling for a Limited Series or Movie	Anne Morgan, Terrie Velazquez-Owen, Brian Andrew-Tunstall, Julia Holdren, Barry Rosenberg, and Quan Pierce	Nominated	
2016	Primetime Creative Arts Emmy Awards	Outstanding Makeup (Non-Prosthetic)	Bill Corso, Francisco X. Perez, and Sabrina Wilson	Nominated	
2016	Primetime Creative Arts Emmy Awards	Outstanding Prosthetic Makeup	Bill Corso, Francisco X. Perez, Sabrina Wilson, and Andrew Clement	Nominated	
2016	Primetime Creative Arts Emmy Awards	Outstanding Music Composition for a Limited Series, Movie or Special (Original Dramatic Score)	James Newton Howard	Nominated	
2016	Television Critics Association Awards	Outstanding Achievement in Movies, Miniseries and Specials		Nominated	
2016	Television Critics Association Awards	Individual Achievement in Drama	Bryan Cranston	Nominated	
2017	American Cinema Editors Awards	Best Edited Miniseries or Motion Picture for Television	Carol Littleton	Won	
2017	American Society of Cinematographers Awards	Outstanding Achievement in Cinematography in Television Movie, Miniseries, or Pilot for Television	Jim Denault	Nominated	
2017	Directors Guild of America Awards	Outstanding Directorial Achievement in Movies for Television and Miniseries	Jay Roach	Nominated	
2017	Golden Globe Awards	Best Actor – Miniseries or Television Film	Bryan Cranston	Nominated	
2017	Make-Up Artists and Hair Stylists Guild Awards	Best Special Makeup Effects – Television Mini-Series or Motion Picture Made for Television	Bill Corso and Andrew Clement	Nominated	
2017	Satellite Awards	Best Miniseries or Motion Picture Made for Television		Nominated	
2017	Satellite Awards	Best Actor in a Miniseries or a Motion Picture Made for Television	Bryan Cranston	Won	
2017	Satellite Awards	Best Actress in a Miniseries or a Motion Picture Made for Television	Melissa Leo	Nominated	
2017	Screen Actors Guild Awards	Outstanding Performance by a Male Actor in a Television Movie or Miniseries	Bryan Cranston	Won	

== See also ==
- 1956 Sugar Bowl
- Civil rights movement
- Civil rights movement in popular culture
