= Howard Beale (Network) =

- Peter Finch as Howard Beale
- First appearance: Network (1976)
- Created by: Paddy Chayefsky
- Portrayed by: Peter Finch (film); Bryan Cranston (stage play)

In-universe information
- Gender: Male
- Occupation: News anchorman
- Spouse: Mrs Beale (1937-70; her death)
- Nationality: American

Howard Beale is a fictional character from the film Network (1976) and one of the central characters therein. He is played by Peter Finch, who won the posthumous Academy Award for Best Actor for the role.

== Plot summary ==
In Network, Beale, the anchorman for the UBS Evening News, struggles to accept the ramifications of the social ailments and depravity existing in the world. His producers exploit him for high ratings and avoid giving him the psychiatric assistance that some, especially news division president and his best friend, Max Schumacher (William Holden), think he needs.

Beale, a long-standing and respected anchorman who began his career at UBS in 1950, saw his ratings begin a slow but steady decline in 1969. In 1970, his wife died and he became lonely, causing him to drink heavily. In September 1975, the UBS network decided to fire him, leading him to engage in binge drinking as he feels there is nothing left for him in the world. Beale's career as "The Mad Prophet of the Airwaves" is sparked by his half-joking offer, after receiving his two weeks' notice, to kill himself on nationwide TV. He subsequently apologizes to his viewers, telling them he "ran out of bullshit." Viewers respond positively and the network producer Diana Christensen (Faye Dunaway) wants him to serve as an "angry man" news anchorman. Schumacher feels that Christensen is exploiting his troubled friend, but Beale happily embraces the role of the "angry man". His foul-mouthed tirades feature a dark vision of America as a nation in decline as he speaks about the "depression" (i.e the recession caused by the Arab oil shock of 1973–74), OPEC, rising crime, the collapse of traditional values and other contemporary issues. Beale believes his ranting is guided by a voice in his head, talking of having some mystical connection to some sort of higher supernatural power, but Schumacher believes he is losing his mind. However, encouraged by Christensen, the executives at UBS decide that his unhinged ranting about the state of the world, especially when he repeatedly shouts "I'm as mad as hell and I'm not going to take this anymore!", will revive ratings at the struggling network. He is given his own show where he can say whatever he likes, and the carnivalesque show becomes the number one show in the United States. Beale shouts about whatever issue of the moment is agitating him until he passes out. At one point, he rants about how television is an "illusion" that peddles fantasies that can never be realized.

Unfortunately for the network, he exposes the ties between CCA, the corporation that owns the network, and business interests in Saudi Arabia. At a time when Saudi Arabia was unpopular in the United States owing to the Arab oil boycott of 1973–74, Beale charges that the House of Saud is buying up the United States and demands his audience send telegrams to the White House to save the United States from being bought up by the Saudis. Arthur Jensen, CCA chairman and chief stockholder (played by Ned Beatty), thunderously explains to Beale his belief that money is the only true god, whereupon Beale completely turns his message around: where he previously told people their lives had value and meaning, he says the opposite after his meeting with Jensen. Beale tells his viewers that Americans are degenerating into "humanoids" devoid of intellect and feelings, saying that as the wealthiest nation, the United States is the nation most advanced in undergoing this process of degeneration which he predicts will ultimately be the fate of all humanity. His ratings drop, but Jensen orders him kept on; network executives order him to be assassinated. The film concludes with his murder on national television; a voiceover proclaims him "the first known instance of a man who was killed because he had lousy ratings".

== Adaptations ==
In the 2017 stage adaptation, the role of Beale is played by Bryan Cranston in the National Theatre, London production. Later, the play moved to Broadway in New York. The show was critically well received. Cranston's performance in particular received universal acclaim and won him several awards, including the Tony Award for Best Actor in a Play.

== Reception ==
The image of Beale in a khaki raincoat with his wet hair plastered to his head, standing up during the middle of his newscast saying, "I'm as mad as hell, and I'm not going to take this anymore!" is often listed as one of the most iconic in film history, and the aforementioned line ranked #19 on the American Film Institute's 2005 list of the 100 greatest American movie quotes.

His character has been described as "consistent with a standard definition of a biblical prophet".
