= Trumbo (2015 film) =

2015 film directed by Jay Roach

- Theatrical release poster
- Directed by: Jay Roach
- Written by: John McNamara
- Based on: Dalton Trumbo by Bruce Cook
- Produced by: Michael London; Janice Williams; Shivani Rawat; Monica Levinson; Nimitt Mankad; John McNamara; Kevin Kelly Brown
- Starring: Bryan Cranston; Diane Lane; Helen Mirren; Louis C.K.; Elle Fanning; John Goodman; Michael Stuhlbarg
- Cinematography: Jim Denault
- Edited by: Alan Baumgarten
- Music by: Theodore Shapiro
- Production companies: ShivHans Pictures; Groundswell Productions; Everyman Pictures
- Distributed by: Bleecker Street (United States); Entertainment One Features (International)
- Release dates: September 12, 2015 (TIFF); November 6, 2015 (United States)
- Running time: 124 minutes
- Country: United States
- Language: English
- Budget: $10 million
- Box office: $13.3 million

Trumbo is a 2015 American biographical drama film directed by Jay Roach and written by John McNamara. The film stars Bryan Cranston, Diane Lane, Helen Mirren, Louis C.K., Elle Fanning, John Goodman, Michael Stuhlbarg as Edward G. Robinson, Dean O'Gorman as Kirk Douglas, and David James Elliott as John Wayne. The film follows the life of Hollywood screenwriter Dalton Trumbo, and is based on the 1977 biography Dalton Trumbo by Bruce Alexander Cook.

The film was shown in the Special Presentations section of the 2015 Toronto International Film Festival on September 12, 2015, and was released on November 6, 2015, by Bleecker Street. The film received generally positive reviews, with Bryan Cranston earning wide recognition for his performance, including the Best Actor nominations for an Academy Award, a BAFTA Award, a Screen Actors Guild Award, a Golden Globe Award, and a Critics' Choice Movie Award.

== Plot ==
Dalton Trumbo is a screenwriter whose talent places him among the elite of Hollywood. His membership in the Communist Party of the USA draws the contempt of staunchly anti-Soviet entertainment-industry figures such as columnist Hedda Hopper and actor John Wayne. Trumbo is one of 10 screenwriters subpoenaed to testify before the House Un-American Activities Committee (HUAC) regarding Communist propaganda in Hollywood films. They refuse directly to answer questions, confident that a liberal majority on the Supreme Court will overturn their convictions for contempt of Congress. Trumbo's friend Edward G. Robinson, who supports the cause, sells Vincent van Gogh's 1887 painting Portrait of Père Tanguy to raise money for their legal defense fund. The unexpected deaths of Justices Wiley Rutledge and Frank Murphy ruin Trumbo's plan to appeal. In 1950, Trumbo serves 11 months in Federal Correctional Institution in Ashland, Kentucky.

As the Hollywood Blacklist expands to exclude more communists and communist sympathizers from working in the industry, Trumbo and his comrades are abandoned by Robinson and producer Buddy Ross, who disavow them to protect their careers. Trumbo is released from prison but he remains blacklisted and his finances – and family life – become increasingly strained. He resorts to giving the screenplay for Roman Holiday to his friend Ian McLellan Hunter, to take credit and a share of the money and eventually the Academy Award for Best Story. Selling his idyllic lakeside home and moving to a house in the city, he goes to work as a pseudonymous screenwriter for the low-budget King Brothers Productions, also farming out the writing of B-movie screenplays to fellow blacklisted writers. He puts his wife Cleo and teenage children to work as his support staff, adding to domestic conflict. King Brothers' film The Brave One, an original story by Trumbo under a pseudonym, receives an Academy Award he cannot claim. His blacklisted friend Arlen Hird dies from cancer, destitute but an attempt by Hedda Hopper's allies to intimidate the head of King Brothers into firing Trumbo fails completely.

Industry suspicion of Trumbo's ghostwriting develops but he is careful not to confirm it. In 1960, actor Kirk Douglas recruits him to write the screenplay for his epic film Spartacus and director Otto Preminger recruits him to script Exodus. Both men publicly credit him as the screenwriter, despite Hopper's futile efforts to intimidate Douglas into dropping Trumbo. By early 1961, the effectiveness of the Blacklist had been broken to the point where new US President John F. Kennedy publicly endorsed Spartacus and Trumbo and others are able to begin rebuilding their careers. Ten years later, finally receiving his due from Hollywood, Trumbo speaks about how the Blacklist victimized them all: those who stood by their principles and lost their jobs and also those who compromised their principles to keep them.

== Cast ==
- Bryan Cranston as Dalton Trumbo
- Diane Lane as Cleo Fincher Trumbo
- Helen Mirren as Hedda Hopper
- Louis C.K. as Arlen Hird (Note: "Arlen Hird" is a composite character based on Alvah Bessie, Lester Cole, John Howard Lawson, Albert Maltz, and Samuel Ornitz.)
- Elle Fanning as Nikola Trumbo
  - Madison Wolfe plays a younger Nikola
- Mattie Liptak as Chris Trumbo (13 to 17)
- John Goodman as Frank King
- Michael Stuhlbarg as Edward G. Robinson
- Alan Tudyk as Ian McLellan Hunter
- Adewale Akinnuoye-Agbaje as Virgil Brooks
- Dean O'Gorman as Kirk Douglas
- Stephen Root as Hymie King
- Rio Hackford as Reporter
- Roger Bart as Buddy Ross (Note: "Buddy Ross" is a composite character based on Dore Schary and Walter Wanger.)
- David James Elliott as John Wayne
- Peter Mackenzie as Robert Kenny
- John Getz as Sam Wood
- Christian Berkel as Otto Preminger
- Billy Slaughter as D.C. Reporter
- Richard Portnow as Louis B. Mayer
- Sean Bridgers as Jeff Krandall
- James Dumont as J. Parnell Thomas
- Dan Bakkedahl as Roy Brewer

== Production ==
On September 18, 2013, Bryan Cranston joined the cast to play Dalton Trumbo. On April 14, 2014, Helen Mirren joined the cast to play Hedda Hopper. On August 7, 2014, Diane Lane, Elle Fanning, John Goodman, and Michael Stuhlbarg joined the cast. On August 13, 2014, David James Elliott, Peter Mackenzie, and Roger Bart joined the cast to play John Wayne, Robert Kenny, and Buddy Ross, respectively. On September 6, 2014, Louis C.K. joined the cast to play Arlen Hird. On September 22, 2014, Dean O'Gorman joined the cast to play Kirk Douglas. On October 16, 2014, Adewale Akinnuoye-Agbaje joined the cast to play Virgil Brooks. Principal photography began on September 15, 2014, and ended on November 6, 2014.

== Release ==
On August 13, 2014, it was announced that Bleecker Street would distribute the film. The film had its world premiere at the 2015 Toronto International Film Festival on September 12, 2015. The film had a limited release on November 6, 2015 before going wide on November 27.

Trumbo grossed $7.9 million in the United States and Canada and $5.4 million in other countries, for a worldwide total of $13.3 million.

== Reception ==
On review aggregator website Rotten Tomatoes, the film has an approval rating of 74% based on 205 reviews, with an average rating of 6.70/10. The site's critical consensus states, "Trumbo serves as an honorable and well-acted tribute to a brilliant writer's principled stand, even if it doesn't quite achieve the greatness of its subject's own classic screenplays." Metacritic gives the film a weighted average score of 60 out of 100, based on 33 critics, indicating "mixed or average reviews".

Peter Debruge of Variety gave the film a positive review, saying, "Trumbo may be clumsy and overly simplistic at times, but it's still an important reminder of how democracy can fail (that is, when a fervent majority turns on those with different and potentially threatening values), and the strength of character it takes to fight the system." Manohla Dargis of The New York Times gave the film a negative review, saying "Part biopic, part historical gloss, Trumbo tells a great-man story with a patchwork of fact and fiction, mixing in the odd bit of newsreel with a great many dull, visually flat and poorly lighted dramatic scenes." Mick LaSalle of the San Francisco Chronicle gave the film three out of four stars, saying "Trumbo is breezy and pithy without ever undercutting the seriousness of the subject. A certain degree of wit is appropriate in a writer's story, just as any Hollywood tale must at least have a whiff of absurdity, or else it can't be true." Richard Roeper of the Chicago Sun-Times gave the film three out of four stars, saying "Trumbo is a corny, well-made B-movie about an A-list screenwriter who had to take jobs writing B-movies after he was blacklisted, but eventually worked his way back to writing A-movies with Kirk Douglas a.k.a. Spartacus as his champion."

Jordan Mintzer of The Hollywood Reporter gave the film a positive review, saying "What makes the movie work are the lively performances, both from the supporting cast and from Cranston, who sheds the mimicry and pontificating of earlier scenes to turn Trumbo into a wry, self-deprecating and somewhat cheeky older man, even if he continued to stand up for what was right." Ty Burr of The Boston Globe gave the film three out of four stars, saying "Cranston's performance is the motor that runs Trumbo, and that motor never idles, never flags in momentum or magnetism or idealistic scorn." Alonso Duralde of TheWrap gave the film a positive review, saying "Roach and McNamara fall victim to the occasional phony biopic moment or straight-up moment of didacticism, but overall Trumbo is a lively history about the day-in-day-out drudgery of survival during oppressive times. Screenwriters are so rarely taken seriously by the film industry that it's a nice switch to watch them be the heroes." Bill Goodykoontz of The Arizona Republic gave the film three and a half stars out of four, saying "Roach's film may be light in places, even sugarcoated in others, but any reminder of the past and its impact on the future is a welcome one. Plus, we get a good Cranston performance in the bargain."

Despite generally positive reviews, several reviewers criticized the film for being historically misleading or ideologically manipulative. Godfrey Cheshire of the Roger Ebert Journal wrote that Trumbo is "another of those simplistic, made-to-order films about the Hollywood blacklist in which the blacklisted movie folks are all innocent, in every conceivable way." Cheshire decried the film's insinuation that the House Committee on Un-American Activities created the Hollywood blacklist and that "Sen. Joseph McCarthy had something to do with Congress' pursuit of Hollywood." Cheshire also criticized the film for mainstreaming communism: "it invites us to see the Communist Party USA as just another political party rather than as the domestic instrument of a hostile and ultra-murderous foreign tyranny."

Other critics raised similar historical concerns. While the film portrays Trumbo as "a New Deal liberal hero defending civil liberties", Ron Capshaw in The American Spectator stated the real Trumbo was an outspoken supporter of Soviet-style communism, including Joseph Stalin and North Korean dictator Kim Il Sung. The conservative Pat Buchanan questioned the appropriateness of portraying Trumbo as a "martyr to the first amendment" while overlooking his support for regimes that actively suppress free speech. Armond White of National Review went a step further, accusing director Jay Roach of "unrestrained partisanship" for whitewashing the history of communism to invent a hero that supports Roach's political views.

=== Accolades ===
Bryan Cranston earned wide recognition for his portrayal of Dalton Trumbo, and was nominated as Best Actor for an Academy Award, a BAFTA Award, a Screen Actors Guild Award, a Golden Globe Award, and a Critics' Choice Movie Award.

Awards
Award	Date of ceremony	Category	Recipient	Outcome
Academy Awards	February 28, 2016	Best Actor	Bryan Cranston	Nominated
British Academy Film Awards	February 14, 2016	Best Actor in a Leading Role	Bryan Cranston	Nominated
Costume Designers Guild Awards	February 23, 2016	Excellence in Period Film	Daniel Orlandi	Nominated
Critics' Choice Awards	January 17, 2016	Best Actor	Bryan Cranston	Nominated
Critics' Choice Awards	January 17, 2016	Best Supporting Actress	Helen Mirren	Nominated
Critics' Choice Awards	January 17, 2016	Best Acting Ensemble	Adewale Akinnuoye-Agbaje, Louis C.K., Bryan Cranston, David James Elliott, Elle Fanning, John Goodman, Diane Lane, Helen Mirren, Michael Stuhlbarg, Alan Tudyk	Nominated
Golden Globe Awards	January 10, 2016	Best Actor – Motion Picture Drama	Bryan Cranston	Nominated
Golden Globe Awards	January 10, 2016	Best Supporting Actress – Motion Picture	Helen Mirren	Nominated
Houston Film Critics Society	January 9, 2016	Best Actor	Bryan Cranston	Nominated
Palm Springs International Film Festival	January 2, 2016	Spotlight Award – Actor	Bryan Cranston	Won
San Diego Film Critics Society	December 14, 2015	Best Actor	Bryan Cranston	Nominated
San Diego Film Critics Society	December 14, 2015	Best Supporting Actress	Helen Mirren	Nominated
San Francisco Film Critics Circle	December 12, 2015	Best Actor	Bryan Cranston	Nominated
San Francisco Film Critics Circle	December 12, 2015	Best Supporting Actress	Helen Mirren	Nominated
Saturn Awards	June 22, 2016	Best Independent Film		Nominated
Screen Actors Guild Awards	January 30, 2016	Outstanding Performance by a Male Actor in a Leading Role	Bryan Cranston	Nominated
Screen Actors Guild Awards	January 30, 2016	Outstanding Performance by a Female Actor in a Supporting Role	Helen Mirren	Nominated
Screen Actors Guild Awards	January 30, 2016	Outstanding Performance by a Cast in a Motion Picture	Adewale Akinnuoye-Agbaje, Louis C.K., Bryan Cranston, David James Elliott, Elle Fanning, John Goodman, Diane Lane, Helen Mirren, Michael Stuhlbarg, Alan Tudyk	Nominated
Writers Guild of America Awards	February 13, 2016	Best Adapted Screenplay	John McNamara	Nominated
Writers Guild of America Awards	February 13, 2016	Paul Selvin Award	John McNamara	Won

=== Alleged Robinson inaccuracy ===
The film depicts actor Edward G. Robinson betraying his friend Dalton Trumbo and others by naming them as communists before the House Un-American Activities Committee. Robinson testified four times before the committee and eventually stated that he had been a dupe of communist front organizations. According to the transcript of a hearing on April 30, 1952, Robinson gave the following testimony: "Well, you had Albert Maltz, and you have Dalton Trumbo, and you have—what is the other fellow, the top fellow who they say is the commissar out there?", and after being prompted by his questioner (Mr. Walter), Robinson continued: "Yes, John Howard Lawson. I knew Frank Tuttle. I didn't know Dmytryk at all. There are the Buchmans, that I know, Sidney Buchman and all that sort of thing. It never entered my mind that any of these people were Communists." His testimony is re-enacted in the film, but with alterations, including to some of the names and their order. For instance, instead of John Howard Lawson, the composite character, Arlen Hird, is identified as "the commissar".
